= Flight 328 =

Flight 328 may refer to:

- British Airtours Flight 328, caught fire on takeoff on 22 August 1985
- Aer Lingus Flight 328, struck power lines and crashed on 31 January 1986
- United Airlines Flight 328, suffered a contained engine failure on 20 February 2021
