= United Airlines Flight 1175 =

2018 aircraft incident over the Pacific Ocean

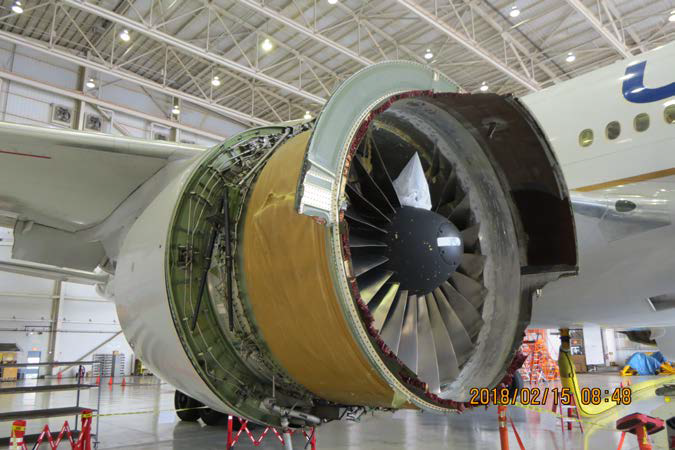
- The damage to the right engine after the engine failure

Incident
- Date: February 13, 2018
- Summary: Emergency landing following engine failure in cruise
- Site: Pacific Ocean

Aircraft
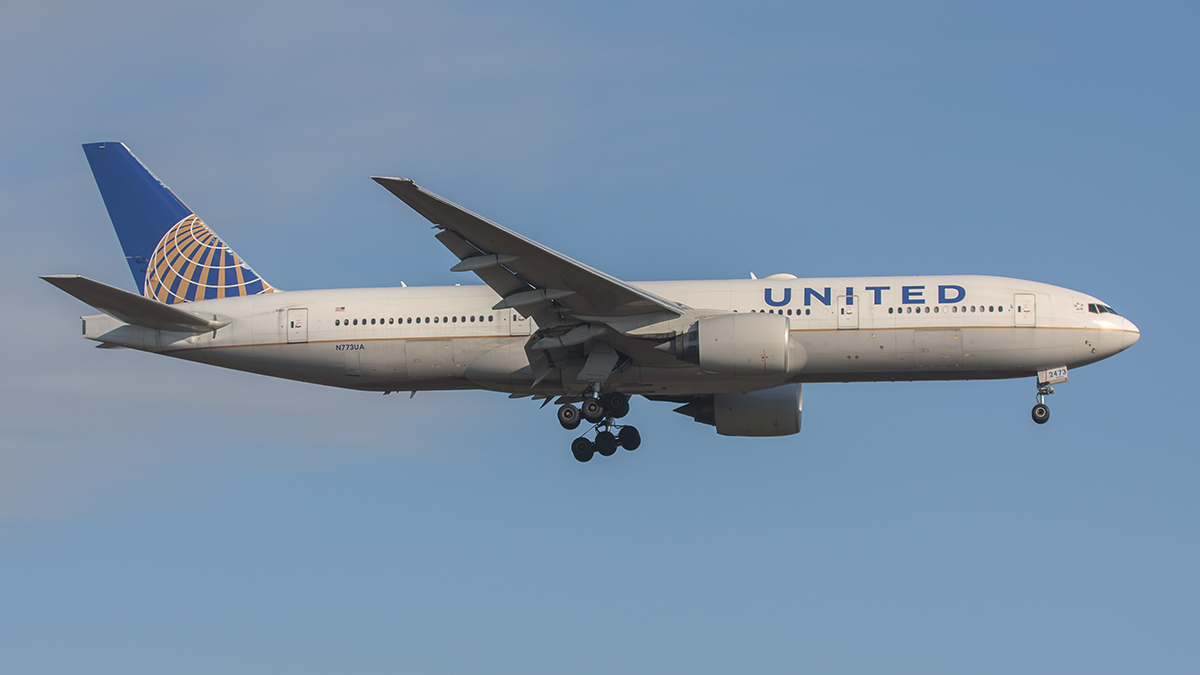
- N773UA, the aircraft involved in the incident, seen in 2015
- Aircraft type: Boeing 777-222 (Note: The aircraft was a Boeing 777-200 model; Boeing assigns a unique code for each company that buys one of its aircraft, which is applied as a suffix to the model number at the time the aircraft is built, hence "777-222" designates a 777-200 built for United Airlines (customer code 22).)
- Operator: United Airlines
- IATA flight No.: UA1175
- ICAO flight No.: UAL1175
- Call sign: UNITED 1175
- Registration: N773UA
- Flight origin: San Francisco International Airport, San Francisco, California, United States
- Destination: Daniel K. Inouye International Airport, Honolulu, Hawaii, United States
- Occupants: 378
- Passengers: 363
- Crew: 15
- Fatalities: 0
- Survivors: 378

On February 13, 2018, around noon local time, a Boeing 777 operating as United Airlines Flight 1175 (UA1175), experienced an in-flight separation of a fan blade in the No. 2 (right) engine while over the Pacific Ocean en route from San Francisco International Airport to the Daniel K. Inouye International Airport, Honolulu, Hawaii. During level cruise flight shortly before beginning a descent from flight level 360 (roughly 36,000 feet or 11,000 meters), and about 120 miles (100 nmi; 190 km) from the destination, the flight crew heard a loud bang, followed by a violent shaking of the airplane, followed by warnings of a compressor stall. The flight crew shut down the failed engine, declared an emergency, and began a drift-down descent, proceeding direct to the Daniel K. Inouye International Airport where they made a single-engine landing without further incident at 12:37 local time. There were no reported injuries to the 378 passengers and crew on board and the airplane damage was classified as minor under National Transportation Safety Board (NTSB) criteria.

NTSB investigators traveled to the scene to begin an incident investigation. They found a full-length fan blade fracture in the No. 2 (right) engine, a Pratt & Whitney (P&W) PW4077 turbofan. Its installed set of hollow-core fan blades had undergone two previous overhauls at P&W that included a thermal acoustic imaging (TAI) internal inspection that is intended to prevent this type of failure. The right engine nacelle lost most of the inlet duct and all of the left and right fan cowls immediately after the engine failure. Two small punctures were found in the right side fuselage just below the window belt with material transfer consistent with impact from pieces of an engine fan blade. The damage was eventually repaired and the aircraft returned to service. Improved procedures for TAI inspection were implemented by P&W, increased frequency of TAI inspection was required by regulators, and a redesign of the inlet duct was also initiated by Boeing, all as a result of this incident and investigation.

== Aircraft ==
The aircraft involved, manufactured by Boeing in 1995, was a Boeing 777-222, the United Airlines specific variant of the original 777-200 series, registered as N773UA, (c/n 26929) and line number 4. It was powered by two Pratt & Whitney PW4000 engines. Boeing stopped building the 777 with P&W PW4000 series engines in 2013, and the engine is no longer in active production. Later in 2021, N773UA was used to fly the passengers of Flight 328 from Denver to Honolulu after the aforementioned flight, operated by sister ship N772UA, suffered a similar problem.

The Boeing 777 is a long-range, wide-body, twin-engine aircraft. At the time of the incident it had a relatively low accident fatality rate. The only two 777 accidents with total loss of aircraft, passengers and crew are Malaysia Airlines flight MH17 that was shot down over Ukraine in July 2014 and flight MH370 that disappeared over the Indian Ocean in March 2014. The other fatal accidents, Emirates Flight 521 and Asiana Airlines Flight 214, were both attributed to pilot error. Two other hull losses with passenger injuries occurred: EgyptAir Flight 667 had a cockpit fire while parked at the gate at Cairo Airport, and British Airways Flight 38 crashed on landing at Heathrow Airport. The latter was attributed to a design defect in its Rolls-Royce Trent 895-17 engines, not the P&W engines on Flight 1175.

=== Engine ===
The original 777-200 was distinctive for its Pratt & Whitney PW4000 engines that are about as wide as a 737 fuselage. The PW4077 variant used on the United 777-222 nominally produces 77,000 pounds-force (340 kN) of thrust. It is a dual-spool, axial-flow, high bypass turbofan engine, that is a higher bypass version of the PW4000-94 engine originally fitted to the Boeing 747-400. It was re-designed exclusively for the 777 with a larger 112-inch (280 cm) diameter fan section using 22 hollow core fan blades. The PW4000-112 fan blade is a wide chord airfoil made of a titanium alloy, about 40.5 inches (103 cm) long and about 22.25 inches (56.5 cm) wide at the blade tip. A PW4000-112 fan blade can weigh a maximum of 34.85 pounds (15.81 kg).

== Incident ==
The flight departed SFO on time and the push back, taxi, takeoff, and climb were normal. There were three pilots on the flight deck: Captain Christopher Borzu Behnam (57), who was the pilot monitoring, First Officer (FO) Paul Ayers (60), who was the pilot flying, and a jump seat rider, who was off-duty United Airlines 777 First Officer Ed Gagarin. The captain reported a total of 13,592 hours total time, with 360 hours in the Boeing 777. The first officer reported a total of 11,318 hours total time, with 10,087 in the Boeing 777.

At the time of the fan blade out engine failure event, 11:58 Hawaiian standard time (HST), the flight was about 120 miles (100 nmi; 190 km) from HNL at flight level (FL) 360 (roughly 36,000 feet or 11,000 meters) when there was a violent jolt and very loud bang that both pilots stated was followed by extreme airframe vibrations. The pilots reported that immediately after the jolt and loud bang, the autopilot disconnected, and the airplane began to roll to the right. A positive exchange of controls was accomplished with the captain becoming pilot flying. The pilots stated that about 15 to 30 seconds after the jolt and loud bang, the Engine Indicating and Crew Alerting System (EICAS) showed that there was no engine pressure ratio (EPR), N1, or oil pressure. After completing the Severe Engine Damage checklist, the crew shut down and secured the right engine. The jump seat rider stated that after the right engine was shut down, the vibration subsided although the controllability of the airplane was not normal. The crew declared an emergency and began a drift down descent to FL 230 (roughly 23,000 feet or 7,000 meters).

The captain directed the jump seat rider to go back into the cabin to assess the condition of the engine. The jump seat rider noted that the engine was oscillating and that the cowling was missing. He took a video of the engine to show the captain and the FO the engine's condition. The pilots reported that concurrently, the purser had come to the flight deck and the captain briefed her about the emergency and that they would be landing at HNL. The crew decided the most suitable airport in time, distance, and familiarity was HNL. The airplane continued to HNL and made a visual approach and landed on Runway 8R without further incident. The pilots stated that the aircraft rescue and firefighting (ARFF) personnel inspected the airplane and when the airplane was determined to be safe, they taxied the airplane to the gate where the passengers deplaned normally. The 363 passengers, 3 pilots, and 12 flight attendants board deplaned normally at the gate and there were no injuries.

=== Cockpit voice recorder timeline ===
Selected events from the CVR (all times HST).

11:58:27 Sound of bang.
11:58:58 The flight crew told flight attendants to take their seats.
12:00:27 United 1175 declared mayday.
12:05:28 The captain noted a lot of vibration on the controls.
12:05:48 The captain asked the jumpseat occupant to go into the cabin and visually inspect the engine.
12:07:47 The jumpseat occupant returned and reported the entire outer case of the engine was gone. The captain wondered if debris had struck the stabilizer due to the vibration on the controls.
12:08:10 The captain asked the jumpseat occupant to go back again and take a couple pictures of the damage.
12:10:37 The first officer reported the situation to dispatch.
12:17:41 The crew discussed crossfeeding fuel and decide to wait until passing 10,000 feet.
12:21:05 The crew discussed a flaps 20° approach at about 145 knots
12:27:50 The captain briefed flight attendants on the situation.
12:29:51 The crew initiated fuel crossfeed.
12:30:36 The crew briefed arrival procedures into Honolulu.
12:34:00 The crew reported Honolulu Airport in sight.
12:34:20 The crew lowered landing gear.
12:36:12 The crew finished the landing checklist.
12:37:15 The aircraft touched down.
12:37:34 The crew told passengers to remain seated.
12:38:55 The crew asked ARFF to visually inspect the engine for leaks and risks of fire.
12:41:57 ARFF reported a minor hydraulic leak. The crew stated their intention to taxi to the gate.
13:02:34 The aircraft reached the gate and the crew performed the engine shutdown checklist.

== Investigation ==
The examination of the airplane revealed a small hole along with several dents and gouges in the fuselage adjacent to the No. 2 engine. There were two small dents and punctures in the right side of the fuselage, below the window belt in the vicinity of seat rows 20 and 21. Subsequent laboratory examination of the skin surrounding the puncture found embedded particles of largely titanium and vanadium, which along with aluminum are the alloying elements of the fan blade material. There were also several dents in the right wing and the right-hand horizontal stabilizer.

The majority of the right engine inlet assembly was missing. All the inlet lip skin, the forward bulkhead, most of the inner and outer barrels, and about half of the rear bulkhead were not recovered. The majority of both inner and outer halves on the fan cowl were also missing. The missing parts were lost at sea. The left and right side thrust reversers, and the exhaust cowl were in place and intact.

=== Engine ===
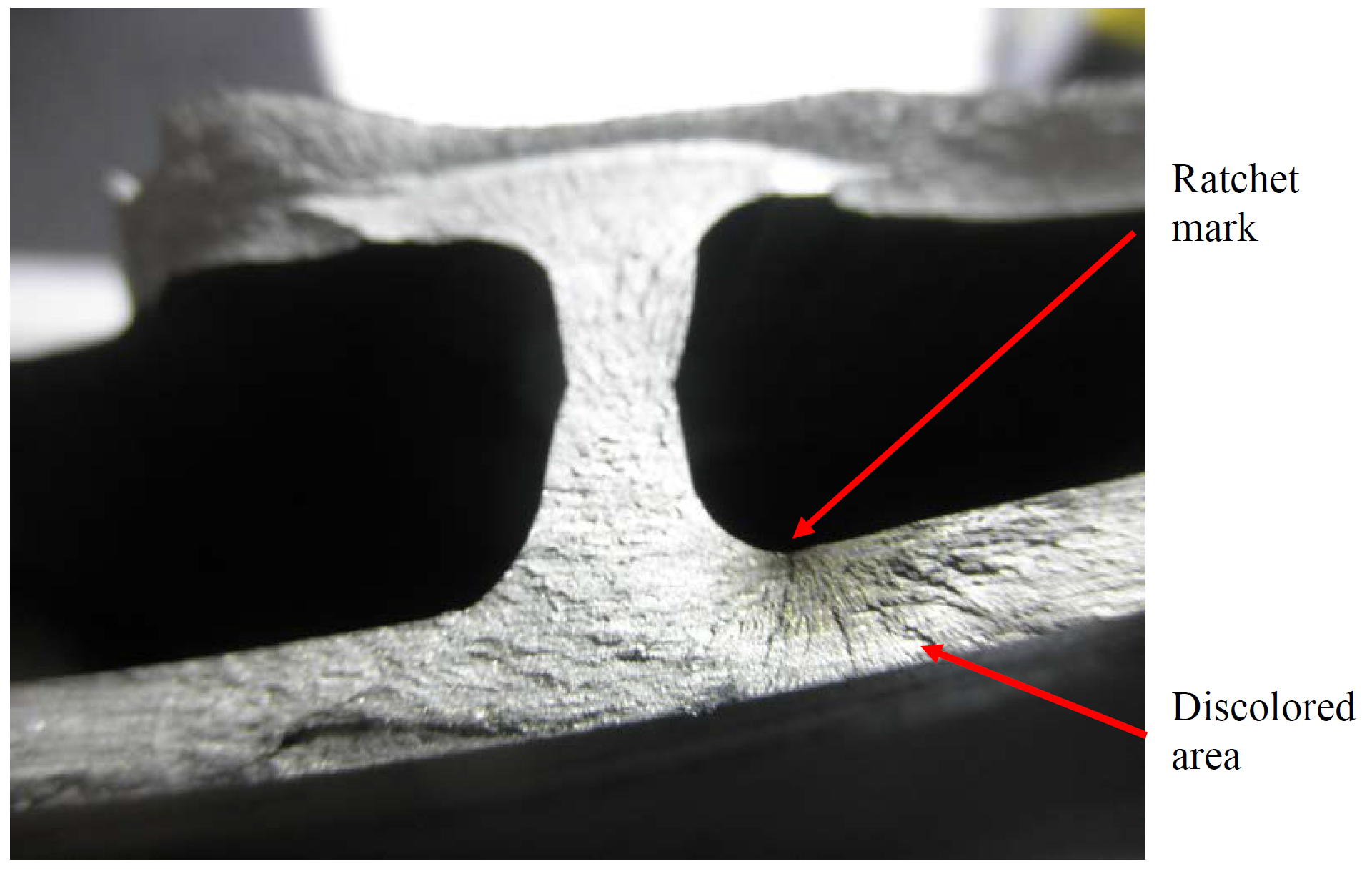
Fracture surface of UA1175 fan blade showing discolored area and ratchet mark radiating from an interior surface of the fan blade. [Ratchet marks are the step-like junctions between adjacent fatigue cracks that propagate and link up.] (NTSB Photo)

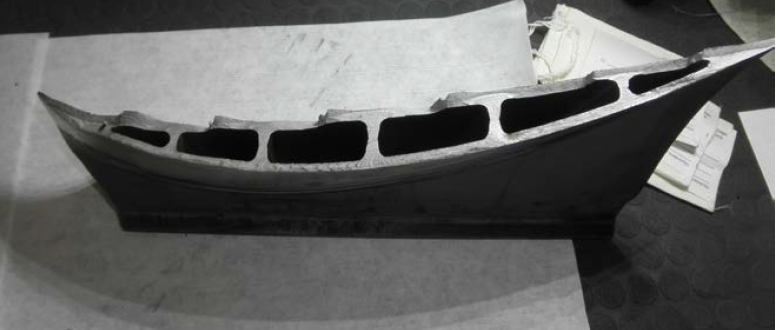
UA1175 No. 11 fan blade root section fracture surface (NTSB Photo)

There was extensive damage to the interior surface of the fan case in the form of gouging and cracking. Although there were cracks in the case and the outer layer of the Kevlar wrap was split, there was no penetration of debris. The maximum deformation of the Kevlar environmental wrap was about 2.5 inches (64 mm) at about 3 o'clock. The location of the maximum deformation of the wrap was coincident with the approximately 34-inch (86 cm) long crack on the inside of the fan case.

Interior surfaces of the fan case and the remains of the inlet duct showed scratches and gouges that were in a spiral pattern across the fan case and front flange onto the inlet duct to the broken edge of the duct on the inboard area of the nacelle. The examination of the fan case showed that there were three distinct patterns of tracks along the flow path that appeared to spiral forward from the plane of the fan blades' leading edge across the A-flange on to the inlet duct's inner barrel.

Fan blade No. 11 was fractured transversely across the airfoil directly above the fairings that are between the base of each blade. The blade's fracture surface was flat with elliptical-shaped marks across the internal ribs and along the convex surface of the airfoil. The other fan blade, which was identified as fan blade No. 10 and was the adjacent trailing blade, was fractured across the airfoil about 24 inches (61 cm) above the fairings. Laboratory examination of fan blade No. 11 revealed a low cycle fatigue (LCF) fracture that originated on the interior cavity wall directly below the surface.

The metallurgical examination of the fractured fan blade was accomplished at P&W's Materials Laboratory in the presence of members of the Powerplants Group as well as an NTSB metallurgist. The examination revealed a fatigue fracture that had initiated from a subsurface origin on the interior surface of the hollow core fan blade. The origin of the crack was in an area where the basal planes of the crystals were all similarly aligned and were almost perpendicular the localized stress field when the fan blade was formed. The examination also revealed that the fan blade's material conformed to the specified titanium alloy's requirements.

The installed set of fan blades, including the fractured fan blade, had undergone two overhauls at which time the blades underwent a thermal acoustic imaging (TAI) inspection. At the initial TAI in 2010, there was a small indication at the location of the origin of the crack. The review of the records from the 2015 TAI show that there was a larger indication in the same area as where there was an indication in 2010 and from where the crack originated. At the time of each TAI, the inspectors attributed the indication to a defect in the paint that was used during the TAI process, and they allowed the blade to continue the overhaul process and be returned to service. Because of this United Airlines fan blade separation incident and the finding that the fractured fan blade had a rejectable indication at the previous TAI, P&W initiated an over-inspection and reviewed the TAI inspection records for all 9,606 previously inspected PW4000 112-inch fan blades.

The training that was provided to the inspectors was primarily on-the-job training. The review of the TAI process revealed several issues with the inspectors' training as well as with the inspection facility that could adversely impact the inspection. P&W has advised that it was working to correct those issues. The Federal Aviation Administration (FAA) engine certification office issued a Notice of Proposed Rulemaking that would mandate the accomplishment of initial and repetitive TAI inspections on PW4000 112-inch fan blades.

=== Airframe ===
Image from failure scenario modeling by Boeing reconstructing UA1175 cowling loss based on remaining parts only, because departed parts were lost at sea. (NTSB photo)

The inlet is a cantilevered structure that directs the airflow into the engine fan case in a controlled and uniform manner. The inlet consists of two concentric cylinders (the inner and outer barrels) joined by forward and aft bulkheads and a lip skin. The inlet aft bulkhead was constructed of Carbon Fiber Reinforced Plastic (CFRP) on the production airplanes. During engine fan blade out (FBO) certification testing the inlet cowl construction consisted of an aluminum bulkhead. The inlet is bolted to the forward end of the fan case though an attach ring using 44 bolted connections. Loads and displacements resulting from a FBO are transferred between the inlet and the engine fan case though the attachment bolts and the attachment ring.

Because the aluminum versus the CFRP structure has the ability to yield while absorbing the same amount of energy, it can redistribute the FBO loads between the fan case and the inlet without causing failure to the inlet, or the fan case to inlet interface. The inlet and fan cowl structural analyses showed that the CFRP aft bulkhead design was less capable than the aluminum bulkhead that was tested during engine certification test and determined that multiple possible scenarios could have led to their separation:

1) the inlet aft bulkhead load path damage caused by the unanticipated magnitude of the displacements induced by the displacement wave following the FBO combined with the anticipated inner barrel fragment induced damage progressed under rundown loads, resulting in portions of the inlet departing within one second following the FBO,
2) the departure of portions of the inlet including the lower aft bulkhead caused the static and/or dynamic loads to increase beyond the fan cowls capability, that lead to the departure of large portions of the fan cowl,
3) the fan cowl honeycomb core strength was reduced below its capability to react rundown loads due to moisture ingression at the hinge points leading to large portions of the fan cowl departing prior to the inlets departure.

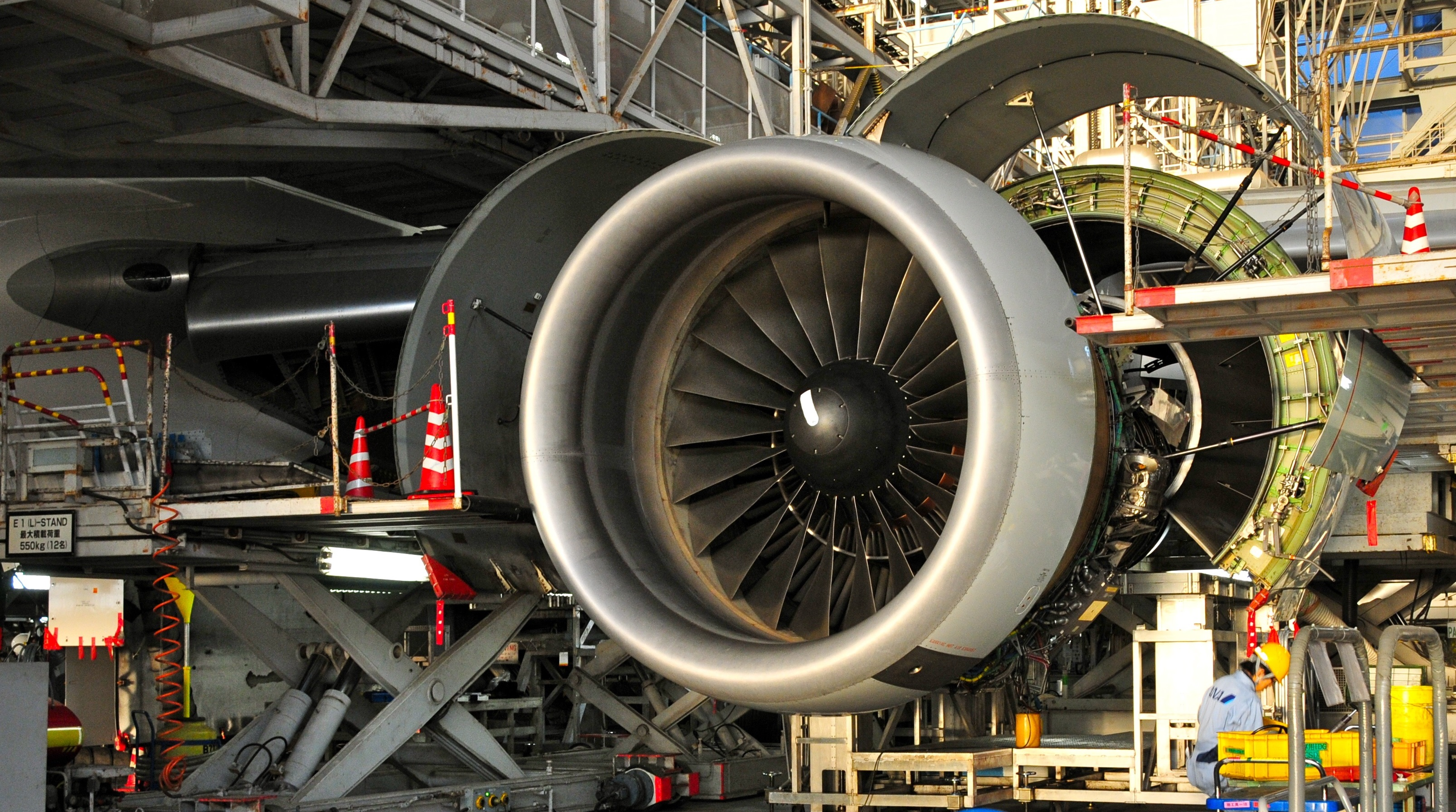
A PW4000 equipped 777 under maintenance, with the fan doors hinged open. The inlet is ahead of the open doors.

The fan cowls are two cylindrical halves located aft of the inlet that enclose the engine fan case and the external engine accessories which provides a smooth aerodynamic surface over the core of the engine fan case. The fan cowls are supported on the forward end by the inlet and on the aft end by the thrust reverser. Additionally, the fan cowls are attached to the fan cowl support beam using four hinges (total of eight) at the top and latched (four latches) at the bottom to allow for the fan cowls to be opened for maintenance.

The engine is certified under Federal Aviation Regulations (FAR) part 33 regulations. To comply with the regulations, the engine successfully demonstrated containment and safe shutdown of an engine after intentional fracture of a fan blade at redline speed. Although it is necessary to install an inlet for proper engine operation during these tests, it is not required that this inlet meet production standards. The test inlet used was of a different design which included an aluminum aft bulkhead instead of the production CFRP aft bulkhead. Additionally, these tests are conducted without the fan cowls attached. The inlet and fan cowls are certified under FAR Part 25 of which Boeing was responsible for.

=== Final report ===
On June 30, 2020, more than two years after the incident, the NTSB determined the probable cause(s) of this incident to be:

The fracture of a fan blade due to P&W's continued classification of the TAI [thermal acoustic imaging] inspection process as a new and emerging technology that permitted them to continue accomplishing the inspection without having to develop a formal, defined initial and recurrent training program or an inspector certification program. The lack of training resulted in the inspector making an incorrect evaluation of an indication that resulted in a blade with a crack being returned to service where it eventually fractured. Contributing to the fracture of the fan blade was the lack of feedback from the process engineers on the fan blades the inspectors sent to the process engineers for evaluation of indications that they had found.

== Reactions ==
Pictures and video of the damaged engine were posted to social media by passengers, and of the landing by an observer on the ground. A closer look at the damaged engine showed that it was missing a fan blade.

== Subsequent action ==
On July 18, 2019, the cockpit crew was awarded the Superior Airmanship Award, presented annually by the Airline Pilots Association, for safely landing the plane.

In 2019 the FAA issued an airworthiness directive mandating recurring engine inspections based on usage cycles, and at that time stated "these thresholds provide an acceptable level of safety". The 6500 flight cycle fan blade inspection interval adopted by the FAA was also adopted and used by other national authorities, until Japan's transport ministry ordered increased inspection frequency after the similar JAL 777-200/PW4000 engine failure incident at Naha Airport (OKA) in Japan on December 4, 2020.

On February 12, 2020, a resident of California and Guam who was a passenger on the flight filed civil suit in the Superior Court of Guam, seeking over $1 million each from United, the Boeing Company, and Pratt & Whitney for severe mental and emotional injuries, including post-traumatic stress disorder, in addition to physical injuries. The lawsuit cites statements made by the captain to the press, including a description of the sensation after the engine failure as, "the aircraft experiencing what felt like 'hit[ting] a brick wall at 500 miles an hour'".

In August 2020, Boeing provided an update to the FAA on its work to also strengthen 777 engine covers. The manufacturer told regulators it had decided to redesign and make replacement covers with which airlines could retrofit their fleets, according to the FAA document. This document was not made public until the contents of internal Boeing documents reviewed by The Wall Street Journal were first published immediately after a similar incident occurred with United Airlines Flight 328 in Denver in 2021.

At the NTSB press briefing two days after the similar United Airlines Flight 328 incident, NTSB Chairman Robert Sumwalt said it remained to be seen whether that engine failure is consistent with this previous incident. "I think what's important is that we really truly understand the facts, circumstances, and conditions around this particular event before we can compare it to any other events," he noted. "But certainly we will want to know if there's a similarity."
