= United Airlines Flight 328 =

2021 aircraft incident over Colorado

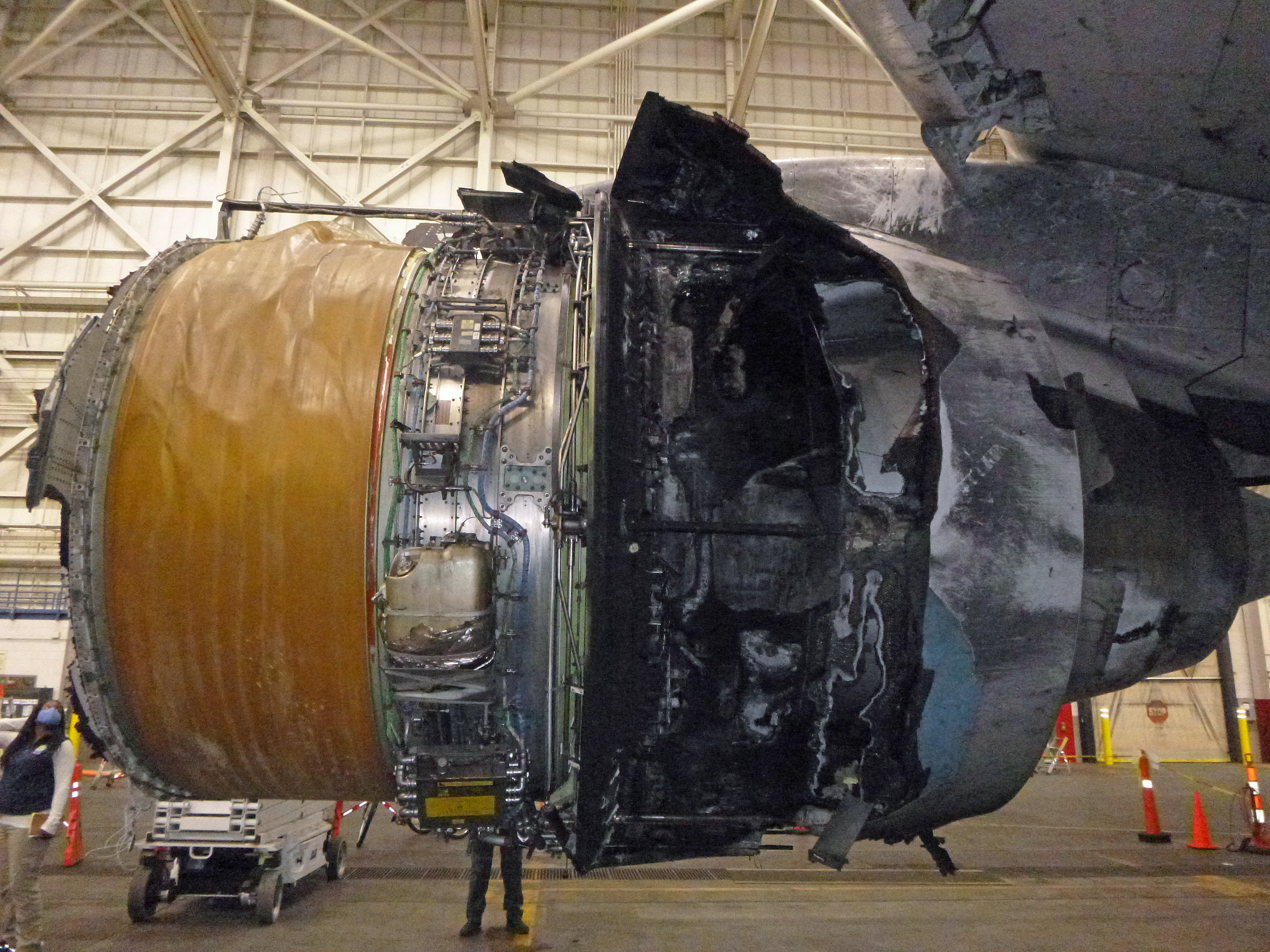
- The inboard side of the right engine showing the damage

Incident
- Date: February 20, 2021
- Summary: Engine failure caused by metal fatigue
- Site: Over Broomfield, Colorado, United States; 39°55′45″N 104°57′52″W

Aircraft
- N772UA, the aircraft involved in the incident, pictured in 2018
- Aircraft type: Boeing 777-222 (Note: The airliner was a Boeing 777-200 model; Boeing assigns a unique code for each company that buys one of its airliners, which is applied as a suffix to the model number at the time the aircraft is built, hence "777-222" designates a 777-200 built for United Airlines (customer code 22).)
- Operator: United Airlines
- IATA flight No.: UA328
- ICAO flight No.: UAL328
- Call sign: UNITED 328
- Registration: N772UA
- Flight origin: Denver International Airport, Colorado, United States
- Destination: Daniel K. Inouye International Airport, Honolulu, Hawaii, United States
- Occupants: 241
- Passengers: 231
- Crew: 10
- Fatalities: 0
- Survivors: 241

Flight path of United Airlines Flight 328

On February 20, 2021, United Airlines Flight 328, a scheduled domestic flight from Denver to Honolulu, suffered a contained engine failure shortly after takeoff from Denver International Airport (DEN). The aircraft, a Boeing 777 powered by Pratt & Whitney (P&W) model PW4077 turbofan engines, experienced a fan blade separation due to metal fatigue causing an engine fire and extensive damage to the nacelle. Despite being classified as a contained failure, as the fan blade fragments remained inside the nacelle, large parts of the engine's cowling, inlet and thrust reverser detached, creating a debris field over 1 mile (1.6 km) long across residential areas of Broomfield, Colorado.

The falling debris damaged private property, including the roof of a home and a parked vehicle. Witnesses captured footage of falling debris on smartphones and a dash cam, while passengers recorded video of the damaged engine and posted it to social media. The fuselage sustained minor damage, but the crew was able to shut down the affected engine and return safely to Denver, landing on runway 26 at 1:28 pm MST (06:28 UTC), 24 minutes after departure. No injuries were reported among the 231 passengers and 10 crew, or on the ground.

The U.S. National Transportation Safety Board (NTSB) opened an investigation into the incident. In response, the U.S. Federal Aviation Administration (FAA) issued an Emergency Airworthiness Directive requiring immediate inspection of Pratt & Whitney PW4000-series engine fan blades before further flight. Similar 777-200 aircraft were temporarily grounded by multiple aviation regulators around the world. Japan Airlines, which had experienced a similar engine issue in December 2020, retired its PW4000-powered 777-200s earlier than planned in March 2021. United Airlines, which also had a similar incident in February 2018, grounded its fleet of PW4000-powered 777-200s from early 2021 until July 2022.

== Background ==
=== Aircraft ===
The aircraft involved, registered as N772UA, is a Boeing 777-222, the United Airlines-specific variant of the original 777-200 series. It was built in November 1994 (c/n 26930/Line no.5) and delivered to United in September 1995. Originally the aircraft was designated WA005 (a Boeing reference number), one of the original Boeing 777-200s that took part in the flight test certification program prior to its entry into commercial service. Boeing stopped building the 777 with P&W PW4000 series engines in 2013.

The Boeing 777 is a long-range, wide-body, twin-engine aircraft. At the time of the incident it had a relatively low accident fatality rate. The only two 777 crashes with total loss of aircraft (passengers and crew) are Malaysia Airlines Flight 17 that was shot down over Ukraine on July 17, 2014, and Malaysia Airlines Flight 370 that disappeared on March 8, 2014. The other fatal accidents, Emirates Flight 521 and Asiana Airlines Flight 214, were both attributed to pilot error. Two other hull losses with passenger injuries occurred: EgyptAir Flight 667 had a cockpit fire while parked at the gate at Cairo Airport, and British Airways Flight 38 crashed on landing at Heathrow Airport. The latter was attributed to a design defect in its Rolls-Royce Trent 895-17 engines, not the P&W engines on this incident aircraft.

=== Crew ===
The captain, Mark Stephenson (60), had been with United Airlines since 1990; the first officer, Michael DeVore (53), joined United in 1999. Both pilots were based in San Francisco. The captain had a total of 28,062 hours of flight time, with 538 hours in the Boeing 777 and the first officer reported a total of 18,612 hours of flight time, with 4,190 in the Boeing 777. During the incident, Stephenson was the pilot flying, and DeVore was the pilot monitoring.

=== Engine ===
The original 777-200 was distinctive for its Pratt & Whitney PW4000 engines that are about as wide as a Boeing 737 fuselage. The PW4077 variant used on the United 777-222 nominally produces 77,000 pounds-force (340 kN) of thrust. It is a dual-spool, axial-flow, high bypass turbofan engine, that is a higher bypass version of the PW4000-94 engine originally fitted to the Boeing 747-400. It was redesigned exclusively for the 777 with a larger 112-inch (280 cm) diameter fan section using 22 hollow-core fan blades. The PW4000-112 fan blade is a wide-chord airfoil made of a titanium alloy, about 40.5 inches (103 cm) long and about 22.25 inches (56.5 cm) wide at the blade tip. A PW4000-112 fan blade can weigh a maximum of 34.85 pounds (15.81 kg).

The hollow-core fan blade that experienced metal fatigue failure in this incident had only undergone 2,979 cycles since its last trip to the P&W factory for nondestructive testing using thermal acoustic imaging (TAI) to find hidden internal defects. This interval is less than half of the 6,500 cycle test frequency established in 2019 after a similar engine failure on a previous United Airlines 777-222 flight to Honolulu (UA1175) in 2018. The subject blade underwent TAI inspections in 2014 and 2016. The TAI inspection data collected in 2016 was re-examined in 2018 after the UA1175 incident.

Japan's transport ministry ordered increased inspection frequency after the similar JAL 777-200/PW4000 engine failure incident at Naha Airport (OKA) in Japan on December 4, 2020. The US Federal Aviation Administration was also considering increased inspections as a result of that incident, but had not acted prior to this incident in Denver.

== Incident ==
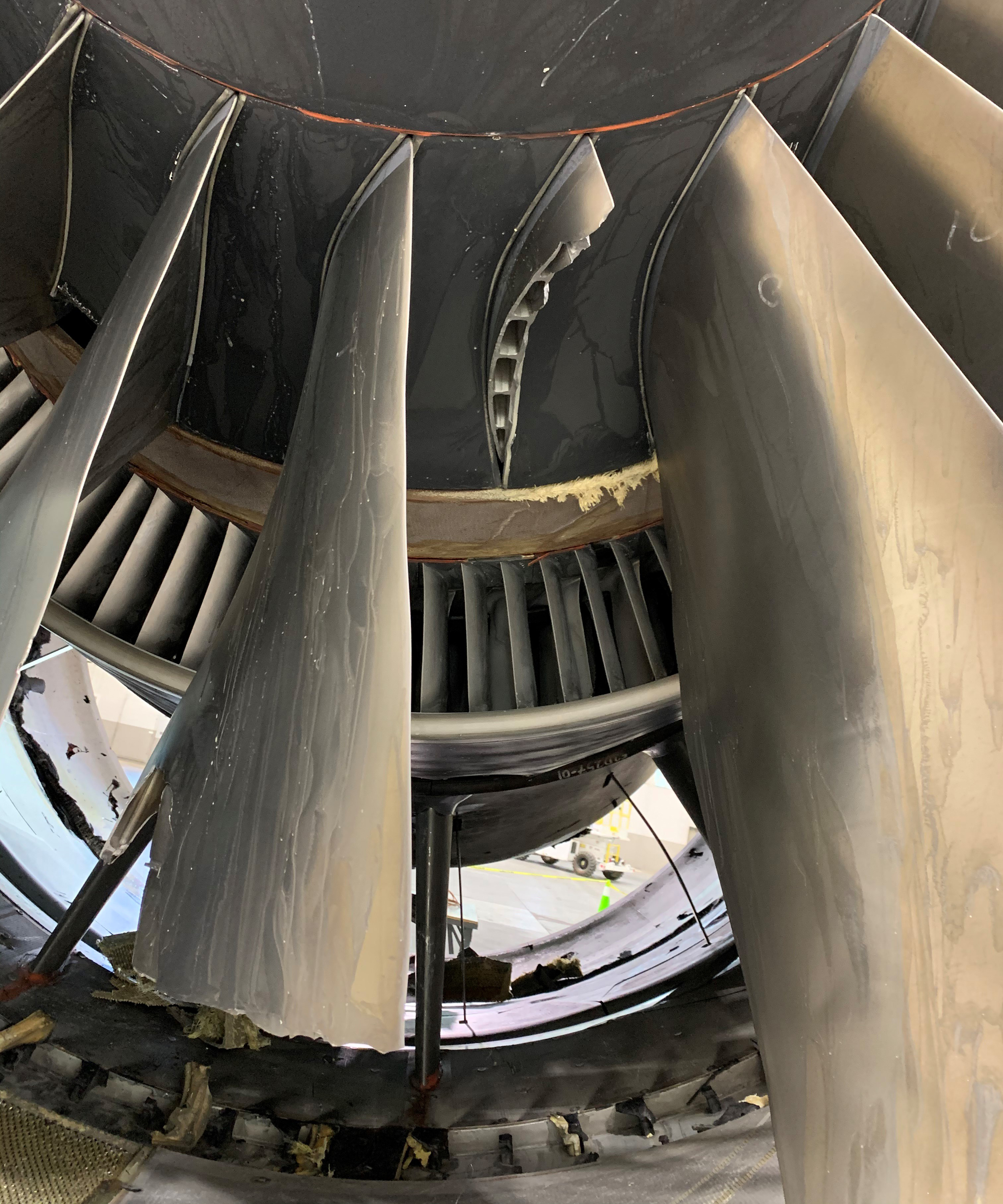
Damage to PW4000 hollow fan blades from UA328. Note fracture surface near hub at top of photo. (NTSB photo)

The aircraft arrived at Denver International Airport (DEN) as flight UA2465 at 10:50 local time. At 13:04 local time it departed normally from Runway 25 en route to Daniel K. Inouye International Airport (HNL) as flight UA328. According to Flight Data Recorder (FDR) data and flight crew interviews by NTSB, about four minutes after takeoff, the airplane was climbing through an altitude of about 12,500 feet (3,800 m) with an airspeed of about 280 knots (320 mph; 520 km/h). The flight crew indicated to the NTSB that they advanced power at that time to minimize time in expected turbulence during their climb up to their assigned altitude of flight level 230 (roughly 23,000 ft or 7,000 m). Immediately after the throttles were advanced, a loud bang was recorded on the cockpit voice recorder (CVR). FDR data indicated the engine made an uncommanded shutdown and the engine fire warning activated shortly after. A fan blade out failure within the right (#2) engine resulted in parts of the engine cowling disintegrating and falling to the ground in Broomfield, Colorado. No one on the ground or in the aircraft was injured, although flying debris resulted in a hole in the wing to body fairing, a non-critical composite part designed to reduce aerodynamic drag.

The flight crew contacted air traffic control to declare an emergency and request a left turn to return to the airport. The flight crew began to complete checklists, including the engine fire checklist. As part of the checklist, the flight crew discharged both fire extinguisher bottles into the engine, but the engine fire warning did not extinguish until the airplane was on an extended downwind for landing. The flight crew continued to prepare for the emergency landing by completing additional critical checklists and verifying airplane performance for landing. They elected not to dump fuel for safety and time reasons and determined that the excess landing weight was not significant enough to outweigh other considerations.

The captain accomplished a one-engine-inoperative approach and landing to runway 26 without further incident. Airport rescue and firefighting (ARFF) met the airplane as soon as it stopped on the runway and applied water and foaming agent to the right engine. The base of the engine experienced a flare up, which was quickly extinguished. Once cleared by ARFF, the airplane was towed off the runway where the passengers disembarked via air stairs and were bussed to the terminal. Passengers were re-booked on flight UA3025—operated by a different Boeing 777, N773UA, a sister ship to N772UA immediately ahead of it on the production line—that took off hours later. N773UA had previously experienced an extremely similar engine failure in 2018 as United Airlines Flight 1175 from San Francisco to Honolulu.

=== Similar incidents ===
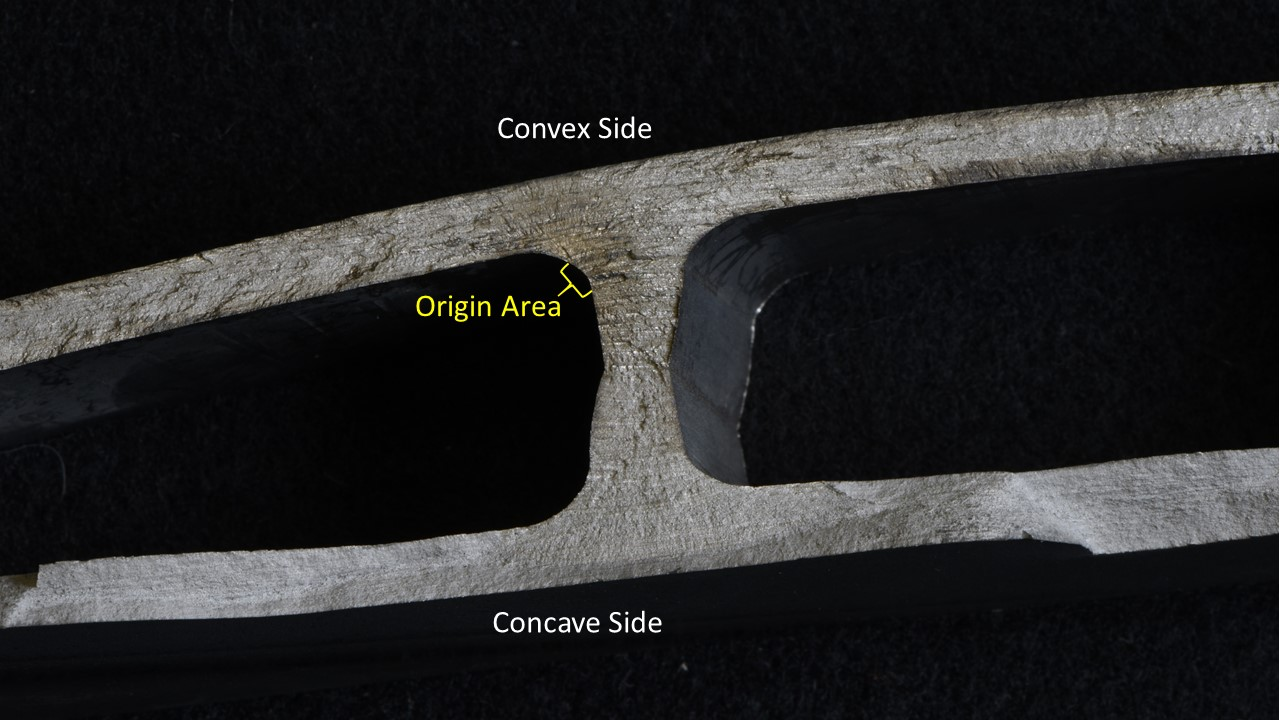
Photo of UA328 fan blade's fracture surface with the origin area identified (NTSB photo)

Media analysis of this incident frequently cited three related catastrophic engine failure incidents involving Pratt & Whitney PW4000 series turbofan engines: two previous incidents on the same 777-200 aircraft family with the PW4000-112 series engines with hollow-core fan blades that developed internal cracks, and one contemporaneous incident on an older widebody aircraft design with the original PW4000-94 series engine. At his press briefing two days after the incident, NTSB Chairman Robert Sumwalt said it remained to be seen whether the failure is consistent with a previous incident in February 2018 on United Airlines. "I think what's important is that we really truly understand the facts, circumstances, and conditions around this particular event before we can compare it to any other events," he noted. "But certainly we will want to know if there's a similarity."

==== United Airlines Flight 1175 ====
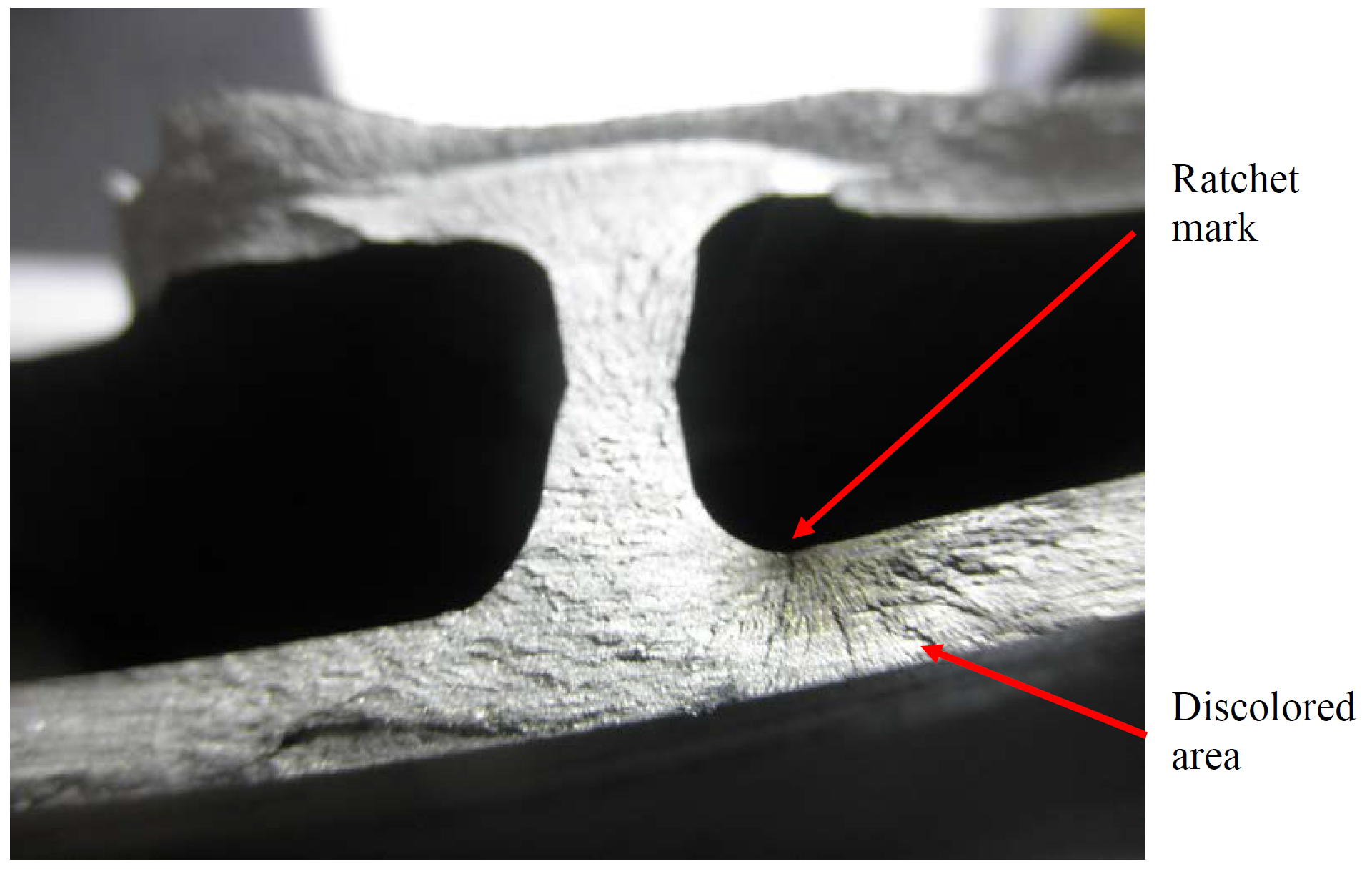
Fracture surface of UA1175 fan blade showing discolored area and ratchet mark radiating from an interior surface of the fan blade (NTSB Photo)

On February 13, 2018, the same replacement aircraft used to accommodate the passengers from this incident, N773UA, originating from San Francisco as United Airlines Flight 1175 (UA1175), had a similar engine failure and loss of the engine cowling. This incident occurred over the Pacific Ocean approximately 120 miles (190 km) from Honolulu (HNL). The flight descended continuously from 36,000 feet (11,000 m) and landed at HNL approximately 40 minutes later with no reported injuries or loss of life. The aircraft was eventually repaired and returned to service.

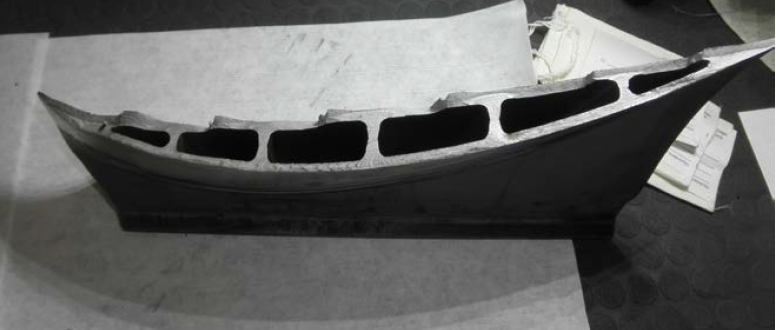
UA1175 No. 11 fan blade root section fracture surface (NTSB photo)

The separated inlet cowl and fan doors fell in the ocean; unlike the UA328 incident, they were not recovered. The NTSB determined that a fan blade fractured from a pre-existing metal fatigue crack that had been slowly propagating since 2010, leading to the failure. The investigation faulted Pratt & Whitney for not identifying the crack in two previous inspections due to a lack of training in Pratt & Whitney's thermal acoustic image (TAI) inspection process, resulting in "an incorrect evaluation of an indication that resulted in a blade with a crack being returned to service where it eventually fractured." Boeing had been working on a redesign for a replacement fan cowl as a result of that incident, according to documents reviewed by the Wall Street Journal.

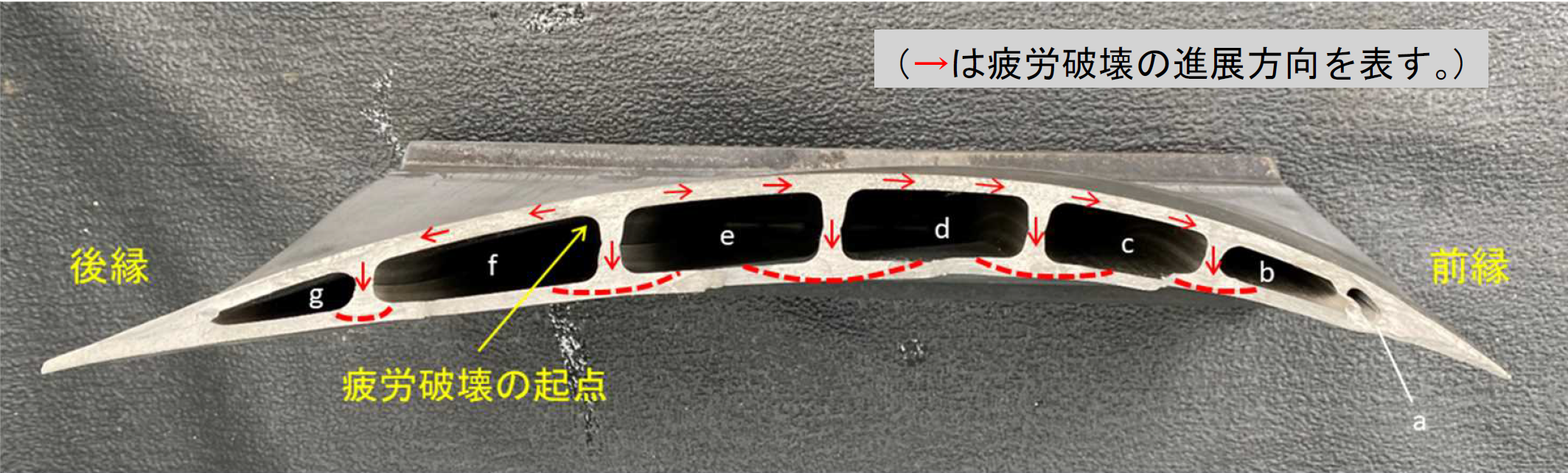
Failed fan blade from JL904. Yellow arrow legend: "origin of fatigue fracture." Red arrow legend: "indicates the direction of fatigue fracture." (JTSB photo)

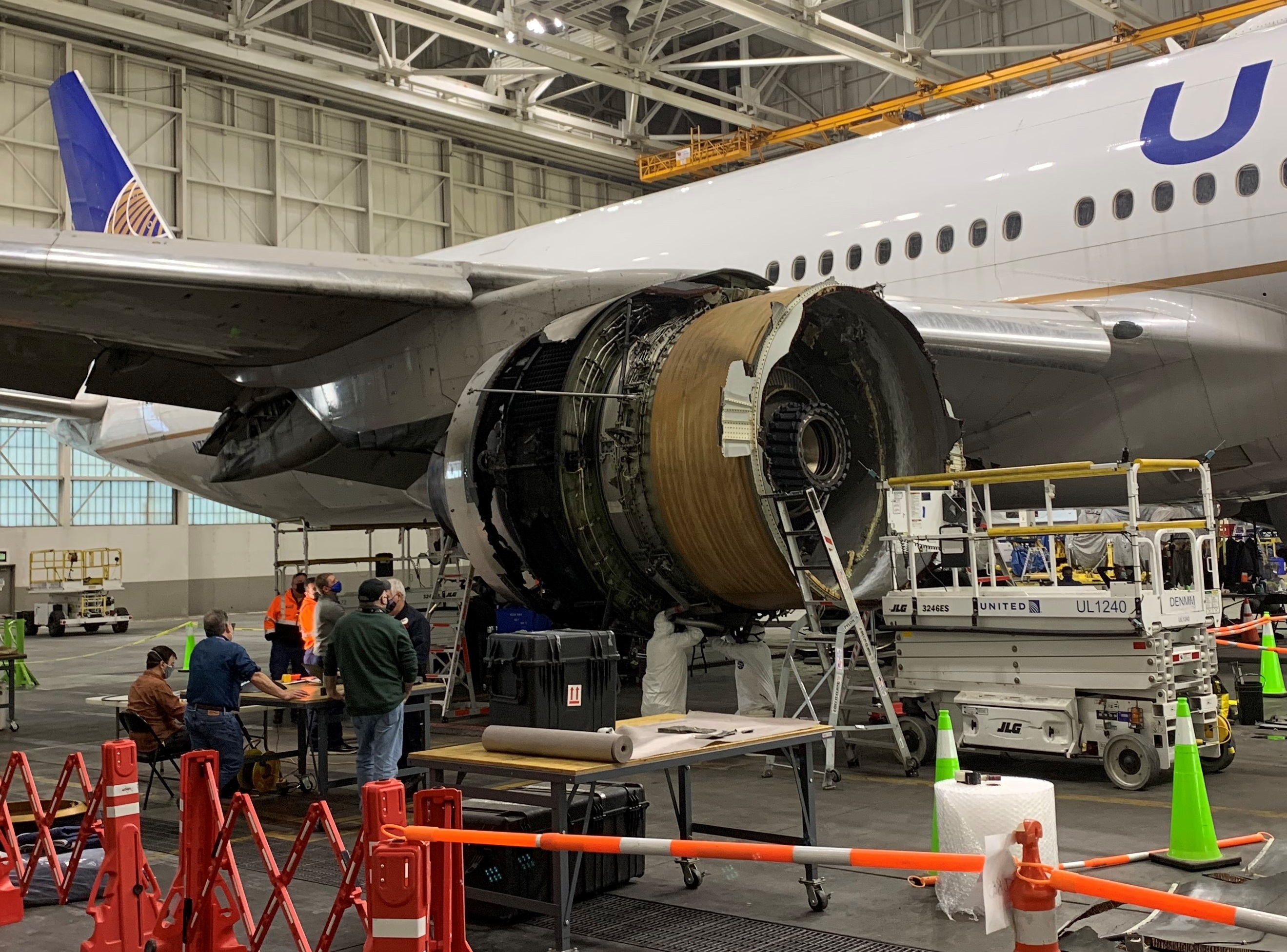
Photograph showing damage to UA328 right engine cowling, including the loss of the inlet fairing and fan doors (NTSB photo)

==== Japan Airlines Flight 904 ====
On December 4, 2020, a 777-289 (JA8978, ex-Japan Air System) operated as JL904 from Okinawa-Naha Airport (OKA), also experienced a similar fan blade out failure and partial loss of the fan cowl six minutes after takeoff at an altitude of 16,000 feet (5,000 m). It returned to OKA and landed safely, but the Japan Transport Safety Board considered it a "serious incident" and launched an investigation. They later confirmed that the engine also had two broken fan blades, one with a metal fatigue fracture, similar to both United incidents. The Ex-JAS 777-289 version is powered by a PW4074 engine variant rated for 74,000 pounds-force (330 kN) of thrust.

==== Longtail Aviation Flight 5504 ====
Coincidentally, on the same day as the United 328 incident, a Boeing 747-400BCF operating as Longtail Aviation flight LGT-5504, experienced an uncontained engine failure shortly after departing Maastricht Airport in the Netherlands, and two people were injured by debris that also fell in a residential area. That aircraft was powered by four PW4056 engines, a version of the earlier PW4000-94 engine.

== Investigation ==
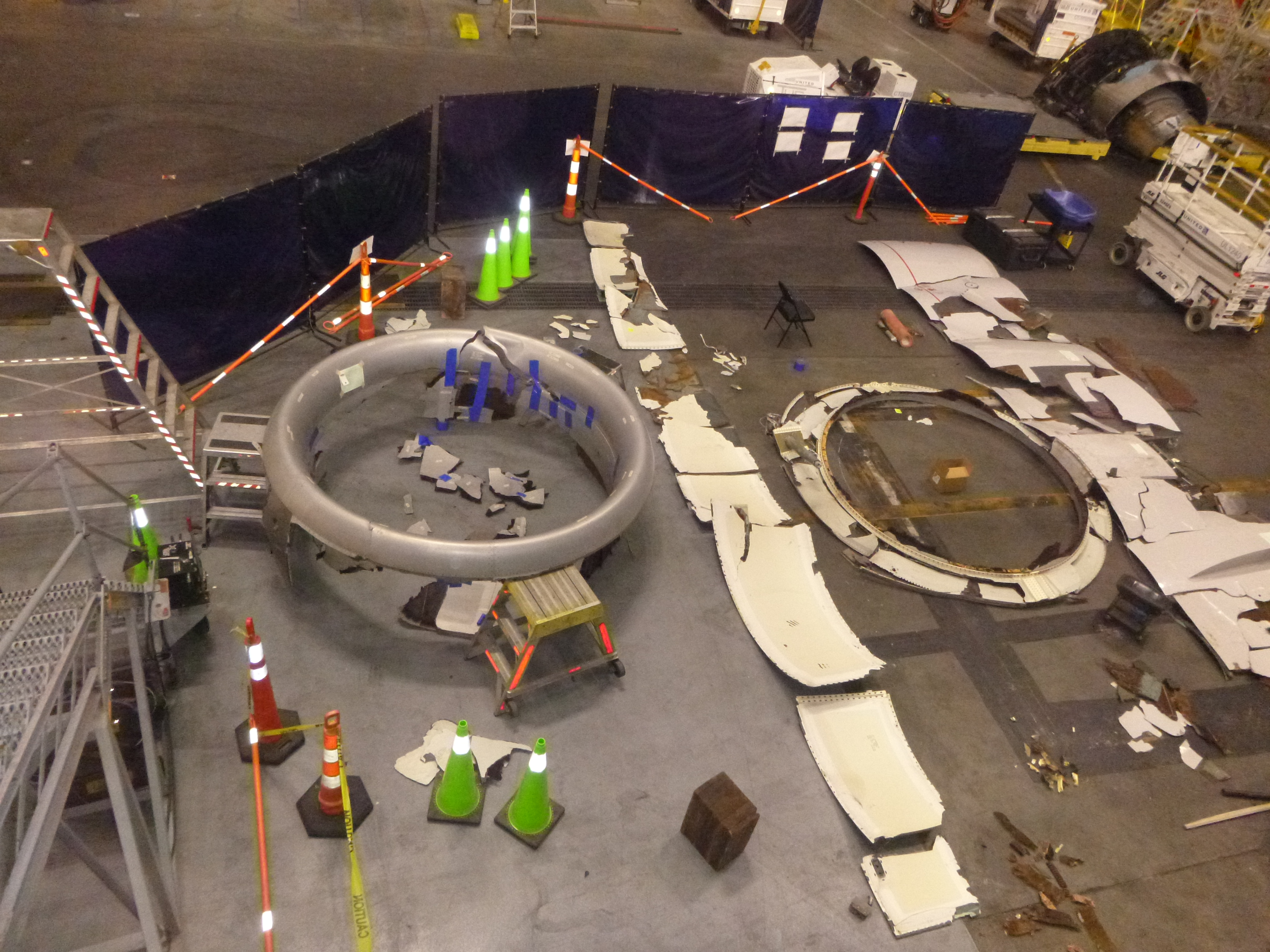
Recovered inlet cowl and cowling debris laid out in hangar

The National Transportation Safety Board (NTSB) investigatied the incident. An NTSB structures engineer and two investigators from the NTSB's Denver office collected fallen debris with local law enforcement and safety agencies over several days immediately after the incident. Most of the structure from the inlet cowl and fan cowl doors that separated from the aircraft was recovered and identified. Recovered portions of the inlet cowl, fan cowl door structure, and inlet cowl attach ring were laid out in a hangar (pictured). The inlet cowl, fan cowl doors, and thrust reversers will be examined further by NTSB investigators to map damage and cowl failure patterns after the fan blade failure, and to examine the subsequent progression of fire in the thrust reversers.

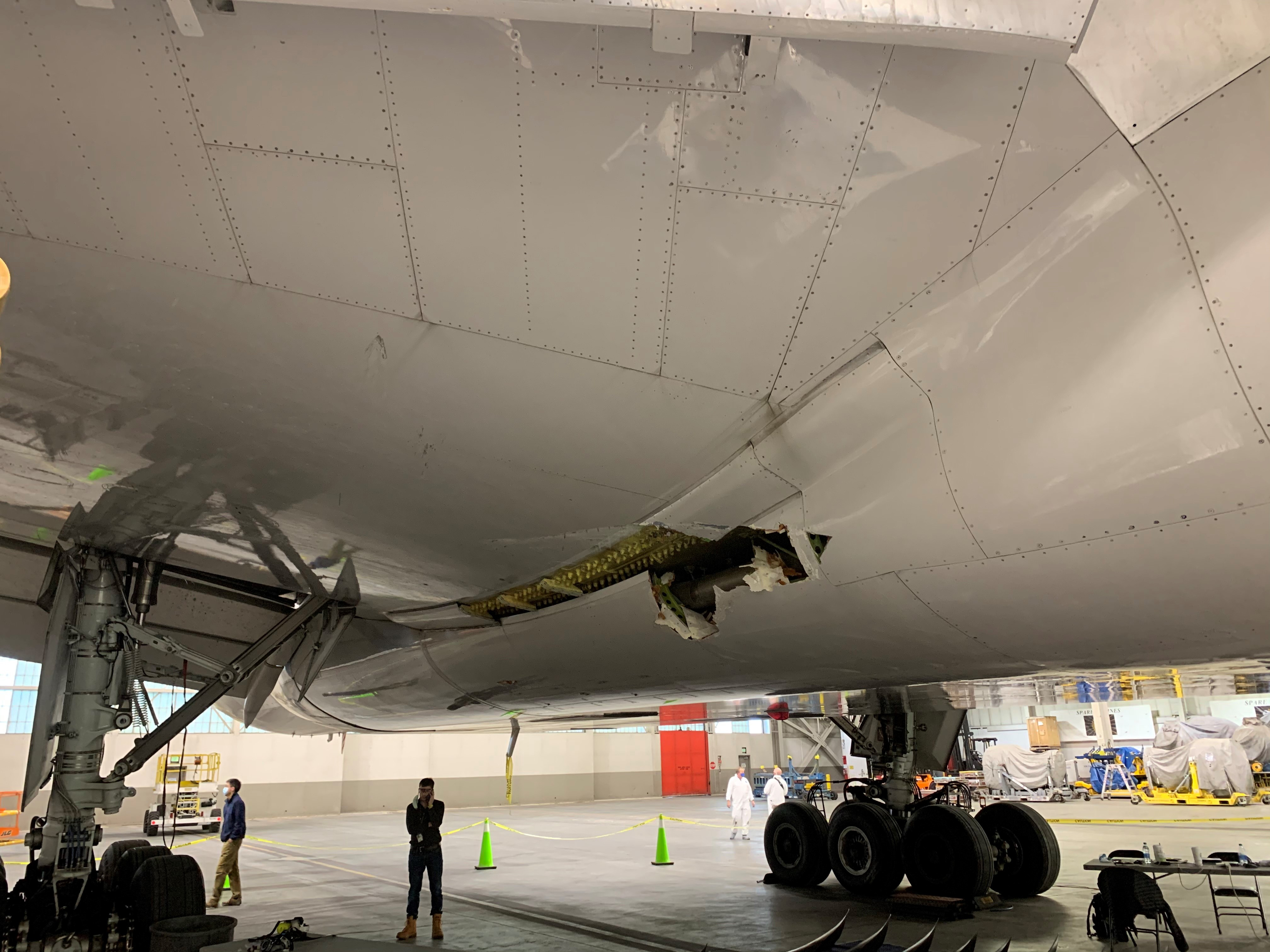
Damage to the wing and the body fairing of United Airlines flight 328

The NTSB noted upon initial inspection two fan blades had fractured, one near its root and an adjacent one about mid-span; a portion of one blade was embedded in the containment ring. The remainder of the fan blades exhibited damage to the tips and leading edges. The failed blades were removed and flown by private jet to Pratt & Whitney's laboratory in Hartford, Connecticut for further examination.

On February 22, 2021, National Transportation Safety Board Chairman Robert Sumwalt announced that the damage to the fan blade is consistent with metal fatigue, according to a preliminary assessment. Sumwalt also said that, "by our strictest definition," the NTSB did not consider the incident an uncontained engine failure because, "the containment ring contained the parts as they were flying out." He said the NTSB will look into why the engine cowling separated from the aircraft and why there was a fire, despite indications that the fuel supply to the engine had been turned off.

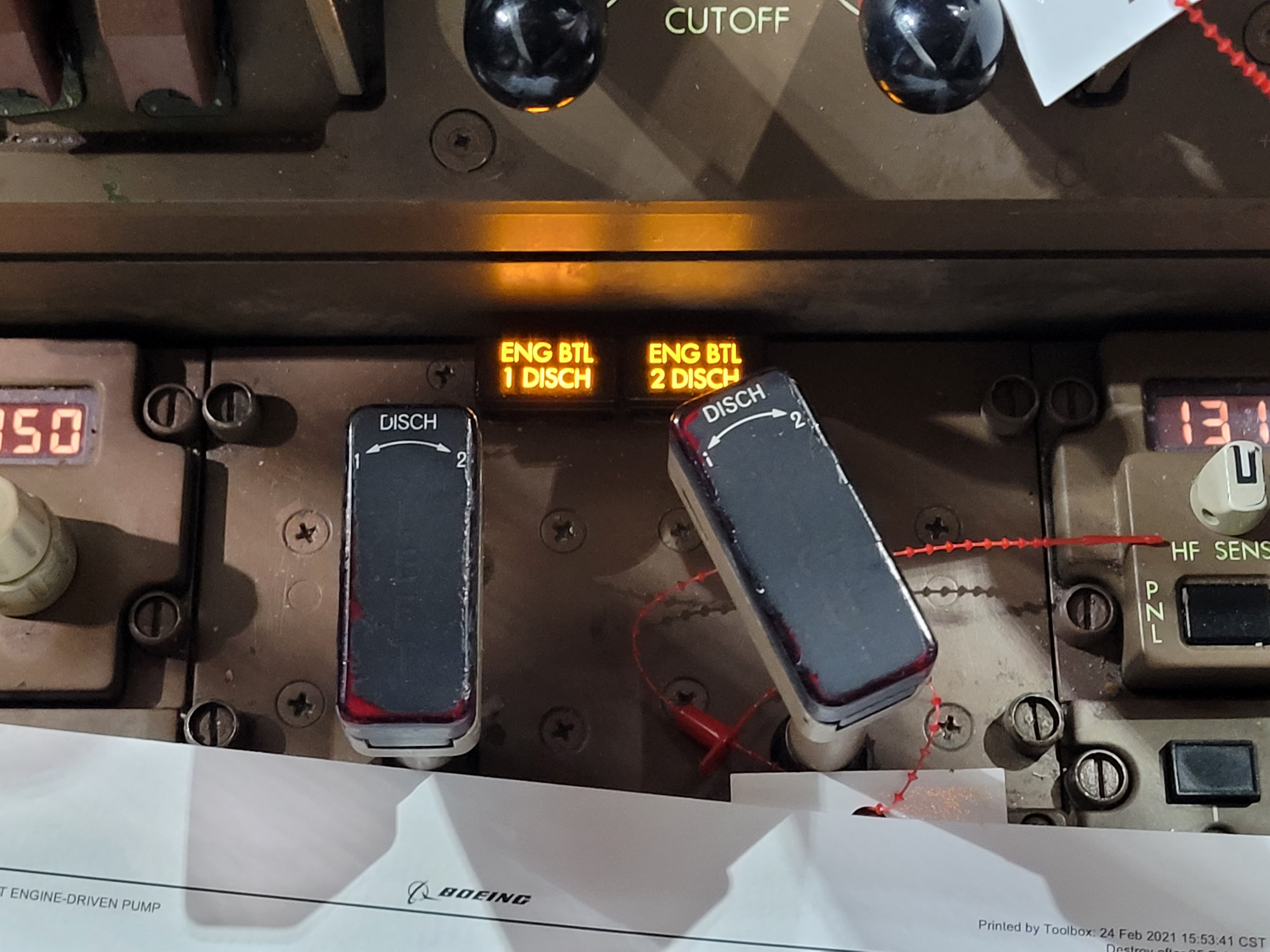
Right engine fire switch and fire bottle status lights in the cockpit.

On March 5, 2021, the NTSB released an update on the incident. They provided more detail on their preliminary examination of the right engine fire damage, saying they found it was primarily contained to the engine's accessory components, thrust reverser skin, and composite honeycomb structure of the inboard and outboard thrust reversers. Both halves of the aft cowl appeared to be intact and undamaged. The spar valve, which stops fuel flow to the engine when the fire switch is pulled in the cockpit, was found closed; there was no evidence of a fuel-fed fire. Examination of the cockpit found that the right engine fire switch had been pulled and turned to the "DISCH 1" position, and both fire bottle discharge lights were illuminated. Examination of the engine accessories showed multiple broken fuel, oil, and hydraulic lines and that the gearbox was fractured.

In addition, the NTSB stated in this update that initial examination of the right engine fan revealed that the spinner and spinner cap were in place and appeared to be undamaged. The fan hub was intact but could not be rotated by hand. All fan blade roots were in place in the fan hub, and two blades were fractured. One fan blade was fractured transversely across the airfoil and the blade's fracture surface was consistent with fatigue. A second fan blade was fractured transversely across the airfoil and the second blade's fracture surfaces had shear lips consistent with an overload failure. The remaining fan blades were full length but all had varying degrees of impact damage to the airfoils.

=== Final report ===
On September 8, 2023, the NTSB published their final report on the accident. The report revealed that the fatigue failure in the right engine was due to inadequate inspections and insufficient frequency of inspections to catch low-level crack indications. The low-level cracks continued to propagate until their ultimate failure. Additionally, the use of carbon-fiber reinforced plastic to make the engine inlet, instead of aluminum as used during certification tests, caused the inlet to fail to adequately dissipate the energy of the fan-blade out event failing to prevent additional damage.

The NTSB found the severity of the fire damage was due to failure of "K" flanges after the blade failure. Failure of the flanges allowed hot ignition gases to spread and damage components that carried flammable fluids. The fire then propagated to undercowl and thrust reverser areas where the fire could not be extinguished.

== Reactions ==
Central portion of first image of aircraft debris tweeted out by Broomfield Police illustrating their response to the event. Image shows the engine inlet rim fairing where it landed.

- At 13:41, the Broomfield, Colorado Police Department posted on Twitter: "Getting reports that a plane flying over @broomfield had engine trouble and dropped debris in several neighborhoods around 1:08 pm." The department continued to update the thread, confirming that the aircraft landed safely at Denver International Airport and there were no reported injuries. They also posted several photos showing debris that had been reported, asking the public not to touch or move debris, and to report it to their non-emergency number. At an impromptu press conference at Broomfield County Commons Park, where several pieces of debris landed, Public Information Officer Rachel Welte described their response to a flood of calls from the public, adding, "It's actually remarkable, given the amount of people that are at this park this time of day, we are absolutely fortunate that no one was injured."

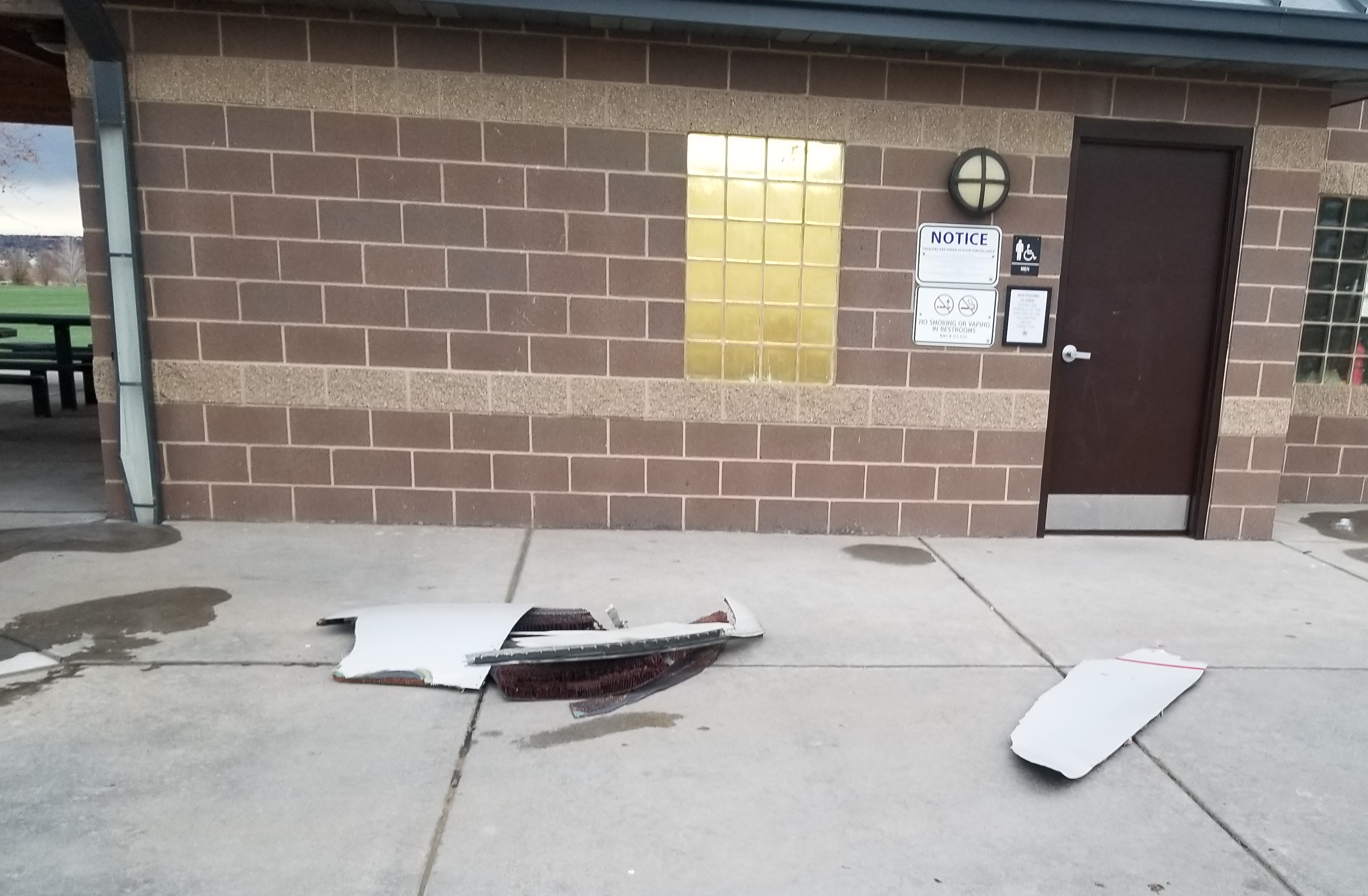
Engine nacelle fragments from UA328 found in front of Broomfield County Commons Park restroom.

- On February 22, the day after the UA328 incident:
  - The Japanese Ministry of Land, Infrastructure, Transport and Tourism ordered the grounding of 32 Boeing 777 aircraft operated by Japan Airlines and All Nippon Airways.
  - The U.S. Federal Aviation Administration (FAA) ordered increased inspections of Boeing 777 aircraft with PW4000 engines;
    - United Airlines preemptively removed all such airliners (of which it has 28 in storage, and 24 in use) from active service.
  - Boeing recommended worldwide grounding of all 128 of its Boeing 777-200 series aircraft equipped with Pratt & Whitney PW4000-112 engines.
  - The British Civil Aviation Authority banned PW4000-112-powered Boeing 777s from entering UK airspace, although no British airlines operated that type of aircraft.
  - Transport Canada stated that a ban of the type was being considered in Canadian airspace. Although no airlines in Canada had 777's with the PW4000, the Transportation Safety Board of Canada considered precautions.
- On February 23, Pratt & Whitney released a statement that the company was cooperating with federal investigators and coordinating with operators and regulators to support a revised inspection interval of the PW4000 engines.
- On February 24, the FAA followed its counterparts in the other countries and issued an Emergency Airworthiness Directive (EAD) that required U.S. operators of airplanes equipped with certain Pratt & Whitney PW4000 engines to inspect these engines' fan blades with thermal acoustic imaging before further flight, grounding the US fleet only operated by United. Industry observers noted the FAA issued its EAD unusually quickly, just three days after the incident, and speculated this newfound urgency resulted from the Boeing 737 MAX crisis.
- On February 25, an industry source noted the fan blade inspections take approximately 8 hours per blade, and P&W could only process blades at the rate of 10 sets of 22 per engine per month. Consequently, the aircraft affected would only re-enter service very slowly, unless the FAA decides to relax the TAI inspection requirements after evaluating the initial results.
- On April 5, Japan Airlines said that it had, "decided to accelerate the retirement of all P&W equipped Boeing 777 by March 2021, which (was) originally planned by March 2022."
- On April 21, United Airlines announced that their Boeing 777-200s with PW4000 engines would be returned to service in the near future. A week later, the British Civil Aviation Authority lifted its ban on Boeing 777's with the PW4000 engines, allowing them to enter UK airspace again.
- On May 12, at a Federal Aviation Administration Safety Oversight Hearing before the United States House of Representatives transportation sub-committee, FAA Administrator Stephen Dickson said the agency is "requiring the manufacturers to address strengthen(ing) the cowling" on Boeing 777-200 aircraft equipped with Pratt & Whitney engines. Separately, the agency said the timing "will depend on the completion of design and engineering work and will be approved by the FAA." and Boeing said it was continuing to work with the FAA on "potential design improvements" for the inlet and fan cowlings, but added that the, "work is exacting and time consuming."
- On June 28, the grounded United Airlines 777-200s still had not returned to service, so United announced a schedule revision to meet high demand for flights to Hawaii, but said they "anticipate the Pratt and Whitney 777s returning soon".
- On August 30, The Wall Street Journal reported that United's grounded 777-200s were unlikely to return to service until 2022 due to additional safety measures.
- On May 17, 2022, the FAA allowed United's 777-200s to resume service.
- Jin Air returned its first 777 to service on June 12, 2022.

=== Groundings by aircraft operators ===
The following operators grounded their 777-200 series aircraft within a week of the incident:

As of 24 February 2021
Airline	In service	In storage	Total
United Airlines	24	28	52
All Nippon Airways	10	14	24
Japan Airlines	7	13	20
Korean Air	7	10	17
Asiana Airlines	6	1	7
Jin Air	4	–	4
Total	58	66	124

== See also ==
- British Airways Flight 2276, in 2015
- Air France Flight 066, in 2017
- Delta Air Lines Flight 30, in 2018
- Qantas Flight 32, in 2010
- Southwest Airlines Flight 1380, in 2018
- Korean Air Flight 2708, in 2016
- Southwest Airlines Flight 3472, in 2016
- Volga-Dnepr Airlines Flight 4066, in 2020
- Longtail Aviation Flight 5504 – a Boeing 747 that suffered a similar incident the same day
