= Thermal acoustic imaging =

Nondestructive testing method

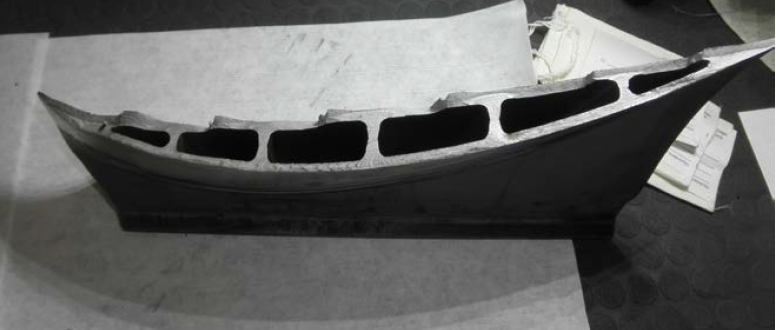
PW4000-112 hollow-core fan blade root fragment showing fracture surface due to metal fatigue crack on United Airlines Flight 1175. This defect was not properly detected by a TAI inspection (NTSB photo)

Thermal acoustic imaging (TAI) is an active thermographic inspection process developed by Pratt and Whitney (P&W) in 2005. TAI is a nondestructive testing (NDT) method to detect internal and external cracking of hollow-core metallic turbofan engine fan blades. Considered proprietary by P&W, TAI is performed to inspect the PW4000 112-inch (2,800 mm) diameter fan blades in an enclosed air-conditioned room within the engine manufacturer's overhaul and repair facility in East Hartford, Connecticut.

== Technical description ==
In the TAI process, sound energy is applied to excite the fan blade. If a discontinuity exists in the metal, the excitation will cause each side of the contacting discontinuity to move, resulting in frictional heating. The frictional heating is detected on the surface of the fan blade by a thermal imaging sensor.

To examine a complete fan blade, the convex and concave surfaces of the fan blade airfoil are divided into zones and the computer controlled thermal sensor takes an image of each zone while sound energy is applied. After both sides of the fan blade have been completely scanned, the images are processed by a computer and then displayed on a monitor for evaluation by an inspector. The computer can enhance the image to assist the inspector in evaluating any indications. Some indeterminate indications may require reinspection, which in turn may require repainting of the fan blade and repeating the TAI process. If a fan blade has an indication the inspector is not able to evaluate conclusively, the inspector should forward the images along with the fan blade to a process engineer for further evaluation, including by ultrasonic or x-ray inspection.

== History ==
In 2005, when TAI was initiated, P&W, following standard NDT industry practice, categorized the TAI as a new and emerging technology that allowed TAI to be performed without establishing a formal training program and certification requirements.

In 2018, P&W continued to categorize TAI as a new and emerging technology, despite the manufacture and subsequent TAI inspection of over 9,000 fan blades. In the final report on the 2018 United Airlines Flight 1175 (UA1175) contained engine failure of its PW4000-112 series engine, where the fractured fan blade was found to have had a rejectable indication at the previous TAI inspection that was not properly identified, the National Transportation Safety Board faulted P&W for this, concluding the probable cause of the UA1175 incident was:

the fracture of a fan blade due to P&W's continued classification of the TAI inspection process as a new and emerging technology that permitted them to continue accomplishing the inspection without having to develop a formal, defined initial and recurrent training program or an inspector certification program. The lack of training resulted in the inspector making an incorrect evaluation of an indication that resulted in a blade with a crack being returned to service where it eventually fractured.

After this incident, P&W initiated an overinspection and reviewed the TAI inspection records for all 9,606 previously inspected PW4000 112-inch fan blades. During the overinspection, there were two fan blades that were in service at Korean Air and United Airlines that had TAI indications that could not be resolved. Subsequent x-ray inspection of both revealed peening shot in the cavity in the area where the previous TAI indication had been reported. P&W also reported that between December 2004 and the time of the UA1175 incident in 2018, cracks had been detected in five PW4000 112-inch fan blades. One was identified visually and the other four were detected by TAI.

On February 23, 2021, four days after a similar contained engine failure incident that occurred in another PW4000 engine on United Airlines Flight 328 (UA328), the U.S. Federal Aviation Administration (FAA) issued an emergency airworthiness directive that required U.S. operators of airplanes equipped with Pratt & Whitney PW4000-112 engines to inspect these engines before further flight. After reviewing the available data and considering other safety factors, the FAA determined that operators must conduct a TAI inspection of the large titanium fan blades located at the front of each engine. FAA noted that TAI technology can detect cracks on the interior surfaces of the hollow fan blades, or in areas that cannot be seen during a visual inspection. The previous inspection interval for this engine was 6,500 flight cycles.
