= Pratt & Whitney PW4000 =

High-bypass turbofan aircraft engine

PW4000
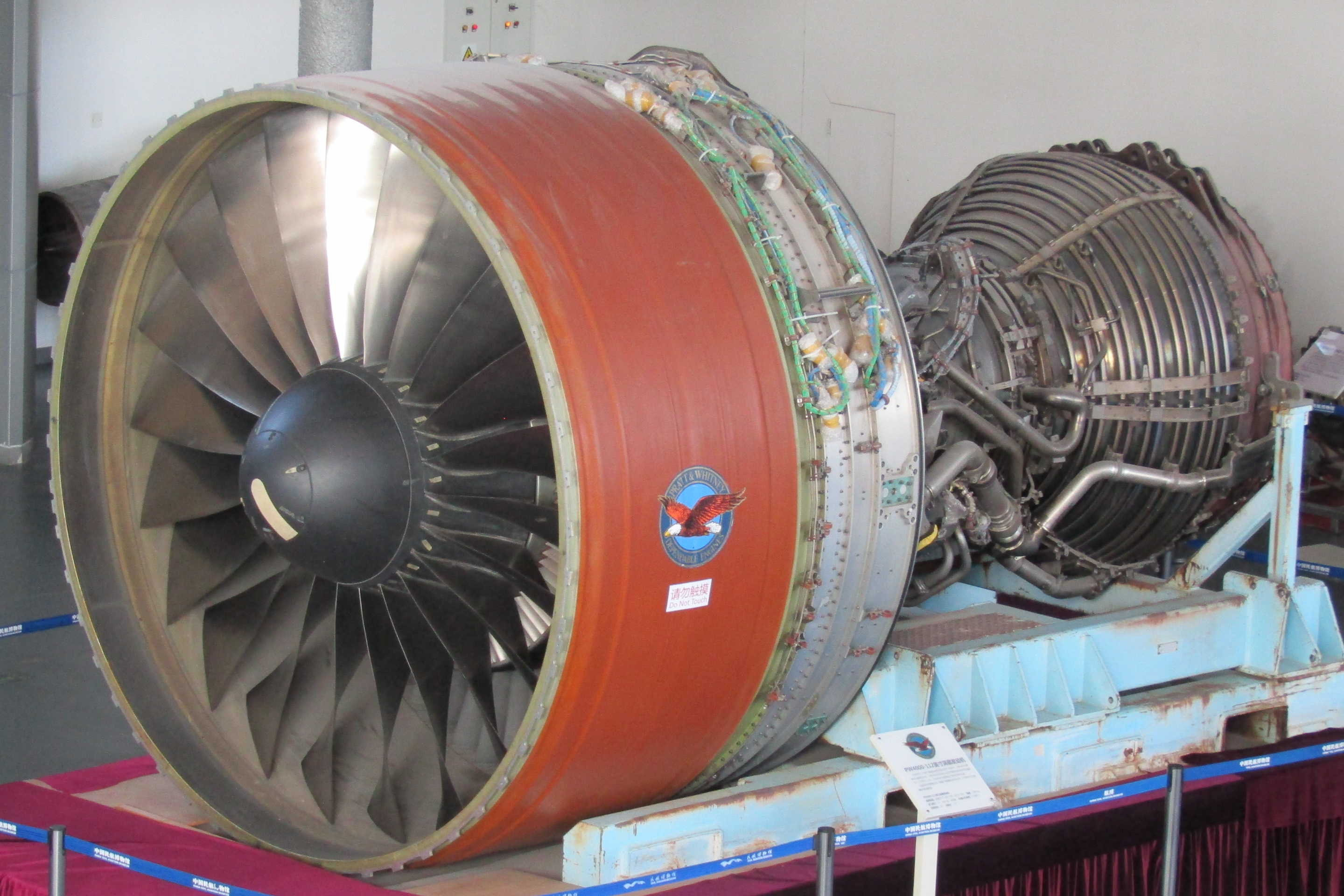
- The 112-inch (2.8 m) fan diameter PW4098 used on the Boeing 777
- Type: Turbofan
- National origin: United States
- Manufacturer: Pratt & Whitney
- First run: April 1984
- Major applications: Airbus A300-600/Airbus A310; Airbus A330; Boeing 747-400; Boeing 767/KC-46; Boeing 777; McDonnell Douglas MD-11; Scaled Composites Stratolaunch
- Manufactured: 1984–present
- Number built: 2,500 (June 2017)
- Developed from: Pratt & Whitney JT9D
- Developed into: Engine Alliance GP7000

The Pratt & Whitney PW4000 is a family of dual-spool, axial-flow, high-bypass turbofan aircraft engines produced by Pratt & Whitney as the successor to the JT9D. It was first run in April 1984, was FAA certified in July 1986, and was introduced in June 1987. With thrust ranging from 50,000 to 99,040 lbf (222 to 441 kN), it is used on many wide-body aircraft.

== Development ==
The 52,000–62,000 lbf (230–275 kN), 94 in (2.4 m) -fan PW4000 made its first run in April 1984, was FAA certified in July 1986, and was introduced in June 1987. It powers the Airbus A300-600 and Airbus A310-300, Boeing 747-400 and 767-200/300, Boeing 777-200/300, and McDonnell Douglas MD-11 widebodies.

Development of the 64,000–68,000 lbf (280–300 kN), 100 in (2.5 m)-fan version began in December 1991 for the Airbus A330, was FAA certified in August 1993, and made its first flight two months later. It received 90min Extended-range Twin-engine Operations (ETOPS) approval at introduction in December 1994, and 180min ETOPS approval in July 1995. In January 2000, it was the A330 market leader with more than half of the installed base and one million hours, more than twice that of each competitor. The Advantage 70 upgrade package for the PW4168A, which powered around one-third of the active Airbus A330 fleet, was launched at the 2006 Farnborough Airshow, increasing thrust to 70,000 lbf (311 kN), and reducing fuel burn by about 1.2% as well as overall operating costs by as much as 20%.

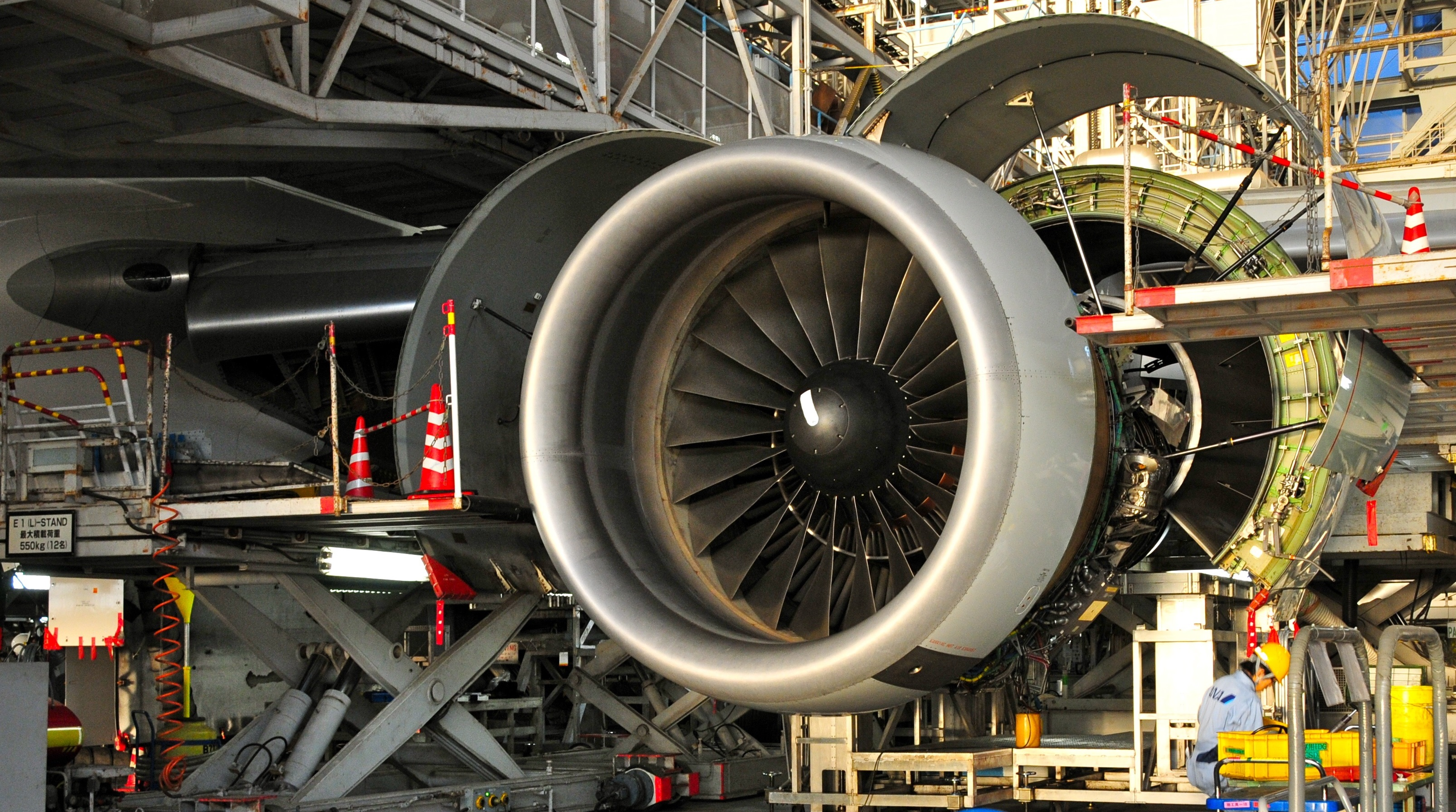
A PW4074 on an ANA 777-200 under maintenance with the fan doors open, showing the fan disk inside the inlet cowling at the front of the engine

For the Boeing 777, the 84,000–98,000 lbf (370–440 kN), 112 in (2.8 m)-fan version development began in October 1990, achieved 100,000 lbf (440 kN) in May 1993, and was approved for 180min ETOPS at service entry in June 1995.The 777 launch engine, it entered service on 7 June 1995, with United Airlines. The 90,000 lbf (400 kN) PW4090 entered service in March 1997. The 98,000 lbf (440 kN) PW4098 received FAA certification in July 1998 and was introduced on the Boeing 777-300 in September 1999 but was a few years later discontinued due to core temperature problems and fuel burn that was not appealing to airlines.

In 2000, over 2,000 PW4000 engines had accumulated over 40 million hours of service with 75 operators. In 30 years between June 1987 and 2017, more than 2,500 engines have been delivered, logging more than 135 million flight hours.

== Design ==
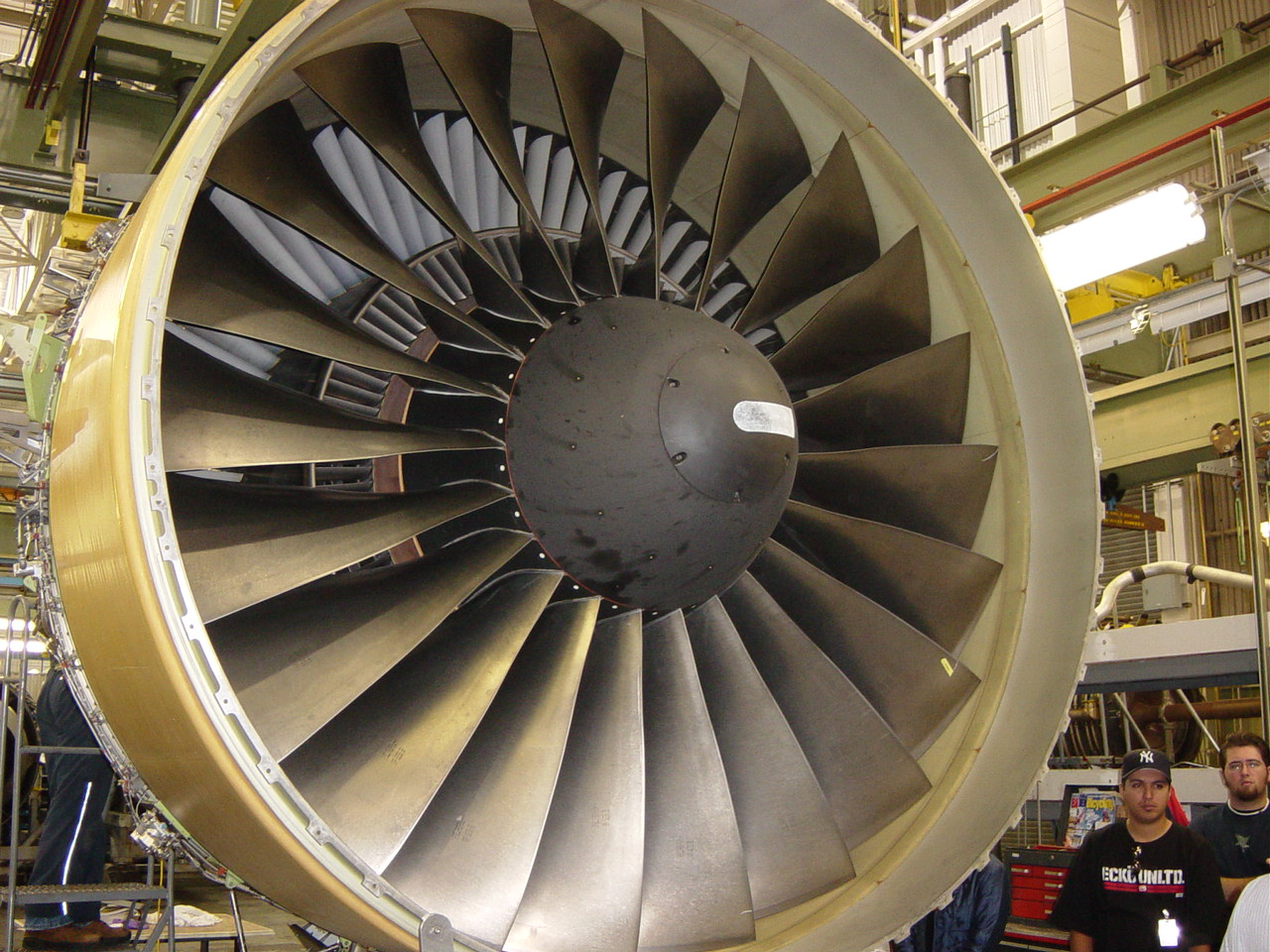
PW4077 titanium-bladed fan section with containment ring in the United Airlines maintenance facility at SFO

The PW4000 has a dispatch reliability rate of 99.96% and is approved for ETOPS 180. The average engine stays on wing 13,500 flight hours before a shop visit (a Shop Visit Rate of 0.073 per thousand hours). It is claimed to be cumulatively 3.4 dB quieter than other engines in its class.

Like other modern aircraft power plants, it has a Full Authority Digital Engine Control (FADEC), for better fuel economy and reliability. Furthermore, single-crystal alloys allows higher temperature capability and PW's Floatwall combustor liners improve durability and maintainability. Also, the Talon ("Technology for Affordable Low NOx") single-row combustor improves fuel-air mixing, for over 10% better NOx, CO, and HC emissions.

== Variants and applications ==
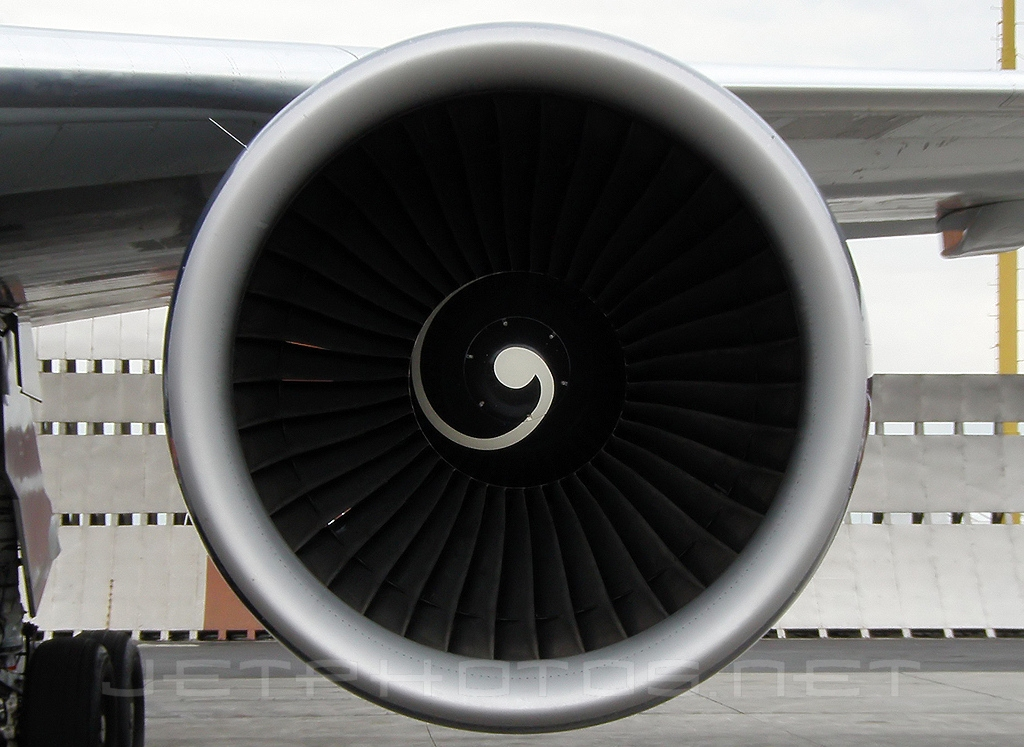
A -94 powering the Boeing 767 with 38 fan blades

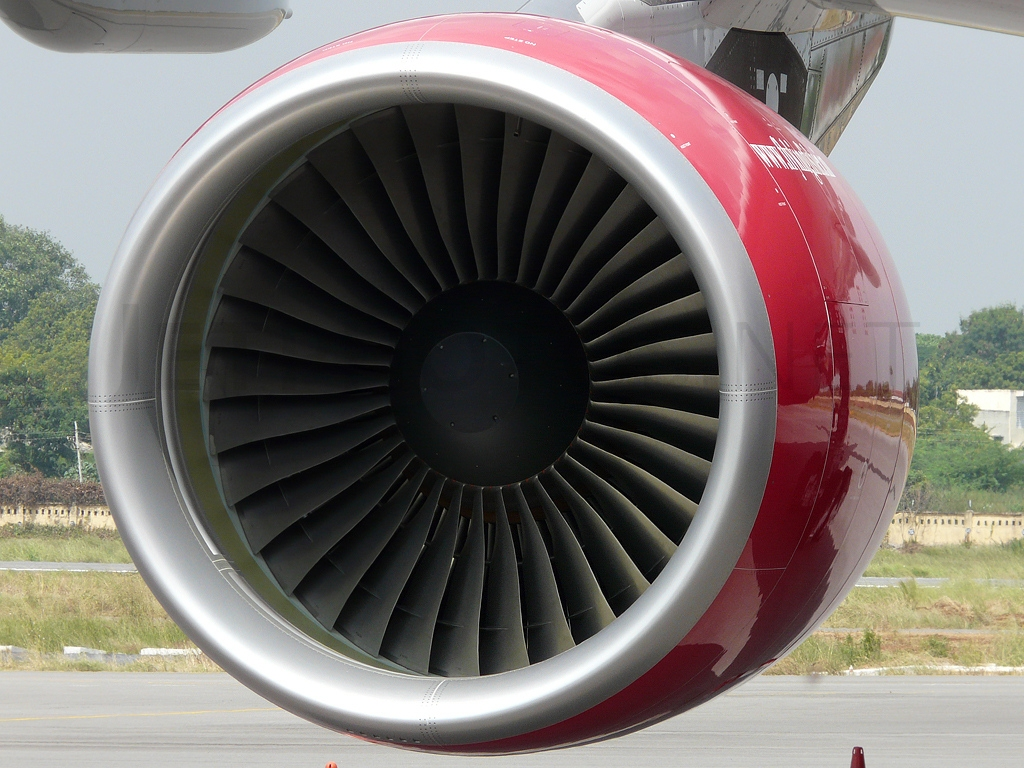
A -100 powering the Airbus A330 with 34 fan blades

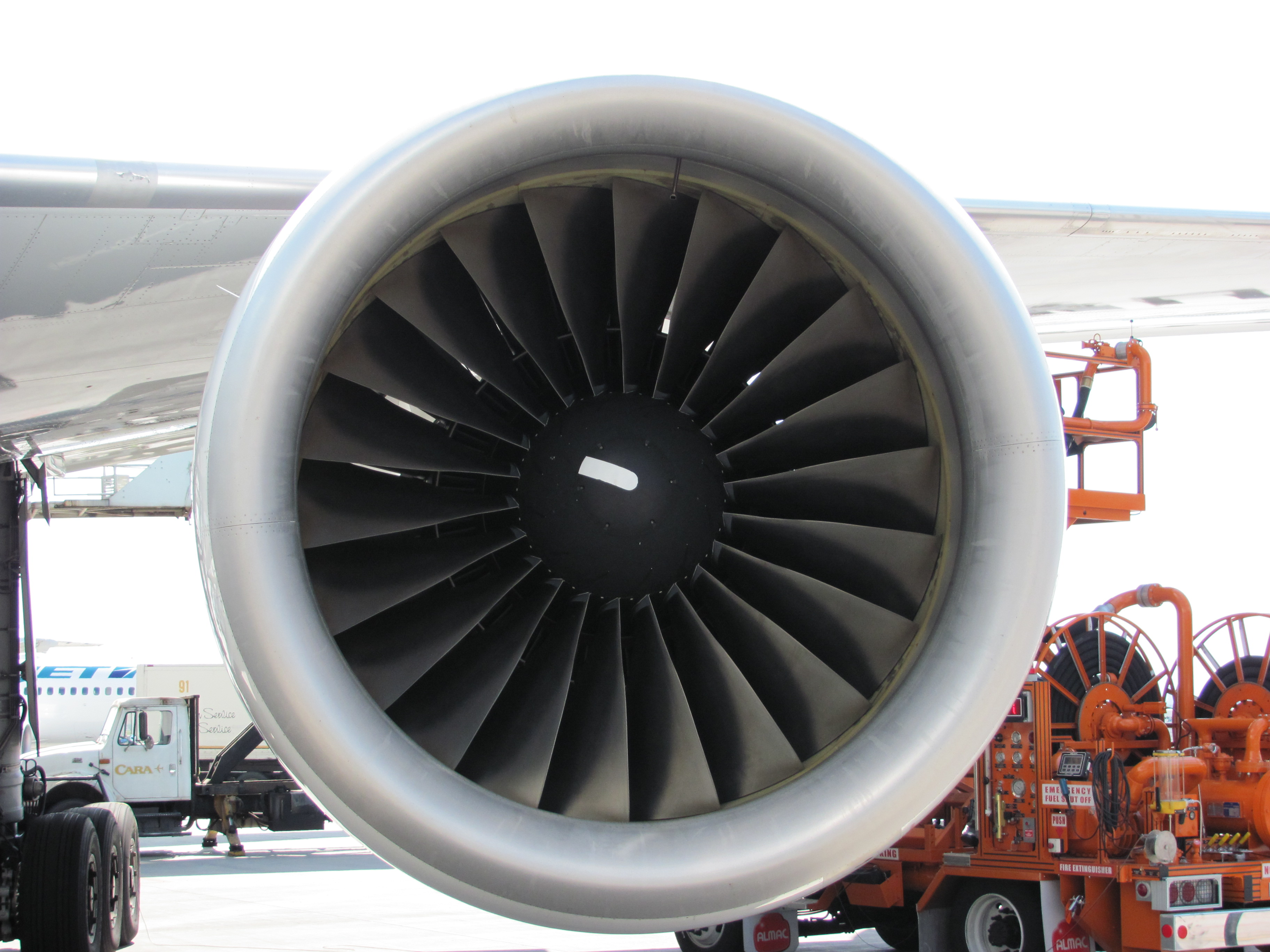
A -112 powering the Boeing 777 with 22 fan blades

The PW4000 series engine family uses a numbering systematic with the last three digits (PW 4XYZ) as identification of the application and thrust power:

- X describes the aircraft manufacturer for which the engine is approved. A "0" stands for Boeing; "1" for Airbus; and "4" for the McDonnell Douglas MD-11.
- YZ denotes the certified thrust in US pounds (lbf) in pro-mile fraction.

Example: A PW4090 identifies a PW4000 series engine certified for Boeing (777-200ER) and has a certified thrust of 90,000 lbf.

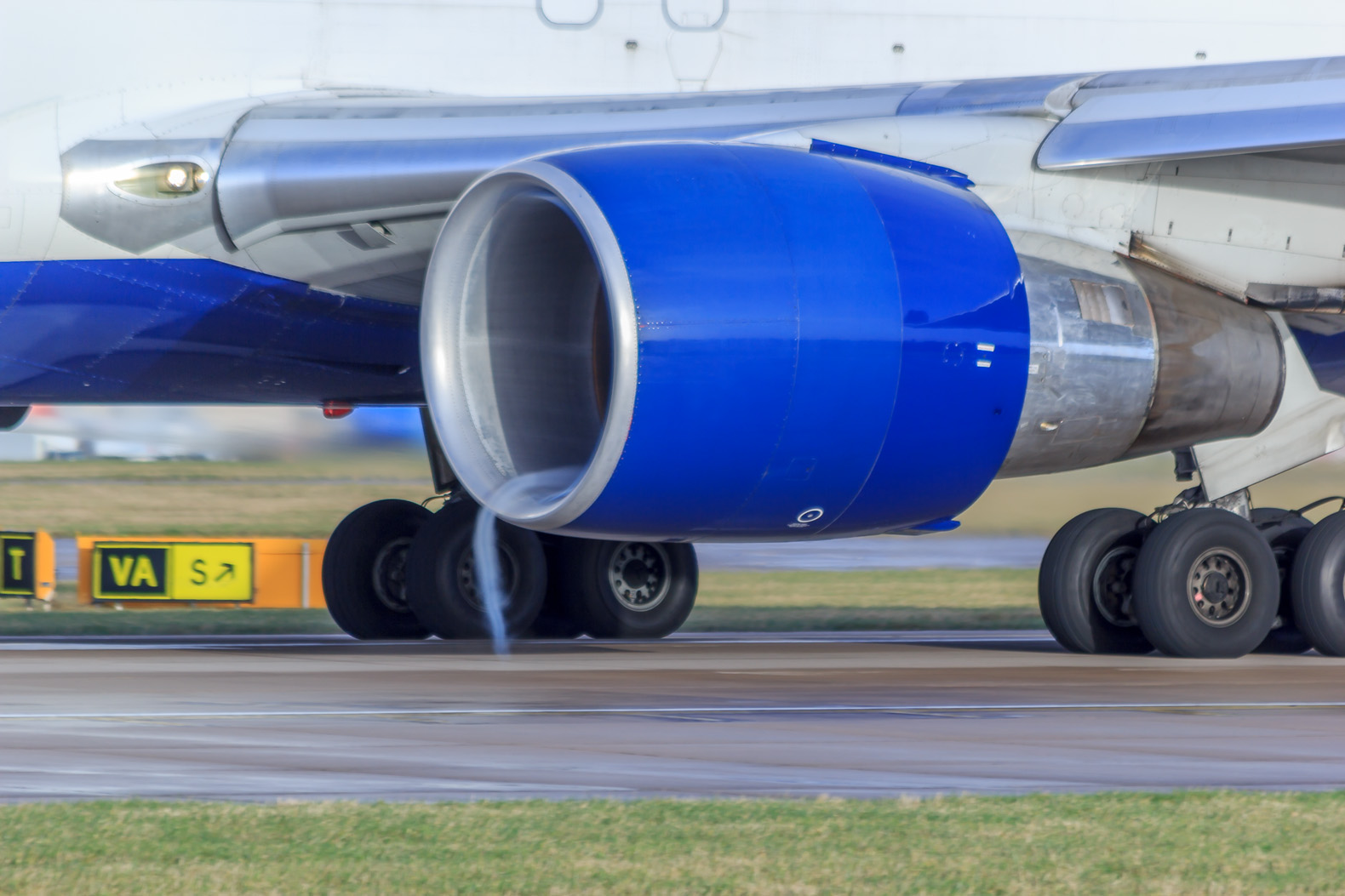
A PW4000-94 engine on Boeing 767-300ER

=== PW4000-94 ===
Variants: PW4052, PW4056, PW4060, PW4062, PW4062A, PW4152, PW4156A, PW4156, PW4158, PW4460 and PW4462.
Thrust range: 231–276 kN (52,000 lbf – 62,000 lbf)
Applications:

- Airbus A300-600R
- Airbus A310-300
- Boeing 747-400, Boeing Dreamlifter (and Scaled Composites Stratolaunch)
- Boeing 767-200/-300 (Including ER Version and Boeing Converted Freighter version except -300F), -400 (never entered service), -2C/Boeing KC-46A
- McDonnell Douglas MD-11

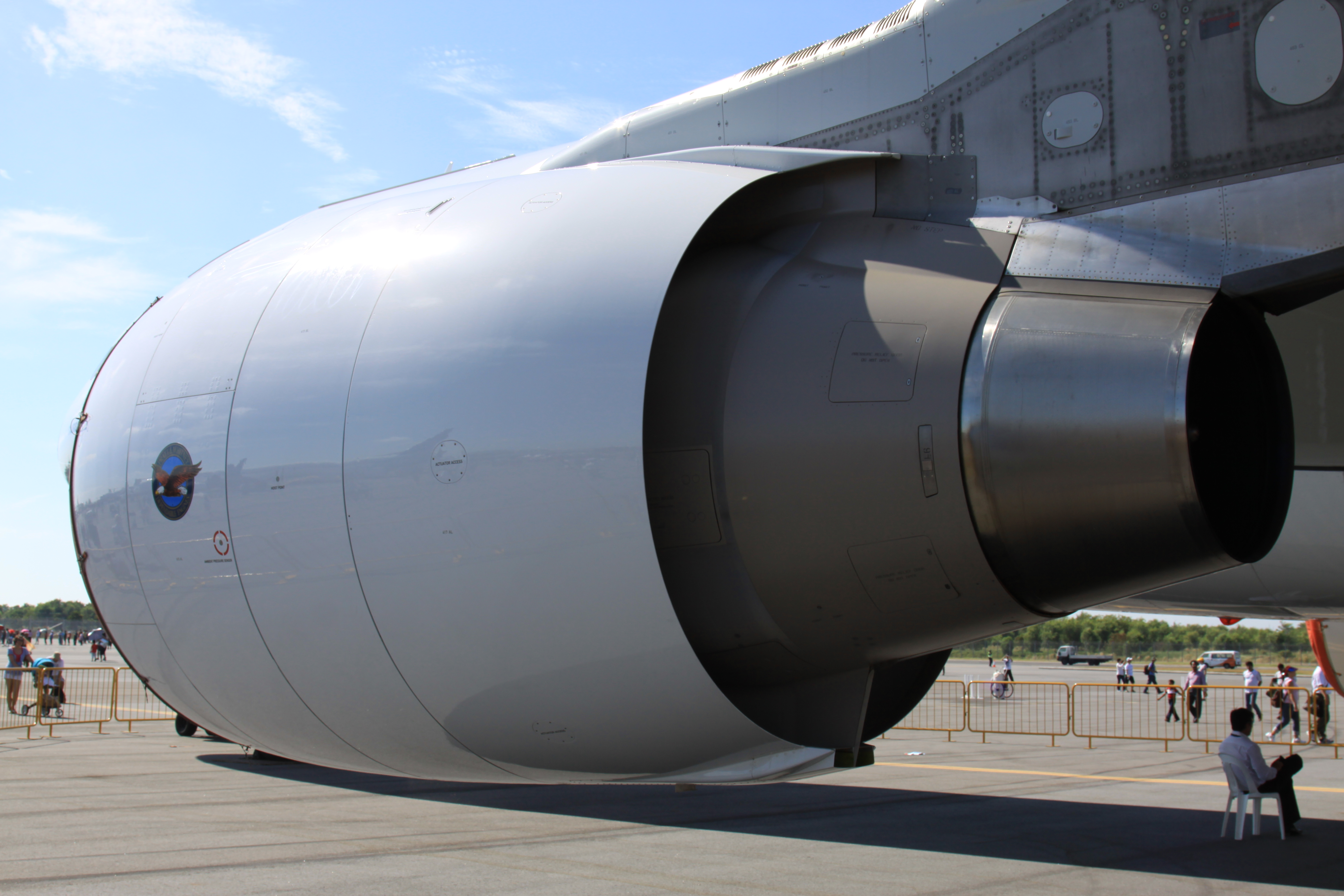
A PW4000-100 on Airbus A330-200

=== PW4000-100 ===
Variants: PW4164, PW4168, PW4168A and PW4170.
Thrust range: 287–311 kN (64,500 lbf – 70,000 lbf)
Applications: the engine variants are designed exclusively for Airbus A330-200 and -300 (the first generation A330 or A330ceo) (Note that this does not include the A330neo: -800 or -900, which are powered exclusively by Trent 7000, nor the BelugaXL: A330-700, which are powered exclusively by Trent 700).

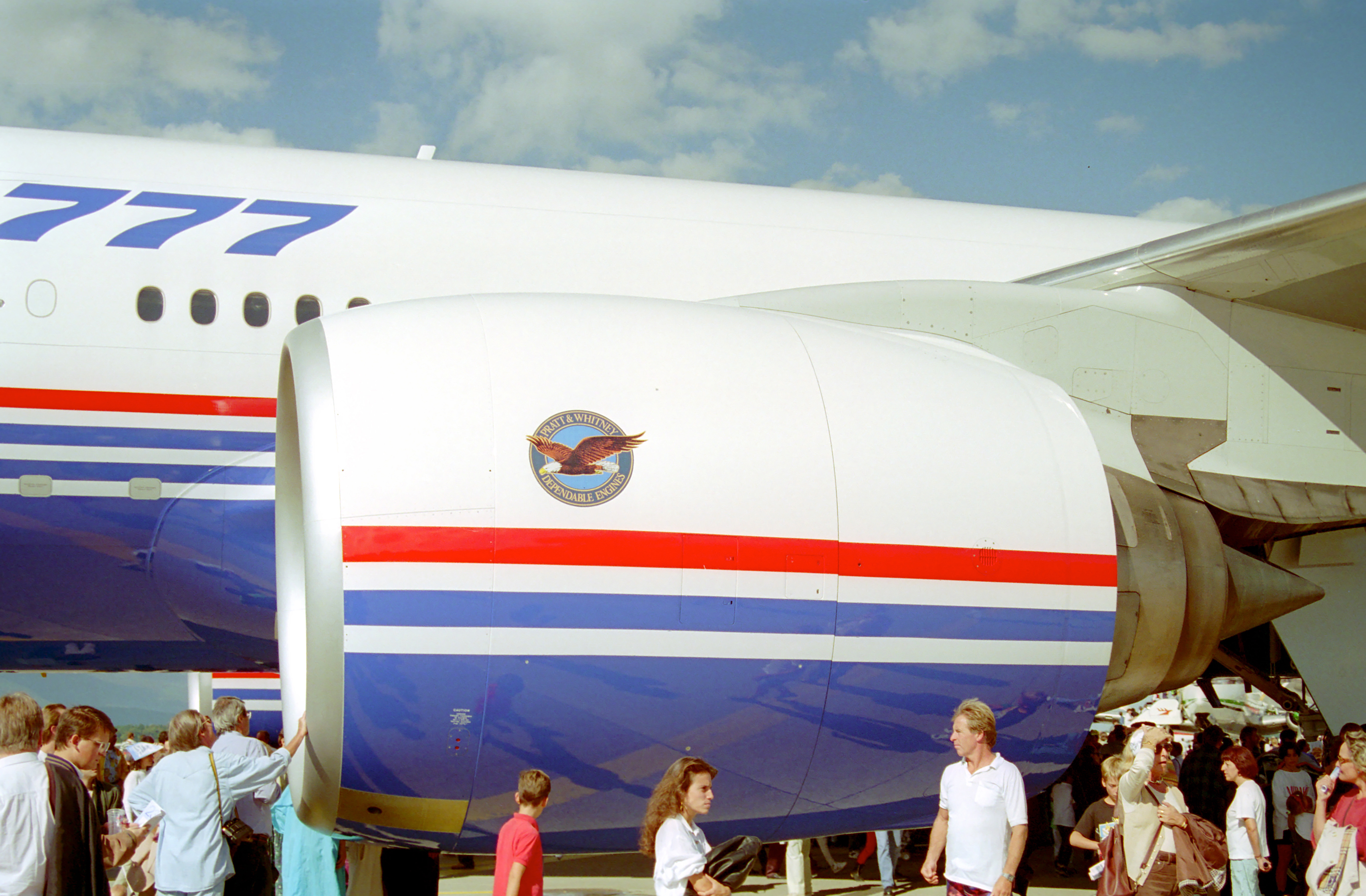
The PW4000-112 on the original Boeing 777-200; these were replaced with Rolls-Royce Trent 800 engines when it entered commercial service as B-HNL

=== PW4000-112 ===
Variants: PW4074/74D, PW4077/77D, PW4084/84D, PW4090 and PW4098.
Thrust range: 329–436 kN (74,000 lbf – 98,000 lbf)
Applications: the engine variants are designed exclusively for Boeing 777-200, -200ER, -300 (the first generation 777 or 777 Classics). (Note that this does not include the second generation 777: -200LR, -300ER or F which are powered exclusively by the GE90, nor the 777X: -8, -8F, or -9, which are powered exclusively by GE9X).

== Accidents and incidents ==
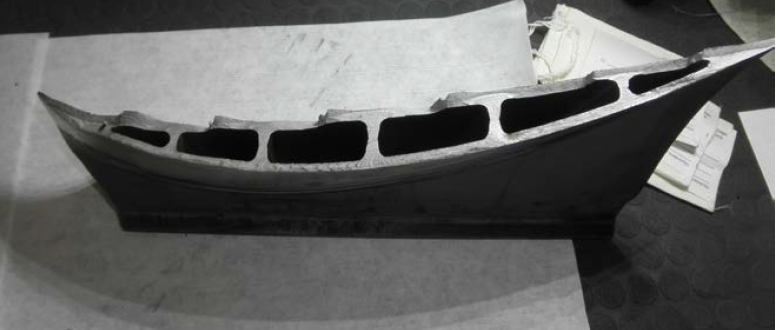
UAL1175 PW4077 fan blade root section fracture surface showing metal fatigue

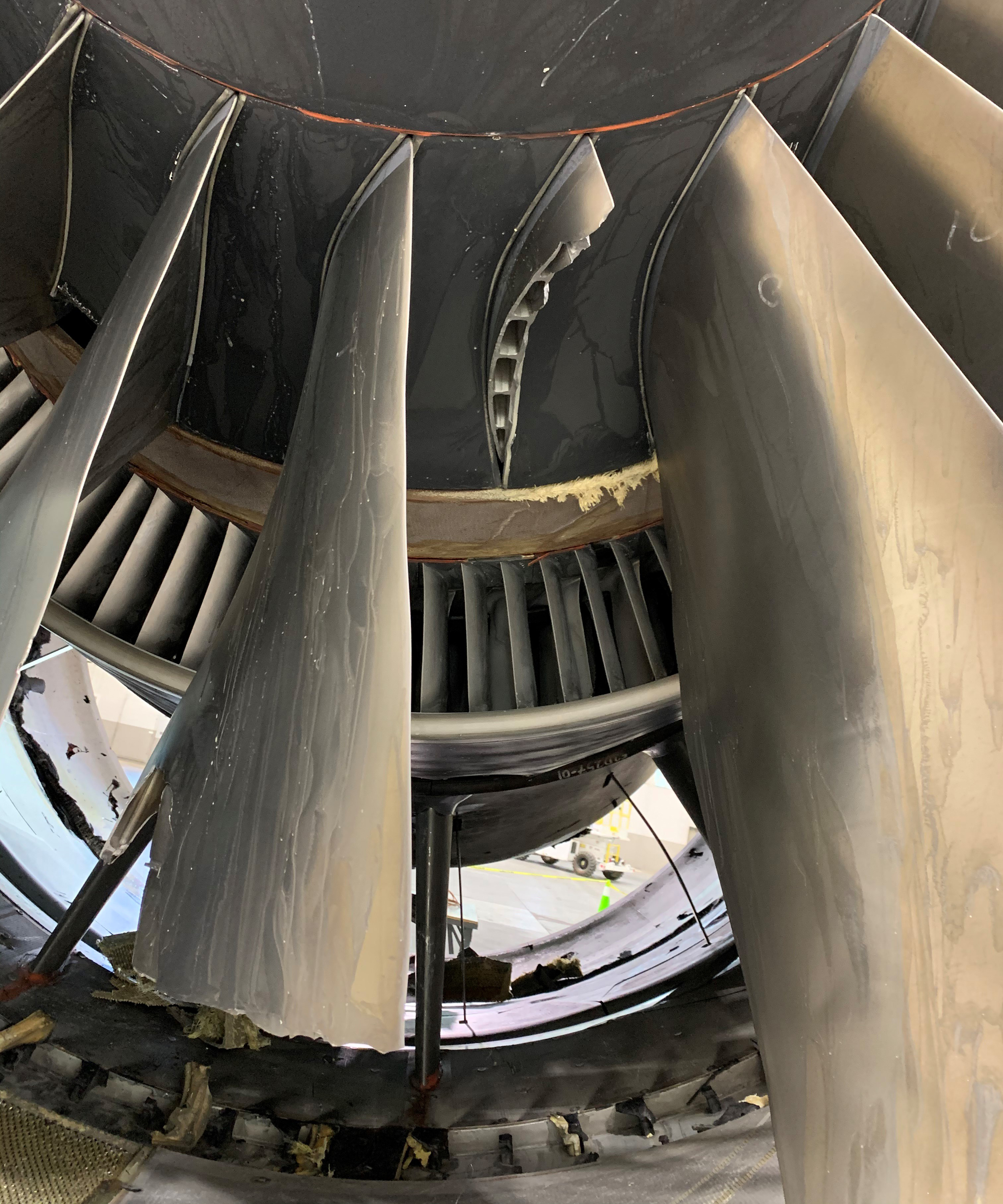
Damage to hollow fan blades from UA328, fracture surface near hub at top of photo

=== Involving PW4000-112 series ===
17 March 2003, United Airlines Flight 842
A PW4090 failed bearing caused the engine loss and the diversion to Kona, Hawaii, of a Boeing 777-200ER bound from Auckland, New Zealand, to Los Angeles. At 190 minutes this was the longest single-engine diversion on record at the time.

27 May 2016, Korean Air Flight 2708
A PW4090 uncontained turbine failure caused an aborted take-off, on a Boeing 777-300 at Tokyo-Haneda Airport.

13 February 2018, United Airlines Flight 1175
A PW4077 fan blade failure caused significant engine damage to a Boeing 777-200 on descent into Honolulu from San Francisco. Routine fan blade inspection in 2005 and 2010 had shown a crack in the blade's metal structure but insufficiently trained inspectors had confused it for a defect in the paint. In 2019, an airworthiness directive mandated recurring engine inspections based on usage cycles.

4 December 2020, Japan Airlines Flight 904
A PW4074 engine had a fan blade failure and associated engine cowl damage as the Boeing 777-200 was climbing out of Okinawa. Of the 22 fan blades on the left engine, one (blade number 16) fractured at the base and another (blade number 15) fractured in the middle. Evidence of fatigue failure was observed on the fracture surface of fan blade number 16. It is presumed that a crack originated from a nodule (a small granular mass attached to the base material) that was welded to the inner surface of the hollow structure during the polishing process of the fan blade manufacturing.

20 February 2021, United Airlines Flight 328
Boeing 777-200's right hand PW4077-112 had a blade failure shortly after taking off from Denver, causing significant engine damage. Two fan blades had broken off: one had suffered metal fatigue and possibly chipped another blade which also broke off. The failed blade was compliant with the inspection interval set by the FAA following the 2018 incident. The FAA grounded the affected 777s and issued an emergency Airworthiness Directive on 23 February, requiring a Thermal Acoustic Inspection (TAI) of the -112 fan blades before next flight. Japanese authorities and the UK's CAA followed suit, grounding 69 in-service and 59 in-storage Boeing 777s. Most carriers had voluntarily grounded the aircraft before, except South Korea's Jin Air's four aircraft. As of March 2021 the investigation is ongoing.

=== Involving PW4000-100 series ===
6 May 2014, Vietnam Airlines VN-A371
Uncontained failure of a PW4168A low-pressure turbine's stage four causing an Airbus A330 rejected take-off at Melbourne Airport in Australia.

13 February 2018, Delta Air Lines Flight 55
PW4168 fire in an Airbus A330-200 climbing from Lagos (Nigeria) at 2000 feet.

18 April 2018, Delta Air Lines Flight 30
Airbus A330-323's PW4168A fire after takeoff from Atlanta, investigated by the NTSB and the French BEA.

29 March 2026, Delta Air Lines Flight 104
Suspected failure of the low-pressure turbine shortly after take-off at São Paulo/Guarulhos International Airport in Brazil, investigation ongoing.

=== Involving PW4000-94 series ===
7 June 2017, Delta Air Lines flight 276
Metallic debris in a PW4056 tailpipe and a 360-degree crack in the LP turbine case just forward of the rear flange caused a Boeing 747-400 cruising at FL320 to return to Tokyo Narita. All of the HPC airfoils from the 5th to the 15th stage were damaged with nicks, dents, and tears to the leading and trailing edges and/or were broken off at various lengths above the blade root platforms. The HPT and LPT also had extensive damage, and the LPT case had a 360° split in line with the 6th stage turbine rotor. The NTSB reports 38 airfoil fractures of the 5th stage compressor blade before the part was updated.

20 February 2021, Longtail Aviation Flight 5504
Boeing 747-412BCF PW4056 failure shortly after taking off from Maastricht Aachen Airport : falling turbine blades slightly injured two persons on the ground, the airplane was able to land safely at Liège Airport.

28 March 2022, United Airlines Flight 134
Boeing 767 powered by Pratt & Whitney PW4060 engines experienced fan blade separation on the right-side (number 2) engine during a flight from New York to Zürich. The incident occurred over the Atlantic Ocean. The aircraft diverted to Shannon, Ireland, and landed safely with 123 persons on board.

== Specifications ==
The PW4000 is produced in three distinct models, with differing LP systems to address different thrust needs.

Variant	-94	-100	-112	
Type	Two spool high bypass ratio Turbofan			
Length	153.6 in (390 cm)	167.2 in (425 cm)	190.4 in (484 cm)	
Weight	9,420 lb 4,273 kg	12,900 lb 5,851 kg	15,095–15,741 lb 6,847–7,140 kg	16,260 lb 7,375 kg
Compressor	1 fan, 4 LP, 11 HP	1 fan, 5 LP, 11 HP	1 fan, 6 LP, 11 HP	1 fan, 7 LP, 11 HP
Combustor	Annular			
Turbine	2 HP, 4 LP	2 HP, 5 LP	2 HP, 7 LP	
Thrust	50,000–62,000 lbf 222–276 kN	64,500–70,000 lbf 287–311 kN	77,440–91,790 lbf 344–408 kN	91,790–99,040 lbf 408–441 kN
Variant	-94	-100	-112	
Fan	94 in (239 cm)	100 in (254 cm)	112 in (284 cm)	
Bypass ratio	4.8–5:1	4.9:1	5.8–6.4:1	
Overall pressure ratio	27.5–32.3	32.0–34.1	34.2–42.8	
Fan pressure ratio	1.65–1.80	1.75–1.76	1.70–1.80	
Applications	B747-400, B767, MD-11; A300-600, A310	A330	B777	

== See also ==
Related development

- Engine Alliance GP7000

Comparable engines

- Aviadvigatel PS-90
- General Electric CF6
- General Electric GE90
- Pratt & Whitney PW2000
- Progress D-18T
- Rolls-Royce RB211
- Rolls-Royce Trent 700
- Rolls-Royce Trent 800

Related lists

- List of aircraft engines
