= Broomfield County Commons Park =

Park and recreational complex in Colorado, USA

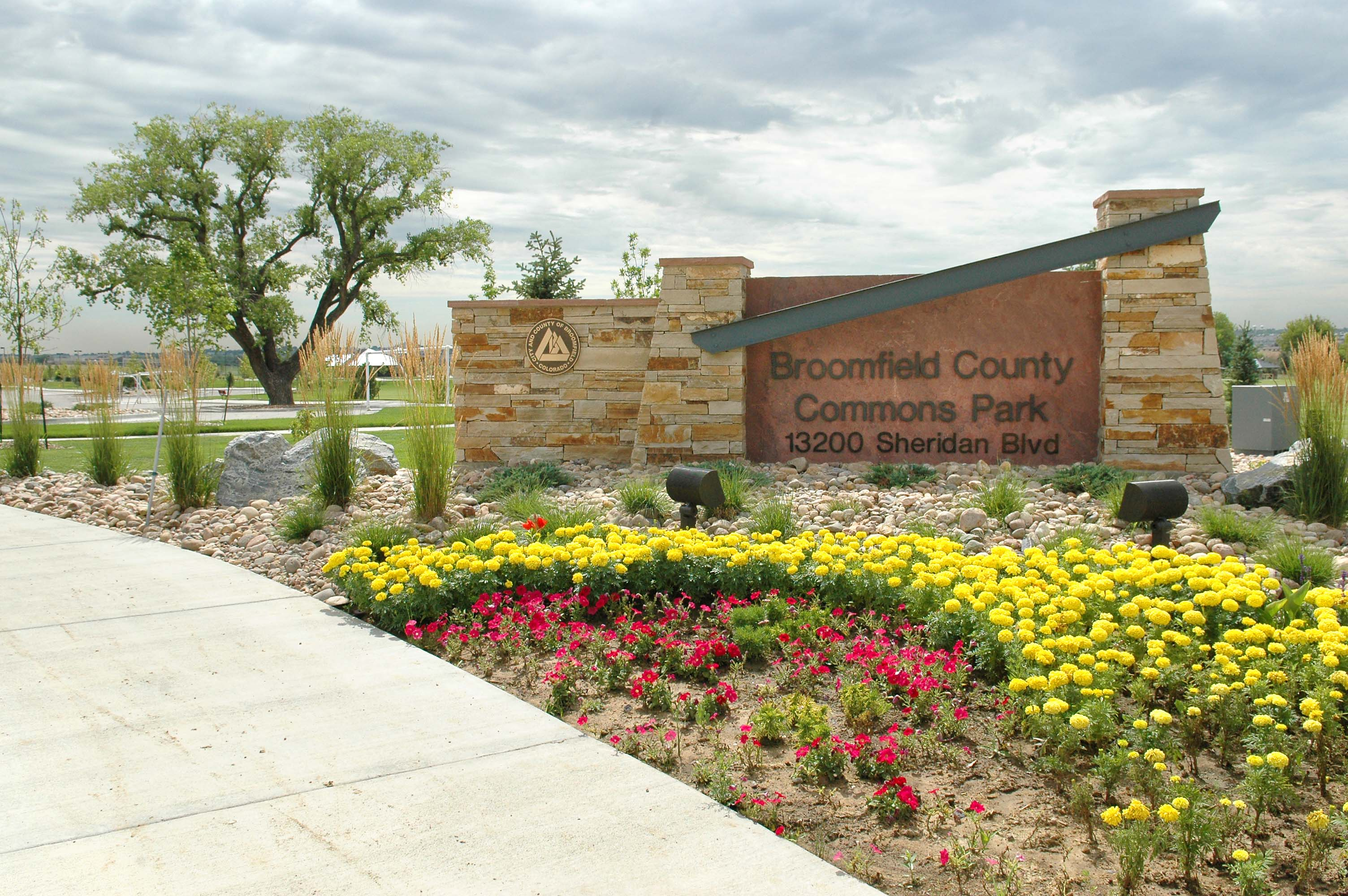
- Broomfield County Commons Park Sign

- Location within Colorado Location within the United States
- Interactive map of Broomfield County Commons Park
- Type: Municipal
- Location: Broomfield County, Colorado
- Coordinates: 39.9289°N 105.0527°W
- Area: 300-acre (1.2 km^{2})

Broomfield County Commons Park, a 300-acre (1.2 km^{2}) county park in Broomfield County, Colorado, in the United States, is home to the Paul Derda Recreation Center, County Commons cemetery, 237 acres (0.96 km^{2}) of open space, and the 80-acre (0.32 km^{2}) park and sports complex.

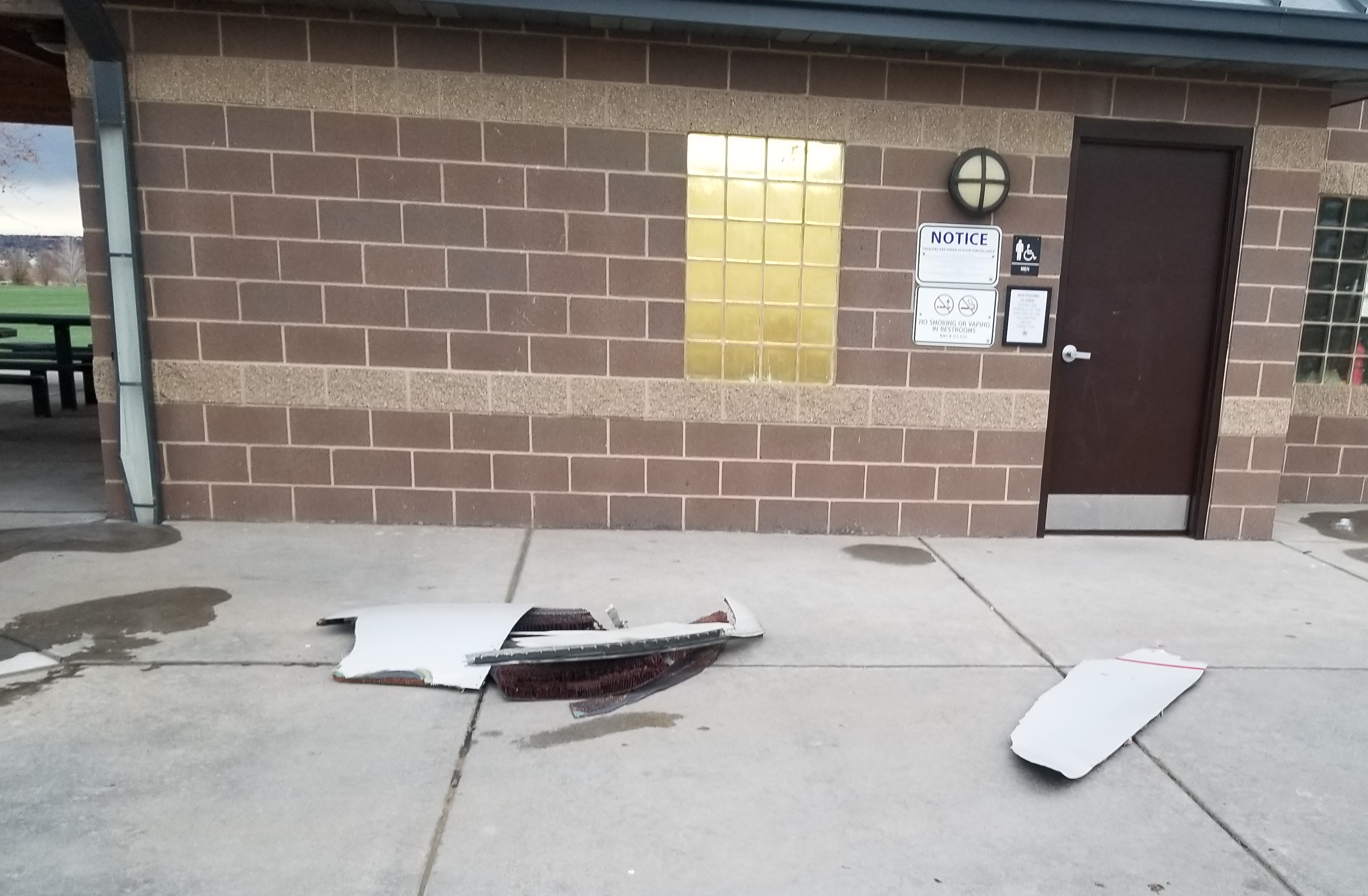
Engine nacelle fragments from United Airlines Flight 328 found in front of Broomfield County Commons Park restroom.

On February 20, 2021, United Airlines Flight 328 departed from the nearby Denver International Airport en route to Honolulu, Hawaii. The Boeing 777 aircraft suffered an engine failure four minutes after takeoff that resulted in a debris field at least 1 mile (1.6 km) long that included Commons Park and the surrounding residential area. Parts Departing Aircraft from the affected engine cowling were found in the park. The aircraft returned to Denver International Airport and landed with no reported injuries to passengers or persons on the ground.
