= Blade off testing =

Test of jet engine durability against broken blades

Blade containment and rotor unbalance
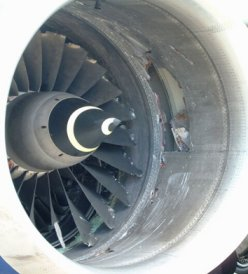
- Damaged engine case from blade-out testing. Credit: NASA
- Purpose: Ensures that failure of rotating fan and compressor blades in turbine engines does not cause consequential failures in critical aircraft systems
- Year started: 1964

Blade off testing or blade out testing is a specific form of air safety testing required by the Federal Aviation Administration and other safety agencies to certify safety performance of jet engines. The tests require engine manufacturers to carry out at least two tests of the engine, to make sure that the engine can survive a compressor or fan blade breaking off within the engine and a turbine blade breaking off within the engine, without fragments being thrown through the outside enclosure of the engine, creating a contained engine failure.

In the United States, the tests are required by Title 14, Part 33 Subpart F, Section 33.94 of the US Code of Federal Regulations (CFR), Blade containment and rotor unbalance tests. Equivalent test requirements are provided in the Certification Specifications for Engines (CS-E), published by the European Aviation Safety Agency (EASA).

== Design ==
One of the most challenging component design and certification requirements for commercial jet engines is to mitigate the effects of a "blade-out" rotor failure event, which can result in catastrophic loss of aircraft and/or passengers. Engine blade-out occurs when a sudden change in speed causes a fluctuation in rotor spin and resulting blade overstress condition, or when a blade, or group of blades, fails due to fatigue from repeated cyclic stresses. Testing rotor dynamics and blade-out conditions to ensure safe operation is extremely expensive, time consuming and labor intensive. The testing usually requires a specially prepared compressor or turbine blade with an embedded small explosive charge, to separate it on command during the test.

The tests and standard do not require that the engines continue to operate after the blade failures, only that no fragments penetrate the engine outer casing and that it does not vibrate badly enough during its shutdown that it will tear loose from the aircraft, barring other failures. The Society of Automotive Engineers have prepared reports detailing the number of blade-out failures.

There are two approaches to contain debris following a blade-out event: either a hard-wall, which is designed to withstand and deflect shrapnel, or a soft-wall, which is designed to arrest and retain shrapnel. The hard-wall is an older approach dating from the 1970s and tends to be heavier than the soft-wall because it is generally a heavy metal ring; the soft wall generally uses a resilient outer containment layer made from a composite material such as aramid fiber, which requires a larger space to allow the composite layer to expand slightly. In addition, a hard wall to retain solid metal blades generally requires a prohibitively heavy ring, so hard walls are usually used with hollow metal or composite blades.

A typical hard steel containment ring varied in thickness up to 3/8 inch (9.5 mm) at a weight of 410 pounds (190 kg); A "stratified containment structure" with a low resistance layer to trap the debris, surrounded by a high resistance layer to maintain the containment shape and minimize further interaction with the remaining turbine blades, was proposed in a 1979 NASA study. A compressed air gun was used to fire blade projectiles into several different containment designs to test "stratified" concept designs incorporating composite materials.

A 1976 study included an evaluation of the armor required to contain the energy from 1 blade, 2 blade, and 4 blade fragments of the compressor and turbine stages of General Electric CF6 and Pratt & Whitney JT9D engines; although the 4 blade fragment was unlikely to occur, containing it would have required a steel plate 1.212 inches (30.8 mm) thick, adding 110 to 195 pounds (50 to 88 kg) per engine. The study concluded that redundant armor could be added to the airframe in addition to engine-mounted containment, but at a substantial weight penalty of 2,500 or 3,000 pounds (1,100 or 1,400 kg) for 3 or 4 engine aircraft, respectively. A companion study for engine-mounted armor concluded the weight of a containment to resist a 4 blade fragment would have to increase by approximately 410 pounds (190 kg) in addition to the 510 pounds (230 kg) of containment material already provided, most of which would be required for the fan section.

== History ==
=== United States ===
The original issue of the Airworthiness Standards for Aircraft Engines (14 CFR 33) on June 10, 1964 included a durability requirement in Part 33.19 to ensure "the design of the compressor and turbine rotor cases must provide for the containment of damage from rotor failure." A series of superseding advisory circulars (ACs) were issued in 1965, 1968, and 1970 to provide guidance to demonstrate compliance to the requirements of the Airworthiness Standards. The 1965 guidance in AC 33-1 noted the favorability of "puncture resistant rotor housings or separate armor adequate to contain broken rotor blades and stator vanes" and engine rotor and bearings strong enough "to provide a strength margin for a period of shutdown and low speed windmilling when large unbalances typical of damaged rotor blading occur," but was more concerned with the mitigation of damage following foreign object ingestion. By 1970, AC 33-1B provided more concrete acceptance criteria for the containment, which should be able to prevent "significant rupture or hazardous distortion of the engine casing and the expulsion of blades through or beyond the edge of the engine case or shield."

Amendment 10 to the Airworthiness Standards was published by the Federal Aviation Administration on February 23, 1984, which modified the durability requirement of 33.19 by adding that "energy levels and trajectories of fragments resulting from rotor blade failure that lie outside the compressor and turbine rotor cases must be defined" and by moving some requirements for blade off testing from the advisory circulars to a new regulation (14 CFR 33.94).

The containment requirement and testing requirement were imposed after review of the history of uncontained engine failures which caused serious damage to aircraft, consequent to the July 19, 1989 United Airlines Flight 232 (UA232) accident. That accident did not originate from a fan blade off but from a defect in the fan rotor disk on the Number 2 (tail) General Electric CF6 engine, resulting in a loss of hydraulic power to the flight control actuators and crash landing of that aircraft. One of the recommendations in the resulting National Transportation Safety Board investigation report was to amend 14 CFR 33 to require an evaluation of engine components; the evaluation would determine which components, if they should fracture and separate, could pose a significant threat to aircraft structures and systems. After the UA232 accident, the FAA issued AC 33-5 on June 18, 1990.

The UA232 accident also led to new Airworthiness Standards safety analysis requirements, defining "non-containment of high energy debris" as a hazardous engine effect in Part 33.75, which was added by Amendment 24 on September 4, 2007; Amendment 24 also reconciled the United States standards with contemporary European standards. AC 33-1B was canceled in 2015 after being superseded by newer regulations and ACs.

=== Europe ===
The equivalent blade off test requirements were specified in Compressor and Turbine Blade Failure: Subpart E, Section 810 of the Joint Aviation Requirements for Engines (JAR-E), developed and issued by the Joint Aviation Authorities. JAR-E was superseded by the identically-structured Certification Specifications for Engines (CS-E), initially endorsed and issued by the European Aviation Safety Agency on October 24, 2003; the same Subpart E and Section 810 of CS-E apply for blade off testing. Amendment 6 of CS-E 810 states that for a turbine engine to be certified, "it must be demonstrated that any single compressor or turbine blade will be contained after Failure and that no Hazardous Engine Effect can arise as a result of other Engine damage likely to occur before Engine shut down following a blade Failure."

== See also ==
- Birdstrike simulator
