= Overseas National Airways Flight 032 =

1975 aviation accident in New York

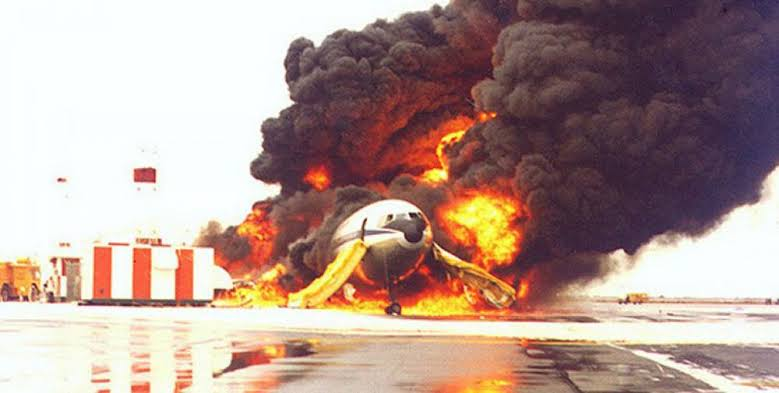
- The aircraft on fire following the bird strike

Accident
- Date: November 12, 1975
- Summary: Destroyed by fire following uncontained engine failure during takeoff roll cause by bird strike
- Site: John F. Kennedy International Airport, New York, United States; 40°38′N 73°46′W

Aircraft
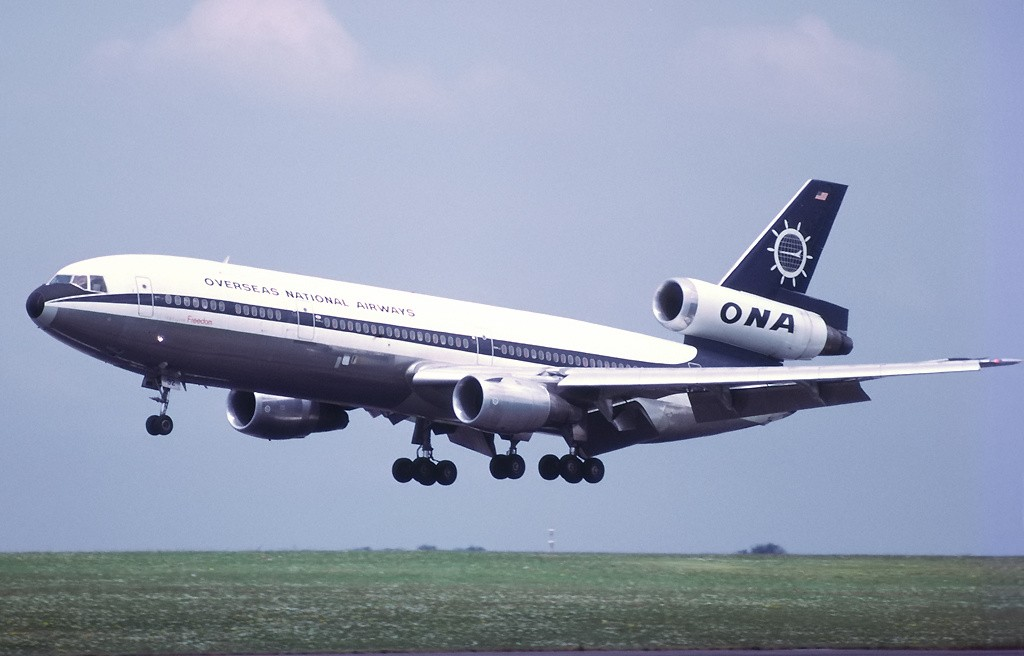
- N1032F, the aircraft involved in the accident, seen in 1974
- Aircraft type: McDonnell Douglas DC-10-30CF
- Aircraft name: HolidayLiner Freedom
- Operator: Overseas National Airways
- IATA flight No.: OV032
- ICAO flight No.: ONA032
- Call sign: LIBERTY 032
- Registration: N1032F
- Flight origin: John F. Kennedy International Airport, New York, United States
- Stopover: Frankfurt International Airport, Frankfurt, West Germany (now Germany)
- Destination: King Abdulaziz International Airport, Jeddah, Saudi Arabia
- Occupants: 139
- Passengers: 129
- Crew: 10
- Fatalities: 0
- Injuries: 32
- Survivors: 139

Overseas National Airways Flight 032 was a non-scheduled positioning flight operated by Overseas National Airways with a McDonnell Douglas DC-10-30CF. On November 12, 1975, the flight crew initiated a rejected takeoff after accelerating through a large flock of gulls at John F. Kennedy International Airport, resulting in a runway excursion. Of the 139 aircraft occupants, all survived, while the aircraft was destroyed by an intense post-crash fire. The National Transportation Safety Board (NTSB) concluded that the probable cause of the accident was bird ingestion into the right-hand engine, causing an uncontained engine failure that ruptured several landing gear tires and disabled the engine's hydraulic system, in turn partially disabling the spoilers and the landing gear brakes. Contributing to the accident was the resultant failure of the affected engine's thrust reverser and the wet runway. General Electric Aircraft Engines, makers of the DC-10's CF6 engines, partially dissented from the NTSB's conclusions, stating that the engine failure was caused by ingestion of debris from a main landing gear wheel and tire failure prior to the collision with the gulls. The accident aircraft is claimed to be the largest commercial airliner ever destroyed due to a bird strike.

== Aircraft and crew ==
=== Aircraft ===
The aircraft was a 2-year-old McDonnell Douglas DC-10-30CF registered as N1032F and named "HolidayLiner Freedom" by Overseas National Airways (ONA), its only operator. It was powered by three General Electric CF6-50A high-bypass turbofan engines.

McDonnell Douglas built five DC-10-30CFs for ONA, one of which was sold to another operator before delivery. The other four aircraft were all destroyed in accidents, two (which occurred less than two months apart) while operating for ONA, the other two after the aircraft passed to other operators. Only one accident involved loss of life.

=== Crew ===
The crew consisted of Captain Harry R. Davis, aged 55, employed by ONA since 1951, who had qualified to fly the DC-10 in 1973 and accumulated 25,000 flight hours in his career with 2,000 hours on the DC-10; First Officer Raymond A. Carrier, aged 52, employed by ONA since 1968, with 14,500 flight hours of which 450 hours were on the DC-10; and Flight Engineer Jack A. Holland, aged 44, employed by ONA since May 19, 1959, with 12,000 flight hours of which 2,000 flight hours were on the DC-10. In addition to the flight crew, a non-flying ONA observer occupied the jump seat in the cockpit.

== Flight ==
Onboard the flight were 129 passengers and ten crew members, all of whom were ONA employees (including maintenance crew, flight attendants, ground personnel, etc.) bound for Mecca to operate air charter flights. Prior to departure, the aircraft had been loaded to 555,000 pounds (252,000 kg)—1,000 pounds (450 kg) less than its maximum takeoff weight—and was carrying an estimated 235,000 pounds (107,000 kg) of jet fuel at the time of the accident. Meteorological information indicated that visibility was 15 miles (24 km), wind was blowing at heading 160° at 8 knots (9.2 mph; 15 km/h), with an overcast ceiling of 10,000 feet (3,000 m). The captain requested Runway 13R, one of the newest runways at John F. Kennedy International Airport, due to the aircraft's heavy weight. Flight 032 entered Runway 13R and started its takeoff roll.

=== Accident ===
As the DC-10 was accelerating on the ground at around 100 knots (120 mph; 190 km/h), a large flock of gulls rose from the runway and clustered directly in front of the aircraft. As the aircraft passed through the flock, the flight crew heard three loud explosions or bangs. The captain immediately initiated a rejected takeoff, brought the thrust levers to the idle position, and deployed the thrust reversers. The master caution lights illuminated and the flight engineer exclaimed that they had "lost" the #3 engine (the engine on the right wing) as it went into reverse thrust. The flight engineer then noticed that pressure in the #2 hydraulic system, which is powered by the #3 engine, had dropped to zero. The master fire warning lights and the fire warning light for the #3 engine illuminated, and the first officer and flight engineer attempted to shut the engine down, but found that the fuel shutoff lever would not move. The flight engineer then actuated the fire extinguishers for the engine but did not see the light that indicated the extinguishers had discharged. Around this time, the pilots realized that the aircraft was not decelerating normally but believed that directional control could be maintained, so they initiated a slight left-hand turn towards Taxiway Z to avoid plowing into a blast fence past the departure end of the runway. However, the aircraft left the runway pavement before reaching the taxiway, and began to shudder violently. As the aircraft came to rest on Taxiway Z, the captain pulled the fuel shutoff levers and fire handles for the other two engines, but was unable to order an emergency evacuation because the public address microphone had become displaced. The first officer opened a cockpit window and saw that the right wing was ablaze, and a cabin crew member opened the cockpit door, revealing that the cabin was filling with black smoke.

=== Evacuation and wreckage ===
The flight crew initiated an evacuation through the cockpit windows using escape ropes and the cabin crew began evacuating the cabin using the evacuation slides. All 129 passengers and 10 crew members were able to evacuate, with 27 passengers suffering minor injuries and six crew members suffering minor or serious injuries, all sustained during the emergency evacuation. Although airport firefighters arrived almost immediately and began fighting the fire, HolidayLiner Freedom came to rest near an underground storm drain which collected burning fuel as it drained, rendering the blaze extremely difficult to extinguish. Most of the fire remained confined to the crash area, but pieces of the #3 engine struck a Pan Am tire shop near Runway 13R, damaging a tractor and causing several fuel drums to burn.

The aircraft's left and centerline main landing gear separated from the airframe while the right main landing gear collapsed. Wreckage was scattered over an area of 8,460 feet (2,580 m) long and 1,086 feet (331 m) wide. Pieces of the #3 engine were scattered across the runway while the other two engines remained attached to the airframe.

== Investigation ==
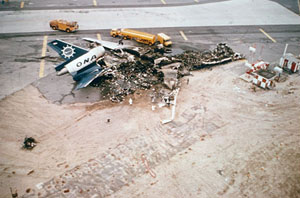
N1032F, after the accident

=== National Transportation Safety Board ===
After an in-depth investigation for 1 year and 1 month, the National Transportation Safety Board released its final report on December 16, 1976. The Cockpit Voice Recorder (CVR) was deemed unusable due to its recording tape having been destroyed by the massive fire that erupted and the Flight Data Recorder (FDR) inadvertently stopped while Flight 032 was accelerating to 168 knots. The NTSB highlighted that the crew performed "exceptionally well" and the fire did not penetrate far into the cabin or into the cockpit before everyone evacuated.

Conclusions were as follows:

- The No. 3 hydraulic system was inoperative, which in turn caused the loss of the No. 2 brake system, and braking torque fell to zero
- The No. 3 engine thrust reverser was rendered inoperative
- At least three tires disintegrated
- The No. 3 system spoiler panels on each wing could not deploy
- The runway surface was wet

Recommendations were as follows:

- The bird-control program at John F. Kennedy Airport did not effectively control the bird hazard at the airport
- The Federal Aviation Administration and the General Electric Company failed to consider the effects of rotor imbalance on the abradable epoxy shroud material when the engine was tested for certification.

=== General Electric ===
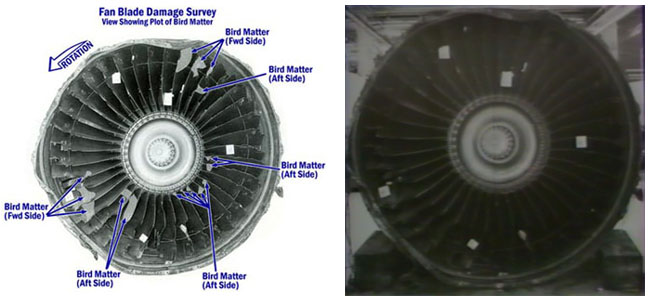
The damage suffered by the fan blades of Engine #3

An investigation was carried out on the #3 engine by General Electric Aircraft Engines (GEAE) in Ohio. Disassembly revealed that several engine fan blades were damaged and broken, causing blades to abrade the epoxy fan shroud; as the epoxy combusted, it ignited jet fuel leaking from a broken fuel line. However, GEAE denied that the ingested birds were the underlying cause of the damage. Company investigators speculated that a tire or landing gear failure had occurred prior to the bird strikes, and that tire, wheel or landing gear debris ingested into the engine caused the fan blade damage and cut the fuel line. To demonstrate that the General Electric CF6 engine was capable of withstanding a bird strike, the National Transportation Safety Board conducted a test with a sample engine. The test caused no severe damage to any engine parts. Modifications to the test engine, such as increasing the distance between each fan blade, gave similar results. However, several changes could have been made to improve the effectiveness of the bird strike hazard.

== Aftermath ==
=== Precaution against birds at JFK ===
It was reported that 11 other severe bird strike incidents occurred at John F. Kennedy between July and November 1975. After the accident, a recommendation was given to the staff services to provide adequate bird strike protection. Following this recommendation, between 6:00 A.M. and 10 A.M. and 2:00 P.M. onwards, a crew of seven staff members was to patrol birds with sound detectors and the authority to shoot birds if there was to be an imminent collision with an aircraft. The FAA mentioned that JFK bird hazard measures were taken on a "piecemeal" basis and insufficient for FAA standards. The FAA mandated to JFK:

- To perform a daily runway inspection, especially near bird strike prone areas
- To participate or create an effective bird hazard handling program
- To eliminate several sewer outlets and dumps which attract sea gulls
- Eliminate rodents or rabbits which attract sea gulls
- Eliminate trees in the immediate area, especially bird-loved areas

=== Engine hazard protection ===
The Federal Aviation Administration and the National Transportation provided a recommendation to General Electric about bird strike protection to the CF6-6 and CF6-50 series engines stating that the epoxy resin must be replaced with an Aluminium Honeycomb which will reduce the contained damage the critical and fragile engine compressor.

=== Seat belt recommendation ===
On June 15, 1978, a recommendation was also sent to American Safety Inc. that the restraints on the ONA DC-10's involving this and another non-fatal accident in Turkey in 1976 were not sufficient. Once the seatbelt was extended beyond 7 - 10 inches (for example, as the belt was being fastened) a locking mechanism would engage to prevent the seatbelt from extending further, thus securing the individual into the seat. However, if the belt were allowed to retract back to 7 - 10 inches, then the locking mechanism would disengage and the belt could then be pulled out once again, potentially to its maximum length of 19 inches. This was a problem if a physically small individual occupied the seat, as the seatbelt might retract enough for the locking mechanism to disengage, even while the individual was wearing the belt. One flight attendant in this accident was thrown off from her jumpseat and in the accident in Turkey, three flight attendants were thrown off from their jumpseats.

== See also ==
- Continental Airlines Flight 1404, another non-fatal takeoff runway excursion
- US Airways Flight 1549, another non-fatal birdstrike accident
- Pacific Western Airlines Flight 501, another non-fatal fire related aviation accident
- Biman Bangladesh Airlines Flight 060, non-fatal landing accident
- Ryanair Flight 4102, non-fatal birdstrike landing accident
- Kalitta Air Flight 207, non-fatal birdstrike accident
- 2021 Houston MD-87 crash, similar runway excursion
- China Airlines Flight 120
- Southwest Air Lines Flight 611
- Air France Flight 358 & British Airways Flight 38 were both non-fatal landing accidents
- British Airways Flight 2276 & Korean Air Flight 2708 were both uncontained engine failure incidents
