= China Airlines Flight 120 =

2007 aviation accident in Japan

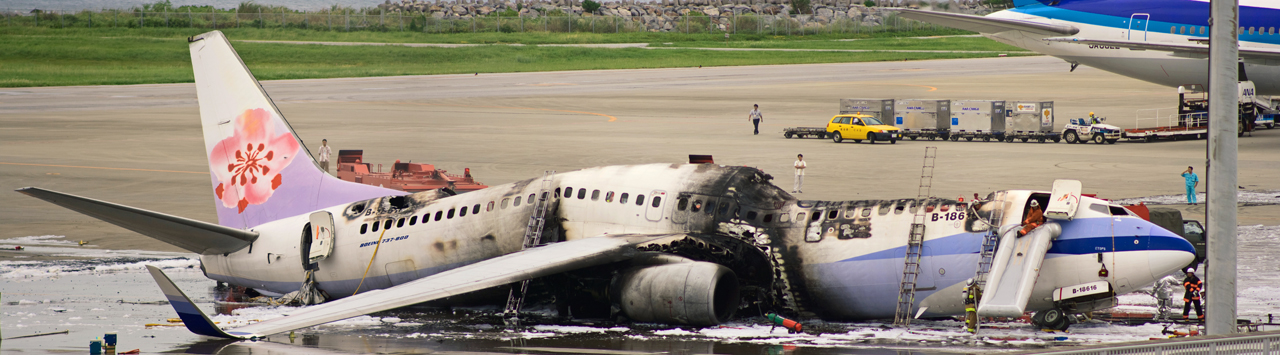
- The burnt-out and partially melted wreckage of the aircraft at Naha Airport

Accident
- Date: 20 August 2007
- Summary: Mechanical failure leading to fuel leak and engine fire due to improper maintenance and design flaw
- Site: Naha Airport, Naha, Okinawa Prefecture, Japan; 26°11′45″N 127°38′45″E
- Total injuries: 4

Aircraft
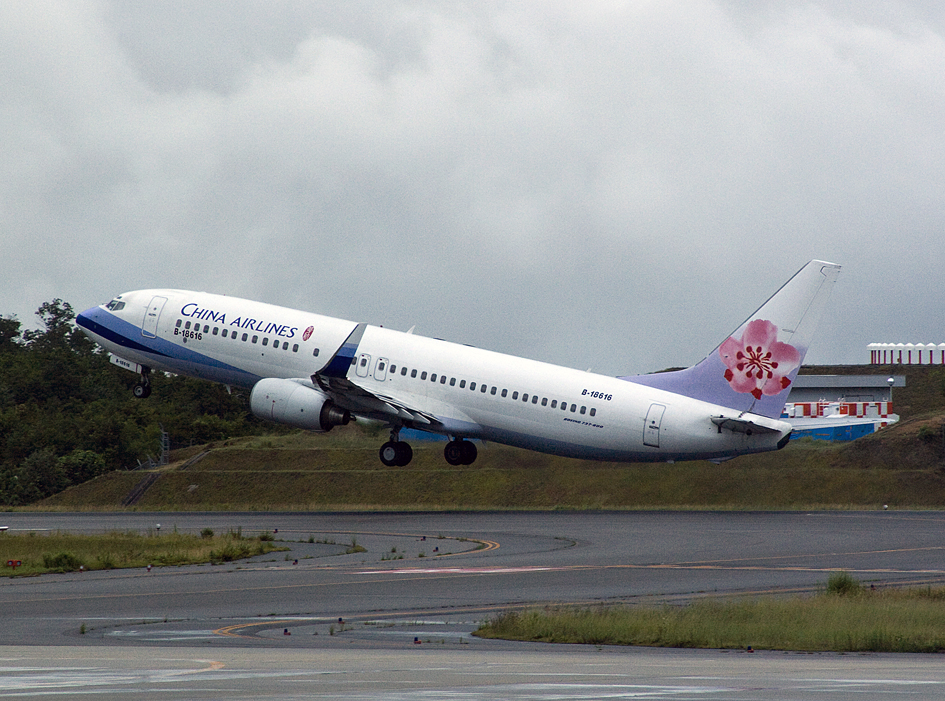
- B-18616, the aircraft involved in the accident, photographed in 2006
- Aircraft type: Boeing 737-809(WL)
- Operator: China Airlines
- IATA flight No.: CI120
- ICAO flight No.: CAL120
- Call sign: DYNASTY 120
- Registration: B-18616
- Flight origin: Taiwan Taoyuan International Airport, Taiwan
- Destination: Naha Airport, Okinawa Prefecture, Japan
- Occupants: 165
- Passengers: 157
- Crew: 8
- Fatalities: 0
- Injuries: 3
- Survivors: 165

Ground casualties
- Ground injuries: 1

China Airlines Flight 120 was a regularly scheduled international flight from Taoyuan International Airport in Taoyuan County (now Taoyuan City), Taiwan to Naha Airport in Okinawa Prefecture, Japan. On 20 August 2007, the Boeing 737-800 aircraft operating the flight caught fire and exploded after landing and taxiing to the gate area at Naha Airport. Four people—three from the aircraft and one ground crew—sustained injuries in the accident. The fire was caused by a loose bolt puncturing a fuel tank. The aircraft was written off.

== Background ==
=== Aircraft ===
The aircraft involved, manufactured in June 2002, was a Boeing 737-809 (WL) registered as B-18616 with serial number 30175. The aircraft and its two CFM International CFM56-7B26 engines logged around 13,664 hours of airframe hours.

=== Passengers and crew ===
The captain was a 47-year-old male who had logged 7941 hours and 17 minutes of flying time, 3823 hours and 38 minutes of which were logged onto the Boeing 737-800. His co-pilot, aged 26, had logged 890 hours and 38 minutes of flying time, including 182 hours and 30 minutes on the Boeing 737-800.

There were 157 passengers on board the aircraft, including 2 infants. Of the number, 110 passengers were from Taiwan, 23 were from Japan, and 24 were from other countries. The crew of eight were mostly Taiwanese, with one Japanese flight attendant.

== Accident sequence ==
The plane landed normally at 10:26 a.m. local time and taxied to the gate area by 10:34. Ground crew noticed flames coming from engine number 2 as Captain You Chien-kou shut it down in anticipation of gate connection. Informed about the situation by air traffic controllers, the captain ordered an emergency evacuation. All passengers and flight attendants managed to leave the aircraft safely through the four hatches using slides. After the last flight attendant had fled from the right aft hatch, Captain You and First Officer Tseng Ta-wei, the last two people on board, exited the aircraft through the cockpit window. The pilots attempted to use the cockpit escape rope to climb to the ground, but the first officer was knocked off the rope when the number 2 engine and right wing fuel tanks exploded, triggering a large fireball that consumed much of the fuselage. The captain subsequently leapt from the window without using the rope. Both pilots were uninjured and managed to run away from the plane. A statement from the airline confirmed that all passengers and crew members were evacuated safely. A 57-year-old Taiwanese man suffered from hypertension and an 8-year-old girl from Hong Kong felt unwell; both were sent to a hospital nearby. An airport ground crew member was hurt during evacuation on the ground, and a flight attendant, who was the last person to leave the cabin, fell over on the ground when the aircraft exploded.

It took about four and a half minutes from when the fire was reported to the airport fire service until the start of fire fighting actions. Japanese regulations require a response time of three minutes or less. The delay was in part because the tower controller could not hear the fire crews' radioed requests for permission to use the taxiways to reach the fire. With no response, the fire crews decided to use the taxiways anyway without permission.

The taxiways of Naha Airport were closed until 11:03 a.m. because of the accident.

According to Naha Airport air traffic control, the status of the aircraft was normal in that there was no report of any abnormal situation during cruising or landing.

Following the accident, the Republic of China Civil Aeronautics Administration grounded all 14 remaining Boeing 737-800s of China Airlines, Mandarin Airlines and the Republic of China Air Force for inspection of the fuel systems. The Japan Civil Aviation Bureau asked Japanese operators of 737-700 and 737-800 aircraft to similarly inspect their aircraft. No anomalies were found and the aircraft returned to service.

== Investigation ==
The cause of the accident was investigated by the Aircraft and Railway Accidents Investigation Commission of Japan. The crew, as confirmed by the recording in the cockpit voice recorder, did not observe any abnormalities before the accident.

The investigating team confirmed that the aircraft caught fire in the gate area and the sign of fuel leakage onto the tarmac when taxi to the gate. The investigation focused on the possibility that a fuel leak led to the fire. At a news conference on August 24, investigators revealed that a bolt, which had come loose from the slat track, had punctured the right wing fuel tank, creating a hole 2–3 centimetres (0.79–1.18 in) in diameter.

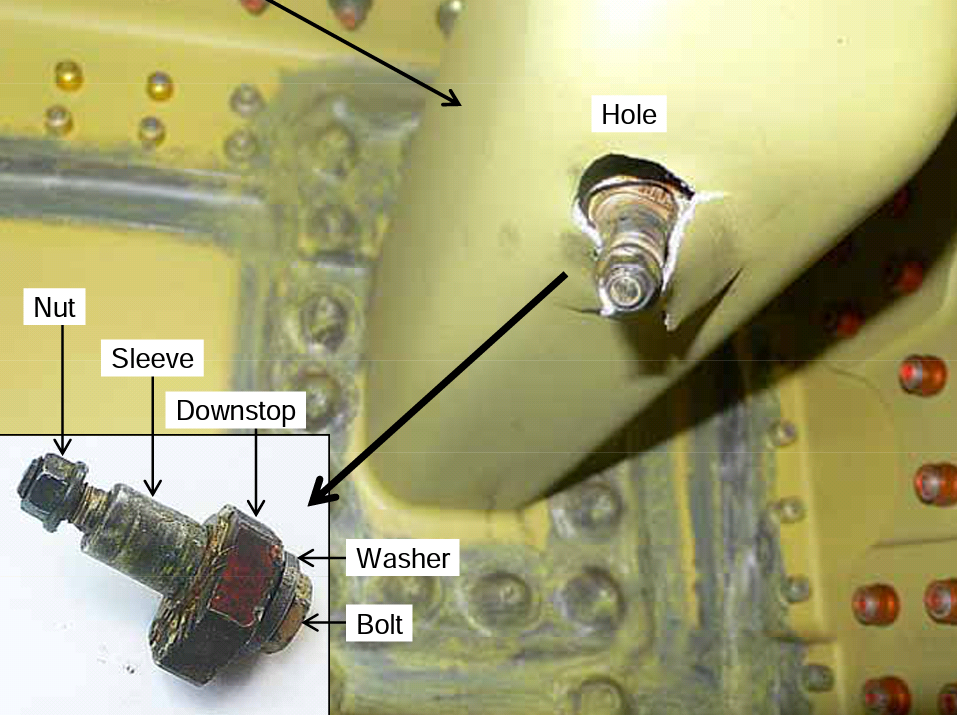
Picture of the bolt that punctured the fuel tank

On 28 August 2009, the Japan Transport Safety Board (JTSB) published the results of the investigation. It is considered highly probable that this accident occurred through the following causal chain: When the aircraft retracted the slats after landing at Naha Airport, the track can that housed the inboard main track of the No. 5 slat on the right wing was punctured, creating a hole. Fuel leaked out through the hole, reaching the outside of the wing. A fire started when the leaked fuel came into contact with high-temperature areas on the right engine after the aircraft stopped in its assigned spot, and the aircraft burned out after several explosions.

With regard to the cause of the puncture in the track can, it is certain that the downstop assembly having detached from the aft end of the above-mentioned inboard main track fell off into the track can, and when the slat was retracted, the assembly was pressed by the track against the track can and punctured it.

With regard to the cause of the detachment of the downstop assembly, it is considered highly probable that during maintenance to prevent the nut from loosening, which the company carried out on the downstop assembly about one and a half months prior to the accident based on the service letter from the manufacturer of the aircraft, the washer on the nut side of the assembly fell off, following which the downstop on the nut side of the assembly fell off and then the downstop assembly eventually fell off the track. It is considered highly probable that the key factor contributing to detachment of the downstop assembly was its design, which relied on a washer to prevent the assembly from falling off.

With regard to the detachment of the washer, it is considered probable that the following factors contributed to this: Despite the fact that the nut was in a location difficult to access or inspect during maintenance, neither the manufacturer nor the airline paid sufficient attention to this when preparing the service letter and engineering order job card, respectively. Also, neither the maintenance operator nor the job supervisor reported the difficulty of the job to superiors.

The Japan Transport Safety Board recommended the Civil Aeronautics Administration of Taiwan to supervise China Airlines to take the following actions: when planning and implementing maintenance jobs, the scope of jobs should be fully ascertained and the working conditions and environments should be appropriately evaluated, and the countermeasures to prevent maintenance errors including the actions taken in 2009 against the recurrence of this accident should be steadfastly implemented and enhanced.

== Aftermath ==
China Airlines stated they would compensate passengers NT$1000 for every kilogram of luggage lost, for a maximum of NT$20,000 for checked-in pieces of luggage and another NT$20,000 maximum for carry-on luggage.

In the stock trading after the accident, China Airlines stock fell along with Taiwan Fire & Marine Insurance Co.

Due to the accident, on August 25, the United States Federal Aviation Administration (FAA) ordered emergency inspections of wing leading-edge slat tracks on all Next Generation Boeing 737 aircraft. The emergency airworthiness directive (EAD) from the FAA required operators to inspect the slat track downstop to check for missing parts, ensure proper installation, and check the inside of the slat can for foreign object debris and damage, with the first inspection required within 24 days and a reinspection every 3000 flight cycles thereafter. Following feedback from completed inspections revealing loose parts in several other aircraft and one with a damaged slat can, the FAA issued a new emergency airworthiness directive on August 28. Airlines were then required to perform the inspection on Next Generation Boeing 737 aircraft within 10 days instead of 24 days. In addition, the ADs required a one-time torquing of the nut and bolt in the downstop assembly for the slat track within 24 days.

== In popular culture ==
This accident was featured in Season 16, Episode 4 of Mayday. The episode was titled "Deadly Detail".

== See also ==
- British Airtours Flight 28M
- Pacific Western Airlines Flight 501
- British Airways Flight 2276
- American Airlines Flight 383
