= Tibet Airlines Flight 9833 =

2022 aviation accident in Chongqing, China

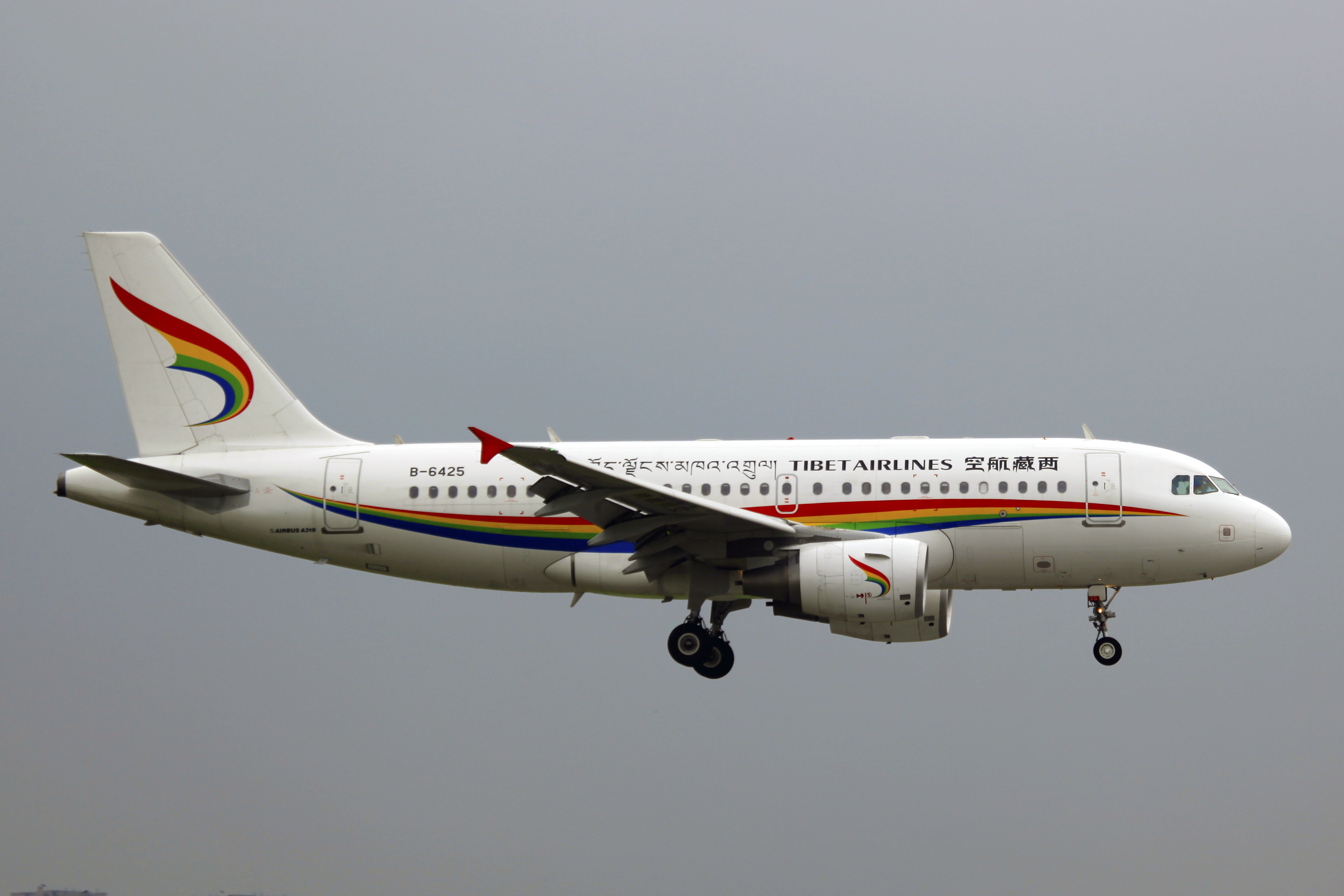
- B-6425, the aircraft involved in the accident in 2013

Accident
- Date: 12 May 2022
- Summary: Runway excursion following rejected takeoff leading to fire
- Site: Chongqing Jiangbei International Airport, Yubei District, Chongqing, China

Aircraft
- Aircraft type: Airbus A319-115
- Operator: Tibet Airlines
- IATA flight No.: TV9833
- ICAO flight No.: TBA9833
- Call sign: TIBET 9833
- Registration: B-6425
- Flight origin: Chongqing Jiangbei International Airport, Chongqing, China
- Destination: Nyingchi Mainling Airport, Mainling, Tibet, China
- Occupants: 122
- Passengers: 113
- Crew: 9
- Fatalities: 0
- Injuries: 36
- Survivors: 122

Tibet Airlines Flight 9833 was a scheduled commercial passenger flight in China from Chongqing to Nyingchi. On 12 May 2022, the Airbus A319 operating the service suffered a runway excursion, causing both engines to separate, followed by a fire near the front of the aircraft. All 122 people on board were evacuated, and 36 people were minorly injured from the evacuation.

== Accident ==
During the aircraft's takeoff roll, the pilots experienced an "abnormality" and aborted the takeoff. The plane veered off the runway, its engines detaching in the process. The engines, as well as the front of the aircraft, subsequently caught on fire. All 122 passengers and crew were evacuated with 36 of them receiving minor injuries.

== Aircraft ==
The aircraft involved was an Airbus A319-115, MSN 5157, registered as B-6425, which was manufactured by Airbus Industrie in 2012. The aircraft had logged 28364 airframe hours and around 14495 takeoff and landing cycles. It was equipped with two CFM international CFM56-5B7/P engines.

== Investigation ==
One week after the accident the Civil Aviation Authority of China (CAAC) opened an investigation into the accident.

The CAAC Southwest Regional Administration released its report on 5 June 2024 (in Chinese language only): an English version of the report is also available. It found that the accident was caused by crew error. The CAAC imposed a CN¥ 900,000 fine on Tibet Airlines and fined the company's leadership: The two executives primarily responsible were fined 40% of their 2021 income, while three others responsible were fined 30% of their 2021 income. The CAAC also revoked the pilot's licenses of the captain and co-captain and suspended the first officer's pilot's license for six months.

== See also ==
- British Airways Flight 2276
- Korean Air Flight 2708
- British Airtours Flight 28M
- American Airlines Flight 383
