= Rejected takeoff =

The abort of an aircraft's departure from land or water

In aviation, a rejected takeoff (RTO) or aborted takeoff is the situation in which the pilot decides to abort the takeoff of an airplane after initiating the takeoff roll but before the airplane leaves the ground.

Reasons to perform a rejected takeoff vary but are usually related to a suspected or actual problem with the aircraft, such as an engine failure; fire; incorrect configuration; aircraft control issue; unusually slow acceleration; automated warning signal(s) indicating a critical system failure; environmental conditions such as predictive windshear; or an instruction from air traffic control.

There are three phases of a takeoff. In the low-speed regime, usually below 80 kts or so, the takeoff will be rejected even for minor failures. In the high-speed regime, above usually 80 kts but below V_{1}, minor problems are ignored, but the takeoff will still be rejected for serious problems, in particular for engine failures. The takeoff decision speed, known as V_{1}, is calculated before each flight for larger multi-engine airplanes. Below the decision speed, the airplane should be able to stop safely before the end of the runway. Above the decision speed, the airplane may overshoot the runway if the takeoff is aborted, and, therefore, a rejected takeoff is normally not performed above this speed, unless there is reason to doubt the airplane's ability to fly. If a serious failure occurs or is suspected above V_{1}, but the airplane's ability to fly is not in doubt, the takeoff is continued despite the (suspected) failure, and the airplane will attempt to land again as soon as possible. If the airplane's ability to fly is in doubt (for instance, in the event of a major flight-control failure which leaves the airplane unable to rotate for liftoff), the best option may well be to reject the takeoff even if after V_{1}, accepting the likelihood of a runway overrun.

Single-engine aircraft will reject any takeoff after an engine failure, regardless of speed, as there is no power available to continue the takeoff. Even if the airplane is already airborne, if sufficient runway remains, an attempt to land straight ahead on the runway may be made. This may also apply to some light twin-engine airplanes.

Before the takeoff roll is started, the autobrake system of the aircraft, if available, is armed. The autobrake system will automatically apply maximum brakes if throttle is reduced to idle or reverse thrust during the takeoff roll once a preset speed has been reached.

== Testing ==
A RTO is usually seen as one of the most challenging tests an airplane has to undergo for its certification trials. The RTO test is performed under the worst possible conditions; i.e. with fully worn out brakes, the plane loaded to maximum takeoff weight and no use of thrust reversers. During a RTO test most of the kinetic energy of the airplane is converted to heat by the brakes, which may cause the fusible plugs of the tires to melt, causing them to deflate. Small brake fires are acceptable, providing that in the first five minutes, they do not prejudice the safe and complete evacuation of the aircraft.

== Related accidents ==
- 2008 South Carolina Learjet 60 crash – an RTO above V_{1}, four fatalities
- 1990 Wayne County Airport runway collision – RTO after collision following runway incursion; aircraft struck destroyed with eight fatalities, aircraft that performed RTO damaged with no fatalities, later repaired and returned to service
- Air France Flight 007 – RTO above V_{1} after flight-control failure, 130 fatalities
- American Airlines Flight 383 – uncontained engine failure and fire
- Ameristar Charters Flight 9363 – RTO above V_{1} after flight-control failure, aircraft written off but no fatalities
- British Airtours Flight 28M – uncontained engine failure that damaged a fuel tank, resulting in a major fire and 55 fatalities
- British Airways Flight 2276 – uncontained engine failure
- Garuda Indonesia Flight 865 – RTO after engine failure, three fatalities
- Korean Air Flight 2708 – uncontained engine failure, no fatalities, aircraft later repaired and returned to service
- Overseas National Airways Flight 032 – uncontained engine failure attributed to bird ingestion, aircraft destroyed by fire but no fatalities
- Spantax Flight 995 – an RTO above V_{1}, 50 fatalities
- TWA Flight 843 – RTO after instrument failure, aircraft destroyed by fire but no fatalities

== See also ==
- Balanced field takeoff
