= Guy Eby =

American aviator (1918–2021)

Guy Eby (November 9, 1918 – July 30, 2021) was an American airline captain who kept the commercial airplane he was flying (American Airlines Flight 182) from colliding with another one (TWA Flight 37) on November 26, 1975, following a mistake from an air traffic controller in Cleveland, Ohio.

== Early life ==
Eby was born on November 9, 1918, in Ephrata, Pennsylvania. He received the Air Medal in 1946 for his services for United States Navy (1938–1950) against Japan in 1945 towards the end of World War II. He flew in the Berlin Blockade. He joined American Airlines in 1950.

== 1975 Michigan mid-air incident ==
1975 Michigan mid-air incident
Incident
- Date: November 26, 1975
- Summary: Near miss
- Site: Over Carleton, Michigan, United States
- Total fatalities: 0
- Total injuries: 24
- Total survivors: 319

First aircraft
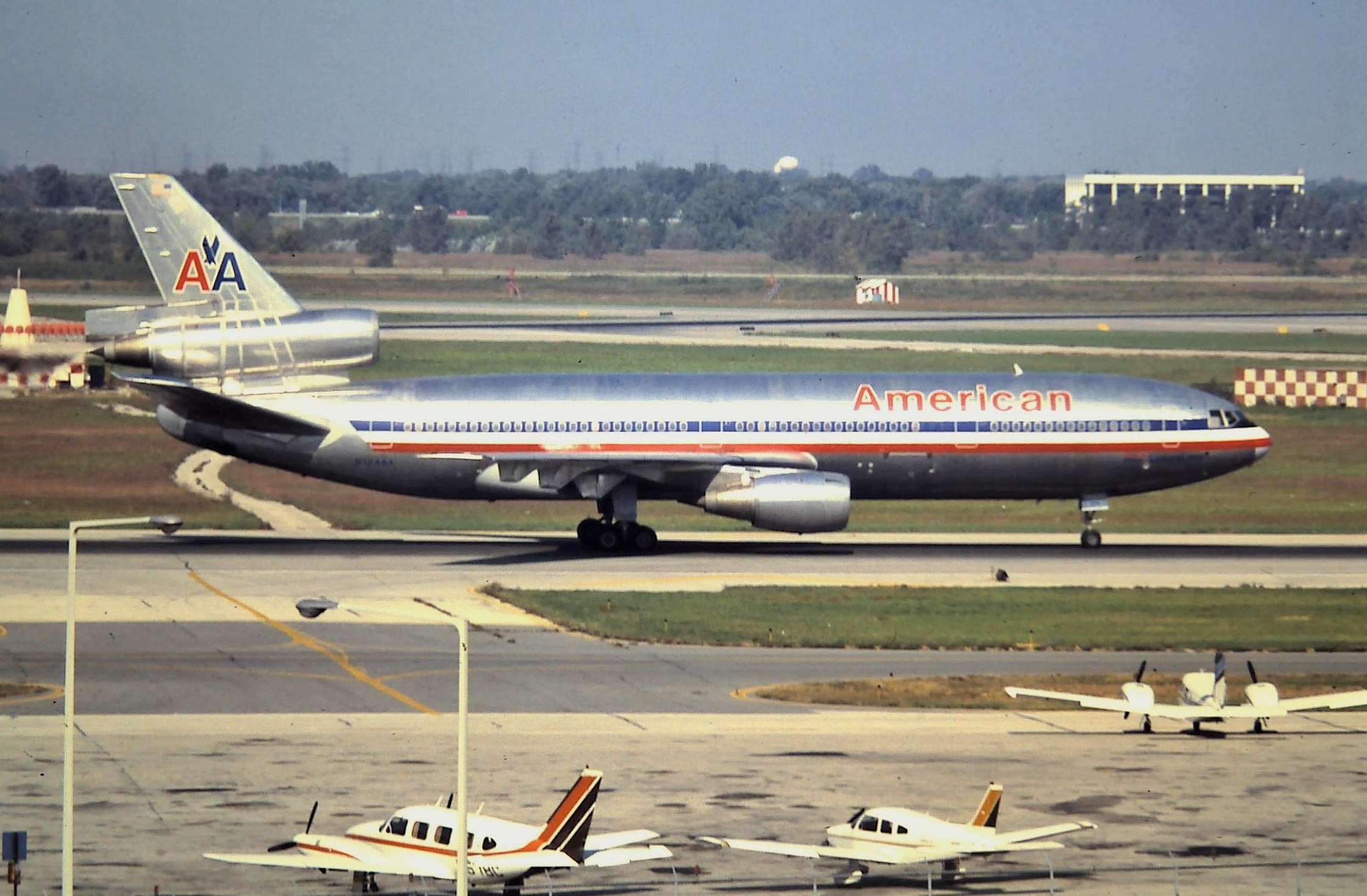
- N124AA, the DC-10 involved in the incident, pictured in 1980
- Type: McDonnell Douglas DC-10-10
- Operator: American Airlines
- IATA flight No.: AA182
- ICAO flight No.: AAL182
- Call sign: AMERICAN 182 HEAVY
- Registration: N124AA
- Flight origin: Chicago O'Hare International Airport
- Destination: Newark Liberty International Airport
- Occupants: 205
- Passengers: 192
- Crew: 13
- Fatalities: 0
- Injuries: 24
- Survivors: 205

Second aircraft
- N11002, the L-1011 TriStar involved in the incident, seen in 1972
- Type: Lockheed L-1011 TriStar
- Operator: Trans World Airlines
- IATA flight No.: TW37
- ICAO flight No.: TWA37
- Call sign: TWA 37
- Registration: N11002
- Flight origin: Philadelphia International Airport
- Destination: Los Angeles International Airport
- Occupants: 114
- Passengers: 103
- Crew: 11
- Fatalities: 0
- Survivors: 114

The two planes, carrying a combined 319 passengers and crew members—192 passengers and 13 crew members on board American Airlines Flight 182, plus 103 passengers and 11 crew members on board Trans World Airlines (TWA) Flight 37—were reportedly just 100 feet (30 m) away from each other as they flew over the city of Carleton, Michigan. Eby's plane (an American Airlines DC-10 flying that day as Flight 182) was headed towards Newark, New Jersey, from Chicago, Illinois; it had originated in San Francisco, California. The other plane (a TWA Lockheed L-1011 TriStar flying that day as Flight 37) was heading from Philadelphia, Pennsylvania, to Los Angeles, California.

The TWA flight was cruising at FL350, and American had been cleared to climb through that level to FL370. The Cleveland radar controller knew a conflict was possible but deferred action, assuming he'd see in time if separation didn't work out. He then got absorbed in secondary duties. About a minute before the near-collision, a second controller took over, and neither noticed the unresolved conflict during the handoff. About 50 seconds into his shift, the new controller spotted the conflict and cleared the American flight to descend immediately to FL330.

Eby quickly lowered his plane's altitude at 35,000 feet (11,000 m) amidst a significant cloud cover, an action which ultimately saved the lives of his passengers and the flight crew. All 10 flight attendants plus 14 passengers suffered injuries on the American Airlines plane (the incident occurred while dinner was being served), and it was forced to make an emergency landing in Detroit. At the time, Eby had already logged flight time of nearly 22,000 hours. Had the collision not been avoided, it would have been the deadliest aviation disaster in the history of United States up to that time.

The TWA plane involved in the incident was later destroyed by a fire on July 30, 1992, while flying as TWA Flight 843.

== Later life ==
Eby retired from American Airlines in 1978. Eby turned 100 on November 9, 2018, in Ormond Beach, Florida, where he had resided since 1983. One of the passengers in the American Airlines Flight 182, Burt Herman, wrote and published a book about Eby and the incident, called Eby: Master of the Moment in 2018. Eby died in Ormond Beach on July 30, 2021, at the age of 102.
