= 1985 Manchester Airport disaster =

1985 aviation accident in England

1985 Manchester Airport disaster British Airtours Flight 28M
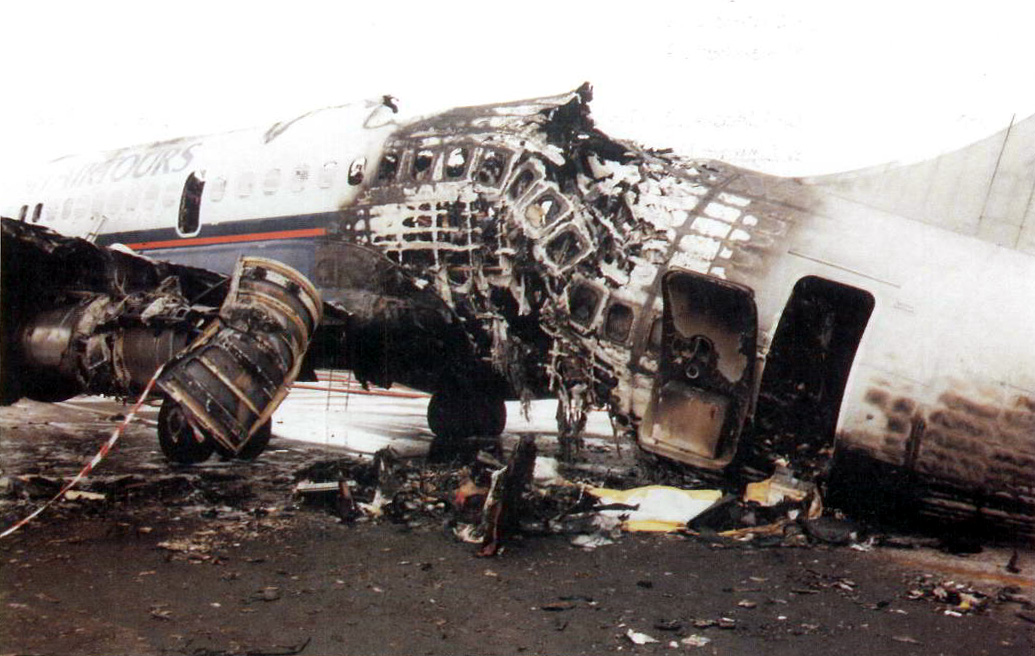
- Fire damage to the rear-tail section of the aircraft

Accident
- Date: 22 August 1985
- Summary: Fire on the ground caused by uncontained engine failure on takeoff
- Site: Manchester Airport Manchester, England; 53°21′4″N 2°16′54″W

Aircraft
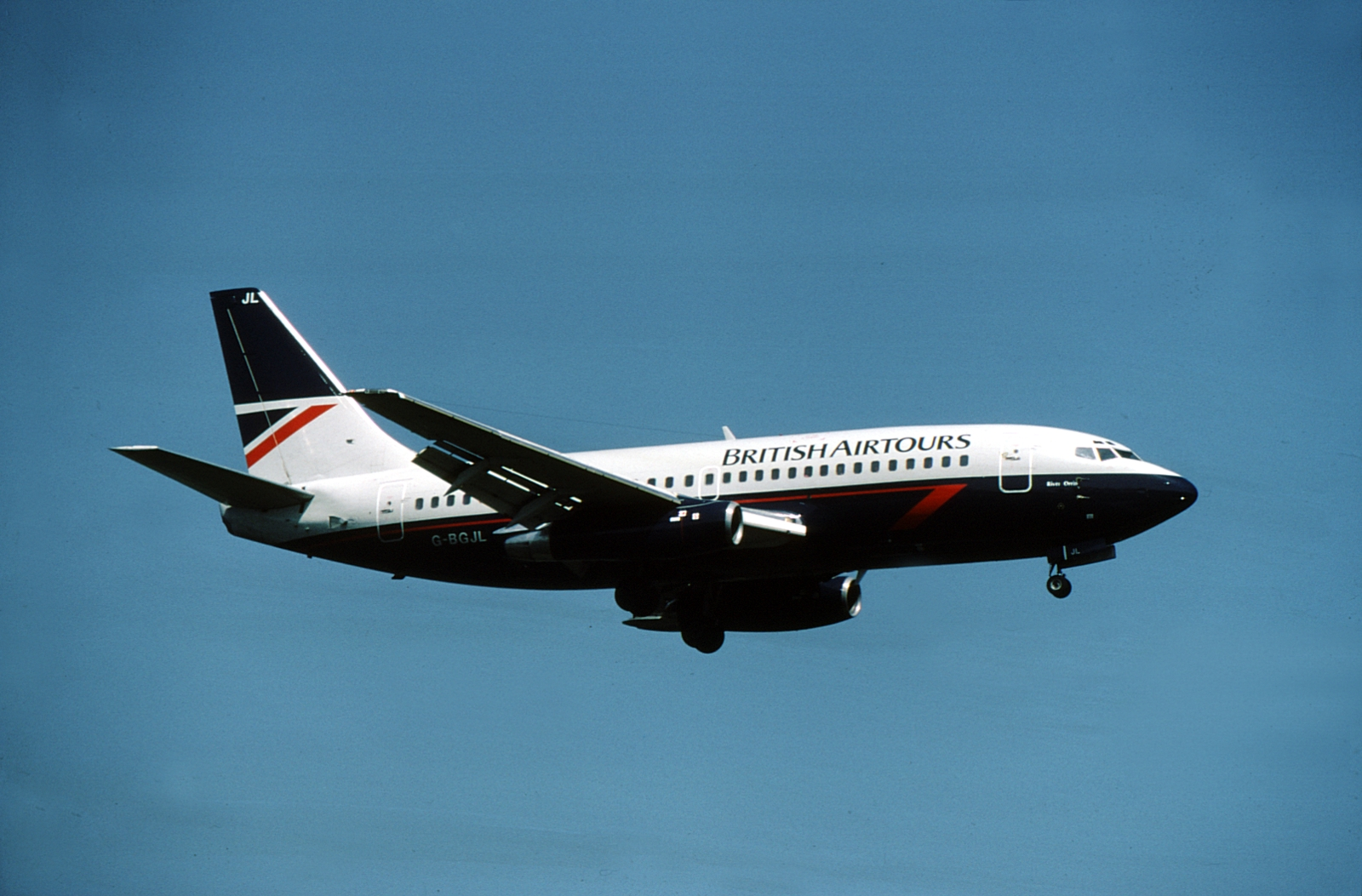
- G-BGJL, the aircraft involved in the accident, seen in June 1985
- Aircraft type: Boeing 737-236 Advanced
- Aircraft name: River Orrin
- Operator: British Airtours
- IATA flight No.: KT28M (Note: The flight number according to the final report. Other sources list the flight number as "328".)
- ICAO flight No.: BKT28M
- Call sign: BEATOURS 28 MIKE
- Registration: G-BGJL
- Flight origin: Manchester Airport
- Destination: Corfu International Airport
- Occupants: 137
- Passengers: 131
- Crew: 6
- Fatalities: 55
- Injuries: 15
- Survivors: 82

The 1985 Manchester Airport disaster occurred when British Airtours Flight 28M (also known as Flight 328), an international passenger flight, was en route from Manchester Airport to Corfu International Airport. It caught fire on takeoff on 22 August 1985, resulting in 55 fatalities.

The aircraft, a Boeing 737-200, named River Orrin, was flown by British Airtours, a wholly owned subsidiary of British Airways. It had 131 passengers and 6 crew on the manifest. During the takeoff roll, a loud thump was heard, and takeoff was aborted. An engine failure had generated a fire and the captain ordered evacuation. The engine failure was later traced to an incorrectly repaired combustor can, causing it to rupture and its dome to puncture the left wing fuel tank. Most of the deaths were due to smoke inhalation, not burns; 82 people survived.

The accident was described as "a defining moment in the history of civil aviation safety". It brought about industry-wide changes to the seating layout near emergency exits, fire-resistant seat covers, floor lighting, fire-resistant wall and ceiling panels, more fire extinguishers and clearer evacuation rules.

== Aircraft ==
The aircraft involved was a Boeing 737-236(A), registered as G-BGJL with serial number 743. It was manufactured by Boeing Commercial Airplanes in April 1981 and was powered by two Pratt & Whitney JT8D-15A engines. It had logged 12977 airframe hours in 5907 takeoff and landing cycles.

== Accident ==
=== Attempted takeoff ===
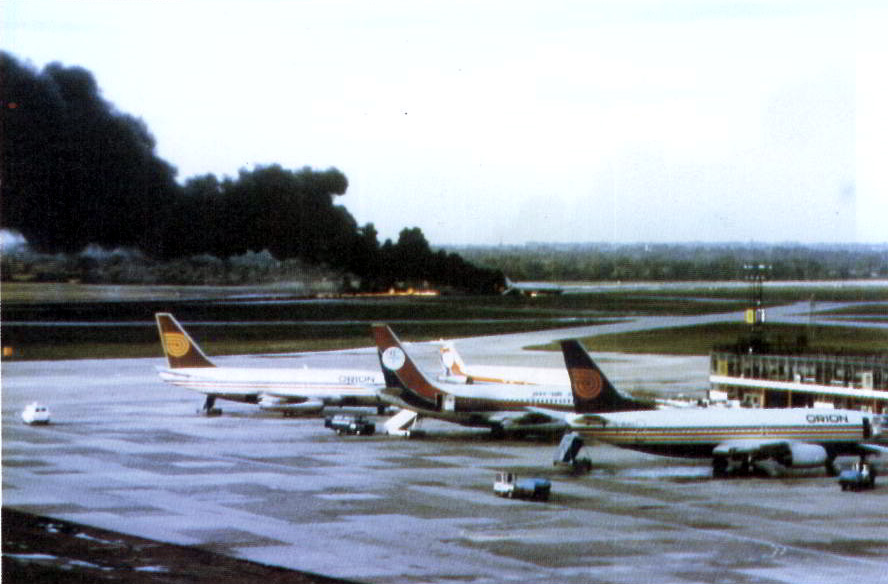
Flight 28M (background) as it turns from Runway 24 to Link D. Note the deployment of the right rear escape slide.

The flight crew, Captain Peter Terrington (39), and First Officer Brian Love (52), were seasoned pilots with 8,441 and 12,277 flight hours (including 1,276 and 345 hours on the Boeing 737), respectively. At 07:13 BST (06:13 UTC), on runway 24 at Manchester Airport during the takeoff phase, the pilots heard a loud thump coming from underneath the plane. Thinking a tyre had burst, the captain ordered an abandoned takeoff and then activated the thrust reversers. The first officer, who was in control of the aircraft at the time, applied "harsh" braking for about five seconds. The captain, concerned about the possible burst tyre, instructed the first officer to use less wheel braking, which was done. Fire warnings sounded in the flight deck nine seconds after the thump was heard (about 36 seconds before the aircraft stopped). Ten seconds later, the tower controller confirmed, "right, there's a lot of fire". Twenty-five seconds after the thud was heard (about 20 seconds before the aircraft stopped), the tower controller suggested evacuating passengers to the right side. The tower controller activated the airport's fire-alarm siren the moment he first saw smoke coming from the aircraft, but firefighters working for the airport's fire service had heard a "bang" and seen the smoke and fire for themselves, and had already initiated a response on their own.

=== Forward evacuation ===
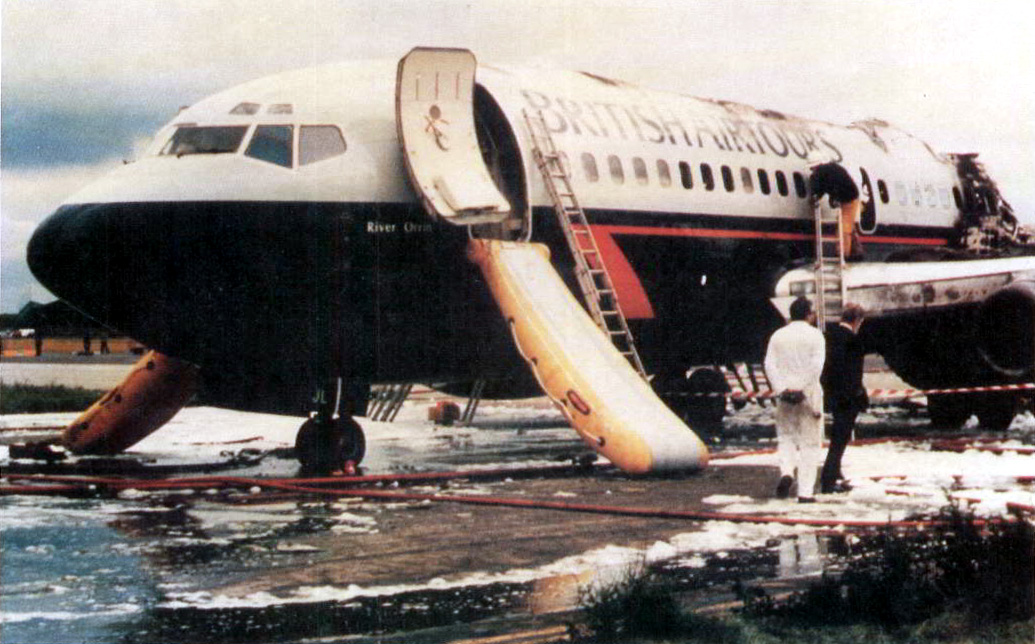
Forward section of the aircraft showing left and right escape slides deployed

The aircraft turned off the runway onto a short taxiway called link "D" and came to a full stop facing northwest. Evacuation efforts began immediately, but several difficulties were encountered. Arthur Bradbury, the purser and the crew's senior flight attendant, tried to open the right front exit door about 10 seconds before the aircraft stopped, but it jammed due to a design fault in the emergency slide system and he abandoned attempts to open it. After about 25 seconds, Bradbury opened the left front door and successfully deployed the escape slide. At this time, the first two fire engines arrived. One began showering the fuselage and the open door with foam to prevent the fire from spreading to the door and the slide as passengers were evacuating, and to provide cooling to protect the passengers still inside.

When the second fire engine arrived, the first fire engine concentrated on the burning jet fuel and the left engine. The second sprayed foam over the fuselage and the open door. During this time, the "No. 4 stewardess", Joanna Toff, had kept passengers out of the forward galley area to allow the purser time to open a door. When the left side door was opened, exiting passengers jammed themselves in the narrow 57 cm-wide (22.5 in) passageway between the two forward galley bulkheads. Toff bodily pulled the passengers out one at a time until she cleared the jam. Meanwhile, the purser had resumed working on the right front door, and he successfully opened the door fully and deployed the escape slide about one minute after the plane had stopped. Sixteen passengers and Toff escaped through the left front door, one of whom was dragged out by Toff while unconscious. The purser and 34 passengers made their escape through the right front door.

=== Overwing evacuation ===
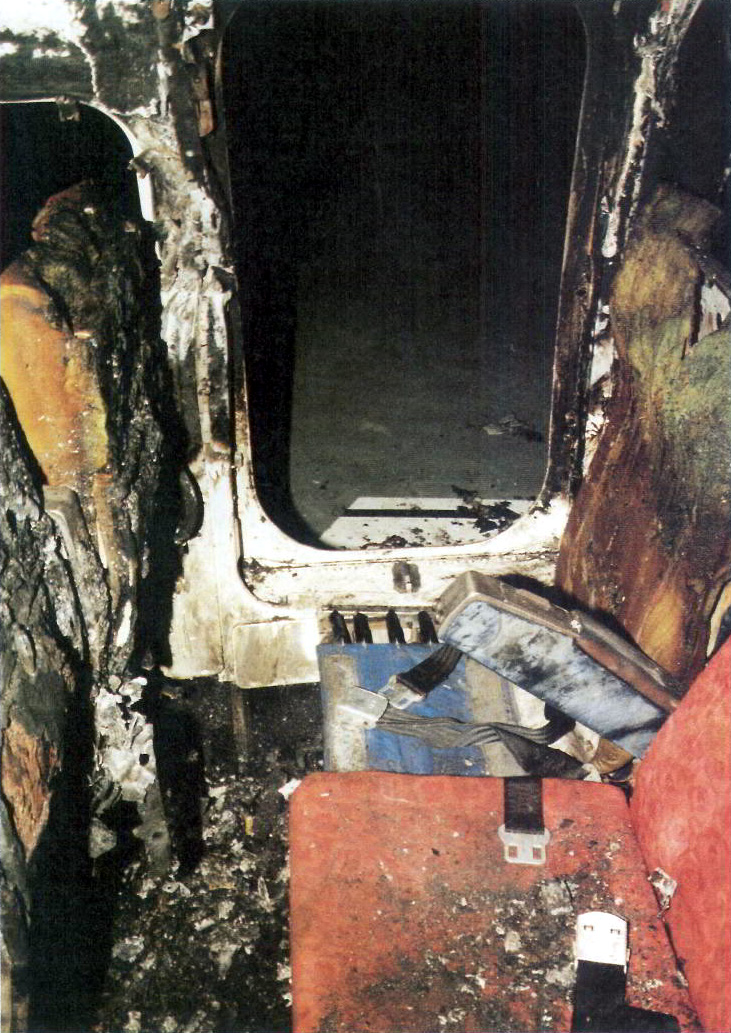
Seats relative to the right overwing emergency exit after the accident: The arm rest is partly down. The seat back for the seat closest to the window, seat 10F, was returned to its upright position before this photo was taken.

More difficulties were encountered at the overwing exits. The left overwing exit was blocked by smoke and flames. The passenger seated at the right overwing exit had difficulty understanding how to operate the hatch. At that time, no requirement existed that exit-row passengers receive a briefing on how and when to open the hatch. Once the 22 kg (48 lb) hatch was released, it fell inward onto the passenger seated next to it, trapping her. Two passengers lifted the hatch and put it on a seat in the next row back, making the exit available for use 45 seconds after the aircraft had stopped. Once the hatch had been removed, passengers still encountered difficulties in getting to and using this exit. The exit-row seats allowed only 27 cm (10.5 in) to pass through, the armrests between those seats remained down, and the exit was directly over a seat, requiring passengers to manoeuvre awkwardly to escape. Passengers in the rear of the aircraft were panicking as smoke, and eventually flames, filled the hot cabin at about the same time the right overwing exit was opened. Passengers crawled over seat backs to get to the right overwing exit as well as the two front exits; some survivors told investigators that the aisle had become blocked with bodies.

This caused jamming at all exits, and the seat over which the overwing exit was located failed in such a way that the seat back collapsed forward, causing a further obstruction. A man who had been seated in 16C was found dead lying across this exit, and investigators were unsure whether the seat back collapse had trapped him. A 14-year-old boy was found lying across the top of the man from seat 16C by firefighters 5 1/2 minutes after the aircraft had stopped. He was alive, suffering only superficial burns to his hands. He was the last of 27 survivors to escape through that exit, and the last evacuee to survive the accident. Most of the 38 bodies were found clustered around the overwing exit. This exit was the first exit available to the 76 passengers seated behind it or even with it, and the nearest exit for 100 passengers.

=== Fire and loss of aft exits ===
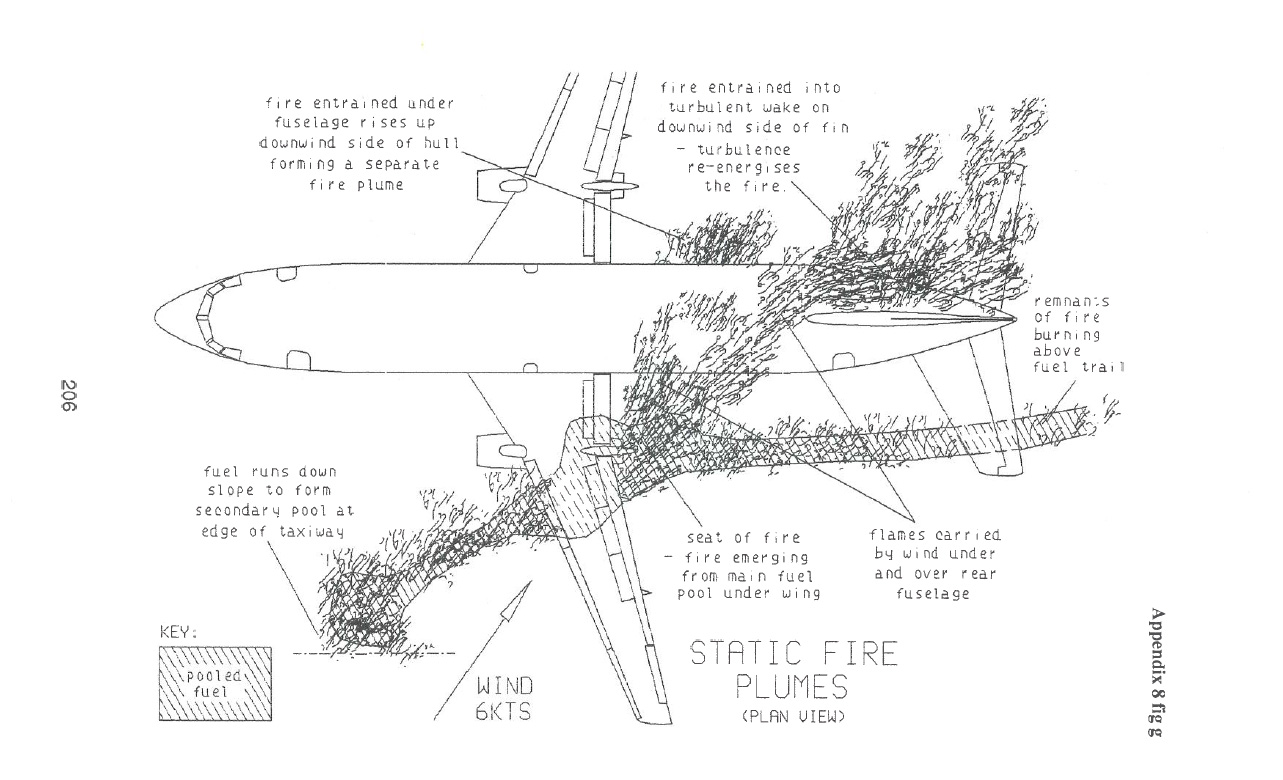
Orientation of wind, pooling fuel, and flames relative to the aircraft after it stopped on taxiway link D.

Fuel had been spilling from the left wing from the moment the first loud noise was heard. That fuel had ignited on contact with flames from the hole in the engine combustion chamber as the aircraft began to decelerate on the runway. When the aircraft stopped, fuel was still leaking from a 270 cm^{2} (42 sq in) opening at a rate of 450–680 litres per minute (98–149 imperial gallons, 118–179 US gallons), feeding a growing fire. By about this time, the fire had already penetrated the aluminium alloy skin of the aircraft below the level of the floor in the passenger compartment. The AAIB estimated that between five seconds before and 13 seconds after the aircraft stopped were needed for fire to penetrate the fuselage skin. Passengers seated on the left side of the aisle and toward the rear felt intense radiant heat from the fire, and were very impatient to escape, many of them standing and crowding into the aisles while the aircraft was in motion.

As the aircraft began its right turn off the runway, around ten seconds before it stopped, one of the two flight attendants in the rear of the aircraft, probably the No 3 stewardess, opened the right rear door and deployed the emergency chute, but no one escaped through this door because it was blocked by smoke and flames. When the aircraft came to a stop, it was facing the northwest, and a light wind of 6–7 knots (7–8 mph; 11–13 km/h) was blowing from the west, carrying dense smoke, and occasionally flames, in through that door. When the door was first opened, the aircraft had been facing into the wind, and the exit had been clear. When the left front door was opened, this created an airflow from the front of the aircraft to the rear, and out through the right rear door, which likely contained the smoke to the rear of the aircraft. When the right overwing exit and the right front exit were opened, this flow was lost, and the entire cabin rapidly filled with smoke. The left rear exit remained closed.

Fire penetrated into the rear portion of the passenger cabin through the floor and along the left wall within one minute of the aircraft stopping. Accident investigators said that this quick penetration of fire into the cabin appeared "to conflict markedly with the air transport industry's expectations" for this type of fire, which at that time expected one to three minutes would be available for evacuation before the fire would be "in a position to directly threaten the occupants".

When firefighters determined that no more passengers would leave the aircraft unassisted, they entered the passenger cabin with fire hoses and attempted to extinguish the blaze inside the aircraft, but fighting the fire inside the aircraft had become futile and unsafe. One firefighter was slightly injured when an explosion threw him out of the door and down to the tarmac. The cause of the explosion was not determined, but heat-induced overpressure and rupture of an aerosol spray can or therapeutic oxygen cylinder are suspected.

=== Casualties ===
Toxic smoke and fire caused the deaths of 53 passengers and two cabin crew, 48 of them from smoke inhalation. Seventy-eight passengers and four crew escaped, with 15 people sustaining serious injuries. One passenger, a man rescued 33 minutes after the start of the fire, was found unconscious in the aisle, but died in the hospital six days later from injuries to his lungs and the resulting pneumonia.

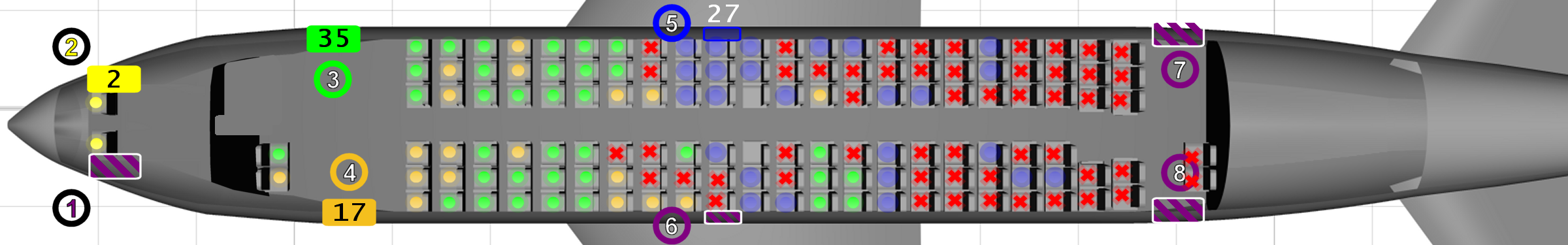
Colours in seats represent the exit taken by survivors assigned to those seats. Red crosses show fatalities.
Numbers shown at exits indicate the number of survivors who exited there. Hatching indicates no survivors exited there.

== Causes ==
The Air Accidents Investigation Branch (AAIB) report lists a cause for the accident and a separate cause for the fatalities, as well as four contributing factors:

1. The vulnerability of the wing tank access panels to impact
2. The lack of any effective provision for fighting major fires inside the aircraft cabin
3. The vulnerability of the aircraft hull to external fire
4. The extremely toxic nature of the emissions from the burning interior materials.

Chris Yates, an aviation analyst, later said of the accident, "This was very much a defining moment in the history of civil aviation safety. Specifically, the investigation found that a lot of materials inside the passenger cabin produced highly toxic fumes and required airlines to look again and re-invent the wheel, so to speak." It brought about industry-wide changes to the seating layout near emergency exits, fire-resistant seat covers, floor lighting, fire-resistant wall and ceiling panels, more fire extinguishers and clearer evacuation rules.

=== Accident ===
The subsequent investigation into the accident said that the No. 9 combustor can on the port engine ruptured, and a section of the can was ejected forcibly into an underwing fuel tank access panel. That panel was fractured, allowing fuel to spill onto hot combustion gases from the engine. The resulting fire developed catastrophically, primarily due to the orientation of the aircraft and the fire to the wind, "even though the wind was light".

=== Fatalities ===
The AAIB concluded, "the major cause of the fatalities was rapid incapacitation due to the inhalation of the dense toxic/irritant smoke atmosphere within the cabin, aggravated by evacuation delays caused by a forward right door malfunction and restricted access to the exits."

=== Previous engine repair ===
Records showed the engine in question, a Pratt & Whitney JT8D-15, had experienced previous cracks to the No. 9 combustor can that had been repaired in 1983 by fusion welding. The repair did not include solution heat treatment, which was a required procedure for this type of repair. The AAIB evaluated conflicting evidence on the effect of solution heat treatment and "considered that it would not have had a significant effect on the fatigue life of the can". The circumferential edges of the severed forward section of the No. 9 can coincided with some of the cracks that had been welded during that repair. Some of the fracture was in areas where no cracking had been seen at the time of the repair, and the fracture edges were severely damaged during the failure and the ensuing fire. Therefore, the AAIB could not conclude whether the quality of the repair had caused or contributed to the accident.

== Aftermath and commemoration ==
The Civil Aviation Authority was criticised for not implementing stringent safety regulations earlier.

The swift incursion of the fire into the fuselage and the layout of the aircraft impaired passenger evacuation, with areas such as the forward galley area becoming a particular bottleneck. Of those unable to escape, 48 died as a result of incapacitation and subsequently lethal toxic gas and smoke inhalation, some very close to the exits, with six dying from burns. The use of smoke hoods or misting systems was also examined.

The tragedy haunted captain Peter Terrington, who struggled with survivor's guilt for the remainder of his life and discussed the accident with his family "nearly every day". According to his wife Joan, he was "completely devastated that passengers had lost their lives", and always questioned whether he should have done more. He retired from flying at age 52, after 32 years as a pilot, becoming a counsellor for elderly people dealing with depression and loneliness. He continuously attended the annual memorial service at Manchester Airport for the flight's victims, remaining concerned that all lessons learned from the accident should be fully implemented in practice. Diagnosed with Parkinson's disease in his later years, Terrington died in February 2016 at age 70 following a brief illness.

In August 2018, a 5 m-high (16 ft) memorial commemorating the victims was unveiled near the accident site.

== Awards ==
The surviving cabin crew, Arthur Bradbury and Joanna Toff, and two members of the Manchester Airport Fire Service, Fireman Samuel Lyttle and Fireman Eric Arthur Westwood, were all awarded the Queen's Gallantry Medal, and the two flight attendants who died, Sharon Ford and Jacqui Urbanski, received the same award posthumously. Their collective citation stated in summary:

"Mr. Bradbury, Miss Ford, Miss Toff, and Mrs. Urbanski displayed coolness, outstanding courage and devotion to duty. They remained at their posts and saved many lives. Firemen Lyttle and Westwood also displayed outstanding bravery and disregard for their own safety when they mounted the wing to rescue passengers."

== Appearance in media ==
The accident was the subject of a 1985 World in Action investigation.

In 2010, this accident was reconstructed for a season-9 episode of Mayday (Air Crash Investigation) entitled "Panic on the Runway" or "Manchester Runway Disaster", showing computer simulations of the accident, as well as interviews with Captain Terrington, survivors, and the air crash investigators.

== See also ==
- Cameroon Airlines Flight 786
- Korean Air Flight 2708
- Emirates Flight 521
- British Airways Flight 2276
- Aeroflot Flight 1492
- American Airlines Flight 383 (2016)
- Delta Air Lines Flight 1288
- Pacific Western Airlines Flight 501
- Tibet Airlines Flight 9833
- Saudia Flight 163
