= TWA Flight 843 =

1992 aviation accident in New York

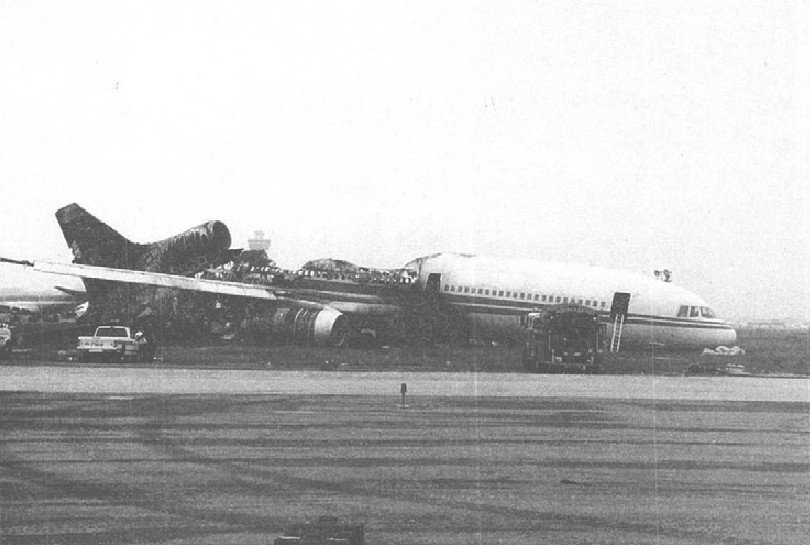
- Wreckage of the aircraft

Accident
- Date: July 30, 1992
- Summary: Instrument malfunction leading to rejected takeoff due to pilot error; maintenance error
- Site: John F. Kennedy International Airport, New York City, New York, United States; 40°37.7′N 73°46.3′W

Aircraft
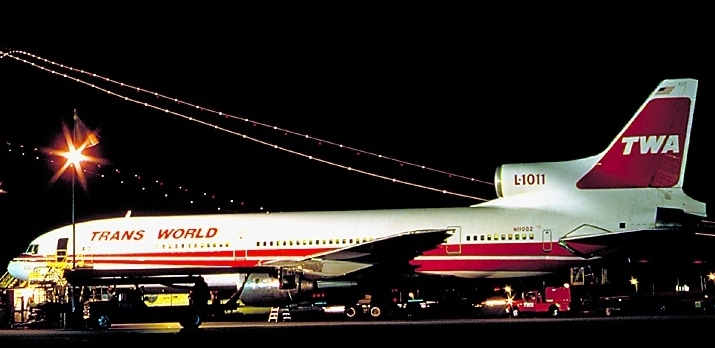
- N11002, the aircraft involved in the accident, seen in 1982
- Aircraft type: Lockheed L-1011 TriStar
- Operator: Trans World Airlines
- IATA flight No.: TW843
- ICAO flight No.: TWA843
- Call sign: TWA 843
- Registration: N11002
- Flight origin: John F. Kennedy International Airport, New York City, New York, United States
- Destination: San Francisco Airport, San Francisco, California, United States
- Occupants: 292
- Passengers: 280
- Crew: 12
- Fatalities: 0
- Injuries: 10
- Survivors: 292

TWA Flight 843 was a scheduled Trans World Airlines Lockheed L-1011 TriStar passenger flight that crashed after an aborted takeoff from John F. Kennedy International Airport (New York) to San Francisco International Airport (California) on July 30, 1992. Despite an intense fire after the crash, the crew was able to evacuate all 280 passengers from the aircraft. There was no loss of life, although the aircraft was destroyed by the fire.

== Background ==
=== Aircraft ===
The aircraft involved was a 20-year-old Lockheed L-1011 TriStar 1 that had first flown in 1972. Powered by three Rolls-Royce RB211-22B turbofan engines, it had logged a total of 49,662 hours of flying time in 19,659 takeoff and landing cycles. In 1975, the aircraft was previously involved in a near mid-air collision as Flight 37 with American Airlines Flight 182, a McDonnell Douglas DC-10-10.

=== Crew ===
In command was 54-year-old Captain William Shelby Kinkead, a veteran TWA pilot who had been with the airline since May 24, 1965, and had 20,149 flight hours, including 2,397 hours on the L-1011 TriStar. He had also previously served with the United States Air Force (USAF). His co-pilot was 53-year-old First Officer Dennis William Hergert, another veteran TWA pilot who had joined the airline on February 17, 1967, and had 15,242 flight hours with 5,183 of them on the L-1011 TriStar; 2,953 of which were as a first officer and 2,230 as a flight engineer. The flight engineer was 34-year-old Charles Edward Long, another former U.S. Air Force pilot who joined TWA on September 2, 1988. He was the least experienced member of the flight crew but still had sufficient flight experience, having clocked up a total of 3,922 flight hours, 2,266 of which were on the L-1011 TriStar. He was the head L-1011 Flight Engineer instructor in the NY domicile.

== Accident ==
At 17:16:12 EDT, Flight 843 pushed back from the gate at JFK and taxied to runway 13R. The flight was cleared for takeoff at 17:40:10 with First Officer Hergert as the pilot flying. The aircraft reached V_{1} (the speed at which takeoff can no longer be safely aborted) and V_{R} (rotation speed) at 17:40:58 and 17:41:03, respectively. According to the flight data recorder (FDR), the aircraft began to rotate at 158 knots (182 mph; 293 km/h). The first abnormality was indicated at 17:41:11 when the stick shaker activated. First Officer Hergert said, "Gettin' a stall. You got it.", transferring control of the aircraft back to Captain Kinkead. The Captain said "OK" and, believing he had sufficient runway available, retarded the thrust levers and aborted the takeoff just six seconds after rotation. At the time the takeoff was rejected, the aircraft was 14 feet (4.3 m) above the ground and traveling at a speed of 170 knots (200 mph; 310 km/h). The aircraft then slammed back onto the runway having reached a maximum speed of 181 knots (208 mph; 335 km/h) during the attempted takeoff. Air traffic control (ATC) warned Flight 843 of "numerous flames" coming from the engines.

In the NTSB report, "The Captain stated that he closed the thrust levers and put the airplane back on the runway. He applied full reverse thrust and maximum braking and the airplane began to decelerate, but not as fast as he had expected. He said that the brakes seemed to be losing their effectiveness and concluded that with approximately 1,500 feet [460 m] of runway remaining and the air speed still about 100 kts [120 mph; 190 km/h], he would not be able to stop before reaching the blast fence at the end of the runway."

Captain Kinkead turned the now-burning aircraft to the left and it went off the runway, finally stopping on an area of grass 296 feet (90 m) from runway 13R.

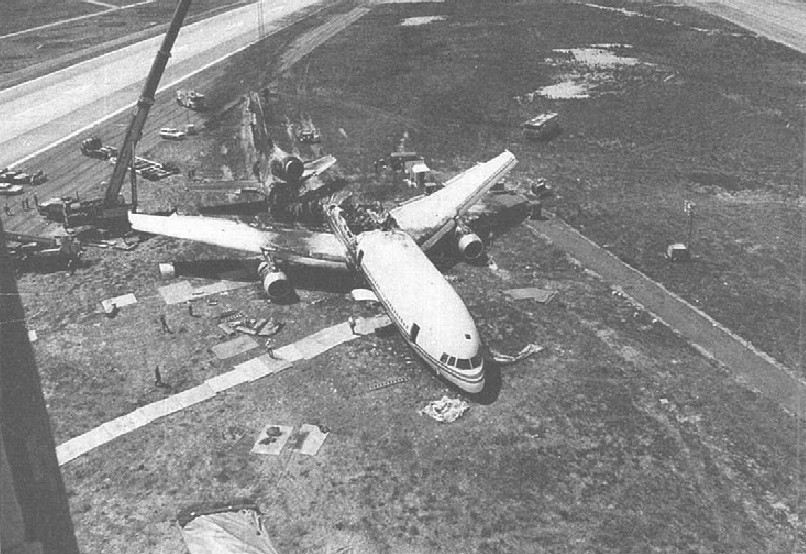
Another view of the aftermath of Flight 843

In addition to the nine flight attendants on board, there were five additional off-duty flight attendants who assisted in the evacuation. Although only three of eight exit doors were available for use, the evacuation was completed within two minutes, and the airport rescue and fire fighting teams' response was timely and adequate.

Oakland rapper Saafir was a passenger on the plane and injured his back while jumping to the ground. He eventually used a wheelchair due to the injury and died in part from complications from the injury 32 years later. Only 10 people (all of whom were passengers) were injured.

== Investigation ==
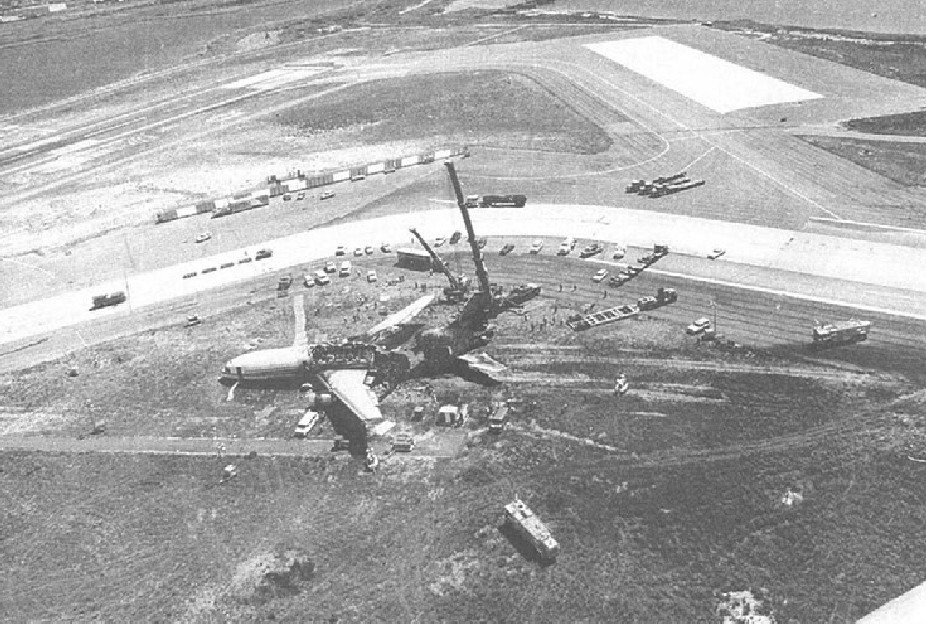
A complete overview over the wreckage of Flight 843

The captain told the National Transportation Safety Board (NTSB) that the aircraft's engines stalled after takeoff and felt that the aircraft was unsafe to fly as a result. In addition, two L-1011s had experienced engine fires in the past two years, the first at Boston in 1990, and the second occurring three months earlier at JFK. The Port Authority of New York and New Jersey stated that the fire on Flight 843 was the result of a fuel line rupturing, and that the aircraft leaked fuel on the runway. However, the NTSB did not find any evidence of a ruptured fuel line, nor was there any spilled fuel on the runway.

The NTSB attributed the crash to Human Factors (Crew Resource Management) and TWA training, procedural, maintenance and Quality Assurance failures. The Angle of Attack sensor (AOA) that had caused the erroneous stall warning had been found unserviceable on nine previous occasions, had received some checks and was then put back into the parts pool and fitted to the accident aircraft. It was found that it had an intermittent fault that was not able to be detected by the crew during pre-start procedures. According to the report, the first officer handed over control to the captain shortly after take-off at an altitude of 14 feet (4.3 m) without a clear transfer of command, due to the erroneous activation of the stick shaker stall warning device. The first officer makes an exclamation of surprise and then says "Gettin' a stall" and then, two seconds later, "You got it".

The captain said "OK" and simultaneously experienced a feeling of the aircraft 'sinking' that may have been due to the relaxation of the controls by the First Officer who believed they were stalling. (A normal procedure for a stall recovery is to lower the nose.) This may have had the effect of confirming that the aircraft was not climbing normally. In fact, the aircraft was performing normally and could have climbed safely away.

The NTSB found that contributing factors included TWA not requiring crew pre-briefings denoting responsibility each crew member had at what stages of the take off (these are standard procedures currently), nor were handover techniques clearly defined. It also noted that "The TWA procedure that allows the flight crews to initiate takeoffs without a predeparture briefing, does not adequately prepare the flight crews for coordination of potential abnormal circumstances during takeoff."

It goes on to say: "The Captain made a split second decision to abort the takeoff believing that there was sufficient runway remaining." The extremely hard landing caused damage to the right wing, spilling fuel that was then ingested into the engines and started the fire. The NTSB praised Captain Kinkead for bringing the aircraft to a safe stop, the rest of the crew (including the off-duty flight attendants) for safely evacuating the aircraft, and the airport rescue and fire fighting services for responding in a timely and adequate manner. At the same time however, the NTSB also criticized the flight crew for deciding to abort the takeoff after V_{R} and their response to the stick-shaker activation, both of which were inappropriate.

== See also ==
- Aviation accidents and incidents
- 2008 South Carolina Learjet 60 crash, another high-speed aborted take-off
- Kenya Airways Flight 431, another accident caused by a false stall warning
- Tower Air Flight 41, another accident that occurred during take-off from JFK
