= Korean Air Flight 2708 =

2016 aviation accident in Tokyo, Japan

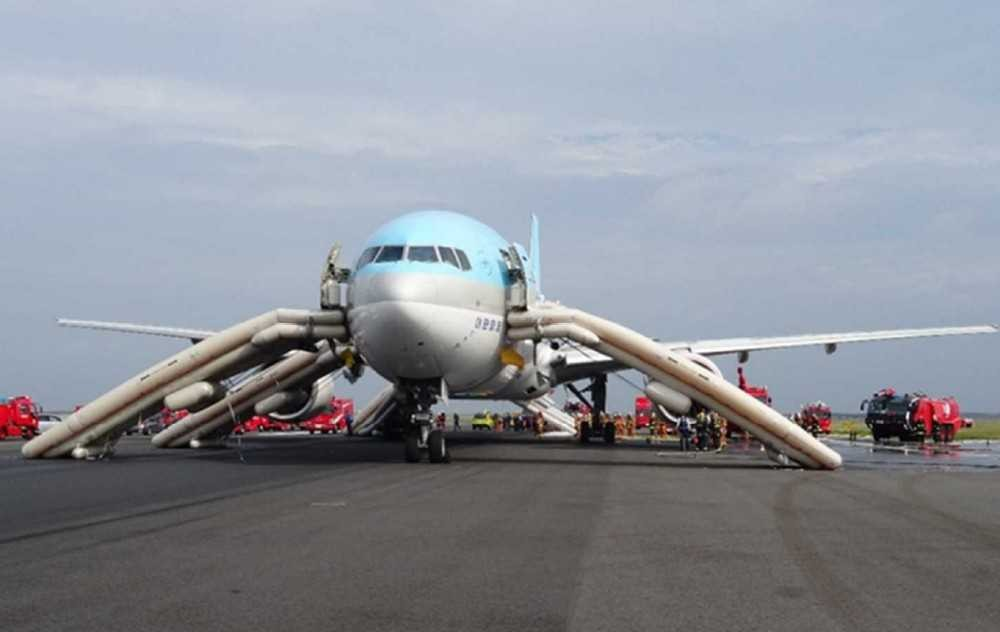
- The aircraft involved, after the evacuation via the emergency slides

Accident
- Date: 27 May 2016
- Summary: Uncontained engine failure due to maintenance error and pilot error leading to rejected takeoff
- Site: Haneda Airport, Tokyo, Japan

Aircraft
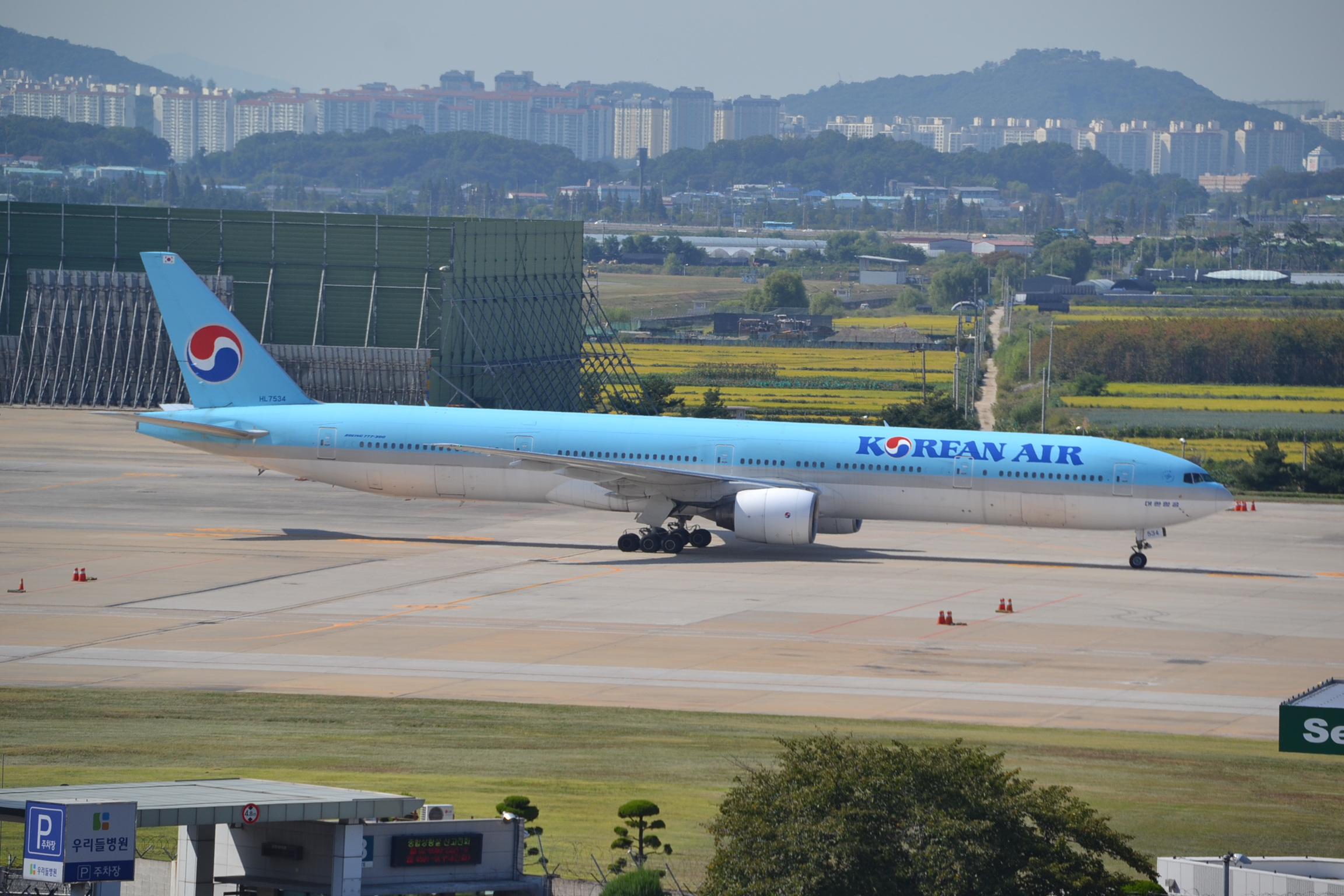
- HL7534, the aircraft involved in the accident, seen in 2015
- Aircraft type: Boeing 777-3B5
- Operator: Korean Air
- IATA flight No.: KE2708
- ICAO flight No.: KAL2708
- Call sign: KOREAN AIR 2708
- Registration: HL7534
- Flight origin: Haneda Airport, Tokyo, Japan
- Destination: Gimpo Airport, Seoul, South Korea
- Occupants: 319
- Passengers: 302
- Crew: 17
- Fatalities: 0
- Injuries: 12
- Survivors: 319

Korean Air Flight 2708 was a scheduled international flight from Haneda Airport in Tokyo to Seoul's Gimpo International Airport. On 27 May 2016, the Boeing 777 operating the flight was accelerating for take off when its left engine suffered an uncontained failure and a substantial fire ensued. The crew aborted the take-off, and after the aircraft came to a stop the fire was extinguished by the airport emergency services. All 319 passengers and crew were evacuated; 12 occupants received minor injuries. The accident was attributed to poor maintenance standards and failure of the crew to carry out the emergency procedures correctly.

== Aircraft and crew ==
The aircraft operating Flight 2708 was a Boeing 777-3B5 (Note: The aircraft is a Boeing 777-300 model; Boeing assigns a unique customer code for each company that buys one of its aircraft, which is applied as a suffix in the model number at the time the aircraft is built. The code for Korean Air is "B5", hence "777-3B5".) equipped with two Pratt & Whitney PW4000 engines, registered HL7534, serial number 27950. The 120th Boeing 777 produced, it first flew on 4 February 1998, and was delivered new to Korean Air on 28 December 1999.

The 49-year-old captain had logged a total of 10,410 flight hours, including 3,205 hours on the Boeing 777. The 41-year-old first officer had 5,788 hours with 2,531 of them on the Boeing 777.

== Accident ==
As the aircraft was taking off from Runway 34R at Tokyo Haneda, the pilots heard a loud bang from the left. The pilots aborted the takeoff and the aircraft came to a stop, whereupon an evacuation commenced. All the occupants escaped, but 12 occupants received minor injuries and were taken to a hospital near the airport. Incoming flights were diverted to Tokyo's Narita International Airport and to Osaka. The airport firefighters quickly extinguished the fire. The aircraft reportedly travelled 700 metres down the runway before coming to a stop, with engine-parts scattered 600 metres from the point at which the aircraft began accelerating and tire-marks 700 metres from that point.

== Impact ==
Because of the incident, all four runways of Haneda Airport was closed, affecting a total of at least 36,000 passengers. Among those affected was Toshinao Nakagawa, who was supposed to attend US President Barack Obama's speech at the Hiroshima Peace Memorial Museum as one of the elected officials of Hiroshima Prefecture. Nakagawa was unable to make the trip due to his flight being cancelled as a result of this accident.

== Investigation ==
The Japan Transport Safety Board (JTSB), the South Korean Aviation and Railway Accident Investigation Board (ARAIB), and the United States National Transportation Safety Board (NTSB) all investigated the accident, with assistance from experts in South Korea and the United States. On 30 May 2016, investigators revealed that the low-pressure turbine blades on the left (number one) Pratt & Whitney PW4090 engine had "shattered", with fragments piercing the engine cover, with fragments subsequently found on the runway. The engine's high-pressure turbine blades and high-pressure compressor were intact and free of abnormalities, and investigators found no evidence of a bird strike.

The aircraft was repaired and returned to service with Korean Air on 3 June 2016.

=== Final report ===
The final JTSB investigative report, released on 26 July 2018, discussed a significant number of problems related to the failure and the response of the crew and passengers to it. These included poor maintenance standards that overlooked a crack growing in the LP turbine disc in the engine created by metal fatigue that eventually failed, the failure of the crew to locate the list of emergency procedures for use in such an emergency, beginning evacuation of the aircraft whilst the engines were still running meaning there was a risk of passengers being blown away by the engines, and passengers ignoring instructions to leave luggage behind when using the evacuation slides risking piercing of the slides. As a result of the fire, the FAA issued an Airworthiness Directive mandating inspection of engines of the type involved in the fire to evaluate the condition of the components which failed on Flight 2708.

== See also ==
- Emirates Flight 521, another accident involving the Boeing 777-300 that occurred in the same year
- British Airways Flight 2276
- United Airlines Flight 328
- United Airlines Flight 1175
- American Airlines Flight 383 (2016)
- British Airtours Flight 28M
- Tibet Airlines Flight 9833
- Red Air Flight 203
