= British Airways Flight 2276 =

2015 aircraft accident in Nevada

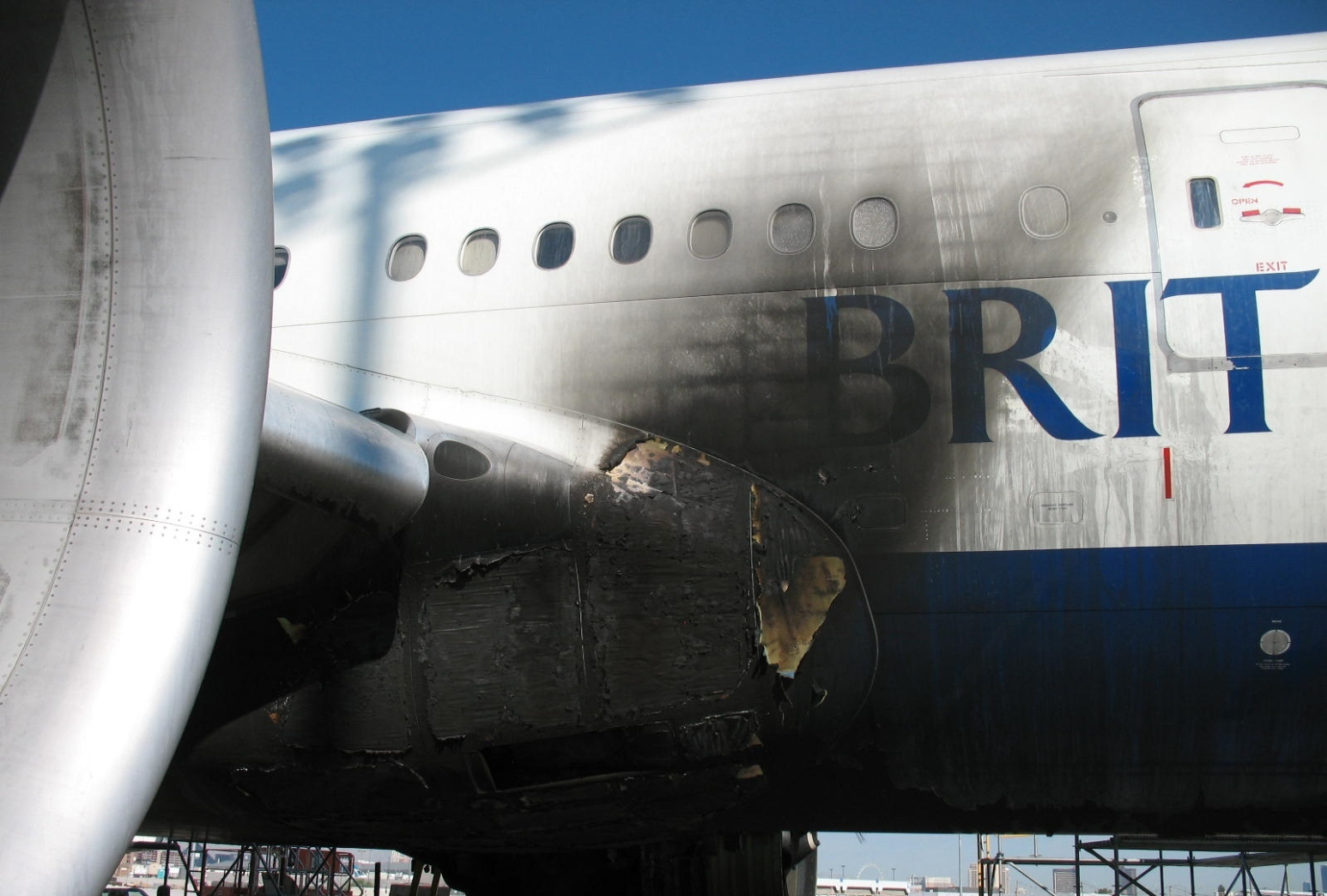
- Fire damage to the aircraft

Accident
- Date: 8 September 2015
- Summary: Fire due to uncontained failure of engine no. 1 leading to rejected takeoff
- Site: McCarran International Airport, Las Vegas, Nevada, United States; 36°4′34.67″N 115°9′8.96″W

Aircraft
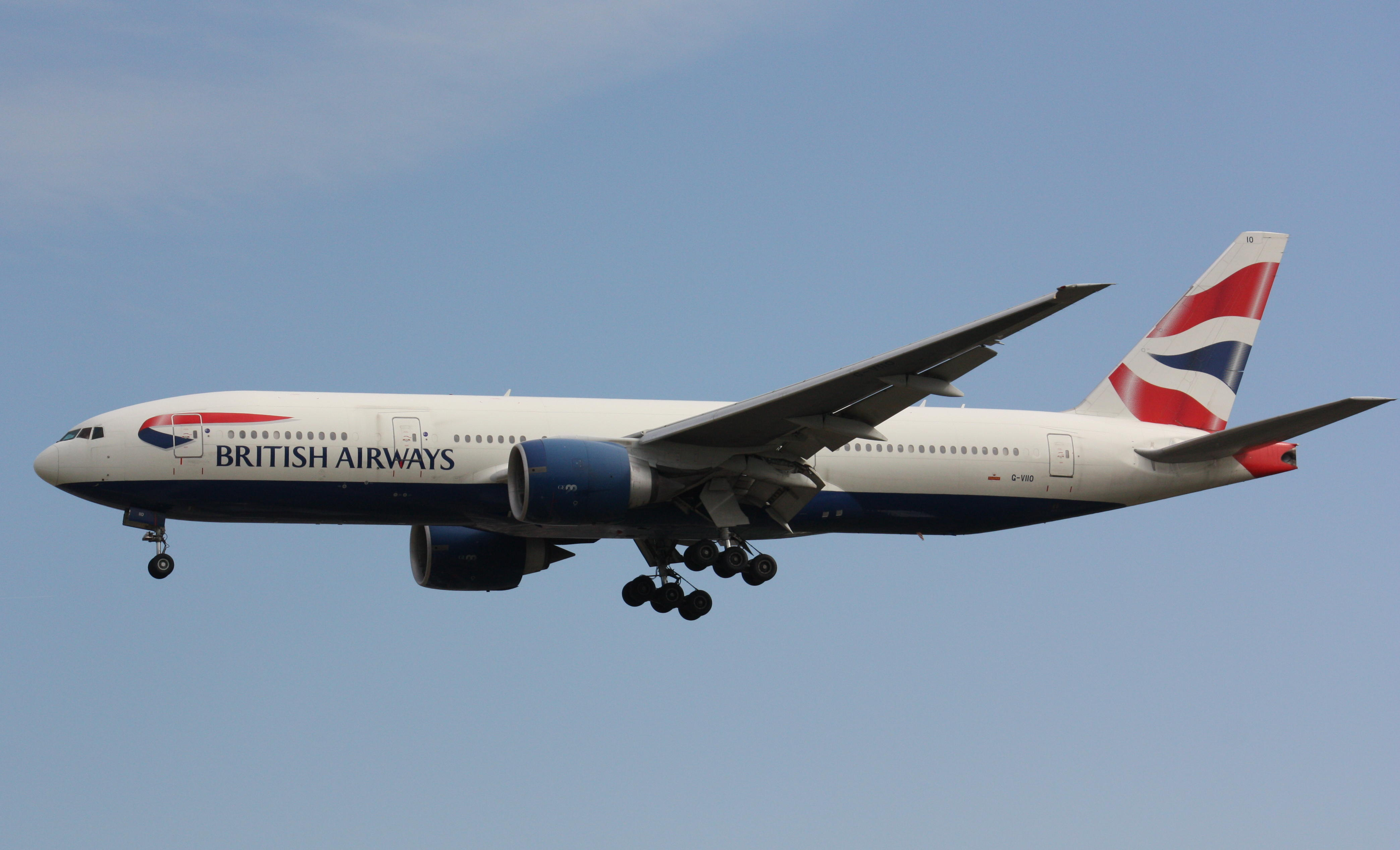
- G-VIIO, the aircraft involved in the accident, pictured in 2010
- Aircraft type: Boeing 777-236ER
- Aircraft name: Chelsea Rose
- Operator: British Airways
- IATA flight No.: BA2276
- ICAO flight No.: BAW2276
- Call sign: SPEEDBIRD 2276
- Registration: G-VIIO
- Flight origin: McCarran International Airport, Las Vegas, Nevada, United States
- Destination: Gatwick Airport, Crawley, England
- Occupants: 170
- Passengers: 157
- Crew: 13
- Fatalities: 0
- Injuries: 20
- Survivors: 170

British Airways Flight 2276 was a scheduled international passenger flight from Las Vegas, Nevada, to London Gatwick Airport, England. On 8 September 2015, the Boeing 777 operating the flight suffered an uncontained engine failure and fire in the left (#1) GE90 engine during take-off from Las Vegas-McCarran International Airport, prompting an aborted take-off and the evacuation of all passengers and crew. All 170 people on board survived, but 20 occupants were injured.

The aircraft, which suffered moderate damage to a section of its forward fuselage as of a result of the vigorous fire, was repaired and returned to commercial passenger service in March 2016. The fire was caused by metal fatigue in a compressor disk, leading to detachment of the main fuel supply line.

== Accident ==
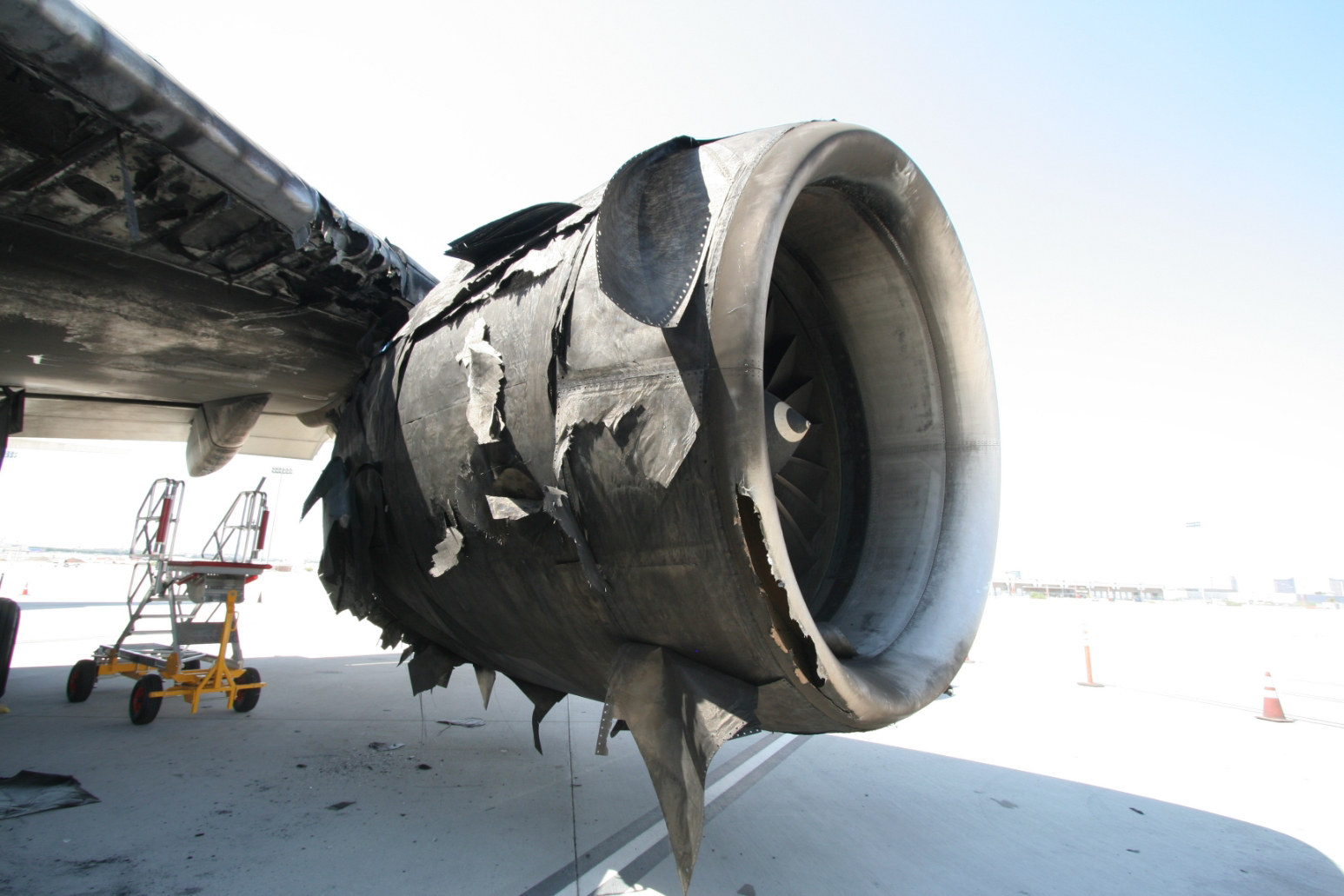
Uncontained failure of the left-side engine

The aircraft left Terminal 3, Gate E3, at 15:53 local time, and began its take-off from Runway 07L at 16:12 where the accident occurred.

After noticing what the pilot later described as a "catastrophic failure of the engine" well before take-off speed, the flight crew aborted the take-off by using the aircraft's brakes and ordered an evacuation of the aircraft. All 170 passengers and crew escaped. One occupant was seriously injured, and others sustained minor injuries. The aircraft had reached a speed (Note: Airspeed; with a slight wind recorded, meaning the groundspeed, along the runway, will have been very slightly less.) of approximately 90 miles per hour (78 kn; 140 km/h) when the decision to abort was made; far below the takeoff decision speed of the aircraft, which for this flight was about 170 mph. (Note: 149 knots (171 mph; 276 km/h))

The airport's emergency services extinguished the fire within five minutes of the mayday call. Twenty people were injured, mostly from sliding down the escape chutes; one seriously; casualties were treated at Sunrise Hospital & Medical Center. The fire caused a large hole in the cargo hold and damage to the engine.

The Federal Aviation Administration (FAA) indicated the fire was caused by failure of the left General Electric GE90 engine, one of two fitted on the aircraft. There was a slight left-to-right wind across the runway, (Note: The NTSB Report records wind direction 020 at 6kn, which implies a gentle crosswind, about 4 knots (4.6 mph; 7.4 km/h), on runway 07 (heading approx. 070).) causing the fire to be blown towards the fuselage; the aircraft sustained localised, but major, structural damage as a result. The aircraft was equipped with suppression systems, though the systems did not extinguish the fire.

The runway, one of four, was closed, and several inbound flights were cancelled.

== Aircraft and crew ==
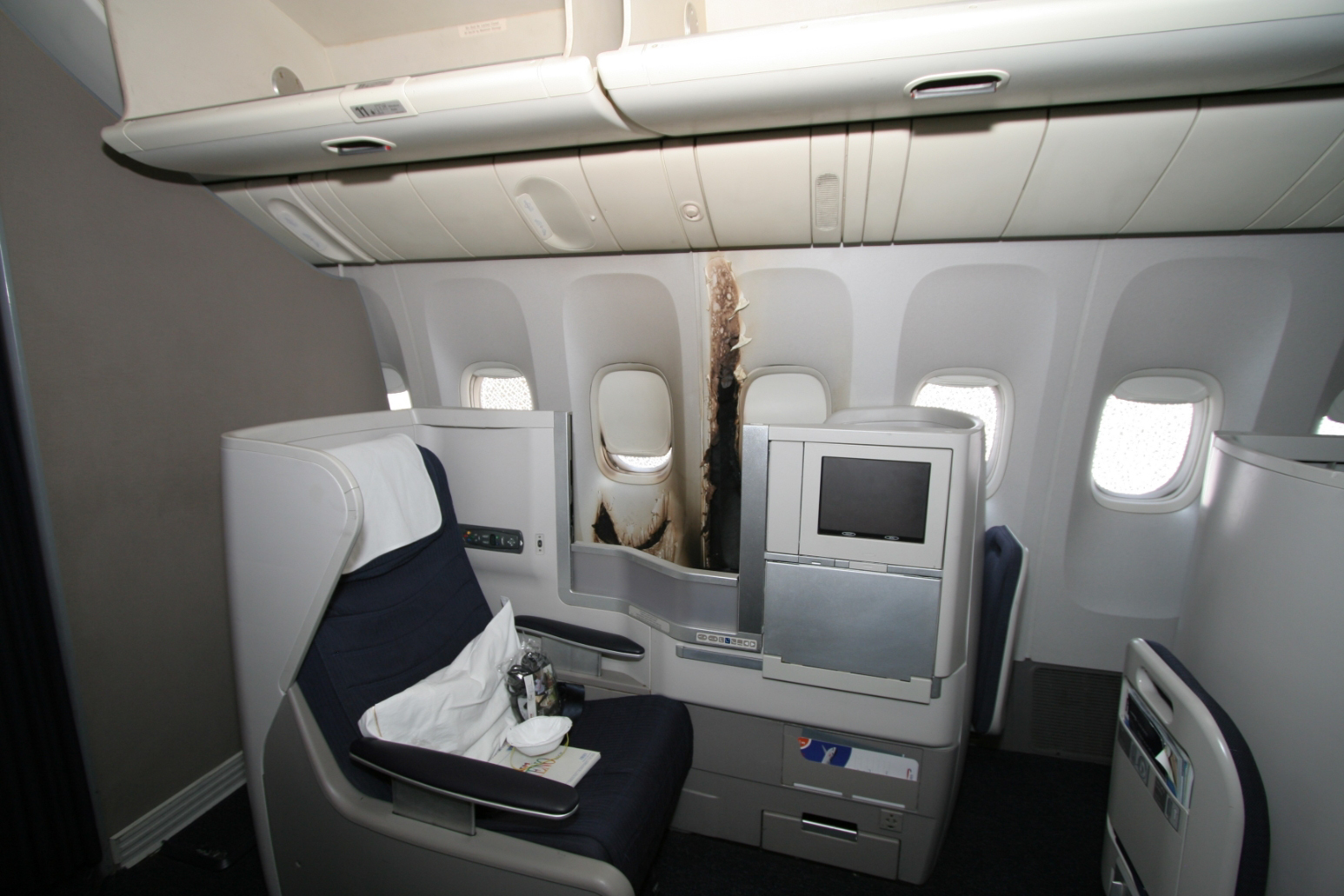
The aircraft's business class section with interior panels damaged by the fire

The aircraft involved was a Boeing 777-236ER (Note: The aircraft was a Boeing 777-200 model; Boeing assigns a unique code for each company that buys one of its aircraft, which is applied as a suffix to the model number at the time the aircraft is built, hence "777-236" designates a 777-200 built for British Airways (customer code 36).), s/n 29320, registered as G-VIIO. At the time of the accident, the aircraft was 16 years old; it had been delivered new to British Airways on 26 January 1999.

The captain was 63-year-old Chris Henkey, who had been with British Airways since 1973 and received his type rating on the Boeing 777 in 1999. He had 30,000 flight hours, including 12,000 hours on the Boeing 777. Flight 2276 was intended to be his penultimate flight before his retirement (which was intended to occur in a week), but following the accident he decided that Flight 2276 would be his final flight.

The first officer, 30-year-old Ian Callaghan, joined the airline in 2006, receiving his type rating on the Boeing 777 in 2011, and had 6,400 flight hours, with 3,100 hours on the Boeing 777. 45-year-old relief pilot Kevin Hillyer was also on board. He had been with British Airways since 1997 and had been type rated on the Boeing 777 since 2001. The relief pilot had 14,000 flight hours, and like captain Henkey, was also well experienced on the Boeing 777 having logged 10,000 hours on it. He was a first officer at the time of the accident.

== Repair ==
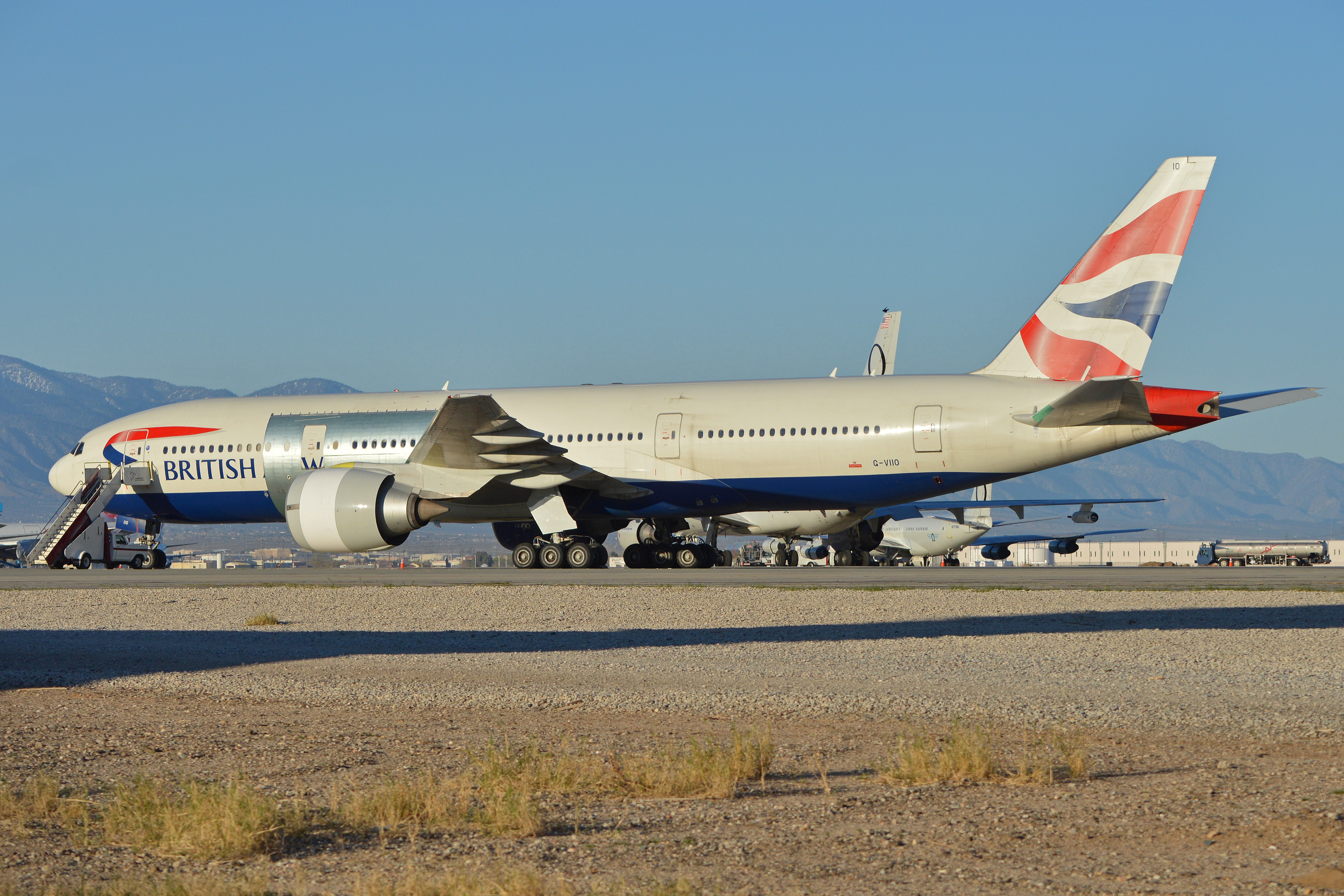
The aircraft at Victorville in February 2016 after being repaired, showing the unpainted fuselage skin and engine cowling

In December 2015, British Airways announced that a team of engineers from Boeing had assessed the aircraft and determined the damage was limited and suitable for repair. As a result, it was announced that the aircraft would be repaired and returned to service.

A team from Boeing completed initial repairs in February 2016. Airworthiness tests were conducted on the aircraft on 25 February 2016 and on 26 February the aircraft made its departure from Las Vegas McCarran airport at 1:33 p.m. and was flown to Victorville, arriving at 3:06 p.m. It was repainted there and further repairs and maintenance work were performed. The aircraft was then flown to British Airways Maintenance Cardiff in Cardiff on 15 March for a routine C check. Finally, it returned to its London Gatwick base and resumed passenger service on 24 March.

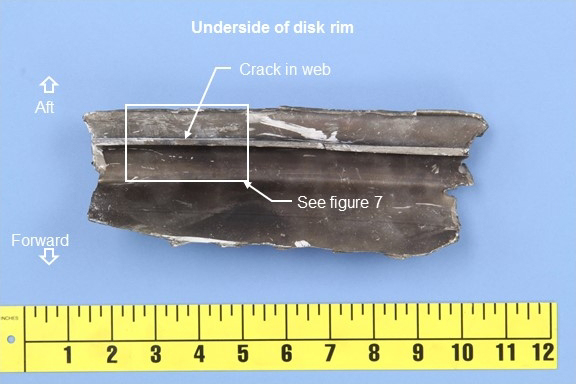
The failed compressor blade

== Investigation ==
The National Transportation Safety Board (NTSB), the American air accident investigative body, dispatched four investigators to the site the day after the accident. As well as FAA, Boeing and General Electric involvement, the British Air Accidents Investigation Branch had a representative and that representative appointed "British Airways and the UK Civil Aviation Authority as technical advisors". Initial NTSB findings were that an uncontained engine failure had occurred and that the "left engine and pylon, left fuselage structure and inboard left wing airplane were substantially damaged by the fire". On 6 October 2015, the NTSB issued an update stating that the accident was traced to the failure of the "stage 8–10 spool in the high-pressure compressor section...liberating fragments that breached the engine case and cowling". The NTSB released their final report 2 years and 10 months later. The cause of the accident was determined as:

The failure of the left engine high-pressure compressor (HPC) stage 8-10 spool, which caused the main fuel supply line to become detached from the engine main fuel pump and release fuel, resulting in a fire on the left side of the airplane. The HPC stage 8-10 spool failed due to a sustained-peak low-cycle fatigue crack that initiated in the web of the stage 8 disk; the cause of the crack initiation could not be identified by physical inspection and stress and lifing analysis. Contributing to this accident was the lack of inspection procedures for the stage 8 disk web.

— Final report, National Transportation Safety Board

== See also ==
- American Airlines Flight 383 (2016) – A Boeing 767-300ER which caught fire at O'Hare Airport.
- Korean Air Flight 2708 – Another Boeing 777 that experienced an engine fire at Haneda Airport.
- BOAC Flight 712
- 1985 Manchester Airport disaster
- TWA Flight 843
- Saudia Flight 163
- United Airlines Flight 328 and United Airlines Flight 1175, other Boeing 777s that suffered uncontained engine failures.
- Tibet Airlines Flight 9833
