= American Airlines Flight 383 (2016) =

2016 aviation accident in the United States

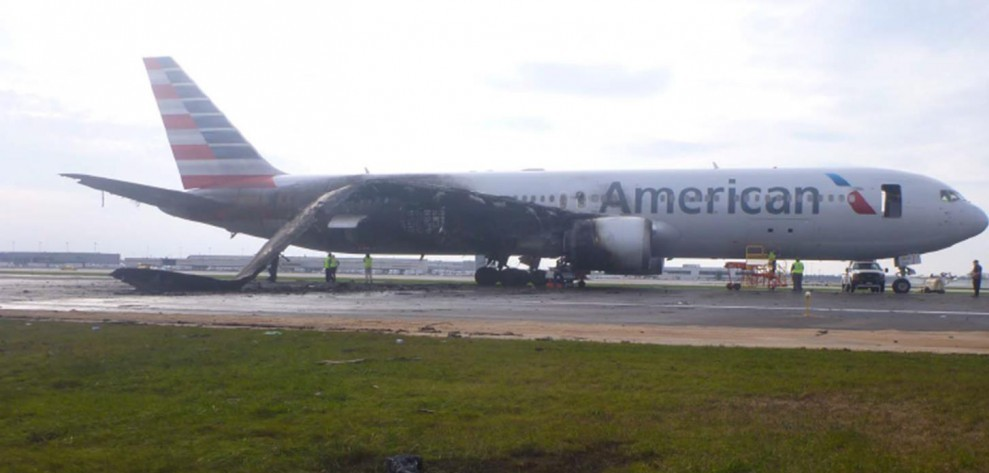
- The aftermath of Flight 383

Accident
- Date: October 28, 2016
- Summary: Uncontained engine failure of engine no. 2 during takeoff leading to fire
- Site: O'Hare International Airport, Chicago, Illinois, United States; 41.966°N 87.901°W

Aircraft
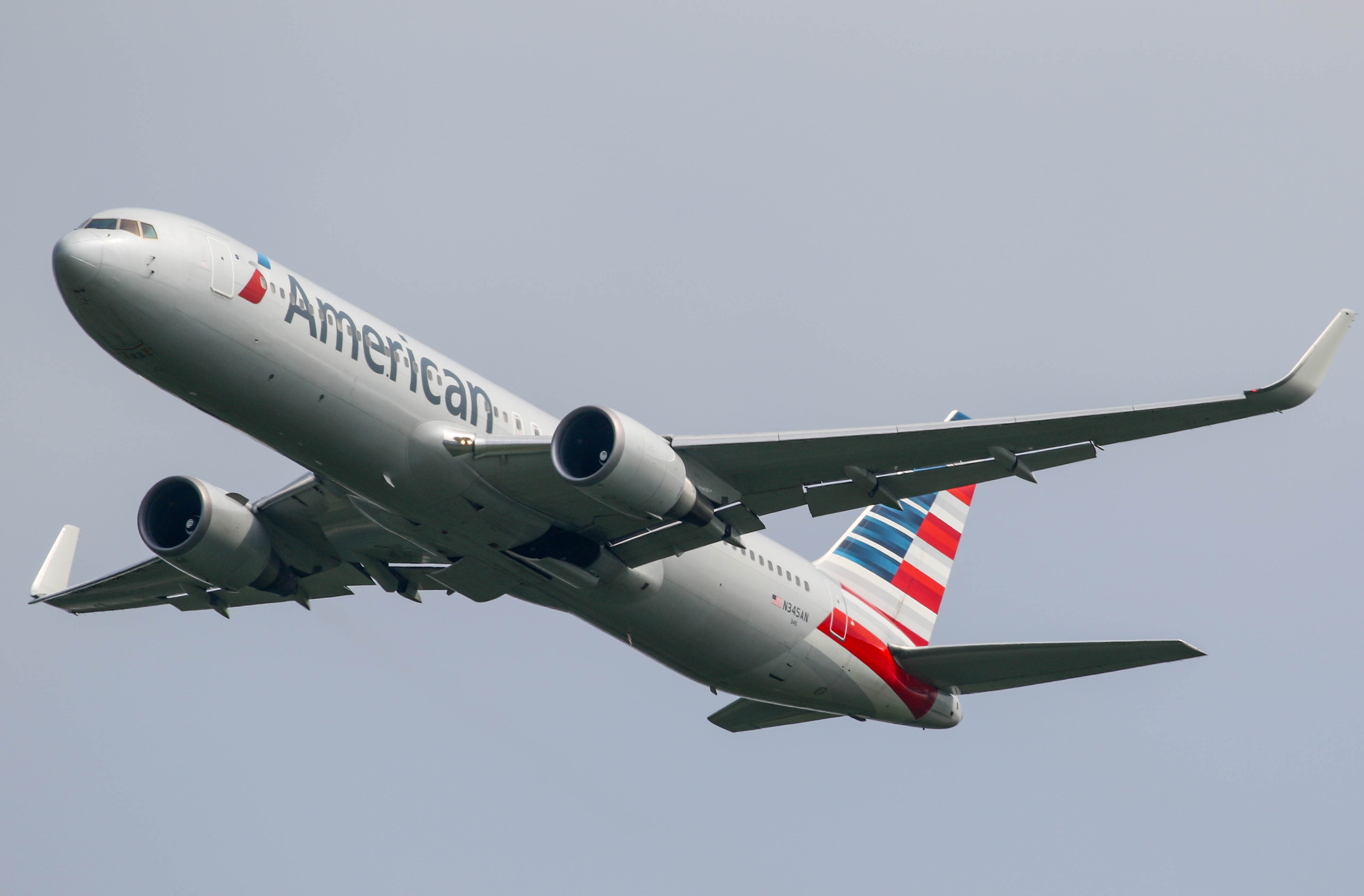
- N345AN, the aircraft involved, on June 9, 2016
- Aircraft type: Boeing 767-323(ER) (Note: The aircraft was a Boeing 767-300(ER) model, with "ER" denoting the Extended Range variant. Boeing assigns a unique code for each company that buys one of its aircraft, which is applied as a suffix to the model number at the time the aircraft is built, hence "767-323(ER)" designates a 767-300(ER) built for American Airlines (customer code 23).)
- Operator: American Airlines
- IATA flight No.: AA383
- ICAO flight No.: AAL383
- Call sign: AMERICAN 383
- Registration: N345AN
- Flight origin: O'Hare International Airport, Chicago, Illinois, United States
- Destination: Miami International Airport, Miami, Florida, United States
- Occupants: 170
- Passengers: 161
- Crew: 9
- Fatalities: 0
- Injuries: 21 (20 passengers, 1 crew member)
- Survivors: 170

American Airlines Flight 383 was a scheduled domestic passenger flight from O'Hare International Airport in Chicago, Illinois to Miami International Airport. On October 28, 2016, the Boeing 767 operating the flight suffered an uncontained engine failure on the second engine during takeoff that ignited a fire. The crew rejected the takeoff and evacuated everyone on board, with 21 occupants being injured—there were no fatalities. The aircraft was damaged beyond repair, making this accident the 17th hull loss of a Boeing 767.

The accident was caused by the rupture of a disk in the starboard engine, with one fragment piercing the fuel tank in the wing. The investigation revealed the need for more stringent directives for ultrasonic inspection of engine components.

== Accident ==
On October 28, 2016, the Boeing 767-300ER operating the flight (registered N345AN) was accelerating for takeoff on runway 28R when the aircraft's right engine suffered an uncontained failure that led to a severe fire. The crew managed to abort the takeoff and evacuate everyone on board, while emergency services extinguished the fire. Twenty-one people were injured, and the aircraft was substantially damaged, written off, and stored.

The right engine had suffered a sudden rupture of the stage-2 disk while operating at takeoff power. The disk separated into two pieces, the smaller of which pierced the wing's fuel tank and then flew 2,935 feet (895 m), falling through the roof of a United Parcel Service (UPS) facility and coming to rest on the building's floor. No one was injured in the UPS building.

== Background ==
=== Aircraft ===
The aircraft, a 13-year-old Boeing 767-323(ER) powered by two General Electric CF6-80C2B6 engines, registration number N345AN, was delivered to American Airlines in 2003.

=== Crew ===
In command was 61-year-old Captain Anthony Kochenash. He had been flying with American Airlines since May 2001 and previously flown with TWA from January 1986 to April 2001. Kochenash also served with the United States Air Force from May 1978 to October 1985, flying both the Boeing KC-135 and the CT-39. He had 17,400 flight hours, including 4,000 hours on the Boeing 767. His co-pilot was 57-year-old First Officer David Ditzel. Like the captain, he had also been working for American Airlines since May 2001 and had previously flown with TWA from December 1995 to April 2001. He had 22,000 flight hours, with 1,600 of them on the Boeing 767.

== Fire ==
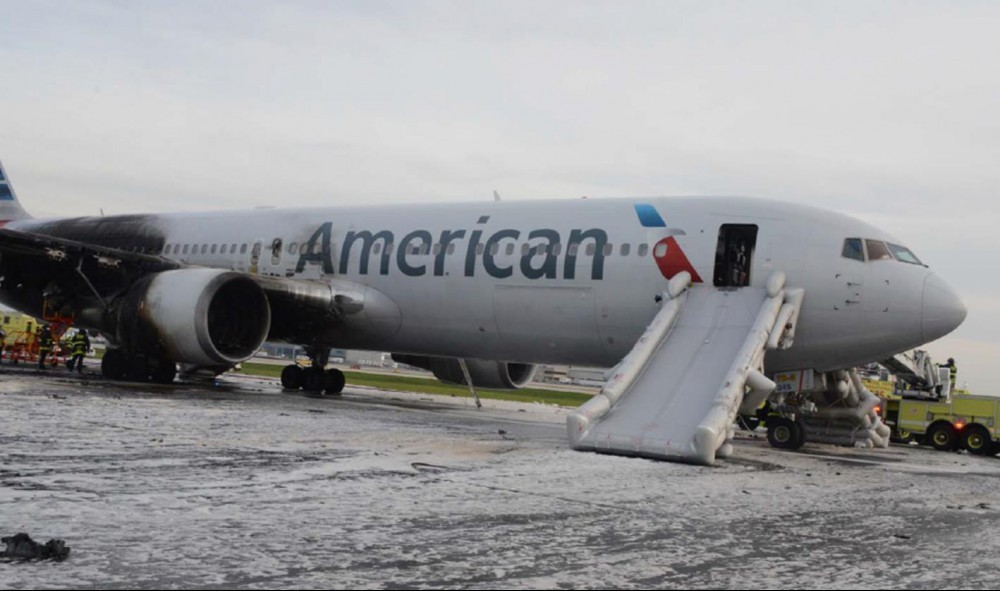
The aircraft, shortly after its complete evacuation.

At 14:30 (2:30 PM) Central Daylight Time (CDT), Flight 383 was cleared for takeoff on runway 28R. The aircraft commenced its takeoff roll one minute later with Captain Kochenash as the pilot flying and First Officer Ditzel as the pilot monitoring. At 14:31:32, Ditzel called out "eighty knots," however, 11 seconds after this callout was made, the cockpit voice recorder (CVR) recorded a loud noise. The aircraft began to veer right and Kochenash rejected the takeoff.

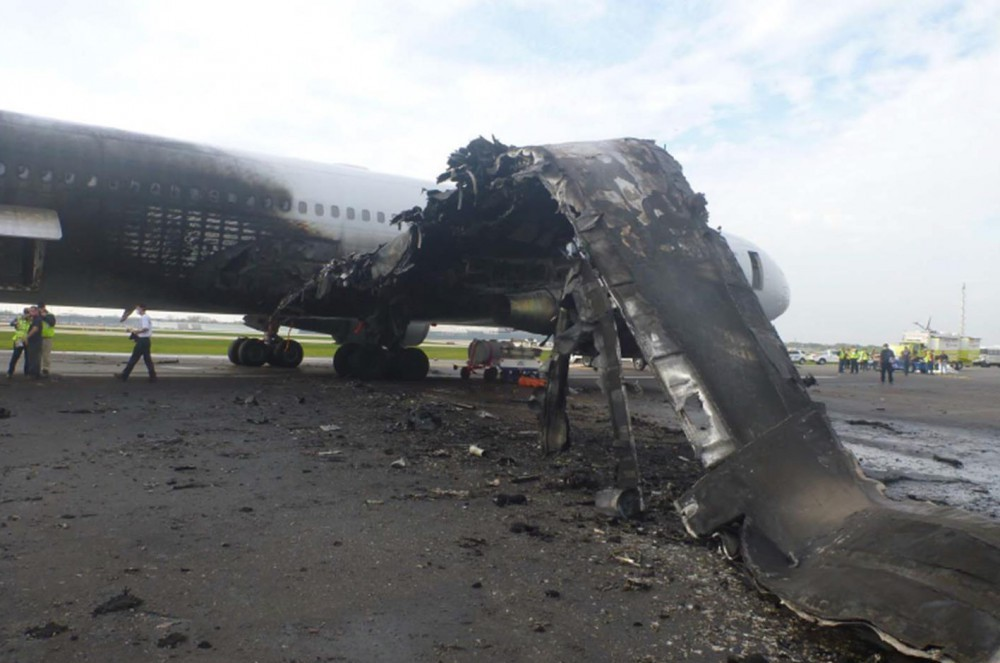
The damage to the aircraft after the fire was extinguished

Ditzel radioed to the control tower, "American three eighty-three heavy stopping on the runway." The controller had already noticed the engine failure and responded "roger roger. Fire," advising the crew of the situation. Ditzel asked the tower controller, "do you see any smoke or fire?" The controller said, "yeah fire off the right-wing." He then ordered the fire trucks to be sent to the aircraft. Kochenash called for the engine fire checklist, the right engine was shut off, and its fire extinguisher was activated. Kochenash then called for the evacuation checklist, during which the flight attendants had already initiated an evacuation, despite the command not having been given (which is not required). After shutting down the left engine, Kochenash finally gave the evacuation command and sounded the evacuation alarm. The first emergency exit (the left overwing window exit) was opened 8 to 12 seconds after the aircraft stopped. After completing the evacuation checklist, the pilots then evacuated.

The right side of the fuselage suffered considerable fire damage. The right wing collapsed about midway along its length. American subsequently declared the aircraft a hull loss. The accident marks the 17th hull loss of a Boeing 767.

== Investigation and recommendations ==
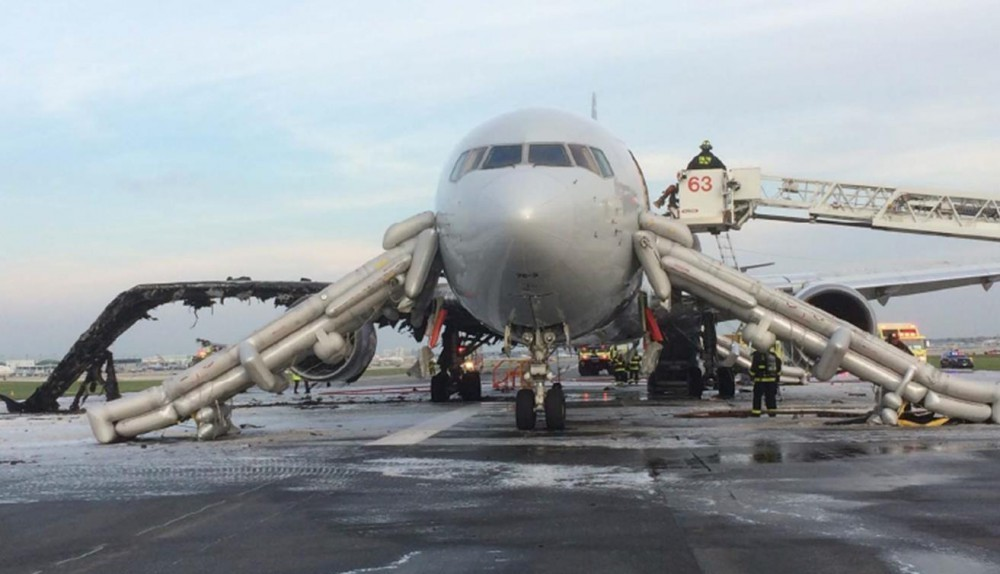
Another angle of the aftermath of Flight 383

In July 2017, GE Aviation issued a Service Bulletin recommending that airlines perform regular inspections of first- and second-stage disks of all CF6 engines built before 2000.

On January 30, 2018, the National Transportation Safety Board (NTSB) issued its final report on the accident involving American 383. It traced the origin of the failure in disk 2 to a "discrete dirty white spot" that in the Board's judgement would have been undetectable, at manufacture or subsequent inspection, with the inspection techniques available. The NTSB made several safety recommendations as a result, not only with regards to the engine and aircraft but also to issues raised by the evacuation.

=== Engine inspections ===
Although the CF6 had been the subject of multiple Federal Aviation Administration (FAA) airworthiness directives, they had not focused on the larger, relatively slower Stage 1 disks at the front of the engine, made with a nickel alloy. Although the FAA had signaled its intent to issue an order for ultrasonic inspections of CF6-80s in September 2017, the NTSB called for such inspections to be extended to all large commercial aircraft engine models in service. On August 30, 2018, the FAA issued an airworthiness directive that required airlines to perform ongoing ultrasonic inspections for cracks in stage 1 and stage 2 disks on engines like those involved in Flight 383. The NTSB also called for increased design precautions, based on multiple uncontained disk ruptures, to be continually integrated into all commercial aircraft design, especially of the wings and fuel tanks; the FAA did not immediately respond to that recommendation.

=== Procedures ===
The Board recommended separate engine fire checklists for ground vs. in-flight operation; the checklist used did not so differentiate, and so did not include a separate step where, if the plane was on the ground, the other engine should be stopped to allow evacuation. As a result, a passenger evacuating using the left overwing exit was the only person seriously injured after being knocked to the ground by exhaust from the still-operating engine. In addition, the checklist provided to the pilots called for discharge of only one of the two fire extinguisher bottles in the affected engine, followed by a wait of 30 seconds to judge its effectiveness; however, other checklists specific to ground operations call for immediate use of both bottles in order to create a safer environment for evacuation of the aircraft.

The Board also faulted communication efforts among the crew, including the inability of flight attendants to successfully operate the interphone (which differed from the model used in training) and the failure of the flight crew to keep attendants informed of their intention to evacuate. The Board also called for research into countermeasures against passengers evacuating with carry-on luggage despite being specifically instructed not to do so by crew.

== See also ==
- Dynamic Airways Flight 405 - Similar accident on same family of aircraft
- British Airways Flight 2276
- Korean Air Flight 2708
- British Airtours Flight 28M - Similar accident where an engine fire started on take off
- United Airlines Flight 328
- Southwest Airlines Flight 1380
- Pacific Western Airlines Flight 501
- United Airlines Flight 1175
