= Pacific Western Airlines Flight 501 =

1984 aviation accident in Canada

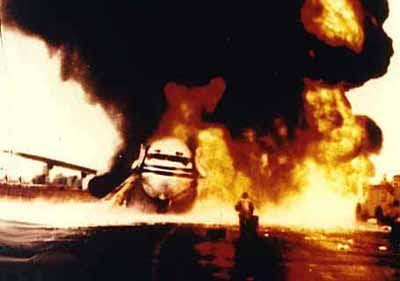
- The aircraft on fire after being evacuated

Accident
- Date: 22 March 1984
- Summary: Fire on the ground caused by uncontained engine failure on takeoff
- Site: Calgary International Airport, Calgary, Alberta, Canada; 51.1225°N 114.0130°W

Aircraft
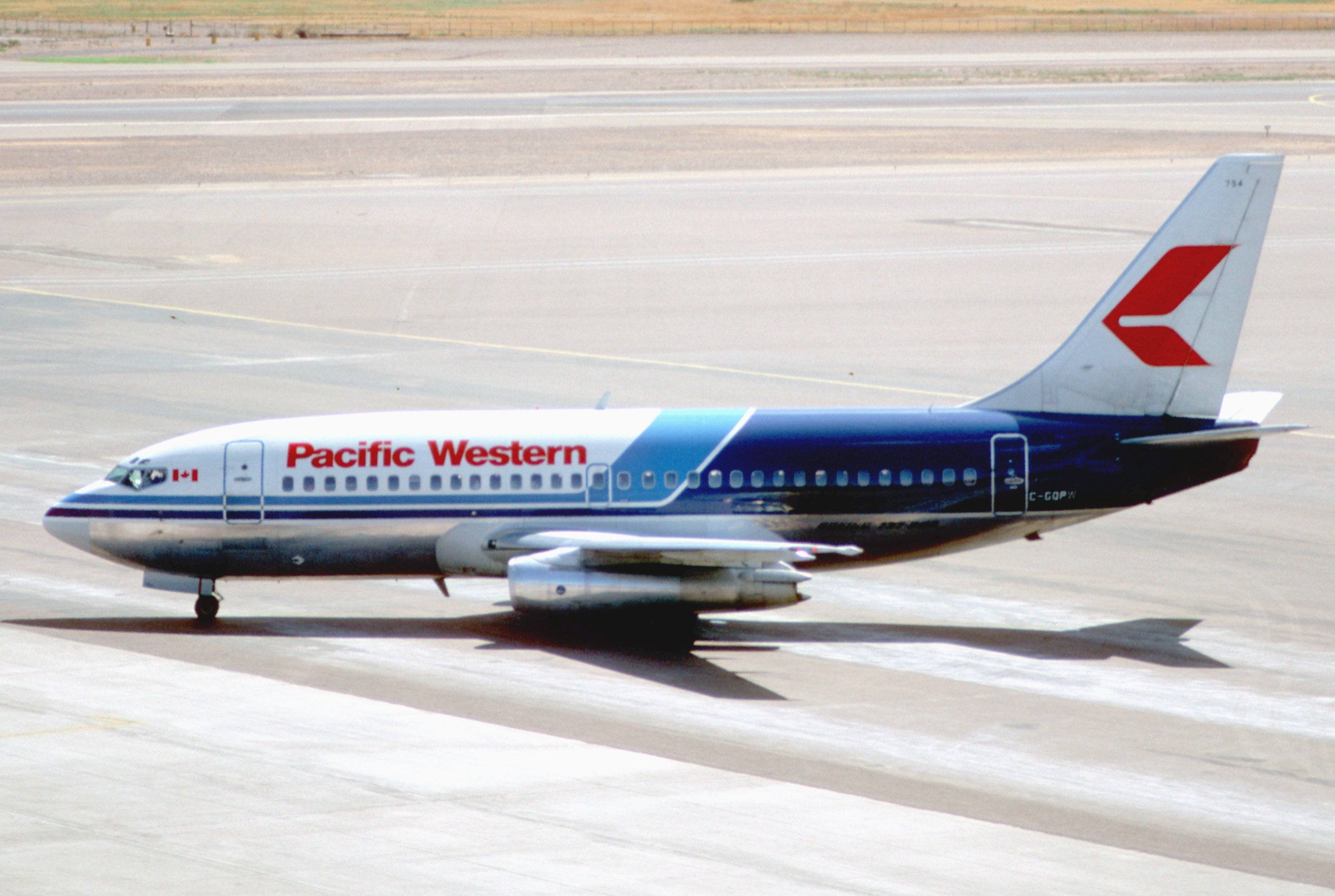
- C-GQPW, the aircraft involved in the accident, photographed in 1983
- Aircraft type: Boeing 737-275
- Operator: Pacific Western Airlines
- IATA flight No.: PW501
- ICAO flight No.: PWA501
- Registration: C-GQPW
- Flight origin: Calgary International Airport
- Destination: Edmonton International Airport
- Occupants: 119
- Passengers: 114
- Crew: 5
- Fatalities: 0
- Injuries: 27 (5 Seriously 22 Minor Injuries)
- Survivors: 119

Pacific Western Airlines Flight 501 was a regularly scheduled flight from Calgary to Edmonton, Alberta, Canada. The Boeing 737-200 caught fire during takeoff on March 22, 1984. All 119 passengers and crew members survived, but five people suffered serious injuries while 22 others suffered minor injuries.

== Background ==
=== Aircraft ===
The aircraft involved was a 3 year old Boeing 737-275 registered as C-GQPW. It had 7,447 flight hours with the manufacturing number 22265/775. The aircraft was also equipped with two Pratt & Whitney JT8D-9A engines.

== Accident ==
Flight 501 began taxing from the gate at Calgary International Airport at 7:35 AM and proceeded to take off on runway 34, carrying five crew members and 114 passengers. At 7:42 AM, a loud popping sound was heard 20 seconds into the takeoff run. The aircraft began to vibrate and veer to the left, and a fire broke out in the rear of the aircraft. The pilot, Stan Fleming, managed to abort the take-off.

An emergency evacuation was ordered as the fire spread throughout the aircraft. Five people were seriously injured and 22 suffered minor injuries, but no one was killed. The aircraft was destroyed by the fire.

== Cause ==
The Canadian Aviation Safety Board (CASB) determined that an uncontained failure of the left engine thirteenth stage compressor disc had occurred. Debris from the engine punctured a fuel cell, resulting in the fire. The disc failure was the result of fatigue cracking. This incident was similar to the cause of the British Airtours Flight 28M disaster that claimed 55 lives the following year on August 22, 1985.
