= Southwest Airlines Flight 1380 =

2018 aviation accident over Pennsylvania

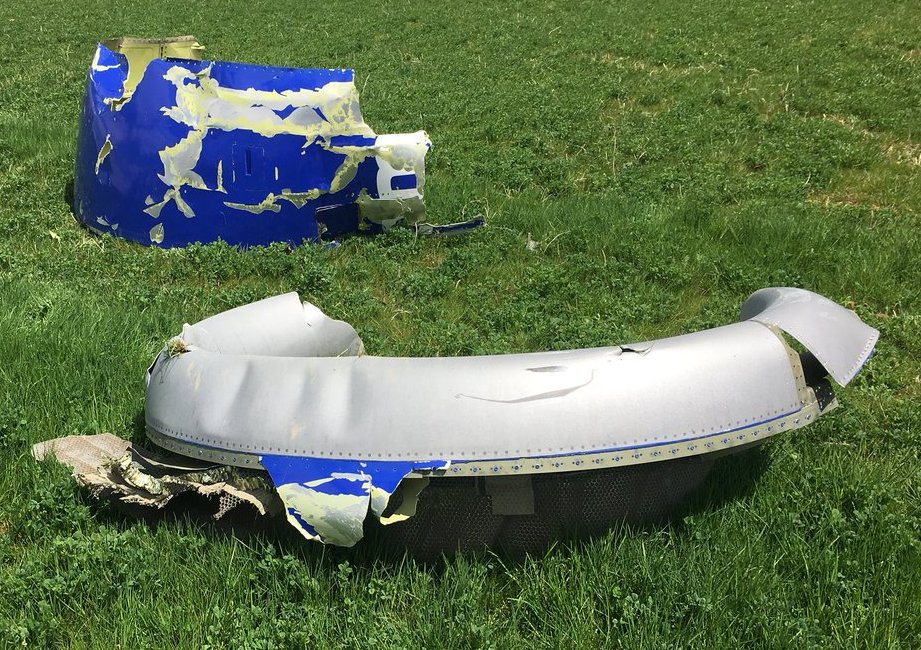
- Pieces of the aircraft engine nacelle in a field

Accident
- Date: April 17, 2018
- Summary: Engine failure leading to rapid depressurization
- Site: Over Pennsylvania, United States

Aircraft
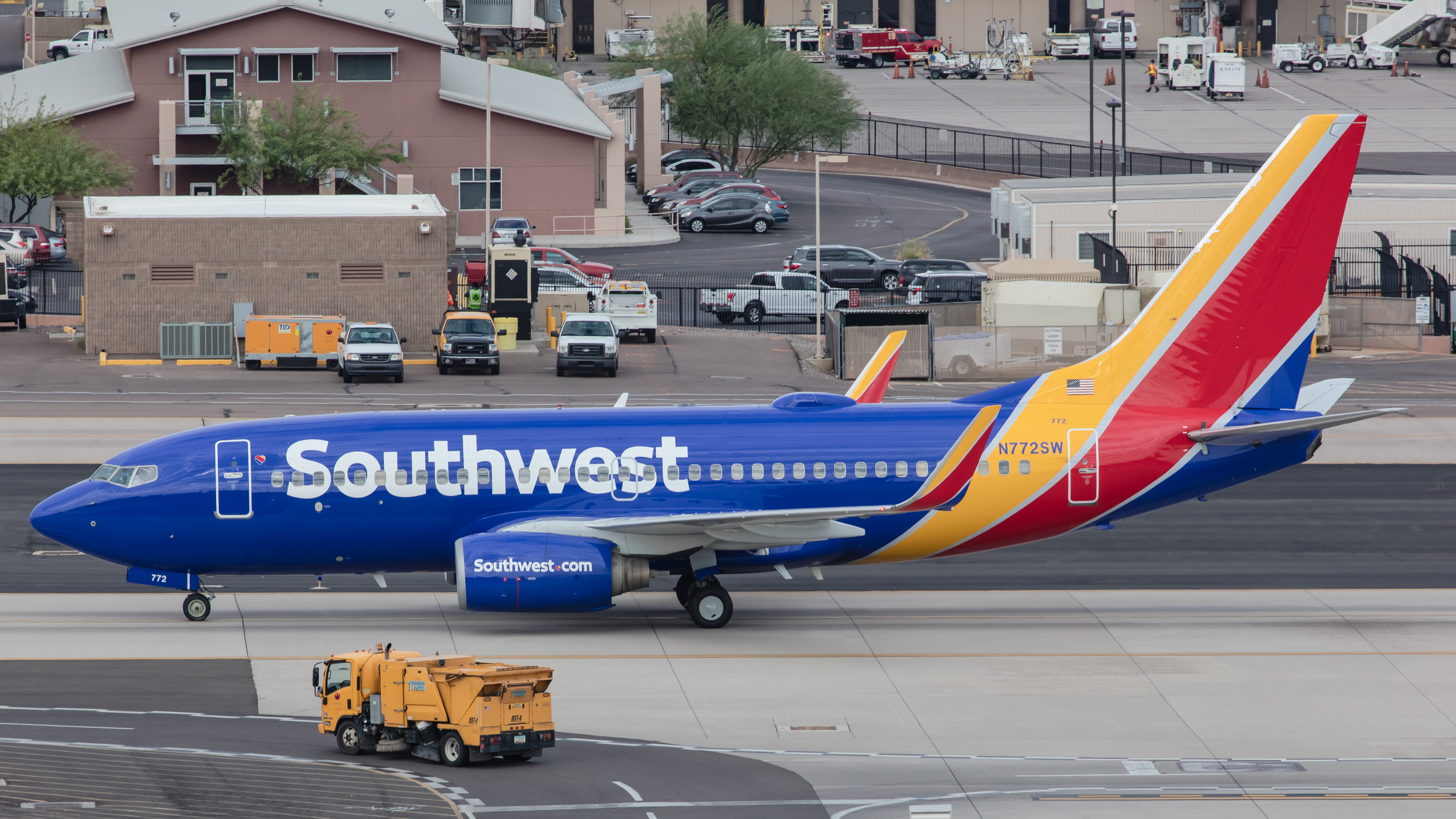
- N772SW, the aircraft involved in the accident, seen in 2016
- Aircraft type: Boeing 737-7H4
- Operator: Southwest Airlines
- IATA flight No.: WN1380
- ICAO flight No.: SWA1380
- Call sign: SOUTHWEST 1380
- Registration: N772SW
- Flight origin: LaGuardia Airport, New York City, New York, United States
- Destination: Dallas Love Field, Dallas, Texas, United States
- Occupants: 149
- Passengers: 144
- Crew: 5
- Fatalities: 1
- Injuries: 8
- Survivors: 148

On April 17, 2018, Southwest Airlines Flight 1380, a Boeing 737-700 flying from LaGuardia Airport, New York, en route to Dallas Love Field, Texas, experienced an engine failure over Pennsylvania. The engine cowl was broken in the failure, and cowl fragments damaged the fuselage, bursting a cabin window and causing explosive depressurization of the aircraft. Other fragments caused damage to the wing. The pilots then descended and diverted to Philadelphia International Airport, Pennsylvania. One passenger was partially ejected from the aircraft and died, while eight other passengers sustained minor injuries. After the accident, the aircraft was written off.

This accident was very similar to an accident suffered 20 months earlier by Southwest Airlines Flight 3472 flying the same aircraft type with the same engine type. After that earlier accident, the engine manufacturer, CFM International, issued a service directive calling for ultrasonic inspections of the turbine fan blades with certain serial numbers, service cycles, or service time. Southwest Airlines did not perform the inspection on the engine involved in this failure because it was not required to according to the parameters specified by the directive.

The final report, released in 2019, recommended that Boeing should develop and install a redesigned fan cowl structure due to the cowling latch's vulnerability in a fan blade outage.

== Background ==
=== Aircraft ===
The aircraft involved, manufactured in 2000, was a Boeing 737-7H4 with manufacturer's serial number 27880, fuselage line number 601, and registered as N772SW. Delivered to Southwest Airlines on July 7, 2000, the aircraft had logged 62,521 hours of flying time in 37,021 takeoff and landing cycles. It was powered by two CFM International CFM56-7B24 engines. At the time of the accident, the aircraft was around 18 years old.

=== Passengers and crew ===
In command was 56-year-old Captain Tammie Jo Shults, a former United States Navy (USN) fighter pilot. She had logged 11,715 flight hours, 10,513 of which were logged on the Boeing 737. She joined Southwest Airlines in 1994.

The co-pilot was 44-year-old First Officer Darren Lee Ellisor, a former United States Air Force (1997–2007) pilot with experience in the Boeing E-3 Sentry and a veteran of the Iraq War. He had logged 9,508 flight hours, with 6,927 hours on the Boeing 737. He joined Southwest Airlines in 2008.

There were 144 passengers and five crew members on board.

== Accident ==
About 30 minutes after departing LaGuardia, at 11:03 am Eastern Daylight Time (EDT), while the aircraft was climbing past 32,000 feet (9,800 m), a fan blade in the left engine broke due to a latent fatigue crack. The detached blade fragment struck the fan case and, although it did not penetrate it, the impact was sufficient to cause the cowling latch to fail and the engine cowling to detach from the engine. In that instant, the aircraft therefore had an engine failure and the separation of the aircraft structure around the engine. The cowling parts struck the leading edge of the wing, and as a result, the aircraft rolled to the left by 41.3°. The parts also broke a window at row 14 in the passenger compartment, which caused an uncontrolled decompression of the aircraft. After stabilizing the aircraft by countering the roll, the pilots began an emergency descent and landed at Philadelphia International Airport (PHL) 17 minutes after the emergency began.

The flight crew stated that there were no signs of trouble during the departure and climb from LaGuardia; First Officer Ellisor was the pilot flying while Captain Shults was monitoring. They reported that the aircraft yawed, several cockpit alarms went off, gray smoke blew into the cockpit, and the aircraft's cabin suddenly lost air pressure. The pilots donned their emergency oxygen masks and started an emergency descent. The parameters of the flight data recorder (FDR) showed that the left engine's performance died down, vibration became extreme, and within five seconds, the cabin altitude alert activated, meaning that the cabin was suffering a cabin depressurization. Due to the extensive damage, the pilots stated that the aircraft was not easy to control throughout the remainder of the flight. Captain Shults took over flying the plane, and the first officer carried out the emergency checklist. The captain asked the air traffic controller for a course diversion. She initially requested a course to the nearest airport, which was Harrisburg International Airport, but then decided that Philadelphia International Airport (PHL) was best equipped for this aircraft's emergency. The controller quickly provided vectors to PHL. The captain initially intended for a long final approach to make sure the crew completed the emergency checklists. Upon learning of the passengers' injuries, however, she decided to speed the approach and to land swiftly. Given the need to get a damaged aircraft on the ground as soon as possible, the crew abbreviated some checklists for the emergency that was in progress and omitted others completely. This effectively managed the high workload in the cockpit of an aircraft that was difficult to handle and achieved the desired safe and prompt landing. The decision-making over checklists was deemed appropriate in the final report by the NTSB.

In the cabin, the three flight attendants on the flight, Rachel Fernheimer, Seanique Mallory, and Kathryn Sandoval, along with another Southwest Airlines employee who was on board as a passenger, all reported a loud sound and felt intense vibration. The oxygen masks in the cabin dropped down automatically. Equipped with portable oxygen bottles, the flight attendants began to move through the cabin to assist passengers. As they did, they found Jennifer Riordan, an adult female passenger, in row 14 partially blown out of the broken window. With the help of two passengers, flight attendants pulled Riordan inside the aircraft and other passengers performed CPR on her. Riordan was declared dead after being taken to a local hospital. A spokesperson for the Philadelphia Department of Public Health stated that Riordan's cause of death was blunt force trauma to the head, neck and torso. Eight other passengers sustained minor injuries.

After the accident, the aircraft was written off.

== Investigation ==
=== Initial investigation ===
NTSB Investigation images

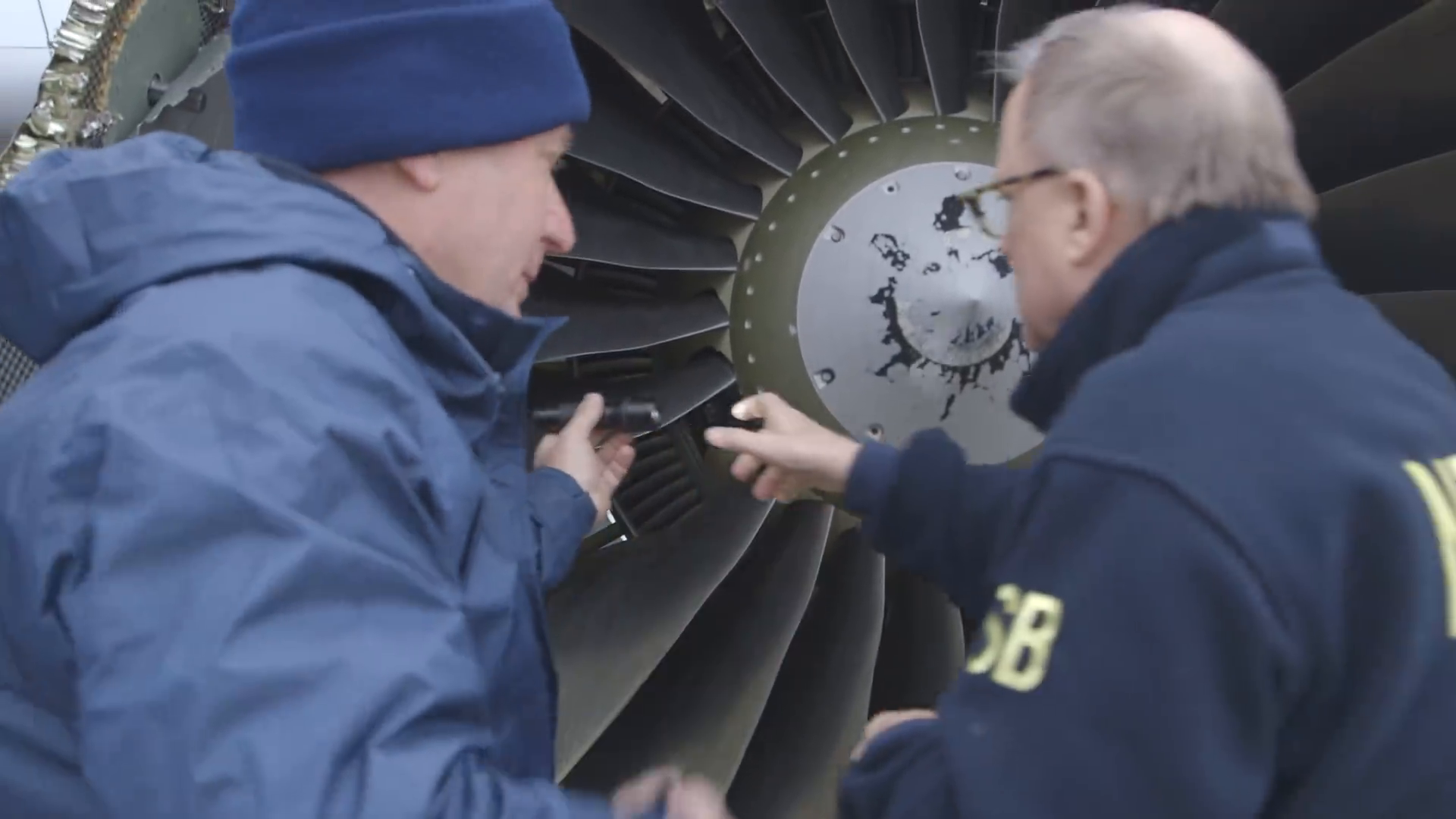
NTSB investigators indicating the location of the missing fan blade

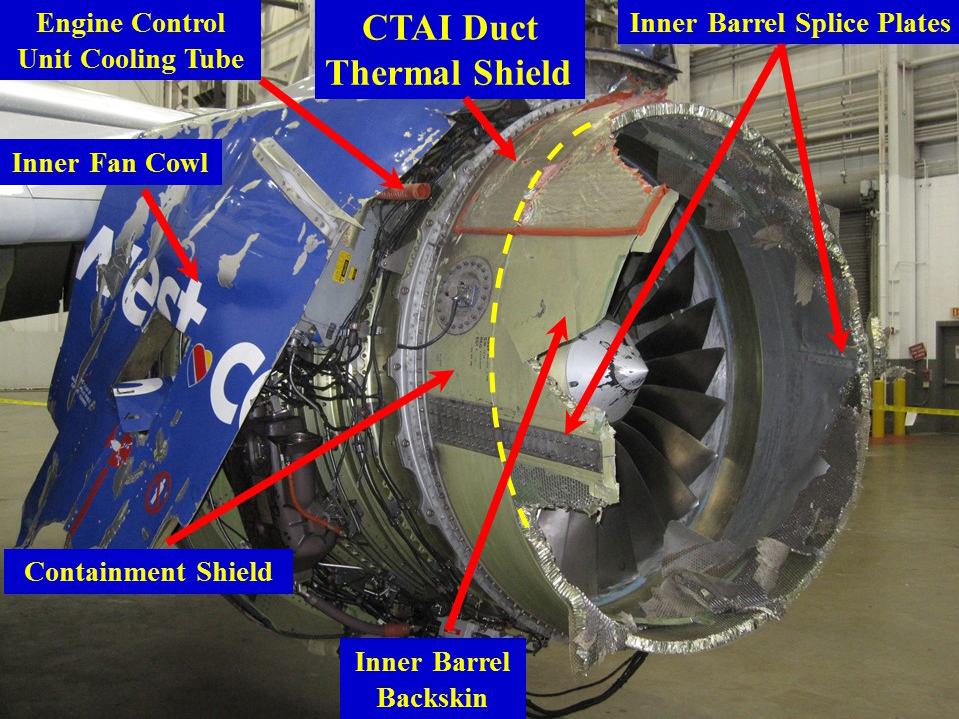
The inboard side of the damaged cowling

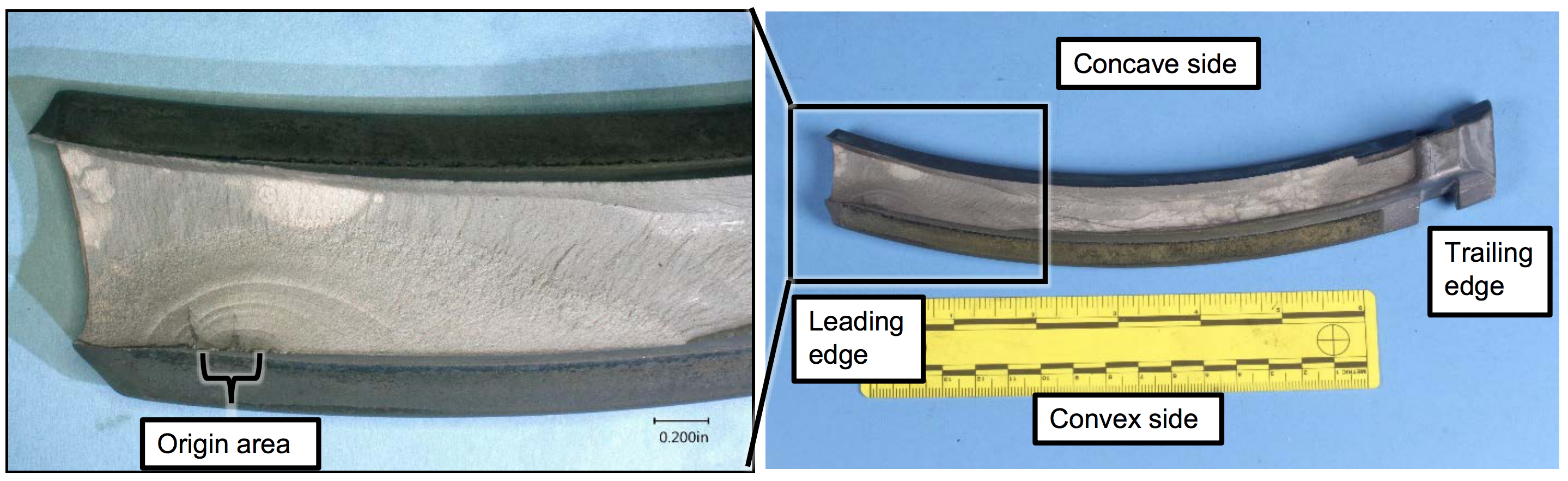
Piece of the failed fan blade showing fracture surface with fatigue indications

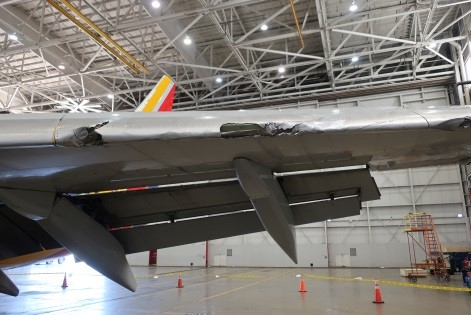
Damage to the leading edge of the left wing

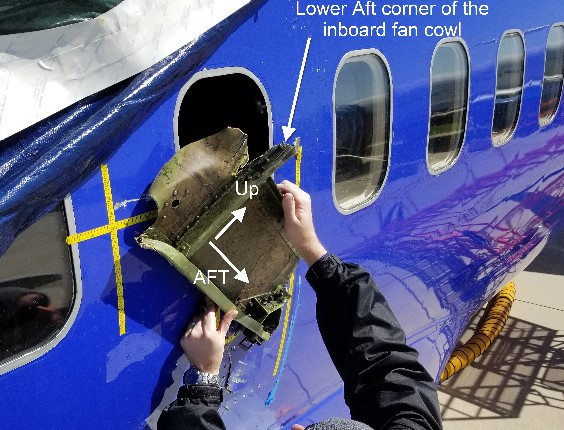
The hole left by the failed window with part of the engine inboard fan cowl

The participants in the investigation included the National Transportation Safety Board (NTSB), the United States Federal Aviation Administration (FAA), Boeing, Southwest Airlines, GE Aviation, the Aircraft Mechanics Fraternal Association (AMFA), the Southwest Airlines Pilots' Association, the Transport Workers Union of America, and UTC Aerospace Systems. Because the manufacturer of the failed engine is a US-French joint venture, the French Bureau of Enquiry and Analysis for Civil Aviation Safety (BEA) also contributed in the investigation. Technical teams from CFM International assisted with the investigation. The NTSB expected the investigation to take 12 to 15 months.

NTSB investigators analyzed a recording of the air traffic radar plots and observed that the radar had shown debris falling from the aircraft and used wind data to predict where ground searchers could find it. Parts from the engine's nacelle were found in the predicted area at several locations near the town of Bernville in Berks County, Pennsylvania, 70 miles (110 km; 61 nmi) northwest of Philadelphia.

On April 20, 2018, three days after the accident, CFM International issued Service Bulletin 72-1033, applicable to the CFM56-7B-series engine, and on the same day, the FAA issued emergency airworthiness directive (EAD) 2018-09-51 based on it. The CFM service bulletin recommended ultrasonic inspections of all fan blades on engines that had logged 20,000 engine cycles and subsequently at intervals not to exceed 3,000 engine cycles. The EAD required CFM56-7B engine fleet fan blade inspections for engines with 30,000 or greater cycles within 20 days of issuance, per the instructions provided in the service bulletin and if any crack indications were found, the affected fan blade was required to be removed from service before further flight. This directive was issued as a one-time inspection requirement. On the same day, the European Aviation Safety Agency (EASA) also issued EAD 2018-0093E (superseding EASA AD 2018-0071) that required the same ultrasonic fan blade inspections to be performed. The engine manufacturer estimated the new directive affected 352 engines in the US and 681 engines worldwide.

On April 23, 2018, Southwest Airlines announced that it was voluntarily going beyond the FAA EAD requirement and performing ultrasonic inspections on all CFM engines in its fleet, including two each on around 700 Boeing 737-700 and 737-800 aircraft.

On April 30, 2018, the aircraft involved in the accident was released by the NTSB and was flown by Southwest Airlines to a service facility performing major services on Boeing aircraft at Paine Field in Everett, Washington, for repairs.

On May 2, 2018, the FAA issued follow-up airworthiness directive (AD) 2018-09-10, which expanded the inspections on CFM56-7B engines beyond the original EAD 2018-09-51. The new AD required inspections of engines with lower cycles and introduced repeat inspection requirements, including a requirement to perform detailed inspections on each fan blade before it accumulated 20,000 cycles since new or within 113 days, whichever occurred later, or within 113 days from the effective date of the AD if cycles since new on a fan blade were unknown with repeat inspections no later than 3,000 cycles since the last inspection. If any unserviceable fan blade was found, it was required to be removed from service before further flight. The FAA estimated that this AD affected 3,716 engines installed on aircraft of U.S. registry at an estimated cost of $8,585 per blade replacement.

After flying to Paine Field in Everett, the plane then moved to Southern California Logistics Airport in Victorville, California, on June 7, 2018, where it was placed into storage. The aircraft remained there and never flew again.

=== Preliminary findings ===
On May 3, 2018, the NTSB released an investigative update with preliminary findings:

- Initial examination of the aircraft revealed that the majority of the inlet cowl was missing, including the entire outer barrel, the aft bulkhead and the inner barrel forward of the containment ring. The inlet cowl containment ring was intact, but exhibited numerous impact witness marks. Examination of the fan case revealed no through-hole fragment exit penetrations; however, it did exhibit a breach hole that corresponded to one of the fan blade impact marks and fan case tearing.
- The number-13 fan blade had separated at the root; the dovetail remained installed in the fan disk. Examination of the fan blade dovetail exhibited features consistent with metal fatigue initiating at the convex side near the leading edge. Two pieces of the fan blade were recovered from within the engine between the fan blades and the outlet guide vanes. One piece was part of the blade airfoil root that mated with the dovetail that remained in the fan disk; it was about 12 inches (30 cm) spanwise and full width and weighed about 6.825 pounds (3.096 kg). The other piece, identified as another part of the airfoil, measured about 2 inches (5 cm) spanwise, appeared to be full width, was twisted and weighed about 0.650 pounds (295 g). All the remaining fan blades exhibited a combination of trailing edge airfoil hard-body impact damage, trailing edge tears and missing material. Some also exhibited airfoil leading-edge tip curl or distortion. After the general in situ engine inspection was completed, the remaining fan blades were removed from the fan disk and an ultrasonic inspection was performed with no other cracks found.
- The accident engine's fan blades had accumulated more than 32,000 engine cycles. (Note: In aviation, an engine cycle generally consists of an engine start, an aircraft takeoff, an aircraft landing, and an engine shutdown. Engine starts without the aircraft flying are not counted as cycles.) Maintenance records showed that the blades had been periodically lubricated as required and that they were last overhauled 10,712 engine cycles before the accident. At the time of the last blade overhaul (November 2012), they were inspected using visual and fluorescent penetrant inspections. After an August 27, 2016, accident in Pensacola, Florida, in which a fan blade fractured, eddy-current inspections were incorporated into the overhaul process requirements. In the time since the fan blades' overhaul, the blade dovetails had been lubricated six times. At the time each of these fan blade lubrications occurred, the fan blade dovetail had been visually inspected as required.

=== NTSB investigative hearings ===
The NTSB held an investigative hearing on November 14, 2018. At the hearing, FAA Transport Standards Branch representative Victor Wicklund stated that the production inlets were not required to be subjected to certification testing, but if they were included and test damage mirrored that of the accident aircraft, it would most likely constitute a certification failure. He indicated that the cowling may require design changes.

The NTSB held a second investigative hearing on November 19, 2019. The NTSB also issued five safety recommendations to the FAA, one to the European Union Aviation Safety Agency (EASA), and one to Southwest Airlines.

=== Final report ===
On November 19, 2019, during the second hearing, the NTSB released the final report on this accident.

==== Final report findings ====
The NTSB released additional findings in the final report. Among others, some read:

- None of the following were factors in this accident: (1) flight crew qualifications, which were in accordance with US regulations; (2) flight crew medical conditions; (3) the airworthiness of the airplane before the left engine failure occurred; and (4) Southwest Airlines' maintenance of the airplane.
- The low-cycle fatigue crack in the fan blade dovetail initiated because of higher-than-expected dovetail stresses under normal operating loads, and this crack was most likely not detectable during the fluorescent penetrant inspection at the time of the fan blade set's last overhaul and subsequent visual inspections at the time of fan blade relubrications.
- The requirement to perform an eddy current inspection at the time of fan blade overhaul and an ultrasonic inspection at the time of blade relubrication should enable cracked fan blades in CFM56-7B engines to be detected and removed from service before the cracks reach a critical size and the blades fracture.
- The fan blade fragments that traveled forward of the fan case, along with the displacement wave created by the fan blade's impact with the fan case, caused damage that compromised the structural integrity of the inlet and caused portions of the inlet to depart from the airplane.
- Portions of the fan cowl departed the airplane because (1) the impact of the separated fan blade with the fan case imparted significant loads into the fan cowl through the radial restraint fitting and (2) the associated stresses in the fan cowl structure exceeded the residual strength of the fan cowl, causing its failure.
- The impact of the inboard fan cowl aft latch keeper with the fuselage near the cabin window adjacent to seat 14A caused the window to depart the airplane, the rapid depressurization of the cabin, and the passenger fatality.
- The structural analysis modeling tools that currently exist to analyze a fan-blade-out (FBO) event and predict the subsequent engine and airframe damage will allow airplane manufacturers to better understand the interaction of the engine and airframe during an FBO event and the response of the inlet, fan cowl, and associated structures in the airplane's normal operating envelope.
- Performing required checklists according to standard operating procedures is a critical part of safe flight operations. However, given the emergency situation aboard this flight, the flight crew's performance of most, but not all, of the items on the Engine Fire or Engine Severe Damage or Separation non-normal checklist and the nonperformance of the three other relevant non-normal checklists allowed the crew to appropriately balance the procedural requirement of executing checklists with the high workload associated with maintaining airplane control and accomplishing a safe and timely descent and landing.
- The flight crew's decision to land at Philadelphia International Airport was appropriate given the airplane's location at the time of the emergency, the circumstances of the emergency, and the airport's multiple runways and aircraft rescue and firefighting capabilities.
- Although not a factor in the outcome of this accident, the flight attendants should have been properly restrained in their assigned jumpseats in case an emergency evacuation after landing was necessary.
- Federal Aviation Administration guidance addressing options for reseating passengers if an in-flight loss of seating capacity were to occur would help air carriers implement procedures to address this situation.

==== Probable cause ====
The probable cause reads:

The National Transportation Safety Board (NTSB) determines that the probable cause of this accident was a low-cycle fatigue crack in the dovetail of fan blade No. 13, which resulted in the fan blade separating in flight and impacting the engine fan case at a location that was critical to the structural integrity and performance of the fan cowl structure. This impact led to the in-flight separation of fan cowl components, including the inboard fan cowl aft latch keeper, which struck the fuselage near a cabin window and caused the window to depart from the airplane, the cabin to rapidly depressurize and the passenger fatality.

The major recommendation of the report was that the Federal Aviation Administration should require Boeing to discover, for this aircraft and engine type, which parts of the engine fan case were susceptible to transmitting damage to the fan cowl structure and then redesign the fan cowl so that it retains its integrity after such a "blade out" event.

==== Design changes ====
In 2023, Boeing stated that it had completed the design process suggested by the NTSB, but needed additional time to complete changes to prevent cowl latch failures due to operator error (in not closing the latch securely). All airlines operating the Next Generation aircraft are expected by the FAA to implement the new design changes by July 31, 2028. Finally, Boeing has up to December 31, 2029, to issue fixes of any other possible maintenance mistakes.

== Reactions ==
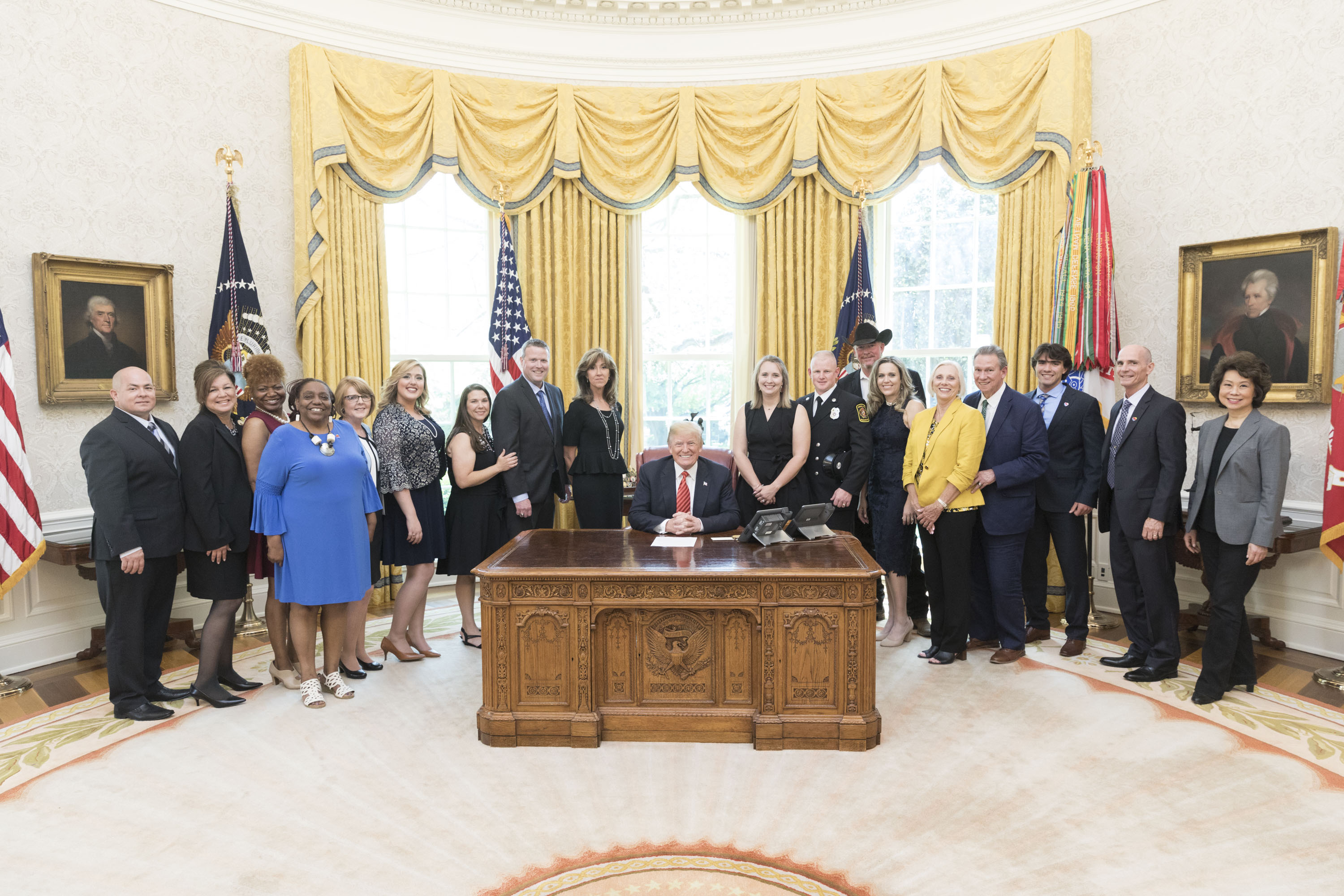
President Trump welcomes the crew and select passengers of the flight at the White House on May 1, 2018

On the day of the accident, Elaine Chao, the United States Secretary of Transportation, made a statement to "commend the pilots who safely landed the aircraft, and the crew and fellow passengers who provided support and care for the injured, preventing what could have been far worse." Shortly thereafter, Martha McSally, then a member of the United States House of Representatives from Arizona, introduced a resolution in Congress commending Captain Shults.

On May 1, 2018, United States President Donald Trump welcomed crew members and select passengers in a ceremony at the Oval Office of the White House, thanking them all for their heroism.

Southwest Airlines gave each passenger $5,000 and a $1,000 voucher for future travel with the airline. Southwest Airlines bookings fell following the accident, resulting in a projected decline in revenue for the airline for the second quarter of 2018. Following the accident, passenger Lilia Chavez filed a lawsuit against Southwest Airlines claiming that she has post-traumatic stress disorder since the accident. Her lawsuit was later settled on March 21, 2019.

Captain Shults wrote a book about the incident titled Nerves of Steel. The book was published in the United States on October 8, 2019.

== In popular culture ==
This accident was featured on the fifth episode of season 21 of the Canadian documentary series Mayday, known in the United States as Air Disasters. The episode is titled "Cabin Catastrophe".

== See also ==
- National Airlines Flight 27, a 1973 accident involving an uncontained engine failure and a passenger being ejected from the aircraft through a window
- Delta Air Lines Flight 1288, a 1996 accident involving an uncontained engine failure and two fatalities from pieces of the engine penetrating the aircraft fuselage
- TAM Airlines Flight 9755, a 2001 accident involving an uncontained engine failure and a passenger being partially ejected from the aircraft through a window and killed
- United Airlines Flight 1175, a prior fan blade out incident with loss of cowling on the larger Boeing 777-200 in 2018 with no injuries
- United Airlines Flight 328, suffered another fan blade out incident with loss of cowling in 2021 with no injuries
- Qantas Flight 32 (2010), Air France Flight 066 (2017), and United Airlines Flight 232 (1989), cases of uncontained engine failure
- Lists of unusual deaths
