= Tularosa, New Mexico =

Tularosa
- Village
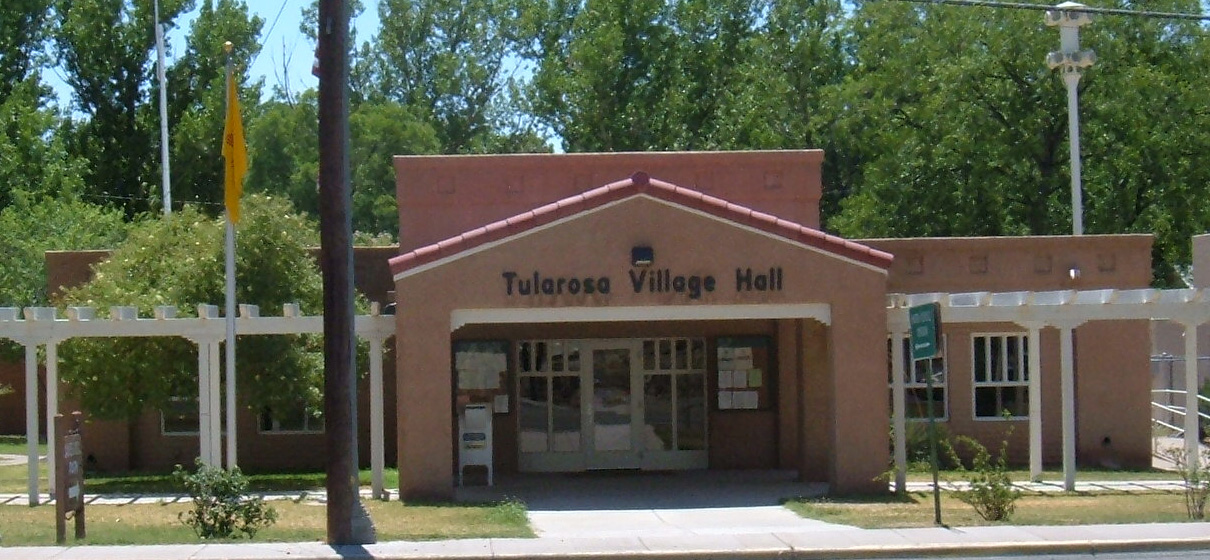
- Tularosa Village Hall
- Motto: "City of Roses"
- Location of Tularosa, New Mexico

- Location in New Mexico Location in the United States
- Coordinates: 33°04′31″N 106°01′03″W
- Country: United States
- State: New Mexico
- County: Otero
- Founded: 1863

Government
  - Mayor: Ray Cordova

Area
  - Total: 2.82 sq mi (7.30 km^{2})
  - Land: 2.82 sq mi (7.30 km^{2})
  - Water: 0 sq mi (0.00 km^{2})
- Elevation: 4,514 ft (1,376 m)

Population (2020)
  - Total: 2,553
  - Estimate (2022): 2,593
  - Density: 920/sq mi (355.1/km^{2})
- Time zone: UTC–7 (Mountain (MST))
  - Summer (DST): UTC–6 (MDT)
- ZIP code: 88352
- Area code: Area code 575
- FIPS code: 35-79980
- GNIS feature ID: 2413595
- Website: villageoftularosa.com

Tularosa is a village in Otero County, New Mexico, United States. The town shares its name with the Tularosa Basin, in which the town is located. To the east, Tularosa is flanked by the western edge of the Sacramento Mountains. The population was 2,553 at the 2020 census. During the 1990s and early 2000s, the town, north of the much larger Alamogordo, experienced moderate growth and construction as a bedroom community, especially in the housing industry. Tularosa is noted for its abundance of cottonwood shade trees and its efforts to preserve the adobe-style architecture of its past.

== History ==
Tularosa gets its name from the Spanish description for the red or rose colored reeds growing along the banks of the Rio Tularosa. The Rio Tularosa, which still exists along the north side of the village, attracted the original settlers as a water source in the desert. Settlers attempted to establish a settlement in 1860 but were unsuccessful due to Mescalero Apache raids. Two years later, after a battle at nearby Round Mountain, Mexican farmers from the Rio Grande valley succeeded in settling the area. The Mission Church, St Francis de Paula was built to honor a promise made to St Francis that if no one was killed in the battle at Round Mountain, the townspeople would build a church dedicated to him. In 1863, the Town of Tularosa was formally established and was mapped with 49 blocks and water rights distributed and recorded.

The original acequia (ditch irrigation system) remains virtually unchanged and provides the water for the trees lining the streets, private gardens, and landscaping that give Tularosa its unique character.

In 1979, the Tularosa Original Townsite District, consisting of the original 49 blocks on 1,400 acres (5.7 km^{2}) including 182 buildings, was declared a historic district and recorded in the National Register of Historic Places.

In 2008 Tularosa became an affiliate of Keep America Beautiful. The local branch of the program, Keep Tularosa Beautiful, received a grant in 2008 of $10,000 for beautification projects from Waste Management.

== Geography ==
According to the United States Census Bureau, the village has a total area of 2.1 square miles (5.4 km^{2}), all land. At the northern side of town is the Tularosa Creek which flows out of Tularosa Canyon, descending from the Mescalero Apache Indian Reservation, and which separates the Sacramento Mountains to the south from Sierra Blanca to the north. The Coyote Hills are to the north-east of town, foothills of the Sacramentos.

== Demographics ==
Historical population
Census	Pop.	Note	%±
1880	549		—
1920	1,096		—
1930	1,406		28.3%
1940	1,446		2.8%
1950	1,642		13.6%
1960	3,200		94.9%
1970	2,851		−10.9%
1980	2,536		−11.0%
1990	2,615		3.1%
2000	2,864		9.5%
2010	2,842		−0.8%
2020	2,553		−10.2%
2022 (est.)	2,593	▲	1.6%
U.S. Decennial Census; 2020 Census

=== 2020 census ===
As of the 2020 census, Tularosa had a population of 2,553. The median age was 46.2 years. 23.3% of residents were under the age of 18 and 23.5% of residents were 65 years of age or older. For every 100 females there were 87.3 males, and for every 100 females age 18 and over there were 85.3 males age 18 and over.

0.0% of residents lived in urban areas, while 100.0% lived in rural areas.

There were 1,101 households in Tularosa, of which 29.0% had children under the age of 18 living in them. Of all households, 33.7% were married-couple households, 21.1% were households with a male householder and no spouse or partner present, and 36.8% were households with a female householder and no spouse or partner present. About 34.1% of all households were made up of individuals and 18.4% had someone living alone who was 65 years of age or older.

There were 1,335 housing units, of which 17.5% were vacant. The homeowner vacancy rate was 3.1% and the rental vacancy rate was 16.7%.

Racial composition as of the 2020 census
Race	Number	Percent
White	1,388	54.4%
Black or African American	28	1.1%
American Indian and Alaska Native	258	10.1%
Asian	14	0.5%
Native Hawaiian and Other Pacific Islander	2	0.1%
Some other race	410	16.1%
Two or more races	453	17.7%
Hispanic or Latino (of any race)	1,351	52.9%

=== 2000 census ===
As of the census of 2000, there were 2,864 people, 1,134 households, and 765 families residing in the village. The population density was 1,363.2 inhabitants per square mile (526.3/km^{2}). There were 1,311 housing units at an average density of 624.0 per square mile (240.9/km^{2}). The racial makeup of the village was 68.61% White, 0.87% African American, 4.26% Native American, 0.66% Asian, 0.03% Pacific Islander, 21.51% from other races, and 4.05% from two or more races. Hispanic or Latino of any race were 56.08% of the population.

There were 1,134 households, out of which 31.0% had children under the age of 18 living with them, 48.2% were married couples living together, 14.9% had a female householder with no husband present, and 32.5% were non-families. 28.4% of all households were made up of individuals, and 12.6% had someone living alone who was 65 years of age or older. The average household size was 2.53 and the average family size was 3.09.

The population was spread out, with 27.4% under the age of 18, 7.3% from 18 to 24, 24.9% from 25 to 44, 24.0% from 45 to 64, and 16.4% who were 65 years of age or older. The median age was 39 years. For every 100 females, there were 92.3 males. For every 100 females age 18 and over, there were 91.4 males.

The median income for a household was $27,522, and the median income for a family was $30,313. Males had a median income of $23,654 versus $18,080 for females. The per capita income in Tularosa was $12,507. About 19.5% of families and 21.4% of the population were below the poverty line, including 29.7% of those under age 18 and 17.0% of those age 65 or over.

== Arts and culture ==
=== Festivals and events ===
The Rose Festival is held annually, usually in the first weekend of May. There is an old-timer's picnic, a Rose Queen, arts and crafts - all celebrating the abundance of blossoming flowers. Other celebrations are the Fiesta of St. Francis de Paula.

On Christmas Eve, luminarias are placed out around the church plaza, along streets and other public spaces, and along U. S. Highways 70 and 54. The one-night-only display is one of Tularosa, New Mexico’s longstanding holiday traditions and is widely associated with the community. For approximately 20 years, most of the luminarias displayed have been supplied through a cooperative effort between the Tularosa Chamber of Commerce and the Village of Tularosa.

=== Points of interest ===
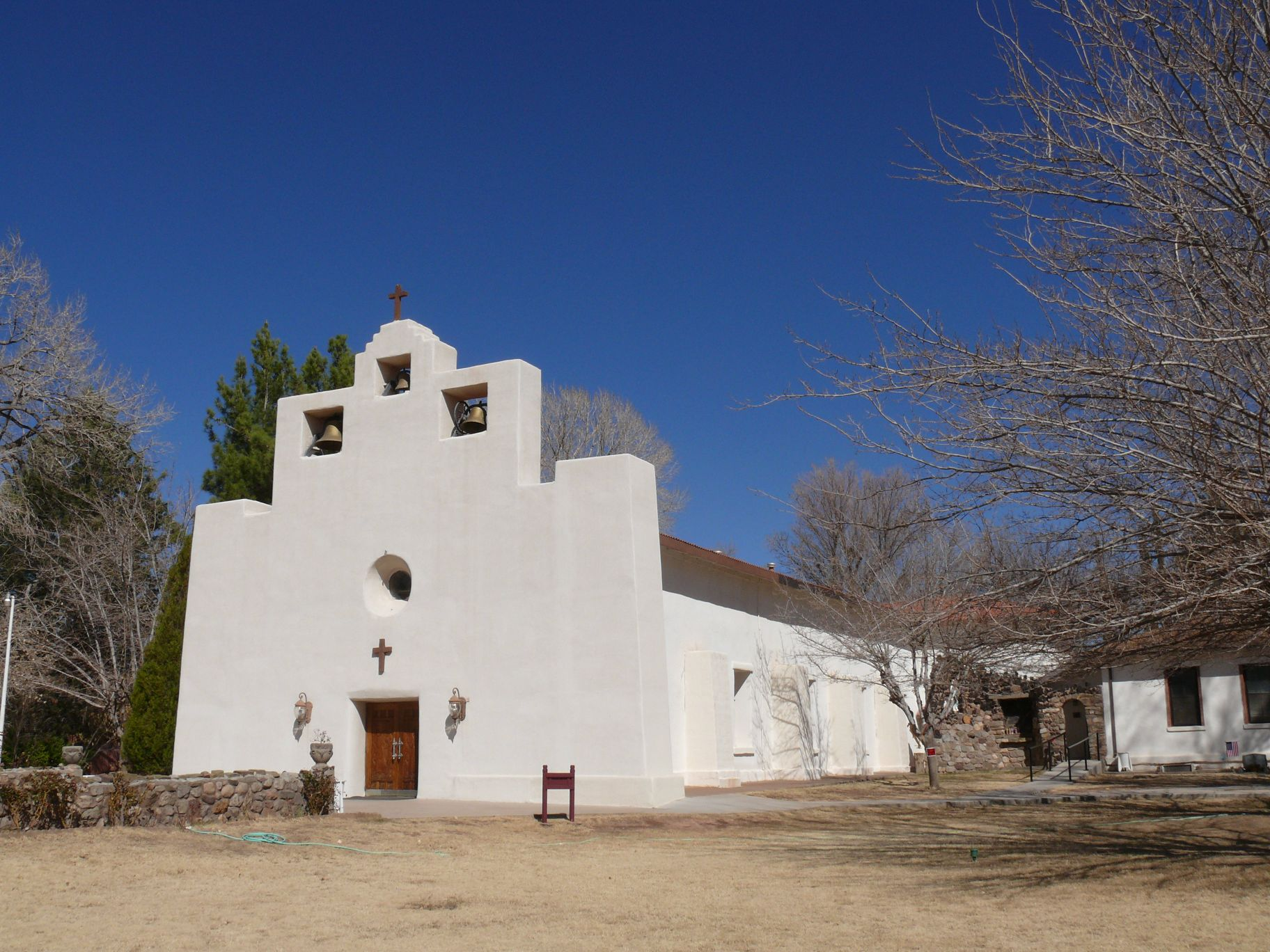
Saint Francis of Paula church

The Tularosa Original Townsite District is a listing on the National Register of Historic Places. It includes Saint Francis de Paula church.

== Education ==
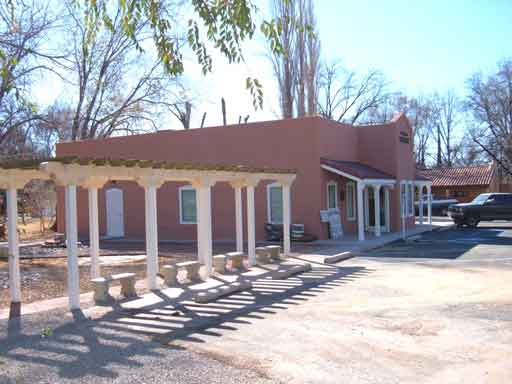
Tularosa Public Library

Tularosa Public Schools is part of the Tularosa Municipal Schools School District. The school district has two elementary schools, one middle school and one high school. In Tularosa are Tularosa Elementary School, Tularosa Middle School and Tularosa High School.

== Media ==
- Some footage from the 2009 movie Transformers: Revenge of the Fallen was shot in and around Tularosa.

== Infrastructure ==
=== Transportation ===
Highways include U.S. Route 54 and U.S. Route 70.

In the early 1900s the El Paso and Southwestern Railroad build a railroad line down from the coal mines at Dawson, New Mexico through Tucumcari and Carrizozo to Tularosa and continuing to El Paso. In 1924, that line later became part of the Southern Pacific Railroad, which merged with Union Pacific Railroad in 1996.

There is a privately owned airstrip at Beckett Farm in Tularosa.

== Notable people ==
- Jan Clayton, film and stage actress
- Dianna Duran, former New Mexico Secretary of State
- Steve Ontiveros, professional baseball player (MLB), pitcher
- Katherine D. Ortega, 38th Treasurer of the United States
- Gary Paulsen, author
- Ace Powell, painter and sculptor
- Tammie Jo Shults, pilot who safely landed Southwest Airlines Flight 1380
- Kim Stanley, film and stage actress

== See also ==
- USS Tularosa - a US Navy ship named for the village.
