= Southwest Airlines Flight 3472 =

2016 aviation accident over the Gulf of Mexico

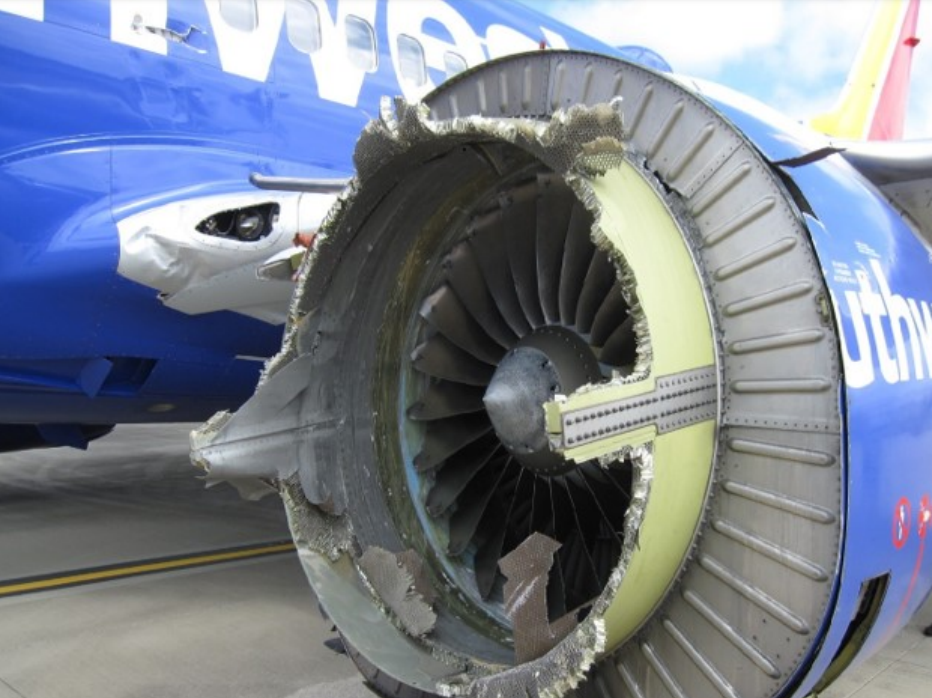
- The damage to the left engine of the aircraft

Accident
- Date: August 27, 2016
- Summary: Engine failure resulting in parts falling from the aircraft
- Site: Over the Gulf of Mexico; 30°28′19″N 87°11′17″W

Aircraft
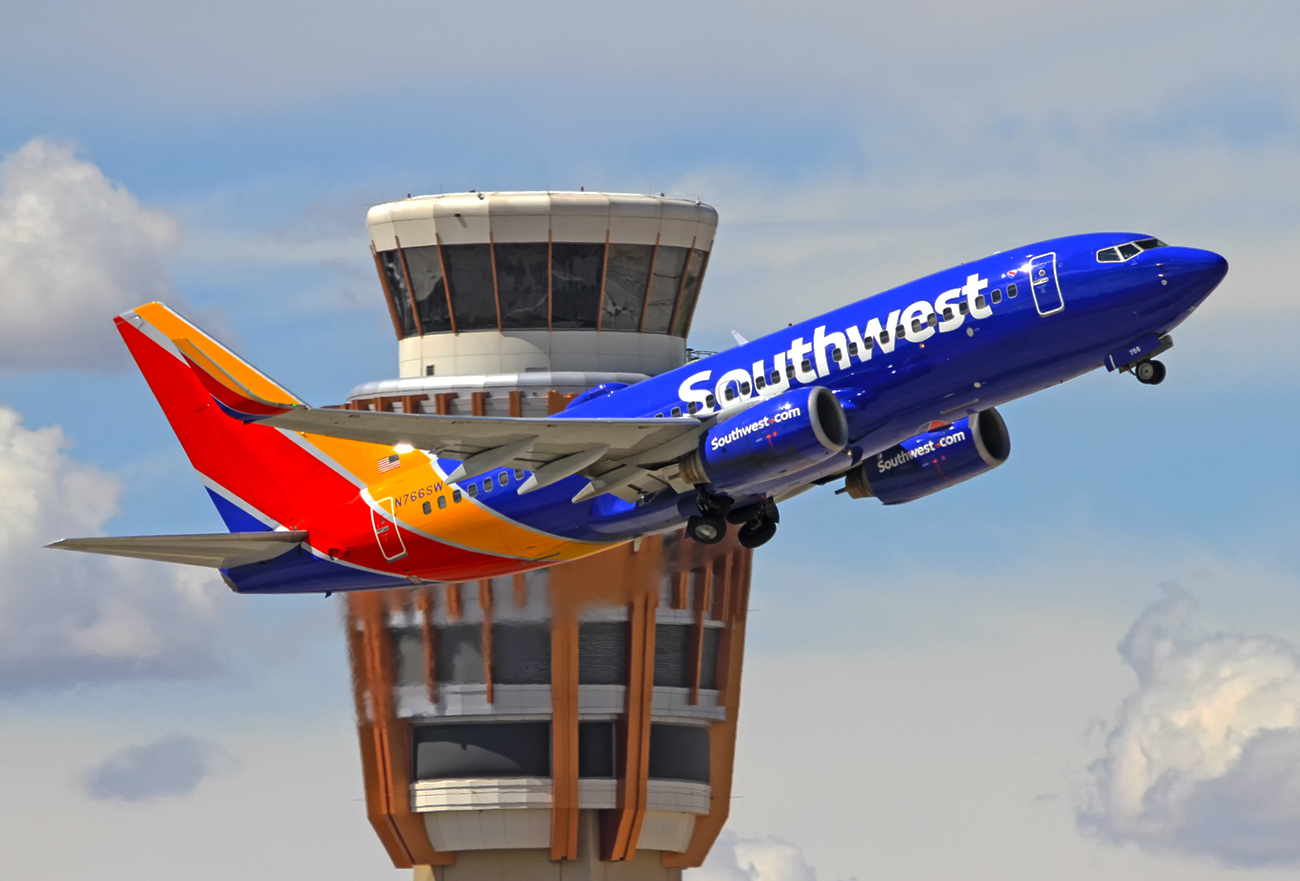
- N766SW, the aircraft involved in the accident, photographed in April 2016
- Aircraft type: Boeing 737-7H4 (Note: The aircraft was a Boeing 737-700 model; for aircraft built prior to late 2016, Boeing assigned a unique code for each company that buys one of its aircraft, which was applied as a suffix to the model number at the time the aircraft was built, hence "737-7H4" designates a 737-700 built for Southwest Airlines (customer code H4).)
- Operator: Southwest Airlines
- IATA flight No.: WN3472
- ICAO flight No.: SWA3472
- Call sign: SOUTHWEST 3472
- Registration: N766SW
- Flight origin: Louis Armstrong New Orleans International Airport, New Orleans, Louisiana, U.S.
- Destination: Orlando International Airport, Orlando, Florida, U.S.
- Occupants: 104
- Passengers: 99
- Crew: 5
- Fatalities: 0
- Injuries: 0
- Survivors: 104

Southwest Airlines Flight 3472 was a regularly scheduled passenger flight operating from New Orleans International Airport in New Orleans, Louisiana, to Orlando International Airport in Orlando, Florida. On August 27, 2016, the Boeing 737-700, with 99 passengers and five crew, 12 minutes after departure from New Orleans, was climbing through 31,000 feet (9,400 m) and heading east over the Gulf of Mexico when the aircraft's number one CFM International CFM56-7 engine suffered an engine failure. A fan blade in the engine broke due to a fatigue crack. The separated portion of the blade rotated within the engine, moving forward, striking the engine inlet. Debris from the damaged engine inlet punctured the left side of the fuselage causing a loss of cabin pressure and damaged the wing and empennage. Oxygen masks were deployed to passengers while the crew initiated an emergency descent to 10,000 feet (3,000 m). The aircraft then diverted to Pensacola International Airport for a safe landing about 20 minutes later without further incident. While the aircraft sustained substantial damage, there were no injuries.

The final accident report found that "The fan case had no through-hole penetrations and showed no evidence of an uncontainment." The studies made for the investigation looked at the path of the fan blade that broke and estimated that the fragments were ejected from the front of the engine at an angle consistent with the FBO (fan blade out) testing carried out when the engine was certified. The level of damage to the engine inlet was, however, greater than expected in the accident when compared with the certification test.

== Aircraft ==
The aircraft involved was a 16-year-old Boeing 737-7H4, serial number 29806, registered as N766SW, delivered to Southwest Airlines in 2000. The aircraft had logged 58,344 flight hours and it was also powered by two CFM International CFM56-7B24G22 engines.

== Investigation ==
The accident was investigated by the Federal Aviation Administration and the National Transportation Safety Board (NTSB). On September 12, 2016, the NTSB reported their initial findings.

Initial findings from the examination of the airplane include:

- The left engine inlet separated from the engine during the flight. Debris from the engine inlet damaged the airplane fuselage, wing and empennage.
- A 5-inch by 16-inch hole was found in the left fuselage just above the left wing.
- No fan blade or inlet material was found in the hole and the passenger interior compartment was not penetrated.
- During the accident sequence, the airplane experienced a cabin de-pressurization.
- The aircraft maintenance records are being reviewed.

Initial findings from the engine examination include:

- One fan blade separated from the fan disk during the accident flight.
- The root of the separated fan blade remained in the fan hub; however, the remainder of the blade was not recovered.

Initial findings from the metallurgical examination conducted in the NTSB Materials Laboratory include:

- The fracture surface of the missing blade showed curving crack arrest lines consistent with fatigue crack growth. The fatigue crack region was 29 mm (1.14″) long and 5.5 mm (0.217″) deep.
- The center of the fatigue origin area was about 53 mm (2.1″) aft of the forward face of the blade root. No surface or material anomalies were noted during an examination of the fatigue crack origin using scanning electron microscopy and energy-dispersive x-ray spectroscopy.
- The blades are manufactured of a titanium alloy and the root contact face is coated with a copper-nickel-indium alloy.

Future investigative work by the NTSB will include 3-D measurements of the contact areas of all the blades, a non-destructive examination of the blade surfaces for cracks, and a review of the engine maintenance records.

Parties to the investigation include the Federal Aviation Administration, Southwest Airlines, the Southwest Airlines Pilots Association, and CFM International, which is a joint venture between GE Aviation (US) and Safran Aircraft Engines (France). The French Bureau of Enquiry and Analysis for Civil Aviation Safety has also appointed an accredited representative who is supported by a technical advisor from Safran Aircraft Engines.

On March 30, 2020, the NTSB determined the probable cause of the accident as follows: "A low-cycle fatigue crack in the dovetail of fan blade No. 23, which resulted in the fan blade separating in flight and impacting the fan case. This impact caused the fan blade to fracture into fragments that traveled farther than expected into the inlet, which compromised the structural integrity of the inlet and led to the in-flight separation of inlet components. A portion of the inlet struck the fuselage and created a hole, causing the cabin to depressurize."

== See also ==
- Southwest Airlines Flight 1380 - A 2018 accident involving the same airline with an engine failure with a similar aircraft and engine causing one fatality.
