= TAM Airlines Flight 9755 =

2001 aviation accident in Brazil

TAM Linhas Aéreas Flight 9755
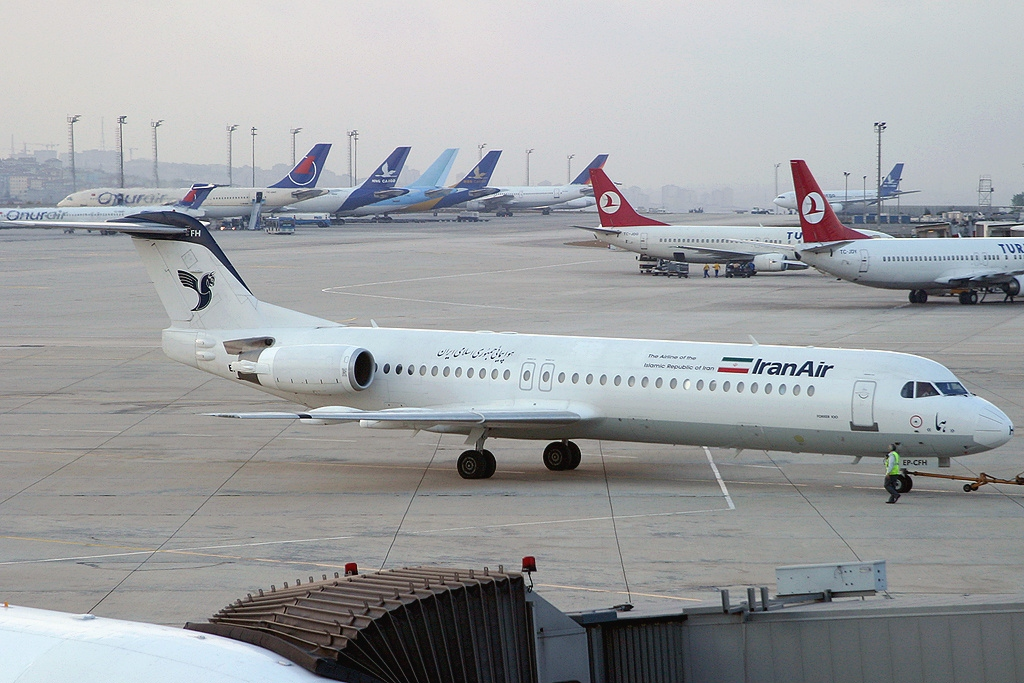
- The Fokker 100 involved in the accident while in service with Iran Air as EP-CFH in 2006

Accident
- Date: 15 September 2001
- Summary: Uncontained engine failure leading to uncontrolled decompression
- Site: Near Belo Horizonte, Minas Gerais, Brazil

Aircraft
- Aircraft type: Fokker 100
- Operator: TAM Linhas Aéreas
- IATA flight No.: JJ9755
- ICAO flight No.: TAM9755
- Call sign: TAM 9755
- Registration: PT-MRN
- Flight origin: Recife/Guararapes–Gilberto Freyre International Airport, Recife, Pernambuco, Brazil
- Destination: Viracopos International Airport, Campinas, Brazil
- Occupants: 88
- Passengers: 82
- Crew: 6
- Fatalities: 1
- Injuries: 3
- Survivors: 87

On Saturday 15 September 2001, TAM Linhas Aéreas Flight 9755, a Fokker 100 scheduled domestic passenger flight carrying 82 passengers and six crew, departed Recife/Guararapes–Gilberto Freyre International Airport for Viracopos International Airport. During the flight, the plane suffered an uncontained engine failure. Fragments of the engine shattered three cabin windows, causing decompression and blowing the passenger in seat 19E partly out of the plane. The passenger blown out of the window did not survive.

== Accident ==
The aircraft took off from Recife (SBRF) at 17:56, carrying 82 passengers and six crew, heading to Campinas (SBKP). About 70 nautical miles from Belo Horizonte, autothrottle disengaged and the right engine failed. This was followed by an explosive depressurization of the cabin caused by engine debris. Oxygen masks dropped in the cabin, some automatically, some through input by the co-pilot. The crew then initiated an emergency descent. The aircraft landed at 20:42 in Confins (SBCF). The aircraft had severe damage to the engine and light damage to the right wing and fuselage.

The accident investigators concluded that between two and five turbine blades failed, damaging the fan disk and the first three stages of the compressor moved outside the engine, which caused several turbine blades to move with it. One of these turbine blades ripped through the engine nacelle and through the fuselage, causing the aircraft to depressurize. One of the blades entered the aircraft through the window of seat 19, killing its occupant.

== Aftermath ==
TAM said in an official response that it will provide "all assistance to the victim's family, as well as to other passengers, including medical and psychological care."

The initial turbine blade failure was attributed to fatigue failure induced by flutter, as had been seen in two previous accidents on a flight departing from Cologne, Germany, in December of 1995 with engine TAY 651-54 and a flight preparing for take-off in 1997 with engine TAY 650-15.

== Aircraft ==
The aircraft was a Fokker 100 with the registration number PT-MRN, which was delivered in May 1994. The aircraft was repaired and returned to service and remain so until 2003. The engine was a Rolls-Royce TAY 650-15. After leaving TAM fleet, it ended up with Iran Air and was registered as EP-CFH in 2004. The aircraft has since been stored.

== See also ==
- British Airways Flight 5390
- Southwest Airlines Flight 1380
- Reeve Aleutian Airways Flight 8
- National Airlines Flight 27
