= Tammie Jo Shults =

Pioneer female US Naval Aviator

- Shults with a VAQ-34 F/A-18 Hornet in 1992
- Born: Tammie Jo Bonnell; November 2, 1961 (age 64); Tularosa, New Mexico, U.S.
- Education: MidAmerica Nazarene University (BSc)
- Spouse: Dean Shults (married 1988–present)
- Military career
- Allegiance: United States
- Branch: United States Navy
- Service years: 1985–2001
- Rank: Lieutenant commander
- Awards: Navy and Marine Corps Achievement Medal, National Defense Service Medal
- Other work: Commercial airline Boeing 737 pilot

Tammie Jo Shults (née Bonnell; born November 2, 1961) is an American retired airline captain, former naval aviator, and author. She was one of the first female fighter pilots to serve in the United States Navy. Following her active duty service, she became a pilot for Southwest Airlines until her retirement in 2020.

On April 17, 2018, as captain of Southwest Airlines Flight 1380, she safely landed a Boeing 737-700 after the aircraft suffered an engine failure with debris causing rapid decompression of the aircraft.

== Early life ==
Tammie Jo Bonnell was born on November 2, 1961, and grew up on a ranch near Tularosa, New Mexico. As a child, she watched jet aircraft from nearby Holloman Air Force Base practice maneuvers in the skies above her home. Watching these, along with reading about Nate Saint, inspired her to become a pilot. During her final year of high school, she investigated the possibility of a career in flying but was told that there were no professional women pilots.

Following high school graduation, she attended MidAmerica Nazarene College where she earned degrees in biology and agribusiness, graduating in 1983. While at MidAmerica, she met a woman who had qualified as a pilot for the United States Air Force and decided to see if the Air Force would accept her application for service. After being turned down by the Air Force, she decided to try the Navy while doing graduate studies at Western New Mexico University.

== Military career ==
Shults was accepted by the Navy for Aviation Officer Candidate School at Naval Air Station Pensacola. After completing the twelve-week course and receiving her commission as an ensign on June 21, 1985, Shults attended flight training, also at NAS Pensacola, where she trained and qualified for her pilot's wings in the T-34.

After Pensacola, Shults was stationed at Naval Air Station Chase Field as a flight instructor for the T-2 Buckeye. She later qualified in the A-7 Corsair II with training (RAG) squadron VA-122 at Naval Air Station Lemoore. Her next assignment was VAQ-34, a Tactical Electronic Warfare Squadron at the Pacific Missile Test Center located at Point Mugu, California. When the squadron relocated to NAS Lemoore in 1991, Shults became an instructor under the command of CAPT Rosemary Mariner, the first woman to command an operational air squadron. Shults became one of the first female naval aviators to qualify in the F/A-18 Hornet when the squadron transitioned from the EA-6B Prowler.

During Operation Desert Storm, the Combat Exclusion Policy at that time prevented women from flying combat sorties, so Shults flew training missions as an instructor aggressor pilot for naval aviators. She finished her tour of duty in March 1993.

In December 1995, she was promoted to lieutenant commander then transitioned to the Navy Reserve, where she flew the F/A-18 Hornet and EA-6B Prowler until August 2001. Her decorations include two Navy and Marine Corps Achievement Medals, a National Defense Service Medal, and a Marksmanship Medal.

== Civilian career ==
After leaving the Navy, Shults joined Southwest Airlines as a pilot, flying a part-time schedule of 8–10 days per month so that she could also raise a family following her marriage to fellow naval aviator Dean Shults.

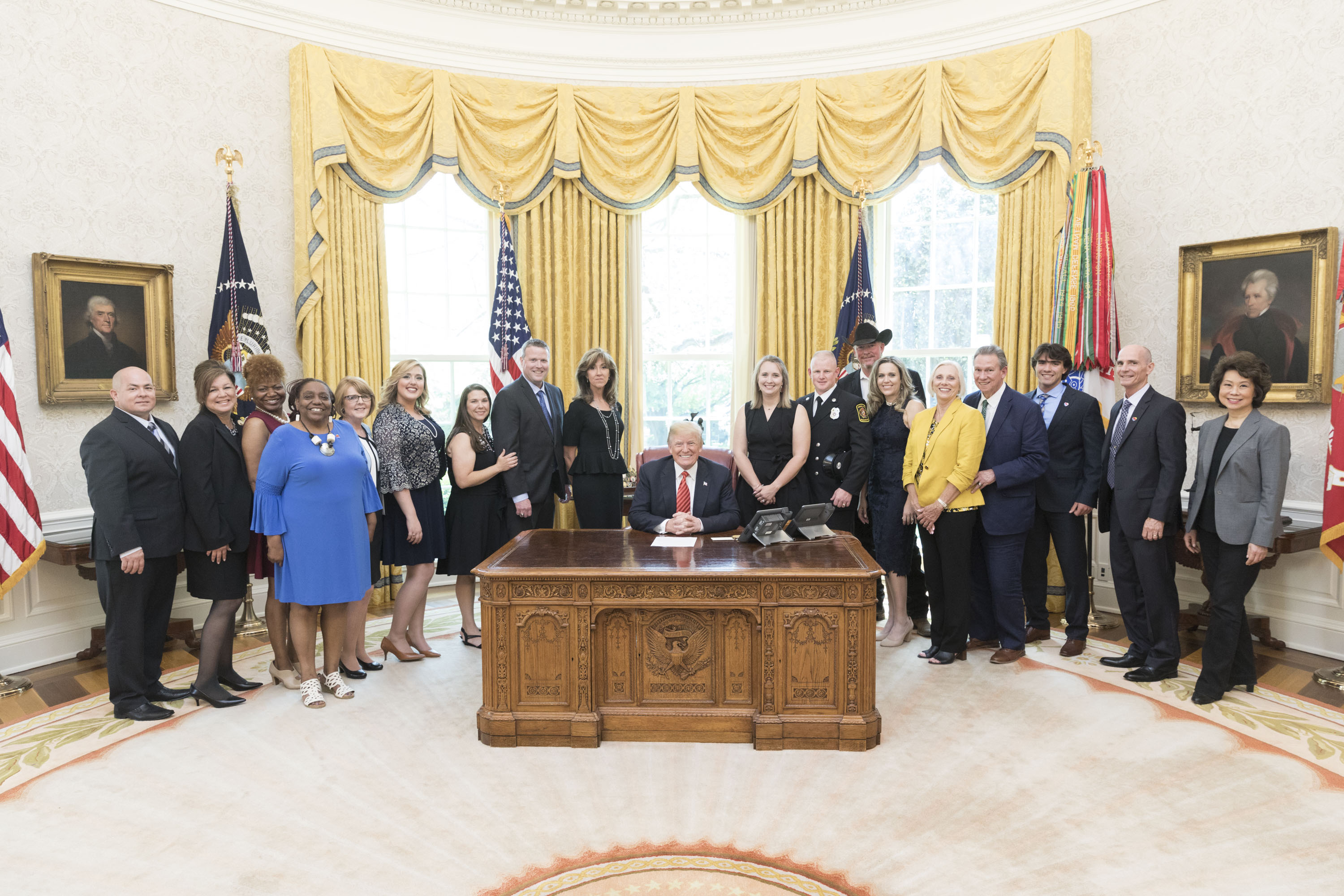
President Trump welcomes the crew and select passengers of Southwest Airlines Flight 1380 at the White House on May 1, 2018 (Shults first left of the President)

On April 17, 2018, while Shults was the captain commanding Flight 1380 from New York to Dallas, an engine fan blade on the Boeing 737 failed and flying debris damaged the left side of the fuselage and one side window; the window failed, causing the plane to decompress. One passenger, Jennifer Riordan, was partially sucked through the damaged window and was later pronounced dead at the hospital. Shults made an emergency descent and landed in Philadelphia. Her actions, calm demeanor, and competence during the emergency were noted by Southwest Airlines officials and passengers as well as Chesley Sullenberger, another commercial airline and former military pilot who controlled a similar situation in 2009 on US Airways Flight 1549.

Shults later revealed that she had not originally been scheduled to pilot the flight, but had swapped the shift with her husband. U.S. Representative and former US Air Force colonel and pilot Martha McSally introduced a resolution in Congress to honor Shults for her life-saving heroism and skill in landing her badly disabled aircraft. On December 10, 2020, Shults was inducted into the International Air & Space Hall of Fame.

== Personal life ==
In 1988, she married Dean Shults, at the time a fellow naval aviator in the A-7 Corsair II, who also joined Southwest Airlines as a pilot that year. Together, they have two children. The couple live in Boerne, Texas. Shults is a devout Christian who teaches Sunday school and helps the needy, such as internally displaced persons from Hurricane Rita.

Shults wrote a book about Flight 1380, Nerves of Steel, which was released in the United States on October 8, 2019.

== See also ==
- Sully Sullenberger, captain of US Airways Flight 1549 on January 15, 2009, when he ditched the plane, landing on the Hudson River after both engines were disabled by a bird strike.
- Tadeusz Wrona
