= Blue ice (aviation) =

Ice leaked from aircraft septic tanks

In aviation, blue ice is frozen sewage material that has leaked mid-flight from commercial aircraft lavatory waste systems. It is a mixture of human biowaste and liquid disinfectant that freezes at high altitude. The name comes from the blue color of the disinfectant. Airlines are not allowed to dump their waste tanks mid-flight, and pilots have no mechanism by which to do so; however, leaks sometimes do occur from a plane's septic tank.

== Danger of ground impact ==
There were at least 27 documented incidents of blue ice impacts in the United States between 1979 and 2003. These incidents typically happen under airport landing paths as the mass warms sufficiently to detach from the plane during its descent. A rare incident of falling blue ice causing damage to the roof of a home was reported on October 20, 2006, in Chino, California. A similar incident was reported in Leicester, England, in 2007.

Other documented incidents include:

- In 1971, a chunk of ice from an aircraft tore a large hole in the roof of the Essex Street Chapel in Kensington, London, and was one trigger for the demolition of the building.
- In November 2011, a chunk of ice, the size of an orange, broke through the roof of a private house in Ratingen-Hösel, Germany.
- In February 2013, a "football sized" ball of blue ice smashed through a conservatory roof in Clanfield, Hampshire, causing around £10,000 worth of damage.
- In December 2015, a 50 kg blue ice chunk crashed into the home of an elderly woman in Sagar district of Madhya Pradesh, India and injured her shoulder.
- In October 2016, a chunk of ice tore a hole in a private house in Amstelveen, The Netherlands.
- In two incidents in May 2018, chunks of blue ice fell onto residents in Kelowna, British Columbia.
- In November 2018, a chunk of ice fell from the sky and crashed through the roof of a home in Bristol, England.
- In June 2024, a chunk of ice crashed through a house in Paterson, New Jersey, within the flight path of Newark Liberty International Airport.
- In April 2026, a suspected piece of falling blue ice hit a man in the head in Malmö, Sweden, forcing him to go to the hospital with minor head trauma.

== Danger to aircraft ==
Blue ice can also be dangerous to the aircraft itself — the National Transportation Safety Board has recorded three very similar incidents where waste from lavatories caused damage to the leaking aircraft, all involving Boeing 727s. In all three cases, waste from a leaking lavatory hit one of the three engines the 727 has mounted in the rear, causing a power loss. The flights made safe emergency landings with the two remaining functioning engines; nobody was injured. Only one report specifically mentions ice, while another mentions "soft body FOD" (foreign object damage), indicating that the damage was caused by a relatively soft object like a bird, or even ice, as opposed to (for example) a stone or an object made of metal.

== In popular culture ==
- In the 3rd season finale of the series Six Feet Under, the Fisher family arranges a funeral for a woman struck and killed by a foot-sized piece of blue ice.
- A similar incident occurs in the 1996 television series Early Edition episode “Frostbite”, when the main character saves a man from being crushed by a chunk of blue ice.
- It was also mentioned in episodes of The Big Bang Theory and CSI: NY.
- The title of the 1992 film Blue Ice is a reference to the phenomenon.
- The 2001 film Joe Dirt finds the title character (played by David Spade) proudly displaying a large chunk of "blue ice" which he has mistaken for a meteorite.
- The topic has been covered on the TV show MANswers.
- Blue ice was also featured in an episode of the television series MythBusters.
- Blue ice is a cause of death in season 4 of 1000 Ways to Die.
- Blue ice also features in Series 6 Episode 1 of the BBC Series The Brittas Empire, in which a block of blue ice falls on the Whitbury Newtown Leisure Centre.

== See also ==
- Parts departing aircraft
