= National Airlines Flight 27 =

1973 aviation incident

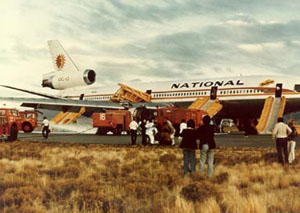
- Flight 27 after the emergency landing at the Sunport

Accident
- Date: November 3, 1973
- Summary: Uncontained engine failure; explosive decompression
- Site: En route over New Mexico; 35.044°N 106.595°W

Aircraft
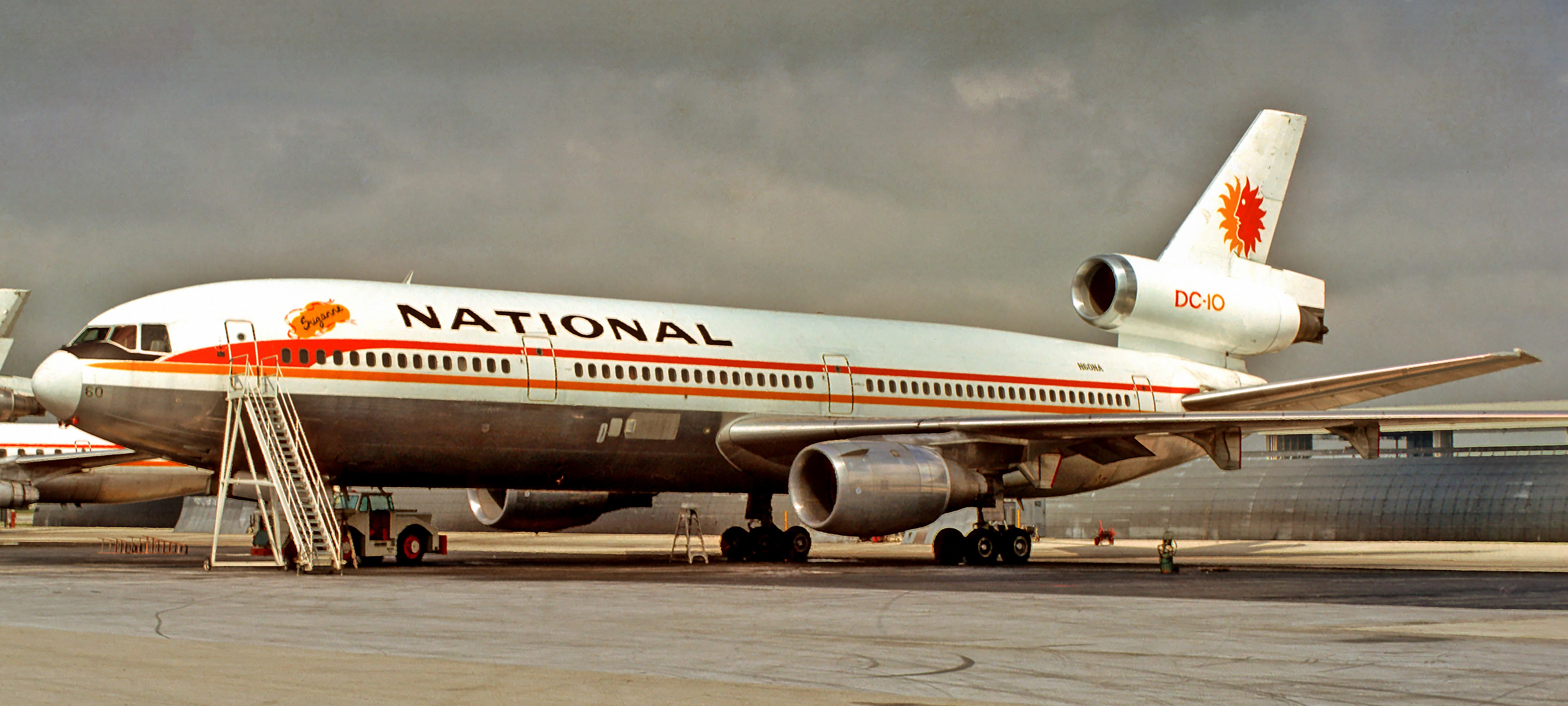
- N60NA, the aircraft involved in the accident, photographed in October 1974 after being repaired
- Aircraft type: McDonnell Douglas DC-10-10
- Aircraft name: Barbara
- Operator: National Airlines (NA)
- Registration: N60NA
- Flight origin: Miami International Airport
- 1st stopover: New Orleans International Airport
- 2nd stopover: Houston Intercontinental Airport
- 3rd stopover: McCarran International Airport
- Destination: San Francisco International Airport
- Occupants: 128
- Passengers: 116
- Crew: 12
- Fatalities: 1
- Injuries: 24
- Survivors: 127

National Airlines Flight 27 was a scheduled passenger flight in the United States between Miami, Florida, and San Francisco, California, with intermediate stops at New Orleans, Houston, and Las Vegas.

On November 3, 1973, the aircraft involved, a McDonnell Douglas DC-10-10 with the tail number N60NA (as Barbara), experienced an uncontained engine failure, causing significant damage to the plane. The aircraft later managed to make a safe emergency landing in New Mexico at the Albuquerque International Sunport. One passenger died after being ejected from the aircraft at cruising altitude, in addition to minor injuries sustained by twenty-four passengers. It was the first fatal accident involving a DC-10.

== Flight crew ==
The captain of Flight 27 was William R. Broocke, who had been employed by National Airlines since 1946 and had qualified to fly the McDonnell Douglas DC-10 in 1972, accumulating 21,853 flight hours during his career with 801 hours on the DC-10. First Officer Eddie H. Saunders, had been employed by National Airlines since 1965, with 7,086 flight hours of which 445 hours were on the DC-10. Flight Engineer Golden W. Hanks, employed by National Airlines since 1950, with 17,814 flight hours of which 1,252 flight hours were on the DC-10.

== Accident ==
On November 3, 1973, Flight 27 took off from Houston, Texas, bound for Las Vegas International Airport. The aircraft leveled off at 39,000 feet (11,900 m) with an indicated airspeed of 257 knots (296 mph; 476 km/h).

At about 16:40 MST, while at cruising altitude, 65 miles (56 nmi; 105 km) southwest of Albuquerque, New Mexico, the No. 3 (starboard) engine fan assembly disintegrated in an uncontained engine failure. Fragments of the broken fan assembly, ejected at high speed, penetrated the right wing, the fuselage, and both remaining engine nacelles. One cabin window was dislodged by debris, cabin pressure ejected the adjacent passenger from the aircraft. This damage caused decompression of the cabin, and the loss of certain electrical and hydraulic systems.

The flight crew initiated an emergency descent, and the aircraft landed safely at Albuquerque International Sunport nineteen minutes after the engine failed. 115 passengers and 12 crew members exited the aircraft by using the evacuation slides.

== Casualties ==
Of the 116 passengers on board, 24 people were treated by medical personnel from nearby Kirtland Air Force Base for smoke inhalation, ear problems, and minor abrasions.

One passenger was partially blown into the opening made by the failed cabin window, after it was struck by engine fragments. He was temporarily retained in that position by his seatbelt. "According to a witness...efforts to pull the passenger back into the airplane by another passenger were unsuccessful, and the occupant of seat 17H was subsequently forced entirely through the cabin window."

The New Mexico State Police and local organizations searched extensively for the missing passenger, George F. Gardner of Beaumont, Texas, who was blown out of the window. Computer analysis was made of the possible falling trajectories, which narrowed the search pattern. However, the search effort was unsuccessful. A ranch hand later found a pair of sunglasses and a tobacco pipe while working on a ranch near Alamo, New Mexico. He turned over the items to state police, and the family of the missing passenger identified them as belonging to him.

== Investigation ==
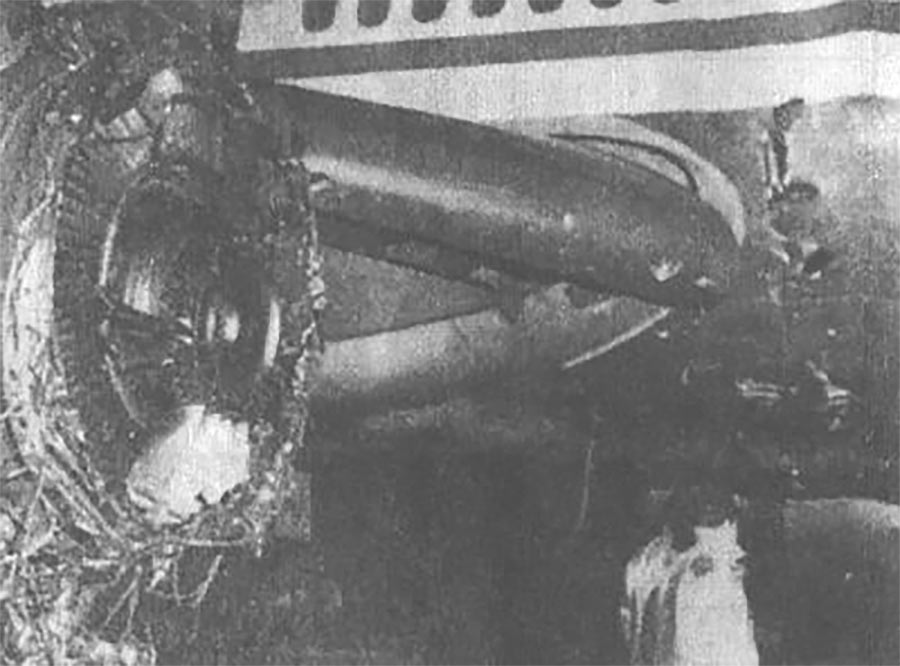
Damage to the aircraft caused by the engine failure

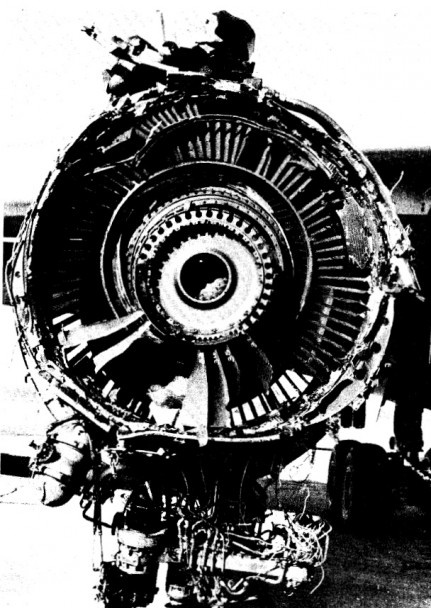
N60NA's No.3 engine after the failure, showing the remains of the failed fan assembly

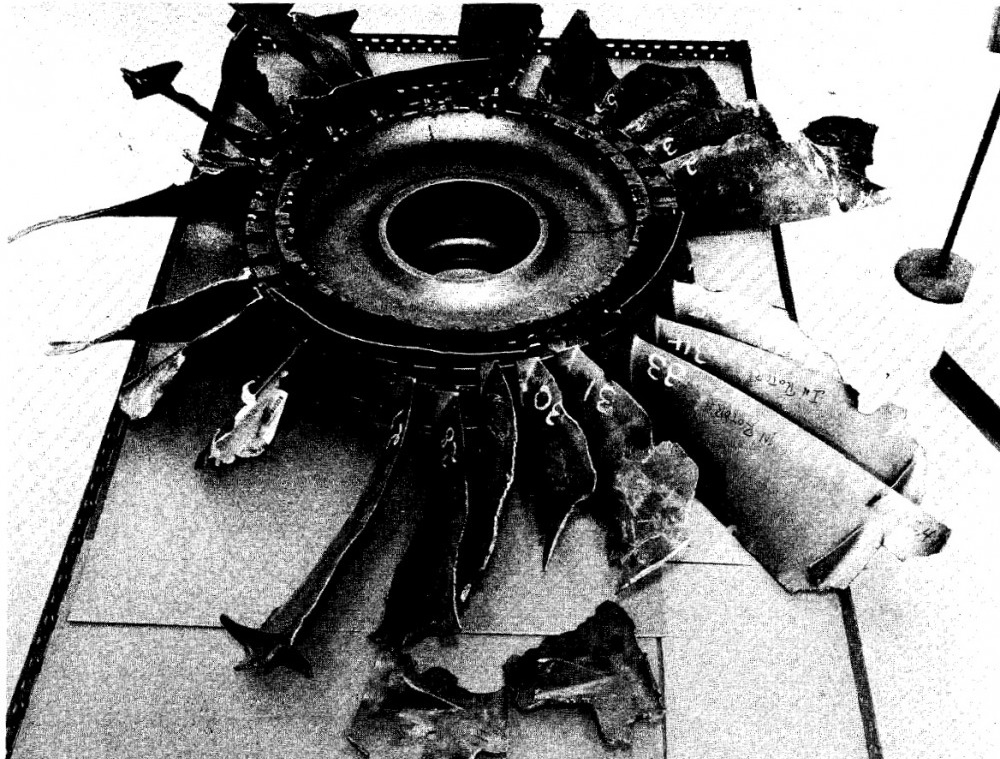
Reconstructed fan assembly that caused the engine failure

The National Transportation Safety Board (NTSB) determined the probable cause of this accident was the disintegration of the No. 3 engine fan assembly as a result of an interaction between the fan blade tips and the fan case. According to the NTSB, "the precise reason or reasons for the acceleration and the onset of the destructive vibration could not be determined conclusively", but enough was learned to prevent the occurrence of similar events. The speed of the engine at the time of the accident caused a resonance wave to occur in the fan assembly when the tips of the fan blades began to make contact with the surrounding shroud. The engine was designed to have a rearward blade retaining force of 18,000 pounds-force (80 kN) to prevent the blades from moving forward in their mountings slots and subsequently departing from the fan disk. The rearward force was not enough. As a result, General Electric re-designed the engine to increase the blade retaining capability to 60,000 pounds-force (270 kN), This change was subsequently incorporated into all engines in service.

In addition to this incident, it was found that between August 8 and September 12, 1973, there had been fifteen problems reported with the number 3 engine. The engine had been removed from the aircraft for repairs, and between the time it was replaced and the accident, a further twenty-six faults had been reported by the flight crew. It was found that the bolts that held the front covering, failed in the accident, and did not meet the required tolerance. An engineering team was sent to inspect these engines, and six more discrepancies were found in the National Airlines fleet alone. This inspection was therefore made compulsory for all early DC-10s to prevent the issue from re-occurring.

The NTSB expressed concern about the flight crew conducting an unauthorized experiment on the auto-throttle system. They wondered where the system obtained engine power readings from, and, to see if it was the N1 tachometer readout, "the flight engineer pulled the three N1 tachometers [circuit breakers]" and then adjusted the autothrottle setting. The cockpit voice recorder showed that the engines altered their power setting when requested, proving to the crew that the system was powered from another source. The crew then manually reset the throttles to the normal cruising power before the flight engineer had closed the tachometer circuit breakers. A consideration was whether the crew had accidentally over-sped the engine when setting power without the tachometers, but there was insufficient evidence to prove this. Nonetheless, "regardless of the cause of the high fan speed at the time of the fan failure, the Safety Board is concerned that the flight crew was, in effect, performing an untested failure analysis on this system. This type of experimentation, without the benefit of training or specific guidelines, should never be performed during passenger flight operations."
