= Fluorescent penetrant inspection =

Non-destructive inspection method, type of dye penetrant inspection

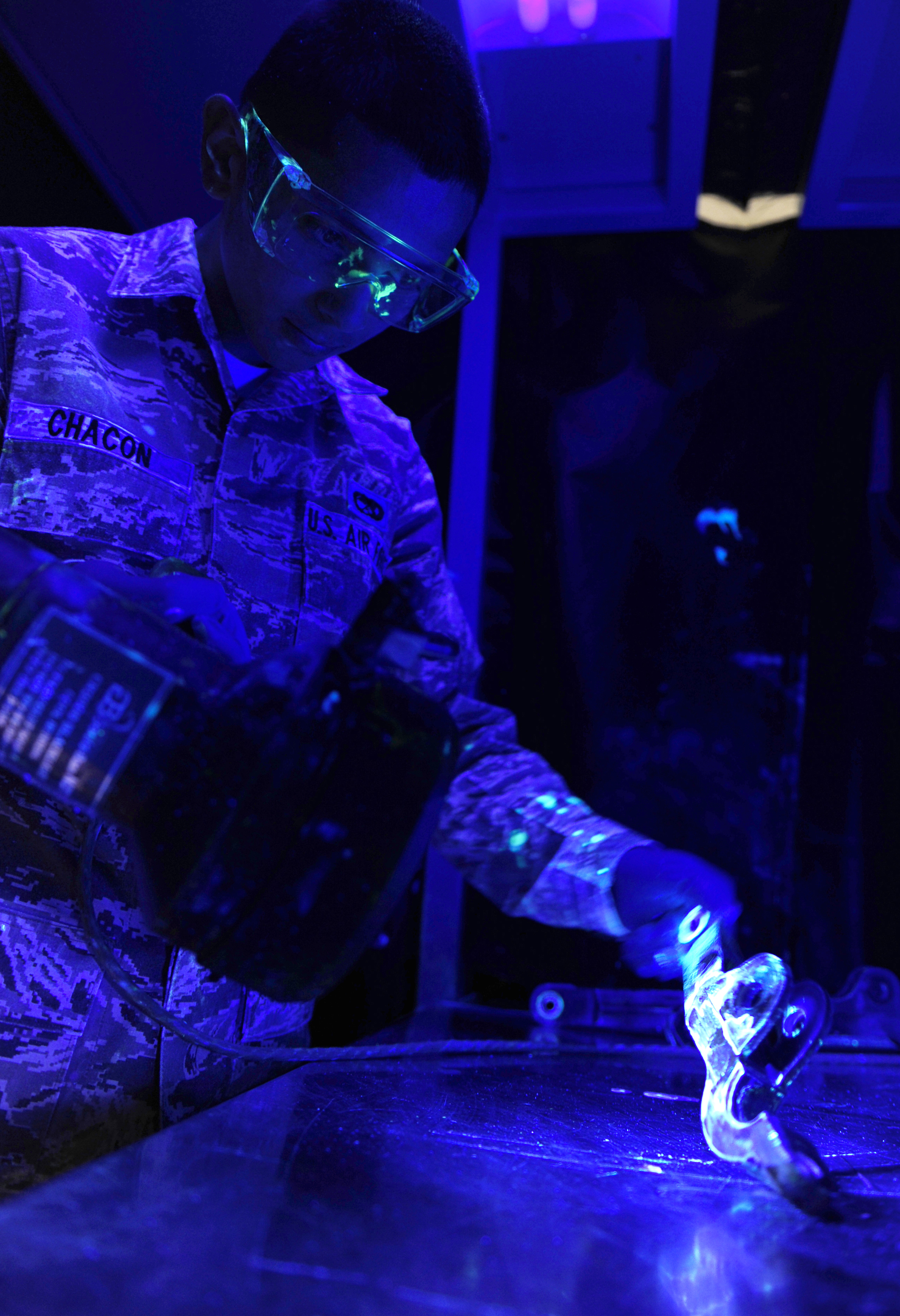
Liquid penetrant inspection of non-magnetic aircraft metal parts.

Fluorescent penetrant inspection (FPI) is a type of dye penetrant inspection in which a fluorescent dye is applied to the surface of a non-porous material in order to detect defects that may compromise the integrity or quality of the part in question. FPI is noted for its low cost and simple process, and is used widely in a variety of industries.

== Materials ==
There are many types of dye used in penetrant inspections. FPI operations use a dye much more sensitive to smaller flaws than penetrants used in other DPI procedures. This is because of the nature of the fluorescent penetrant that is applied. With its brilliant yellow glow caused by its reaction with ultraviolet radiation, FPI dye sharply contrasts with the dark background. A vivid reference to even minute flaws is easily observed by a skilled inspector.

Because of its sensitivity to such small defects, FPI is ideal for most metals which tend to have small, tight pores and smooth surfaces. Defects can vary but are typically tiny cracks caused by processes used to shape and form the metal. It is not unusual for a part to be inspected several times before it is finished (an inspection often follows each significant forming operation).

Selection of inspection type is, of course, largely based on the material in question. FPI is a nondestructive inspection process and is therefore important that a dye and process are selected that ensure the part is not subjected to anything that may cause damage or staining.

== Inspection steps ==
There are six main steps in a fluorescent penetrant inspection process:

=== Step 1: Initial cleaning ===
Before the penetrant can be applied to the surface of the material in question one must ensure that the surface is free of any contamination such as paint, oil, dirt, or scale that may fill a defect or falsely indicate a flaw. Chemical treatment with solvents or reactive agents can be used to rid the surface of undesired contaminants and ensure good penetration when the penetrant is applied. Sometimes also drying at up to 100 °C in the oven and cooling down to 40 °C. Sandblasting to remove paint from a surface prior to the FPI process may mask (smear material over) cracks making the penetrant not effective. Even if the part has already been through a previous FPI operation it is imperative that it is cleaned again. Most penetrants are not compatible and therefore will thwart any attempt to identify defects that are already penetrated by any other penetrant. This process of cleaning is critical because if the surface of the part is not properly prepared to receive the penetrant, defective product may be moved on for further processing. This can cause lost time and money in reworking, over-processing, or even scrapping a finished part at final inspection.

=== Step 2: Penetrant application ===
The fluorescent penetrant is applied to the surface and allowed time to seep into flaws or defects in the material. The process of waiting for the penetrant to seep into flaws is called dwell time. Dwell time varies by material, the size of the indications that are intended to be identified and requirements / standards but is generally less than 30 minutes. It requires much less time to penetrate larger flaws because the penetrant is able to soak in much faster. The opposite is true for smaller flaws/defects.

=== Step 3: Excess penetrant removal ===
After the identified dwell time has passed, penetrant on the outer surface of the material is then removed. This highly controlled process is necessary in order to ensure that the penetrant is removed only from the surface of the material and not from inside any identified flaws. Various chemicals can be used for such a process and vary by specific penetrant types. Depending on the process sequence, an intermediate "emulsifying" step including post-washing takes place here when the emulsifying process is used. Important: The penetrant remains in the cracks regardless of which method is used. Typically, the cleaner is applied to a lint-free cloth that is used to carefully clean the surface.

=== Step 4: Developer application ===
Having removed excess penetrant, a contrasting developer may be applied to the surface. This serves as a background against which flaws can more readily be detected. The developer causes penetrant that is still in any defects to surface and bleed as well. These two attributes allow defects to be easily detected upon inspection. Dwell time is then allowed for the developer to achieve desired results before inspection.

=== Step 5: Inspection ===
In the case of fluorescent inspection, the inspector will use ultraviolet radiation with an intensity appropriate to the intent of the inspection operation. This must take place in a dark room to ensure good contrast between the glow emitted by the penetrant in the defected areas and the unlit surface of the material. The inspector carefully examines all surfaces in question and records any concerns. Areas in question may be marked so that location of indications can be identified easily without the use of the UV lighting. The inspection should occur at a given point in time after the application of the developer. Too short a time and the flaws may not be fully blotted, too long and the blotting may make proper interpretation difficult.

=== Step 6: Final cleaning ===
Upon successful inspection of the product, it is returned for a final cleaning before it is either shipped, moved on to another process, or deemed defective and reworked or scrapped. Note that a flawed part may not go through the final cleaning process if it is considered not to be cost effective.

== Advantages ==
- Highly sensitive fluorescent penetrant is ideal for even the smallest imperfections
- Low cost and potentially high-volume
- Suitable for inspection of non-magnetic materials and electrical insulators.
- Mobile and flexible testing method
- Only one work process is necessary to visualize all errors on the surface

== Disadvantages ==
- The method requires thorough cleaning of the inspected items. Inadequate cleaning may prevent detection of discontinuities.
- Test materials can be damaged if compatibility is not ensured. The operator or their supervisor should verify compatibility on the tested material, especially when considering the testing of plastic components and ceramics. The method is unsuitable for testing porous ceramics.
- Penetrant stains clothes and skin and must be treated with care
- The method is limited to surface defects
- Training is required for the inspector
- The part surface must be free of plate and paint
- Radiation protection regulations have to be observed for the inspection with UV-LED lamps

== Sources ==
- Manufacturing Processes Reference Guide, Industrial Press Inc. 1994
- Tech Results
- ASTM E 1417 Standard practice for liquid penetrant examination
- ISO 3452-1 Non-destructive testing - Penetrant testing - Part 1: General principles
- ISO 3452-2 Non-destructive testing - Penetrant testing - Part 2: Testing of penetrant materials (ISO 3452-2:2013)
