= Turbine engine failure =

Unexpected loss of power

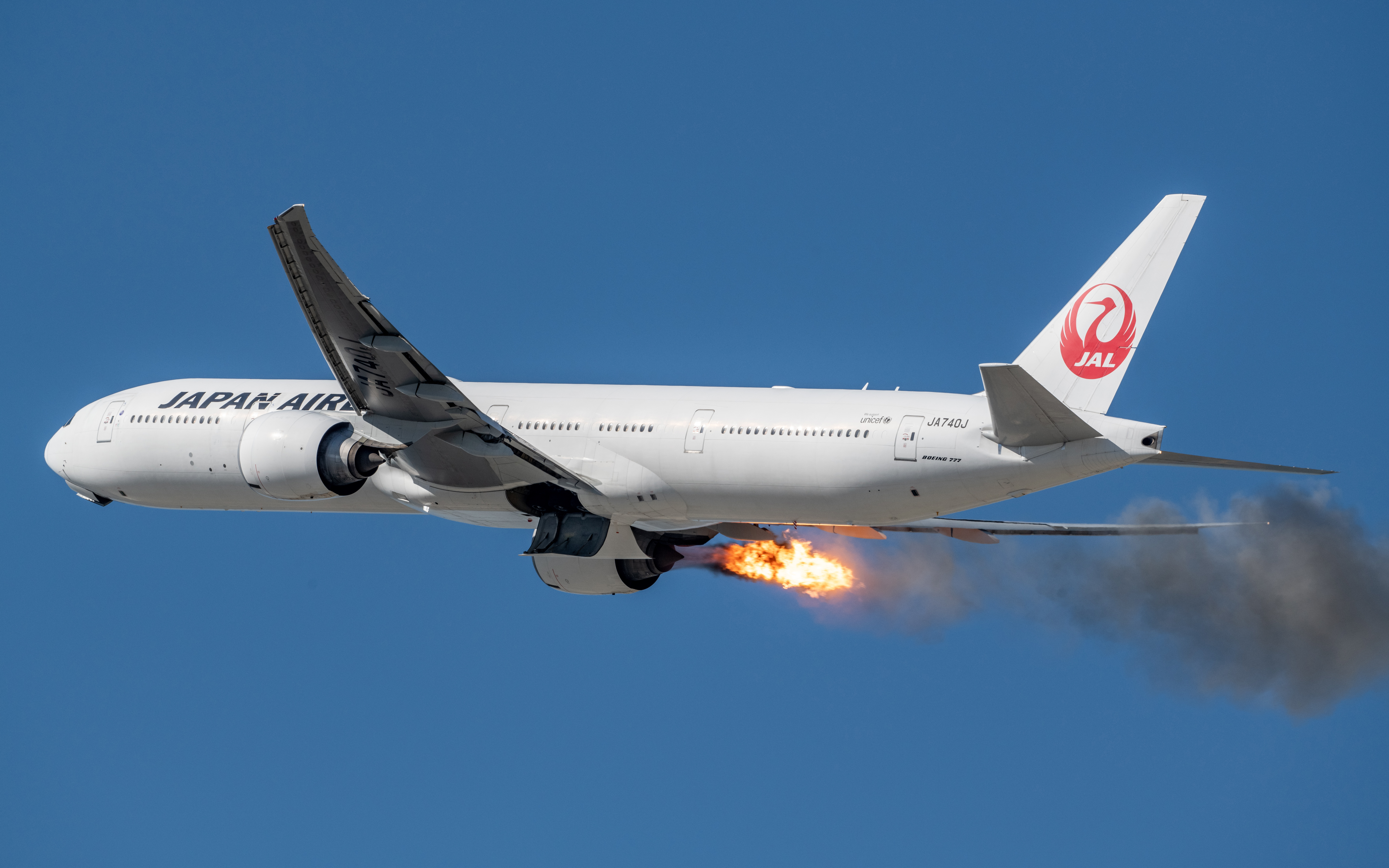
A Japan Airlines Boeing 777-300ER suffering engine failure during a 2021 take-off.

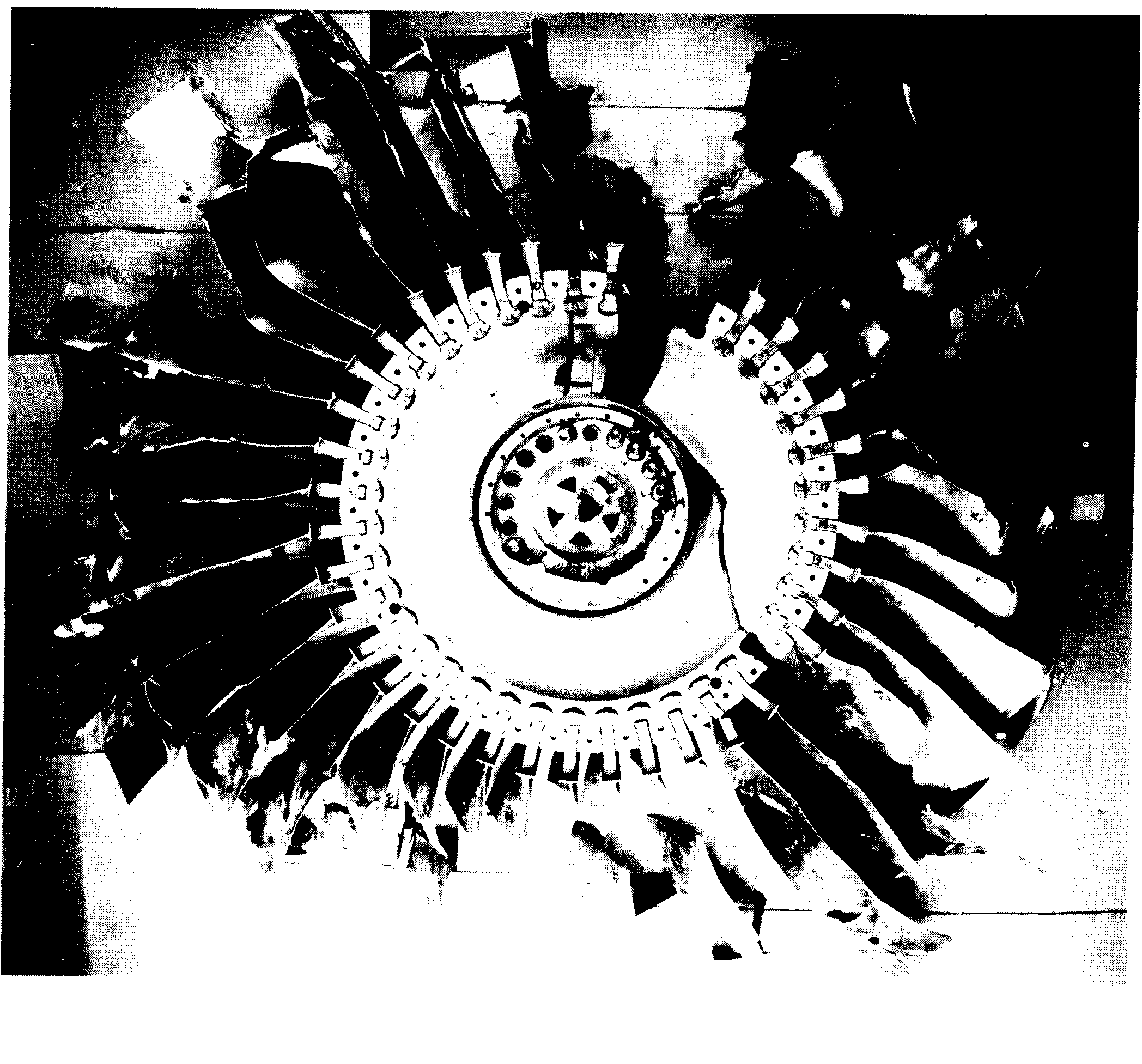
The damaged fan disk of the engine that catastrophically failed on United Airlines Flight 232

A turbine engine failure occurs when a gas turbine engine unexpectedly stops producing power due to a malfunction other than fuel exhaustion. It often applies for aircraft, but other turbine engines can also fail, such as ground-based turbines used in power plants or combined diesel and gas vessels and vehicles.

== Reliability ==
Turbine engines in use on today's turbine-powered aircraft are very reliable. Engines operate efficiently with regularly scheduled inspections and maintenance. These units can have lives ranging in the tens of thousands of hours of operation. However, engine malfunctions or failures occasionally occur that require an engine to be shut down in flight. Since multi-engine airplanes are designed to fly with one engine inoperative and flight crews are trained for that situation, the in-flight shutdown of an engine typically does not constitute a serious safety of flight issue.

The Federal Aviation Administration (FAA) was quoted as stating turbine engines have a failure rate of one per 375,000 flight hours, compared to of one every 3,200 flight hours for aircraft piston engines. Due to "gross under-reporting" of general aviation piston engines in-flight shutdowns (IFSD), the FAA has no reliable data and assessed the rate "between 1 per 1,000 and 1 per 10,000 flight hours". Continental Motors reports the FAA states general aviation engines experience one failures or IFSD every 10,000 flight hours, and states its Centurion engines failure is one per 20,704 flight hours, lowering to one per 163,934 flight hours in 2013–2014.

The General Electric GE90 has an in-flight shutdown rate (IFSD) of one per million engine flight-hours. The Pratt & Whitney Canada PT6 is known for its reliability with an in-flight shutdown rate of one per 333,333 hours from 1963 to 2016, lowering to one per 651,126 hours over 12 months in 2016.

=== Emergency landing ===
Following an engine shutdown, a precautionary landing is usually performed with airport fire and rescue equipment positioned near the runway. The prompt landing is a precaution against the risk that another engine will fail later in the flight or that the engine failure that has already occurred may have caused or been caused by other as-yet unknown damage or malfunction of aircraft systems (such as fire or damage to aircraft flight controls) that may pose a continuing risk to the flight. Once the aircraft lands, fire department personnel assist with inspecting the aircraft to ensure it is safe before it taxis to its parking position.

=== Rotorcraft ===
Turboprop-powered aircraft and turboshaft-powered helicopters are also powered by turbine engines and are subject to engine failures for many similar reasons as jet-powered aircraft. In the case of an engine failure in a helicopter, it is often possible for the pilot to enter autorotation, using the unpowered rotor to slow the aircraft's descent and provide a measure of control, usually allowing for a safe emergency landing even without engine power.

== Shutdowns that are not engine failures ==
Most in-flight shutdowns are harmless and likely to go unnoticed by passengers. For example, it may be prudent for the flight crew to shut down an engine and perform a precautionary landing in the event of a low oil pressure or high oil temperature warning in the cockpit. However, passengers in a jet powered aircraft may become quite alarmed by other engine events such as a compressor surge — a malfunction that is typified by loud bangs and even flames from the engine's inlet and tailpipe. A compressor surge is a disruption of the airflow through a gas turbine jet engine that can be caused by engine deterioration, a crosswind over the engine's inlet, ice accumulation around the engine inlet, ingestion of foreign material, or an internal component failure such as a broken blade. While this situation can be alarming, the engine may recover with no damage.

Other events that can happen with jet engines, such as a fuel control fault, can result in excess fuel in the engine's combustor. This additional fuel can result in flames extending from the engine's exhaust pipe. As alarming as this would appear, at no time is the engine itself actually on fire.

Also, the failure of certain components in the engine may result in a release of oil into bleed air that can cause an odor or oily mist in the cabin. This is known as a fume event. The dangers of fume events are the subject of debate in both aviation and medicine.

== Possible causes ==
Engine failures can be caused by mechanical problems in the engine itself, such as damage to portions of the turbine or oil leaks, as well as damage outside the engine such as fuel pump problems or fuel contamination. A turbine engine failure can also be caused by entirely external factors, such as volcanic ash, bird strikes or weather conditions like precipitation or icing. Weather risks such as these can sometimes be countered through the usage of supplementary ignition or anti-icing systems.

== Failures during takeoff ==
A turbine-powered aircraft's takeoff procedure is designed around ensuring that an engine failure will not endanger the flight. This is done by planning the takeoff around three critical V speeds, V1, VR and V2. V1 is the critical engine failure recognition speed, the speed at which a takeoff can be continued with an engine failure, and the speed at which stopping distance is no longer guaranteed in the event of a rejected takeoff. VR is the speed at which the nose is lifted off the runway, a process known as rotation. V2 is the single-engine safety speed, the single engine climb speed. The use of these speeds ensure that either sufficient thrust to continue the takeoff, or sufficient stopping distance to reject it will be available at all times.

== Failure during extended operations ==
In order to allow twin-engined aircraft to fly longer routes that are over an hour from a suitable diversion airport, a set of rules known as ETOPS (extended twin-engine operational performance standards) is used to ensure a twin turbine engine powered aircraft is able to safely arrive at a diversionary airport after an engine failure or shutdown, as well as to minimize the risk of a failure. ETOPS includes maintenance requirements, such as frequent and meticulously logged inspections and operation requirements such as flight crew training and ETOPS-specific procedures.

== Contained and uncontained failures ==
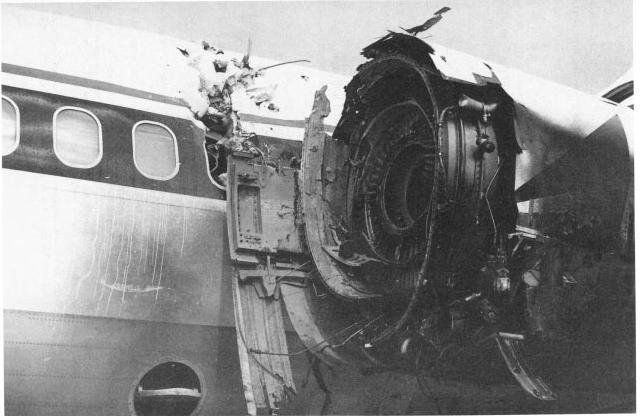
The engine of Delta Air Lines Flight 1288 after it experienced catastrophic uncontained compressor rotor failure in 1996.

Engine failures may be classified as either as "contained" or "uncontained".

- A contained engine failure is one in which all internal rotating components remain within or embedded in the engine's case (including any containment wrapping that is part of the engine), or exit the engine through the tail pipe or air inlet.
- An uncontained engine failure is one in which fragments of rotating engine parts escape by penetrating the engine case.

The very specific technical distinction between a contained and uncontained engine failure derives from regulatory requirements for design, testing, and certification of aircraft engines under Part 33 of the US Federal Aviation Regulations, which has always required turbine aircraft engines to be designed to contain damage resulting from rotor blade failure. Under Part 33, engine manufacturers are required to perform blade off tests to ensure containment of shrapnel if blade separation occurs. Blade fragments exiting the inlet or exhaust can still pose a hazard to the aircraft, and this should be considered by the aircraft designers. A nominally contained engine failure can still result in engine parts departing the aircraft as long as the engine parts exit via the existing openings in the engine inlet or outlet, and do not create new openings in the engine case containment. Fan blade fragments departing via the inlet may also cause airframe parts such as the inlet duct and other parts of the engine nacelle to depart the aircraft due to deformation from the fan blade fragment's residual kinetic energy.

The containment of failed rotating parts is a complex process which involves high energy, high speed interactions of numerous locally and remotely located engine components (e.g., failed blade, other blades, containment structure, adjacent cases, bearings, bearing supports, shafts, vanes, and externally mounted components). Once the failure event starts, secondary events of a random nature may occur whose course and ultimate conclusion cannot be precisely predicted. Some of the structural interactions that have been observed to affect containment are the deformation and/or deflection of blades, cases, rotor, frame, inlet, casing rub strips, and the containment structure.

Uncontained turbine engine disk failures within an aircraft engine present a direct hazard to an airplane and its crew and passengers because high-energy disk fragments can penetrate the cabin or fuel tanks, damage flight control surfaces, or sever flammable fluid or hydraulic lines. Engine cases are not designed to contain failed turbine disks. Instead, the risk of uncontained disk failure is mitigated by designating disks as safety-critical parts, defined as the parts of an engine whose failure is likely to present a direct hazard to the aircraft.

=== Notable uncontained engine failure accidents ===
- National Airlines Flight 27: a McDonnell Douglas DC-10 flying from Miami to San Francisco in 1973 had an overspeed failure of a General Electric CF6-6, resulting in one fatality.
- Two LOT Polish Airlines flights, both Ilyushin Il-62s, suffered catastrophic uncontained engine failures in the 1980s. The first was in 1980 on LOT Polish Airlines Flight 7 where flight controls were destroyed, killing all 87 on board. In 1987, on LOT Polish Airlines Flight 5055, the failure of the aircraft's inner left (#2) engine damaged the outer left (#1) engine, setting both on fire and causing loss of flight controls, leading to a crash that killed all 183 people on board. In both cases, the turbine shaft in engine #2 disintegrated due to production defects in the engines' bearings, which were missing rollers.
- The Tu-154 crash near Krasnoyarsk was a major crash that occurred on Sunday, 23 December 1984. The Tu-154B-2 airliner of the 1st Krasnoyarsk united aviation unit (Aeroflot) was beginning the Krasnoyarsk-Irkutsk route of passenger flight SU3519; during the climb, engine No. 3 failed. The crew decided to return to the airport, but during the landing approach a fire broke out and destroyed the control systems. The plane crashed to the ground 3200 meters from the threshold of the runway of the Yemelyanovo airport and collapsed. Of the 111 people on board (104 passengers and 7 crew members), one survived. The cause of the catastrophe was the destruction of the first-stage disk on the low-pressure circuit of engine No. 3, which occurred due to the presence of fatigue cracks where one area of the disk had a higher microhardness than the rest of the disk. The methods used at that time for the manufacture, repair, and quality control of the disks were found to be partially obsolete, and those methods had allowed the defect to occur and to go undetected. The defect itself probably arose from accidental inclusion of a piece of nitrogen-enriched titanium during manufacturing.
- Cameroon Airlines Flight 786: a Boeing 737 flying between Douala and Garoua, Cameroon in 1984 had a failure of a Pratt & Whitney JT8D-15 engine. Two people died.
- British Airtours Flight 28M: a Boeing 737 flying from Manchester to Corfu in 1985 suffered an uncontained engine failure and fire during takeoff. The takeoff was aborted, the plane turned onto a taxiway, and an evacuation began, but fifty-five passengers and crew were unable to escape and died of smoke inhalation. The accident led to major changes to improve the survivability of aircraft evacuations.
- United Airlines Flight 232: a McDonnell Douglas DC-10 flying from Denver to Chicago in 1989. The failure of the rear General Electric CF6-6 engine caused the loss of all hydraulics, forcing the pilots to attempt a landing using differential thrust. There were 111 fatalities among the 296 people on board. Prior to this crash, the probability of a simultaneous failure of all three hydraulic systems was considered as low as one in a billion. However, those statistical models did not account for the position of the number-two engine, mounted at the tail close to hydraulic lines of all three of the systems, nor the results if fragments were released in many directions. Since then, aircraft engine designs have focused on keeping shrapnel from puncturing the cowling or ductwork, increasingly using high-strength composite materials to achieve penetration resistance while keeping the weight low.
- Baikal Airlines Flight 130: a starter of engine No. 2 on a Tu-154 heading from Irkutsk to Domodedovo, Moscow in 1994, failed to stop after the engine had been started, and continued to operate at over 40,000 rpm with open bleed valves from engines, which caused an uncontained failure of the starter. A detached turbine disk damaged fuel and oil supply lines (which started a fire) and hydraulic lines. The fire-extinguishing system failed to stop the fire, and the plane diverted back to Irkutsk. However, the crew lost control of the plane due to lack of hydraulic pressure, and it crashed into a dairy farm killing all 124 on board and one on the ground.
- ValuJet Flight 597: A DC-9-32 taking off from Hartsfield Jackson Atlanta International Airport on 8 June 1995 suffered an uncontained engine failure from a 7th-stage high pressure compressor disk, which had become corroded and had not been adequately inspected. The resulting rupture caused jet fuel to flow into the cabin and ignite, and the fire caused the jet to be a write-off.
- Delta Air Lines Flight 1288: a McDonnell Douglas MD-88 flying from Pensacola, Florida to Atlanta in 1996 had a cracked compressor rotor hub failure on one of its Pratt & Whitney JT8D-219 engines. Two people died.
- TAM Flight 9755: a Fokker 100, departing Recife/Guararapes–Gilberto Freyre International Airport for São Paulo/Guarulhos International Airport on 15 September 2001 suffered an uncontained engine failure in which fragments of the Rolls-Royce RB.183 Tay engine shattered three cabin windows, causing decompression that pulled one passenger partly out of the plane. Another passenger managed to hold on to that passenger until the aircraft landed, but the passenger who had been partly outside the plane died.
- Qantas Flight 32: an Airbus A380 flying from London Heathrow to Sydney (via Singapore) in 2010 had an uncontained failure in a Rolls-Royce Trent 900 engine. The failure was found to have been caused by a misaligned counter bore within a stub oil pipe leading to a fatigue fracture. This in turn led to an oil leak followed by an oil fire in the engine. The fire led to the release of the intermediate pressure turbine (IPT) disc. The airplane landed safely. This failure led to the grounding of the entire Qantas A380 fleet.
- British Airways Flight 2276: a Boeing 777-200ER flying from Las Vegas to London in 2015 suffered an uncontained engine failure on its #1 GE90 engine during takeoff, resulting in a large fire on its port side. The takeoff was successfully aborted and the plane was evacuated with no fatalities.
- American Airlines Flight 383: a Boeing 767-300ER flying from Chicago to Miami in 2016 suffered an uncontained engine failure on its #2 engine (General Electric CF6) during takeoff resulting in a large fire which destroyed the outer part of the right wing. The takeoff was aborted and the aircraft was evacuated, with 21 minor injuries and no fatalities.
- Air France Flight 66: an Airbus A380 registration F-HPJE, flying from Paris, France, to Los Angeles, United States, was about 200 nautical miles (230 mi; 370 km) southeast of Nuuk, Greenland, when it suffered a catastrophic engine failure in 2017 (General Electric / Pratt & Whitney Engine Alliance GP7000). The crew made a safe landing at Goose Bay, Canada, about two hours later.
