= Parts departing aircraft =

Aviation safety hazard

In aviation safety, parts departing aircraft or parts detached from aeroplanes (PDA), also known as objects falling off airplanes (OFA), things falling off aircraft (TFOA), and other analogous variations, can range from small fasteners like screws and rivets up to major sub-assemblies like hatch covers and doors. PDA are a safety concern because they may be critical parts needed to continue safe flight, may damage other critical parts of the aircraft as they depart, may cause foreign object damage to other aircraft, or may cause serious injuries or damage to people and property on the ground. These occurrences are a longstanding worldwide problem in aviation.

In a 2018 study, the European Aviation Safety Agency concluded that the likelihood of fatally injuring people on the ground due to a PDA event is low enough that it does not constitute an unsafe condition according to their standards; they also noted the absence of any people fatally injured from PDA. But in Japan, preventing objects falling off airplanes is required by all air carriers after a series of serious incidents at Haneda Airport which is close to Tokyo.

Regardless of whether PDA are considered acceptable risk by aviation regulators, things that fall from the sky are generally not well tolerated outside the aviation community. The United States Navy found complaints about TFOA increased as residential development has encroached around naval air stations. Leaking aviation lavatory liquids have been known to build up on the exterior of the aircraft in sub-freezing temperatures at altitude, only to fall to earth as blue ice after the airplane descends to land. London Heathrow Airport has had a recurring problem of wheel-well stowaway bodies dropping in residential areas around the airport when airplanes extend their landing gear as they prepare to land.

== See also ==
- Index of aviation articles
