= Calgary Urban Species Response Team =

Canadian volunteer organization

- Nickname: CUSRT
- Formation: September 2019
- Purpose: Urban wildlife research and advocacy
- Headquarters: Calgary, Alberta
- Website: https://www.calgaryurbanspecies.ca/
- Formerly called: Calgary Migratory Species Response Team

The Calgary Urban Species Response Team (CUSRT) is a citizen science project and volunteer organization founded in Calgary, Alberta that seeks to research the risks faced by urban wildlife, and educate the public on ways that people can mitigate them.

== History ==
The group was co-founded in the fall of 2019 by Kathleen Johnson, Scott Lovell, and Melanie Whalen, as the Calgary Migratory Species Response Team. The original goal of the group was to research the impact of buildings in downtown Calgary on migrating bird and bat populations. This eventually expanded to include advocacy efforts for other urban wildlife, and due to this expansion in focus the group was renamed to the Calgary Urban Species Response Team.

In 2019, the organization had around 40 volunteers. During September and October 2019 the group reported that they had identified 107 animal strikes, with 88 being fatalities. On November 23, 2019 they hosted a public event at St. Mary's University to share their findings, and teach about the impact that the urban environment has on bat and bird migration.

In 2023, the group reported that they had found more than 600 bats and birds downtown since the fall migration season of 2019. It was also reported that they had about 20 volunteers at this time.

As of 2024, the organization has identified about 50 species of bird and bat that are at risk for building collisions.

The group attended the Inglewood Bird Sanctuary's World Migratory Bird Day event in May, 2025. Their booth, which was with Bird-Friendly Calgary, focused on how residents could reduce the risk of bird and bat window strikes in their own homes.

== Programs ==
=== Downtown surveys ===
Volunteers with the organization have been performing surveys in downtown Calgary during the spring and fall migration season since September 2019, looking for evidence of bat and bird window collisions, rescuing live collision victims, collecting dead collision specimens, and identifying high-impact collision areas. Window strike fatalities are taken in for data collection before being donated to the Royal Alberta Museum.

=== Window strike record ===
The group runs a form where members of the public can submit bat and bird window strikes that they find. Information collected is added to the Global Bird Collision Mapper, which is run by FLAP Canada.

=== Outreach and education ===
The group attends outreach events to share their findings, and inform the public about steps they can take to help urban wildlife. The group has also worked with Calgary photographer and artist, Julya Hajnoczky who has created a picture archive of the specimens that CUSRT had collected. She has also created an art piece from these photographs, entitled "It Must Look Beautiful From Up There" which depicts a bird window-strike victim underneath a glowing city grid.

=== Wildlife Wednesdays ===
Wildlife Wednesdays is an informational video series aimed at supporting urban wildlife and habitat, and making wildlife observing more accessible.

== Partnerships ==
The group works with organizations like Bird-Friendly Calgary, Nature Canada, Calgary Wildlife Rehabilitation Society, and Grow Wild YYC.

== See also ==
- Bird Friendly Calgary
