= Aeroballistic Range Association =

Nonprofit organization

Aeroballistc Range Association
- Abbreviation: ARA
- Formation: 1961
- Type: Nonprofit membership organization
- Region served: Worldwide
- Members: 51 Organizations
- Official language: English
- Website: www.aeroballistics.org

The Aeroballistic Range Association (ARA) is a nonprofit organization for facilities engaged in research in ballistics and material testing, in addition to the development of related launchers such as single-stage, 2-stage, and 3-stage.

== Purpose ==
The organization was formed to share information about facility design, instrumentation development and range operations. The organization holds a yearly meeting, usually at a location near an active test facility. Members are encouraged to present at least one technical paper per meeting.

== Student outreach ==
The ARA started a outreach program that intends to promote ballistic research in the early stages of career development. They established a student research paper contest that provided cash stipends at around $1,000 for winners, as well as invitations to ARA meetings to present their papers.

== See also ==
- Ballistics
- AEDC Range G
- AEDC Ballistic Range S-3
- Ames Research Center
