= AEDC Range G =

AEDC Range-G
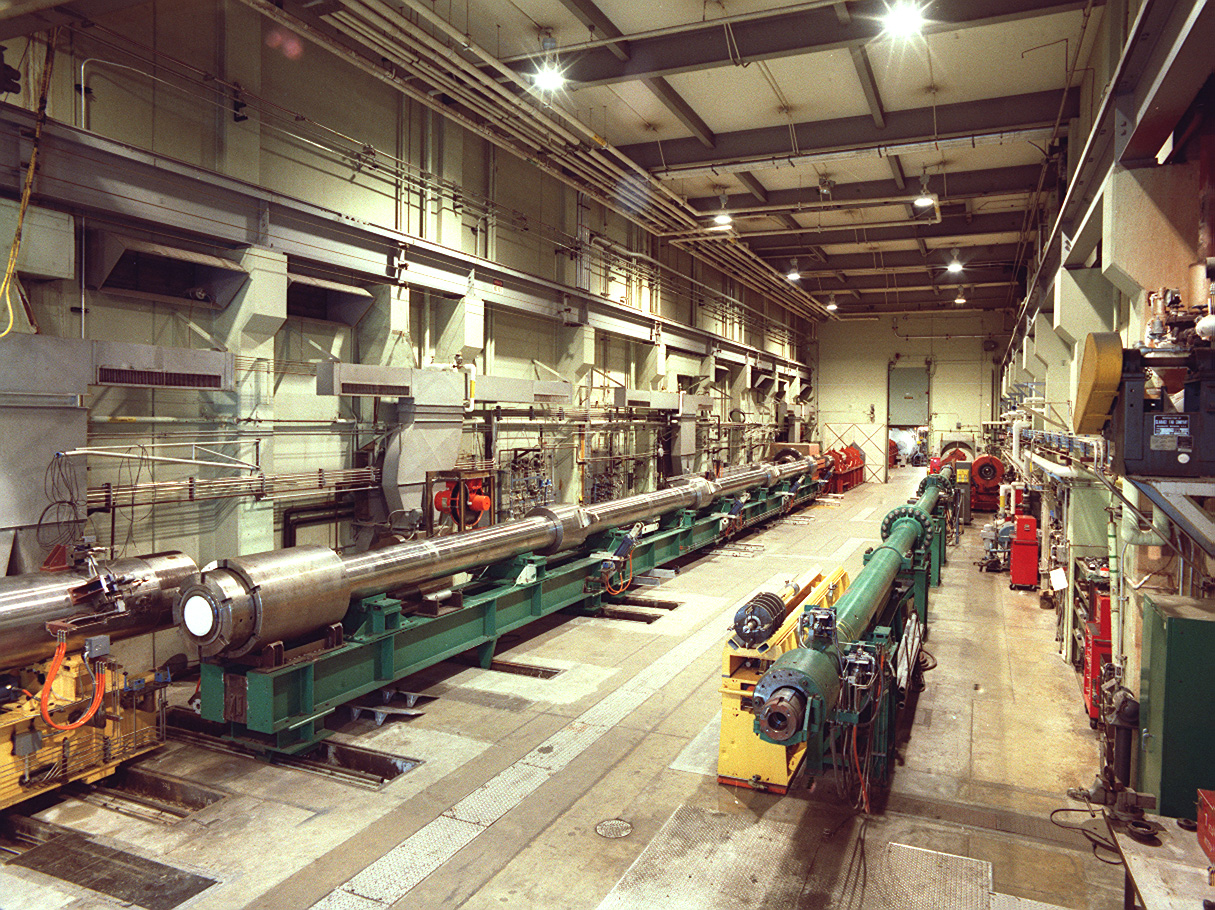
- G Range shown on the Left
- Active: 1962–Present
- Country: United States
- Branch: US Air Force
- Role: Test Facility
- Nickname(s): G-Range

AEDC Range G is a two-stage light-gas gun owned by the United States Air Force.

== History ==
Constructed in 1962, the AEDC Range-G is the largest routinely operated light-gas gun in the United States. It is located at Arnold Engineering Development Complex on Arnold Air Force Base. The design of the range came from collaboration between German and American scientists after World War II. Range-G has played a crucial role in lethality development for many defense programs. The range has performed more than 7,000 high speed launches.

== Capabilities ==
Range G is capable of launching projectiles up to speeds of 7 km/s (22,965 ft/s). The gun has an interchangeable barrel that can accommodate projectile diameters of 3.3 inches, 4.0 inches, and 8.0 inches. The projectile is launched into a 10 ft diameter test chamber that is approximately 1000 ft long. This chamber can be conditioned to pressures from 0.2 torr (26.7 pascals) to 1.7 atmospheres (172 kilopascals). Sections of the tank can also be configured to simulate possible flight conditions such as rain or snow.

Currently the facility offers a wide variety of instruments for hyperballistic testing. Instruments are available for making measurements related to the flight of the projectile and the target impact event. Instrumentation includes shadowgraph cameras, high speed video cameras, and multiple plane digital x-ray sensors. The range personnel have in-depth experience with the design and analysis of projectiles under gun conditions. AEDC also operates a fully staffed machine shop capable of fabricating complex projectiles for any of the available barrel sizes.

== See also ==
- Ballistics
- NASA Chicken Gun
- AEDC Ballistic Range S-3
- Ames Research Center
