= Chicken Cannon =

Chicken Cannon may refer to:

- Chicken gun, used to simulate high-speed bird strikes during aircraft flight
- a device featured on the satirical Canadian TV show Royal Canadian Air Farce
