= Bird Friendly Calgary =

- Formation: 2020-11
- Website: https://www.birdfriendlycalgary.ca/

Bird Friendly Calgary is volunteer organization located in Calgary, Alberta focused on the protection of birds and other urban biodiversity.

== History ==
The Calgary Bird Team was established in November, 2020 by members of local environmental groups, the City of Calgary, and interested citizens.

Calgary was first certified as a bird friendly city in 2021 by Nature Canada's Bird Friendly City initiative.

In April 2022 Bird Friendly Calgary partnered with Nature Canada and the City of Calgary to hold a vote to choose an official city bird. The winner was announced in May on World Migratory Bird Day and officially recognized in June, which was the black-capped chickadee. The vote was held to promote Calgary's certification as a bird safe city the previous year.

In 2025 the organization began its Lights Out for Birds campaign which encourages city residents to turn off their lights from 11pm-6am during spring and fall bird migration.

In November 2025 Calgary became the first city to be certified as "bird friendly" three times.

== Programs ==
=== City Bird Vote ===
In April 2022 Bird Friendly Calgary partnered with Nature Canada and the City of Calgary to hold a vote to choose an official city bird. The winner was announced in May and officially recognized in June, which was the black-capped chickadee.

=== Lights Out for Birds Campaign ===
The group has worked to educate high-rise dwellers and downtown workers about light pollution's impact on birds and bird-building collisions. They also started a campaign to encourage city residents to turn off their lights from 11pm-6am during migratory periods.

== Partners ==
Organizations that Bird Friendly Calgary has partnered with include Nature Canada, Nature Calgary, Calgary Urban Species Response Team, Royal Astronomical Society of Canada - Calgary Centre, and the City of Calgary.
