= FLAP Canada =

Canadian environmental organization

Fatal Light Awareness Program (FLAP) Canada
- Formation: 1993
- Headquarters: Toronto, Canada
- Website: https://flap.org/

The Fatal Light Awareness Program Canada, also known as FLAP Canada, is a registered Canadian non-profit focused on the protection of migratory birds and bringing awareness to the issue of bird building collisions. The organization is involved in data collection, outreach and education, policy development, as well as rescue and rehabilitation.

== History ==
The organization was founded in 1993 by a group of people, including Michael Mesure and Paloma Plant.

The organization began its Lights Out initiative in 1995, in partnership with World Wildlife Fund Canada, to limit light pollution and aid migrating birds, which has led to other such initiatives across North America.

FLAP Canada has advocated for bird-friendly development guides in cities, including pushing for the creation of the Bird-Friendly Development Guidelines in Toronto which were adopted by the city in 2007.

In 2018 the organization launched the Global Bird Rescue.

In 2025 the organization advocated against Ontario's Bill 17, also known as the Protect Ontario by Building Faster and Smarter Act, due to the bill's dismantling of bird-friendly design requirements for developers.

== Programs ==
=== Global Bird Collision Mapper ===
The Global Bird Collision Mapper is an online international mapping tool and database that allows registered and guest users to report bird building collisions. The tool uses software from Esri Canada. The tool also allows users to view submitted data on an interactive GIS map.

=== Bird Collision Monitoring Patrols ===
FLAP Canada organizes surveys in the Greater Toronto Area during the spring and fall migration period. Volunteers look for birds that have collided with buildings and rescue the live birds and collect the dead birds. Dead birds are often donated to the Royal Ontario Museum for study and display purposes. Over their years of operation they have found over 85 000 birds from 172 species.

=== Birds in Your Hood ===
Birds in Your Hood is an educational outreach program launched in 2018 by FLAP Canada to encourage youth to appreciate bird biodiversity in their neighbourhoods. The program also involved students designing their own conservation-based project, and FLAP lead presentations. The program was relaunched in spring 2025 for the Greater Toronto Area.

=== Bird-Safe Campus ===
This program encourages personnel at university or college campuses to advocate for bird-safe practices on their own campus. It includes resources on starting campus bird-strike monitoring programs, student outreach guides, classroom and experiential learning suggestions, and an e-newsletter.

== Campaigns ==
=== Annual Bird Layout ===
The annual layout is a display created using the bodies of the dead birds that FLAP volunteers collected during the year on their monitoring patrols. The first one was created in 2001, and its purpose is to raise awareness to the dangers birds face in urban environments.

=== Global Bird Rescue ===
FLAP Canada developed and launched the Global Bird Rescue in 2018. It is an annual 7-day community science event usually held in late September/early October to rescue and collect data on birds who collide with buildings. Data is collected using the Global Bird Collision Mapper. The event is held in partnership with Nature Canada, and is sponsored by Feather Friendly and Niagara Action for Animals.
