= Carla Dove =

Ornithologist and American researcher of bird-aircraft strikes

Carla J. Dove
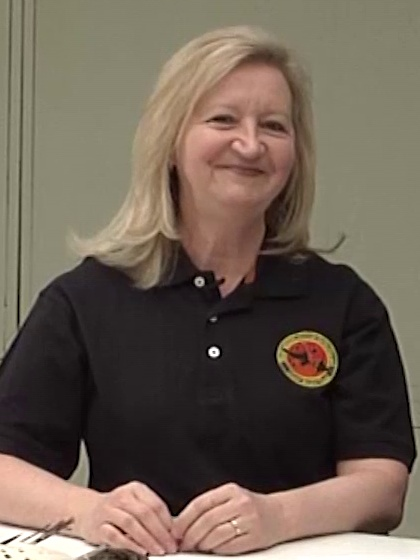
- Dove in 2018
- Born: October 17, 1962 (age 62); Harrisonburg, Virginia, United States
- Education: Lord Fairfax Community College (AS, 1983); University of Montana (BS, 1986); George Mason University (MS, 1994), (PhD, 1998)
- Occupation: Program Manager for Feather Identification Lab in the Division of Birds at the National Museum of Natural History

Carla J. Dove (born October 17, 1962) is an American researcher who specializes in identifying birds that have gotten trapped in airplane engines, known as bird strikes. She is currently the Program Manager for Feather Identification Lab in the Division of Birds at the National Museum of Natural History. Her work helps promote wildlife safety, as well as pave the way for the development of preventative measures that will decrease the chance of wildlife impacting airplanes. She has published over 40 articles on her research so far.

== Early life ==
Dove was born on October 17, 1962, in Harrisonburg, Virginia, United States. From an early age, she was involved in outdoor activities, in part because she grew up near George Washington National Forest. Her early hobbies lead her to become interested in wildlife, and later helped fuel her passion for birds.

== Education and early career ==
Dove graduated from Broadway High School in 1981. She was a first-generation college student, who went on to pursue multiple degrees within her field. In 1983, she earned an associate degree from the National Resources Program at Lord Fairfax Community College. Dove transferred to the University of Montana where she found her passion for birds. She earned a work-study grant in the zoological museum as a curatorial assistant where she learned to work in research collections and skin birds. In 1986, she earned a BS degree in wildlife biology. After earning her degree, she worked in a cancer research lab for a few years in Maryland before finding a job at the Natural History Museum.

Dove accepted a temporary position in the Division of Birds at the National Museum of Natural History as a museum technician in 1989. There she became an apprentice to Roxie Laybourne, assisting with her work on the identification of bird species from the microscopic characteristics of downy feathers. In addition to her position as a technician and her work with Roxie Laybourne, Dove enrolled in George Mason University in 1989 to pursue a master's program. In 1994 she earned her MS degree in biology. Her thesis was on the microscopic structure of feathers in North American plovers. Later that year, the U.S. Air Force accepted a research and training proposal that allowed Dove to focus on her research with a salaried position.

Dove later re-enrolled at George Mason University to continue her education, completing her PhD in environmental science and public policy for her dissertation on the microscopic characters of Charadriiformes (a type of shorebird) in 1998.

== Research and publications ==
Dove began working with birds during her temporary position at the National Museum of Natural History in the Division of Birds. From there she transitioned to her current position as program manager for the Feather Identification Lab. Using forensic methodologies, she is able to identify bird species from leftover fragments in the field of ornithology. These fragments range from the macroscopic level (feathers, beaks, color, size, pattern, feet) to microscopic fragments (blood, tissue samples). The lab is funded through agreements between the Federal Aviation Administration, U.S. Air Force, U.S. Navy, and the Smithsonian Institution.

Reporting and identifying wildlife strikes is of critical importance to promoting the safety of wildlife and the prevention of impacts with aeroplanes. This research has led to the creation of an Air Force database which forecasts bird movements as well as creating bird hazard warnings which are given to pilots. Engineers are able to design windshields and engines that are safer. Additionally, the data is used to manage habitats on airfields. This information is used in military and civil aviation to promote a safer environment for human and wildlife alike.

In addition to identifying the remains of birds that have impacted with aeroplanes, her skills have been used in a variety of other cases as well. Around 2013, her help was requested to identify what bird species were being eaten by giant Burmese pythons living in the Florida Everglades.

Her knowledge has led her to become an expert in her field internationally, and thus often collaborates with many scientists and organizations over the course of her career. She often works with researchers of ecology, anthropology and evolutionary biology. She has been a consultant to the US Air Force, US Navy, FBI, US Fish and Wildlife Service Law Enforcement Division, US Fish and Wildlife Service, the National Transportation Safety Board, FAA, in addition to various airplane engine manufacturers.

== Awards and honors ==
- Received the Medallion of Recognition Recipients, 2000
- Affiliate Professor at George Mason University, 2000-2002
- Served as Treasurer for the Senate of Scientists of the Smithsonian Institution, Natural History Museum, 2004
- Elected member of Washington Biologists Field Club, 2007
- Member of American Ornithology Society
- Member of Wilson Ornithological Society
- Member of Cooper Ornithological Society
- Inducted into the Virginia Community College System's Hall of Fame
- Panel member of National Science Foundation
- Served on the Smithsonian Ornithology Steering Committee
