= Richard Dolbeer =

American biologist

- Born: August 18, 1945 (age 81); Jackson, Tennessee
- Education: PhD
- Alma mater: University of the South; University of Tennessee; Colorado State University
- Occupations: biologist ornithologist
- Awards: Caesar Kleberg Award for Excellence in Applied Wildlife Research from The Wildlife Society; Jack H. Berryman Institute Research Award

Richard Dolbeer is an American biologist. Dolbeer served at the U.S. Department of Agriculture as an expert on human-wildlife conflicts, especially wildlife and aircraft. He is now a consultant in this area.

== Early life and education ==
Richard Dolbeer was born on August 18, 1945, in Jackson, Tennessee. In 1967 he received his undergraduate degree in Biology from the University of the South and then received his master's degree in Zoology from the University of Tennessee in 1969. He earned his PhD in Wildlife Biology from Colorado State University.

== Research and administrative career ==
Richard Dolbeer is a biologist and ornithologist, who has researched population dynamics of pest species, economic assessment of losses, development of practical management techniques for resolving human–wildlife conflicts, and integrated pest management programs. He is also an expert commentator in the media on the dangers of birds in aviation. Following his early ornithological research, according to Wired magazine, "After listening to the airport executives’ bird-related angst, Dolbeer decided the time had come for him to shift professional gears: He would henceforth devote himself to preventing midair collisions between birds and planes."

From 1972 to 2008 Dolbeer worked at the U.S. Department of Agriculture's Wildlife Research Center in Sandusky, Ohio. He co-authored the very first course of action for wildlife management at airports with Edward Cleary, entitled Wildlife Hazard Management at Airports: A Manual for Airport Personnel, which is used at airports through North America, Europe, Africa, and South America. He also helped to found the Aviation-Wildlife Research Project of the Department of Agriculture during the 1980s and led it until 2002. Between 1997 and 2008 he chaired the Bird Strike Committee-USA, a committee coordinating industry and government efforts to reduce collisions between aircraft and birds. While at the Department, he was also the National Coordinator for the Airport Wildlife Hazards Program from 2002 to 2008. In all his committees, Dolbeer worked with both domestic and foreign government officials to create international techniques for the prevention of bird strikes and the promotion of safety for birds and aircraft.

Over his time at the Department of Agriculture, he authored about 170 scientific papers and was an associate editor for the Journal of Wildlife Management. As of 2025, he had over 230 scientific publications. He is also an elected member of the American Ornithological Society. In terms of recognition, he is a two-time winner of the Jack H. Berryman Institute Research Award, three-time awardee of the USDA Honor Award, and was given both the Lifetime Achievement Award from Bird Strike Committee U.S.A. and the FAA Excellence in Aviation Research award. He was then the inaugural winner of the Caesar Kleberg Award for Excellence in Applied Wildlife Research from The Wildlife Society in 2008.

== Consultancy ==
Following his position with the Department of Agriculture, Dolbeer became a consultant in the area, including serving as an advisor to the FAA alongside the USDA. In 2015 he composed the report Trends in Reporting of Wildlife Strikes for the FAA, which analyzed how many collisions between aircraft and birds in the US. In the report he stated that mandatory reporting of collisions would not be necessary due to the number of voluntary reports issues per year, stating that 42% of bird strikes per year were likely reported. Dolbeer currently serves as a consultant for the FAA national wildlife strike database, a database he helped establish in the 1990s.

Through his work, Dolbeer led research projects that developed several methods of deterring birds from being in the landing and take-off paths of airplanes airports and dispersing those that approach the area. This has included laser-driven bird dispersal, and working with the EPA and FDA to approve foraging repellents and wildlife capture drugs. Dolbeer's techniques led to a “dramatic reduction” in collisions between birds and aircraft at the John F. Kennedy International Airport as well as several others. He also co-authored reports on the increase of bird strikes in US airspace, which he attributed to several factors, including the advent of quieter aircraft, as well as increases in populations of large-bird species near airports.

== Personal life ==
Dolbeer was an elected official with the Board of Education in Huron, Ohio from 1981–1989. In addition to his consultancy work, he also manages a 60-acre wildlife sanctuary, Bluebird Haven, near his home. He was married to his wife Saundra for fifty years, until her death in 2017.
