= Esri Canada =

- Type: Private
- Industry: Software; Geographic Information Systems (GIS); Information management Spatial analytics Mapping
- Founded: Toronto, (1984)
- Headquarters: Toronto, Ontario, Canada43°43′48.6804″N 79°19′42.74″W
- Key people: Alex Miller, Founder/President
- Products: ArcGIS
- Number of employees: 600 (2025)
- Website: esri.ca

Esri Canada is the Canadian provider of enterprise geographic information system (GIS) software from Esri. GIS allows multiple layers of information to be displayed on a single map.

The company is a Platinum Winner among Canada's Best Managed Companies.

== History and expansion ==
Esri Canada was founded in Toronto in 1984 by Alex Miller and his wife Mary-Charlotte Miller. Among the early users of Esri technology in Canada are forestry company J.D. Irving, Ltd. and Oxford County, Ontario.

The County of Oxford’s pioneering GIS model in 1985, called the Land Related Information System (LRIS), integrated information such as property and infrastructure data from various government systems. The LRIS received the Exemplary Systems in Government Award from the Urban and Regional Information Systems Association (URISA) in 1988. The system has been expanded to support numerous business processes including administering building permits, civic addressing and emergency preparedness planning.

In 2023, Esri Canada acquired Ratio.City, a Toronto-based urban planning software and data company, to expand its community planning solutions portfolio. In 2025, the company announced its expansion into the Intelligent Transportation System (ITS) sector, with the aim to improve safety, urban mobility, and transportation infrastructure across Canada using GIS technology.

== GIS applications across industries ==
The City of Ottawa in Ontario has used GIS technology to develop a digital twin of the city, giving planners a tool to see the city’s past, present and future with the click of a mouse. Ottawa’s digital twin harnesses high-resolution aerial photography, bylaws and technical specifications, geological studies and other data sets to form a 3D virtual duplicate of the city.

The City of Brandon, Manitoba replaced its asset management system with a GIS to see, manage and share vital information about its water network on a dynamic map in real time.

The City of Abbotsford, British Columbia developed the Community Homelessness Information Application (CHIA), a mobile GIS app that allows front-line outreach workers to track service delivery in encampments, access real-time bed inventory updates at shelters, and develop historical data to advocate for more resources.

Rona (company), a Canadian home renovation products retailer, uses GIS technology to plan flyer distribution. They incorporate data from loyalty programs with other socio-economic data to obtain a picture of customer spending around each store. The same data helps the retailer in locating new stores.

Utilities Kingston, which provides water, wastewater, gas, electrical and networking services in Kingston, Ontario, eliminated paper trail in its operations, such as surveys and field visits for repairs and maintenance, by using mobile GIS applications.

St. Michael’s Hospital (Toronto) uses GIS modelling for its [BIO.DIASPORA] project, which predicts the global spread of infectious diseases by analyzing commercial air travel. The system was used to accurately predict the spread of the H1N1 virus around the world in early 2009, and also analyzed potential health threats during the 2010 Vancouver Olympics. BIO.DIASPORA was named a Laureate winner in the 2011 Computerworld Honors program, which recognizes outstanding use of information technology to benefit society.

== Community programs ==
Esri Canada’s K-12 Education Program was initiated in 1987 to raise awareness of GIS as a problem-solving tool for students and teachers. Through this initiative, teachers nationwide gain access to a real-world tool that provides students with skills, such as geographic literacy, spatial awareness, critical thinking and analytical reasoning. The program has received the Alex Trebek Medal for Geographic Literacy from the Royal Canadian Geographical Society.

Through its Higher Education and Research Program, Esri Canada conducted a research study in 2022 with the Infrastructure Institute at the University of Toronto’s School of Cities to analyze how much housing supply can be generated by redeveloping underused facilities and surface parking in Toronto’s six largest retail chains.

The Community Maps Program was initiated by Esri Canada in 2009, allowing organizations to share and host geographic data. The program is accessible to public and private organizations and web users. It connects all participants in one national GIS, allowing for collaboration between communities and the ability to look at information at a larger scale. Peterborough, Ontario cited it used the program to update the city’s traffic sign inventories, shortening update time from two to three summers to a summer.

Esri Canada curates maps, apps and datasets specifically for Canada in the Living Atlas of the World, a collection of authoritative, ready-to-use geographic information available through ArcGIS Online. Canadian content includes national datasets, wildfire and weather datasets, and Indigenous datasets such as Indigenous Geographical Names, Tribal Council Locations and Treaty Agreements.

== Philanthropy ==
Esri Canada has been involved with the Trans Canada Trail since the 1990s. The company has donated software, services, support and money for the trail. An interactive map of the trail was created by Esri Canada for the public and for those who maintain the trail. The map shows the trail’s path over land and water as well as photos and community tips from trail users so the public can enjoy this unique national resource.

Fatal Light Awareness Program (FLAP) Canada created the Global Bird Collision Mapper, a web app for reporting and viewing the locations of bird collisions with buildings across the globe, with software and support from Esri Canada. The app allows a registered user to report the species, location, time and status of the bird they recover. This citizen science tool shows every collision reported on its interactive GIS map, providing data to further understand the issue of bird-window collisions and push for bird-safe retrofits on dangerous buildings.

Esri Canada created the web app MCSC Rescu for the Missing Children Society of Canada. The app can be continually updated with new information on missing children investigations. It enlists the public to help find missing children by allowing users to register to receive text alerts on their cellphones, specific to cases in their area. The Calgary Police Service and Tsuut'ina Nation Police Service were first to adopt the web app.
