= Bird strike =

Collision between a vehicle and a bird

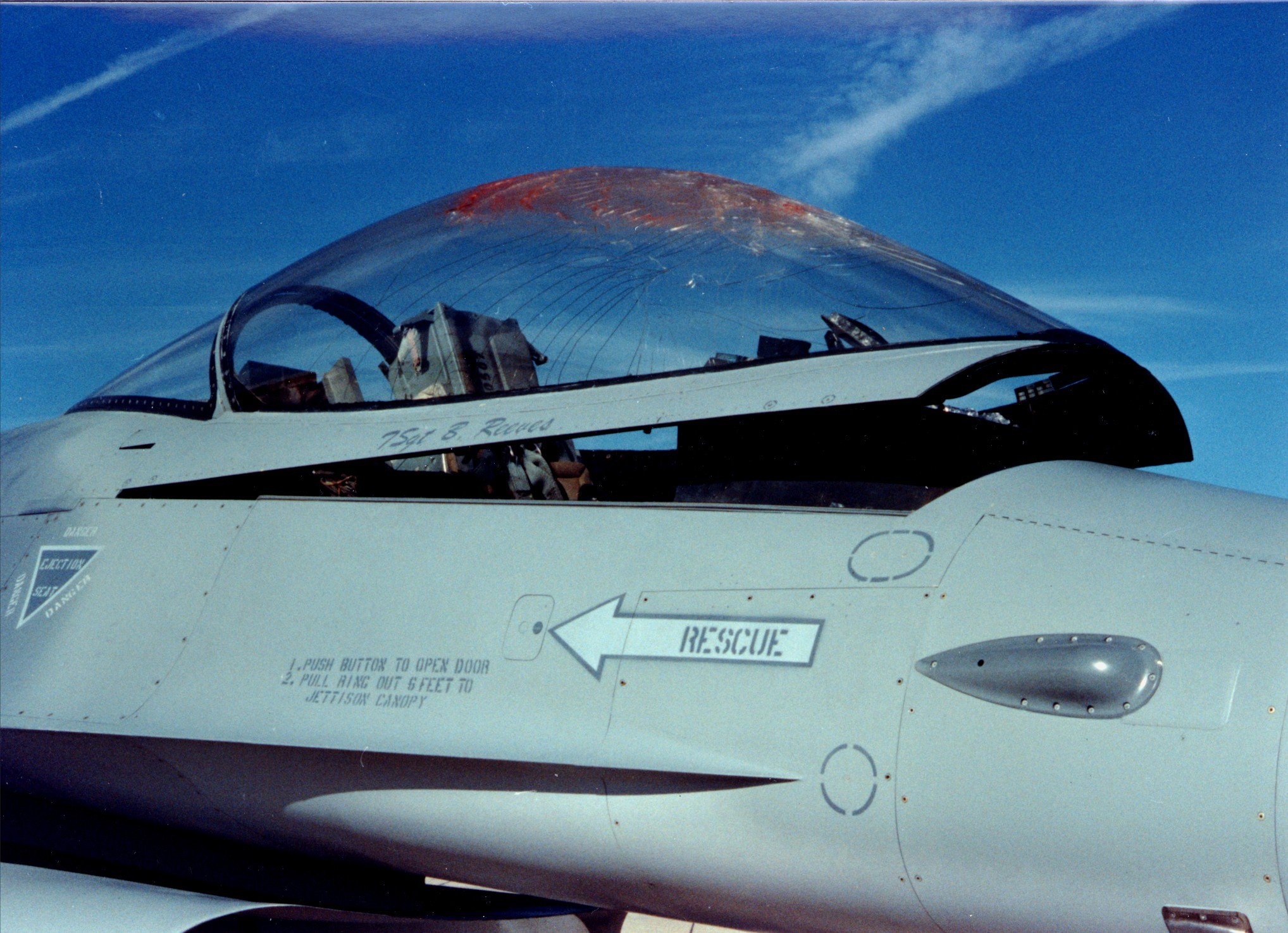
F-16 jet fighter after bird strike

A bird strike (sometimes called birdstrike, bird ingestion (for an engine), bird hit, or bird aircraft strike hazard (BASH)) is a collision between a flying animal (usually a bird, occasionally bat) and a moving vehicle (typically an aircraft, occasionally high-speed train or automobile). The term is also used for bird deaths resulting from collisions with high-rise buildings, towers (see bird–skyscraper collisions and towerkill) and tall structures such as overhead power lines and wind turbines.

A significant threat to aviation safety, bird strikes have caused a number of accidents with human casualties. Nevertheless, the number of major accidents involving civil aircraft is quite low, and the majority of bird strikes cause little damage to the aircraft despite usually being fatal to the bird(s) involved. Efforts have been made to mitigate both the risk and severity of bird strike incidents.

== Factors affecting probability ==
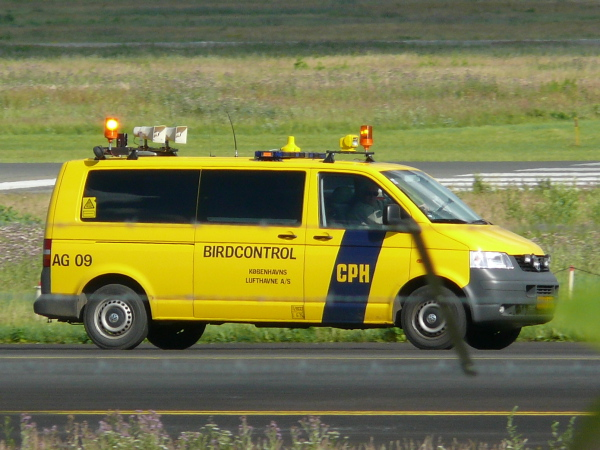
A bird control vehicle belonging to Copenhagen Airport Kastrup, equipped with various tools

Bird strikes are more likely to occur at low altitudes. Strikes have been reported to occur most during the takeoff, climb, approach, and landing phases of flight. Many aircraft fly above the altitudes than birds typically fly, reducing risk of strike at higher altitudes. However, bird strikes have still been reported at high altitudes, some as high as 6,000 to 9,000 m (20,000 to 30,000 ft) above the ground. For instance, an aircraft over the Ivory Coast collided with a Rüppell's vulture at the altitude of 11,300 m (37,100 ft), the current record avian height.

Higher bird activity during certain seasons leads to more bird strikes. During winter, fewer bird strikes are recorded, whereas young birds fledging from nests in the summer and bird migration in spring and autumn leads to higher bird strike rates. The largest numbers of strikes happen during the spring and fall migrations. Bird strikes above 500 feet (150 m) altitude are about 7 times more common at night than during the day during the bird migration season.

Location affects bird strike probability since different bird species with distinct builds and behaviors reside in different locations. At airports, the presence of food, water and shelter increase bird strike probability. In general, a higher local density of birds near an airport will result in an increased strike rate.

The characteristics of an aircraft also affect the probability of a bird strike occurring. Turbofan engines, which the majority of commercial aircraft use, are more likely to ingest birds during a bird strike due to their large size and suction effect. An aircraft that is quieter is also more difficult for birds detect quickly enough to divert their flight path and successfully avoid collision.

== Factors affecting severity ==
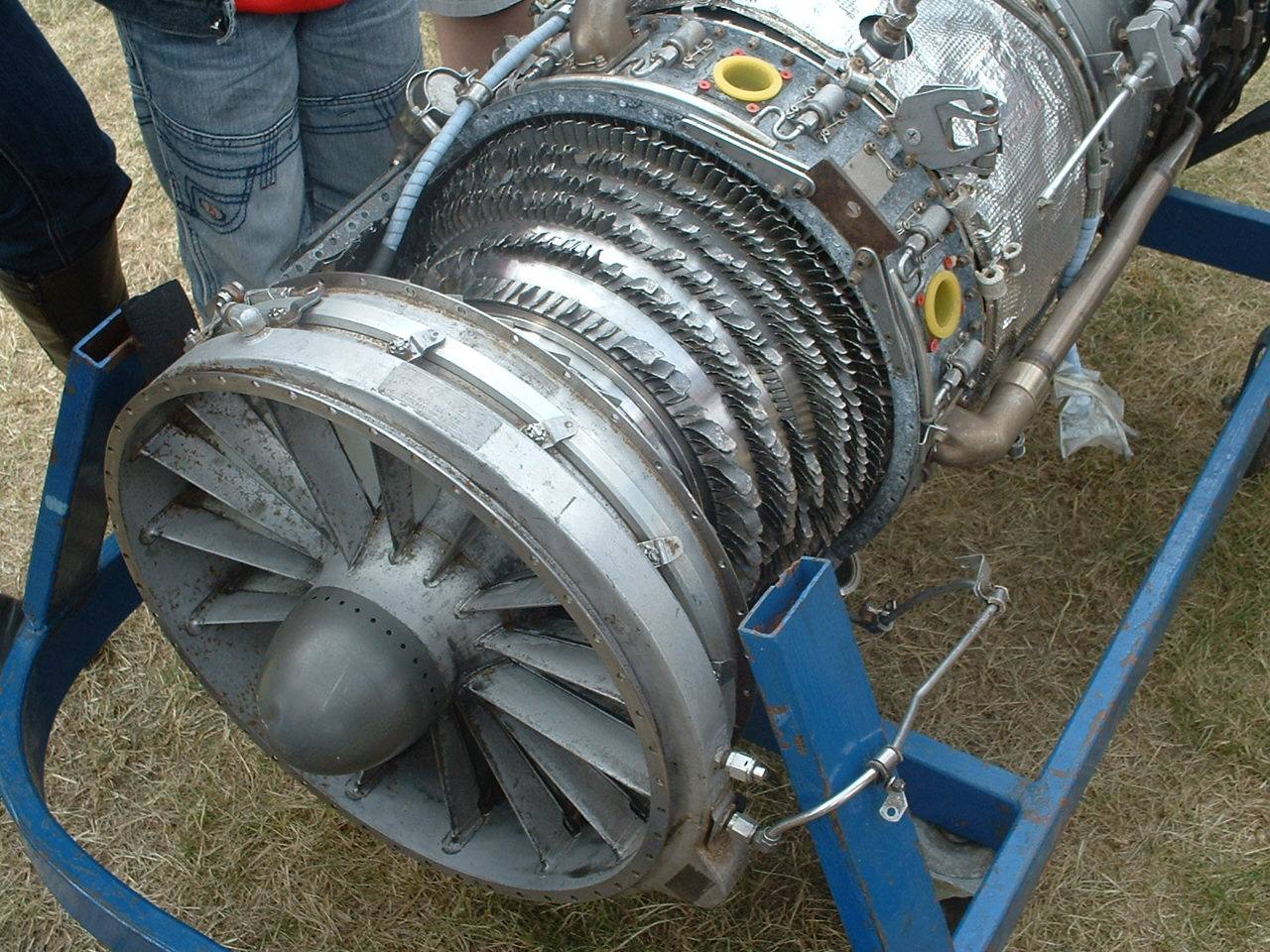
Inside of a jet engine after a bird strike

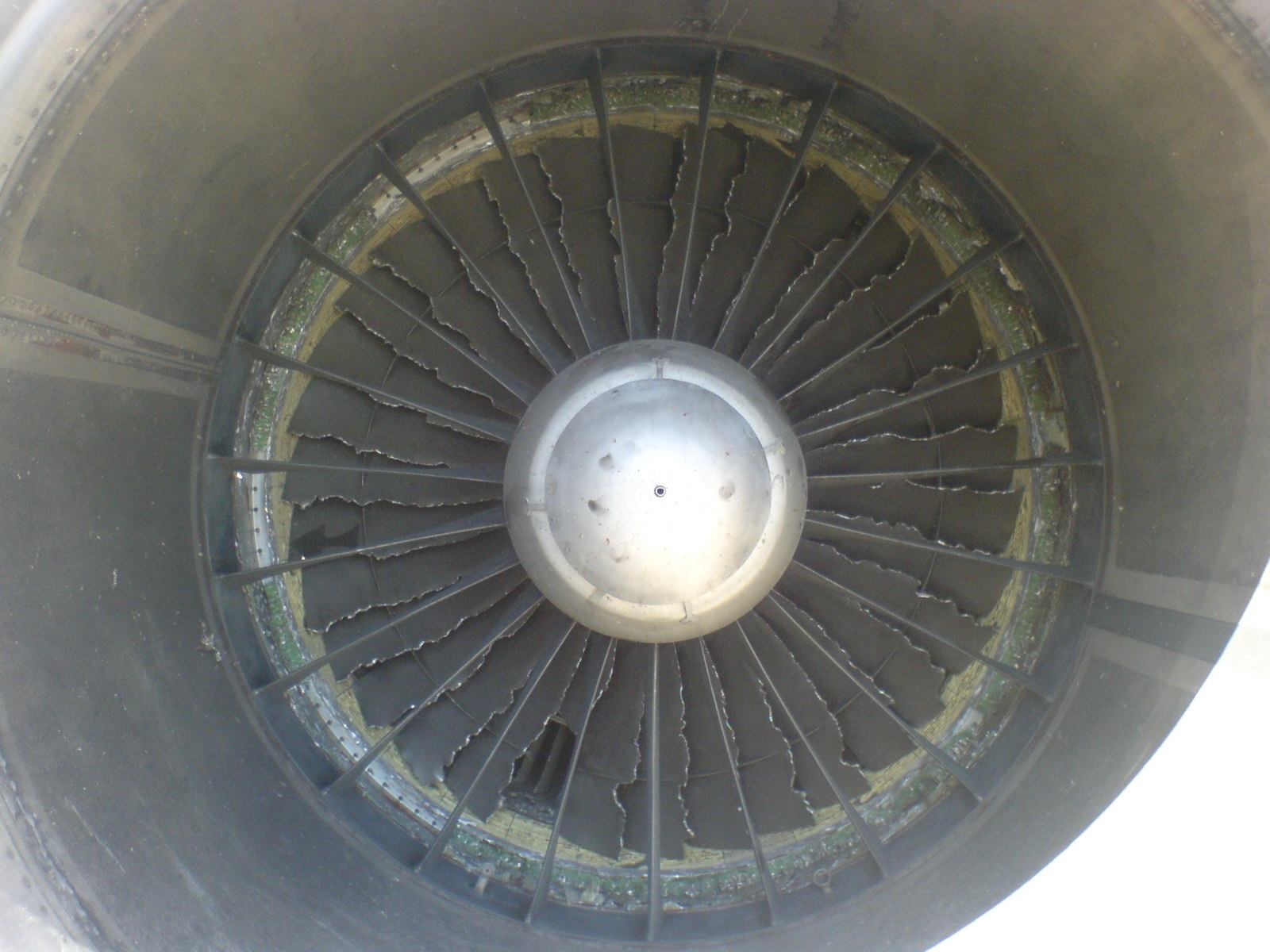
View of fan blades of a Pratt & Whitney JT8D jet engine after a bird strike

The majority of bird strikes do not cause actual damage to the aircraft. According to the FAA, only 15% of strikes (ICAO 11%) actually result in damage to the aircraft. For the strikes that do cause aircraft damage, the severity of the damage depends on the aircraft's velocity, the part of the aircraft that is struck, and the number and size of the bird(s) involved in the strike.

The aircraft's velocity and the total mass of the bird(s) involved in the strike contribute to the kinetic energy of the collision, which affects the severity of the strike. A higher aircraft velocity and larger total mass of the bird(s) involved in the strike leads to a higher collision kinetic energy, which increases the likelihood that the bird strike will result in aircraft damage. Because of this, it is more likely for bird strikes to cause damage at higher altitudes where the aircraft's velocity is higher and where larger birds fly.

The majority of bird strikes hit the front of the aircraft. The severity of the bird strike is typically much higher when the strike hits the engine(s), as this can lead to ingestion of the bird(s) into the engine and subsequent loss of engine power. Additionally, aircraft with two engines instead of three or four engines, which include the majority of the world's aircraft, are more susceptible to severe danger from ingestion since there is less redundancy.

== Reporting and statistics ==
The International Civil Aviation Organization (ICAO) Bird Strike Information System (IBIS) collects data on wildlife strikes globally, with 214,734 reports from 156 states being included in the 2022 to 2024 analysis. However, globally, about 50% of all bird strikes still go unreported. Reporting for bird strikes is mandatory in some countries, such as in Australia and within the European Union, and is primarily voluntary in other countries, such as in the United States. Though it is a conservative estimate to account for incomplete reporting, bird strikes are estimated to cost at least $1 billion in damage annually to commercial aircraft worldwide.

=== United States airport statistics ===
Aggregated records from the FAA National Wildlife Strike Database for civil aircraft in the United States show that some airports account for a disproportionate share of strikes that result in aircraft damage. In an open multi-decade aggregate of those reports, Sacramento International Airport ((IATA: SMF, ICAO: KSMF)) ranked first among US airports by count of damaging wildlife strikes (491 reported damaging strikes in the published freeze), with Salt Lake City International Airport ((IATA: SLC, ICAO: KSLC)) among the next highest (378). Rankings depend on reporting practices and traffic volume; the FAA has long noted that wildlife-strike reporting in the United States is largely voluntary for civil operators. The species struck most often are not the ones most likely to cause damage: in the same aggregate, perching songbirds account for about 41% of identified strikes but damage aircraft in about 1.5% of reports, whereas deer account for under 1% of strikes yet damage aircraft in about 82% of reported cases. These are rates per reported strike rather than per flight hour, so each is conditional on a report having been filed.

== Species ==
Following a strike, remains of the bird, termed snarge, are sent to identification centers where forensic techniques may be used to identify the species involved. These samples need to be taken carefully by trained personnel to ensure proper analysis and reduce the risks of infection (zoonoses).

Most bird strikes involve large birds with big populations, particularly geese and gulls in the United States. In parts of the US, Canada geese and migratory snow geese populations have risen significantly while Canada geese and greylag geese have increased in parts of Europe, increasing the risk of these large birds to aircraft. In other parts of the world, large birds of prey such as Gyps vultures and Milvus kites are often involved. In the US, reported strikes are mainly from waterfowl (30%), gulls (22%), raptors (20%), and pigeons and doves (7%). The Smithsonian Institution's Feather Identification Laboratory has identified turkey vultures as the most damaging birds, followed by Canada geese and white pelicans, all of which are very large birds. In terms of frequency, the laboratory most commonly finds mourning doves and horned larks involved in the strike.

Vultures and geese have been ranked the second and third most hazardous kinds of wildlife to aircraft in the United States, after deer (which encroach runways and collide with aircraft taking off and landing), with approximately 240 goose–aircraft collisions in the United States each year. Vehicular collisions were one of the primary contributors to the near–extinction of the California Condor and remains a threat to the species following its reintroduction into the wild.

An animal hazard reported from London Stansted Airport in England is rabbits: they get run over by ground vehicles and planes, and they pass large amounts of droppings, which attract mice, which in turn attract owls, which then become another birdstrike hazard.

== Countermeasures ==
There are three approaches to reduce the effect of bird strikes. The vehicles can be designed to be more bird-resistant, the birds can be moved out of the way of the vehicle, or the vehicle can be moved out of the way of the birds.

=== Vehicle design ===
Most large commercial jet engines include design features that ensure they can shut down after ingesting a bird weighing up to 1.8 kg (4.0 lb). The engine does not have to survive the ingestion, just be safely shut down. This is a standalone requirement, meaning the engine alone, not the aircraft, must pass the test. Multiple strikes (such as from hitting a flock of birds) on twin-engine jet aircraft are very serious events because they can disable multiple aircraft systems. Emergency action may be required to land the aircraft, as in the January 15, 2009 forced ditching of US Airways Flight 1549.

As required by the European Aviation Safety Agency (EASA)'s CS 25.631 or the Federal Aviation Administration (FAA)'s 14 CFR § 25.571(e)(1) post Amdt 25-96, modern jet aircraft structures are designed for continued safe flight and landing after withstanding one 4 lb (1.8 kg) bird impact anywhere on the aircraft (including the flight deck windshields). Per the FAA's 14 CFR § 25.631, they must also withstand one 8 lb (3.6 kg) bird impact anywhere on the empennage. Flight deck windows on jet aircraft must be able to withstand one 4 lb (1.8 kg) bird collision without yielding or spalling. For the empennage, this is usually accomplished by designing redundant structures and protected locations for control system elements or protective devices such as splitter plates or energy-absorbing material. Often, one aircraft manufacturer will use similar protective design features for all of its aircraft models, to minimize testing and certification costs. Transport Canada also pays particular attention to these requirements during aircraft certification, considering there are many documented cases in North America of bird strikes with large Canada geese which weigh approximately 8 lb (3.6 kg) on average, and can sometimes weigh as much as 14.3 lb (6.5 kg).

At first, bird strike testing by manufacturers involved firing a bird carcass from a gas cannon and sabot system into the tested unit. The carcass was soon replaced with suitable density blocks, often gelatin, to ease testing. Current certification efforts are mainly conducted with limited testing, supported by more detailed analysis using computer simulation, although final testing usually involves some physical experiments (see birdstrike simulator).

Based on US National Transportation Safety Board recommendations following US Airways Flight 1549 in 2009, EASA proposed in 2017 that engines should also be capable of sustaining a bird strike in descent. During descent, turbofans turn more slowly than during takeoff and climb. This proposal was echoed a year later by the FAA; new regulations could apply for the Boeing NMA engines.

=== Wildlife management ===
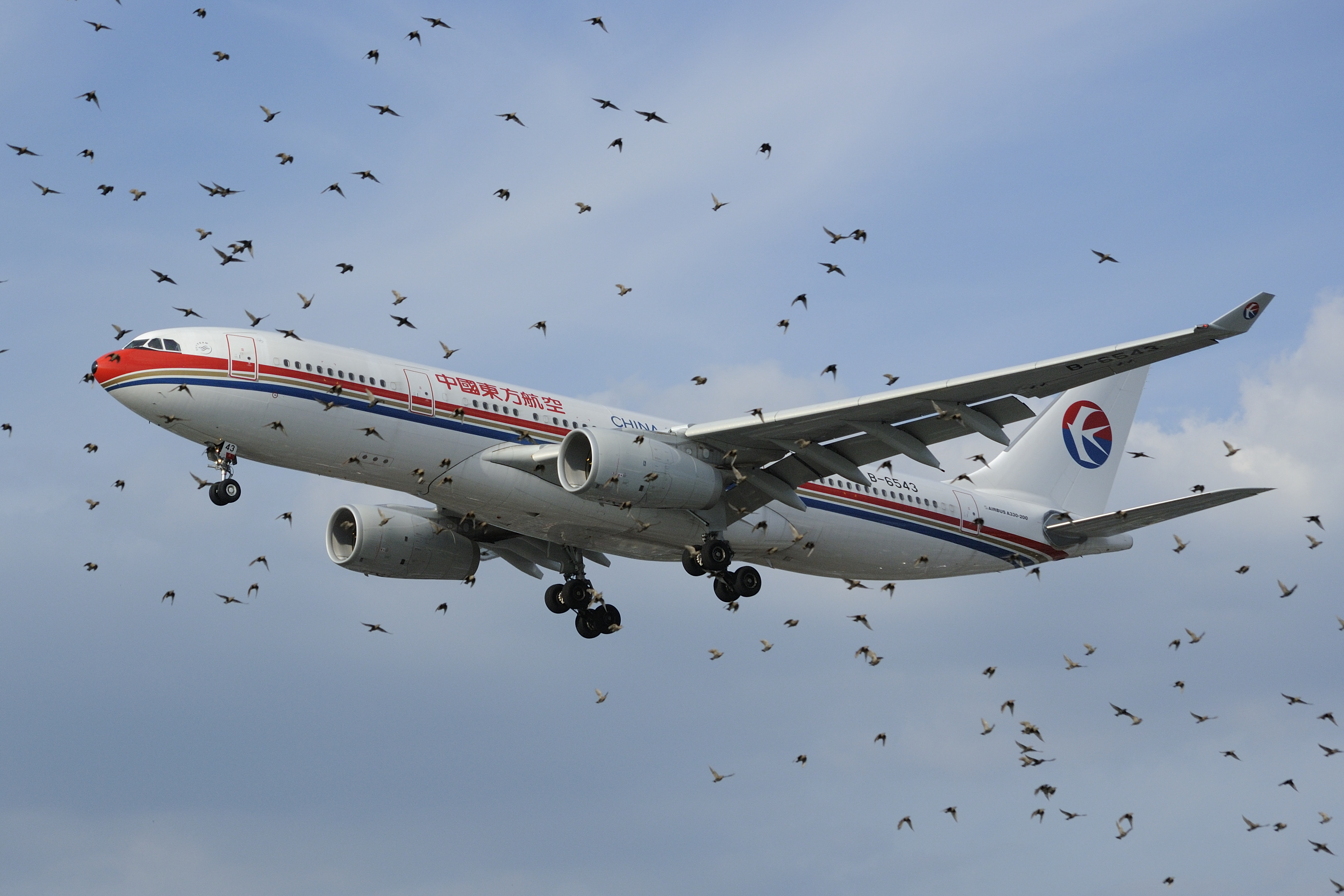
An Airbus A330 of China Eastern behind a flock of birds at London Heathrow

Though there are many methods available to wildlife managers at airports, no single method will work in all instances and with all species. Wildlife management in the airport environment can be grouped into two broad categories: non-lethal and lethal. Integration of multiple non-lethal methods with lethal methods results in the most effective airfield wildlife management strategy.

==== Non-lethal ====
Non-lethal management can be further broken down into habitat manipulation, exclusion, visual, auditory, tactile, or chemical repellents, and relocation.

===== Habitat manipulation =====
One of the primary reasons that wildlife is seen in airports is an abundance of food. Food resources on airports can be either removed or made less desirable. One of the most abundant food resources found on airports is turfgrass. This grass is planted to reduce runoff, control erosion, absorb jet wash, allow passage of emergency vehicles, and to be aesthetically pleasing. However, turfgrass is a preferred food source for species of birds that pose a serious risk to aircraft, chiefly the Canada goose (Branta canadensis). Turfgrass planted at airports should be a species that geese do not prefer (e.g. St. Augustine grass) and should be managed in such a way that reduces its attractiveness to other wildlife such as small rodents and raptors. It has been recommended that turfgrass be maintained at a height of 7–14 inches through regular mowing and fertilization.

Wetlands are another major attractant of wildlife in the airport environment. They are of particular concern because they attract waterfowl, which have a high potential to damage aircraft. With large areas of impervious surfaces, airports must employ methods to collect runoff and reduce its flow velocity. These best management practices often involve temporarily ponding runoff. Short of redesigning existing runoff control systems to include non-accessible water such as subsurface flow wetlands, frequent drawdowns and covering of exposed water with floating covers and wire grids should be employed. The implementation of covers and wire grids must not hinder emergency services.

===== Exclusion =====
Though excluding birds (and flying animals in general) from the entire airport environment is virtually impossible, it is possible to exclude deer and other mammals that constitute a small percentage of wildlife strikes. Three-meter-high fences made of chain link or woven wire, with barbed wire outriggers, are the most effective. When used as a perimeter fence, these fences also serve to keep unauthorized people off of the airport. Realistically, every fence must have gates. Gates that are left open allow deer and other mammals onto the airport. 15 foot (4.6 meter) long cattle guards have been shown to be effective at deterring deer up to 98% of the time.

Hangars with open superstructures often attract birds to nest and roost in. Hangar doors are often left open to increase ventilation, especially in the evenings. Birds in hangars are in proximity to the airfield and their droppings are both a health and damage concern. Netting is often deployed across the superstructure of a hangar denying access to the rafters where the birds roost and nest while still allowing the hangar doors to remain open for ventilation and aircraft movements. Strip curtains and door netting may also be used but are subject to improper use (e.g. tying the strips to the side of the door) by those working in the hangar.

===== Visual repellents =====
There have been a variety of visual repellent and harassment techniques used in airport wildlife management. They include using birds of prey and dogs, effigies, landing lights, and lasers. Birds of prey have been used with great effectiveness at landfills where there were large populations of feeding gulls. Dogs have also been used with success as visual deterrents and means of harassment for birds at airfields. Airport wildlife managers must consider the risk of knowingly releasing animals in the airport environment. Both birds of prey and dogs must be monitored by a handler when deployed and must be cared for when not deployed. Airport wildlife managers must consider the economics of these methods.

Effigies of both predators and conspecifics have been used with success to disperse gulls and vultures. The effigies of conspecifics are often placed in unnatural positions where they can freely move with the wind. Effigies have been found to be the most effective in situations where the nuisance birds have other options (e.g. other forage, loafing, and roosting areas) available. Time to habituation varies.

Lasers have been used with success to disperse several species of birds. However, lasers are species-specific as certain species will only react to certain wavelengths. Lasers become more effective as ambient light levels decrease, thereby limiting effectiveness during daylight hours. Some species show a very short time to habituation. The risks of lasers to aircrews must be evaluated when determining whether or not to deploy lasers on airfields. Southampton Airport utilizes a laser device which disables the laser past a certain elevation, eliminating the risk of the beam being shone directly at aircraft and air traffic control tower.

===== Auditory repellents =====
Auditory repellents are commonly used in both agricultural and aviation contexts. Devices such as propane exploders (cannons), pyrotechnics, and bioacoustics are frequently deployed on airports. Propane exploders are capable of creating noises of approximately 130 decibels. They can be programmed to fire at designated intervals, can be remote controlled, or motion activated. Due to their stationary and often predictable nature, wildlife quickly becomes habituated to propane cannons. Lethal control may be used to extend the effectiveness of propane exploders.

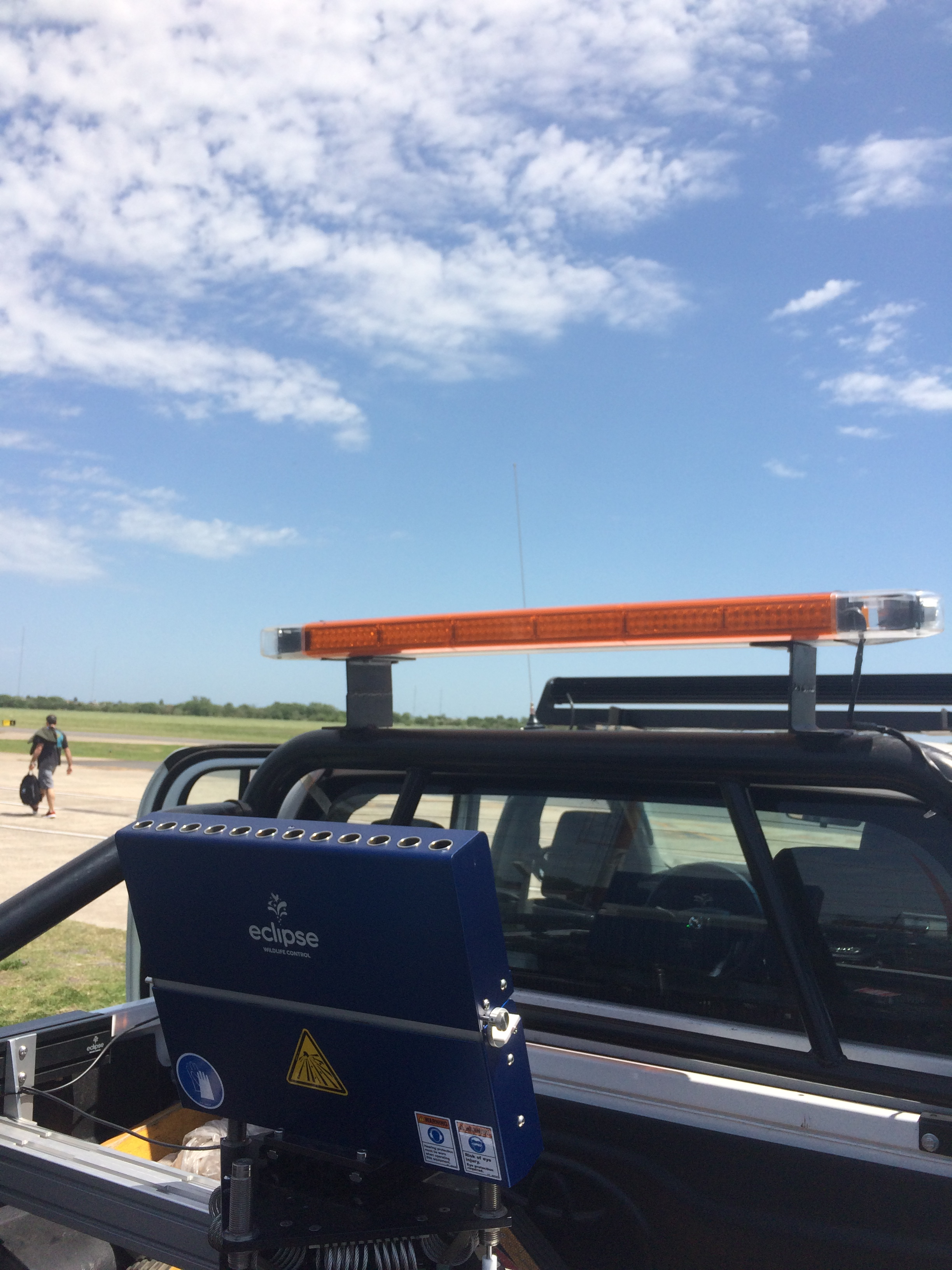
Wireless specialized launcher mounted in an airport vehicle

Pyrotechnics utilizing either an exploding shell or a screamer can effectively scare birds away from runways. They are commonly launched from a 12 gauge shotgun or a flare pistol, or from a wireless specialized launcher and as such, can be aimed to allow control personnel to "steer" the species that is being harassed. Birds show varying degrees of habituation to pyrotechnics. Studies have shown that lethal reinforcement of pyrotechnic harassment has extended its usefulness. Screamer type cartridges are still intact at the end of their flight (as opposed to exploding shells that destroy themselves) constituting a foreign object damage hazard and must be picked up. The use of pyrotechnics is considered "take" by the U.S. Fish and Wildlife Service (USFWS) and USFWS must be consulted if federally threatened or endangered species could be affected. Pyrotechnics are a potential fire hazard and must be deployed judiciously in dry conditions.

Bioacoustics, or the playing of conspecific distress or predator calls to frighten animals, is widely used. This method relies on the animal's evolutionary danger response. One limitation is that bioacoustics are species-specific and birds may quickly become habituated to them. They should therefore not be used as a primary means of control.

In 2012, operators at Gloucestershire Airport in England stated that songs by the American-Swiss singer Tina Turner were more effective than animal noises for scaring birds from its runways.

===== Tactile repellents =====
Sharpened spikes to deter perching and loafing are commonly used. Generally, large birds require different applications than small birds do.

===== Chemical repellents =====
There are only two chemical bird repellents registered for use in the United States, methyl anthranilate and anthraquinone. Methyl anthranilate is a primary repellent that produces an immediate unpleasant sensation that is reflexive and does not have to be learned. As such it is most effective for transient populations of birds. Methyl anthranilate has been used with great success at rapidly dispersing birds from flight lines at Homestead Air Reserve Station. Anthraquinone is a secondary repellent that has a laxative effect that is not instantaneous. Because of this, it is most effective on resident populations of wildlife that will have time to learn an aversive response.

===== Relocation =====
Relocation of raptors from airports is often considered preferable to lethal control methods by both biologists and the public. There are complex legal issues surrounding the capture and relocation of species protected by the Migratory Bird Treaty Act of 1918 and the Bald and Golden Eagle Protection Act of 1940. Prior to capture, proper permits must be obtained and the high mortality rates as well as the risk of disease transmission associated with relocation must be weighed. Between 2008 and 2010, U.S. Department of Agriculture Wildlife Services personnel relocated 606 red-tailed hawks from airports in the United States after the failure of multiple harassment attempts. The return rate of these hawks was 6%; the relocation mortality rate for these hawks was never determined.

==== Lethal ====
Lethal wildlife control on airports falls into two categories: reinforcement of other non-lethal methods and population control.

===== Reinforcement =====
The premise of effigies, pyrotechnics, and propane exploders is that there be a perceived immediate danger to the species to be dispersed. Initially, the sight of an unnaturally positioned effigy or the sound of pyrotechnics or exploders is enough to elicit a danger response from wildlife. As wildlife become habituated to non-lethal methods, the culling of small numbers of wildlife in the presence of conspecifics can restore the danger response.

===== Population control =====
Under certain circumstances, lethal wildlife control is needed to control the population of a species. This control can be localized or regional. Localized population control is often used to control species that are residents of the airfield such as deer that have bypassed the perimeter fence. In this instance sharpshooting would be highly effective, such as is seen at Chicago O'Hare International Airport.

Regional population control has been used on species that cannot be excluded from the airport environment. A nesting colony of laughing gulls at Jamaica Bay Wildlife Refuge contributed to 98–315 bird strikes per year, in 1979–1992, at adjacent John F. Kennedy International Airport (JFK). Though JFK had an active bird management program that precluded birds from feeding and loafing on the airport, it did not stop them from overflying the airport to other feeding sites. U.S. Department of Agriculture Wildlife Services personnel began shooting all gulls that flew over the airport, hypothesizing that eventually, the gulls would alter their flight patterns. They shot 28,352 gulls in two years (approximately half of the population at Jamaica Bay and 5–6% of the nationwide population per year). Strikes with laughing gulls decreased by 89% by 1992. However this was more a function of the population reduction than the gulls altering their flight pattern.

=== Flight path ===
Pilots should not take off or land in the presence of wildlife and should avoid migratory routes, wildlife reserves, estuaries and other sites where birds may congregate. When operating in the presence of bird flocks, pilots should seek to climb above 3,000 feet (910 m) as rapidly as possible as most bird strikes occur below that altitude. Additionally, pilots should slow down their aircraft when confronted with birds. The energy that must be dissipated in the collision is approximately the relative kinetic energy ($E_{k}$) of the bird, defined by the equation $E_{k} = \frac{1}{2} m v^{2}$ where $m$ is the mass of the bird and $v$ is the relative velocity (the difference of the velocities of the bird and the plane, resulting in a lower absolute value if they are flying in the same direction and higher absolute value if they are flying in opposite directions). Therefore, the speed of the aircraft is much more important than the size of the bird when it comes to reducing energy transfer in a collision. The same can be said for jet engines: the slower the rotation of the engine, the less energy which will be imparted onto the engine at collision.

The body density of the bird is also a parameter that influences the amount of damage caused.

The United States Air Force (USAF)'s Avian Hazard Advisory System (AHAS) uses near-real-time data from the National Weather Service's NEXRAD system to provide current bird hazard conditions for published military low-level routes, ranges, and military operating areas (MOAs). Additionally, AHAS incorporates weather forecast data with the Bird Avoidance Model (BAM) to predict soaring bird activity within the next 24 hours and then defaults to the BAM for planning purposes when activity is scheduled outside the 24-hour window. The BAM is a static historical hazard model based on many years of bird distribution data from the Christmas Bird Count, the Breeding Bird Survey, and National Wildlife Refuge data. The BAM also incorporates potentially hazardous bird attractions such as landfills and golf courses. AHAS is now an integral part of military low-level mission planning, with aircrew being able to access the current bird hazard conditions at a dedicated website. AHAS will provide relative risk assessments for the planned mission and give aircrew the opportunity to select a less hazardous route should the planned route be rated severe or moderate. Prior to 2003, the USAF BASH Team bird strike database indicated that approximately 25% of all strikes were associated with low-level routes and bombing ranges. More importantly, these strikes accounted for more than 50% of all of the reported damage costs. After a decade of using AHAS for avoiding routes with severe ratings, the strike percentage associated with low-level flight operations has been reduced to 12% and associated costs cut in half.

Avian radar is an important tool for aiding in bird strike mitigation as part of overall safety management systems at civilian and military airfields. Properly designed and equipped avian radars can track thousands of birds simultaneously in real-time, night and day, through 360 degrees of coverage, out to ranges of 10 km (6.2 mi) and beyond for flocks, updating every target's position (longitude, latitude, altitude), speed, heading, and size every 2–3 seconds. Data from these systems can be used to generate information products ranging from real-time threat alerts to historical analyses of bird activity patterns in both time and space. The FAA and United States Department of Defense (DoD) have conducted extensive science-based field testing and validation of commercial avian radar systems for civil and military applications, respectively. The FAA used evaluations of commercial three-dimensional avian radar systems developed and marketed by Accipiter Radar as the basis for an advisory circular and a guidance letter on using Airport Improvement Program funds to acquire avian radar systems at Part 139 airports. Similarly, the DoD-sponsored Integration and Validation of Avian Radars (IVAR) project evaluated the functional and performance characteristics of Accipiter avian radars under operational conditions at Navy, Marine Corps, and Air Force airfields. Accipiter avian radar systems operating at Seattle–Tacoma International Airport, Chicago O'Hare International Airport, and Marine Corps Air Station Cherry Point made significant contributions to the evaluations carried out in the aforementioned FAA and DoD initiatives.

In 2003, a US company, DeTect, developed the only production model bird radar in operational use for real-time, tactical bird–aircraft strike avoidance by air traffic controllers. These systems are operational at both commercial airports and military airfields. The system has widely used technology available for BASH management and for real-time detection, tracking and alerting of hazardous bird activity at commercial airports, military airfields, and military training and bombing ranges. After extensive evaluation and on-site testing, MERLIN technology was chosen by NASA and was ultimately used for detecting and tracking dangerous vulture activity during the 22 Space Shuttle launches from 2006 to the conclusion of the program in 2011. The USAF has contracted DeTect since 2003 to provide the Avian Hazard Advisory System (AHAS) previously mentioned.

The Netherlands Organisation for Applied Scientific Research, a research and development organization, has developed the successful ROBIN (Radar Observation of Bird Intensity) for the Royal Netherlands Air Force (RNLAF). ROBIN is a near real-time monitoring system for flight movements of birds. ROBIN identifies flocks of birds within the signals of large radar systems. This information is used to warn air force pilots during take-off and landing. Years of observation of bird migration with ROBIN have also provided a better insight into bird migration behavior, which has had an influence on averting collisions with birds, and therefore on flight safety. Since the implementation of the ROBIN system at the RNLAF, the number of collisions between birds and aircraft in the vicinity of military airbases has decreased by more than 50%.

There are no civil aviation counterparts to the above military strategies. Some experimentation with small portable radar units has taken place at some airports, but no standard has been adopted for radar warning nor has any governmental policy regarding warnings been implemented.

== History ==
=== In aviation ===
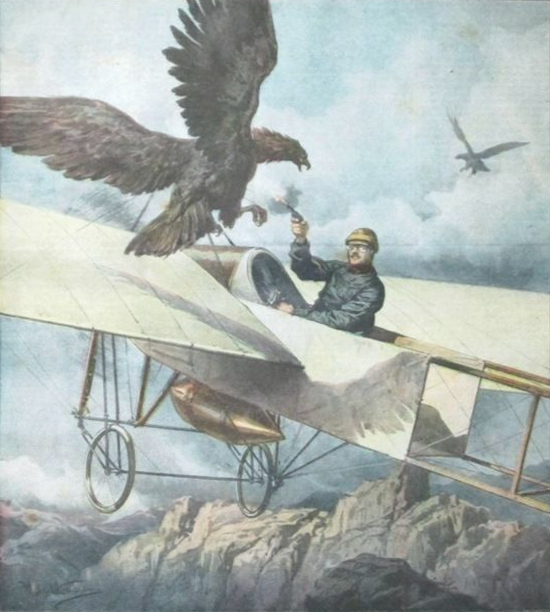
A painting depicting Eugène Gilbert in a Bleriot XI being attacked by an eagle over the Pyrenees in 1911

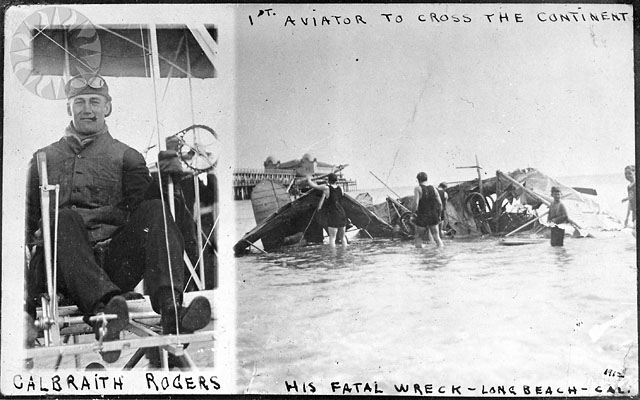
Rodgers in 1912 fatal crash

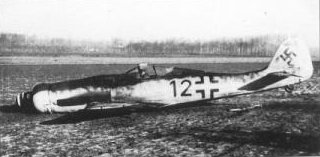
A Fw 190D-9 of 10./JG 54 Grünherz, pilot (Leutnant Theo Nibel), downed by a partridge which flew into the nose radiator near Brussels on 1 January 1945

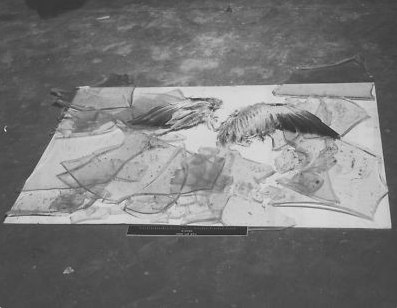
October 31. 1964 Goose wings lie alongside fragments of Freeman's T-38 canopy.

The Federal Aviation Administration (FAA) estimates bird strikes cost US aviation 400 million dollars annually and have resulted in over 200 worldwide deaths since 1988. In the United Kingdom, the Central Science Laboratory estimated that worldwide, birdstrikes cost airlines around US$1.2 billion annually. This includes repair cost and lost revenue while the damaged aircraft is out of service. In 2003, there were 4,300 bird strikes listed by the United States Air Force and 5,900 by US civil aircraft.

The first reported bird strike was by Orville Wright in 1905. According to the Wright brothers' diaries, "Orville [...] flew 4,751 meters in 4 minutes 45 seconds, four complete circles. Twice passed over the fence into Beard's cornfield. Chased flock of birds for two rounds and killed one which fell on top of the upper surface and after a time fell off when swinging a sharp curve."

During the 1911 Paris to Madrid air race, French pilot Eugène Gilbert encountered an angry mother eagle over the Pyrenees. Gilbert, flying an open-cockpit Blériot XI, was able to ward off the large bird by firing pistol shots at it but did not kill it.

The first recorded bird strike fatality was reported in 1912 when aero-pioneer Calbraith Rodgers collided with a gull which became jammed in his aircraft control cables. He crashed at Long Beach, California, was pinned under the wreckage, and drowned.

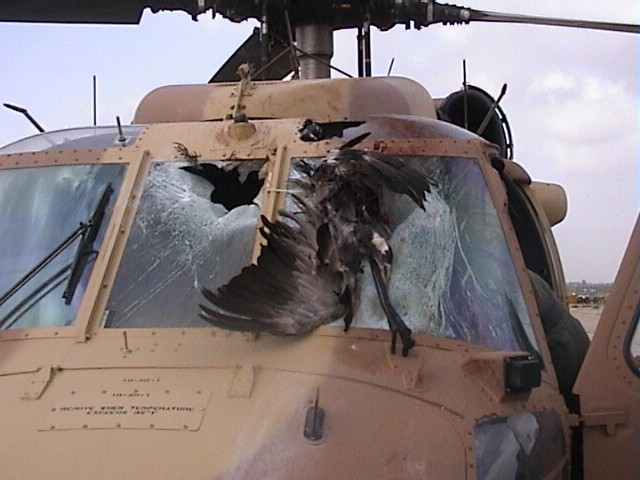
A Sikorsky UH-60 Black Hawk after a collision with a common crane (bird), and resulting failure of the windshield

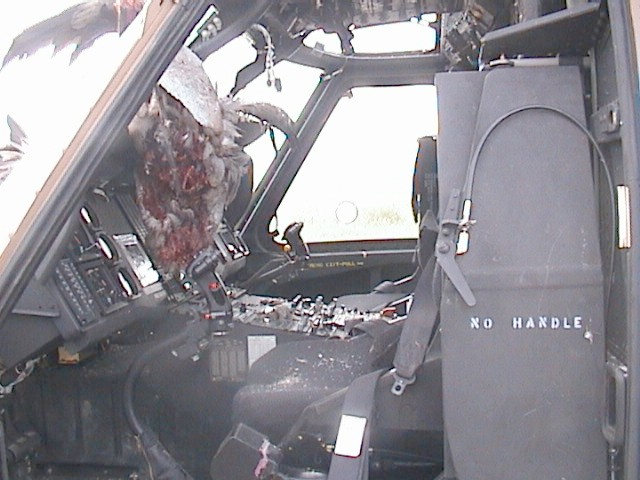
The same UH-60, as seen from the inside

Before the crash of Jeju Air Flight 2216, the then greatest loss of life directly linked to a bird strike was on October 4, 1960, when a Lockheed L-188 Electra, flying from Boston as Eastern Air Lines Flight 375, flew through a flock of common starlings during take-off, damaging all four engines. The aircraft crashed into Boston Harbor shortly after takeoff, with 62 fatalities out of 72 passengers. Subsequently, minimum bird ingestion standards for jet engines were developed by the FAA.

NASA astronaut Theodore Freeman was killed in 1964 when a goose shattered the plexiglass cockpit canopy of his Northrop T-38 Talon. Shards of plexiglass were ingested by the engines, leading to a fatal crash.

On November 12, 1975, the flight crew of Overseas National Airways Flight 032 initiated a rejected takeoff after accelerating through a large flock of gulls at John F. Kennedy International Airport, resulting in a runway excursion. Of the 139 aircraft occupants, all survived, while the aircraft was destroyed by an intense post-crash fire. An investigation was carried out on the #3 engine by General Electric Aircraft Engines (GEAE) in Ohio. Disassembly revealed that several engine fan blades were damaged and broken, causing blades to abrade the epoxy fan shroud; as the epoxy combusted, it ignited jet fuel leaking from a broken fuel line. However, GEAE denied that the ingested birds were the underlying cause of the damage. Company investigators speculated that a tire or landing gear failure had occurred prior to the bird strikes, and that tire, wheel or landing gear debris ingested into the engine caused the fan blade damage and cut the fuel line. To demonstrate that the General Electric CF6 engine was capable of withstanding a bird strike, the National Transportation Safety Board conducted a test with a sample engine.

In 1988, Ethiopian Airlines Flight 604 sucked pigeons into both engines during takeoff and then crashed, killing 35 passengers.

In 1995, a Dassault Falcon 20 crashed at Paris–Le Bourget Airport during an emergency landing attempt after sucking lapwings into an engine, which caused an engine failure and a fire in the airplane's fuselage; all 10 people on board were killed.

On September 22, 1995, a U.S. Air Force Boeing E-3 Sentry AWACS aircraft (Callsign Yukla 27, serial number 77-0354), crashed shortly after takeoff from Elmendorf AFB. The aircraft lost power in both port side engines after these engines ingested several Canada geese during takeoff. It crashed about two miles (3.2 km) from the runway, killing all 24 crew members on board.

On November 28, 2004, the nose landing gear of KLM Flight 1673, a Boeing 737-400, struck a bird during takeoff at Amsterdam Airport Schiphol. The incident was reported to air traffic control, the landing gear was raised normally, and the flight continued normally to its destination. Upon touching down at Barcelona International Airport, the aircraft started deviating to the left of the runway centreline. The crew applied right rudder, braking, and the nose wheel steering tiller but could not keep the aircraft on the runway. After it veered off the paved surface of the runway at about 100 knots, the jet went through an area of soft sand. The nose landing gear leg collapsed and the left main landing gear leg detached from its fittings shortly before the aircraft came to a stop perched over the edge of a drainage canal. All 140 passengers and six crew evacuated safely, but the aircraft itself had to be written off. The cause was discovered to be a broken cable in the nose wheel steering system caused by the bird collision. Contributing to the snapped cable was the improper application of grease during routine maintenance which led to severe wear of the cable.

During the launch of STS-114 on July 26, 2005, a large bird (presumed to be a turkey vulture) was struck by Space Shuttle Discovery shortly after liftoff. The collision proved fatal to the bird; however, the Space Shuttle was undamaged.

In April 2007, a Thomsonfly Boeing 757 from Manchester Airport to Lanzarote Airport suffered a bird strike when at least one bird, thought to be a crow, was ingested by the starboard engine. The plane landed safely back at Manchester Airport a while later. The incident was captured by two plane spotters on opposite sides of the airport, as well as the emergency calls picked up by a plane spotter's radio.

On November 10, 2008, Ryanair Flight 4102 from Frankfurt to Rome made an emergency landing at Ciampino Airport after multiple bird strikes caused both engines to fail. After touchdown, the left main landing gear collapsed, and the aircraft briefly veered off the runway. Passengers and crew were evacuated through the starboard emergency exits.

On January 4, 2009, a Sikorsky S-76 helicopter hit a red-tailed hawk in Louisiana. The hawk hit the helicopter just above the windscreen. The impact forced the activation of the engine fire suppression control handles, retarding the throttles and causing the engines to lose power. Eight of the nine people on board died in the subsequent crash; the survivor, a passenger, was seriously injured.

On January 15, 2009, US Airways Flight 1549 from LaGuardia Airport to Charlotte/Douglas International Airport ditched into the Hudson River after experiencing a loss of both turbines. The engine failure was caused by running into a flock of geese at an altitude of about 3,200 ft (980 metres), shortly after takeoff. All 150 passengers and 5 crew members were safely evacuated after a successful water landing. On May 28, 2010, the NTSB published its final report into the accident.

On August 15, 2019, Ural Airlines Flight 178 from Moscow–Zhukovsky to Simferopol, Crimea, suffered a bird strike after taking off from Zhukovsky and crash landed in a cornfield 5 kilometers away from the airport. 74 people were injured, all with minor injuries.

On September 16, 2023, the Italian Frecce Tricolori Aermacchi MB-339 squadron departed from the Turin Airport for an airshow. One jet experienced a sudden loss of engine power shortly after takeoff, possibly due to a bird strike, and crashed. The pilot ejected before the ground impact and was admitted to the hospital for burn injuries. A five-year-old girl died in the crash and subsequent fireball, and three other people were brought to the hospital for burns.

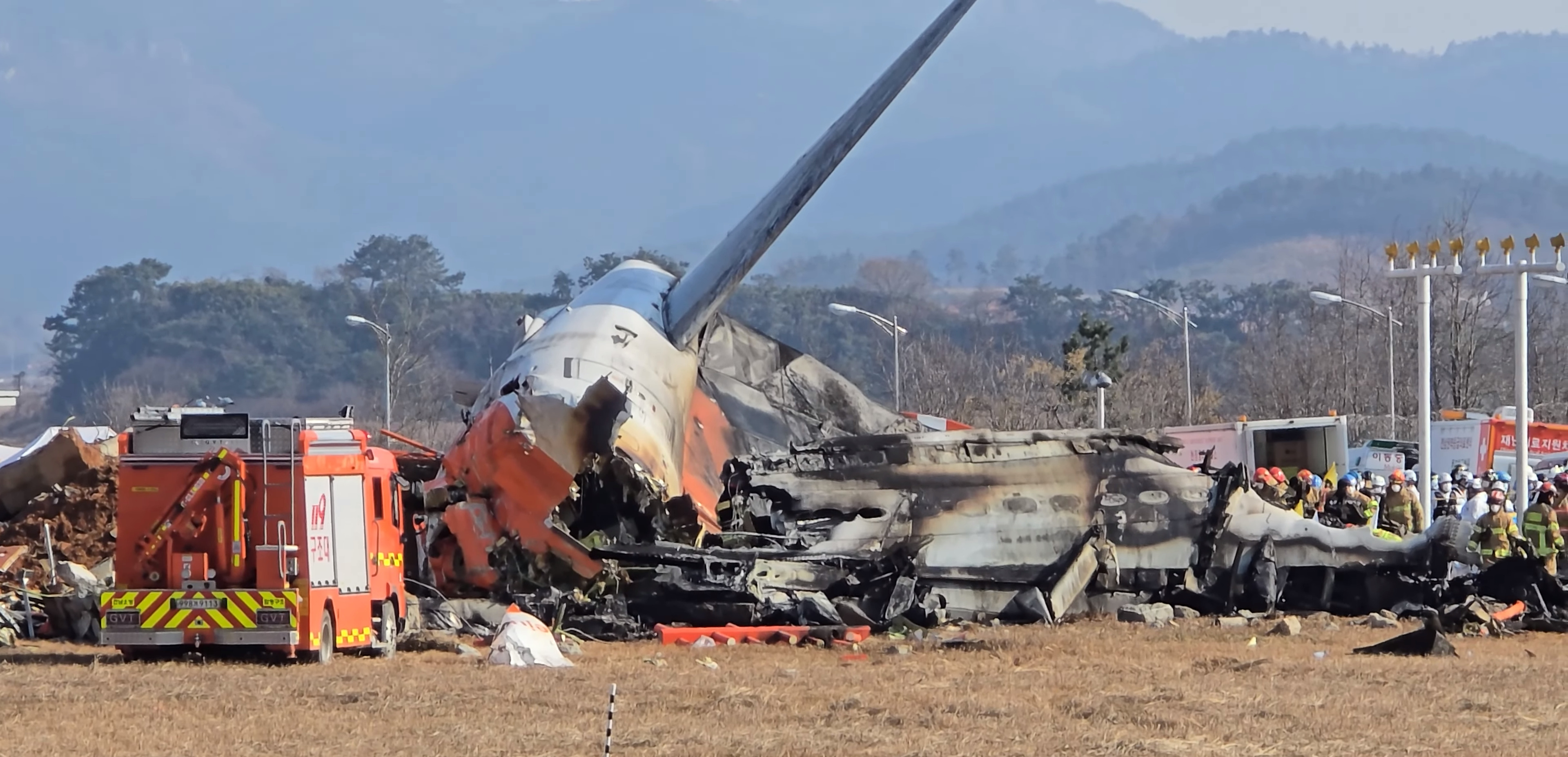
Wreckage of Jeju Air Flight 2216

The greatest loss of life directly linked to a bird strike was on 29 December 2024, when a Boeing 737-800, flying from Bangkok, Thailand to Muan, South Korea as Jeju Air Flight 2216, flew through a flock of birds during landing, leading to a dual engine failure. The aircraft crashed at Muan International Airport after a runway excursion into a concrete structure during a belly landing, resulting in 179 fatalities out of 181 occupants.

=== In ground transportation ===
During the 1952 edition of the Carrera Panamericana, Karl Kling and Hans Klenk suffered a bird strike incident when the Mercedes-Benz W194 was struck by a vulture in the windscreen. During a long right-hand bend in the opening stage taken at almost 200 km/h (120 mph), Kling failed to spot vultures sitting by the side of the road. When the vultures were scattered after hearing the loud W194 coming towards them, one vulture impacted through the windscreen on the passenger side. The impact was severe enough to briefly knock Klenk unconscious. Despite bleeding badly from facial injuries caused by the shattered windscreen, Klenk ordered Kling to maintain speed. He waited until a tire change almost 70 km (43 mi) later to clean himself and the car up, and the two eventually won the race. For extra protection, eight vertical steel bars were bolted over the new windscreen. Kling and Klenk discussed the species and size of the dead bird, agreeing that it had a minimum 115-centimetre (45 in) wingspan and weighed as much as five fattened geese.

Alan Stacey's fatal accident during the 1960 Belgian Grand Prix was caused when a bird hit him in the face on lap 25, causing his Lotus 18-Climax to crash at the fast, sweeping right hand Burnenville curve. According to fellow driver Innes Ireland's testimony in a mid-1980s edition of Road & Track magazine, spectators claimed that a bird had flown into Stacey's face while he was approaching the curve. Ireland stated that the impact might have knocked him unconscious, or possibly killed him by breaking his neck or inflicting a fatal head injury even before the car crashed.

On lap 2 of the 1991 Daytona 500 driver Dale Earnhardt hit a seagull causing cosmetic damage to the front of his car. Despite this he would fight all the way up to second before spinning on the last lap and finishing fifth.

On March 30, 1999, during the inaugural run of the hypercoaster Apollo's Chariot in Virginia, passenger Fabio Lanzoni suffered a bird strike by a goose and required three stitches to his face. The roller coaster has a height of over 200 feet (61 m) and reaches speeds over 70 miles per hour (110 km/h).

== In popular culture ==
- In the March 1942 Boy's Own Paper story Biggles and the Purple Plague, by Capt. W. E. Johns, a locust swarm threatens the ability of pilots to control their planes.
- A 1964 episode of the Jonny Quest animated TV show features a giant condor ripping the wing off of a Fokker D.VII World War One fighter plane.
- In the 1965 film Sands of the Kalahari, a twin-engine plane is brought down by a locust swarm that smears the windscreen and clogs the carburetor intakes.
- In the 1989 film Indiana Jones and the Last Crusade, Henry Jones Sr. (Sean Connery) uses an umbrella to scare a flock of birds into the path of an attacking Luftwaffe fighter plane, causing it to sustain multiple bird strikes and crash, saving his life and the life of his son, Indiana Jones (Harrison Ford).
- In the 1997 film The Edge, starring Anthony Hopkins and Alec Baldwin, their floatplane crashes after encountering bird strike, leaving the two stranded in the wilderness with their friend.
- In the 2011 animated film Rio the plane the smugglers used to escape, a Short SC.7 Skyvan, is hit by the film's main villain, Nigel the cockatoo, after being sent flying by a fire extinguisher from Blu, the main protagonist of the film attaching the fire extinguisher to his leg, causing the plane to go down, forcing the smugglers to ditch the plane and jump out of it.
- The 2016 film Sully shows US Airways Flight 1549 captained by Chesley Sullenberger that was forced to ditch on the Hudson River in 2009 after sustaining a bird strike shortly after takeoff from LaGuardia Airport.
- In the 2022 film Top Gun: Maverick Phoenix and Bob are forced to eject after a bird strike causes the engines of their F/A-18F to flame out.

== See also ==
- AEDC Ballistic Range S-3
- Bird–window collisions
- Carla Dove, ornithologist and researcher specializing in bird strikes
- Chicken gun
- Foreign object damage
- Jeju Air Flight 2216, 2024 aircraft crash involving a bird strike with 175 fatalities
- Mid-air collision, an aerial collision between aircraft
- Roxie Collie Laybourne
- Richard Dolbeer, Scientist specializing in human-wildlife conflicts
- Stray animals at Indian airports
- Towerkill
