= Towerkill =

Bird collision with an antenna tower

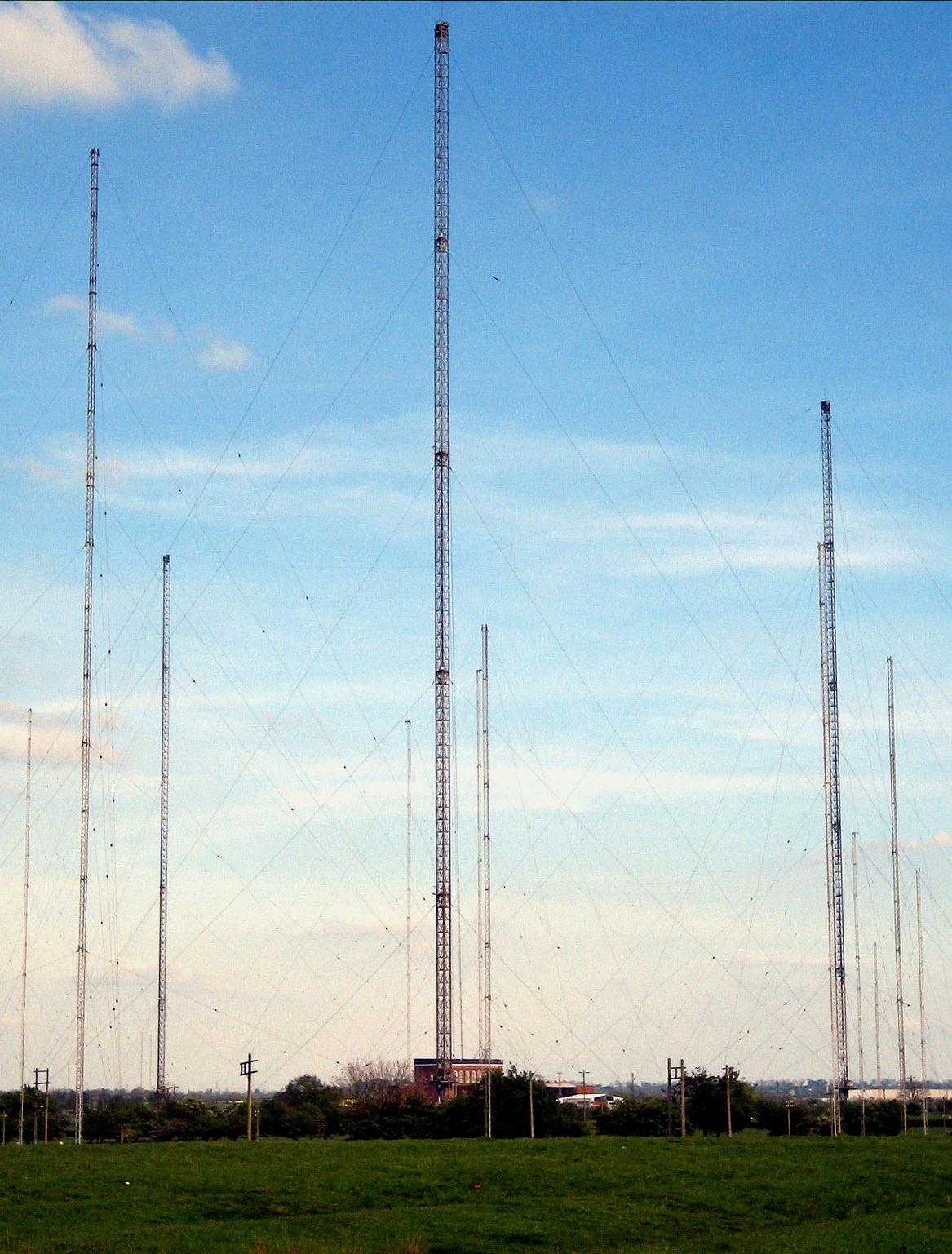
Guy wires pose a fatal threat to birds, which often circle the tower lights at night.

Towerkill is a phenomenon in which birds are killed by collisions with antenna towers. In poor visibility conditions, birds may simply fly into towers' guy-wires. Night illuminations around the towers can also disrupt migration patterns, with disoriented birds colliding with the structure. Research indicates that blinking lights can reduce deaths without diminishing visibility by aircraft.

== Overview ==
In the United States, the US Fish and Wildlife Service estimated (sometime prior to 2009) that between 4 and 50 million birds are killed each year by tower kill. The effect on overall bird populations by towerkill may be small, but the phenomenon is of considerable concern to ornithologists, because many endangered bird species are being killed, and because so many birds are killed in such a small area of land. In at least one instance, several thousand birds were killed at a single tower in one night. Additionally, the unnatural lights on communication towers disrupt bird migration patterns in ways that are still not fully understood. At least 231 species have been affected, with neotropical migrants making up a large proportion of all species killed.

== Mechanisms ==
There are two primary mechanisms of bird death due to communications towers. The first is the "blind kill" where birds flying in poor visibility do not see the guy-wires in time to avoid them. This is more of a threat for faster flying birds such as waterfowl or shorebirds. Slower and more agile birds, such as songbirds, are not as likely to succumb to blind collision.

Communications towers that are lighted at night for aviation safety may help reduce bird collisions caused by poor visibility, but they bring about a second, even more deadly mechanism for mortality. When there is a low cloud ceiling, hazy or foggy conditions, lights on a tower reflect off water or other particles in the air creating an illuminated area around the tower. Migrating birds lose their stellar cues for nocturnal migration in such conditions. In addition, they often lose any broad orienting perspective they might have had on the landscape. When passing the lighted area, it may be that the increased visibility around the tower becomes the strongest cue the birds have for navigation, and thus they tend to remain in the lighted space near the tower, afraid to leave. Mortality occurs when they run into the structure and its guy wires, or even other migrating birds as more and more passing birds aggregate in the relatively small, lighted space. The lights are not documented to attract birds from afar, but appear to hold birds that fly into the illuminated vicinity. Lights are required by the US Federal Communications Commission (FCC) on any tower taller than 199 feet (61 m), or on shorter towers if they are near airports. In 2008, it was estimated there were roughly 125,000 lit towers in the US and more than 7,000 new towers are constructed each year.

Researchers at the University of Southern California reported in 2012 that red lights are worse than white lights, and switching to blinking lights can cut fatalities by half without reducing visibility by aircraft. In a 25-year study of bird mortality at the 314-foot (96 m) tower at Tall Timbers Research Station near Tallahassee, Florida, US, kills occurred nearly every night from mid-August through mid-November. Moderate numbers of migrating birds were killed under perfectly clear skies, but the toll increased markedly with overcast conditions. Researchers believe the attraction to lighted regions results in most towerkill, and numerous studies have been conducted to further understand the phenomena.

In May 2012, the US Federal Aviation Administration (FAA) published a report which concluded that as long as the brighter flashing lights remained active, extinguishing the steady burning red lights on communication towers at night would still provide enough conspicuity for pilots, and result in significantly fewer avian fatalities. This change would also save tower operators maintenance and energy costs. Since the report was published, the FAA and FCC have approved the change in lighting systems, and it is now an option for tower operators to change the lights on their existing towers, or to build new towers with the new lighting system.

== Wind turbines ==
Wind turbines represent a much smaller threat to birds, due to being much lower in number and lacking guy wires. The American Bird Conservancy estimated wind turbines kill 10,000 to 40,000 birds a year, which is a smaller percentage compared to communication towers, which kill 40 to 60 million a year, as estimated by the energy trade group American Wind Energy Association. Overall, as of 2010, wind turbines were estimated to cause about one-tenth of a percent of all unnatural bird deaths in the United States each year. A 2013 survey of published studies estimated that the total number of bird kills for all single-pole turbine wind farms in the United States was 140,000 to 328,000 per year.

== See also ==
- Bird–skyscraper collisions
- Bird strike
