= Roxie Collie Laybourne =

American ornithologist (1910–2003)

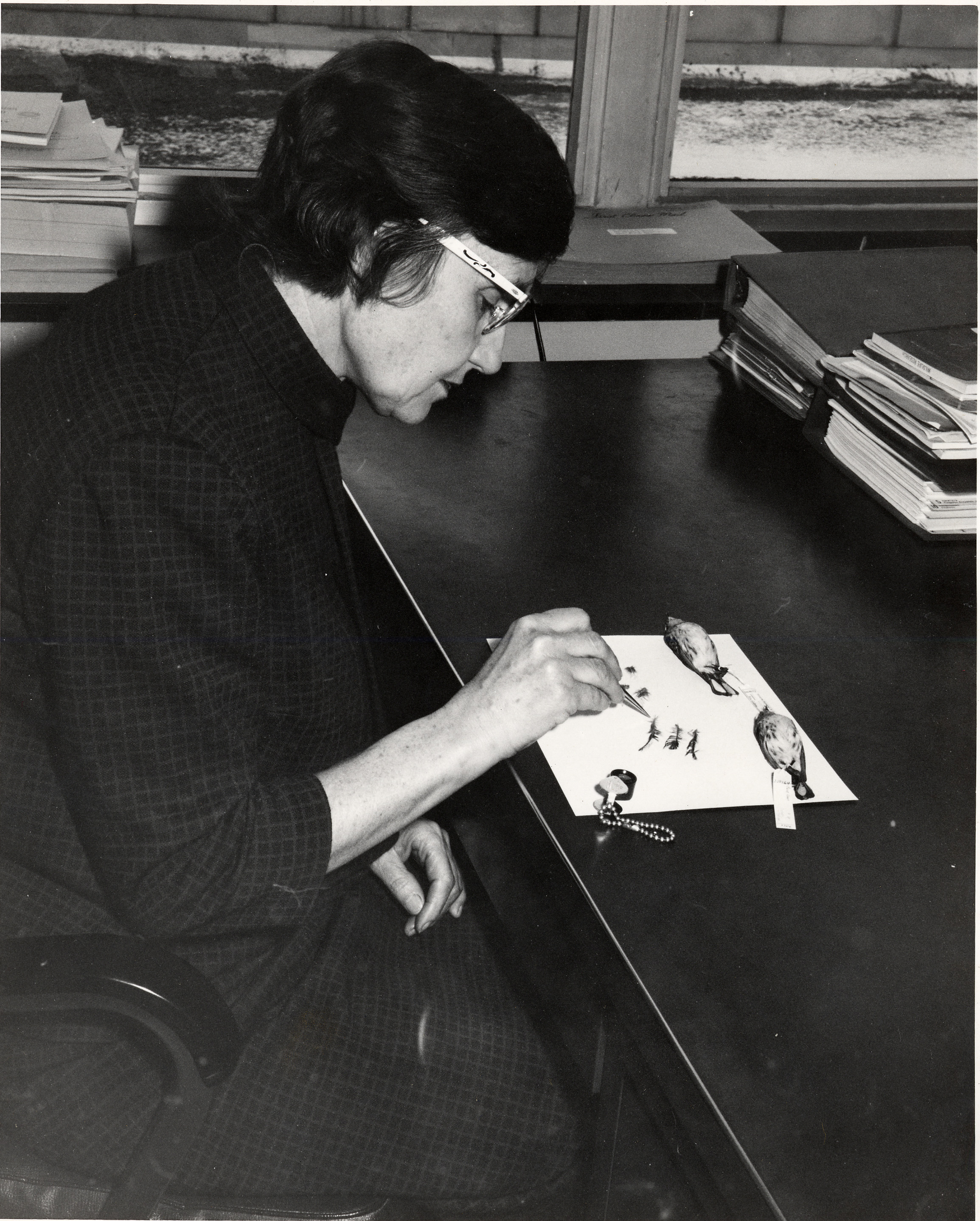
- Laybourne identifying bird feathers, circa 1944.
- Born: September 15, 1910; Fayetteville, North Carolina
- Died: August 7, 2003 (aged 92); Manassas, Virginia
- Education: Meredith College, George Washington University
- Spouse(s): Philip Simpson, Edgar G. Laybourne
- Children: Robert Laybourne
- Scientific career
- Fields: forensic ornithology
- Workplaces: National Museum of Natural History, U.S. Fish and Wildlife Service

Roxie Collie Simpson Laybourne (September 15, 1910 – August 7, 2003) was an American ornithologist born in Fayetteville, North Carolina. Known as the “Feather Lady”, she pioneered the study of forensic ornithology while at the National Museum of Natural History; these forensic techniques for identifying species of birds involved in bird strikes led to aircraft safety improvements.

== Early life ==
Laybourne was raised in Farmville, North Carolina. She was the eldest of 15. When she was young she preferred playing baseball to other activities such as learning to sew.

== Education and career ==
Laybourne earned her B.A. in mathematics and general science from Meredith College in 1932 and her M.S. in plant ecology from George Washington University in 1951 with a thesis on mosses. She worked for the North Carolina State Museum of Natural History in its taxidermy and exhibit departments in 1932, as well as the National Fisheries Laboratory, the United States National Museum from 1944 to 1946, and the Bird and Mammal Laboratories of the U.S. Fish and Wildlife Service from 1946 to 1974, before retiring and joining the National Museum of Natural History as a research associate. While at the National Museum of Natural History, Laybourne pioneered the study of forensic ornithology. She worked as a feather specialist for the Smithsonian Institution.

During her career, Laybourne developed "the speciality of identifying dead birds from their feathers to learn what types of birds struck planes." This information was instrumental in safety improvements within the manufacturing of aircraft engines, the development of military fighter canopies, and the creation of runway management plans. Laybourne's skills in forensic ornithology helped solve around 1,000 cases of bird-related airplane incidents a year.

In addition to her employers, Laybourne's expertise aided the Federal Aviation Administration, the Federal Bureau of Investigation, General Electric, the National Transportation Safety Board, Pratt and Whitney, and Rolls-Royce. She also taught bird-skinning courses to many budding ornithologists.

== Awards and honors ==
Laybourne's work was recognized by the Air Force Bird Strike Committee in 1966 with its lifetime achievement award. She also received the Alumna of the Year award in 1980 from Meredith College and an Alumni Achievement Award from George Washington University in 1984.
