= Chicken gun =

Device to simulate bird strikes on aircraft

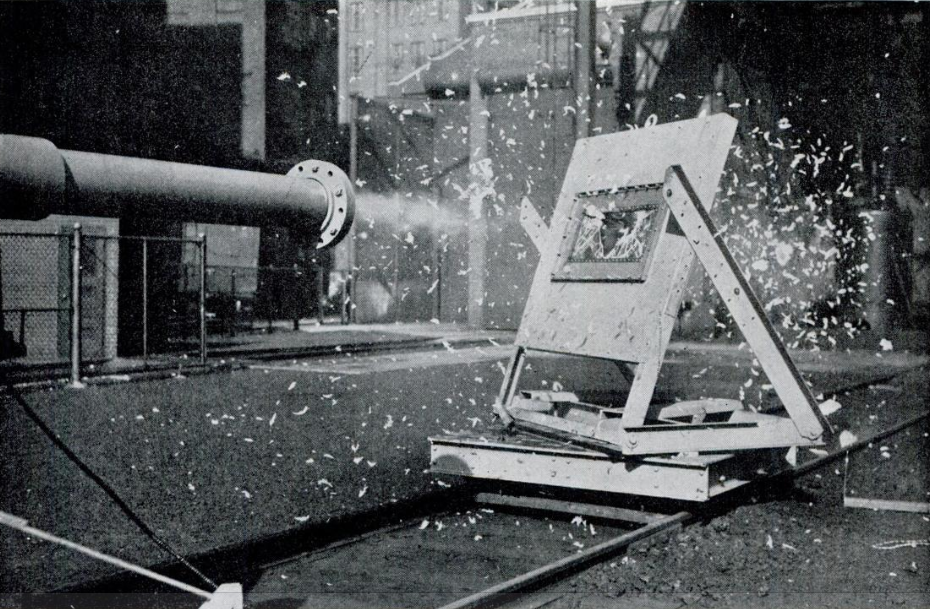
The first chicken gun, built in 1942 by the US Civil Aeronautics Administration and the Westinghouse Electric and Manufacturing Company, being fired at a glass panel.

A chicken gun or flight impact simulator is a large-diameter, compressed-air gun used to fire bird carcasses at aircraft components in order to simulate high-speed bird strikes during the aircraft's flight. Jet engines and aircraft windshields are particularly vulnerable to damage from such strikes, and are the most common target in such tests. Although various species of bird are used in aircraft testing and certification, the device acquired the common name of "chicken gun" as chickens are the most commonly used ammunition owing to their ready availability.

== Context ==
Bird strikes are a significant hazard to flight safety, particularly around takeoff and landing where crew workload is highest and there is scant time for recovery before a potential impact with the ground. The speeds involved in a collision between a jet aircraft and a bird can be considerable – often around 350 km/h (220 mph) – resulting in a large transfer of kinetic energy. A bird colliding with an aircraft windshield could penetrate or shatter it, injuring the flight crew or impairing their ability to see. At high altitudes such an event could cause uncontrolled decompression. A bird ingested by a jet engine can break the engine's compressor blades, potentially causing catastrophic damage.

Multiple measures are used to prevent bird strikes, such as the use of deterrent systems at airports to prevent birds from gathering, population control using birds of prey or firearms, and recently avian radar systems that track flocks of birds and give warnings to pilots and air traffic controllers.

Despite this, the risk of bird strikes is impossible to eliminate and therefore most government certification authorities such as the US Federal Aviation Administration and the European Aviation Safety Agency require that aircraft engines and airframes be resilient against bird strikes to a certain degree as part of the airworthiness certification process. In general, an engine should not suffer an uncontained failure (an event where rotating parts are ejected from the engine casing) after impact with a suitably-sized bird, and a bird strike to the airframe of a craft should not prevent "continued safe flight [and a] normal landing".

== History ==
The first recorded chicken gun was built in 1942 by the US Civil Aeronautics Administration in collaboration with the Westinghouse Electric and Manufacturing Company. Built at Westinghouse's High Power Laboratory in Pittsburgh, it was capable of firing bird carcasses at up to 400 miles per hour (640 km/h), although most tests were conducted with muzzle velocities around 270 miles per hour (430 km/h). The gun used compressed air as its propellant, with a compressor storing air into an accumulator until the desired pressure was reached. To fire the gun, an operator triggered the opening of an electric quick-release valve, dumping the compressed air into the barrel. Different muzzle velocities were achieved by varying the pressure stored in the accumulator.

The tests conducted with this gun were the first of their kind, and showed that the glass used in the windshields of common passenger aircraft such as the Douglas DC-3 was extremely vulnerable to bird strikes; panels were penetrated completely by a 4-pound (1.8 kg) bird traveling at only 75 miles per hour (121 km/h). Subsequent testing showed that laminate panels made of glass interleaved with polyvinyl chloride were far more resistant.

The gun was used at the High Power Laboratory until November 1943. In early 1945, it was moved to a CAA research & development location in Indianapolis, called the Indianapolis Experimental Station, where it was used to test components for various commercial aircraft manufacturers, before being retired at some point in 1947. A similar gun was independently developed by the De Havilland Aircraft Company in the United Kingdom in the mid-1950s. The UK's Royal Aircraft Establishment built a chicken gun in 1961, and in 1967 the Canadian National Research Council's Division of Mechanical Engineering used the RAE's design as a basis for their "Flight Impact Simulator Facility", a pneumatic gun based next to Ottawa airport. This gun remained in frequent use until 2016, at which point it was donated to the Canada Aviation and Space Museum and replaced by a pair of more modern guns. The replacements can accommodate different sized birds more easily through the use of a modular barrel. In the 1970s, Goodyear Aerospace developed a chicken gun that stored compressed air behind a ceramic diaphragm and used a cardboard sabot to center and stabilize the chicken. When fired, a needle struck the diaphragm, rupturing the seal and allowing the air to propel the projectile down the barrel. A metal ring on the muzzle stopped the sabot, but allowed the chicken to escape the barrel.

The United States Air Force built the AEDC Ballistic Range S-3 at Arnold Engineering Development Complex in 1972 to test the canopies and windshields of military aircraft. Like previous chicken guns, S-3 used compressed air to launch its projectiles. The gun was later used in the development and certification of multiple US military aircraft, including the F-4, F-111 and A-10. As of 2007 the gun was still in operation.

== Use in aircraft certification ==
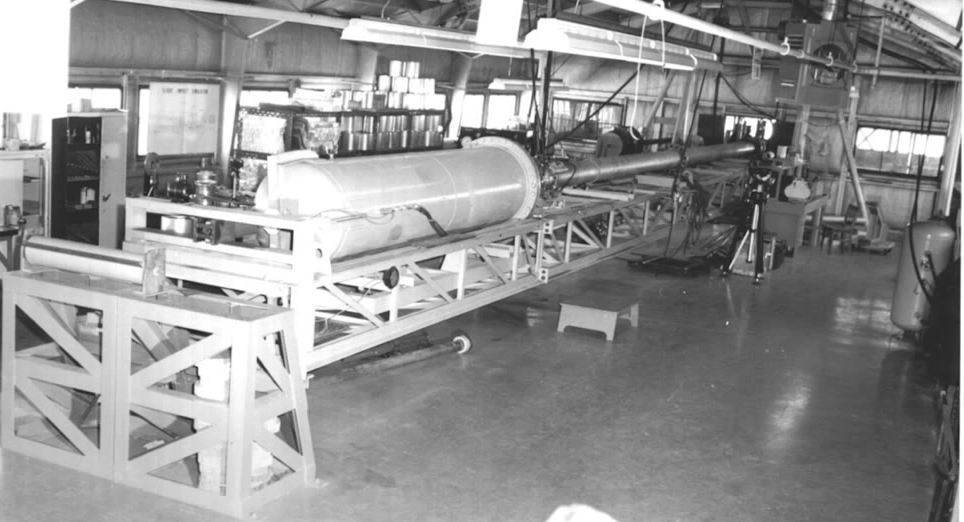
A 10-inch (25 cm) smoothbore chicken gun used by Canadian aerospace firms to test components at the Flight Impact Simulator Facility in Ottawa, photographed here in storage at the Canada Aviation and Space Museum at some point after 2016.

Chicken guns are routinely used in the process of proving compliance with certification regulations. Given their complexity and the expertise required to operate them, an aircraft manufacturer will typically contract with a facility that operates a gun to perform a test against a given standard. The component to be tested is mounted securely on a frame, the gun fires a bird at it, and the results are examined for compliance with the relevant standards. Most tests are performed with the gun pressurized to around 35 psi (2.4 bar) – this results in a four-pound (1.8 kg) bird being launched at around 350 miles per hour (560 km/h), approximately the resultant velocity in a collision between a bird and an aircraft.

The FAA do not specify the species of bird that should be used for testing, but do state that the birds should not be frozen, as this would not accurately reflect the reality of a strike. Chickens are used as they are cheap and readily available.

There have been efforts to develop artificial bird analogs for use in impact tests, to replace the use of carcasses. The motivations for this range from ensuring that results are easily reproducible across the industry, cost, and sensitivity to the views of animal rights activists. However, concerns have been expressed by some engineers that tests with artificial birds do not accurately represent the forces involved in real bird strikes as the analogs lack bones. Some go further and state that the farm-raised birds commonly used in tests are also unrepresentative owing to the lower density of their muscle tissue.

=== Notable uses ===
During the development of the Boeing 757 in the 1970s, the cockpit roof was subjected to a bird strike test wherein a 4-pound (1.8 kg) chicken was fired at 360 knots (410 mph; 670 km/h) into a stationary cockpit. To the surprise of the Boeing engineers, the chicken penetrated the skin of the aircraft. As a result the cockpit of the 757, and that of the 767 which shared the same design, had to be reinforced. Several 767s were already in service, and had to be recalled for retrofitting of the reinforcements. Later in the 757's development process a bird strike test was conducted on the aircraft's windows, again by firing a chicken at them. The UK Civil Aviation Authority's certification requirements at the time were more stringent than the FAA's, and required the metal around the windows to also resist a bird strike. The 757 failed this test, requiring further re-engineering.

After the Space Shuttle Columbia disaster in 2003, the chicken gun at AEDC Ballistic Range S-3 was repurposed to test the resistance of various components of the Shuttle orbiter and launch fuel tanks to impacts from insulating foam. The intent was to discover the exact cause of the disaster, and establish whether any modifications to the Shuttle were required.

== In popular culture ==
The comedy series Royal Canadian Air Farce has a recurring skit in which a "chicken cannon" is used to fire various objects, originally including a rubber chicken, at a picture of a well-known person, often a politician.

== See also ==
- Bird strike
- Blade off testing
- Blue Peacock § Chicken-powered nuclear bomb
