= AEDC Ballistic Range S-3 =

AEDC Ballistic Range S-3 is a single stage air gun owned by the United States Air Force. The gun is commonly used for bird strike testing and is often called a chicken gun.

== History ==
The first Range S-3 was developed by Eugene Sanders at the Arnold Engineering Development Complex for use in aircraft canopy testing. The gun validated many of the canopies designs used on fighter aircraft over the last several decades. The range also played an instrumental role in developing the ASTM F330 specification: Standard Test Method for Bird Impact Testing of Aerospace Transparent Enclosures.

== Capabilities ==
The gun uses a large compressed air reservoir to launch a projectile out of a 7-inch (180 mm) diameter barrel. Launch speeds of 200 to 1,400 ft/s (61 to 427 m/s) can be attained. The barrel can also be reconfigured to launch square or rectangle projectiles. The most commonly used projectile is a dead chicken prepared in accordance with the ASTM specification.

== See also ==
- Arnold Engineering Development Complex
- Ballistics
- NASA Chicken Gun
