= Bird–window collisions =

Problem in urban areas

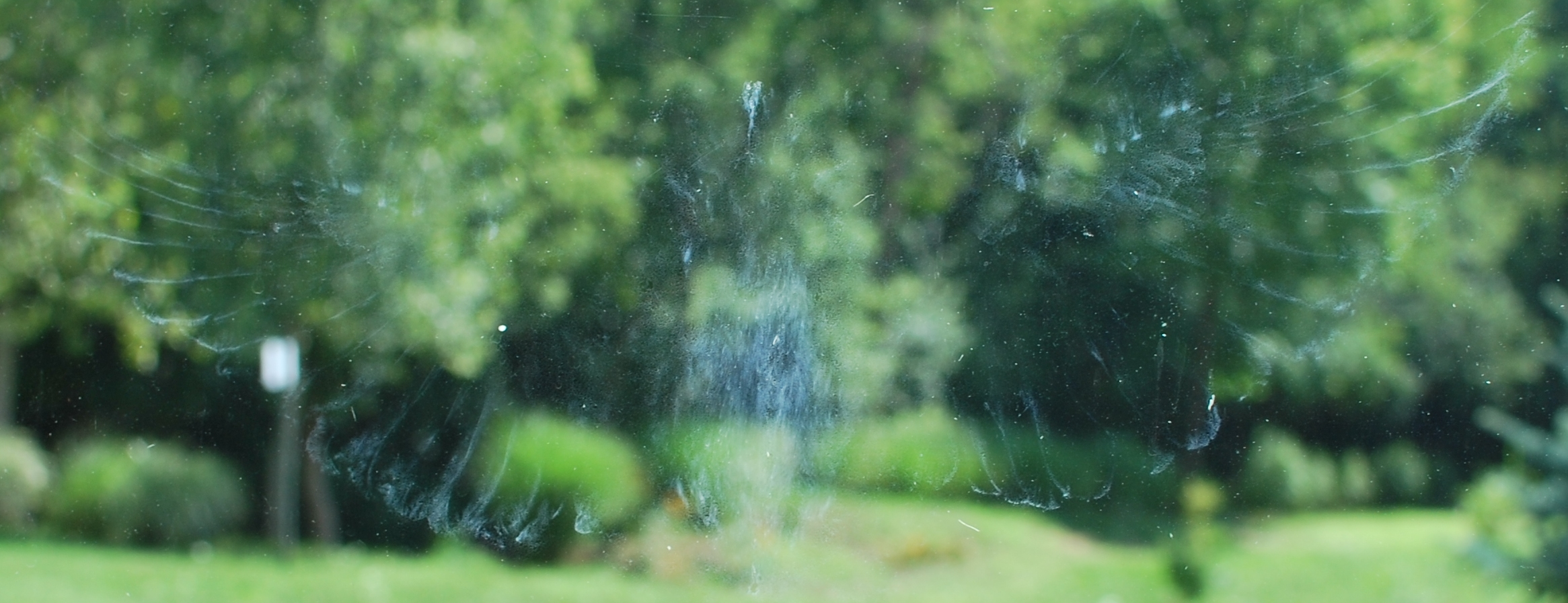
Imprint from where a bird has struck a window

Number of bird-window collisions versus other human-related causes of bird deaths

Bird–window collisions (also known as bird strikes after the aviation term or as window strikes) are a problem in both low- and high-density areas worldwide. Birds strike glass because reflective or transparent glass is often invisible to them. Previous research estimated that between 100 million and 1 billion birds are killed by collisions in the United States annually, but a 2024 study on the survival rate of bird-building collision victims indicates that previous research was vastly underestimating the number of deaths caused by collisions, and in actuality well over 1 billion birds die from collisions in the United States every year. An estimated 16 to 42 million birds are likewise killed each year in Canada.

== Window collision variables ==
The issue of bird-window collisions has become more prevalent as wild habitat is lost. It has intensified as landscaping and exterior glass continue to become more popular. However, due to differences within the taxon, built environments, time of year, and other effects, there is great variation in the nature and frequency of collisions.

=== Susceptible species ===
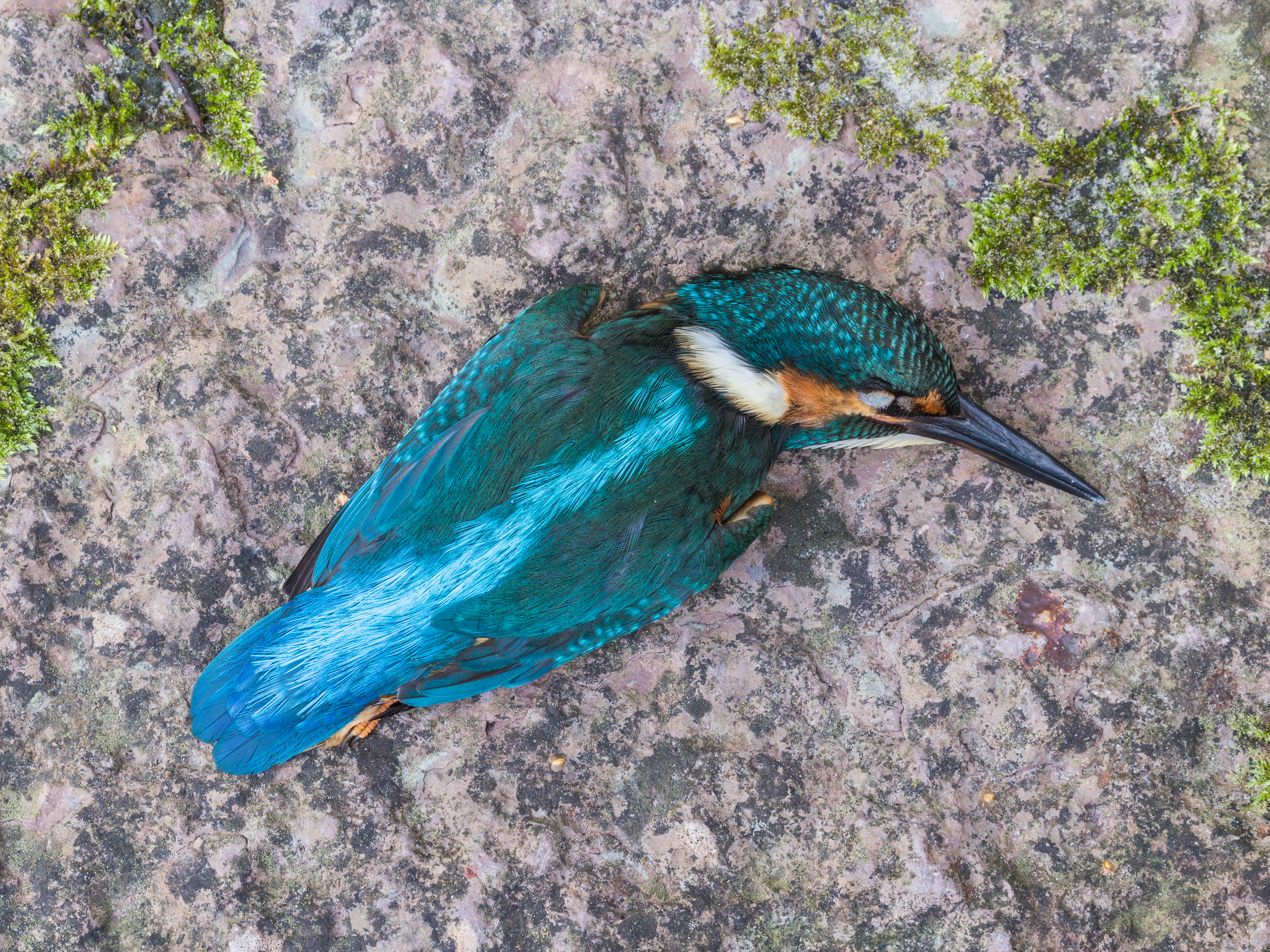
A common kingfisher (Alcedo atthis) that died after flying into a window

Studies analyzing window collisions across greater spatial scales reveal interesting trends in species composition, indicating that some birds are more vulnerable to collisions than others. This most likely depends on differing morphology and physical flight characteristics of birds, but more subtle differences between groups are also thought to contribute to differences in vulnerability. Examples include differences in vision, degree of flocking, flight behaviors, and more specific life history traits, such as provisioning of young.

Species of warblers, thrushes, sparrows, hummingbirds, and vireos are among the most susceptible, with bay-breasted warblers, ovenbirds, red-eyed vireos, and blackpoll warblers being the most notable. The reason for these species' vulnerability is not well understood, but it is speculated that species-specific behaviors are a likely contributor, as other factors like flight altitude differ greatly between these groups. Many of these birds have been documented as being especially attracted to lit structures. Warblers, thrushes, and vireos are known to make quick flight movements through densely vegetated areas, and are thought to be heavily guided by light in flight, which could account for this susceptibility to light disruption. Further, some of these species, such as thrushes and ovenbirds, spend more time near the ground, which is another characteristic shared among many common window-strike victims. Species like cedar waxwings, which make up a disproportionately high amount of window collisions in the fall and winter, are thought to be susceptible due to their flocking behaviors. During these months, waxwings forage in large flocks to more efficiently search for berries. It is thought that this seasonal increase in collisions is due to their increased concentration of movement, and perhaps because flocking birds are less attentive to their surroundings, opting to follow the lead bird in the flock.

There are also patterns of species mortality across different building types, which are most likely due to differences in flight behavior. For instance, golden-winged warblers and Canada warblers are most at risk at low-rises and high-rises, painted buntings at low-rises, worm-eating warblers at high-rises and wood thrushes at residences.

It has been observed that many species which are very high in abundance in urban areas, such as house sparrows, are killed at relatively low rates, further indicating that species mortality is not dependent on density.

=== Building properties ===
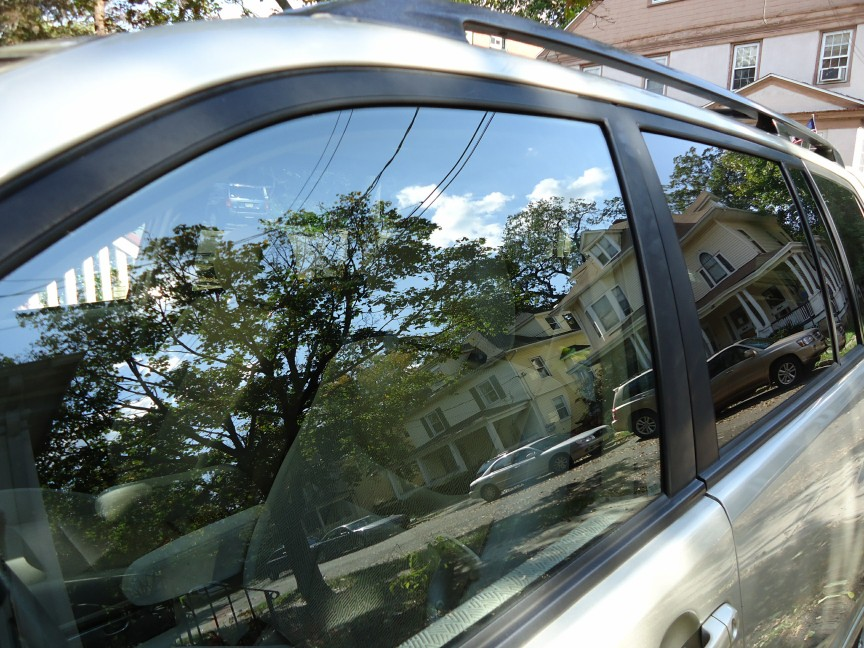
Nearby vegetation reflected in glass

The number of observed bird fatalities caused by any given building varies greatly across a spatial scale. There is a positive correlation between the number of collisions which occur at a building and the amount of the building surface area which is covered with windows. This is heavily evidenced by high levels of mortality at large commercial buildings. Further, buildings located in more developed areas experience fewer collisions than those in less-developed areas, due to effects of proximity to forested patches. This is most noticeable in residences across a rural-urban gradient, where per-building mortality rates are higher in rural areas. However, despite causing the lowest total mortality, more recent studies reveal that high-rise buildings have the highest median annual mortality rates.

The presence and height of vegetation surrounding a building is also positively correlated with bird mortalities. This is because highly reflective windows create an illusion of vegetation that birds can fly into, and birds are unable to recognize the cues of a window the way that humans do. A study conducted in Manhattan found support for the hypothesis that most collisions occur during daytime hours, when birds are foraging for food, due to the high number of collisions that occurred at windowed exteriors incorporating vegetation.

Building layout, orientation, and spacing within a city is another a contributing factor to bird-window collisions, as topographical features that channel or concentrate bird movements are often seen within urban planning. Structures are at a greater risk of causing bird fatalities when located near areas that support high densities of birds. Urban greenspaces are one example, used by many species of songbird for foraging, breeding, or as migratory stopover sites. Channeling effects may also be seen at a fine scale, when architectural corridors guide bird flight paths into areas of increased collision risk.

In fact, buildings within a 50 to 100 meter distance from these natural areas are significantly more likely to have bird-window collisions. When these buildings are placed directly next to these areas, they overlap with birds natural flight patterns. During dusk and dawn, when many birds are most active and visibility is lower, birds fly at lower altitudes to find these green spaces more effectively. Reflective windows near these areas mirror surrounding trees, sky, and water, making the building appear invisible. This combination of proximity, flying at low-altitude, and reflective glass creates a high-risk zone where collisions are far more likely to occur.

=== Seasonality ===
Collisions appear to happen less frequently during the winter and more frequently during peak migration periods, though seasonal patterns of mortality are difficult to detect due to limited availability of studies that survey collisions throughout the year. However, it is generally understood that there are increases in bird collisions during fall and spring migrations due to greater movement in bird populations, and because birds are less familiar with the landscape along their migratory routes. Additionally, fatalities in fall migration are consistently greater than in spring migration, which is likely due to a larger proportion of young, relatively inexperienced birds.

=== Light emissions ===
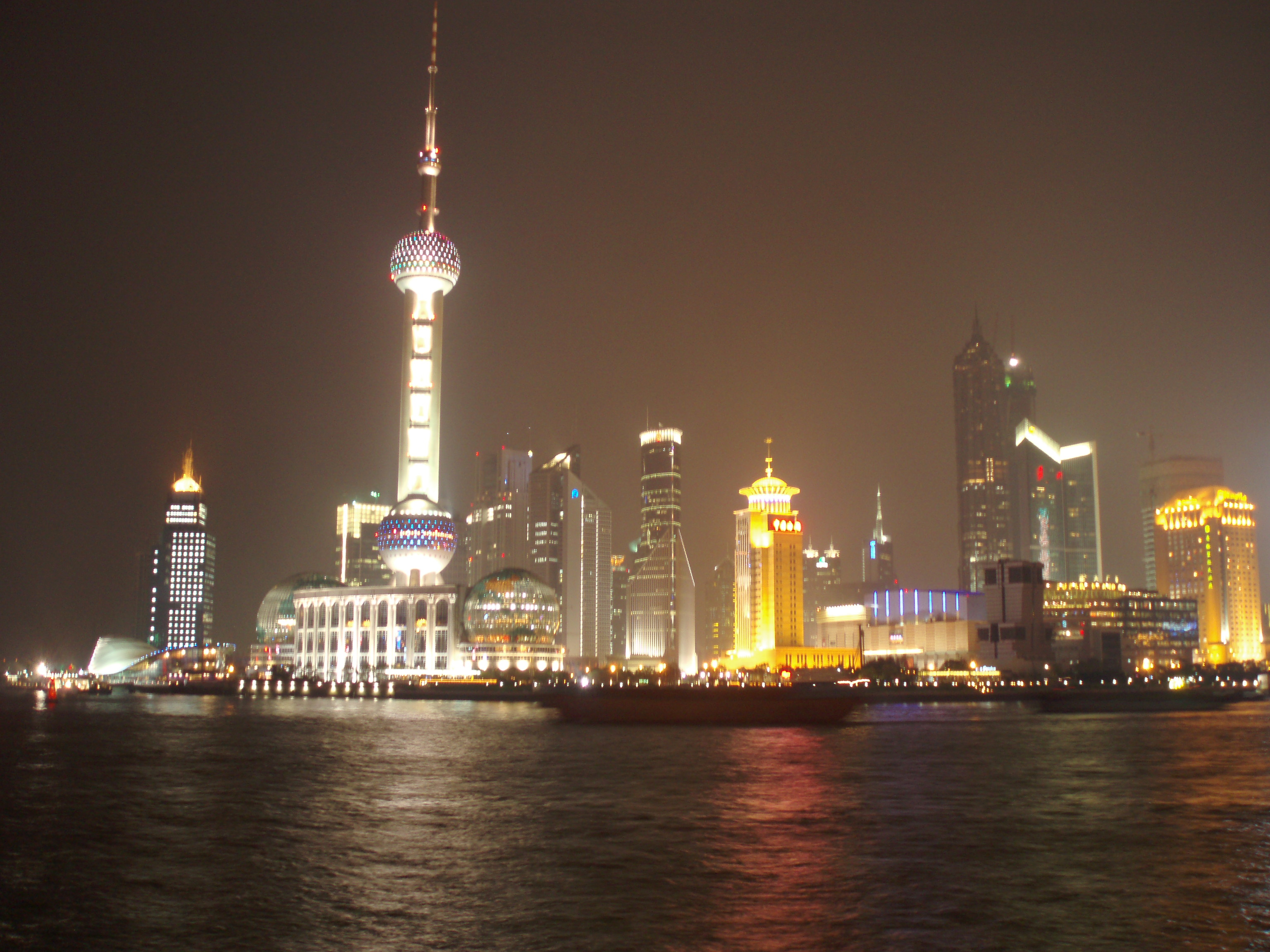
Haze created by light pollution in the urban center of Pudong; Shanghai

Bird mortality rates increase with the amount of light that is emitted from a given building and bird species that migrate at night are particularly vulnerable to collisions, which is thought to be attributed to fatal entrapment by light-emitting structures. While there are various explanations for why nocturnally migrating birds are attracted to artificial lights, it is known that birds rely on a variety of cues for migration, with the orientation of the stars being a major reference for nocturnal migrants. It is therefore speculated that these artificially illuminated areas conceal the visual navigation cues that these birds rely on, resulting in them becoming disoriented. This hypothesis has been well supported by several observations of birds being attracted to and disoriented by lights, particularly in conditions of poor-visibility, which makes them more susceptible to colliding with buildings.

In addition, birds may also be impacted by bright lights at nights as they have extra-retinal photoreceptors that are disoriented by the reflection of light from these buildings. Mitigating the amount of light emitted from glass surfaces at night, such as windows, can reduce the amount of fatal bird collisions with buildings and structures.

=== Weather conditions ===
Weather conditions influence bird flight behavior in ways that make them more or less susceptible to collisions. Conditions which reduce visibility, such as fog, rain, or snow, can disorient birds, especially those that migrate at night and rely on visual cues. Low wind speeds can also result in poor lift for larger, soaring raptors, which can lead to collisions with skyscrapers. Other factors, including humidity and air temperature, can also influence flight altitudes of birds in ways that influence risk of collision. Some of the highest reports of bird fatalities from window collisions have occurred when migrating passerines began their journey in good weather conditions, but hit a cold front which forced them to lower altitudes.

== Solutions ==
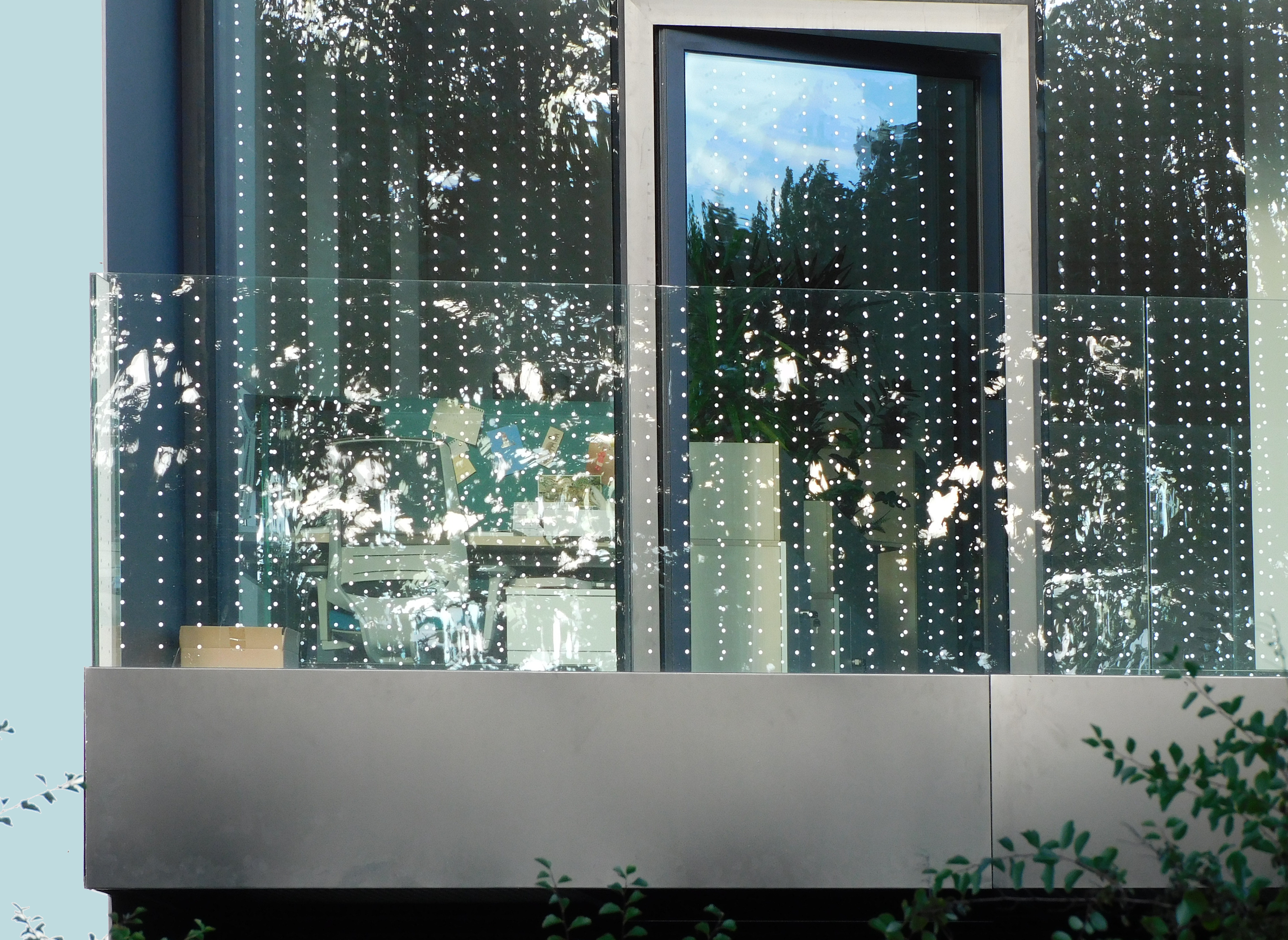
Windows fitted with a dotted grid pattern to prevent bird collisions

There are several methods of preventing bird-window strikes. The use of ultraviolet (UV) signals to make windows appear visible to birds, while once one of the most common means of combatting this issue, is no longer recommended by experts. This is because while some birds can see UV light, not all can. Other solutions include window film (as long as it is placed on the exterior of the glass) and ceramic frit glass (glass with frit dots). Windows can also be covered with decals spaced no more than 5 cm horizontally or 10 cm vertically to prevent collisions. It has been found that silhouettes of predatory birds posted on windows do not significantly decrease collision rates. This is because there is too much exposed glass, which the bird can try to fly through. Treatments placed on the inside of windows are not effective either, because they typically do not diminish the glare or reflection.

One notable attempt at making windows safer for birds is at McCormick Place's Lakeside Center in Chicago. A large convention center with 120,000 square feet (2.8 acres) of exterior windows, the building had for years been the site of numerous bird deaths resulting from window collisions, with hundreds dying each fall and spring migration season despite several attempts at mitigation. Following the deaths of nearly 1,000 birds there on a single night in the fall of 2023, a new plan was developed to make the building's windows more visible to birds. Implemented in the summer of 2024, it involved applying small white dots in a 2-inch (5 cm) grid pattern to the surfaces of all its windows. Since the project's completion, the number of bird deaths at the site has fallen by about 95% compared with migrations prior to the change.

In some sports facilities such as paddle courts, adhesive vinyl decals have been used on glass walls to reduce bird collisions. These decals act as visible markers that help birds recognize transparent barriers and avoid impact.

== Monitoring and legislation ==
Many bird collision prevention organizations have come about in recent years. Examples include Chicago Bird Collision Monitors, Toronto's Fatal Light Awareness Program (FLAP), and New York City Audubon's Project Safe Flight, which all have documented thousands of bird collisions due to human-made structures. Monitoring programs such as these are becoming more and more common at a local level, and rely heavily on participation from volunteer groups.

In 2024, several of these organizations, along with many other conservation groups like The Cornell Lab of Ornithology and the American Bird Conservancy, came together and formed The Bird Collision Prevention Alliance. According to their website, members of the alliance "work together to promote innovative glass treatments, responsible lighting practices, and collaborative action" with the goal of being able to "dramatically reduce bird fatalities and create a world where wildlife and human spaces coexist harmoniously". The BCPA's website also provides information on various ways people can help prevent bird deaths from window strikes — by purchasing and installing bird-safe window treatments, using stencils and paint to create DIY window treatments, turning off or altering artificial lights at night, and advocating for bird-friendly legislation and architectural policies.

Further, governments of Canada and the United States have recently introduced legislation to make new and existing buildings bird friendly. Examples include Toronto's "Bird-Friendly Development Guidelines", Chicago's "Design Guide for Bird-Safe Buildings: New Construction and Renovation", and Evanston's "Bird-Friendly Building Design Guide". On the federal level, the Federal Bird-Safe Buildings Act of 2011 calls for each public building constructed, acquired, or altered by the General Services Administration (GSA) to incorporate bird-safe building materials and design features. The legislation would require GSA to take similar actions on existing buildings, where practicable.

In New York City, where an estimated 230,000 birds collide with buildings each year, New York's Bird-Friendly Buildings Act required new and existing buildings be bird-friendly effective Jan 1, 2012. In December 2019, a bill passed mandating that the lowest 75 feet (23 m) of new buildings, and structures above a green roof, must use materials such as patterned glass which are visible to flying birds. Compliance with these new standards will also be required for building renovations beginning in December 2020.

== See also ==
- Bird strike with cars or planes
- Ecological light pollution
- Skyglow
- Towerkill with antenna towers and masts
