= List of Mayday episodes =

Mayday, known as Air Crash Investigation(s) outside of the United States and Canada and also known as Mayday: Air Disaster (The Weather Channel) or Air Disasters (Smithsonian Channel) in the United States, is a Canadian documentary television series produced by Cineflix that recounts air crashes, near-crashes, fires, hijackings, bombings, and other mainly flight-related disasters and crises. It reveals the events that led to each crisis or disaster, their causes as determined by the official investigating body or bodies, and the measures they recommended to prevent a similar incident from happening again. The programs use re-enactments, interviews, eyewitness testimony, computer-generated imagery, cockpit voice recordings, and official reports to reconstruct the sequences of events.

As of 2 June 2026, 297 episodes of Mayday have aired. (Note: This does not include "Crash of the Century", a 2005 90-minute special investigating the Tenerife airport disaster, as the program is not branded as Mayday by Cineflix, even though the program was produced similarly to Mayday.) This includes five Science of Disaster specials, each examining multiple crashes with similar causes. For broadcasters that do not use the series name Mayday, three Season 3 episodes were labelled as Crash Scene Investigation spin-offs, examining marine or rail disasters.

A sub-series labelled The Accident Files began airing in 2018 and, as of 2024, has aired six seasons. The first five seasons consisted of ten episodes per series and the sixth season consisted of six episodes. This sub-series consists entirely of summarized versions of air disasters previously investigated in the primary Mayday series, but combined based on similarities between the incidents, such as fires or pilot error. Each episode covers three accidents and 15 minutes is dedicated to each of the disasters that are covered.

== Series overview ==
Seasons	Episodes	Originally released	
Seasons	Episodes	First released	Last released
1	6	3 September 2003	22 October 2003
2	6	23 January 2005	27 February 2005
3	13	14 September 2005	7 December 2005
4	10	15 April 2007	17 June 2007
5	10	9 April 2008	11 June 2008
6	3	16 December 2007	2 March 2008
7	8	4 November 2009	17 December 2009
8	2	10 June 2009	17 June 2009
9	8	8 September 2010	27 October 2010
10	6	27 February 2011	28 March 2011
11	13	12 August 2011	13 April 2012
12	13	3 August 2012	15 April 2013
13	11	16 December 2013	9 May 2014
14	11	5 January 2015	2 March 2015
15	10	4 January 2016	17 February 2016
16	10	7 June 2016	13 February 2017
17	10	20 February 2017	3 October 2017
18	10	13 February 2018	4 July 2018
19	10	2 January 2019	11 March 2019
20	10	9 January 2020	12 March 2020
21	10	4 April 2021	6 June 2021
22	10	3 January 2022	12 February 2022
23	10	3 January 2023	7 March 2023
24	10	11 February 2024	14 April 2024
25	11	2 February 2025	26 May 2025
26	10	20 January 2026	24 March 2026

== Episodes ==
Note: Episodes are ordered by their production number, not by their original air date.

=== Season 1 (2003) ===
No. overall	No. in series	Title	Incident	Original release date
1	1	"Unlocking Disaster"	United Airlines Flight 811	10 September 2003
On 24 February 1989, part of the right-side fuselage of United Airlines Flight 811 rips off, ejecting nine people from the aircraft and causing an explosive decompression. The flight later lands safely at Honolulu without any more loss of life. It was later determined that an electrical short circuit caused the cargo door to open. Note: This accident is covered again in the Season 24 episode 'Terror Over The Pacific' (S24E01). Type of aircraft: Boeing 747-100
2	2	"Racing the Storm"	American Airlines Flight 1420	3 September 2003
On 1 June 1999, American Airlines Flight 1420 tries to land at the Little Rock National Airport during a storm, but overruns the runway, killing 11 people. The crash was caused by the crew not arming the spoilers during their pre-landing checks. Note: Stephen Bogaert, the narrator for the Canadian version, also played First Officer Origel. Type of aircraft: McDonnell Douglas MD-82
3	3	"Fire on Board"	Swissair Flight 111	22 October 2003
On 2 September 1998, a fire breaks out on Swissair Flight 111 while in flight, damaging vital systems and causing the aircraft to crash into the Atlantic Ocean off Peggys Cove, Nova Scotia, with no survivors of the 229 people on board. The fire was caused by faulty wiring in the on-board first-class and business-class entertainment systems. Type of aircraft: McDonnell Douglas MD-11
4	4	"Flying Blind"	Aeroperú Flight 603	17 September 2003
On 2 October 1996, shortly after take off, the crew of Aeroperú Flight 603 are confused by false speed and altitude readings and contradictory warnings from the aircraft's air data system. In preparation for an emergency landing, the crew descend the aircraft, but unknowingly descend too far by relying on the false readings. The Boeing 757 crashes into the Pacific Ocean, killing all 70 on board. The false readings and contradictory warnings were caused by duct tape over the static ports, which was used to protect the ports during maintenance, but was not removed afterwards. Note: This crash is covered again in the Season 26 episode 'Deadly Cover Up' (S26E06). Type of aircraft: Boeing 757-200
5	5	"Cutting Corners"	Alaska Airlines Flight 261	15 October 2003
On 31 January 2000, Alaska Airlines Flight 261's trimmable horizontal stabilizer jams and breaks from its control system. The aircraft dives inverted into the Pacific Ocean, killing all 88 on board. The stabilizer failed due to an improperly maintained jackscrew assembly. Note: This crash is covered again in the Season 22 episode 'Pacific Plunge' (S22E05). Type of aircraft: McDonnell Douglas MD-83
6	6	"Flying on Empty"	Air Transat Flight 236	8 October 2003
On 24 August 2001, Air Transat Flight 236 runs out of fuel while flying over the Atlantic Ocean. The pilots glide the aircraft to a safe landing at a naval base in the Azores. Improper maintenance work allowed a hydraulic line and a fuel line to rub together, resulting in a subsequent fuel line fracture and a leak. Type of aircraft: Airbus A330-200

=== Season 2 (2005) ===
No. overall	No. in series	Title	Incident	Original release date
7	1	"Blow Out"	British Airways Flight 5390	23 January 2005
On 10 June 1990, a cockpit window on British Airways Flight 5390 blows out, partially ejecting and injuring the captain through the hole. A flight attendant clings onto his legs as the first officer completes an emergency landing without any deaths. The captain is found to be still alive after being outside the cockpit for 21 minutes. The blowout was caused by a maintenance worker installing incorrectly sized bolts during maintenance work. Type of aircraft: BAC 1-11 528FL
8	2	"A Wounded Bird"	Atlantic Southeast Airlines Flight 529	30 January 2005
On 21 August 1995, a blade on the left-side propeller of Atlantic Southeast Airlines Flight 529 breaks off. The imbalance of the rotating propeller causes the engine to partly tear itself from its mounting, creating excessive drag. The aircraft rapidly loses altitude and crashes, killing nine people. Chlorine deposits in the blade led to the development of corrosion pits and fatigue cracks, causing it to weaken and break. Type of aircraft: Embraer EMB 120 Brasilia
9	3	"The Killing Machine"	Air France Flight 8969	6 February 2005
On 24 December 1994, Air France Flight 8969 is hijacked on the ground at Algiers Airport. The four terrorists demand the aircraft be allowed to depart for Paris so they can blow up the aircraft over the Eiffel Tower, but the Algerian Army blocks the aircraft with vehicles and refuse to allow it to take off. Unable to carry out their plans, the terrorists kill three passengers over the next two days. The aircraft is then cleared to take off, but the crew diverts to Marseille Provence Airport. The hostage rescue team of the French Gendarmerie storms the aircraft, and after a gun battle in the cabin, the hijackers are killed and everyone else is evacuated. Type of aircraft: Airbus A300B2
10	4	"Deadly Crossroads"	2002 Überlingen mid-air collision	13 February 2005
On 1 July 2002, BAL Bashkirian Airlines Flight 2937 collides with DHL International Aviation ME Flight 611 in German airspace near Überlingen, killing all 71 people on board the two aircraft. The crew of Flight 611 followed the on-board traffic collision avoidance system (TCAS) instructions to initiate a descent. However, the crew of Flight 2937 followed the instructions of the air traffic controller instead of their TCAS and initiated a descent as well. Only one air traffic controller was on duty (covering two boards) for that block of airspace at the time of the collision—his co-worker was on his coffee break. Note: This crash is covered again in the Season 25 episode 'Collision Catastrophe' (S25E09). Type of aircraft: Flight 2937: Tupolev Tu-154M; Flight 611: Boeing 757-200PF
11	5	"Lost"	American Airlines Flight 965	20 February 2005
On 20 December 1995, American Airlines Flight 965 is en route to Cali, Colombia. The crew are asked if they would like to perform a straight-in approach to Cali. The pilots accept the offer, but as they are making the necessary changes, they inadvertently delete the waypoints from the flight plan in their flight management system, causing them to lose certainty of their exact position. Their mistakes cause the aircraft to fly into a mountain near Buga. Only four passengers and a dog survive. Type of aircraft: Boeing 757-200
12	6	"Missing over New York"	Avianca Flight 052	27 February 2005
On 25 January 1990, Avianca Flight 052 is delayed numerous times by bad weather en route and is dangerously low on fuel as it attempts a landing at New York City. Wind shear forces the crew to abort the approach just one mile from the runway. They initiate a go-around, but are directed back into a holding pattern by air traffic controllers who are unaware of the low fuel situation. The Boeing 707 then runs out of fuel, causing it to crash on Long Island. Type of aircraft: Boeing 707-320B

=== Season 3 (2005) ===
Note: This is the first season produced in high definition.

No. overall	No. in series	Title	Incident	Original release date
13	1	"Hanging by a Thread"	Aloha Airlines Flight 243	14 September 2005
On 28 April 1988, the upper half of the front fuselage of Aloha Airlines Flight 243 tears off, blowing out a flight attendant. The aircraft subsequently lands safely at Kahului, Hawaii. The fuselage failed from corrosion damage and improperly-repaired fatigue cracks. Type of aircraft: Boeing 737-200
14	2	"Attack over Baghdad"	2003 Baghdad DHL attempted shootdown incident	21 September 2005
On 22 November 2003, a 9K34 Strela-3 man-portable air-defense system is launched at a DHL Airbus A300. The missile strikes the left wing at a critical location where all three hydraulic lines flow: this causes a massive loss of hydraulic fluid and immobilizes the flight control surfaces. The crew flies the aircraft by changing the engines' thrust for control and make a safe landing 16 minutes later. Type of aircraft: Airbus A300B4-200F
15	3	"Out of Control"	Japan Air Lines Flight 123	28 September 2005
On 12 August 1985, the aft pressure bulkhead bursts on a Boeing 747SR operating as Japan Airlines Flight 123, destroying the vertical stabilizer and severing all four of the aircraft's hydraulic systems. The crew keep the aircraft flying for 32 minutes until it clips Mount Takamagahara and crashes, killing all but four of the 524 people on board. The accident was caused by a faulty repair to the bulkhead after a much-earlier tailstrike incident. Note: This crash is covered again in the Season 23 episode 'Pressure Point' (S23E03). Type of aircraft: Boeing 747SR
16	4	"Fight for Your Life"	Federal Express Flight 705	5 October 2005
On 7 April 1994, Auburn Calloway, a disgruntled employee, attempts to hijack Federal Express Flight 705 armed with hammers and a speargun. Despite sustaining serious injuries from Calloway's assault, the crew successfully subdues him with a combination of their own strength and using the DC-10 to carry out multiple aerial manoeuvres, and returns the aircraft safely to Memphis International Airport. Type of aircraft: McDonnell Douglas DC-10-30F
17	5	"Bomb on Board"	Philippine Airlines Flight 434	12 October 2005
On 11 December 1994, a bomb explodes on Philippine Airlines Flight 434 on the second leg of a service from Manila to Tokyo via Cebu City, killing a passenger, injuring many people and damaging some of the aircraft's control systems. The crew successfully lands the aircraft at Naha Airport in Okinawa. Subsequent investigation determined that Ramzi Yousef, a terrorist, smuggled the bomb aboard the aircraft on the first leg of its flight. Type of aircraft: Boeing 747-200B
18	6	"Mistaken Identity"	Iran Air Flight 655	19 October 2005
On 3 July 1988, during the Iran–Iraq War, the USS Vincennes launches missiles which bring down Iran Air Flight 655, killing all 290 people on board. The crew of the Vincennes claimed that they mistook the airliner for an Iranian Air Force Grumman F-14 Tomcat fighter, but Iran believes that the U.S. deliberately shot it down. Type of aircraft: Airbus A300B2-200
19	7	"Helicopter Down"	Bristow Helicopters Flight 56C	26 October 2005
On 19 January 1995, lightning damages the tail rotor of Bristow Helicopters Flight 56C, forcing the crew to perform an emergency autorotation to a ditching in the sea. Despite the rough sea conditions, the 16 oil rig workers and 2 pilots are rescued by a nearby ship. Type of aircraft: Eurocopter AS332 Super Puma
20	8	"Death and Denial"	EgyptAir Flight 990	2 November 2005
On 31 October 1999, EgyptAir Flight 990 crashes into the Atlantic Ocean while flying from New York City to Cairo, killing all 217 people on board. The cause of the crash is disputed: the Egyptian government claims that the crash was caused by a mechanical failure with the elevators, but the U.S. government claims the aircraft was deliberately crashed by the Relief First Officer Gameel Al-Batouti. Type of aircraft: Boeing 767-300ER
21	9	"Runaway Train"	San Bernardino train disaster (SP 7551 East)	30 November 2005
On 12 May 1989, a 69-car freight train goes out of control while descending from California's Cajon Pass. It derails in a residential neighbourhood of San Bernardino after reaching speeds in excess of 100 miles per hour (160 km/h). Two residents and two train crew members are killed in the initial crash. More than a week later, an underground gasoline pipeline, damaged by earth-moving equipment during the post-crash clean-up, ruptures and sparks a fire that kills another two people. Clerks in Mojave had greatly underestimated the train's weight, and it had been assembled without enough locomotives to provide adequate braking. Additionally, several of the engines' brakes were completely inoperative, but this information was not passed on to the crews. Note: This episode is labeled as a Crash Scene Investigation spin-off. Type of train: Southern Pacific freight train (EMD SD40T-2 and EMD SD45T-2 locomotives): sixty-nine freight cars pulled by six locomotives
22	10	"Kid in the Cockpit"	Aeroflot Flight 593	9 November 2005
On 23 March 1994, Aeroflot Flight 593 stalls and crashes while en route to British Hong Kong, killing all 75 people on board. The pilot's 15-year-old son accidentally disabled the autopilot while in the captain's seat, causing the aircraft to bank heavily to the right and inducing the stall. Type of aircraft: Airbus A310-300
23	11	"Collision Course"	MS Express Samina sinking	23 November 2005
On 26 September 2000, waves push the MS Express Samina off course, causing it to hit a group of rocks off Paros and sink, killing 80 people. The subsequent investigation showed that the ferry was on autopilot, with the crew not monitoring the ship's course. They were instead watching a soccer match. Note: This episode is labeled as a Crash Scene Investigation spin-off. Type of ship: Passenger ferry (MS Express Samina)
24	12	"Head On Collision"	Hinton train collision	16 November 2005
On 8 February 1986, a Via Rail passenger train and a 118-car Canadian National Railway freight train collide after the freight train crew fail to stop at a red railway signal on a section of a passing loop, killing 23 people. An inquiry concluded that a "railroader culture", which prized loyalty and productivity at the expense of safety, had resulted in a tired and sick crew of three, including an engineer at extreme risk of a stroke or heart attack, to either fall asleep or be otherwise incapacitated, failing to stop the freight train. Note: This episode is labeled as a Crash Scene Investigation spin-off. Type of train: Via Rail passenger train (FP9A and F9B locomotives); 118-car Canadian National freight train (one EMD GP38-2 and two EMD SD40 locomotives)
25	13	"Ocean Landing"	Ethiopian Airlines Flight 961	7 December 2005
On 23 November 1996, Ethiopian Airlines Flight 961 is forced to ditch after running out of fuel. The aircraft breaks up as the wings hit the water, killing 125 people. The aircraft had been hijacked and ran out of fuel because the hijackers did not believe the pilot's insistence that there was not enough fuel aboard to make it to the hijackers' planned destination, Australia. Type of aircraft: Boeing 767-200ER

=== Season 4 (2007) ===
This season saw a change to the overall format of the episodes. In previous seasons, all episodes used a documentary-led format, where facts about the accident were known from the start: the episodes were now presented from the perspective of the crew and passengers initially, and the cause of an accident was revealed towards the end. This format is now the only way that the episodes are produced.

No. overall	No. in series	Title	Incident	Original release date
26	1	"Desperate Escape"	Air France Flight 358	15 April 2007
On 2 August 2005, Air France Flight 358 overruns the runway, travels through the airport perimeter fence and plunges down a small ravine while attempting to land in a storm. All 309 passengers and crew survive. The causes of the crash were the aircraft deviating above the required approach path for its landing, touching down too far along the runway and the crew deploying the thrust reversers too slowly. Type of aircraft: Airbus A340-300
27	2	"Falling from the Sky"	British Airways Flight 009	22 April 2007
On 24 June 1982, British Airways Flight 009 experiences St. Elmo's fire en route from Kuala Lumpur, Malaysia, to Perth, Australia. A few minutes later, all four engines flame out. After descending, the crew successfully restarts the engines and lands safely. The St. Elmo's fire and engine flame-outs were caused by volcanic ash spewed by Galunggung in Indonesia during a major eruption. Type of aircraft: Boeing 747-200B
28	3	"Fire Fight"	Air Canada Flight 797	29 April 2007
On 2 June 1983, a fire breaks out on Air Canada Flight 797's toilet. An emergency landing is made in Cincinnati, but the aircraft is engulfed by flames on the runway due to a flashover caused by the opening of the aircraft's doors after the landing, killing 23 people, including musician Stan Rogers. The origin of the fire could not be determined as a result of the flashover. Type of aircraft: McDonnell Douglas DC-9-32
29	4	"Final Approach"	Korean Air Flight 801	6 May 2007
On 6 August 1997, during final approach for a night landing in Guam, Korean Air Flight 801 crashes into a hill while attempting a missed approach, killing 228 people. The causes were pilot error and the instrument landing system at Guam airport being temporarily out of service for maintenance work. Type of aircraft: Boeing 747-300
30	5	"Hidden Danger"	United Airlines Flight 585, USAir Flight 427, and Eastwind Airlines Flight 517	13 May 2007
On 3 March 1991, a Boeing 737 operating as United Airlines Flight 585 suddenly rolls into a dive and crashes within eight seconds, killing all 25 people on board. On 8 September 1994, USAir Flight 427 also rolls and crashes within thirty seconds, killing all 132 people on board. On 9 June 1996, Eastwind Airlines Flight 517 also rolls unexpectedly in similar circumstances, but the crew successfully regains control of the aircraft and lands safely. The cause of all three incidents was a design flaw with the rudder's control system which allowed the rudder to suddenly and unexpectedly go to full deflection and jam due to thermal shock of the hydraulic control valve. Type of aircraft: Flight 585: Boeing 737-200; Flight 427: Boeing 737-300; Flight 517: Boeing 737-200
31	6	"Panic over the Pacific"	China Airlines Flight 006	20 May 2007
On 19 February 1985, China Airlines Flight 006's number four (right-side outer) engine flames out. As the crew tries to restart the engine, the Boeing 747SP enters a dive. The crew successfully regains control, restarts the engine and lands safely at San Francisco International Airport. The incident was caused by pilot error. Type of aircraft: Boeing 747SP
32	7	"Out of Sight"	Aeroméxico Flight 498	27 May 2007
On 31 August 1986, Aeroméxico Flight 498 collides with a light aircraft over Cerritos, California, causing both to go out of control and crash, killing all 67 people on both aircraft and 15 people on the ground. The accident was caused by neither pilot making visual contact with the other aircraft and a lack of automated collision warning systems. The crash inspires the creation of the traffic collision avoidance system. Type of aircraft: Flight 498: McDonnell Douglas DC-9-32; light aircraft: Piper PA-28-181 Archer
33	8	"Fog of War"	1996 United States Air Force Boeing T-43 crash	3 June 2007
On 3 April 1996, United States Air Force Flight 21 veers off course and flies into a mountain while attempting to land at Dubrovnik Airport in Croatia in heavy fog, killing all 35 people on board, including the U.S. Commerce Secretary Ron Brown. The non-precision approach procedure the crew needed to follow required the use of two automatic direction finders, but the aircraft was only fitted with one. Type of aircraft: Boeing CT-43
34	9	"Vertigo"	Flash Airlines Flight 604	10 June 2007
On 3 January 2004, Flash Airlines Flight 604 banks to the right just after takeoff and crashes into the Red Sea, killing all 148 people on board. The cause of this disaster is disputed, but suggested to be spatial disorientation on the part of the flight crew. Type of aircraft: Boeing 737-300
35	10	"Ghost Plane"	Helios Airways Flight 522	17 June 2007
On 14 August 2005, air traffic controllers lose radio contact with Helios Airways Flight 522. Two fighters from the Hellenic Air Force intercept and investigate the flight and find all but one person on board not moving. A few moments later, the aircraft runs out of fuel and crashes, killing all 121 people on board. An incorrect cabin pressurization setting had caused everyone on board to succumb to hypoxia. Type of aircraft: Boeing 737-300

=== Season 5 (2008) ===
No. overall	No. in series	Title	Incident	Original release date
36	1	"Invisible Killer"	Delta Air Lines Flight 191	7 May 2008
On 2 August 1985, Delta Air Lines Flight 191 crash-lands while on approach to Dallas Fort Worth International Airport, killing 8 of the 11 crew members, 128 of the 152 passengers on board, and one person on the ground. This accident was one of the few commercial air crashes in which the meteorological phenomenon known as a microburst was a direct contributing factor. Type of aircraft: Lockheed L-1011-1 Tristar
37	2	"Gimli Glider"	Air Canada Flight 143	14 May 2008
On 23 July 1983, Air Canada Flight 143 runs out of fuel at 41,000 feet (12,500m) altitude, about halfway through its flight from Montreal to Edmonton. The crew is able to glide the aircraft safely to an emergency landing at Gimli Industrial Park Airport, a former airbase at Gimli, Manitoba. An unserviceable fuel gauge and an error in converting between metric and imperial units caused the aircraft to be loaded with insufficient fuel prior to the flight. Type of aircraft: Boeing 767-200
38	3	"Behind Closed Doors"	American Airlines Flight 96 and Turkish Airlines Flight 981	16 April 2008
On 12 June 1972, a McDonnell Douglas DC-10 operating as American Airlines Flight 96 suffers an explosive decompression after a cargo door in the lower rear fuselage bursts open. The crew makes an emergency landing at Detroit without any loss of life. Nearly two years later, on 3 March 1974, Turkish Airlines Flight 981 crashes near Senlis after suffering a similar sequence of events during a flight from Paris to London, killing all 346 people on board. A design flaw with the DC-10's cargo door locking mechanism was not rectified after the first accident, and the second DC-10's door opened during flight, causing the crash. Type of aircraft: McDonnell Douglas DC-10-10 (both aircraft)
39	4	"Fanning the Flames"	South African Airways Flight 295	21 May 2008
On 28 November 1987, a fire breaks out on South African Airways Flight 295 in the rear main cargo area as it is flying high above the Indian Ocean. The Boeing 747 combined passenger/cargo aircraft (Combi) crashes with no survivors out of the 159 people on board. The exact cause of the fire is undetermined. Type of aircraft: Boeing 747-200 Combi
40	5	"Dead Weight"	Air Midwest Flight 5481	30 April 2008
On 8 January 2003, Air Midwest Flight 5481 crashes into an aircraft hangar at Charlotte Douglas International Airport seconds after takeoff on a flight to Greenville. All 21 people on board die. Investigation showed that the pilots' controls had been improperly adjusted during maintenance, and that the aircraft was overloaded due to outdated formulae for calculation of passenger weights. Type of aircraft: Beechcraft 1900D
41	6	"Southern Storm"	Southern Airways Flight 242	23 April 2008
On 4 April 1977, Southern Airways Flight 242, a flight from Huntsville, Alabama, to Atlanta, Georgia, flies through a severe thunderstorm and is hit by large hailstones. After both engines fail, the aircraft makes an emergency landing on a highway in New Hope, Paulding County, Georgia. However, it collides with a gas station and explodes, killing 63 people on board and nine on the ground. Type of aircraft: McDonnell Douglas DC-9-31
42	7	"Air India: Explosive Evidence"	Air India Flight 182	9 April 2008
On 23 June 1985, Air India Flight 182 explodes in mid-air over the coast of Ireland, killing all 329 passengers and crew members on board. The investigation traced the cause of the explosion to be a bomb from the Sikh militant group Babbar Khalsa. Type of aircraft: Boeing 747-200B
43	8	"Mixed Signals"	Birgenair Flight 301	4 June 2008
On 6 February 1996, Birgenair Flight 301 is scheduled to fly from Puerto Plata to Frankfurt. On takeoff, the captain finds that his airspeed indicator is not reading properly, though the co-pilot's indicator is showing the correct speed. The pilots become confused and believe that both indicators are malfunctioning, resulting in the aircraft stalling and crashing into the Atlantic Ocean, killing all 189 people on board. Type of aircraft: Boeing 757-200
44	9	"Fatal Distraction"	Eastern Air Lines Flight 401	28 May 2008
On 29 December 1972, Eastern Air Lines Flight 401 is on a flight to Miami International Airport. While making preparations to land, the crew are distracted by a faulty landing gear indicator light and accidentally disengage the autopilot while trying to resolve the problem. Flying at night, the crew fail to notice their descent until only seconds before crashing into the Everglades. Out of the 176 people on board, 101 are killed. Type of aircraft: Lockheed L-1011-1 Tristar
45	10	"Phantom Strike"	Gol Transportes Aéreos Flight 1907	11 June 2008
On 29 September 2006, Gol Transportes Aéreos Flight 1907 collides with a brand new business jet on its delivery flight over the Amazon. The Legacy manages to make a safe landing at an airbase, but the Gol jet—with most of its left wing missing—enters an uncontrollable spin and breaks up in midair, crashing into the Amazon rainforest, killing all 154 people on board. Air traffic controllers had cleared both aircraft to fly at the same altitude in opposite directions, and the Legacy's transponder was switched off, making both aircraft's traffic collision avoidance systems useless in preventing the collision. Type of aircraft: Flight 1907: Boeing 737-800; business jet: Embraer Legacy 600

=== Season 6 (2007–08) Special ===
Season 6 of Mayday is the first Science of Disaster season, consisting of three episodes. With the exceptions of BOAC Flight 781 and South African Airways Flight 201, all the incidents described in these episodes are summarised versions taken from their respective full episodes from the previous five seasons.

No. overall	No. in series	Title	Incident	Original release date
46	1	"Ripped Apart"	BOAC Flight 781; South African Airways Flight 201; Aloha Airlines Flight 243; British Airways Flight 5390; United Airlines Flight 811; Helios Airways Flight 522	16 December 2007
This special looked at accidents and incidents where pressurization failure or explosive decompression played a part. Types of aircraft: Flights 781 and 201: de Havilland DH.106 Comet 1; Flight 243: Boeing 737-200; Flight 5390: BAC 1-11 528FL; Flight 811: Boeing 747-100; Flight 522: Boeing 737-300
47	2	"Fatal Flaw"	Alaska Airlines Flight 261; Japan Air Lines Flight 123; Atlantic Southeast Airlines Flight 529; Swissair Flight 111; United Airlines Flight 585; USAir Flight 427; Eastwind Airlines Flight 517	16 December 2007
This special looked at accidents caused by seemingly minor defects or errors. Types of aircraft: Flight 261: McDonnell Douglas MD-83; Flight 123: Boeing 747SR; Flight 529: Embraer EMB 120 Brasilia; Flight 111: McDonnell Douglas MD-11; Flight 585: Boeing 737-200; Flight 427: Boeing 737-300; Flight 517: Boeing 737-200
48	3	"Who's Flying the Plane?"	Aeroperú Flight 603; China Airlines Flight 006; Aeroflot Flight 593; Flash Airlines Flight 604; Air Transat Flight 236	2 March 2008
This special looked at accidents and incidents where problems with the interface between crew members and on-board avionics were a factor and the causes of those problems. Types of aircraft: Flight 603: Boeing 757-200; Flight 006: Boeing 747SP; Flight 593: Airbus A310-300; Flight 604: Boeing 737-300; Flight 236: Airbus A330-200

=== Season 7 (2009) ===
No. overall	No. in series	Title	Incident	Original release date
49	1	"Scratching the Surface"	China Airlines Flight 611	18 November 2009
On 25 May 2002, China Airlines Flight 611 disintegrates in mid-air and crashes into the Taiwan Strait 20 minutes after taking off from Taipei, killing all 225 people on board. A faulty repair to the lower rear skin of the aircraft following a tailstrike more than 20 years earlier had caused the entire tail section to weaken and fail. Type of aircraft: Boeing 747-200B
50	2	"Lockerbie Disaster"	Pan Am Flight 103	4 November 2009
On 21 December 1988, a bomb explodes on Pan Am Flight 103, causing the aircraft to disintegrate in mid-air and the wreckage of the aircraft to crash into the Scottish town of Lockerbie, killing all 259 people on board and 11 people on the ground. Type of aircraft: Boeing 747-100
51	3	"Blown Apart"	Partnair Flight 394	25 November 2009
On 8 September 1989, Partnair Flight 394 loses control, breaks up in mid-air, and crashes into the North Sea, killing all 55 people on board. The aircraft's vertical stabilizer had vibrated loose during flight due to excessive wear on sub-standard bolts, sleeves, and pins that had been illegally sold as "aircraft-grade." Type of aircraft: Convair CV-580
52	4	"Sight Unseen"	1996 Charkhi Dadri mid-air collision	11 November 2009
On 12 November 1996, Saudia Flight 763 and Kazakhstan Airlines Flight 1907 collide in mid-air near New Delhi, India, killing all 349 people on both aircraft. The world's deadliest mid-air collision and the overall third-deadliest aircraft accident, the crash was caused by the crew members on the Kazakhstan Airlines aircraft failing to maintain the altitude assigned by air traffic control. Type of aircraft: Flight 763: Boeing 747-100B; Flight 1907: Ilyushin Il-76
53	5	"Operation Babylift"	1975 Tan Son Nhut Lockheed C-5 crash	2 December 2009
On 4 April 1975, a United States Air Force transport aircraft conducting the inaugural flight of Operation Babylift suffers an explosive decompression when the rear cargo door fails and crashes into a paddy field while attempting an emergency landing at Tan Son Nhut Air Base in South Vietnam, killing 138 people. The investigation found that parts had been removed from the rear cargo doors and improperly replaced. Type of aircraft: Lockheed C-5A Galaxy
54	6	"Falling Fast"	Tuninter Flight 1153	9 December 2009
On 6 August 2005, Tuninter Flight 1153 runs out of fuel and ditches into the Mediterranean Sea, killing 16 people. It was later determined that an incorrect type of fuel gauge had been installed, misleading the crew about how much fuel was on board. Type of aircraft: ATR 72-200
55	7	"Flight 574: Lost"	Adam Air Flight 574	16 December 2009
On 1 January 2007, Adam Air Flight 574 crashes into the Makassar Strait in Indonesia, killing all 102 people on board. The crew inadvertently disengaged the autopilot while trying to fix a problem with the aircraft's inertial reference system, causing it to roll into an uncontrolled dive and break up during flight. Type of aircraft: Boeing 737-400
56	8	"Frozen in Flight"	American Eagle Flight 4184	16 December 2009
On 31 October 1994, American Eagle Flight 4184 loses control and crashes into a field while circling to land at O'Hare International Airport, killing all 68 people on board. The crash was caused by ice developing on the wings in a manner that the on-board deicing system could not remove. Type of aircraft: ATR 72-200

=== Season 8 (2009) Special ===
Season 8 of Mayday is the second Science of Disaster season, consisting of two episodes.

No. overall	No. in series	Title	Incident	Original release date
57	1	"System Breakdown"	1956 Grand Canyon mid-air collision Aeroméxico Flight 498; Avianca Flight 052; Gol Transportes Aéreos Flight 1907; 2002 Überlingen mid-air collision	10 June 2009
This special looked at the role of air traffic controllers in the airline industry and examines the Next Generation Air Transportation System, a new technology meant to eliminate mid-air collisions by reducing overall dependence on radar and radio, as well as delegating some of the air traffic controllers' tasks to computers on board each aircraft. Types of aircraft: Grand Canyon collision: Lockheed L-1049 Super Constellation and Douglas DC-7; Cerritos collision: McDonnell Douglas DC-9-32 and Piper PA-28-181 Archer; Flight 052: Boeing 707-320B; Gol Transportes Aéreos collision: Boeing 737-800 and Embraer Legacy 600; Überlingen collision: Tupolev Tu-154M and Boeing 757-200PF
58	2	"Cruel Skies"	Southern Airways Flight 242; Delta Air Lines Flight 191; American Airlines Flight 1420; British Airways Flight 009	17 June 2009
This special looked at the role of bad weather in aviation disasters and examines the U.S. Aviation Weather Center in Kansas City, Missouri, to see how information on weather is transmitted to pilots in the sky. Types of aircraft: Flight 242: McDonnell Douglas DC-9-32; Flight 191: Lockheed L-1011-1 Tristar; Flight 1420: McDonnell Douglas MD-82; Flight 009: Boeing 747-200B

=== Season 9 (2010) ===
No. overall	No. in series	Title	Incident	Original release date
59	1	"Panic on the Runway"	1985 Manchester Airport disaster	1 March 2010
On 22 August 1985, an engine of British Airtours Flight 28M fails during takeoff, puncturing a hole in the wing fuel tank and starting a fire. The crew successfully abandons the takeoff and stops the aircraft on the runway, but the fire spreads to the cabin. Out of the 137 occupants on board the flight, 55 people die before they can evacuate, mainly due to inhaling toxic smoke. The investigation found that a defective engine fuel injector failed and ruptured the fuel tank. Type of aircraft: Boeing 737-200
60	2	"Alarming Silence"	Northwest Airlines Flight 255	15 March 2010
On 16 August 1987, shortly after takeoff from Detroit Metropolitan Airport, Northwest Airlines Flight 255 stalls and crashes just beyond the runway, killing all but 1 of the 155 people on board and 2 people on the ground. Subsequent investigation showed that the pilots failed to configure the aircraft's flaps and slats for takeoff. It was also discovered that the aural takeoff warning did not sound, but for unknown reasons. Type of aircraft: McDonnell Douglas MD-82
61	3	"Pilot vs. Plane"	Air France Flight 296Q	8 March 2010
On 26 June 1988, Air France Flight 296Q fails to climb and crashes into trees after performing a flyby during an airshow at Mulhouse-Habsheim Airport, killing three people. The cause of the crash is disputed: the investigation blamed the pilot, but the captain himself claims that the cause was a problem with the fly-by-wire computer. Type of aircraft: Airbus A320-100
62	4	"Cleared for Disaster"	1991 Los Angeles runway collision	22 March 2010
On 1 February 1991, USAir Flight 1493 collides with SkyWest Airlines Flight 5569 on the runway at Los Angeles International Airport, killing 35 people. An air traffic controller mistakenly assigned Flight 1493 to land on a runway where the SkyWest Airlines aircraft was waiting to take off. Note: This accident is covered again in the Season 25 episode "No Exit" (S25E11). Type of aircraft: Flight 1493: Boeing 737-300; Flight 5569: Fairchild Metro III
63	5	"Target Is Destroyed"	Korean Air Lines Flight 007	29 March 2010
In the early hours of 1 September 1983, during the Cold War, Korean Air Lines Flight 007 is shot down after violating Soviet Union airspace, killing all 269 people on board. The crew did not set the autopilot to the correct mode following takeoff, which caused the aircraft to stray off course. Type of aircraft: Boeing 747-200B
64	6	"Cold Case"	Air Ontario Flight 1363 and USAir Flight 405	12 April 2010
On 10 March 1989, Air Ontario Flight 1363 crashes just after takeoff in snowy weather, killing 24 people. Three years later, on 22 March 1992, USAir Flight 405 also crashes just after takeoff in similar conditions to Flight 1363, killing 27 people. The cause of both crashes was ice on the wings, which significantly reduced lift. Type of aircraft: Flight 1363: Fokker F28-1000; Flight 405: Fokker F28-4000
65	7	"The Final Blow"	Air Inter Flight 148	5 April 2010
On 20 January 1992, Air Inter Flight 148 flies into a mountain while circling to land at Strasbourg Airport, killing 87 people. An error made in programming the aircraft's autopilot, combined with a sudden wind change, caused it to descend more rapidly than expected. Type of aircraft: Airbus A320-100
66	8	"Cracks in the System"	Chalk's Ocean Airways Flight 101	19 April 2010
On 19 December 2005, just seconds after takeoff from Miami, Florida, the right wing of Chalk's Ocean Airways Flight 101 breaks off, causing the aircraft to crash into the sea, killing all 20 people on board. The cause of the crash was an improper repair of a fatigue crack in the wing. Type of aircraft: Grumman G-73T Turbine Mallard

=== Season 10 (2011) ===
No. overall	No. in series	Title	Incident	Original release date
67	1	"Cockpit Failure"	Crossair Flight 3597	12 March 2011
On 24 November 2001, Crossair Flight 3597 crashes into a hill during final approach to Zürich, killing 24 of the 33 passengers and crew members on board. The cause of the crash was the pilot descending the aircraft below the minimum safe altitude for the approach. Type of aircraft: British Aerospace 146
68	2	"The Heathrow Enigma"	British Airways Flight 38	7 March 2011
On 17 January 2008, British Airways Flight 38 is on its final approach to land, but when the autothrottles command increased thrust from the engines, the engines fail to respond. The captain raises one notch of flaps to give the aircraft a few more feet of flying distance; it crash-lands just short of the runway without any fatalities. The fuel flow to both engines was restricted because of ice crystals causing a blockage in the fuel-oil heat exchangers. Type of aircraft: Boeing 777-200ER
69	3	"Pilot Betrayed"	Scandinavian Airlines System Flight 751	28 March 2011
On 27 December 1991, Scandinavian Airlines System Flight 751 crash-lands without loss of life in Gottröra moments after taking off due to both engines failing. Clear ice from the tops of the wings had been sucked into both engines, causing internal damage. An automatic system (of which the pilots were unaware) to increase the engines' thrust contributed to their failure. Type of aircraft: McDonnell Douglas MD-81 (referred to in the episode as a McDonnell Douglas DC-9)
70	4	"Dead Tired"	Colgan Air Flight 3407	21 March 2011
On 12 February 2009, Colgan Air Flight 3407 stalls at low altitude and dives into a residential area near Buffalo, New York. All 49 people on board the aircraft and one person on the ground are killed. Several critical errors made by the flight crew might have been the result of their fatigue. Type of aircraft: Bombardier Q400
71	5	"Hudson River Runway"	US Airways Flight 1549	14 March 2011
On 15 January 2009, US Airways Flight 1549 suffers a bird strike with a flock of Canada geese after taking off from LaGuardia Airport in New York City, causing both engines to fail. Less than two minutes later, the pilots successfully ditch the aircraft in the Hudson River, saving all on board. Type of aircraft: Airbus A320-200
72	6	"Who's in Control?"	Turkish Airlines Flight 1951	28 February 2011
On 25 February 2009, Turkish Airlines Flight 1951 stalls and crashes 1.5 kilometres from the runway while approaching Amsterdam Airport Schiphol. Nine people, including the three cockpit crew members, are killed. A faulty radar altimeter permitted premature reduction of the engines' thrust, and the flight crew failed to notice the resulting drop in airspeed until it was too late. Type of aircraft: Boeing 737-800

=== Season 11 (2011–12) ===
No. overall	No. in series	Title	Incident	Original release date
73	1	"Deadly Reputation"	TAM Airlines Flight 3054	12 August 2011
On 17 July 2007, TAM Airlines Flight 3054 careens off runway 35L at Brazil's Congonhas Airport and crashes at high speed into a warehouse adjacent to a filling station, killing all 187 people on board the aircraft and 12 people on the ground. Incorrect engine throttle settings upon landing caused one engine to reverse thrust while the other increased power, causing the aircraft to lose control. Type of aircraft: Airbus A320-200
74	2	"The Plane That Flew Too High"	West Caribbean Airways Flight 708	19 August 2011
On 16 August 2005, West Caribbean Airways Flight 708 deep-stalls while cruising and crashes in rural Venezuela during a thunderstorm, killing all 160 people on board. Investigators determined that the pilots misinterpreted the stall as an engine failure and took no recovery action until it was too late. Type of aircraft: McDonnell Douglas MD-82
75	3	"Split Decision"	Arrow Air Flight 1285R	26 August 2011
On 12 December 1985, Arrow Air Flight 1285R, carrying troops of the U.S. Army's 101st Airborne Division, stalls and crashes just seconds after taking off from Gander International Airport in Canada, killing all 256 people on board. The cause of the crash remains disputed: the Canadian Aviation Safety Board (CASB) concluded that ice on the wings, combined with miscalculated weight, was the cause, but a minority report claims an on-board explosion. Type of aircraft: Douglas DC-8-63CF
76	4	"Breakup over Texas"	Continental Express Flight 2574	29 December 2011
On 11 September 1991, Continental Express Flight 2574 tips into a dive and crashes into a field while nearing the end of a flight from Laredo, Texas, to Houston. All 14 people on board are killed. Improper maintenance allowed a section of the horizontal stabilizer to break loose during flight, after which the pilots had no control. Type of aircraft: Embraer EMB 120 Brasilia
77	5	"Munich Air Disaster"	Munich air disaster	29 December 2011
On 6 February 1958, British European Airways Flight 609, carrying members of the famed Manchester United soccer team, club officials and journalists, crashes into a house about 300 metres from the end of the runway in Munich after it fails to become airborne, killing 23 of the 44 people on board. The cause of the crash was slush on the runway, which slowed the aircraft down and prevented it from reaching takeoff speed. Type of aircraft: Airspeed Ambassador
78	6	"Turning Point"	Northwest Airlines Flight 85	29 December 2011
On 9 October 2002, the lower rudder segment of Northwest Airlines Flight 85 suddenly deflects to the left. The pilots divert the aircraft to a successful emergency landing at Anchorage, Alaska, by using engine thrust for control. The incident was attributed to a malfunction of the rudder's hydraulic control module. Type of aircraft: Boeing 747-400
79	7	"Bad Attitude"	Korean Air Cargo Flight 8509	20 January 2012
On 22 December 1999, Korean Air Cargo Flight 8509 crashes into a field at night about 55 seconds after taking off from London Stansted Airport on a flight to Milan, Italy, killing all four crew members on board. The causes of the crash were the captain following the indications of a malfunctioning attitude indicator and lack of communication amongst the crew members. Type of aircraft: Boeing 747-200F
80	8	"Blind Spot"	Pacific Southwest Airlines Flight 182	27 January 2012
On 25 September 1978, Pacific Southwest Airlines Flight 182 collides with a light aircraft while approaching San Diego International Airport and crashes in a residential area in California. All 137 people on the two aircraft and 7 people on the ground are killed. Type of aircraft: Flight 182: Boeing 727-200; light aircraft: Cessna 172
81	9	"Under Pressure"	Nigeria Airways Flight 2120	3 February 2012
On 11 July 1991, Nigeria Airways Flight 2120 is taking off from King Abdulaziz International Airport with 247 Hajj pilgrims and 14 crew on board. Two under-inflated tires burst during the takeoff, starting a fire on the landing gear. The crew is unaware of the fire and retracts the gear after takeoff, causing the fire to spread. Encountering problems, the crew tries to return the aircraft to the airport, but it breaks up and crashes about 3 kilometres from the runway, with no survivors. Type of aircraft: Douglas DC-8-61
82	10	"I'm the Problem"	Pacific Southwest Airlines Flight 1771	10 February 2012
On 7 December 1987, Pacific Southwest Airlines Flight 1771 crashes at the speed of sound on a mountainside in rural San Luis Obispo County, California. All 43 people on board are killed. Investigators found that passenger David Burke, a former USAir employee, took a gun on board the aircraft and shot the pilots in a murder-suicide plot to kill his former supervisor (who was also a passenger on board) after being fired from his job days earlier. Type of aircraft: British Aerospace 146
83	11	"Nowhere to Land"	TACA Flight 110	9 March 2012
On 24 May 1988, TACA Flight 110 flies through a thunderstorm and both engines flame out. The captain manages to make a deadstick landing on a narrow grass levee in the Michoud area of eastern New Orleans, saving the lives of everyone on board. Type of aircraft: Boeing 737-300
84	12	"The Invisible Plane"	2001 Linate Airport runway collision	23 March 2012
On 8 October 2001, Scandinavian Airlines System Flight 686 is taking off at Milan Linate Airport in thick fog. On the runway, it collides with an Air Evex business jet bound for Paris, France. Flight 686 suffers major damage and crashes into a nearby building shortly afterwards. All 114 people on board the two aircraft are killed, along with 4 on the ground. The business jet's crew had made a wrong turn while taxiing in the fog and inadvertently taxied onto the runway. Type of aircraft: Flight 686: McDonnell Douglas MD-87 (referred to in the episode as a Boeing MD-87); business jet: Cessna Citation CJ2
85	13	"Impossible Landing"	United Airlines Flight 232	13 April 2012
On 19 July 1989, the tail-mounted number-two engine of United Airlines Flight 232 explodes, damaging all of the aircraft's hydraulic systems and leaving the flight controls unusable. By varying engine thrust, the pilots manage to crash-land the aircraft at the Sioux Gateway Airport in Iowa, saving the lives of 184 of the 296 people on board. Subsequent investigation traced the engine failure to a fatigue crack in the fan hub stemming from a defect introduced before the disk was even made (when the original titanium ingot used to make it was formed). Type of aircraft: McDonnell Douglas DC-10-10

=== Season 12 (2012–13) ===
No. overall	No. in series	Title	Incident	Original release date
86	1	"Fight for Control"	Reeve Aleutian Airways Flight 8	3 August 2012
On 8 June 1983, Reeve Aleutian Airways Flight 8's number-four propeller separates, tearing a gash on the aircraft's underside, jamming the flight controls and causing a rapid decompression. The pilots manage to land the aircraft safely at Anchorage, Alaska. The propeller fell into the sea, and since it was never recovered, the cause of the accident has not been determined. Type of aircraft: Lockheed L-188 Electra
87	2	"Fire in the Hold"	ValuJet Flight 592	10 August 2012
On 11 May 1996, 10 minutes after takeoff, ValuJet Flight 592 starts filling with smoke after a fire breaks out in the main cargo bay as it is flying over Miami. The aircraft crashes into the Florida Everglades, killing all 110 people on board. The cause of the fire was later determined to be an accidental triggering of a chemical oxygen generator illegally shipped as non-hazardous cargo. Type of aircraft: McDonnell Douglas DC-9-32
88	3	"Caution to the Wind"	Singapore Airlines Flight 006	17 August 2012
On 31 October 2000, Singapore Airlines Flight 006 collides with construction equipment at Chiang Kai Shek airport in Taipei while attempting to take off on the wrong runway in a typhoon, killing 83 of the 179 people on board. Investigators concluded that the crash was caused by pilot error. Type of aircraft: Boeing 747-400
89	4	"Pushed to the Limit"	SilkAir Flight 185	24 August 2012
On 19 December 1997, while en route to Singapore, SilkAir Flight 185 crashes into the Musi River in Indonesia after abruptly diving from its cruise altitude, killing all 104 passengers and crew members on board. The cause of the crash was disputed: a U.S. investigation concluded that it was an act of murder–suicide by the captain; however, the Indonesian investigators were undetermined. Type of aircraft: Boeing 737-300
90	5	"Blind Landing"	TANS Perú Flight 204	31 August 2012
On 23 August 2005, TANS Perú Flight 204 crashes into a muddy swamp while attempting to land at Pucallpa Airport, Peru, in a thunderstorm, killing 40 of the 98 people on board. The cause of the crash was the pilots not following visual flight rules while the aircraft was being pushed by a downdraft. Type of aircraft: Boeing 737-200 Advanced
91	6	"Grand Canyon Disaster"	1956 Grand Canyon mid-air collision	24 January 2013
On 30 June 1956, United Airlines Flight 718 and Trans World Airlines Flight 2 collide in mid-air over the Grand Canyon in Arizona, killing all 128 people on both aircraft. At the time, it was the deadliest-ever aviation accident, and would lead to major changes in the regulation of flight operations over the United States. Note: This accident was previously featured as a special in the episode "System Breakdown" (S08E01). And Stephen Bogaert, the narrator for the Canadian version, also played Captain Gandy. Type of aircraft: Flight 718: Douglas DC-7; Flight 2: Lockheed L-1049 Super Constellation
92	7	"Catastrophe at O'Hare"	American Airlines Flight 191	25 February 2013
On 25 May 1979, the number-one engine on American Airlines Flight 191 detaches moments after taking off from Chicago O'Hare International Airport. The aircraft banks to the left and crashes into an open field, killing all 271 people on board and 2 people on the ground. One of the mounting points in the pylon attaching the engine to the wing had suffered damage caused by faulty maintenance procedures. Type of aircraft: McDonnell Douglas DC-10-10
93	8	"Focused on Failure"	United Airlines Flight 173	11 March 2013
On 28 December 1978, the crew of United Airlines Flight 173 are preoccupied with a landing gear problem as the aircraft circles in a holding pattern in the vicinity of Portland, Oregon. It runs out of fuel and crashes in a sparsely populated area, killing 10 of the 189 people on board. The pilot failed to acknowledge the warnings of the remaining crew regarding the aircraft's fuel state, while the remaining crew failed to adequately communicate the situation. Type of aircraft: Douglas DC-8-61
94	9	"Lokomotiv Hockey Team Disaster"	Lokomotiv Yaroslavl plane crash	4 March 2013
On 7 September 2011, YAK-Service Flight 9633, carrying the Lokomotiv Yaroslavl professional ice hockey team, crashes shortly after takeoff at Yaroslavl, Russia, killing all but one of the 45 occupants. The investigation found that the pilots were not properly trained on the aircraft type and mishandled it during takeoff. Type of aircraft: Yakovlev Yak-42D
95	10	"Death of the President"	Smolensk air disaster	27 January 2013
On 10 April 2010, Polish Air Force Flight 101, carrying the President of Poland Lech Kaczyński, his wife Maria Kaczyńska and other top officials, crashes in a wooded area while on final approach to Smolensk North Airport in heavy fog and low visibility. All 96 passengers and crew members on board are killed. Type of aircraft: Tupolev Tu-154M
96	11	"Heading to Disaster"	Ethiopian Airlines Flight 409	25 March 2013
On 25 January 2010, shortly after takeoff from Beirut–Rafic Hariri International Airport during a thunderstorm, Ethiopian Airlines Flight 409 plunges into the Mediterranean Sea while on a flight to Addis Ababa, killing all 90 people on board. Type of aircraft: Boeing 737-800
97	12	"28 Seconds to Survive"	Santa Bárbara Airlines Flight 518	1 April 2013
On 21 February 2008, Santa Bárbara Airlines Flight 518 strays off course and flies into the side of a mountain shortly after takeoff, killing all 46 people on board. Investigators determined that the aircraft took off with inoperative navigation equipment due to the pilots' failure to do their pre-flight checklist. Type of aircraft: ATR 42-300
98	13	"Air France 447: Vanished"	Air France Flight 447	15 April 2013
On 1 June 2009, Air France Flight 447 stalls and crashes into the Atlantic Ocean while flying through a thunderstorm, killing all 228 people on board. The causes of the crash were incorrect airspeed readings due to ice blocking the aircraft's pitot tubes and inappropriate control inputs by the crew. Type of aircraft: Airbus A330-200

=== Season 13 (2013–14) ===
No. overall	No. in series	Title	Incident	Original release date
99	1	"Fight to the Death"	British European Airways Flight 548	16 December 2013
On 18 June 1972, British European Airways Flight 548 stalls and crashes in a field near Staines shortly after takeoff from London Heathrow Airport, killing all 118 people on board. The crash was attributed to the pilot retracting the aircraft's droops at too low an airspeed and failing to recognize the stall warnings. Type of aircraft: Hawker Siddeley Trident 1C
100	2	"Speed Trap"	Hughes Airwest Flight 706	30 December 2013
On 6 June 1971, Hughes Airwest Flight 706 collides with a United States Marine Corps (USMC) fighter jet above the San Gabriel Mountains. A total of 50 people from the two aircraft are killed, with the backseat crewman of the USMC aircraft the only survivor. Type of aircraft: Flight 706: McDonnell Douglas DC-9-31; USMC jet: McDonnell Douglas F-4 Phantom II
101	3	"Lost in Translation"	Crossair Flight 498	13 January 2014
On 10 January 2000, Crossair Flight 498 crashes just two minutes after takeoff from Zürich, Switzerland, while heading for Dresden, Germany, killing all 10 people on board. The investigation found that the pilots had suffered spatial disorientation. Type of aircraft: Saab 340B
102	4	"Disaster on the Potomac"	Air Florida Flight 90	23 December 2013
On 13 January 1982, Air Florida Flight 90 stalls at 300 feet altitude, strikes a road bridge and crashes into the Potomac River, killing 78 people. The causes were ice on the wings and the pilots' failure to turn on the engines' anti-freeze system, causing erroneous engine instrument readings. Type of aircraft: Boeing 737-200
103	5	"Queens Catastrophe"	American Airlines Flight 587	6 January 2014
On 12 November 2001, just two months after the September 11 attacks, American Airlines Flight 587 spirals out of control shortly after taking off from John F. Kennedy International Airport and crashes into Queens, killing all 260 people on board and five people on the ground. It was later determined that aggressive rudder use by the first officer in response to wake turbulence from a Boeing 747-400 that had taken off minutes earlier had caused the vertical stabilizer to detach from the aircraft. Type of aircraft: Airbus A300-600
104	6	"Into the Eye of the Storm"	1989 Hurricane Hunters NOAA 42 incident	10 February 2014
On 15 September 1989, a National Oceanic and Atmospheric Administration aircraft tasked with intercepting Hurricane Hugo over the Caribbean islands is jolted by strong winds, causing an engine to catch fire and fail. The pilots of the aircraft manage to make a safe emergency landing. Type of aircraft: Lockheed WP-3D Orion
105	7	"Massacre over the Mediterranean"	Itavia Flight 870	20 January 2014
On 27 June 1980, Itavia Flight 870 crashes into the Tyrrhenian Sea near the island of Ustica, Italy. All 81 people on board are killed. The top Italian criminal court eventually ruled on 23 January 2013 that a missile strike brought down the aircraft, but controversy remains; some experts dispute this conclusion, arguing that an on-board bomb in the rear toilet was the cause. No definitive accident report was published. Type of aircraft: McDonnell Douglas DC-9-15
106	8	"Imperfect Pitch"	XL Airways Germany Flight 888T	3 February 2014
On 27 November 2008, an aircraft on a post-maintenance test flight operating as XL Airways Germany Flight 888T stalls and crashes into the Mediterranean Sea off the coast of France, killing all seven people on board. Improper maintenance work allowed water to enter the aircraft's angle of attack (AOA) sensors; the water then froze during flight, and the sensors stopped working. When the crew tried to test the stall warning system during flight, the aircraft stalled. Type of aircraft: Airbus A320-200
107	9	"Terror in Paradise"	Air Moorea Flight 1121	27 January 2014
On 9 August 2007, Air Moorea Flight 1121 crashes shortly after taking off from Moorea Airport in French Polynesia, killing all 19 passengers and the pilot. A badly worn elevator control cable had failed completely in flight. As the force on the elevators changes with flap retraction, the cable broke after being overloaded. The situation was aggravated by the aircraft being repeatedly buffeted by jet blast from larger aircraft while parked, stressing the cables further. Type of aircraft: de Havilland Canada DHC-6 Twin Otter
108	10	"Titanic in the Sky"	Qantas Flight 32	17 February 2014
On 4 November 2010, shortly after takeoff from Singapore, the number-two engine on Qantas Flight 32 partially disintegrates, causing serious damage to its left wing. The crew members overcome a number of resulting failures and make a safe emergency landing back at Singapore with no injuries among the 469 passengers and crew members. Investigators traced the engine failure to a manufacturing fault in an oil pipe. Note: This is the 100th aircraft case investigated on Mayday. Type of aircraft: Airbus A380-800
109	11	"Getting out Alive"	Asiana Airlines Flight 214; Air France Flight 358; Reeve Aleutian Airways Flight 8 Air Canada Flight 797; US Airways Flight 1549	9 May 2014
This special looked at how people survive aviation accidents, in part with demonstrations at the Czech Airlines Training Centre. Types of aircraft: Flight 214: Boeing 777-200ER; Flight 358: Airbus A340-300; Flight 8: Lockheed L-188 Electra; Flight 797: McDonnell Douglas DC-9-32; Flight 1549: Airbus A320-200

=== Season 14 (2015) ===
No. overall	No. in series	Title	Incident	Original release date
110	1	"Choosing Sides"	Kegworth air disaster	5 January 2015
On 8 January 1989, British Midland Airways Flight 092 crashes onto the embankment of the M1 motorway near Kegworth, Leicestershire, UK. The aircraft was attempting to conduct an emergency landing at East Midlands Airport after one of its engines had failed. 47 of the 126 people on board died. Type of aircraft: Boeing 737-400
111	2	"Niki Lauda: Testing the Limits"	Lauda Air Flight 004	12 January 2015
On 26 May 1991, the thrust reverser on the number one engine of Lauda Air Flight 004 deploys in flight without being commanded, causing the aircraft to spiral out of control, disintegrate, and crash about 100 miles northwest of Bangkok, with no survivors out of the 223 people on board. Investigators later determined the cause of the false deployment to be a malfunction of an electronically-controlled hydraulic valve. Type of aircraft: Boeing 767-300ER
112	3	"Vanishing Act"	Varig Flight 254	10 February 2015
On 3 September 1989, the pilots of Varig Flight 254 enter an incorrect compass heading into their instruments before takeoff. Flying on autopilot once airborne, the aircraft heads west instead of north-northeast towards its destination. After some time, it is over a remote area of the Amazon jungle. The aircraft eventually runs out of fuel, and the pilot makes a belly landing in the jungle, during which the aircraft breaks up, killing 12 people. Type of aircraft: Boeing 737-200
113	4	"Sideswiped"	Copa Airlines Flight 201	2 March 2015
On 6 June 1992, Copa Airlines Flight 201 enters a high-speed dive, breaks up in mid-air, and crashes into the Darién Gap 29 minutes after taking off from Tocumen International Airport, killing all 47 people on board. The incident was caused by faulty instrument readings, confusion among the pilots, and insufficient training. Type of aircraft: Boeing 737-200 Advanced
114	5	"The Final Push"	FedEx Express Flight 14 and FedEx Express Flight 80	16 February 2015
On 31 July 1997, FedEx Express Flight 14 bounces, rolls to the right and crashes on landing at Newark Liberty International Airport. All five of the people on board survive. On 23 March 2009, FedEx Express Flight 80 also bounces and crashes on landing at Narita International Airport, Japan, in similar circumstances to that of Flight 14, killing both of the pilots. Note: This episode mainly focuses on Fedex Express Flight 80, the second crash. Type of aircraft: Flight 14: McDonnell Douglas MD-11F (referred to in the episode as a Boeing MD-11); Flight 80: McDonnell Douglas MD-11 (freighter conversion)
115	6	"The Death of JFK Jr."	1999 Martha's Vineyard plane crash	20 January 2015
On 16 July 1999, John F. Kennedy Jr. dies when the Piper Saratoga light aircraft he is piloting crashes off the coast of Martha's Vineyard, Massachusetts, in hazy conditions. His wife, Carolyn Bessette-Kennedy, and sister-in-law, Lauren Bessette, are on board and are also killed. The NTSB concluded that the crash was caused by spatial disorientation resulting in pilot error. Type of aircraft: Piper PA-32R-301 Saratoga II
116	7	"Concorde - Up in Flames"	Air France Flight 4590	13 January 2015
On 25 July 2000, a Concorde operating as Air France Flight 4590 stalls and crashes into a hotel in Gonesse shortly after takeoff from Charles de Gaulle Airport, killing all of the 109 people on board and 4 on the ground. The aircraft had struck foreign debris left on the runway from a previous departing aircraft, bursting one of the landing gear's high-pressure tyres, which caused the rupture and ignition of one of the flight's fuel tanks and the failure of the left wing engines. Type of aircraft: Aérospatiale/BAC Concorde
117	8	"Accident or Assassination"	2008 Mexico City Learjet 45 crash	17 February 2015
On 4 November 2008, an official Mexican Interior Ministry Learjet 45 crashes in rush-hour traffic in central Mexico City. All nine occupants, including Mexican Secretary of the Interior Juan Camilo Mouriño, are killed in the crash, along with seven people on the ground. The aircraft crashed due to a loss of control from wake turbulence from a Mexicana Boeing 767-300ER and pilot error from fraudulently certified flight crew. Type of aircraft: Learjet 45
118	9	"No Clear Options"	Manx2 Flight 7100	9 February 2015
On 10 February 2011, Manx2 Flight 7100 crashes at Cork Airport in Ireland after the pilots lose control of the aircraft in an attempted go-around in heavy fog and low visibility. Six of the twelve people on board the aircraft are killed in the accident. Note: The investigative team of this incident declined to co-operate with the program out of respect for the survivors and victims' families. Type of aircraft: Fairchild SA227-BC Metro III
119	10	"Death in the Arctic"	First Air Flight 6560	24 February 2015
On 20 August 2011, First Air Flight 6560, a charter flight, crashes near its destination of Resolute Bay Airport in Resolute, Nunavut, Canada, in poor weather conditions. Out of the fifteen passengers and crew members, only three survived. Type of aircraft: Boeing 737-200C
120	11	"What Happened to Malaysian 370?"	Malaysia Airlines Flight 370	15 February 2015
On 8 March 2014, Malaysia Airlines Flight 370 disappears en route from Kuala Lumpur to Beijing with 239 passengers and crew on board. As of February 2015, no trace of the aircraft had been found, and speculation is that it crashed in the southern part of the Indian Ocean. Type of aircraft: Boeing 777-200ER

=== Season 15 (2016) ===
No. overall	No. in series	Title	Incident	Original release date
121	1	"Fatal Transmission"	United Express Flight 5925	6 January 2016
On 19 November 1996, United Express Flight 5925, operating for Great Lakes Airlines, lands at Quincy Regional Airport and collides with a light aircraft taking off from an intersecting runway. All 12 occupants on the Beechcraft 1900C died in a subsequent fire along with both pilots of the Beechcraft King Air. Type of aircraft: Flight 5925: Beechcraft 1900C; light aircraft: Beechcraft 65-A90 King Air
122	2	"Terror in San Francisco"	Asiana Airlines Flight 214	13 January 2016
On 6 July 2013, while landing at San Francisco International Airport, Asiana Airlines Flight 214 strikes a seawall and crashes short of the runway. Of the 307 people on board, 2 passengers die at the crash scene; another dies shortly after in hospital. Note: This accident was previously featured as a special in the episode "Getting out Alive" (S13E11). Type of aircraft: Boeing 777-200ER
123	3	"High Rise Catastrophe"	El Al Flight 1862	1 February 2016
On 4 October 1992, the two engines on El Al Flight 1862's right wing detach from the aircraft after it departs from Amsterdam Airport Schiphol, damaging the right wing's hydraulic systems and a large portion of its leading edge. On approach, the flaps and slats on the left wing deploy while those on the right wing do not, due to the damage sustained. The aircraft rolls to the right and crashes into an apartment complex, killing all 4 on board and 39 on the ground. Type of aircraft: Boeing 747-200F
124	4	"Fatal Delivery"	UPS Airlines Flight 6	11 January 2016
On 3 September 2010, the pilots of UPS Airlines Flight 6 report a fire and declare an emergency shortly after taking off from Dubai International Airport. The crew tries to land back at the airport, but are unsuccessful. The aircraft flies over the airport and crashes into an unpopulated area nearby, killing both of the pilots. The fire was caused by the combustion of lithium-ion batteries. Type of aircraft: Boeing 747-400F
125	5	"Deadly Mission"	1961 Ndola Transair Sweden Douglas DC-6 crash	3 February 2016
On 18 September 1961, a Douglas DC-6 operated by Transair Sweden, carrying Dag Hammarskjöld, the second Secretary-General of the United Nations, crashes en route to ceasefire negotiations in Northern Rhodesia during the Congo Crisis. All of the 16 passengers and crew members are killed. Type of aircraft: Douglas DC-6B
126	6	"Edge of Disaster"	Atlantic Airways Flight 670	10 February 2016
On 10 October 2006, Atlantic Airways Flight 670 lands at Stord Airport, but overruns the runway and crashes after careening off a steep embankment. Four of the sixteen people on board are killed. The causes of the crash were a malfunction of the aircraft's spoilers and hydroplaning. Type of aircraft: British Aerospace 146-200A
127	7	"Deadly Delay"	Spanair Flight 5022	17 February 2016
On 20 August 2008, Spanair Flight 5022 stalls, banks to the right and crashes during its second takeoff attempt, killing 154 of the 172 people on board. The investigation determined that when the pilots retracted the flaps and slats during the delay, they forgot to re-extend them afterwards. It was also determined that the takeoff warning did not sound due to a possible failure of a relay. Type of aircraft: McDonnell Douglas MD-82
128	8	"Fatal Focus"	Garuda Indonesia Flight 200	4 January 2016
On 7 March 2007, while landing at Yogyakarta at the end of a routine domestic flight from Jakarta, Garuda Indonesia Flight 200 hits the ground so hard that it bounces violently before running off the end of the runway, killing 21 of the 140 people on board. The aircraft was meant to land with the flaps extended to an angle of 40°, but it landed with flap extension of only 5°, which was aggravated by the Captain's insistence on landing the aircraft, even when it was travelling too fast. Type of aircraft: Boeing 737-400
129	9	"Steep Impact"	Atlantic Southeast Airlines Flight 2311	25 January 2016
On 5 April 1991, Atlantic Southeast Airlines Flight 2311 nose-dives into the ground while on landing approach to Glynco Jetport in Brunswick, Georgia, killing all 23 people on board, including U.S. Senator John Tower and astronaut Sonny Carter. The accident was caused by a malfunction of the left engine's propeller control unit which led to incorrect pitch angles on the left propeller's blades. Type of aircraft: Embraer EMB 120 Brasilia
130	10	"Carnage in São Paulo"	TAM Transportes Aéreos Regionais Flight 402	15 February 2016
On 31 October 1996, TAM Transportes Aéreos Regionais Flight 402 crashes into a heavily populated residential area seconds after takeoff from São Paulo–Congonhas Airport, killing all 95 people on board and 4 on the ground. The crash was attributed to the uncommanded deployment of a faulty thrust reverser on the right engine, which was aggravated by the co-pilot's forceful inputs on the right engine's throttle. Type of aircraft: Fokker 100

=== Season 16 (2016–17) ===
No. overall	No. in series	Title	Incident	Original release date
131	1	"Deadly Silence"	1999 South Dakota Learjet 35 crash	7 June 2016
On 25 October 1999, a chartered Learjet 35 operated by Sunjet Aviation, carrying golfer Payne Stewart and his agents, flies off course shortly after takeoff. It runs out of fuel and crashes into a field in South Dakota, killing all 6 occupants on board. The investigation concluded that everyone on board suffered hypoxia due to an uncontrolled decompression, but the cause remains undetermined. Type of aircraft: Learjet 35
132	2	"9/11: The Pentagon Attack"	American Airlines Flight 77	14 June 2016
On 11 September 2001, during the September 11 attacks, American Airlines Flight 77 flies off course and crashes into the Pentagon in Arlington County, Virginia, after being hijacked. All the 64 people on board the aircraft, including the 5 hijackers, are killed, along with 125 people in the building. Type of aircraft: Boeing 757-200
133	3	"Disaster at Tenerife"	Tenerife airport disaster	21 June 2016
On 27 March 1977, the deadliest-ever aviation accident occurs at Los Rodeos Airport (now known as Tenerife North Airport) in the Canary Islands. KLM Flight 4805 and Pan Am Flight 1736 collide on the runway in thick fog during the KLM aircraft's attempt to take off, killing 583 people. Note: This accident was previously shown on the 2005 "Crash of the Century" special. Although the program is not regarded as a Mayday episode, Cineflix used the footage on a few episodes of Mayday. Type of aircraft: Flight 4805: Boeing 747-200B; Flight 1736: Boeing 747-100
134	4	"Deadly Detail"	China Airlines Flight 120	28 June 2016
On 20 August 2007, China Airlines Flight 120 catches fire and explodes after landing and taxiing to the gate area at Naha Airport in Okinawa, Japan. However, all 165 people on board survive. The incident was attributed to a fuel leak caused by a bolt from the aircraft's right wing slat puncturing the right wing fuel tank. Type of aircraft: Boeing 737-800
135	5	"Deadly Detour"	Proteus Airlines Flight 706	5 July 2016
On 30 July 1998, Proteus Airlines Flight 706 collides with a light aircraft during a detour over an ocean liner and crashes into Quiberon Bay off the coast of Lorient, France. All 15 occupants on board the two aircraft die. The crew of the Beechcraft did not use the See and Avoid concept when they were operating under visual flight rules, and the pilot of the Cardinal had failed to turn on his aircraft's transponder, effectively making the aircraft invisible to radar systems on the ground. Type of aircraft: Flight 706: Beechcraft 1900D; light aircraft: Cessna 177 Cardinal
136	6	"Dangerous Approach"	Trans-Colorado Airlines Flight 2286	12 July 2016
On 19 January 1988, Trans-Colorado Airlines Flight 2286, operating for Continental Express, crashes near Bayfield, Colorado, during final approach to Durango. Both crew members and seven of the fifteen passengers on board died in the accident. Type of aircraft: Fairchild SA227-AC Metro III
137	7	"Murder in the Skies"	Germanwings Flight 9525	23 January 2017
On 24 March 2015, Germanwings Flight 9525 enters a high-speed descent and crashes into the French Alps during a flight from Barcelona, Spain, to Düsseldorf, Germany. All 150 people on board are killed. The investigation concluded that the crash was caused by an act of murder-suicide by the co-pilot. Type of aircraft: Airbus A320-200
138	8	"River Runway"	Garuda Indonesia Flight 421	30 January 2017
On 16 January 2002, on final approach to Yogyakarta at the end of a routine domestic flight from Ampenan, Garuda Indonesia Flight 421 suffers a double engine flameout while flying through a severe thunderstorm and ditches in the Bengawan Solo River. 59 of the 60 people on board survive. Type of aircraft: Boeing 737-300
139	9	"Deadly Solution"	Indonesia AirAsia Flight 8501	6 February 2017
On 28 December 2014, Indonesia AirAsia Flight 8501 stalls and crashes into the Java Sea while flying through a thunderstorm, killing all 155 passengers and 7 crew members on board. The causes of the crash were a malfunction of the aircraft's rudder travel limiter unit and an inappropriate response by the pilots. Type of aircraft: Airbus A320-200
140	10	"Afghan Nightmare"	National Airlines Flight 102	13 February 2017
On 29 April 2013, National Airlines Flight 102 stalls and crashes into the ground just seconds after taking off from Bagram Airfield in Afghanistan, killing all seven crew members on board. The investigation determined that a vehicle in the aircraft's cargo bay had shifted, causing the loss of control. Type of aircraft: Boeing 747-400BCF

=== Season 17 (2017) ===
No. overall	No. in series	Title	Incident	Original release date
141	1	"Killer Attitude"	Northwest Airlink Flight 5719	20 February 2017
On 1 December 1993, Northwest Airlink Flight 5719 crashes into a hillside while on final approach to Chisholm-Hibbing Airport in Hibbing, Minnesota. All 16 passengers and 2 crew members on board are killed in the crash. Type of aircraft: Jetstream 31
142	2	"Deadly Myth"	Comair Flight 3272	27 February 2017
On 9 January 1997, Comair Flight 3272 spirals out of control and crashes nose-first while on final approach to Detroit Metropolitan Airport. All 29 passengers and crew members on board are killed. The investigation concluded that ice had built up on the aircraft's wings, causing the loss of control. Type of aircraft: Embraer EMB 120 Brasilia
143	3	"Turning Point"	Air China Flight 129	6 March 2017
On 15 April 2002, Air China Flight 129 crashes into the side of a mountain while circling to land at Gimhae International Airport in Busan, South Korea, during inclement weather. 129 of the 166 passengers and crew members on board are killed in the crash. Type of aircraft: Boeing 767-200ER
144	4	"Explosive Proof"	TWA Flight 800	13 March 2017
On 17 July 1996, Trans World Airlines (TWA) Flight 800 explodes in mid-air, breaks up, and crashes into the Atlantic Ocean while en route from John F. Kennedy International Airport to Paris-Charles de Gaulle Airport. All 230 passengers and crew members on board are killed. Type of aircraft: Boeing 747-100
145	5	"Lethal Turn"	Garuda Indonesia Flight 152	5 September 2017
On 26 September 1997, Garuda Indonesia Flight 152 crashes into mountainous woodlands while trying to land at Polonia International Airport in Medan, North Sumatra, in low visibility. All 234 people on board are killed. The investigation determined that the aircraft turned the wrong way during the approach due to a miscommunication between the pilots and air traffic control. Type of aircraft: Airbus A300B4-200
146	6	"Storming Out"	USAir Flight 1016	12 September 2017
On 2 July 1994, USAir Flight 1016 crashes into a residential area while attempting to land at Charlotte Douglas International Airport during a thunderstorm, killing 37 of the 57 people on board. The investigation concluded that the aircraft encountered microburst-induced wind shear while the captain suffered somatogravic illusion, prompting the first officer to push the nose down and causing the crash. Type of aircraft: McDonnell Douglas DC-9-31
147	7	"Caught on Tape"	TransAsia Airways Flight 235	19 September 2017
On 4 February 2015, TransAsia Airways Flight 235 strikes a viaduct and crashes into the Keelung River shortly after takeoff from Taipei Songshan Airport, killing 43 of the 58 people on board. The causes of the crash were a malfunction of the number two engine and the pilots shutting down the wrong engine. Type of aircraft: ATR 72-600
148	8	"Terror over Egypt"	Metrojet Flight 9268	18 September 2017
On 31 October 2015, Metrojet Flight 9268 disintegrates in mid-air and crashes into the Sinai Peninsula during a routine chartered flight from Sharm El Sheikh International Airport to Pulkovo Airport, killing all 224 people on board. Type of aircraft: Airbus A321-200
149	9	"Deadly Discussions"	LAPA Flight 3142	3 October 2017
On 31 August 1999, LAPA Flight 3142 overruns the runway and crashes while taking off from Aeroparque Jorge Newbery in Buenos Aires, Argentina, killing 63 of the 100 people on board and 2 on the ground. The investigation determined that the pilots forgot to extend the aircraft's flaps and slats for takeoff. Type of aircraft: Boeing 737-200C
150	10	"The Lost Plane"	Thai Airways International Flight 311	2 October 2017
On 31 July 1992, Thai Airways International Flight 311 crashes into a mountain while on final approach to Tribhuvan International Airport in Kathmandu, Nepal, in poor weather conditions, killing all 99 passengers and 14 crew members on board. Type of aircraft: Airbus A310-300

=== Season 18 (2018) ===
No. overall	No. in series	Title	Incident	Original release date
151	1	"Nuts and Bolts"	Emery Worldwide Airlines Flight 17	13 February 2018
On 16 February 2000, Emery Worldwide Airlines Flight 17 crashes into an automobile salvage yard shortly after taking off from Sacramento Mather Airport on a flight to Dayton, Ohio, killing all 3 crew members on board. The cause of the crash was a disconnection of the right elevator control tab. Type of aircraft: Douglas DC-8-71F
152	2	"Blown Away"	TransAsia Airways Flight 222	20 February 2018
On 23 July 2014, TransAsia Airways Flight 222 crashes into the village of Xixi while attempting to land at Magong Airport during inclement weather and low visibility, killing 48 of the 58 people on board and injuring 5 people in the village. The investigation found that the pilots intentionally descended below the minimum descent altitude. Type of aircraft: ATR 72-500
153	3	"Deadly Distraction"	Delta Air Lines Flight 1141	27 February 2018
On 31 August 1988, Delta Air Lines Flight 1141 crashes beyond the runway while taking off from Dallas/Fort Worth International Airport, killing 14 of the 108 people on board. The subsequent investigation determined that the pilots forgot to extend the aircraft's flaps and slats for takeoff. Type of aircraft: Boeing 727-200 Advanced
154	4	"Deadly Airspace"	Malaysia Airlines Flight 17	15 February 2018
On 17 July 2014, Malaysia Airlines Flight 17 disintegrates in mid-air over Hrabove in Donetsk Oblast, Ukraine, and crashes while en route from Amsterdam to Kuala Lumpur, killing all 283 passengers and 15 crew members on board. The subsequent investigation concluded that a Buk surface-to-air missile launched by pro-Russian rebels taking part in the war in Donbas caused the in-flight break-up. Type of aircraft: Boeing 777-200ER
155	5	"Deadly Display"	2012 Mount Salak Sukhoi Superjet crash	15 March 2018
On 9 May 2012, Sukhoi Civil Aircraft Flight 36801 crashes into Mount Salak, in the province of West Java while on a demonstration flight. All 45 people on board are killed. The investigation concluded that the pilots were unaware of the presence of high ground in the area and ignored warnings from the terrain warning system. Type of aircraft: Sukhoi Superjet 100
156	6	"Deadly Mission"	VSS Enterprise crash	22 March 2018
On 31 October 2014, an experimental spaceflight test vehicle named VSS Enterprise suffers a catastrophic in-flight breakup and crashes into the Mojave Desert in California, United States, while performing a test flight. The co-pilot, Michael Alsbury, is killed; the pilot, Peter Siebold, is seriously injured, but manages to parachute to safety. Type of aircraft: Scaled Composites Model 339 SpaceShipTwo
157	7	"Free Fall"	Qantas Flight 72	15 June 2018
On 7 October 2008, Qantas Flight 72 suffers a pair of sudden uncommanded pitch-down manoeuvres during a flight from Singapore Changi Airport to Perth Airport, injuring 119 of the 315 people on board. The aircraft makes an emergency landing at Learmonth Airport near Exmouth, Western Australia, with no fatalities. Type of aircraft: Airbus A330-300
158	8	"Deadly Inclination"	Alitalia Flight 404	22 June 2018
On 14 November 1990, Alitalia Flight 404 descends too low and crashes into the woodlands of the Stadlerberg Mountain near Weiach, Switzerland, 5.2 nautical miles (9.6 kilometres) short of the runway during final approach to Zurich Airport. All 46 passengers and crew members on board are killed. Type of aircraft: McDonnell Douglas DC-9-32
159	9	"Deadly Go-Round"	China Airlines Flight 140	27 June 2018
On 26 April 1994, China Airlines Flight 140 pitches upwards, enters an aerodynamic stall at low altitude and crashes approximately 340 feet east-northeast of the centreline of the runway while on final approach to Nagoya Airport in Nagoya, Japan. 264 of the 271 people on board are killed in the crash. Type of aircraft: Airbus A300B4-600R
160	10	"Dead of Winter"	Continental Airlines Flight 1713	4 July 2018
On 15 November 1987, Continental Airlines Flight 1713 stalls and crashes off the right side of the runway shortly after taking off in a snowstorm from Stapleton International Airport in Denver, Colorado, on a scheduled flight to Boise, Idaho, killing 28 of the 82 people on board. Type of aircraft: McDonnell Douglas DC-9-14

=== Season 19 (2019) ===
No. overall	No. in series	Title	Incident	Original release date
161	1	"Deadly Descent"	Cathay Pacific Flight 780	2 January 2019
On 13 April 2010, Cathay Pacific Flight 780 suffers a dual engine failure while nearing Hong Kong International Airport at the end of a flight from Juanda International Airport, Indonesia. The aircraft makes an emergency landing at almost twice the speed of a normal landing. All 322 people on board survive. Type of aircraft: Airbus A330-300
162	2	"Death Race"	2011 Reno Air Races crash	7 January 2019
On 16 September 2011, a vintage fighter aircraft named The Galloping Ghost crashes into spectators during the Reno Air Races, killing the pilot, Jimmy Leeward, and 10 people on the ground. The cause of the crash were reused single-use locknuts in the left elevator trim tab system that loosened, causing that trim tab to break off. Type of aircraft: North American P-51 Mustang
163	3	"Fatal Approach"	KLM Cityhopper Flight 433	16 January 2019
On 4 April 1994, KLM Cityhopper Flight 433 crashes into a field while attempting an emergency landing at Amsterdam Schiphol Airport, killing 3 of the 24 people on board. The cause of the crash was the pilots' inadequate use of the flight controls during an asymmetric go-around. Type of aircraft: Saab 340B
164	4	"Borderline Tactics"	American International Airways Flight 808	14 January 2019
On 18 August 1993, American International Airways Flight 808 stalls while banking to the right and crashes into the ground 1 quarter of a mile short of the runway while manoeuvring onto final approach to Leeward Point Field in Guantánamo Bay, Cuba. All 3 crew members on board survive. This is the first aviation accident where pilot fatigue was cited as a probable cause. Type of aircraft: Douglas DC-8-61F
165	5	"Deadly Pitch"	Fine Air Flight 101	21 January 2019
On 7 August 1997, Fine Air Flight 101 stalls and crashes just seconds after taking off from Miami International Airport, killing all 4 people on board and 1 person on the ground. The causes of the crash were an improper loading of cargo and the pilots selecting an incorrect stabilizer trim setting. Type of aircraft: Douglas DC-8-61F
166	6	"Fatal Climb"	TAROM Flight 371	28 January 2019
On 31 March 1995, TAROM Flight 371 banks steeply to the left and crashes into a field shortly after taking off from Otopeni International Airport, killing all 60 people on board. The throttle of the left engine had returned to idle in-flight while the captain simultaneously became incapacitated, possibly due to a heart attack. Type of aircraft: Airbus A310-300
167	7	"Runway Runoff"	Continental Airlines Flight 1404	11 February 2019
On 20 December 2008, Continental Airlines Flight 1404 veers off the side of the runway, skids across the taxiway and a service road and crashes into a ravine while taking off from Denver International Airport in Denver, Colorado. All 115 passengers and crew members on board survive. Type of aircraft: Boeing 737-500
168	8	"Lethal Limits"	Aeroflot Flight 821	18 February 2019
On 14 September 2008, Aeroflot-Nord Flight 821 crashes into a ravine next to a railway line while on final approach to Perm International Airport in Perm, Russia, in poor weather conditions, killing all 88 people on board. The investigation concluded that the pilots suffered spatial disorientation. Type of aircraft: Boeing 737-500
169	9	"Football Tragedy"	LaMia Flight 2933	4 March 2019
On 28 November 2016, LaMia Flight 2933, carrying the Brazilian Chapecoense soccer squad, runs out of fuel and crashes into the side of a mountain after entering a holding pattern to land at José María Córdova International Airport in Rionegro, Colombia. 71 of the 77 people on board are killed. Type of aircraft: Avro RJ85
170	10	"Slam Dunk"	United Express Flight 6291	11 March 2019
On 7 January 1994, United Express Flight 6291, operating for Atlantic Coast Airlines, crashes 1.2 miles short of the runway during final approach to Port Columbus International Airport after entering a stall. The two pilots, the flight attendant, and two of the five passengers are killed in the crash. Type of aircraft: British Aerospace Jetstream 41

=== Season 20 (2020) ===
No. overall	No. in series	Title	Incident	Original release date
171	1	"Kathmandu Descent"	Pakistan International Airlines Flight 268	23 January 2020
On 28 September 1992, Pakistan International Airlines Flight 268 crashes into a mountainside while on approach to Tribhuvan International Airport in Kathmandu, Nepal, killing all 167 people on board. The pilots had begun the descent too early after misreading the approach chart. Type of aircraft: Airbus A300B4-200
172	2	"Impossible Pitch"	West Air Sweden Flight 294	13 February 2020
On 8 January 2016, West Air Sweden Flight 294 crashes near Lake Akkajaure in Sweden during a cargo flight from Oslo to Tromsø, Norway, killing both crew members. A malfunction in an inertial reference unit produced erroneous attitude indications and mislead the crew into a dive. Type of aircraft: Bombardier CRJ200
173	3	"Explosive Touchdown"	Uni Air Flight 873	9 January 2020
On 24 August 1999, Uni Air Flight 873 suffers an explosion in the cabin while landing at Hualien Airport, killing one passenger. It was determined that bleach bottles filled with gasoline, which were being transported by a passenger on the domestic flight, leaked inside the overhead bins, and were ignited by a nearby motorcycle battery. Type of aircraft: McDonnell Douglas MD-90-30
174	4	"Taxiway Turmoil"	1990 Detroit Metropolitan Airport runway collision	16 January 2020
On 3 December 1990, two Northwest Airlines jets collide in heavy fog at Detroit Metropolitan Wayne County Airport after Flight 1482 mistakenly turns on to an active runway while Flight 299 is taking off. 8 of the 44 people on board Flight 1482 are killed; all 154 people on board Flight 299 survive. Type of aircraft: Flight 1482: McDonnell Douglas DC-9-14; Flight 299: Boeing 727-200 Advanced
175	5	"Runway Breakup"	AIRES Flight 8250	12 March 2020
On 16 August 2010, AIRES Flight 8250 crashes short of the runway while landing at Gustavo Rojas Pinilla International Airport in San Andrés, Colombia, killing 2 of the 131 people on board. A black hole approach illusion had led the pilots to believe the aircraft was higher than it actually was. Type of aircraft: Boeing 737-700
176	6	"Icy Descent"	Sol Líneas Aéreas Flight 5428	30 January 2020
On 18 May 2011, Sol Líneas Aéreas Flight 5428 stalls and crashes in Río Negro en route from Neuquén to Comodoro Rivadavia, Argentina, killing all 22 people on board. The cause of the crash was the pilots' failure to maintain airspeed while flying through severe icing conditions. Type of aircraft: Saab 340A
177	7	"Atlantic Ditching"	Cougar Helicopters Flight 91	6 February 2020
On 12 March 2009, Cougar Helicopters Flight 91 suffers an oil leak in the main gearbox while transporting oil rig workers from St. John's, Newfoundland. The helicopter ditches in the Atlantic Ocean during an attempt to return to land, killing all but one of the 18 people on board. Type of aircraft: Sikorsky S-92A
178	8	"No Warning"	Trigana Air Flight 267	20 February 2020
On 16 August 2015, Trigana Air Flight 267 crashes into a mountainside while nearing its destination of Oksibil Airport in Papua, Indonesia, killing all 54 people on board. The pilots had intentionally deviated from the standard flight path and deactivated the ground proximity warning system. Type of aircraft: ATR 42-300
179	9	"Cockpit Killer"	LAM Mozambique Airlines Flight 470	27 February 2020
On 29 November 2013, LAM Mozambique Airlines Flight 470 enters a rapid descent into Namibia's Bwabwata National Park halfway from Maputo, Mozambique, to Luanda, Angola, killing all 33 people on board. The investigation concluded that the captain deliberately crashed the aircraft. Type of aircraft: Embraer E190
180	10	"Stormy Cockpit"	Kenya Airways Flight 507	5 March 2020
On 5 May 2007, Kenya Airways Flight 507 crashes during a thunderstorm shortly after takeoff from Douala International Airport in Cameroon, killing all 114 people on board. The pilots suffered spatial disorientation after their failure to engage the autopilot resulted in an excessive bank. Type of aircraft: Boeing 737-800

=== Season 21 (2021) ===
No. overall	No. in series	Title	Incident	Original release date
181	1	"North Sea Nightmare"	Loganair Flight 6780	4 April 2021
On 15 December 2014, Loganair Flight 6780 starts an uncontrolled descent while on approach to Sumburgh Airport in Scotland. The pilots regain control and make an emergency landing at Aberdeen, with no fatalities. After a lightning strike, the pilots wrongly assumed the autopilot was disengaged and tried to climb. The conflict caused the autopilot to set the elevator controls into a dive. Type of aircraft: Saab 2000
182	2	"Playing Catch Up"	Execuflight Flight 1526	11 April 2021
On 10 November 2015, Execuflight Flight 1526 enters an aerodynamic stall and crashes into an apartment building and an embankment during final approach to Akron Fulton International Airport in Akron, Ohio. Both crew members and all seven passengers on board are killed in the crash. Type of aircraft: British Aerospace BAe-125
183	3	"Tragic Takeoff"	Comair Flight 5191	18 April 2021
On 27 August 2006, Comair Flight 5191, operating for Delta Connection, crashes into a wooded area while taking off from Blue Grass Airport in Kentucky, killing all but the first officer on board. The pilots lost situational awareness and inadvertently taxied onto the wrong runway. Type of aircraft: Bombardier CRJ-100ER
184	4	"Grounded: Boeing Max 8"	Lion Air Flight 610	5 April 2021
On 29 October 2018, Lion Air Flight 610 enters a nosedive and crashes into the Java Sea shortly after taking off from Soekarno–Hatta International Airport in Jakarta, Indonesia, on a flight to Pangkal Pinang. All 181 passengers and 8 crew members on board are killed in the crash. Type of aircraft: Boeing 737 MAX 8
185	5	"Cabin Catastrophe"	Southwest Airlines Flight 1380	12 April 2021
On 17 April 2018, the left engine of Southwest Airlines Flight 1380 explodes, causing explosive depressurization and forcing the pilots to make an emergency landing at Philadelphia International Airport. A passenger dies after being partially ejected from the aircraft. The investigation traced the engine failure to a fatigue crack in a fan blade. Type of aircraft: Boeing 737-700
186	6	"Meltdown Over Kathmandu"	US-Bangla Airlines Flight 211	26 April 2021
On 12 March 2018, US-Bangla Airlines Flight 211 skids off the runway, travels through the airport perimeter fence, and crashes into a soccer field during landing at Tribhuvan International Airport in Kathmandu, Nepal. 51 of the 71 people on board are killed in the accident. Type of aircraft: Bombardier Dash 8-Q400
187	7	"Mission Disaster"	1991 Gulf War Boeing KC-135 accident	16 May 2021
On 6 February 1991, a military aerial refueling aircraft loses both engines from under the left wing while on a combat mission in Saudi Arabia during the Gulf War, forcing the pilots to make an emergency landing. The accident was attributed to severe wake turbulence from a passing KC-135. Type of aircraft: Boeing KC-135 Stratotanker
188	8	"Caught in a Jam"	Ansett New Zealand Flight 703	23 May 2021
On 9 June 1995, Ansett New Zealand Flight 703 suffers a landing gear malfunction during final approach to Palmerston North Airport in New Zealand. The aircraft descends until it crashes into hilly terrain as the pilots try to resolve the problem. 4 of the 21 people on board are killed. Type of aircraft: de Havilland Canada DHC-8-102
189	9	"Seconds From Touchdown"	Propair Flight 420	30 May 2021
On 18 June 1998, Propair Flight 420 crashes while attempting to conduct an emergency landing at Montréal–Mirabel International Airport after an in-flight fire causes its left wing to fail, killing all 11 people on board. It was later determined that the aircraft's left brakes overheated during takeoff. Type of aircraft: Fairchild Metroliner SA226
190	10	"Deadly Delivery"	UPS Airlines Flight 1354	6 June 2021
On 14 August 2013, UPS Airlines Flight 1354 clips the tops of trees and crashes into a hillside about one nautical mile short of the runway during final approach to Birmingham–Shuttlesworth International Airport in Alabama. Both crew members on board are killed in the crash. Type of aircraft: Airbus A300F4-600R

=== Season 22 (2022) ===
No. overall	No. in series	Title	Incident	Original release date
191	1	"Holding Pattern"	Flydubai Flight 981	17 January 2022
On 19 March 2016, Flydubai Flight 981 enters a rapid descent and crashes nose-first at Rostov-on-Don Airport in Rostov-on-Don, Russia, after aborting its second landing attempt in poor weather conditions. All 55 passengers and 7 crew members on board are killed. Type of aircraft: Boeing 737-800
192	2	"Peril over Portugal"	Martinair Flight 495	24 January 2022
On 21 December 1992, Martinair Flight 495 crashes off the right side of the runway while attempting to land at Faro Airport in Faro, Portugal, in severe weather conditions, killing 56 of the 340 people on board. The accident was caused by microburst-induced wind shear in combination with pilot error. Type of aircraft: McDonnell Douglas DC-10-30CF
193	3	"Stealth Bomber Down"	2008 Andersen Air Force Base B-2 crash	17 January 2022
On 23 February 2008, a stealth bomber of the United States Air Force named the Spirit of Kansas enters a stall and crashes on the runway just moments after takeoff from Andersen Air Force Base in Guam. Both crew members survive after successfully ejecting from the aircraft. Type of aircraft: Northrop Grumman B-2 Spirit
194	4	"Double Trouble"	Trans-Air Service Flight 671	22 January 2022
On 31 March 1992, Trans-Air Service Flight 671 suffers an in-flight separation of its two right engines while en route to Kano, Nigeria, forcing the pilots to make an emergency landing at Istres-Le Tubé Air Base in France. The number three engine detached due to metal fatigue and tore off the number four engine. Type of aircraft: Boeing 707-320C
195	5	"Pacific Plunge"	Alaska Airlines Flight 261	3 January 2022
On 31 January 2000, Alaska Airlines Flight 261's trimmable horizontal stabilizer jams and breaks from its control system during a flight to San Francisco. The aircraft enters a dive and crashes inverted into the Pacific Ocean. All 88 passengers and crew members on board are killed. Note: This accident was previously featured in the episode "Cutting Corners" (S01E05) and as a special in the episode "Fatal Flaw" (S06E02). Type of aircraft: McDonnell Douglas MD-83
196	6	"Terror over Michigan"	TWA Flight 841 (1979)	10 January 2022
On 4 April 1979, Trans World Airlines (TWA) Flight 841 enters a spiral dive while en route to Minnesota. The pilots regain control and make an emergency landing at Detroit, with no fatalities. A leading-edge slat had failed due to the pilots extending the flaps and slats at cruising speed. Type of aircraft: Boeing 727-31
197	7	"Tree Strike Terror"	American Airlines Flight 1572	5 February 2022
On 12 November 1995, American Airlines Flight 1572 clips the tops of trees along Peak Mountain Ridge and strikes instrument landing system equipment on landing at Bradley International Airport in Windsor Locks, Connecticut. All 78 people on board survive, with one passenger sustaining a minor injury. Type of aircraft: McDonnell Douglas MD-83
198	8	"Pitch Black"	Air Illinois Flight 710	5 February 2022
On 11 October 1983, Air Illinois Flight 710 crashes into an open pasture area near Pinckneyville, Illinois, in poor weather while en route to Southern Illinois Airport, killing all 10 people on board. The cause of the crash was the pilots' mismanagement of an electrical problem. Type of aircraft: Hawker Siddeley HS 748
199	9	"Turboprop Terror"	Flagship Airlines Flight 3379	12 February 2022
On 13 December 1994, Flagship Airlines Flight 3379, operating for American Eagle, enters an aerodynamic stall and crashes into a wooded area during a missed approach to Raleigh–Durham International Airport in North Carolina. The 2 pilots and 13 of the 18 passengers are killed. Type of aircraft: Jetstream 32
200	10	"Loss of a Legend"	2020 Calabasas helicopter crash	12 February 2022
On 26 January 2020, a helicopter carrying basketball player Kobe Bryant, his daughter Gianna, and seven other people crashes into hilly terrain near Calabasas, California, killing all 9 people on board. The pilot had violated visual flight rules and suffered spatial disorientation. Type of aircraft: Sikorsky S-76B

=== Season 23 (2023) ===
No. overall	No. in series	Title	Incident	Original release date
201	1	"Deadly Exchange"	Corporate Airlines Flight 5966	3 January 2023
On 19 October 2004, Corporate Airlines Flight 5966, operating for AmericanConnection, crashes short of the runway while on approach to Kirksville Regional Airport in Missouri, killing 13 of the 15 people on board. The pilots had descended below the minimum safe altitude under the effects of fatigue. Type of aircraft: British Aerospace Jetstream 32
202	2	"Mixed Signals"	Independent Air Flight 1851	10 January 2023
On 8 February 1989, Independent Air Flight 1851 crashes into the Pico Alto mountain while on approach to Santa Maria Airport in the Azores, killing all 144 occupants. The crash was caused by the pilots' non-observance to established operating procedures and wrong data from air traffic control. Type of aircraft: Boeing 707-330B
203	3	"Pressure Point"	Japan Air Lines Flight 123	17 January 2023
On 12 August 1985, Japan Air Lines Flight 123's aft pressure bulkhead bursts open, destroying the vertical stabilizer and severing all 4 of the aircraft's hydraulic systems. The crew keep the aircraft flying for 32 minutes until it crashes into Mount Takamagahara. 520 of the 524 people on board are killed. Note: This accident was previously featured in the episode "Out of Control" (S03E03) and as a special in the episode "Fatal Flaw" (S06E02). Type of aircraft: Boeing 747SR
204	4	"Power Play"	Airlines PNG Flight 1600	24 January 2023
On 13 October 2011, Airlines PNG Flight 1600 loses engine power and crash-lands in a densely forested area near the mouth of the Guabe River in Madang Province, Papua New Guinea. Only 4 of the 32 passengers and crew members on board survive the crash. Type of aircraft: de Havilland Canada DHC-8-102
205	5	"Control Catastrophe"	Air Astana Flight 1388	31 January 2023
On 11 November 2018, Air Astana Flight 1388 makes an emergency landing at Beja Airbase in Portugal after suffering severe flight control issues, with no fatalities. The investigation found that the aileron cables were installed incorrectly, causing a reversal of aileron controls. Type of aircraft: Embraer E190
206	6	"Cockpit Catastrophe"	Sichuan Airlines Flight 8633	7 February 2023
On 14 May 2018, Sichuan Airlines Flight 8633 makes an emergency landing at Chengdu Shuangliu International Airport after suffering an explosion decompression. The co-pilot was partially sucked out, but all 128 people on board survive. The incident was caused by a cockpit windshield failing in-flight. Type of aircraft: Airbus A319-100
207	7	"Dream Flight Disaster"	2017 Sydney Seaplanes DHC-2 crash	14 February 2023
On 31 December 2017, a light aircraft configured as a floatplane veers off course and crashes into Jerusalem Bay off Cowan Creek, on the northern outskirts of Sydney, Australia, shortly after take-off. All 6 people on board, including businessman Richard Cousins, are killed. Type of aircraft: de Havilland Canada DHC-2 Beaver
208	8	"Deadly Deception"	Balkan Bulgarian Airlines Flight 013	21 February 2023
On 7 March 1983, Balkan Bulgarian Airlines Flight 013 is hijacked by four men who demand the aircraft be diverted to Vienna, Austria, but the pilots fly the aircraft over the Black Sea in circles and land at Varna Airport. Commandos arrest three hijackers and kill one who threatens a flight attendant. Type of aircraft: Antonov An-24B
209	9	"Delivery to Disaster"	Atlas Air Flight 3591	28 February 2023
On 23 February 2019, Atlas Air Flight 3591 crashes into Trinity Bay while on final approach to George Bush Intercontinental Airport in Houston, Texas, killing all 3 people on board. The first officer suffered spatial disorientation after inadvertently activating the aircraft's go-around mode. Type of aircraft: Boeing 767-300ER(BCF)
210	10	"Mystery over the Mediterranean"	EgyptAir Flight 804	7 March 2023
On 19 May 2016, EgyptAir Flight 804 suffers an in-flight cockpit fire and crashes into the Mediterranean Sea during a flight from Charles de Gaulle Airport in Paris, France, to Cairo International Airport in Cairo, Egypt. All 66 people on board are killed in the crash. Type of aircraft: Airbus A320-200

=== Season 24 (2024) ===
No. overall	No. in series	Title	Incident	Original release date
211	1	"Terror Over The Pacific"	United Airlines Flight 811	18 February 2024
On 24 February 1989, United Airlines Flight 811's right-side fuselage partially rips off, ejecting nine people from the aircraft and causing an explosive decompression. The flight later lands safely at Honolulu without any more loss of life. It was later determined that an electrical short circuit caused the cargo door to open. Note: This accident was previously featured in the episode "Unlocking Disaster" (S01E01) and as a special in the episode "Ripped Apart" (S06E01). Type of aircraft: Boeing 747-100
212	2	"Disaster at Dutch Harbor"	PenAir Flight 3296	24 March 2024
On 17 October 2019, PenAir Flight 3296 overruns the runway on landing at Unalaska Airport in the Aleutian Chain of Alaska, killing one passenger. The accident was caused by incorrect wiring of the wheel speed transducer harnesses on the left main landing gear. Type of aircraft: Saab 2000
213	3	"Deadly Departure"	Air Transport International Flight 782	7 April 2024
On 16 February 1995, Air Transport International Flight 782 crashes into the ground after failing to takeoff from Kansas City International Airport in Missouri, killing all 3 pilots. The flight crew failed to understand a three-engine takeoff procedure due to improper training. Type of aircraft: Douglas DC-8-63F
214	4	"Without Warning"	2019 Alaska mid-air collision	10 March 2024
On 13 May 2019, a floatplane operated by Mountain Air Service collides with another floatplane operated by Taquan Air over George Inlet in Alaska, United States. All five people on board the Beaver and one passenger on board the Otter are killed in the accident. Type of aircraft: N952DB: de Havilland Canada DHC-2 Beaver; N959PA: de Havilland Canada DHC-3 Turbine Otter
215	5	"Eleven Deadly Seconds"	China Airlines Flight 676	14 April 2024
On 16 February 1998, China Airlines Flight 676 attempts a go-around while on approach to Chiang Kai-shek International Airport in poor weather conditions, but crashes into a residential area after entering a stall. All 196 people on board and 6 people on the ground are killed. Type of aircraft: Airbus A300B4-600R
216	6	"Fight for Survival"	Pilgrim Airlines Flight 458	3 March 2024
On 21 February 1982, Pilgrim Airlines Flight 458 crash-lands on the ice of the frozen Scituate Reservoir near Providence, Rhode Island, after a fire erupts in the cockpit, killing one passenger. The cause of the fire was a leakage of flammable windshield washer/deicer fluid. Type of aircraft: de Havilland Canada DHC-6 Twin Otter
217	7	"Pitch Battle"	Colgan Air Flight 9446	31 March 2024
On 26 August 2003, Colgan Air Flight 9446 crashes into water shortly after takeoff from Barnstable Municipal Airport, killing both pilots. The causes of the crash were an improper replacement of the forward elevator trim cable and the pilots not following checklist procedures. Type of aircraft: Beechcraft 1900D
218	8	"Under Fire"	Saudia Flight 163	17 March 2024
On 19 August 1980, Saudia Flight 163 suffers an in-flight fire in the cargo hold. Despite returning to Riyadh International Airport, the flight crew fail to perform an emergency evacuation, and the aircraft bursts into flames on a taxiway. All 301 people on board die from smoke inhalation. Type of aircraft: Lockheed L-1011 TriStar 200
219	9	"Lost Star Footballer"	2019 English Channel Piper PA-46 crash	14 February 2024
On 21 January 2019, a light aircraft breaks up in mid-air and crashes into the English Channel off Alderney in the Channel Islands during a flight from Nantes, France, to Cardiff, Wales. Argentine soccer player Emiliano Sala and pilot David Ibbotson are both killed. Type of aircraft: Piper PA-46 Malibu
220	10	"Deadly Directive"	Ethiopian Airlines Flight 302	11 February 2024
On 10 March 2019, Ethiopian Airlines Flight 302 crashes near the town of Bishoftu shortly after takeoff from Addis Ababa Bole International Airport, killing all 157 people on board. A faulty angle of attack sensor had accidentally activated the aircraft's MCAS system. Type of aircraft: Boeing 737 MAX 8

=== Season 25 (2025) ===
No. overall	No. in series	Title	Incident	Original release date
221	1	"Pacific Ditching"	Transair Flight 810	16 March 2025
On 2 July 2021, Transair Flight 810 ditches in Māmala Bay about 11 minutes into a flight from Honolulu, Hawaii, to Kahului, Maui. However, both crew members survive. It was determined that the pilots inadvertently reduced power to the wrong engine during a failure. Type of aircraft: Boeing 737-200C
222	2	"Running on Empty"	Air Tahoma Flight 185	6 April 2025
On 13 August 2004, Air Tahoma Flight 185 crashes into a golf course in Florence, Kentucky, after suffering a fuel starvation. The first officer is killed, but the captain survives with minor injuries. The investigation found that the pilots did not follow the fuel crossfeed procedures. Type of aircraft: Convair CV-580
223	3	"Power Struggle"	Sriwijaya Air Flight 182	9 February 2025
On 9 January 2021, Sriwijaya Air Flight 182 crashes into the Java Sea five minutes after takeoff from Soekarno–Hatta International Airport, killing all 62 people on board. The crash was caused by the pilots improperly reacting to an autothrottle malfunction. Type of aircraft: Boeing 737-500
224	4	"Second Thoughts"	Luxair Flight 9642	2 March 2025
On 6 November 2002, the pilots of Luxair Flight 9642 accidentally set the propellers into reverse pitch while attempting to land at Luxembourg Findel Airport in heavy fog. The aircraft loses control and crashes into a field short of the airport. 20 of the 22 people on board are killed. Type of aircraft: Fokker 50
225	5	"Powerless Plunge"	Loganair Flight 670A	23 February 2025
On 27 February 2001, both engines on Loganair Flight 670A flame out shortly after takeoff from Edinburgh Airport. The aircraft later ditches in the Firth of Forth, killing both of the pilots. It was later determined that large amounts of snow had entered the engine air intakes. Type of aircraft: Short 360-100
226	6	"Cabin Chaos"	China Eastern Airlines Flight 583	2 February 2025
On 6 April 1993, a crew member accidentally deploys the slats on China Eastern Airlines Flight 583 over the Pacific Ocean, causing severe oscillations. The aircraft later lands safely at Shemya Air Force Base in Alaska. Two passengers die from their injuries. Type of aircraft: McDonnell Douglas MD-11
227	7	"Deadly Climb"	Midwest Express Airlines Flight 105	9 March 2025
On 6 September 1985, the right engine of Midwest Express Airlines Flight 105 explodes shortly after takeoff from General Mitchell International Airport. The aircraft banks to the right and crashes into an open field in Oak Creek. All 31 people on board are killed. Type of aircraft: McDonnell Douglas DC-9-14
228	8	"Firebomber Down"	2020 Coulson Aviation Lockheed EC-130 crash	16 February 2025
On 23 January 2020, an airtanker operated by Coulson Aviation crashes into terrain while aerial firefighting for the New South Wales Rural Fire Service during Australia's black summer bushfires. All three crew members on board are killed in the crash. Type of aircraft: Lockheed EC-130Q Hercules
229	9	"Collision Catastrophe"	2002 Überlingen mid-air collision	23 March 2025
On 1 July 2002, BAL Bashkirian Airlines Flight 2937 collides with DHL International Aviation ME Flight 611 in German airspace near Überlingen, killing all 71 people on board the two aircraft. The crew of Flight 611 followed the on-board traffic collision avoidance system (TCAS) instructions to initiate a descent. However, the crew of Flight 2937 followed the instructions of the air traffic controller instead of their TCAS and initiated a descent as well. Note: This accident was previously featured in the episode "Deadly Crossroads" (S02E04) and as a special in the episode "System Breakdown" (S08E01). Type of aircraft: Flight 2937: Tupolev Tu-154M; Flight 611: Boeing 757-200PF
230	10	"Fatal Test Flight"	Airborne Express Flight 827	30 March 2025
On 22 December 1996, Airborne Express Flight 827 stalls and crashes into mountainous terrain near Narrows, Virginia, during a post-modification functional evaluation flight, killing all six occupants. The investigation found that the pilots made improper flight control inputs. Type of aircraft: Douglas DC-8-63F
231	11	"No Exit"	1991 Los Angeles runway collision	26 May 2025
On 1 February 1991, USAir Flight 1493 collides with SkyWest Airlines Flight 5569 on the runway at Los Angeles International Airport, killing 35 people. An air traffic controller mistakenly assigned Flight 1493 to land on a runway where the SkyWest Airlines aircraft was waiting to take off. Note: This accident was previously featured in the episode "Cleared for Disaster" (S09E04), and the episode is a "Surviving Disaster" special. Type of aircraft: Flight 1493: Boeing 737-300; Flight 5569: Fairchild Metro III

=== Season 26 (2026) ===
No. overall	No. in series	Title	Incident	Original release date
232	1	"Deadly Charter"	2001 Avjet Gulfstream III crash	20 January 2026
On 29 March 2001, a chartered business jet operated by Avjet crashes into a hillside while on final approach to Aspen/Pitkin County Airport in Colorado, killing all 18 people on board. The cause of the accident was the pilots' premature descent below the minimum descent altitude. Type of aircraft: Gulfstream III
233	2	"Norwegian Nightmare"	Widerøe Flight 839	27 January 2026
On 12 April 1990, Widerøe Flight 839 crashes into the water shortly after takeoff from Værøy Airport in Norway, killing all five people on board. The investigation determined that the aircraft suffered a structural failure due to strong winds that exceeded its design criteria. Type of aircraft: de Havilland Canada DHC-6 Twin Otter
234	3	"A Perfect Storm"	Nürnberger Flugdienst Flight 108	3 February 2026
On 8 February 1988, Nürnberger Flugdienst Flight 108 breaks up in mid-air and crashes near Kettwig, Germany, while on approach to Düsseldorf Airport, killing all 21 people on board. The pilots suffered spatial disorientation after a lightning strike caused a total electrical failure. Type of aircraft: Swearingen SA-227AC Metroliner III
235	4	"Crash Landing"	Eagle Airways Flight 2300	10 February 2026
On 18 June 2007, the landing gear of Eagle Airways Flight 2300 fails to extend while on approach to Wellington. The pilots divert the aircraft and make a belly landing at Blenheim, saving all 17 people on board. The landing gear failed due to a fatigue crack in the hydraulic actuator. Type of aircraft: Beechcraft 1900D
236	5	"Peril Over Pakistan"	Airblue Flight 202	17 February 2026
On 28 July 2010, Airblue Flight 202 crashes into the Margalla Hills while attempting to land at Benazir Bhutto International Airport in poor weather conditions, killing all 152 people on board. The crash was caused by the pilots' errors in judgement and lack of professionalism. Type of aircraft: Airbus A321-200
237	6	"Deadly Cover Up"	Aeroperú Flight 603	24 February 2026
On 2 October 1996, shortly after take off, the crew of Aeroperú Flight 603 are confused by false speed and altitude readings and contradictory warnings from the aircraft's air data system. In preparation for an emergency landing, the crew descend the aircraft, but unknowingly descend too far by relying on the false readings. The aircraft crashes into the Pacific Ocean, killing all 70 people on board. The false readings and contradictory warnings were caused by duct tape over the static ports, which was used to protect the ports during maintenance, but was not removed afterwards. Note: This accident was previously featured in the episode "Flying Blind" (S01E04) and as a special in the episode "Who's Flying the Plane?" (S06E03). Type of aircraft: Boeing 757-200
238	7	"Divided in Crisis"	Air Algérie Flight 6289	3 March 2026
On 6 March 2003, the left engine of Air Algérie Flight 6289 fails during takeoff from Aguenar – Hadj Bey Akhamok Airport in Tamanrasset, Algeria. The aircraft enters a stall and crashes into a desert near the Trans-Sahara Highway, killing all but 1 of the 103 occupants on board. Type of aircraft: Boeing 737-200
239	8	"Moments from Touchdown"	Yeti Airlines Flight 691	10 March 2026
On 15 January 2023, Yeti Airlines Flight 691 stalls and crashes into a gorge near the Seti Gandaki River during final approach to Pokhara International Airport, killing all 72 people on board. It was later determined that the pilots accidentally feathered the aircraft's propellers. Type of aircraft: ATR 72-500
240	9	"Monsoon Approach"	Air India Express Flight 1344	17 March 2026
On 7 August 2020, Air India Express Flight 1344 plunges down a gorge after overrunning the runway at Calicut International Airport in poor weather, killing 21 of the 190 people on board. The captain continued the unstabilized approach and landed too far down the runway. Type of aircraft: Boeing 737-800
241	10	"Mixed Measures"	Korean Air Cargo Flight 6316	24 March 2026
On 15 April 1999, Korean Air Cargo Flight 6316 crashes into an industrial zone shortly after takeoff from Shanghai, China, killing all 3 crew members on board and 5 people on the ground. The pilots lost altitude situational awareness and made abrupt flight control inputs. Type of aircraft: McDonnell Douglas MD-11F

== The Accident Files ==
Seasons	Episodes	Originally released	
Seasons	Episodes	First released	Last released
1	10	9 July 2018	10 September 2018
2	10	5 June 2019	7 August 2019
3	10	3 September 2020	5 November 2020
4	10	11 January 2021	15 March 2021
5	10	3 July 2022	4 September 2022
6	6	8 July 2024	12 August 2024

=== Season 1 (2018) ===
No. overall	No. in series	Title	Incident	Original release date
1	1	"Communication Breakdown"	United Express Flight 5925; Garuda Indonesia Flight 152; Tenerife airport disaster	9 July 2018
This special looked at how failures in communication lead to disasters. Types of aircraft: Flight 5925: Beechcraft 1900C; light aircraft: Beechcraft 65-A90 King Air; Flight 152: Airbus A300B4-200; Flight 1736: Boeing 747-100; Flight 4805: Boeing 747-200B
2	2	"Bad Attitude"	British European Airways Flight 548; Northwest Airlink Flight 5719; Trans-Colorado Airlines Flight 2286	16 July 2018
This special looked at how pilots' aggressive or unprofessional behaviour can cause accidents. Types of aircraft: Flight 548: Hawker Siddeley Trident 1C; Flight 5719: Jetstream 31; Flight 2286: Fairchild Swearingen Metroliner
3	3	"Hero Pilots"	US Airways Flight 1549; Gimli Glider; TACA Flight 110	23 July 2018
This special looked at how pilots safely land their aircraft in emergency situations. Types of aircraft: Flight 1549: Airbus A320-200; Flight 143: Boeing 767-200; Flight 110: Boeing 737-300
4	4	"Plane vs. Pilot"	Air France Flight 296Q; XL Airways Germany Flight 888T; Air France Flight 447	30 July 2018
This special looked at how automation in the cockpit causes deadly misunderstandings. Types of aircraft: Flight 296Q: Airbus A320-100; Flight 888T: Airbus A320-200; Flight 447: Airbus A330-200
5	5	"Explosive Evidence"	Metrojet Flight 9268; Korean Air Lines Flight 007; Malaysia Airlines Flight 17	6 August 2018
This special looked at terrorist acts, including bombings and shootdowns. Types of aircraft: Flight 9268: Airbus A321-200; Flight 007: Boeing 747-200B; Flight 17: Boeing 777-200ER
6	6	"Killer in the Cockpit?"	SilkAir Flight 185; Germanwings Flight 9525; Malaysia Airlines Flight 370	13 August 2018
This special looked at pilots' carefully planned strategies in deliberately crashing aircraft. Types of aircraft: Flight 185: Boeing 737-300; Flight 9525: Airbus A320-200; Flight 370: Boeing 777-200ER
7	7	"Missing Pieces"	British Airways Flight 38; ValuJet Flight 592; Pan Am Flight 103	20 August 2018
This special looked at foreign items, including ice, a chemical oxygen generator, and a bomb as the cause. Types of aircraft: Flight 38: Boeing 777-200ER; Flight 592: McDonnell Douglas DC-9-32; Flight 103: Boeing 747-100
8	8	"Controversial Crashes"	Munich air disaster Arrow Air Flight 1285R; Smolensk air disaster	27 August 2018
This special looked at disasters where multiple investigations don't agree on the cause. Types of aircraft: Flight 609: Airspeed Ambassador; Flight 1285R: Douglas DC-8-63CF; Flight 101: Tupolev Tu-154M
9	9	"Deadly Distractions"	Delta Air Lines Flight 1141; Eastern Air Lines Flight 401; 2012 Mount Salak Sukhoi Superjet crash	3 September 2018
This special looked at how pilots' deviation from cockpit duties lead to crashes. Types of aircraft: Flight 1141: Boeing 727-200 Advanced; Flight 401: Lockheed L-1011-1 Tristar; Flight 36801: Sukhoi Superjet 100
10	10	"Fire on Board"	1985 Manchester Airport disaster Nigeria Airways Flight 2120; UPS Airlines Flight 6	10 September 2018
This special looked at disasters caused by fires, either on the ground or in the air. Types of aircraft: Flight 28M: Boeing 737-200; Flight 2120: Douglas DC-8-61; Flight 6: Boeing 747-400F

=== Season 2 (2019) ===
No. overall	No. in series	Title	Incident	Original release date
11	1	"Headline News"	American Airlines Flight 77; TWA Flight 800; Air France Flight 4590	5 June 2019
This special looked at some of the most infamous air disasters of all time. Types of aircraft: Flight 77: Boeing 757-200; Flight 800: Boeing 747-100; Flight 4590: Aérospatiale/BAC Concorde
12	2	"Rookie Errors"	LAPA Flight 3142; American Airlines Flight 587; Colgan Air Flight 3407	12 June 2019
This special looked at how pilots' rookie mistakes cause accidents. Types of aircraft: Flight 3142: Boeing 737-200; Flight 587: Airbus A300-600; Flight 3407: Bombardier Q400
13	3	"Collision Course"	Hughes Airwest Flight 706; Pacific Southwest Airlines Flight 182; 1996 Charkhi Dadri mid-air collision	19 June 2019
This special looked at mid-air collisions. Types of aircraft: Flight 706: McDonnell Douglas DC-9-31; USMC jet: McDonnell Douglas F-4 Phantom II; Flight 182: Boeing 727-200; light aircraft: Cessna 172; Flight 763: Boeing 747-100B; Flight 1907: Ilyushin Il-76
14	4	"Engines Out"	Cathay Pacific Flight 780; British Airways Flight 9 China Airlines Flight 006	26 June 2019
This special looked at how engine failures cause near-fatal accidents. Types of aircraft: Flight 780: Airbus A330-300; Flight 9: Boeing 747-200B; Flight 006: Boeing 747SP
15	5	"Fuel Trouble"	United Airlines Flight 173; China Airlines Flight 120; Varig Flight 254	3 July 2019
This special looked at fuel problems caused by either crew mismanagement or mechanical failure. Types of aircraft: Flight 173: Douglas DC-8-61; Flight 120: Boeing 737-800; Flight 254: Boeing 737-200
16	6	"Perilous Payload"	Fine Air Flight 101; Air Midwest Flight 5481; National Airlines Flight 102	10 July 2019
This special looked at disasters caused by improperly distributed weight or secured cargo. Types of aircraft: Flight 101: Douglas DC-8-61F; Flight 5481: Beechcraft 1900D; Flight 102: Boeing 747-400F
17	7	"Runway in Sight"	Garuda Indonesia Flight 200; Delta Air Lines Flight 191; Asiana Airlines Flight 214	17 July 2019
This special looked at how poorly prepared pilots cause aircraft to crash during landing. Types of aircraft: Flight 200: Boeing 737-400; Flight 191: Lockheed L-1011-1 Tristar; Flight 214: Boeing 777-200ER
18	8	"Deadly Confusion"	1999 Martha's Vineyard plane crash Flash Airlines Flight 604; Adam Air Flight 574	24 July 2019
This special looked at how spatially disoriented pilots cause crashes. Types of aircraft: JFK Jr's light aircraft: Piper PA-32R-301 Saratoga II; Flight 604: Boeing 737-300; Flight 574: Boeing 737-400
19	9	"Radio Silence"	Helios Airways Flight 522; China Airlines Flight 611; 1999 South Dakota Learjet crash	31 July 2019
This special looked at accidents caused by either a loss of pressurization or structural failure. Types of aircraft: Flight 522: Boeing 737-300; Flight 611: Boeing 747-200B; N47BA: Learjet 35
20	10	"Design Flaws"	Lauda Air Flight 004; Turkish Airlines Flight 981; Atlantic Southeast Airlines Flight 2311	7 August 2019
This special looked at how poor aircraft designs cause disasters. Types of aircraft: Flight 004: Boeing 767-300ER; Flight 981: McDonnell Douglas DC-10-10; Flight 2311: Embraer EMB 120 Brasilia

=== Season 3 (2020) ===
No. overall	No. in series	Title	Incident	Original release date
21	1	"Heat of the Moment"	TransAsia Airways Flight 235; KLM Cityhopper Flight 433; VSS Enterprise crash	1 October 2020
This special looked at how split-second decisions lead to disasters. Types of aircraft: Flight 235: ATR 72-600; Flight 433: Saab 340B; VSS Enterprise: Scaled Composites Model 339 SpaceShipTwo
22	2	"Instrument Confusion"	Copa Airlines Flight 201; Korean Air Cargo Flight 8509; Aeroflot Flight 821	5 November 2020
This special looked at accidents caused by instrument failure or confusion. Types of aircraft: Flight 201: Boeing 737-200 Advanced; Flight 8509: Boeing 747-200F; Flight 821: Boeing 737-500
23	3	"VIP on Board"	1961 Ndola Transair Sweden DC-6 crash LaMia Flight 2933; 1996 United States Air Force Boeing T-43 crash	8 October 2020
This special looked at disasters involving high-profile passengers. Types of aircraft: SE-BDY: Douglas DC-6B; Flight 2933: Avro RJ85; Flight 21: Boeing CT-43
24	4	"Lapse in Security"	Pacific Southwest Airlines Flight 1771; Air India Flight 182; Uni Air Flight 873	24 September 2020
This special looked at how prohibited items got past airport security. Types of aircraft: Flight 1771: British Aerospace 146; Flight 182: Boeing 747-200B; Flight 873: McDonnell Douglas MD-90-30
25	5	"Mountain Impact"	Thai Airways International Flight 311; Air China Flight 129; Air Inter Flight 148	15 October 2020
This special looked at accidents involving controlled flight into terrain. Types of aircraft: Flight 311: Airbus A310-300; Flight 129: Boeing 767-200ER; Flight 148: Airbus A320-100
26	6	"Survivors"	Southern Airways Flight 242; Continental Airlines Flight 1404; Korean Air Flight 801	17 September 2020
This special looked at stories from survivors of accidents. Types of aircraft: Flight 242: McDonnell Douglas DC-9-31; Flight 1404: Boeing 737-500; Flight 801: Boeing 747-300
27	7	"Death from Above"	2011 Reno Air Races crash 2008 Mexico City Learjet crash Aeroméxico Flight 498	10 September 2020
This special looked at aircraft crashing into populated areas. Types of aircraft: The Galloping Ghost: North American P-51 Mustang; XC-VMC: Learjet 45; Flight 498: McDonnell Douglas DC-9-32; light aircraft: Piper PA-28-181 Archer
28	8	"Courage in the Cockpit"	United Airlines Flight 232; Qantas Flight 32; Northwest Airlines Flight 85	3 September 2020
This special looked at how pilots managed to fly after system failures. Types of aircraft: Flight 232: McDonnell Douglas DC-10-10; Flight 32: Airbus A380-800; Flight 85: Boeing 747-400
29	9	"Maintenance Mistakes"	Continental Express Flight 2574; Emery Worldwide Airlines Flight 17; Partnair Flight 394	29 October 2020
This special looked at accidents caused by maintenance errors. Types of aircraft: Flight 2574: Embraer EMB 120 Brasilia; Flight 17: Douglas DC-8-71F; Flight 394: Convair CV-580
30	10	"Take Off Tragedies"	Singapore Airlines Flight 006; Northwest Airlines Flight 255; Spanair Flight 5022	22 October 2020
This special looked at how missteps during takeoff cause accidents. Types of aircraft: Flight 006: Boeing 747-400; Flight 255: McDonnell Douglas MD-82; Flight 5022: McDonnell Douglas MD-82

=== Season 4 (2021) ===
No. overall	No. in series	Title	Incident	Original release date
31	1	"Dead of Night"	AIRES Flight 8250; Ethiopian Airlines Flight 409; West Air Sweden Flight 294	15 February 2021
This special looked at disasters where darkness played a role. Types of aircraft: Flight 8250: Boeing 737-700; Flight 409: Boeing 737-800; Flight 294: Bombardier CRJ200
32	2	"Engine Gone"	American Airlines Flight 191; Reeve Aleutian Airways Flight 8 El Al Flight 1862	11 January 2021
This special looked at accidents caused by engine separations. Types of aircraft: Flight 191: McDonnell Douglas DC-10-10; Flight 8: Lockheed L-188 Electra; Flight 1862: Boeing 747-200F
33	3	"Lethal Choices"	Kegworth air disaster TAM Transportes Aéreos Regionais Flight 402; Indonesia AirAsia Flight 8501	8 February 2021
This special looked at disasters caused by pilots' improper life-and-death decisions. Types of aircraft: Flight 092: Boeing 737-400; Flight 402: Fokker 100; Flight 8501: Airbus A320-200
34	4	"Risky Runways"	TAM Airlines Flight 3054; Pakistan International Airlines Flight 268; Atlantic Airways Flight 670	1 February 2021
This special looked at some of the most challenging landings of all time. Types of aircraft: Flight 3054: Airbus A320-200; Flight 268: Airbus A300B4-200; Flight 670: British Aerospace 146-200A
35	5	"Landings Gone Wrong"	Crossair Flight 3597; Trigana Air Flight 267; TransAsia Airways Flight 222	1 March 2021
This special looked at how pilots' improvisation cause aircraft to crash during approach. Types of aircraft: Flight 3597: British Aerospace 146; Flight 267: ATR 42-300; Flight 222: ATR 72-500
36	6	"Frozen Wings"	Air Florida Flight 90; Comair Flight 3272; Sol Líneas Aéreas Flight 5428	8 March 2021
This special looked at accidents caused by icing. Types of aircraft: Flight 90: Boeing 737-200; Flight 3272: Embraer EMB 120 Brasilia; Flight 5428: Saab 340A
37	7	"Runway Collisions"	1990 Detroit Metropolitan Airport runway collision 1991 Los Angeles runway collision 2001 Linate Airport runway collision	18 January 2021
This special looked at runway incursions. Types of aircraft: Flight 1482: McDonnell Douglas DC-9-14; Flight 299: Boeing 727-200 Advanced; Flight 1493: Boeing 737-300; Flight 5569: Fairchild Metro III; Flight 686: McDonnell Douglas MD-87; business jet: Cessna Citation CJ2
38	8	"Cockpit Breakdown"	Kenya Airways Flight 507; Crossair Flight 498; United Express Flight 6291	22 February 2021
This special looked at accidents caused by mismatched pilots. Types of aircraft: Flight 507: Boeing 737-800; Flight 498: Saab 340B; Flight 6291: British Aerospace Jetstream 41
39	9	"Splash Down"	Garuda Indonesia Flight 421; Cougar Helicopters Flight 91; Tuninter Flight 1153	15 March 2021
This special looked at aircraft ditching in the water. Types of aircraft: Flight 421: Boeing 737-300; Flight 91: Sikorsky S-92A; Flight 1153: ATR 72-200
40	10	"Northern Extremes"	Air Ontario Flight 1363; Scandinavian Airlines System Flight 751; First Air Flight 6560	25 January 2021
This special looked at aircraft crashing in the far North. Types of aircraft: Flight 1363: Fokker F28-1000; Flight 751: McDonnell Douglas MD-81; Flight 6560: Boeing 737-200C

=== Season 5 (2022) ===
No. overall	No. in series	Title	Incident	Original release date
41	1	"War Zone"	1975 Tân Sơn Nhứt C-5 accident Iran Air Flight 655; 2003 Baghdad DHL attempted shootdown incident	3 July 2022
This special looked at disasters over enemy territory. Types of aircraft: 68-0218: Lockheed C-5A Galaxy; Flight 655: Airbus A300B2-200; OO-DLL: Airbus A300B4-200F
42	2	"Time Critical"	Turkish Airlines Flight 1951; Continental Airlines Flight 1713; Ansett New Zealand Flight 703	10 July 2022
This special looked at accidents caused by pilots rushing through procedures. Types of aircraft: Flight 1951: Boeing 737-800; Flight 1713: McDonnell Douglas DC-9-14; Flight 703: de Havilland Canada DHC-8-102
43	3	"Ticking Time Bomb"	Air Moorea Flight 1121; Japan Air Lines Flight 123; Chalk's Ocean Airways Flight 101	17 July 2022
This special looked at disasters caused by deteriorating aircraft parts. Types of aircraft: Flight 1121: de Havilland Canada DHC-6 Twin Otter; Flight 123: Boeing 747SR; Flight 101: Grumman G-73T Turbine Mallard
44	4	"Accidents in the Air"	1956 Grand Canyon mid-air collision Proteus Airlines Flight 706; Gol Transportes Aéreos Flight 1907	24 July 2022
This special looked at mid-air collisions caused by either pilot error or meltdowns within air traffic control. Types of aircraft: Flight 718: Douglas DC-7; Flight 2: Lockheed L-1049 Super Constellation; Flight 706: Beechcraft 1900D; light aircraft: Cessna 177 Cardinal; Flight 1907: Boeing 737-800; business jet: Embraer Legacy 600
45	5	"Impossible Landings"	Southwest Airlines Flight 1380; Aloha Airlines Flight 243; Air Canada Flight 797	31 July 2022
This special looked at how pilots manage to land their aircraft with zero room for error. Types of aircraft: Flight 1380: Boeing 737-700; Flight 243: Boeing 737-200; Flight 797: McDonnell Douglas DC-9-32
46	6	"Trained to Fail"	West Caribbean Airways Flight 708; Loganair Flight 6780; Lokomotiv Yaroslavl plane crash	7 August 2022
This special looked at accidents caused by poor pilot training. Types of aircraft: Flight 708: McDonnell Douglas MD-82; Flight 6780: Saab 2000; Flight 9633: Yakovlev Yak-42D
47	7	"Deadly Data"	Alitalia Flight 404; Qantas Flight 72; Santa Barbara Airlines Flight 518	14 August 2022
This special looked at incidents caused by computer errors. Types of aircraft: Flight 404: McDonnell Douglas DC-9-32; Flight 72: Airbus A330-300: Flight 518: ATR 42-300
48	8	"Poor Piloting"	China Airlines Flight 140; Manx2 Flight 7100; Aeroflot Flight 593	21 August 2022
This special looked at accidents caused by errors in the cockpit. Types of aircraft: Flight 140: Airbus A300B4-600R; Flight 7100: Fairchild SA227-BC Metro III; Flight 593: Airbus A310-300
49	9	"Dangerous Winds"	USAir Flight 1016; TANS Perú Flight 204; 1989 Hurricane Hunters NOAA 42 incident	28 August 2022
This special looked at disasters where strong winds played a role. Types of aircraft: Flight 1016: McDonnell Douglas DC-9-31; Flight 204: Boeing 737-200 Advanced; NOAA42: Lockheed WP-3D Orion
50	10	"Sabotage"	Ethiopian Airlines Flight 961; Itavia Flight 870; LAM Mozambique Airlines Flight 470	4 September 2022
This special looked at aircraft that were brought down by acts of sabotage. Types of aircraft: Flight 961: Boeing 767-200ER; Flight 870: McDonnell Douglas DC-9-15; Flight 470: Embraer E190

=== Season 6 (2024) ===
No. overall	No. in series	Title	Incident	Original release date
51	1	"Pitch Problems"	Alaska Airlines Flight 261; American Eagle Flight 4184; United Airlines Flight 585; USAir Flight 427; Eastwind Airlines Flight 517	8 July 2024
This special looked at accidents caused by pitch issues. Types of aircraft: Flight 261: McDonnell Douglas MD-83; Flight 4184: ATR 72-200; Flight 585: Boeing 737-200; Flight 427: Boeing 737-300; Flight 517: Boeing 737-200
52	2	"Fight to the Finish"	Trans-Air Service Flight 671; Air Astana Flight 1388; Philippine Airlines Flight 434	15 July 2024
This special looked at incidents where pilots face impossible odds. Types of aircraft: Flight 671: Boeing 707-320C; Flight 1388: Embraer E190; Flight 434: Boeing 747-200B
53	3	"Bad Data"	2008 Andersen Air Force Base B-2 accident Independent Air Flight 1851; Birgenair Flight 301	22 July 2024
This special looked at disasters caused by faulty data. Types of aircraft: Spirit of Kansas: Northrop Grumman B-2 Spirit; Flight 1851: Boeing 707-330B; Flight 301: Boeing 757-200
54	4	"Landing Hazards"	Martinair Flight 495; American Airlines Flight 1572; Air France Flight 358	29 July 2024
This special looked at the threat bad weather poses to landings. Types of aircraft: Flight 495: McDonnell Douglas DC-10-30CF; Flight 1572: McDonnell Douglas MD-83; Flight 358: Airbus A340-300
55	5	"Training Ignored"	2020 Calabasas helicopter crash Corporate Airlines Flight 5966; Comair Flight 5191	5 August 2024
This special looked at accidents caused by pilots ignoring their training. Types of aircraft: N72EX: Sikorsky S-76B; Flight 5966: British Aerospace Jetstream 32: Flight 5191: Bombardier CRJ-100ER
56	6	"Reckless Approaches"	Execuflight Flight 1526; Flagship Airlines Flight 3379; American International Airways Flight 808	12 August 2024
This special looked at careless approaches. Types of aircraft: Flight 1526: British Aerospace BAe-125; Flight 3379: Jetstream 32; Flight 808: Douglas DC-8-61F

== Alternate titles ==
The following table lists the alternative titles used by broadcasters for Mayday, the original Canadian series; Air Crash Investigation, the British and Asia-Pacific (National Geographic Channel) versions; and Air Emergency and Air Disasters (Smithsonian Channel), the American versions of the series. The American column also shows the Smithsonian Channel's season and episode numbers, which differ significantly from the official season and episode number designations by Cineflix. Episodes are ordered by their production number, and special episodes and spin-offs are italicized.

Country	Canada	United Kingdom	Australia / Asia	United States	
No.	Title	Title	Title	Title	S.Ep
Season 1 (2003)
1	Unlocking Disaster	Unlocking Disaster	Unlocking Disaster	Unlocking Disaster	S18.E07
2	Racing the Storm	Racing the Storm	Racing the Storm	Racing the Storm	S18.E08
3	Fire on Board	Fire on Board	Fire on Board	Fire in the Sky (Note: Included in Air Disasters under the original Canadian title)	S18.E09
4	Flying Blind	Flying Blind	Flying Blind	Flying Blind	S18.E10
5	Cutting Corners	Cutting Corners	Cutting Corners	Cutting Corners	S18.E11
6	Flying on Empty	Flying on Empty	Flying on Empty	Flying on Empty	S18.E12
Season 2 (2004–2005)
1	Blow Out	Blow Out	Blow Out	Blow Out	S18.E13
2	A Wounded Bird	A Wounded Bird	A Wounded Bird	A Wounded Bird	S18.E14
3	The Killing Machine	Hijacked	Hijacked	A Killing Machine	S18.E15
4	Deadly Crossroads	Mid-Air Collision	Mid-Air Collision	Deadly Crossroads	S18.E16
5	Lost	Crash on the Mountain	Crash on the Mountain	Lost	S18.E17
6	Missing Over New York	Deadly Delay	Deadly Delay	Missing Over New York	S18.E18
Season 3 (2005–2006)
1	Hanging by a Thread	Hanging by a Thread	Hanging by a Thread	Hanging by a Thread	S06.E01
2	Attack over Baghdad	Attack over Baghdad	Attack over Baghdad	Attack over Baghdad	S06.E02
3	Out of Control	Out of Control	Out of Control	Out of Control	S06.E03
4	Fight for Your Life	Suicide Attack	Suicide Attack	Fight for Your Life	S06.E04
5	Bomb on Board	Bomb on Board	Bomb on Board	Bomb on Board	S06.E05
6	Mistaken Identity	Mistaken Identity	Mistaken Identity	Mistaken Identity	S06.E06
7	Helicopter Down	Helicopter Down	Helicopter Down	Helicopter Down	S06.E07
8	Death and Denial	EgyptAir 990	EgyptAir 990	Death and Denial	S06.E08
9	Runaway Train (Note: Crash Scene Investigation episode)	Runaway Train	Runaway Train	Runaway Train	S18.E19
10	Kid in the Cockpit	Kid in the Cockpit	Kid in the Cockpit	Kid in the Cockpit	S06.E09
11	Collision Course	Greek Ferry Disaster	Greek Ferry Disaster	Collision Course	S18.E20
12	Head On Collision	Train Collision	Train Collision	Head-On Collision	S18.E21
13	Ocean Landing	African Hijack	African Hijack	Ocean Landing	S06.E10
Season 4 (2007)
1	Desperate Escape	Miracle Escape	Miracle Escape	Miracle Escape	S07.E01
2	Falling from the Sky	All Engines Failed!	Falling from the Sky	Falling from the Sky	S07.E02
3	Fire Fight	Fire Fight	Fire Fight	Fiery Landing	S07.E03
4	Final Approach	Blind Landing	Missed Approach	Missed Approach	S07.E04
5	Hidden Danger	Hidden Danger	Hidden Danger	Mystery Crashes	S07.E05
6	Panic over the Pacific	Six-Mile Plunge	Panic over the Pacific	Panic over the Pacific	S07.E06
7	Out of Sight	Collision Over LA	Out of Sight	Out of Sight	S07.E07
8	Fog of War	Flight 21 is Missing	Inbound	Crash in Croatia	S07.E08
9	Vertigo	Desperate Dive	Desperate Dive	Deadly Disorientation	S07.E09
10	Ghost Plane	Ghost Plane	Ghost Plane	Unconscious Pilot	S07.E10
Season 5 (2008)
1	Invisible Killer	Slammed to the Ground	Slammed to the Ground	Invisible Killer	S01E01
2	Gimli Glider	Deadly Glide	Miracle Flight	Gimli Glider	S01E02
3	Behind Closed Doors	Behind Closed Doors	Behind Closed Doors	Behind Closed Doors	S01E03
4	Fanning the Flames	Cargo Conspiracy	Mystery Fire	Fanning the Flames	S01E04
5	Dead Weight	Dead Weight	Dead Weight	Dead Weight	S01E05
6	Southern Storm	Southern Storm	Southern Storm	Southern Storm	S01E06
7	Air India: Explosive Evidence	Explosive Evidence	Explosive Evidence	Explosive Evidence	S01E07
8	Mixed Signals	The Plane That Wouldn't Talk	The Plane That Wouldn't Talk	Mixed Signals	S01E08
9	Fatal Distraction	Who's at the Controls?	Fatal Distraction	Fatal Distraction	S01E09
10	Phantom Strike	Radio Silence	Phantom Strike	Death over the Amazon	S01E10
Season 6 (2007–2008) (Science of Disaster)
1	Ripped Apart (Note: Science of Disaster episode)	Ripped Apart	Ripped Apart	Ripped Apart	S18.E22
2	Fatal Flaw	Fatal Fix	Fatal Fix	Fatal Flaw	S18.E23
3	Who's Flying the Plane?	Who's Flying the Plane?	Who's Flying the Plane?	Who's Flying the Plane?	S18.E24
Season 7 (2009–2010)
1	Scratching the Surface	Shattered in Seconds	Shattered in Seconds	Scratching the Surface	S21.E01
2	Lockerbie Disaster	Lockerbie	Lockerbie	Lockerbie Disaster	S21.E02
3	Blown Apart	Deadly Prize	Silent Killer	Blown Apart	S21.E03
4	Sight Unseen	Head-On Collision	Crash Course	Sight Unseen	S21.E04
5	Operation Babylift	Operation Babylift	Operation Babylift	Operation Babylift	S21.E05
6	Falling Fast	Ditch the Plane	Ditch the Plane	Falling Fast	S21.E06
7	Flight 574: Lost	The Plane That Vanished	The Plane That Vanished	Flight 574: Lost	S21.E07
8	Frozen in Flight	Frozen in Flight	Deep Freeze	Deep Freeze	S21.E08
Season 8 (2010) (Science of Disaster)
1	System Breakdown	Communication Breakdown	System Breakdown	System Breakdown	S02.E08
2	Cruel Skies	Cruel Skies	Cruel Skies	Deadly Storms	S02.E03
Season 9 (2010)
1	Panic on the Runway	Manchester Runway Disaster	Panic on the Runway	Panic on the Runway	S02.E04
2	Alarming Silence	Cockpit Chaos	Cockpit Chaos	Alarming Silence	S02.E05
3	Pilot vs. Plane	Pilot vs. Plane	Pilot vs. Plane	Pilot vs. Plane	S02.E07
4	Cleared for Disaster	Cleared for Disaster	Cleared for Disaster	Cleared for Disaster	S02.E10
5	Target Is Destroyed	Target Is Destroyed	Target Is Destroyed	Target Is Destroyed	S02.E02
6	Cold Case	Snowbound	Cold Case	Unwelcome Addition	S02.E06
7	The Final Blow	Crashed and Missing	Doomed to Fail	The Final Blow	S02.E09
8	Cracks in the System	Beach Crash	Miami Mystery	Cracks in the System	S02.E01
Season 10 (2011)
1	Cockpit Failure	Cockpit Failure	Cockpit Failure	Cockpit Failure	S18.E01
2	The Heathrow Enigma	Heathrow Crash Landing	The Heathrow Enigma	The Heathrow Enigma	S18.E02
3	Pilot Betrayed	Pilot Betrayed	Pilot Betrayed	Pilot Betrayed	S18.E03
4	Dead Tired	Stalled in the Sky	Dead Tired	Dead Tired	S18.E04
5	Hudson River Runway	Hudson Splashdown	Hudson River Runway	Hudson River Runway	S18.E05
6	Who's In Control?	Who's In Control?	Who's In Control?	Who's In Control?	S18.E06
Season 11 (2011–2012)
1	Deadly Reputation	Nightmare Runway	Disaster Runway	Deadly Reputation	S02.E12
2	The Plane That Flew Too High	Fatal Climb	The Plane That Flew Too High	The Plane That Flew Too High	S02.E11
3	Split Decision	Military Crash Conspiracy	Split Decision	Split Decision	S03.E10
4	Breakup over Texas	Breakup over Texas	Breakup over Texas	Breakup over Texas	S03.E06
5	Munich Air Disaster	Munich Air Disaster	Munich Air Disaster	Mayday Munich	S03.E02
6	Turning Point	Deadly Design	Turning Point	Turning Point	S03.E05
7	Bad Attitude	Stansted Crash	Bad Attitude	Bad Attitude	S03.E09
8	Blind Spot	On Course to Disaster	Hiding in Plane Sight	Blind Spot	S03.E01
9	Under Pressure	Desert Inferno	Desert Inferno	Under Pressure	S03.E07
10	I'm the Problem	Murder on Board	I'm the Problem	I'm the Problem	S03.E03
11	Nowhere to Land	Miracle Landing	Nowhere to Land	Nowhere to Land	S03.E11
12	The Invisible Plane	Zero Visibility	The Invisible Plane	The Invisible Plane	S03.E08
13	Impossible Landing	Sioux City Fireball	Sioux City Fireball	Impossible Landing	S03.E04
Season 12 (2012–2013)
1	Fight for Control	Fight for Control	Fight for Control	Fight for Control	S04E01
2	Fire in the Hold	Fire in the Hold	Fire in the Hold	Fire in the Hold	S04E02
3	Caution to the Wind	Typhoon Takeoff	Typhoon Takeoff	Caution to the Wind	S04E03
4	Pushed to the Limit	Pilot Under Pressure	Pushed to the Limit	Pushed to the Limit	S04E04
5	Blind Landing	Crash in the Jungle	Blind Landing	Blind Landing	S04E05
6	Grand Canyon Disaster	Grand Canyon Disaster	Grand Canyon Disaster	Grand Canyon	S04E06
7	Catastrophe at O'Hare	America's Deadliest Crash	America's Deadliest	Catastrophe at O'Hare	S04E07
8	Focused on Failure	Fatal Fixation	Fatal Fixation	Focused on Failure	S04E08
9	Lokomotiv Hockey Team Disaster	Russia's Ice Hockey Disaster	Lokomotiv Hockey Team Disaster	Hockey Team Tragedy	S04E09
10	Death of the President	Death of the President	Death of the President	Death of the President	S04E10
11	Heading to Disaster	Heading to Disaster	Heading to Disaster	Subtle Incapacitation	S04E11
12	28 Seconds to Survive	28 Seconds to Survive	28 Seconds to Survive	Seconds to Survive	S04E12
13	Air France 447: Vanished	Air France 447: Vanished	Air France 447: Vanished	Vanished	S04E13
Season 13 (2013–2014)
1	Fight to the Death	Britain's Worst Air Crash	Fight to the Death	Fight to the Death	S05.E01
2	Speed Trap	Speed Trap	Speed Trap	Speed Trap	S05.E02
3	Lost in Translation	Lost in Translation	Lost in Translation	Lost in Translation	S05.E03
4	Disaster on the Potomac	Disaster on the Potomac	Disaster on the Potomac	Tragedy on the Potomac	S05.E04
5	Queens Catastrophe	Queens Catastrophe	Queens Catastrophe	Queens Catastrophe	S05.E05
6	Into the Eye of the Storm	Into the Eye of the Storm	Into the Eye of the Storm	Into the Eye of the Storm	S05.E06
7	Massacre over the Mediterranean	Massacre over the Mediterranean	Massacre over the Mediterranean	Massacre over the Mediterranean	S05.E07
8	Imperfect Pitch	Deadly Test	Deadly Test	Imperfect Pitch	S05.E08
9	Terror in Paradise	Terror in Paradise	Terror in Paradise	Terror in Paradise	S05.E10
10	Titanic in the Sky	Qantas 32: Titanic in the Sky	Qantas 32	Titanic in the Sky	S05.E11
11	Getting out Alive	TBD	TBD	Getting out Alive	S05.E09
Season 14 (2014–2015)
1	Choosing Sides	M1 Plane Crash	Total Engine Failure	Choosing Sides	S08.E01
2	Niki Lauda: Testing the Limits	Niki Lauda: Tragedy in the Air	Niki Lauda: Tragedy in the Air	Testing the Limits	S08.E02
3	Vanishing Act	Vanishing Act	Vanishing Act	Vanishing Act	S08.E03
4	Sideswiped	Sideswiped	Sideswiped	Sideswiped	S08.E04
5	The Final Push	Death at Narita	Death at Narita	The Final Push	S08.E05
6	The Death of JFK Jr.	The Death of JFK Jr.	The Death of JFK Jr.	The Death of JFK Jr.	S08.E06
7	Concorde - Up in Flames	Concorde - Up in Flames	Concorde - Up in Flames	Concorde - Up in Flames	S08.E07
8	Accident or Assassination	Inner City Carnage	Inner City Carnage	Accident or Assassination	S08.E08
9	No Clear Options	3rd Time Unlucky	3rd Time Unlucky	No Clear Options	S08.E09
10	Death in the Arctic	Death in the Arctic	Death in the Arctic	Death in the Arctic	S08.E10
11	What Happened to Malaysian 370?	Malaysian 370: What Happened?	What Happened to MH370?	What Happened to Malaysian 370?	S14.E11
Season 15 (2015–2016)
1	Fatal Transmission	Fatal Transmission	Fatal Transmission	Fatal Transmission	S09.E01
2	Terror in San Francisco	Terror in San Francisco	Terror in San Francisco	Terror in San Francisco	S09.E02
3	High Rise Catastrophe	High Rise Catastrophe	High Rise Catastrophe	High Rise Catastrophe	S09.E03
4	Fatal Delivery	Fatal Delivery	Fatal Delivery	Fatal Delivery	S09.E05
5	Deadly Mission	Deadly Mission	Deadly Mission	Deadly Mission	S09.E10
6	Edge of Disaster	Edge of Disaster	Edge of Disaster	Edge of Disaster	S09.E09
7	Deadly Delay	Fatal Delay	Deadly Delay	Deadly Delay	S09.E07
8	Fatal Focus	Fatal Focus	Fatal Focus	Fatal Focus	S09.E04
9	Steep Impact	Steep Impact	Steep Impact	Steep Impact	S09.E08
10	Carnage in São Paulo	Carnage in São Paulo	Carnage in São Paulo	Carnage in São Paulo	S09.E06
Season 16 (2016–2017)
1	Deadly Silence	Deadly Silence	Deadly Silence	Deadly Silence	S10.E01
2	9/11: The Pentagon Attack	9/11: The Plane That Hit The Pentagon	9/11: The Pentagon Attack	The Pentagon Attack	S10.E02
3	Disaster at Tenerife	Disaster at Tenerife	Disaster at Tenerife	Disaster in Tenerife	S10.E03
4	Deadly Detail	Deadly Detail	Deadly Detail	Deadly Detail	S10.E04
5	Deadly Detour	Deadly Detour	Deadly Detour	Deadly Detour	S10.E05
6	Dangerous Approach	Dangerous Approach	Dangerous Approach	Dangerous Approach	S10.E06
7	Murder in the Skies	Crash in the Alps	Murder in the Skies	Murder in the Skies	S10.E07
8	River Runway	River Runway	River Runway	River Runway	S10.E08
9	Deadly Solution	Deadly Solution	Deadly Solution	Deadly Solution	S10.E09
10	Afghan Nightmare	Afghan Nightmare	Afghan Nightmare	Afghan Nightmare	S10.E10
Season 17 (2017)
1	Killer Attitude	Killer Attitude	Killer Attitude	Killer Attitude	S11.E02
2	Deadly Myth	Deadly Myth	Deadly Myth	Deadly Myth	S11.E03
3	Turning Point	Turning Point	Turning Point	The Turning Point	S11.E04
4	Explosive Proof	Explosive Proof	Explosive Proof	Explosive Proof	S11.E01
5	Lethal Turn	Lethal Turn	Lethal Turn	Lethal Turn	S11.E05
6	Storming Out	Storming Out	Storming Out	Storming Out	S11.E06
7	Caught on Tape	Caught on Tape	Caught on Tape	Caught on Tape	S11.E07
8	Terror over Egypt	Terror over Egypt	Terror over Egypt	Terror over Egypt	S11.E08
9	Deadly Discussions	Deadly Discussions	Deadly Discussions	Deadly Discussions	S11.E09
10	The Lost Plane	The Lost Plane	The Lost Plane	The Lost Plane	S11.E10
Season 18 (2018)
1	Nuts and Bolts	Nuts and Bolts	Nuts and Bolts	Nuts and Bolts	S12.E01
2	Blown Away	Blown Away	Blown Away	Blown Away	S12.E02
3	Deadly Distraction	Deadly Distraction	Deadly Distraction	Deadly Distraction	S12.E03
4	Deadly Airspace	Deadly Airspace	Deadly Airspace	Deadly Airspace	S12.E04
5	Deadly Display	Deadly Display	Deadly Display	Deadly Display	S12.E05
6	Deadly Mission	Deadly Mission	Deadly Mission	Deadly Space	S12.E06
7	Free Fall	Free Fall	Free Fall	Free Fall	S12.E07
8	Deadly Inclination	Deadly Inclination	Deadly Inclination	Deadly Inclination	S12.E08
9	Deadly Go-Round	Deadly Go-Round	Deadly Go-Round	Deadly Go-Round	S12.E09
10	Dead of Winter	Dead of Winter	Dead of Winter	Dead of Winter	S12.E10
Season 19 (2019)
1	Deadly Descent	Deadly Descent	Deadly Descent	Deadly Descent	S13.E01
2	Death Race	Death Race	Death Race	Death Race	S13.E02
3	Fatal Approach	Fatal Approach	Fatal Approach	Fatal Approach	S13.E03
4	Borderline Tactics	Borderline Tactics	Borderline Tactics	Borderline Tactics	S13.E04
5	Deadly Pitch	Deadly Pitch	Deadly Pitch	Deadly Pitch	S13.E05
6	Fatal Climb	Fatal Climb	Fatal Climb	Fatal Climb	S13.E06
7	Runway Runoff	Runway Runoff	Runway Runoff	Runway Runoff	S13.E07
8	Lethal Limits	Lethal Limits	Lethal Limits	Lethal Limits	S13.E08
9	Football Tragedy	Football Tragedy	Football Tragedy	Soccer Tragedy	S13.E09
10	Slam Dunk	Slam Dunk	Slam Dunk	Slam Dunk	S13.E10
Season 20 (2020)
1	Kathmandu Descent	Kathmandu Descent	Kathmandu Descent	Kathmandu Descent	S15.E01
2	Impossible Pitch	Impossible Pitch	Impossible Pitch	Impossible Pitch	S15.E02
3	Explosive Touchdown	Explosive Touchdown	Explosive Touchdown	Explosive Touchdown	S15.E03
4	Taxiway Turmoil	Taxiway Turmoil	Taxiway Turmoil	Taxiway Turmoil	S15.E04
5	Runway Breakup	Runway Breakup	Runway Breakup	Runway Breakup	S15.E05
6	Icy Descent	Icy Descent	Icy Descent	Icy Descent	S15.E06
7	Atlantic Ditching	Atlantic Ditching	Atlantic Ditching	Atlantic Ditching	S15.E07
8	No Warning	No Warning	No Warning	No Warning	S15.E08
9	Cockpit Killer	Cockpit Killer	Cockpit Killer	Cockpit Killer	S15.E09
10	Stormy Cockpit	Stormy Cockpit	Stormy Cockpit	Stormy Cockpit	S15.E10
Season 21 (2021)
1	North Sea Nightmare	North Sea Nightmare	North Sea Nightmare	North Sea Nightmare	S16.E01
2	Playing Catch Up	Playing Catch Up	Playing Catch Up	Playing Catch Up	S16.E02
3	Tragic Takeoff	Tragic Takeoff	Tragic Takeoff	Tragic Takeoff	S16.E03
4	Grounded: Boeing Max 8	Grounded: Boeing Max 8	Grounded: Boeing Max 8	Grounded: Boeing Max 8	S16.E04
5	Cabin Catastrophe	Cabin Catastrophe	Cabin Catastrophe	Cabin Catastrophe	S16.E05
6	Meltdown Over Kathmandu	Meltdown Over Kathmandu	Meltdown Over Kathmandu	Meltdown Over Kathmandu	S16.E06
7	Mission Disaster	Mission Disaster	Mission Disaster	Mission Disaster	S16.E07
8	Caught in a Jam	Caught in a Jam	Caught in a Jam	Caught in a Jam	S16.E08
9	Seconds From Touchdown	Seconds From Touchdown	Seconds From Touchdown	Seconds From Touchdown	S16.E09
10	Deadly Delivery	Deadly Delivery	Deadly Delivery	Deadly Delivery	S16.E10
Season 22 (2022)
1	Holding Pattern	Holding Pattern	Holding Pattern	Holding Pattern	S17.E01
2	Peril over Portugal	Peril over Portugal	Peril over Portugal	Peril over Portugal	S17.E02
3	Stealth Bomber Down	Stealth Bomber Down	Stealth Bomber Down	Stealth Bomber Down	S17.E03
4	Double Trouble	Double Trouble	Double Trouble	Double Trouble	S17.E04
5	Pacific Plunge	Pacific Plunge	Pacific Plunge	Pacific Plunge	S17.E05
6	Terror over Michigan	Terror over Michigan	Terror over Michigan	Terror over Michigan	S17.E06
7	Tree Strike Terror	Tree Strike Terror	Tree Strike Terror	Tree Strike Terror	S17.E07
8	Pitch Black	Pitch Black	Pitch Black	Pitch Black	S17.E08
9	Turboprop Terror	Turboprop Terror	Turboprop Terror	Turboprop Terror	S17.E09
10	Loss of a Legend	Loss of a Legend	Loss of a Legend	Kobe Bryant	S17.E10
Season 23 (2023)
1	Deadly Exchange	Deadly Exchange	Deadly Exchange	Deadly Exchange	S19.E01
2	Mixed Signals	Mixed Signals	Mixed Signals	Missed Opportunities	S19.E02
3	Pressure Point	Pressure Point	Pressure Point	Pressure Point	S19.E03
4	Power Play	Power Play	Power Play	Power Play	S19.E04
5	Control Catastrophe	Control Catastrophe	Control Catastrophe	Control Catastrophe	S19.E05
6	Cockpit Catastrophe	Cockpit Catastrophe	Cockpit Catastrophe	Cockpit Catastrophe	S19.E06
7	Dream Flight Disaster	Dream Flight Disaster	Dream Flight Disaster	Dream Flight Disaster	S19.E07
8	Deadly Deception	Deadly Deception	Deadly Deception	Deadly Deception	S19.E08
9	Delivery to Disaster	Delivery to Disaster	Delivery to Disaster	Delivery to Disaster	S19.E09
10	Mystery over the Mediterranean	Mystery over the Mediterranean	Mystery over the Mediterranean	Mystery Over the Mediterranean	S19.E10
Season 24 (2024)
1	Terror Over The Pacific	Terror Over The Pacific	Terror Over The Pacific	Terror Over The Pacific	S24.E01
2	Disaster at Dutch Harbour	Disaster at Dutch Harbour	Disaster at Dutch Harbour	Disaster at Dutch Harbor	S24.E02
3	Deadly Departure	Deadly Departure	Deadly Departure	Deadly Departure	S24.E03
4	Without Warning	Without Warning	Without Warning	Without Warning	S24.E04
5	Eleven Deadly Seconds	Eleven Deadly Seconds	Eleven Deadly Seconds	Eleven Deadly Seconds	S24.E05
6	Fight for Survival	Fight for Survival	Fight for Survival	Fight for Survival	S24.E06
7	Pitch Battle	Pitch Battle	Pitch Battle	Pitch Battle	S24.E07
8	Under Fire	Under Fire	Under Fire	Under Fire	S24.E08
9	Lost Star Footballer	Lost Star Footballer	Lost Star Footballer	Lost Star Footballer	S24.E09
10	Deadly Directive	Deadly Directive	Deadly Directive	Deadly Directive	S24.E10
Season 25 (2025)
1	Pacific Ditching	Pacific Ditching	Pacific Ditching	Pacific Ditching	S25.E01
2	TBA	Running on Empty	Running on Empty	Running on Empty	S25.E02
3	TBA	Power Struggle	Power Struggle	Power Struggle	S25.E03
4	TBA	Second Thoughts	Second Thoughts	Second Thoughts	S25.E04
5	TBA	Powerless Plunge	Powerless Plunge	Powerless Plunge	S25.E05
6	TBA	Cabin Chaos	Cabin Chaos	Cabin Chaos	S25.E06
7	TBA	Deadly Climb	Deadly Climb	Deadly Climb	S25.E07
8	TBA	Firebomber Down	Firebomber Down	Firebomber Down	S25.E08
9	TBA	Collision Catastrophe	Collision Catastrophe	Collision Catastrophe	S25.E09
10	TBA	Fatal Test Flight	Fatal Test Flight	Fatal Test Flight	S25.E10
11	TBA	No Exit	No Exit	No Exit	S25.E11
Season 26 (2026)
1	TBA	Deadly Charter	Deadly Charter	TBA	
2	TBA	Norwegian Nightmare	Norwegian Nightmare	TBA	
3	TBA	A Perfect Storm	A Perfect Storm	TBA	
4	TBA	Crash Landing	Crash Landing	TBA	
5	TBA	Peril Over Pakistan	Peril Over Pakistan	TBA	
6	TBA	Deadly Cover Up	Deadly Cover Up	TBA	
7	TBA	Divided in Crisis	Divided in Crisis	TBA	
8	TBA	Moments from Touchdown	Moments from Touchdown	TBA	
9	TBA	Monsoon Approach	Monsoon Approach	TBA	
10	TBA	Mixed Measures	Mixed Measures	TBA	
The Accident Files Season 1 (2018)
1	Communication Breakdown	Communication Breakdown	Communication Breakdown	Communication Breakdown	S14.E01
2	Bad Attitude	Bad Attitude	Bad Attitude	Fatal Friction	S14.E02
3	Hero Pilots	Hero Pilots	Hero Pilots	Hero Pilots	S14.E03
4	Plane vs. Pilot	Plane vs. Pilot	Plane vs. Pilot	No Control	S14.E04
5	Explosive Evidence	Explosive Evidence	Explosive Evidence	Explosive Clues	S14.E05
6	Killer in the Cockpit?	Killer in the Cockpit?	Killer in the Cockpit?	Killer in the Cockpit?	S14.E06
7	Missing Pieces	Missing Pieces	Missing Pieces	Missing Pieces	S14.E07
8	Controversial Crashes	Controversial Crashes	Controversial Crashes	Controversial Crashes	S14.E08
9	Deadly Distractions	Deadly Distractions	Deadly Distractions	Deadly Disturbance	S14.E09
10	Fire on Board	Fire on Board	Fire on Board	Fire on Board	S14.E10
The Accident Files Season 2 (2019)
1	Headline News	Headline News	Headline News	Headline News	S20.E01
2	Rookie Errors	Rookie Errors	Rookie Errors	Rookie Errors	S20.E02
3	Collision Course	Collision Course	Collision Course	Collision Course	S20.E03
4	Engines Out	Engines Out	Engines Out	Engines Out	S20.E04
5	Fuel Trouble	Fuel Trouble	Fuel Trouble	Fuel Trouble	S20.E05
6	Perilous Payload	Perilous Payload	Perilous Payload	Perilous Payload	S20.E06
7	Runway in Sight	Runway in Sight	Runway in Sight	Runway in Sight	S20.E07
8	Deadly Confusion	Deadly Confusion	Deadly Confusion	Deadly Confusion	S20.E08
9	Radio Silence	Radio Silence	Radio Silence	Radio Silence	S20.E09
10	Design Flaws	Design Flaws	Design Flaws	Design Flaws	S20.E10
The Accident Files Season 3 (2020)
1	Heat of the Moment	Heat of the Moment	Heat of the Moment	Heat of the Moment	S20.E11
2	Instrument Confusion	Instrument Confusion	Instrument Confusion	Instrument Confusion	S20.E12
3	VIP on Board	VIP on Board	VIP on Board	VIP on Board	S20.E13
4	Lapse in Security	Lapse in Security	Lapse in Security	Lapse in Security	S20.E14
5	Mountain Impact	Mountain Impact	Mountain Impact	Mountain Impact	S20.E15
6	Survivors	Survivors	Survivors	Survivors	S20.E16
7	Death from Above	Death from Above	Death from Above	Death from Above	S20.E17
8	Courage in the Cockpit	Courage in the Cockpit	Courage in the Cockpit	Courage in the Cockpit	S20.E18
9	Maintenance Mistakes	Maintenance Mistakes	Maintenance Mistakes	Maintenance Mistakes	S20.E19
10	Take Off Tragedies	Take Off Tragedies	Take Off Tragedies	Take Off Tragedies	S20.E20
The Accident Files Season 4 (2021)
1	Dead of Night	Dead of Night	Dead of Night	Dead of Night	S20.E21
2	Engine Gone	Engine Gone	Engine Gone	Engine Gone	S20.E22
3	Lethal Choices	Lethal Choices	Lethal Choices	Lethal Choices	S20.E23
4	Risky Runways	Risky Runways	Risky Runways	Risky Runways	S20.E24
5	Landings Gone Wrong	Landings Gone Wrong	Landings Gone Wrong	Landings Gone Wrong	S20.E25
6	Frozen Wings	Frozen Wings	Frozen Wings	Frozen Wings	S20.E26
7	Runway Collisions	Runway Collisions	Runway Collisions	Runway Collisions	S20.E27
8	Cockpit Breakdown	Cockpit Breakdown	Cockpit Breakdown	Cockpit Breakdown	S20.E28
9	Splash Down	Splash Down	Splash Down	Splash Down	S20.E29
10	Northern Extremes	Northern Extremes	Northern Extremes	Northern Extremes	S20.E30
The Accident Files Season 5 (2022)
1	War Zone	War Zone	War Zone	War Zone	S22.E01
2	Time Critical	Time Critical	Time Critical	Time Critical	S22.E02
3	Ticking Time Bomb	Ticking Time Bomb	Ticking Time Bomb	Ticking Time Bomb	S22.E03
4	Accidents in the Air	Accidents in the Air	Accidents in the Air	Accidents in the Air	S22.E04
5	Impossible Landings	Impossible Landings	Impossible Landings	Impossible Landings	S22.E05
6	Trained to Fail	Trained to Fail	Trained to Fail	Trained to Fail	S22.E06
7	Deadly Data	Deadly Data	Deadly Data	Deadly Data	S22.E07
8	Poor Piloting	Poor Piloting	Poor Piloting	Poor Piloting	S22.E08
9	Dangerous Winds	Dangerous Winds	Dangerous Winds	Dangerous Winds	S22.E09
10	Sabotage	Sabotage	Sabotage	Sabotage	S22.E10
The Accident Files Season 6 (2024)
1	Pitch Problems	Pitch Problems	Pitch Problems	Pitch Problems	S23.E01
2	Fight to the Finish	Fight to the Finish	Fight to the Finish	Fight to the Finish	S23.E02
3	Bad Data	Bad Data	Bad Data	Bad Data	S23.E03
4	Landing Hazards	Landing Hazards	Landing Hazards	Landing Hazards	S23.E04
5	Training Ignored	Training Ignored	Training Ignored	Training Ignored	S23.E05
6	Reckless Approaches	Reckless Approaches	Reckless Approaches	Reckless Approaches	S23.E06

== See also ==
- Blueprint for Disaster
- Seconds From Disaster
- Seismic Seconds
- Survival in the Sky, known as Black Box in the UK
- Why Planes Crash
- Zero Hour
