= List of airline flights that required gliding =

Airplane gliding occurs when all the engines of an aircraft shut down, or do not provide any meaningful thrust, but the wings are still functional and can be used for a controlled descent. This is a very rare condition in multi-engine airliners, though it is the obvious result when a single-engine airplane experiences engine failure. The most common cause of engine shutdown is fuel exhaustion or fuel starvation, but there have been other cases in aviation history of multiple engine failure due to bird strikes, flying through volcano ash, ingesting debris, and various forms of damage due to water (hail, ice or overwhelming rain).

Below is a list of commercial airline flights that were forced to glide at some point while in the air.

Date	Flight	Aircraft	Location	Cause	Result	Total fatalities	Occupants
14 April 1953	Miami Airline (irregular air carrier)	Douglas DC-3	East of Selleck, Washington	Dual engine failure due to poor maintenance	On approach to Boeing Field, left engine failed and its propeller feathered; minutes later, right engine failed. While gliding, aircraft was unable to clear mountain, crashed into trees, breaking up. Investigation showed both engines suffered bearing failures due to negligent maintenance.	7	25
30 April 1953	Aeroflot Flight 35	Ilyushin Il-12	Kazan, Russia	Double engine failure	Suffered bird strikes (ducks), both engines quit due to a short circuit in the magneto switch. Crew tried feathering propellers, captain decided to ditch in the Volga River. One passenger drowned during evacuation.	1	23
24 February 1962	Tarom Ilyushin Il-18V	Ilyushin Il-18	Paphos, Cyprus	Icing of fuel filters (probable)	En route at 7,000 m (23,000 ft) over Mediterranean Sea while 70 km (43 mi) from coast of Cyprus, engine 3 lost power, followed by engines 1 and 2. At 3,100 m (10,200 ft), 45 km (28 mi) offshore, engine 4 also lost power. Plane underwent belly landing on ground near Paphos, Cyprus, after 45 km (28 mi) glide.	0	100
21 August 1963	Aeroflot Flight 366	Tupolev Tu-124	Leningrad, Russia	Intentional fuel exhaustion as a safety measure	Nose landing gear failed to retract properly after takeoff; crew unable to lock gear in extended position. Aircraft circled to expend fuel to reduce weight and fire hazards in event forced landing was required. Aircraft ran out of fuel, pilot successfully ditched in Neva River without injury to passengers or crew.	0	52
30 May 1967	East African Airlines 5Y-ADA	Vickers VC10	Bombay, India	Fuel starvation due to improper use of boost pumps	Climbing through 15,000 ft on departure from Bombay, all four engines lost power because of failure to use fuel boost pumps. Flight engineer was sick in lavatory and was retrieved by purser to restore power, thus arresting descent toward Indian Ocean.	0	Unknown
2 May 1970	ALM Flight 980	McDonnell Douglas DC-9	Near Saint Croix	Fuel starvation after multiple missed approaches due to bad weather	Flight originating from John F. Kennedy International Airport made three landing attempts at Princess Juliana International Airport but aborted due to bad weather. Captain diverted to St. Croix, short on fuel, decided to ditch before reaching island. Both engines flamed out shortly before ditching.	23	63
6 September 1971	Paninternational Flight 112	BAC One-Eleven	Hamburg, Germany	Engine failure due to accidental use of jet fuel in water-injection tanks	After take-off, both engines failed; pilots decided to make emergency landing on highway – Bundesautobahn 7 (also part of European route E45) – about 4.5 km (2.8 mi) from Hamburg Airport. During landing, aircraft collided with bridge, shearing both wings; plane caught fire.	22	121
17 July 1972	Civil Aviation Ministry test flight	Tupolev Tu-134	Moscow oblast, Russia	Engine shutdown due to electrical system fault	Fourth prototype Tu-134 commuter jet, undergoing testing near Moscow. Failure of onboard accumulators caused fuel pumps to halt and both engines to shut down. Attempts to restart engines did not succeed, crew decided to glide to Iksha Reservoir. No casualties occurred during ditching. Plane experienced minor damages, was grounded for use as emergency training aid of cabin crews until 2000.	0	?
4 December 1974	BOAC flight 910	Vickers VC10 G-ASGL	South China Sea	Fuel starvation due to fuel transfer error	On flight from Hong Kong to Tokyo, flight engineer failed to switch tanks feeding engines, resulting in failure of all four engines. Aircraft suffered from Dutch roll; later, engineer returned and restarted engines.	0	Unknown
4 April 1977	Southern Airways Flight 242	Douglas DC-9	Georgia, US	Hail and water ingestion	After entering thunderstorm at 14,000 ft, both engines flamed out. Aircraft performed emergency landing on Georgia highway but struck gas station and exploded during rollout.	72 (incl. 9 on ground)	85
2 December 1977	1977 Benghazi Libyan Arab Airlines Tu-154 crash	Tupolev Tu-154	Near Benghazi, Libya	Fuel exhaustion	The intended destination airport was blanketed in fog; aircraft could not successfully land, ran out of fuel while attempting to locate an alternate airport. Forced landing was made.	59	165
19 May 1978	Aeroflot Flight 6709	Tupolev Tu-154B	Maksatikha, Kalinin Oblast, Russia	Fuel exhaustion due to improper actions of flight crew	Automatic fuel-pumping system was improperly disabled, causing power generators and all three engines to fail midair at altitude of 9600 m. Attempts to restart engines and auxiliary power unit did not succeed; after 14 minutes of gliding, crew made emergency landing in potato field. This type of aircraft is capable of landing on unpaved surfaces, but landing gear, although extended, was not locked and thus collapsed. Aircraft hit trees, was destroyed; 130 people survived crash, including 27 who were injured. Four passengers died.	4	134
28 December 1978	United Airlines Flight 173	Douglas DC-8	Portland, Oregon	Fuel exhaustion	Aircraft aborted first landing attempt due to possible landing-gear failure. Pilot focused on landing gear problem, neglected crew's warning of lack of fuel. Plane ran out of fuel, glided several miles before crashing within 10 miles of airport.	10	189
12 April 1979	Aeroflot Flight 3582	Tupolev Tu-154B	Chimkent, Kazakhstan	Failure of three engines due to flight engineer error	Soon after take-off from Tashkent at altitude of 2200 m, first engine failed, followed by second and third. Aircraft glided to Chimkent airport; crew managed to restart one engine at altitude of 900 m and land safely at night.	0	164+crew
24 June 1982	British Airways Flight 009	Boeing 747-200	Jakarta, Indonesia	Volcanic ash ingestion from Mount Galunggung	En route at FL370, all engines failed. After 10 minutes of gliding, four engines restarted, but one failed again and was shut down. Flight landed safely in Jakarta.	0	263
5 May 1983	Eastern Air Lines Flight 855	Lockheed L-1011 TriStar	Atlantic Ocean off the coast of Florida	Crew shut down of engine due to low oil pressure; remaining two engines failed due to loss of oil.	After gliding for five minutes, one shut-down engine was successfully restarted. Aircraft made emergency landing at Miami International Airport; the sole running engine could not generate enough thrust to taxi aircraft to gate.	0	172
23 July 1983	Air Canada Flight 143 ("Gimli Glider")	Boeing 767-233	Gimli, Manitoba, Canada	Fuel exhaustion as result of refueling calculation error due to recent conversion to metric and deficient maintenance policies	Aircraft glided to emergency landing on decommissioned runway that had been converted to drag strip.	0	69
19 August 1983	United Airlines Flight 310	Boeing 767-222	Over the Arapahoe National Forest west of Denver, Colorado	Dual-engine flameout due to fuel system contamination	Crew restarted both engines at 15,000 feet (4,600 m), successfully landed in Denver.	0	205
24 May 1988	TACA Flight 110	Boeing 737-3T0	New Orleans, Louisiana, US	Dual engine flameout due to water ingestion	Plane glided to emergency off-airport landing on levee, undamaged; subsequently flown out to New Orleans after engine replacement.	0	45
8 January 1989	British Midland Flight 092	Boeing 737-4Y0	M1 motorway, Kegworth	Blade fracture in left engine causing heavy vibration and engine fire; pilots shut down wrong engine	When aircraft was diverted to East Midlands Airport, vibration returned, pilots erroneously shut down remaining engine. Aircraft crashed onto M1 motorway, skidding up motorway embankment, 689 yards from runway threshold.	47	126
3 September 1989	Varig Flight 254	Boeing 737-200	São José do Xingu, Amazon jungle, Brazil	Navigation error, fuel exhaustion	Crew entered incorrect heading into flight computer (270 instead of 027), taking plane over remote area of Amazon jungle. Attempts to reach alternate airport were unsuccessful; plane ran out of fuel, pilot made belly landing in jungle.	13	54
15 December 1989	KLM Flight 867	Boeing 747-406M	Redoubt Volcano, Anchorage, Alaska	Lost power in all four engines after flying through cloud of volcanic ash	All engines restarted, landed safely.	0	245
25 January 1990	Avianca Flight 52	Boeing 707-321B	Cove Neck, New York	Fuel exhaustion	Plane ran out of fuel due to multiple bad-weather approach holds to JFK Airport, crashed into hillside on Long Island.	73	158
27 December 1991	Scandinavian Airlines Flight 751	McDonnell Douglas MD-81	Gottröra, Sweden	Ice ingested into engines; dual engine failure	Crash landed in open field near Gottröra	0	129
12 November 1995	American Airlines Flight 1572	MD-83	Hartford, Connecticut	Engines ingested tree debris	Aircraft was low on approach, clipped trees on ridge-line. One engine failed, other engine severely degraded. Aircraft glided to runway.	0	78
23 November 1996	Ethiopian Airlines Flight 961	Boeing 767	Indian Ocean off the coast of Grande Comore, Comoros	Hijacking, fuel exhaustion	Aircraft taken over by hijackers demanding reroute to Australia. Plane ran out of fuel, ditched into Indian Ocean off Comoro Islands, broke apart on impact.	125	175
12 January 2000	Aeroflot aircraft transfer flight from Krasnodar to Novosibirsk	Tupolev Tu-154M	Tolmachevo, Novosibirsk, Russia	Failure of all three engines during descent due to defective fuel	All three engines failed at altitudes of 700, 300, and 6 m, respectively; crew managed to land aircraft safely.	0	30
12 July 2000	Hapag-Lloyd Flight 3378	Airbus A310-304	Vienna, Austria	Fuel exhaustion as result of landing gear failure to retract	Glided for about 20 km (12 mi) before crash landing 500 metres (1,600 ft) short of runway.	0	150
27 February 2001	Loganair Flight 670A	Shorts 360-100	Firth of Forth, Scotland	Dual engine failure from accumulation of large volumes of snow or slush in both engines	Ditched in the Firth of Forth c. 100 metres from shoreline near Granton Harbour.	2	2
24 August 2001	Air Transat Flight 236 ("Azores Glider")	Airbus A330-243	Terceira Island, Azores	Fuel exhaustion 120 km (75 mi) from emergency airport as result of fuel leak	Emergency landing; aircraft glided for 20 minutes.	0	306
14 January 2002	Sibir Flight 852	Tupolev Tu-204	Omsk, Russia	Fuel exhaustion due to closure of destination airport in Novosibirsk and strong headwinds en route to reserve airport	Airliner ran out of fuel, engines failed 15 km from airstrip in Omsk around 2000 m altitude. Aircraft glided for four minutes; crew managed to extend gear and land safely.	0	119
16 January 2002	Garuda Indonesia Flight 421	Boeing 737	Indonesia	Hail and water ingestion	After entering thunderstorm, both engines flamed out. Aircraft performed ditching on Bengawan Solo River, Indonesia. One flight attendant was killed; all others aboard survived.	1	60
13 August 2004	Air Tahoma Flight 185	Convair 580	Florence, Kentucky	Pilot error leading to fuel starvation	The captain of the flight had opened the fuel cross-feed valve, but failed to follow proper procedures, which led to both engines flaming out. The aircraft crashed into a golf course on approach, killing the first officer.	1	2
14 October 2004	Pinnacle Airlines Flight 3701	Bombardier CRJ-200	Jefferson City, Missouri	Dual engine failure outside of flight envelope	During repositioning flight, pilots experimented with performance limits of aircraft. Both engines failed at high altitude and low speed, could not be restarted. Plane attempted emergency landing at Jefferson City Memorial Airport, crashed 2.5 miles (4.0 km) short of runway. Both pilots killed.	2	2
6 August 2005	Tuninter Flight 1153	ATR 72-202	Mediterranean Sea	Aircraft fitted with incorrect model of fuel indicator, leading to incorrect assumption by flight crew of sufficient fuel	Engines failed about halfway through flight. Crew unsuccessfully attempted to restart engines, attempted to ditch aircraft at sea. Aircraft broke apart on impact.	16	39
14 August 2005	Helios Airways Flight 522	Boeing 737-31S	Grammatiko, Greece	Flight crew incapacitation due to wrong setup of pressurization system	After take-off from Larnaca, Cyprus, flight crew continued ascent despite cabin pressurization warning; all on board, except one flight attendant who attempted to control aircraft, were eventually incapacitated by lack of oxygen. The auto pilot flew aircraft to Athens, Greece, entered holding pattern until both engines flamed out due to fuel exhaustion. Aircraft descended in gliding spiral until striking hill in Grammatiko, killing all aboard.	121	121
17 January 2008	British Airways Flight 38	Boeing 777-200ER	Heathrow Airport, London, England	Restricted fuel flow to engines caused by ice in the fuel/oil heat exchangers	Crash-landed short of runway 27L; no fatalities occurred.	0	152
1 February 2008	Lloyd Aéreo Boliviano Flight 301	Boeing 727-259	Near Trinidad, Bolivia	Fuel ran out after diverting to an alternate airport due to adverse weather.	The pilots made an emergency landing in a swampy area near the airport; no fatalities occurred.	0	156
15 January 2009	US Airways Flight 1549	Airbus A320-214	New York City	Complete dual engine failure due to bird strikes moments after takeoff from La Guardia Airport	Aircraft glided and successfully ditched in Hudson River	0	155
13 October 2011	Airlines PNG Flight 1600	De Havilland Canada Dash 8-103	Near Madang, Papua New Guinea	Pilot selected beta (ground braking) prop mode in flight, props oversped, engines failed	Pilots attempted an off-airport forced landing; aircraft struck trees and caught fire. Pilots, flight attendant, and one passenger survived with injuries.	28	32
3 June 2012	Dana Air Flight 0992	McDonnell Douglas MD-83	Iju-Ishaga, Lagos	Dual engine failure from improper maintenance of fuel lines, failure for crew to divert to alternate airport when first engine failed	Crashed during landing approach into densely populated neighborhood. All 153 on board were killed and an additional six on the ground were killed.	159	153
4 February 2015	TransAsia Airways Flight 235	ATR 72-600	Keelung River, Taipei, Taiwan	One engine autofeathered due to fault in its control module; pilots shut down wrong engine	Crashed into Keelung River three minutes after take-off.	43	58
28 November 2016	LaMia Flight 2933	Avro RJ85	Near Medellín, Colombia	Fuel exhaustion	Took off with insufficient fuel reserves, crashed about 10 nmi (19 km) short of destination after short holding delay.	71	77
22 May 2020	Pakistan International Airlines Flight 8303	Airbus A320-214	Model Colony, Karachi	Engines damaged during accidental belly landing, leading to dual engine failure during go-around	Crashed into buildings on approach, 97 on board were killed and one person on the ground was also killed.	98	99
12 June 2025	Air India Flight 171	Boeing 787-8 Dreamliner	Ahmedabad, Gujarat, India	Fuel control switches moved from RUN to CUTOFF, leading to the immediate shut down of both engines on takeoff.	Crashed into hostel block of B. J. Medical College campus, Ahmedabad Civil Hospital, 1.7 kilometres (1 mi; 0.9 nmi) from the runway. 241 on board were killed, 1 passenger survived, additional 19 fatalities on the ground.	260 (incl. 19 on ground)	242
