= Avianca Flight 052 =

1990 aviation accident in New York

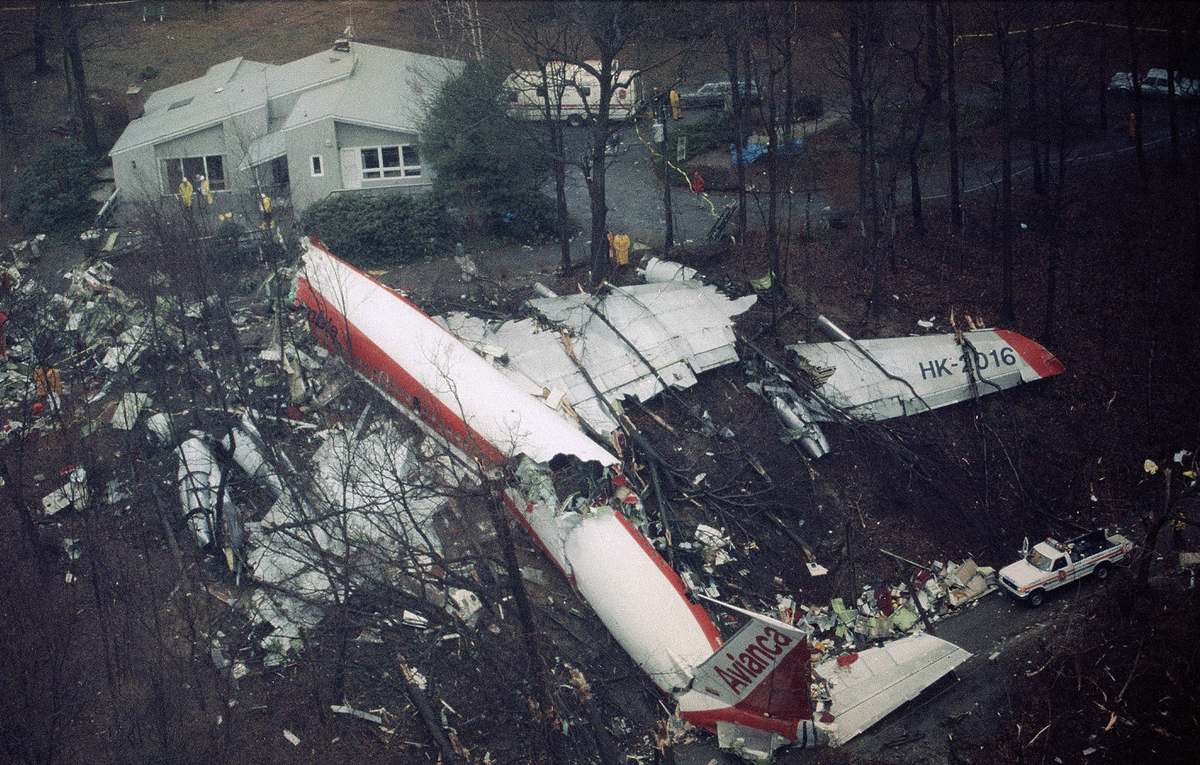
- The wreckage of the aircraft on the hillside in Cove Neck

Accident
- Date: January 25, 1990
- Summary: Crashed following fuel exhaustion
- Site: Cove Neck, New York, United States; 40°52′48″N 073°29′43″W

Aircraft
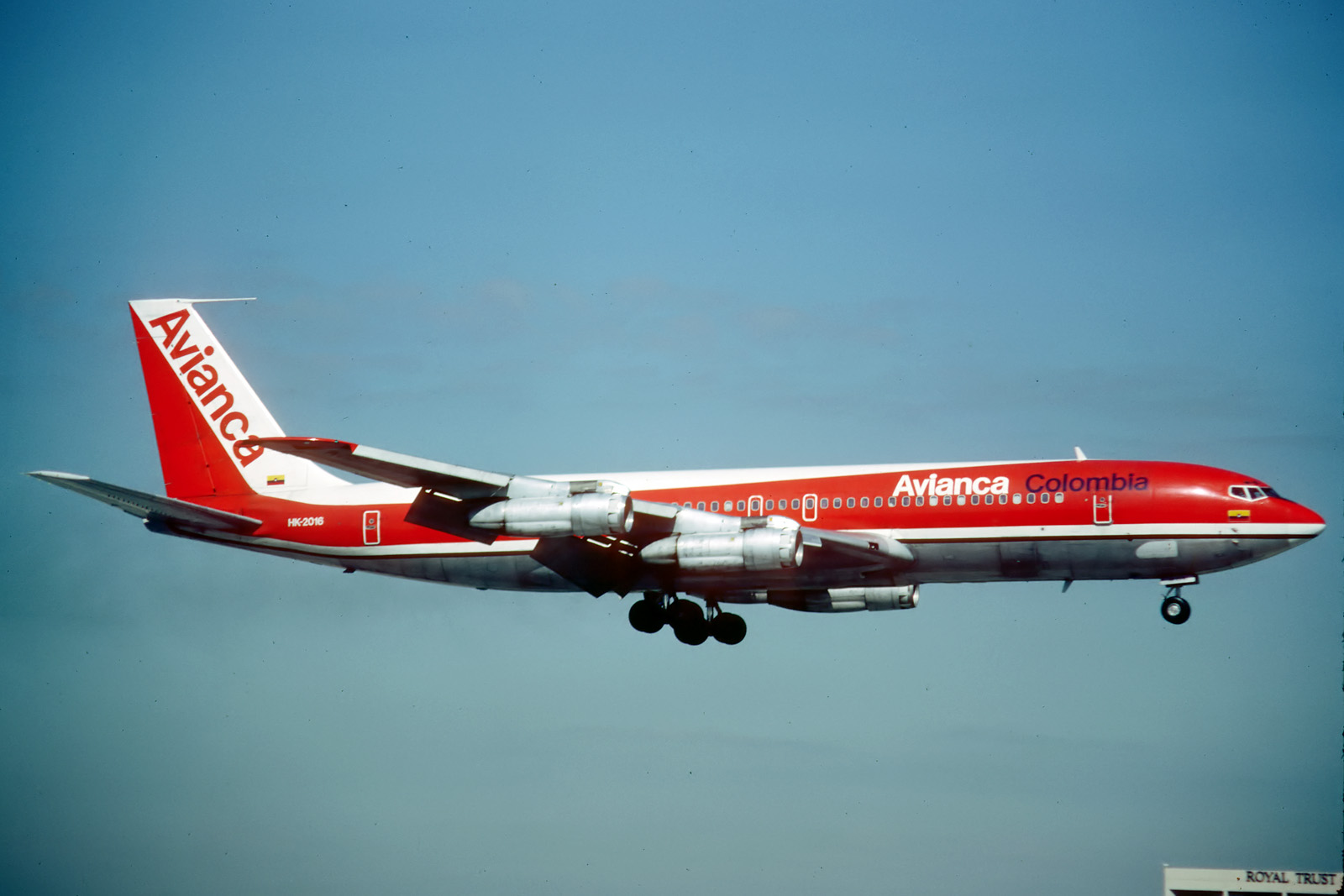
- HK-2016, the aircraft involved in the accident, pictured in 1983
- Aircraft type: Boeing 707-321B
- Operator: Avianca
- IATA flight No.: AV052
- ICAO flight No.: AVA052
- Call sign: AVIANCA 052
- Registration: HK-2016
- Flight origin: El Dorado International Airport, Bogotá, Colombia
- Stopover: José María Córdova Int'l Airport, Medellín, Colombia
- Destination: John F. Kennedy Int'l Airport, New York City, United States
- Occupants: 158
- Passengers: 149
- Crew: 9
- Fatalities: 73
- Injuries: 85
- Survivors: 85

Avianca Flight 052 was a regularly scheduled flight from Bogotá, Colombia, to New York City, United States, via Medellín, Colombia, that crashed on January 25, 1990, at 21:34 (UTC−05:00). The Boeing 707 flying this route ran out of fuel after a failed attempt to land at John F. Kennedy International Airport (JFK), causing the aircraft to crash onto a hillside in the small village of Cove Neck, New York, on the north shore of Long Island. Eight of the nine crew members and 65 of the 149 passengers on board were killed. The National Transportation Safety Board (NTSB) determined that the crash occurred due to the flight crew failing to properly declare a fuel emergency, failure to use an airline operational control dispatch system, inadequate traffic flow management by the Federal Aviation Administration (FAA), and the lack of standardized understandable terminology for pilots and controllers for minimum and emergency fuel states.

The flight left Medellín with more than enough fuel for the journey and progressed toward JFK normally. While en route, the flight was placed in three holding patterns. Due to poor communication between the air crew and the air traffic controllers, as well as an inadequate management of the fuel load by the pilots, the flight became critically low on fuel. This dire situation was not recognized as an emergency by the controllers because of the failure of the pilots to use the word "emergency". The flight attempted to make a landing at JFK, but bad weather, coupled with poor communication and inadequate management of the aircraft, forced it to abort and attempt a go-around. The flight ran out of fuel before it was able to make a second landing attempt. The airplane crashed about 20 miles (32 km) from JFK. Hundreds of emergency personnel responded to the crash site and helped save victims. Many of those who survived were severely injured and required months or years to physically recover.

NTSB investigators looked at various factors that contributed to the crash. The failures of the flight crew were cited as the probable cause of the crash, but the weather, air traffic controller performances, and FAA traffic management were also cited as contributing to the events that led to the accident. This conclusion was controversial, with disagreement between investigators, passengers, and Avianca as to who was ultimately responsible. Eventually, the U.S. government joined with Avianca and settled to pay for the damages to the victims and their families. The crash has been portrayed in a variety of media.

== Background ==
The aircraft involved was a Boeing 707-321B, registration HK-2016. The aircraft was manufactured in June 1967, and was purchased by Avianca from Pan Am in 1977. By the time of the crash, the aircraft was 22 years old and had over 61,000 flight hours. The 707 was equipped with four Pratt & Whitney JT3D-3B engines modified with a hush kit to reduce noise pollution. Avianca personnel reported that they factored in a 5% fuel overburn into the performance calculations due to the hush kit, along with an additional 5% overburn due to the age of the aircraft. Additionally, maintenance crews had noted recurring issues with the aircraft's autopilot, including the altitude hold function. These same issues were reported on the aircraft's penultimate flight, but maintenance was unable to fix the autopilot, and it was disabled as a result.

The flight was staffed by a crew of nine, including six flight attendants and three flight crew. The flight crew in the cockpit consisted of 51-year-old Captain Laureano Caviedes Hoyos, 28-year-old first officer Mauricio Klotz and 45-year-old flight engineer Matias Moyano. (Note: The NTSB report does not identify the crew by name, but lists their birth dates and employment information. Initial news reports that identified the crew by name gave incorrect ages for all three flight crewmen. Some news sources give the flight engineer's name as 'Matias Moyano Rojas' and the pilot's name as 'Laureano Caviedes Hoyos' while others omit the final surnames.) At the time of the crash, Captain Caviedes had been employed with Avianca for over 27 years and had logged over 16,000 hours of flight time, including over 1,500 in the 707. (Note: The NTSB report noted that Avianca did not record the instrument time for any of the crewmen.) Caviedes had 478 hours of night flying experience in the 707 (and 2,435 hours of night flying experience in total) and had no record of any prior accidents. Co-pilot Klotz had been employed with Avianca for three years and had 1,837 hours of flight time, with 408 hours at night. Klotz had transitioned to the 707 the previous October and had logged 64 flight hours in the airframe, including 13 at night. Flight engineer Moyano had been employed with Avianca for over 23 years and had over 10,000 hours of flight time, including over 3,000 hours in the 707 and over 1,000 hours of night flying in the same airframe (and 2,986 hours of night flying regardless of airframe). All three flight crew members had previous experience in landing at JFK.

== Accident ==
Avianca Flight 052 was a regularly scheduled international passenger flight from El Dorado International Airport in Bogotá, Colombia, to JFK in Queens, New York, with an intermediate stop at José María Córdova International Airport near Medellín, Colombia.

=== Departure and flight ===
Flight 052 departed Bogotá at 13:10 Eastern Standard Time, five minutes ahead of schedule, on January 25, 1990. (Note: All times shown in the NTSB's final report are in Eastern Standard Time, which is the time zone in which the incident occurred.) The flight landed at Medellín at 14:04 and prepared to fly the leg to JFK. At Medellín, the aircraft landed with 67,200 pounds (30,500 kg) of fuel. The flight plan filed for the journey to JFK called for 55,520 pounds (25,180 kg) of fuel required for the trip to JFK, 4,510 pounds (2,050 kg) for reserve fuel, 7,600 pounds (3,400 kg) for alternate fuel, 4,800 pounds (2,200 kg) for holding fuel, and 1,500 pounds (680 kg) of taxi fuel totaling 73,930 pounds (33,530 kg) minimum of block fuel. (Note: 'Block fuel' is the totality of trip burn fuel, reserve fuel, taxi fuel, and planned and unplanned contingency fuel.) The dispatcher at Medellín ordered a total fuel load of 78,000 pounds (35,000 kg), including 4,070 pounds (1,850 kg) of "top off" fuel to raise the aircraft weight to the maximum allowable for the planned departure runway. At Medellín, the captain and dispatcher decided to use another runway and requested an additional 2,000 pounds (910 kg) of fuel. (Note: The NTSB report notes that the flight log recovered at the accident scene recorded the aircraft as carrying 80,000 pounds (36,000 kg) of fuel at Medellín. Other documents recorded a fuel gauge sum of 82,000 pounds (37,000 kg).)

The flight departed Medellín at 15:08, bound for JFK. The flight first entered U.S. airspace of Miami Air Route Traffic Control Center at 17:28, flying at 35,000 feet (10,700 m), and proceeded northward, climbing to 37,000 feet (11,300 m). (Note: The flight was cleared to climb in the vicinity of the URSUS intersection around 24°00′N 79°4′W, and was already at 37,000 feet (11,300 m) by the time the aircraft crossed the ADOOR intersection at approximately 29°24′N 78°33′W.) The flight was cleared to fly Atlantic route 7 to the DIXON navigational aid (Note: DIXON is located at 34°34′7″N 77°27′11″W.) and jet airway 174 to Norfolk, Virginia. Flight 052 entered its first holding pattern over Norfolk at 19:04 and remained circling until 19:23. From there, Flight 052 continued on to the BOTON intersection near Atlantic City, New Jersey, where it was placed in a second holding pattern from 19:43 to 20:12. (Note: BOTON is located near 39°24′52″N 74°27′17″W.) The flight proceeded to the CAMRN intersection where it entered its third holding pattern from 20:18 to 20:47. (Note: CAMRN is located around 40°01′02″N 73°51′40″W.) Flight 052 entered the CAMRN holding pattern at 14,000 feet (4,300 m), having been cleared to descend prior to arrival at the intersection, and the flight descended further to 11,000 feet (3,400 m) while in the CAMRN holding pattern. At 20:44:09, while still holding at CAMRN, the New York Air Route Traffic Control Center (ZNY) advised Flight 052 that there was an "indefinite hold" and to continue holding at CAMRN. At 20:44:43, the ZNY controller told the flight to "expect further clearance" at 21:05. (Note: "Expect further clearance" (EFC) is an air traffic control command used, in part, to communicate a clearance limit or to announce additional holding delays.) The flight had previously been given two delay estimates that had passed.

At that point, First Officer Klotz radioed the controller, saying, "ah well I think we need priority we're passing [unintelligible]". The controller inquired as to how long the flight could hold, as well as what their alternate airport was. Klotz replied at 20:46:03 that they could hold for five more minutes. The controller once again inquired as to their alternate airport and Klotz replied at 20:46:24, "It was Boston, but we can't do it now we, we, don't, we run out of fuel now." A handoff controller listening in on the conversation called the New York Terminal Radar Approach Control (NY TRACON) at 20:46:24 and advised the TRACON controller that Avianca Flight 052 could only hold for five more minutes. The handoff controller asked whether NY TRACON could take the flight or whether to send Avianca to its alternate airport. The NY TRACON controller replied, "Slow him to one eight zero knots and I'll take him." (Note: 180 knots (210 mph; 330 km/h)) The handoff controller later testified that he had not heard Flight 052 say that they could no longer reach their alternate airport. At 20:46:47, the NY ARTCC radar controller cleared the flight to proceed to JFK at 11,000 feet (3,400 m) and to slow to 180 knots (210 mph; 330 km/h). Flight 052 departed the CAMRN holding pattern at 20:47.

=== Landing attempt ===
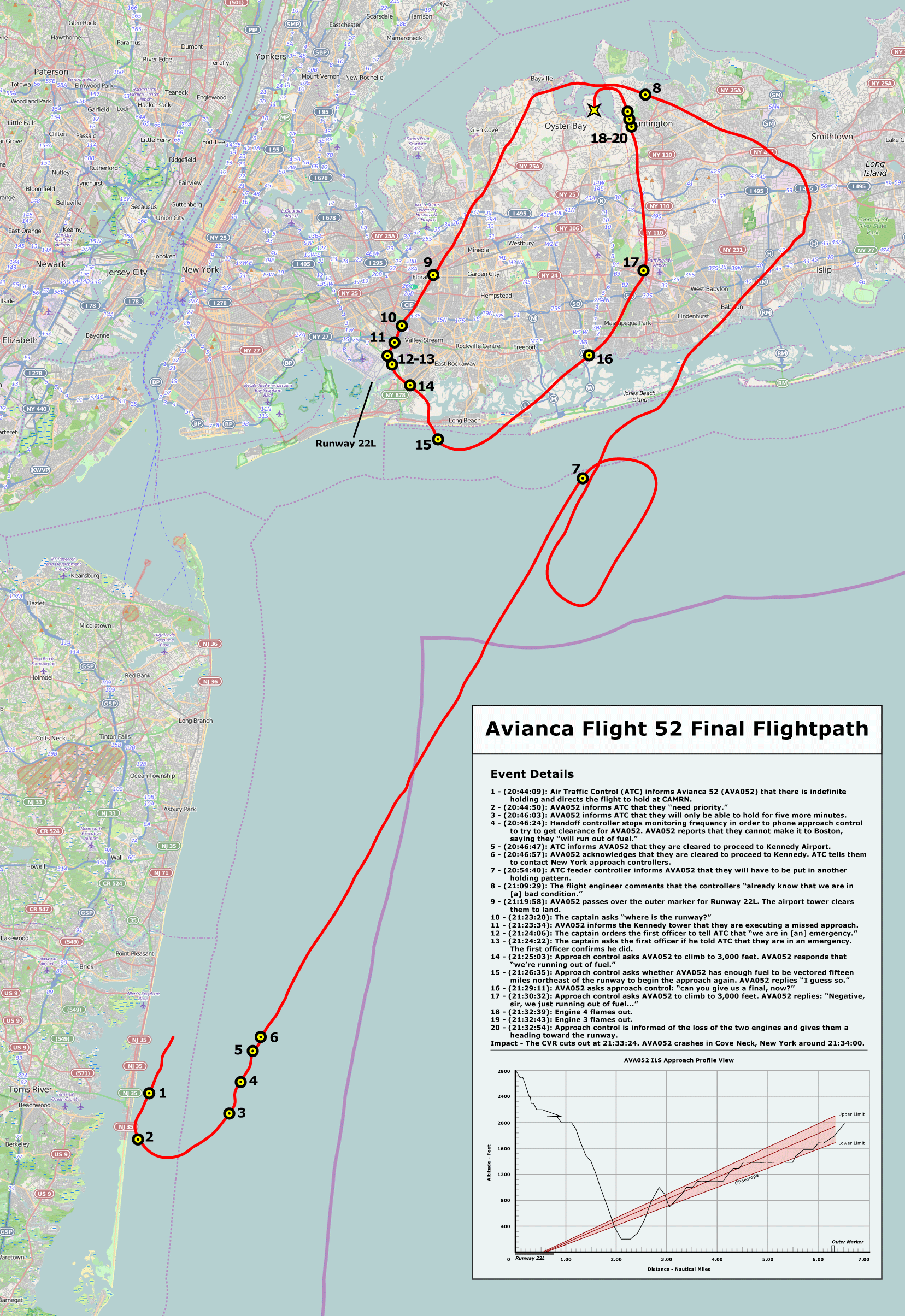
Final flight path and significant events leading up to the crash

At 20:47:27, the NY TRACON feeder controller told the flight crew to "expect an ILS two two left" (Note: Avianca Flight 052 would be following instrument flight rules for landing. 'Two two left' is JFK runway 22L.) "altimeter two niner six niner proceed direct Deer Park". (Note: Deer Park (DPK) is a navigational aid located approximately at 40°47′30″N 73°18′13″W.) At 20:54:40, the feeder controller directed Flight 052 to make a 360° turn. At 20:56:16, the controller gave the flight a wind shear advisory of an "increase of 10 knots at 1500 feet and then an increase of 10 knots at 500 feet". The flight crew acknowledged the advisory. At 21:00, JFK was experiencing light drizzle and fog with 1/4 mile visibility, an indefinite ceiling with 200 feet (61 m) obscured, and a wind of 21 knots (24 mph; 39 km/h) at 190°.

At 21:03:07, Flight 052 contacted the NY TRACON final controller, who cleared them to descend progressively to 2,000 feet (610 m). At 21:03:46, the flight crew discussed the go-around procedures. At 21:09:29, flight engineer Moyano stated that the controllers "already know that we are in [a] bad condition". The captain said, "No they are descending us", and the second officer added, "They are giving us priority". At 21:11:07, the NY TRACON final vector controller informed the flight that they were 15 miles from the outer marker and instructed them to maintain an altitude of 2,000 feet (610 m) "until established on the localizer". The flight crew began preparing for an instrument landing approach, extending flaps and discussing the appropriate airspeed. The final controller instructed the flight crew to contact the JFK tower controllers and signed off. Klotz acknowledged the transmission.

At 21:15:19, Klotz contacted the tower controllers and informed that Flight 052 was "established two two left". One minute later, the captain asked if he should lower the landing gear, but the first officer replied, "No I think it's too early now." At 21:17:30, JFK tower asked Flight 052 to increase their airspeed by 10 knots to 150 knots (170 mph; 280 km/h). At 21:18:11, the flight was 3 miles (4.8 km) from the outer marker. Twenty-one seconds later, the first officer remarked "glideslope alive". At 21:19:09, the captain requested the landing gear be deployed. Almost a minute later, the JFK tower cleared the flight to land on runway 22L. The captain asked the first officer to confirm that the flight was cleared to land. At 21:20:28, the first officer began informing the captain that the aircraft was below the glideslope. At 21:22:07, Flight 052 descended to 1,000 feet (300 m). The aircraft began descending beyond the angle of the glideslope, then began climbing above it, followed by a steeper descent. At 21:22:57, the first officer commented, "This is the wind shear." The first officer warned the captain about the sink rate and noted an altitude of 500 feet (150 m) at 21:23:10. As he warned the captain, the ground proximity warning system (GPWS) began 11 "whoop, whoop, pull up" audible warnings. At 21:23:13, the captain called for lights, followed by questions as to where the runway was a few seconds later. The GPWS began four "glideslope" audible warnings a few seconds later, alerting the flight crew that the aircraft was below the glideslope. In response to the captain's inquiries, the first officer replied that he did not see the runway. At 21:23:23, the flight began climbing again, having come within 250 feet (76 m) of crashing 2 miles short of the runway. The landing gear was raised, and the first officer announced that the flight was executing a missed approach.

=== Crash ===
Descent profile of the flight up to impact

The JFK tower controller asked the flight to climb to 2,000 feet (610 m) and make a left turn. At 21:24:06, the captain asked the first officer to "tell them we are in [an] emergency". The first officer told the JFK tower controller that "we'll try once again[;] we're running out of fuel", to which the controller replied, "okay". A few seconds later, the captain again told the first officer to "advise him we are [in an] emergency" and asked if he did so. The first officer replied, "Yes sir, I already advised him." The JFK controller directed the flight to contact the NY TRACON approach controller once more at 21:24:39. The TRACON controller asked the flight to climb once more to 3,000 feet (910 m). The captain asked the first officer again to "advise him we don't have fuel". The first officer replied, "Climb and maintain three thousand and ah we're running out of fuel sir." The captain once again asked whether the first officer had advised the controller of their emergency, and the first officer replied, "Yes sir. I already advise him[;] hundred and eighty on the heading[;] we are going to maintain 3000 feet and he's going to get us back."

A minute later, the controller instructed the flight to turn to the northeast and asked the flight crew if they had enough fuel to be directed 15 miles (24 km) from the airport. First Officer Klotz replied, "I guess so thank you very much." At 21:29:11, Klotz asked the controller if he "can give us a final now...?" The controller said, "affirmative sir[;] turn left heading zero four zero". At 21:30:12, the controller cleared another aircraft for landing. Klotz briefly thought the clearance was directed at Avianca and began to tell Captain Caviedes to change course before the controller corrected him. The controller then asked Avianca to climb to 3,000 feet (910 m). Klotz replied, "negative sir we just running out of fuel we okay three thousand now okay". The controller continued to direct the flight northward, away from the airport. At 21:31:01, the controller said, "Okay and you're number two for the approach[;] I just have to give you enough room so you make it without ah having to come out again."

Locations of passengers indicated by severity/lack of injury from the NTSB report

At 21:32:38, the cockpit voice recorder (CVR) recorded a temporary interruption in power. A second later, Flight Engineer Moyano exclaimed, "Flame out[;] flame out on engine number four." The CVR recorded another interruption in power one second after that, and Moyano said, "Flame out on engine number three[;] essential on number two or number one." The captain acknowledged. At 21:32:49, Klotz radioed the controller, informing him that the flight had "just ah lost two engines[,] and ... we need priority please". The controller instructed the flight to fly southwest to intercept the localizer. Klotz acknowledged this. The flight crew selected the ILS. At 21:33:04, the controller informed the flight that they were 15 miles (24 km) from the outer marker and cleared them for an ILS approach on runway 22L. Klotz acknowledged. That was the final radio transmission from Flight 052. Caviedes asked if the ILS had been selected. Klotz replied, "It is ready on two" at 21:33:23. One second later, the CVR stopped recording. At 21:34:00, the controller tried to radio the flight, asking, "You have enough fuel to make it to the airport?" There was no response.

The NTSB report estimates that around this time, the flight crashed. The aircraft descended without power, clipped several trees and posts, and crashed onto a hill with a 24° slope in Cove Neck, New York. The fuselage partially fragmented into three distinct pieces. The cockpit and forward cabin separated from the rest of the airframe and were hurled over the crest of the hill, coming to a stop 90 feet (27 m) from the rest of the wreckage. The rest of the fuselage stopped within 25 feet (7.6 m) after impact. The main fuselage came to rest on the upslope of the hill, facing south, with the forward end extending over the crest of the hill. The right side of the forward end of the fuselage fractured a residential wooden deck.

== Recovery ==
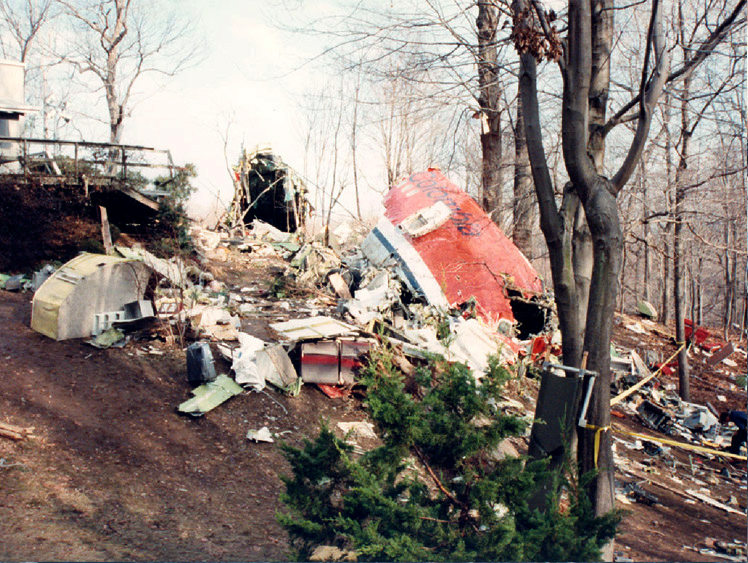
The cockpit and forward galley fragment at the crash site with the rest of the fuselage in the background

=== First response ===
Residents of Cove Neck immediately called emergency services. Jeff Race, a paramedic and member of New York City's Emergency Medical Service, who lived half a mile from the crash site, was the first rescuer on site. He reported that most passengers were still strapped in their seats and the survivors were crying out for help. Survivors later commented that it took about half an hour for rescue teams to arrive. Initial reports to emergency services reported that a much larger Boeing 747 had crashed. Fire Chief Thomas Reardon of Oyster Bay Fire Company No. 1 was in charge of the initial effort to remove people from the wreckage. In his first call to the Nassau County Fire Commission dispatch, he requested all the help available. Thirty-seven fire and ambulance companies, as well as more than 700 Nassau County police officers arrived to help. Other companies that were not called showed up voluntarily to assist. The swell of support created major problems for extricating survivors.

The crash was only accessible to vehicles via a single residential street. With the surge of rescue personnel who converged on the area, the roads leading to the site soon became choked with traffic. Emergency vehicle drivers abandoned their vehicles contrary to established policy in the course of the rescue efforts. This prevented other vehicles from being able to access the crash area. The road was so impassable that many rescue workers left their vehicles miles away and made it to the scene on foot. Fog also grounded rescue helicopters for two hours. As a result, many critically injured survivors were not evacuated until 23:30. Eventually, four helicopters from the New York City Police Aviation Unit evacuated 21 people from the crash site. Also, major problems occurred with communication by rescuers. Radio frequencies became overloaded, and authorities on site were unable to make command decisions in some cases. The head of surgery of the Nassau County Medical Center was present at the scene, but unable to direct patients to the best locations because many rescuers were radioing the center itself to get advice on where they should send the survivors. Medical professionals on site reported that some hospitals received the most up-to-date information by watching the news coverage. Three of the passengers found alive died of their injuries.

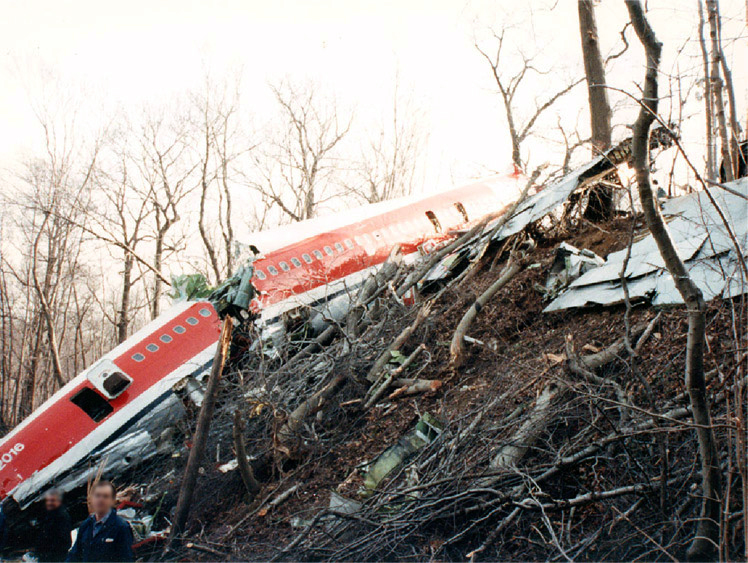
Wreckage of the aircraft from another view

Rescue workers set up two triage areas on the lawn of John and Kay McEnroe, the parents of professional tennis player John McEnroe, at 13 Tennis Court Road. A morgue and command post were also set up on their property, which was 500 feet (150 m) from the crash site. The crashed 707 also lay 150 feet (46 m) from the residence of film actress Adrienne King, who assisted in the rescuing of survivors, and the recovery of bodies. At least six bodies were found outside the fuselage. Firefighters and medics erected ladders next to the airframe wreckage and led passengers down on stretchers and to the triage sites. At these sites, doctors tagged the critically injured patients for immediate evacuation. At least 30 bodies were gathered on the makeshift morgue at the McEnroe property by 03:00 the following morning. Passenger Astrid Lopez was initially believed to be dead due to her severe injuries, and officials placed her body in the morgue. A rescuer soon heard her moans, and she was sent to a hospital. Some medical responders were turned away from the scene by police to help ease the congestion. By 03:30, all the survivors had been evacuated to hospitals. At least one emergency responder was hospitalized as a result of the rescue efforts. Many local New York residents showed up at hospitals with food or blankets, or to volunteer as Spanish interpreters. The New York Blood Center reported collecting 2,000 units of blood, almost triple their goal.

=== Casualties ===
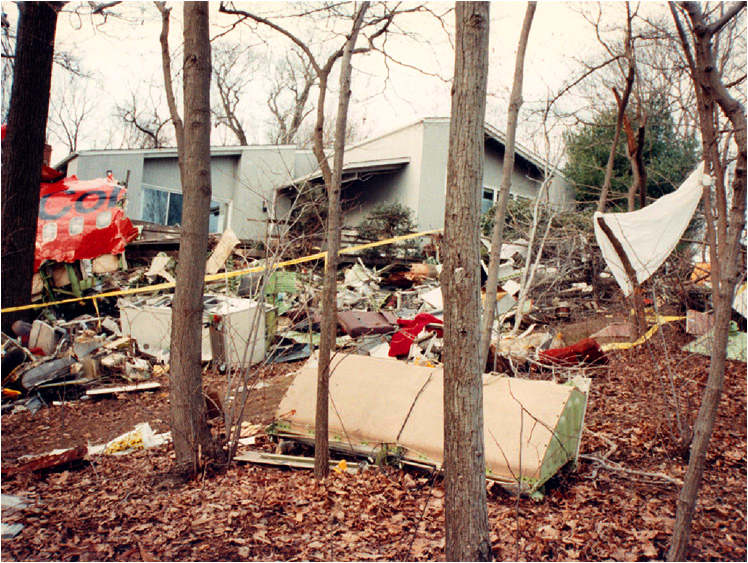
The aircraft crashed in front of the house of Sam Tissenbaum.

Of the 158 people on board, 73 died as a result of the crash. The lead flight attendant was the only crew member to survive, while the remaining flight attendants and all three flight crew members died. Of the surviving passengers, 72 adults and children over three years old sustained serious injuries, while two sustained minor injuries. (Note: Serious injury was defined by NTSB regulation as an injury which "requires hospitalization for more than 48 hours, commencing within 7 days from the date of the injury was received; ... results in a fracture of any bone (except simple fractures of fingers, toes, or nose); ... causes severe hemorrhages, nerve, muscle, or tendon damage; ... involves any internal organ; or ... involves second- or third-degree burns, or any burns affecting more than 5% of the body surface".) Of the 11 infants, two sustained minor injuries, eight were seriously injured, and one died. The surviving flight attendant testified that no communication was made from the cockpit as to the unfolding situation, thus no warning came in the end to assume brace positions. The NTSB report held that, had passengers been warned ahead of time to brace for impact, the severity of some injuries might have been avoided.

The most common serious injuries were multiple lower leg fractures and dislocations, spinal fractures, hip fractures, head injuries, and multiple lacerations and contusions. The NTSB investigators found severe damage on the floor of the cabin, leading many of the passengers' seats to fracture where their legs met the floor track. This fracturing permitted many of the seats to come loose during the impact and aggravated the passengers' injuries. The report posits that the passengers' legs hit the lower seat frames in front of them. At the same time, the seats collapsed and twisted downward and to the left, likely causing hip and spinal fractures. As the impact progressed, the seats, now separated, flung passengers forward into each other and into other wreckage, causing head injuries and lacerations. Passengers holding onto infants reported being unable to either prevent their children from being ejected from their grasp in the impact or locate their children in the darkness afterward. The NTSB held that, had the children been in FAA-approved child seats, many injuries might have been mitigated. Rescuers remarked that one rescued baby was found smiling. The NTSB was unable to accurately chart where individual passengers were seated because Avianca only assigned seats to a few passengers, and many who were assigned reported moving after takeoff.

The cockpit was severely damaged in the impact. It struck an oak tree, which penetrated the area occupied by Klotz and Moyano. All the seats occupied by the flight crew were found outside the cockpit. Neither of the pilots' seats had shoulder straps as were required by United States domestic passenger flights. At least one flight crew member was airlifted to Nassau County Medical Center. The NTSB report states that all of the flight crew "died from blunt-force head and upper torso trauma". Five flight attendants also died from blunt-force trauma to the limbs, abdomen, chest, and head.

== Investigation ==
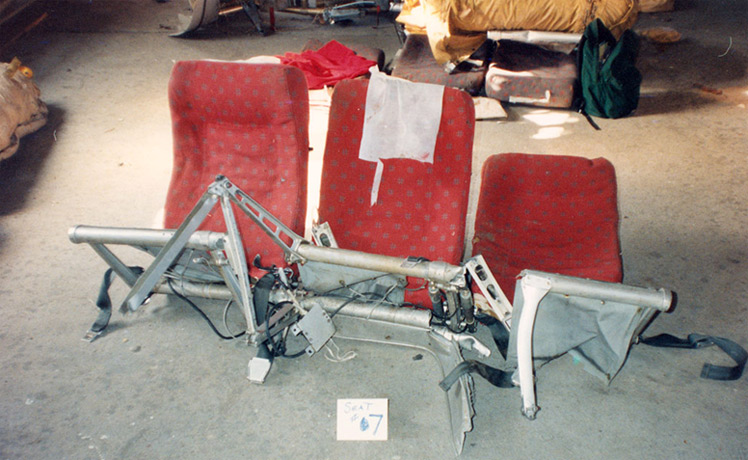
The structural limitations of the aircraft seats contributed to the passengers' injuries.

The NTSB commenced an investigation, which began shortly after the crash, and concluded with the issuance of its final report on April 30, 1991. Because it involved a Colombian airline, Colombia's Departamento Administrativo de Aeronáutica Civil (DAAC) also conducted an investigation into the accident.

A survey of the wreckage revealed that the tail was mostly intact, and all control surfaces were connected to the pilots' controls. Both wings had been severely damaged on impact and fractured into several pieces. The flaps and slats were found in their extended positions, with the flaps set at 14°. As with the tail, all wing control surfaces were found to have been connected to the pilots' controls. No evidence was found of any control surface failure prior to the crash. Investigators realized that none of the four engines had been under power at the time of impact. As the first responders worked to rescue the passengers, investigators recovered the flight data recorder (FDR) and cockpit voice recorder (CVR) from the wreckage, and brought them to the NTSB laboratory in Washington, DC. The FDR was an older oscillographic foil model. In 1989, the FAA began requiring domestic carriers to change to digital FDRs to minimize the errors that foil models produced. This requirement did not apply to international carriers. The Avianca FDR foil was found to have been taped down at some point prior to the flight, and thus was inoperative. The NTSB recommended in the Avianca report that the FAA take an "active role in ensuring upgraded international standards" for flight recorders. The CVR and ATC recordings became vital sources of evidence for the crash. The investigators also looked at meteorological factors that led to flight problems.

The NTSB investigators found that the weather data which the flight crew received in Medellín were 9–10 hours old. Additionally, the alternate airport on the flight plan, Logan International Airport in Boston, was forecast to be below the minimum for safe landing. The NTSB also stated that the flight crew should have been more aware of these problems and cited these deficiencies as evidence of inadequacies in the dispatch of the airplane. The NTSB also found no evidence that the flight crew ever requested weather information en route or communicated with Avianca dispatchers about their fuel status and intents as other flights did. Flight 052 did not make contact with FAA flight service stations or flight watch en route, and the NTSB was unable to determine why. The flight did not express any concern to ATC about their fuel situation during the first two holding patterns that the flight made. The first indication of worry came at 20:09 when the flight crew inquired about delays at Boston. The NTSB posited that the flight crew might have become confused about the "expect further clearance" (EFC) times they were given. This confusion may have been the reason that the flight continued to hold, burning up its reserve fuel to the point where it could no longer divert to Boston.

Investigators also cited the flight engineer for failing to calculate the "minimum approach/landing fuel quantity". (Note: The NTSB report defines this as "the fuel quantity that the captain would want on board as he commenced the first approach".) The report references the 360° turn that the flight was ordered to make at 20:54 as evidence that the crew should have known that they were being treated routinely and not given any emergency priority. Instead, the CVR revealed that the flight crew was convinced that they were being given priority. Additionally, the NTSB criticized the first officer for failing to use the word "emergency" as the captain had insisted he do. Compounded with the apparent inability of the captain to hear or understand the radio communications, the NTSB called the situation a "total breakdown in communications by the flight crew". Summarizing, the investigators cited "the flight crew's failure to notify ATC of their fuel situation while holding at CAMRN in order to ensure arrival at the approach fix with an adequate approach minimum fuel level and a breakdown in communications between the flight crew and ATC, and among the flight crewmembers" as the two main factors that led to the crash.

Investigators asserted that the performances by the traffic controllers were proper and that the misunderstandings that were made were reasonable. None of the controllers involved considered the word "priority" or the assertions by the flight crew that they were running out of fuel to be indicative of an emergency. The report provided various examples of the flight crew failing to convey the danger of their situation, even moments before the engines flamed out. Although the investigators felt that the communications from the ATC personnel were "proper", the NTSB voiced concern over the controllers not placing significance on the word "priority". At a public hearing, it was revealed by an unrelated pilot that the emphasis on the word "priority" by the Avianca crew might have come from training and bulletins from Boeing that used the word in relation to fuel emergencies. Avianca also used the word "priority" in its publications on low-fuel status procedures. ATC controllers testified that "Mayday", "pan-pan", and "emergency" were the three phrases that they would respond to immediately. The report also stated that "priority" was defined in the ATC Handbook as "precedence, established by order of urgency or importance". As a result of this linguistic confusion, the NTSB recommended that the FAA work with the International Civil Aviation Organization to develop a standard glossary of clearly defined terms, as well as notify foreign carriers that they must be knowledgeable of ATC rules and procedures.

The NTSB also cited the captain's inability to land on his first attempt as contributing to the crash. The investigation revealed that wind shear was a significant factor in the failed approach, but that other factors probably contributed. The report cited recurring maintenance problems with the airplane's autopilot as a possible factor. Since the pilots had been forced to fly manually from Medellín, investigators believed this might have added to exhaustion and stress in the cockpit. For evidence, the NTSB pointed to nine instances where the captain asked the copilot to repeat the ATC instructions or to confirm the aircraft configuration. This stress, investigators asserted, would have degraded the flight crew's performance on final approach. Investigators also looked at the traffic management by the Central Flow Control Facility (CFCF). The CFCF, in communication with NY TRACON, established an airport acceptance rate of 28 aircraft landings per hour that morning. Later, a CFCF supervisor contacted NY TRACON and requested a higher rate of 33 landings per hour. This acceptance rate, investigators concluded, was based on inaccurate weather conditions. The report concluded that these traffic-management problems contributed to the conditions that led to the accident but did not lead directly to the accident.

=== Controversy ===
The probable cause of the crash was determined by the NTSB to be "the failure of the flight crew to adequately manage the airplane's fuel load, and their failure to communicate an emergency fuel situation to air traffic control before fuel exhaustion occurred". However, two NTSB members filed dissenting opinions in the report. Jim Burnett voted against the adoption of the report because he felt it did not adequately address the failures of the air traffic controllers or the FAA's role in allowing more traffic than JFK could handle. Christopher Hart filed a partial dissent because he disagreed with the report's findings of a lack of standardized terminology. In his dissent, he wrote that "we do have standardized understandable terminology ... that would have adequately communicated the existence of a dangerous situation, and the problem was that the pilots failed to use this terminology with the controllers".

Colombia's DAAC investigators also disagreed with some of the NTSB's findings. In a comment on a draft of the NTSB's report, the DAAC recommended that the NTSB place some responsibility on the controllers for their "inadequate handling" of the Avianca flight. The DAAC also recommended that the NTSB encourage modifying the EFC system, and that FAA regulations should require an "active flight-following system" to assist flight crews in evaluating weather and traffic delays.

== Aftermath ==
Two male passengers were arrested at North Shore Hospital after a nurse informed police that 46-year-old Antonio Zuluaga had swallowed containers filled with cocaine. Zuluaga, who had a fractured spine, broken ribs, and a dislocated hip, was the second passenger to be found in possession of cocaine packages, after doctors operating on Jose Figueroa on the day after the crash to stop internal bleeding had also discovered packets of cocaine. Zuluaga and Figueroa pleaded guilty to second-degree criminal possession of a controlled substance. Figueroa was sentenced to seven years to life in prison, and Zuluaga was sentenced to six years to life.

Many crash survivors suffered long recoveries from the physical and psychological traumas they endured. A month after the crash, an orderly caravan of around 1,000 vehicles drove to JFK while some demonstrators laid wreaths in the international terminal lobby to protest the handling of the flight. Some survivors sued the FAA, accusing the agency of failing to ensure the flight's safety. In July 1990, Avianca offered $75,000 to each crash survivor or the relatives of those killed. The U.S. government eventually joined Avianca and reached a settlement estimated at over $200 million in damages to the victims.

The same summer, Avianca flights declared two notable fuel emergencies. The first happened in June, when a flight declared a "minimum fuel situation" and landed with only 10 minutes' worth of fuel left. The second happened in August, when Avianca Flight 020 declared it had "only 15 minutes of fuel left". Confusion arose as to what the pilot meant, but controllers declared an emergency pre-emptively and cleared the plane to land immediately. The flight was later found to have had over two hours' worth of fuel remaining.

In 2025, Christopher Maag of The New York Times wrote that "Flight 52 has largely faded from the public memory."

== In popular culture ==
- The events of Flight 052 were featured in "Missing over New York", a season-two (2005) episode of the Canadian TV series Mayday (called Air Emergency and Air Disasters in the U.S. and Air Crash Investigation in the UK and elsewhere around the world). The dramatization was broadcast with the title "Deadly Delay" in the United Kingdom, Australia, and Asia. The flight was also included in a Mayday season-eight (2009) Science of Disaster special titled "System Breakdown", which looked at the role of air traffic controllers in aviation disasters.
- Avianca Flight 052 was featured on the MSNBC network's Why Planes Crash series, in an episode titled "Human Error".
- The impact of cultural differences between the Colombian pilots and American air traffic controllers was discussed in Malcolm Gladwell's book Outliers.
- Stock footage of the plane wreckage was used in the 2004 film The Day After Tomorrow.
- Survivor Nestor Zarate wrote a book about the flight, titled 20 minutos antes... 20 años después (20 Minutes Before... 20 Years Later).
- Child psychiatrist Victor Fornari wrote about his relationship with an 8 year old survivor of the crash in a 2025 article.

== See also ==
- Impact of culture on aviation safety
- United Airlines Flight 173
- LaMia Flight 2933
- 1977 Libyan Arab Airlines Tu-154 crash
- List of airline flights that required gliding
