= Ethiopian Airlines Flight 961 =

1996 aircraft hijacking and crash in the Comoros

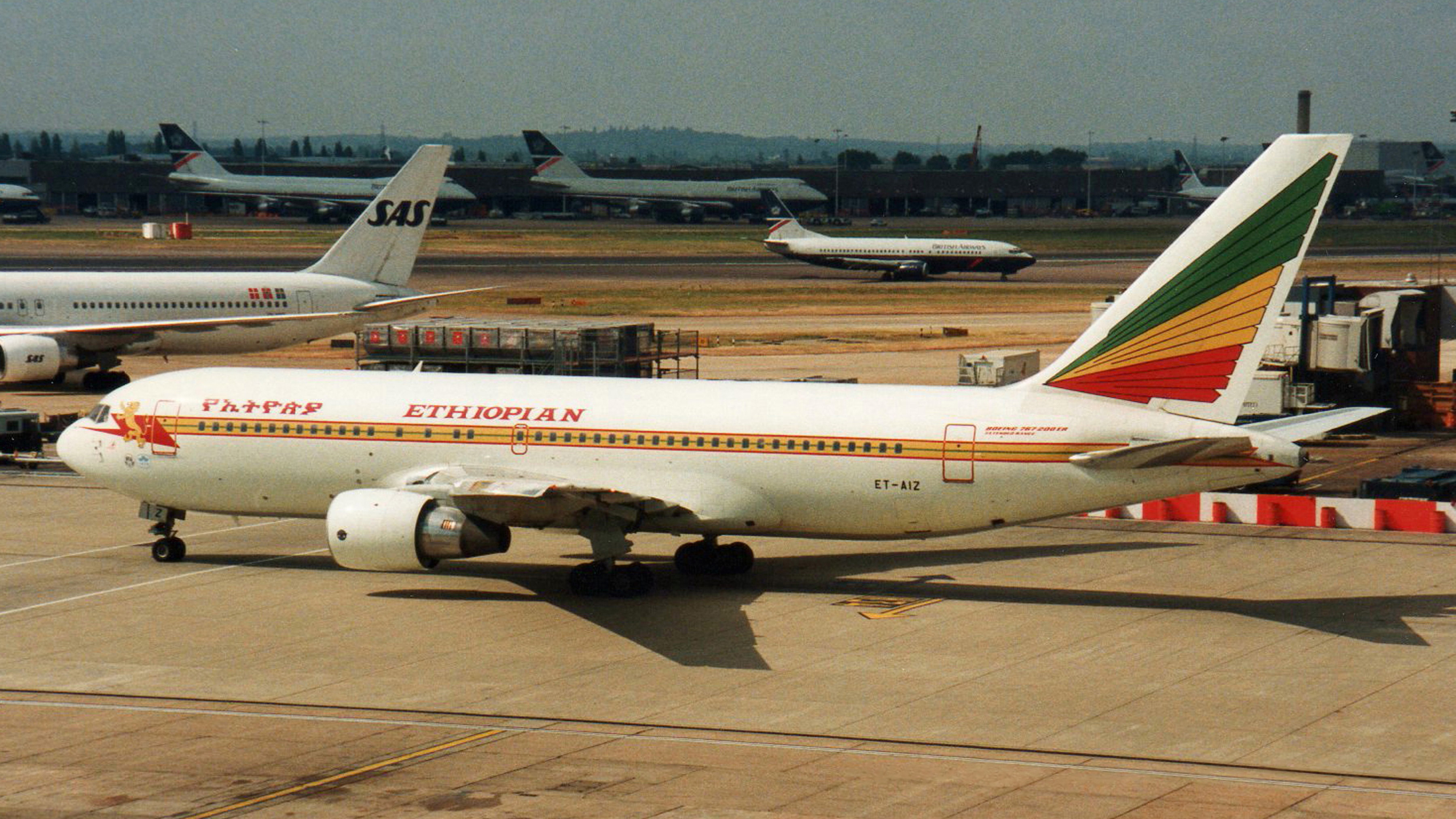
- ET-AIZ, the aircraft involved in the hijacking, photographed at Heathrow Airport in July 1996

Hijacking
- Date: 23 November 1996
- Summary: Hijacking leading to fuel exhaustion, subsequent ditching
- Site: Grande Comore, Comoros; 11°22′22″S 43°18′25″E

Aircraft
- Aircraft type: Boeing 767-260ER
- Operator: Ethiopian Airlines
- IATA flight No.: ET961
- ICAO flight No.: ETH961
- Call sign: ETHIOPIAN 961
- Registration: ET-AIZ
- Flight origin: Bole International Airport; Addis Ababa, Ethiopia
- 1st stopover: Jomo Kenyatta Int'l Airport; Nairobi, Kenya
- 2nd stopover: Maya-Maya Airport; Brazzaville, Republic of the Congo
- Last stopover: Murtala Mohammed Int'l Airport; Lagos, Nigeria
- Destination: Port Bouet Airport; Abidjan, Côte d'Ivoire
- Occupants: 175 (including 3 hijackers)
- Passengers: 163 (including 3 hijackers)
- Crew: 12
- Fatalities: 125 (including 3 hijackers)
- Injuries: 46
- Survivors: 50

Ethiopian Airlines Flight 961 was a scheduled international flight serving the route Addis Ababa–Nairobi–Brazzaville–Lagos–Abidjan. On 23 November 1996, the aircraft serving the flight, a Boeing 767, was hijacked en route from Addis Ababa to Nairobi by three Ethiopians seeking asylum in Australia. The plane crash-landed in the Indian Ocean near Grande Comore, Comoros Islands, due to fuel exhaustion. Of those onboard, 125 of 175 died in the ditching (water landing), including all three hijackers and six of the 12 crew. It was the first recorded instance of the ditching of a wide-body aircraft.

== Background ==
=== Aircraft ===
The aircraft involved was a Boeing 767-260ER, registered ET-AIZ, c/n 23916, that first flew on 17 September 1987. Powered by two Pratt & Whitney JT9D-7R4E engines, it was delivered new to Ethiopian Airlines on 22 October 1987. Except for a short period between May 1991 and February 1992 when it was leased to Air Tanzania, the airplane spent its life in the Ethiopian Airlines fleet. It was nine years old at the time the hijacking took place.

=== Crew ===
Captain Leul Abate (42), an experienced pilot with over 11,500 total flight hours (including 4,067 hours in the Boeing 757/767), was the pilot-in-command. The first officer on the flight was Yonas Mekuria (34). He had flown more than 6,500 hours, 3,042 of them in the Boeing 757/767.

Prior to the crash, Leul (Note: Ethiopians do not have surnames and are addressed by their given names. Some contemporary news articles refer to the pilots as "Abate" and "Mekuria", which are the names of Leul and Yonas' fathers, or patronymics.) had experienced two previous hijackings. The first occurred 12 April 1992 on Flight 574, a Boeing 727-260. Two hijackers with hand grenades demanded to be taken to Nairobi and onwards to Canada. After a five-hour standoff at Jomo Kenyatta International Airport, the hijackers surrendered. The second occurred on 17 March 1995, flying a Boeing 737-260. Five hijackers demanded to be taken to Libya, and the airplane was diverted to El Obeid, Sudan. There, the hijackers changed their mind and wanted to fly to Sweden instead. However, the Sudanese authorities refused to refuel the aircraft, and after several hours of standoff, the hijackers surrendered. In both cases, the aircraft was undamaged and no one was injured or killed.

== Incident ==
=== Departure ===
The flight had been delayed in order to wait for a connecting flight. The aircraft took off at 08:09 UTC from Addis Ababa.

=== Hijacking ===
At about 08:29 UTC, when the aircraft, referred to as Zulu by Ethiopian Airlines' pilots after the last letter of its registration, was 20 minutes into the flight, three Ethiopian men charged the cockpit and hijacked the aircraft after taking an axe and a fire extinguisher from the cockpit. Ethiopian state-operated radio later identified the hijackers as two unemployed high-school graduates and a nurse; their names were Alemayehu Bekeli Belayneh, Mathias Solomon Belay, and Sultan Ali Hussein; they did not say which of the hijackers was the nurse, which hijacker was which, or what their ages were.

The men threatened to blow up the plane in flight if the pilots did not obey their demands. The hijackers claimed that there were 11 of them when in fact there were only three. After assaulting and forcing first officer Yonas Mekuria into the cabin, they made an announcement. Over the intercom, they declared in Amharic, French and English that if anyone tried to interfere, they had a bomb and they would use it to blow up the plane. Authorities later determined that the purported bomb was actually a covered bottle of liquor.

The hijackers demanded the plane be flown to Australia. Leul tried to explain they had only taken on the fuel needed for the Addis Ababa to Nairobi sector and thus could not even make a quarter of the journey to Australia, but the hijackers did not believe him. One of them pointed to a statement in the fleet page of the airline's in-flight magazine that the maximum flying time of the 767 was 11 hours.

Leul later commented:

[The hijackers] knew they wouldn't make it to Australia – they just wanted us to crash. They should be dead. The way they were talking they didn't want to live.

Instead of flying east towards Australia, the captain followed the African coastline southward. The hijackers noticed that land was still visible and forced the pilot to steer east. Leul secretly headed for the Comoro Islands, which lie midway between Madagascar and the African mainland. During this time, two of the hijackers went into the cabin, with the lead hijacker (as stated in the report) staying in the cockpit.

=== Ditching ===
Sequence showing the ditching of the aircraft; this was recorded by a South African tourist.

The plane was nearly out of fuel as it approached the island group, but the hijackers continued to ignore the captain's warnings. Out of options, Leul began to circle the area, hoping to land the plane at the Comoros' main airport. This forced Leul to land at more than 175 knots (324 km/h; 201 mph).

At 11:41 UTC, the right engine flamed out. The hijacker briefly exited the cabin to talk with the other hijackers. Leul took this opportunity to make use of the aircraft's public address system and made the following announcement:

Ladies and gentlemen this is your pilot, we have run out of fuel and we are losing one engine [at] this time, and we are expecting [a] crash landing and that is all I have to say. We have lost already one engine, and I ask all passengers to react ... to the hijackers

Hearing this, the lead hijacker returned to the cockpit and knocked Leul's microphone out of his hand. Shortly after this, the left engine flamed out, forcing the 767 to glide. The cockpit voice recorder (CVR) then recorded the following (lowercase words were spoken in Amharic while words typed in uppercase were spoken in English):

Leul: "For the sake of my responsibility, AT LEAST the passengers must know the condition.
Hijacker: "Descend it, increase the speed further."

Leul: "It doesn't have any difference. PLEASE. All the same. We are going to die. Why don't you – I thought there is no need to. For the passengers – "

End of recording

Leul's sentence was cut off as the CVR and flight data recorder (FDR) both stopped recording at this point due to both engines having flamed out.

Leul tried to make an emergency landing at Prince Said Ibrahim International Airport on Grande Comore, but a fight with the hijackers at the last minute caused him to lose his visual point of reference, leaving him unable to locate the airport. While still fighting with the hijackers, he tried to ditch the aircraft in shallow waters 500 yards (460 m; 1,500 ft) off Le Galawa Beach Hotel, near Mitsamiouli at the northern end of Grande Comore island. Leul attempted to land parallel with the waves instead of against the waves in an effort to smooth the landing. Seconds prior to contacting the water, the aircraft was banked left some ten degrees; the left engine and wingtip struck the water first. The engine acted as a scoop and struck a coral reef, slowing that side quickly and causing the aircraft to suddenly tilt left. The rest of the aircraft then entered the water unevenly, causing it to cartwheel and break apart. Except for the rear part of the airframe, the broken portions of the fuselage sank rapidly. Many passengers died because they prematurely inflated their life jackets in the cabin, causing them to be trapped inside by the sinking plane.

Island residents and tourists, including a group of scuba divers and some French and Indian doctors on vacation, came to the aid of crash survivors. A tourist recorded a video of ET-AIZ crashing. She said that she had begun taping because she initially believed that the 767 formed a part of an air show for tourists.

=== Medical treatment and repatriation of bodies ===
Survivors were initially taken to Mitsamiouli Hospital, less than 2 kilometres (1.2 mi; 1.1 nmi) away from the crash site. The passengers were transferred to El-Maarouf Regional Hospital Centre in Moroni the same day. The two French people who survived and 19 injured were transported to Réunion. In Réunion, one of the injured died, making the death toll 125. Excluding those transported to Réunion, survivors were transported to Kenya and South Africa.

At the time, there was no mortuary in Moroni, so cold rooms were used to store 124 bodies.

== Investigation ==
Because the aircraft ditched within the territorial waters of the Comoros, the local government held primary jurisdiction over the accident probe under international aviation guidelines. However, on 3 December 1996, the General Directorate of Civil Aviation of the Comoros (French: Direction Générale de l'Aviation Civile des Comores) officially agreed to delegate the technical investigation to the Ethiopian Civil Aviation Authority (ECAA).

The ECAA served as the lead investigative agency, supported by international organizations. The United Kingdom's Air Accidents Investigation Branch (AAIB) took custody of the digital flight data recorder (DFDR) and cockpit voice recorder (CVR), performing the physical readout and analysis of the flight data at their laboratory facility in Farnborough, England. Additional engineering and technical analysis was provided by the United States National Transportation Safety Board (NTSB) and teams from Boeing Commercial Airplanes.

== Fate of the passengers and crew ==
The final accident report includes a listing of surviving and dead passengers and crew. All 12 crew members were Ethiopians. Six survived, including the captain and first officer.

The passengers originated from 36 countries.

The passenger manifest (including hijackers but not crew members) follows:

Nationality	Number on board	Fatalities	Survivors
Austria	1	1	0
Belgium	1	1	0
Benin	2	2	0
Cameroon	2	2	0
Canada	1	1	0
Chad	1	1	0
Congo	5	3	2
Ivory Coast (Côte d'Ivoire)	1	1	0
Djibouti	2	0	2
Egypt	1	1	0
Ethiopia	19	16	3
France	4	2	2
Germany	1	1	0
Hungary	1	1	0
India	20	14	6
Israel	8	7	1
Italy	4	0	4
Japan	2	1	1
Kenya	14	8	6
South Korea	1	1	0
Lesotho	1	0	1
Liberia	2	2	0
Mali	12	9	3
Nigeria	23	19	4
Pakistan	1	1	0
Sierra Leone	1	1	0
Somalia	1	1	0
Sri Lanka	9	9	0
Sweden	2	2	0
Switzerland	1	1	0
Uganda	1	0	1
Ukraine	4	1	3
United Kingdom	7	5	2
United States	5	2	3
Yemen	1	1	0
Zaire (Note: Now known as the Democratic Republic of the Congo.)	1	1	0
Total	163	119	44

Seat map showing dead and surviving passengers and crew. The two pilots are not shown in the figure; they both survived with serious injuries.

The dead passenger count includes the three hijackers. Of the passengers, 42 originated in Mumbai, including:

- 3 Americans
- 9 Nigerians
- 9 Sri Lankans
- 19 Indians

The rest of the passengers originated in Addis Ababa.

Of the 175 passengers and crew members, 125 were killed, including the three hijackers. According to the accident report, all six surviving crew members and 38 passengers received serious injuries, two passengers received minor injuries, and four passengers received no injuries. One passenger, an Ethiopian, was identified as a child on the manifest; this passenger was among the dead.

Many of the passengers survived the initial crash, but they had disregarded, did not understand, or did not hear Leul's warning not to inflate their life jackets inside the aircraft, causing them to be pushed against the ceiling of the fuselage by the inflated life jackets when water flooded in. Unable to escape, they drowned. An estimated 60 to 80 passengers, strapped to their seats, presumably drowned.

Leul and Yonas both survived. For his actions, Leul was awarded the Flight Safety Foundation Professionalism in Flight Safety Award.

=== Notable passengers ===
Among those killed was Mohamed Amin, a wartime photojournalist and publisher of Selamta, Ethiopian Airlines' in-flight magazine. He was believed to be standing near the entrance to the cockpit arguing or negotiating with the hijacker presumed to be guarding the cockpit during the final moments of the flight.

Franklin Huddle, the U.S. Consul General of Bombay at the time, and his wife both survived the crash. Huddle said that he chose to fly on Ethiopian Airlines while planning a safari trip to Kenya because of the airline's reputation; it was one of the few airlines in Africa to have Federal Aviation Administration certification. Huddle wanted a flight during the day, reasoning that flying during the day was "safer". He credits his and his wife's survival to a last-minute upgrade to business class.

CIA operative Leslianne Shedd, of the Seattle metropolitan area, was killed in the crash; initially she was reported to be a State Department employee. A survivor saw her helping other passengers, including an elderly Ethiopian woman, put on their life vests. She was given a star on the CIA Memorial Wall, and the Leslianne Shedd Memorial Fund was established at the University of Washington.

== Maps ==
Location of the crash and the airports

Crash site in the Comoros

== Aftermath ==
A memorial service was held in Galawa on 30 November 1996.

The incident has become a well-known hijacking because of the videotape. This was one of very few large airliner water landings, and it was the first water landing due to hijacking. Both the captain and first officer of the flight received aviation awards, and both continued to fly for Ethiopian Airlines, although Leul considers Yonas, the first officer, the real hero. Yonas fought the hijackers while he himself was bruised and bleeding, giving time for Leul to land the airplane. "He was a life-saver", Leul said.

== In the media ==
1. In 2005, the crash was featured in an episode of the TV show Mayday with the title "Ocean Landing"; the episode is from season 3, episode 13.
2. In 2009, it was featured in the episode "Death Be Not Stupid" of the TV series 1000 Ways to Die; episode 9 from season 1.
3. It was also featured in a 2010 episode of the Biography Channel series I Survived..., in which a survivor told his story of what happened on the plane.

== See also ==
- Air Canada Flight 143
- 1990 Guangzhou Baiyun airport collisions
- Tuninter Flight 1153, an ATR 72 ditched into the Mediterranean Sea after a fuel exhaustion
- US Airways Flight 1549
- Yemenia Flight 626
- Ethiopian Airlines accidents and incidents
- List of airline flights that required gliding
