= Fuel starvation and fuel exhaustion =

Problem affecting internal combustion engines

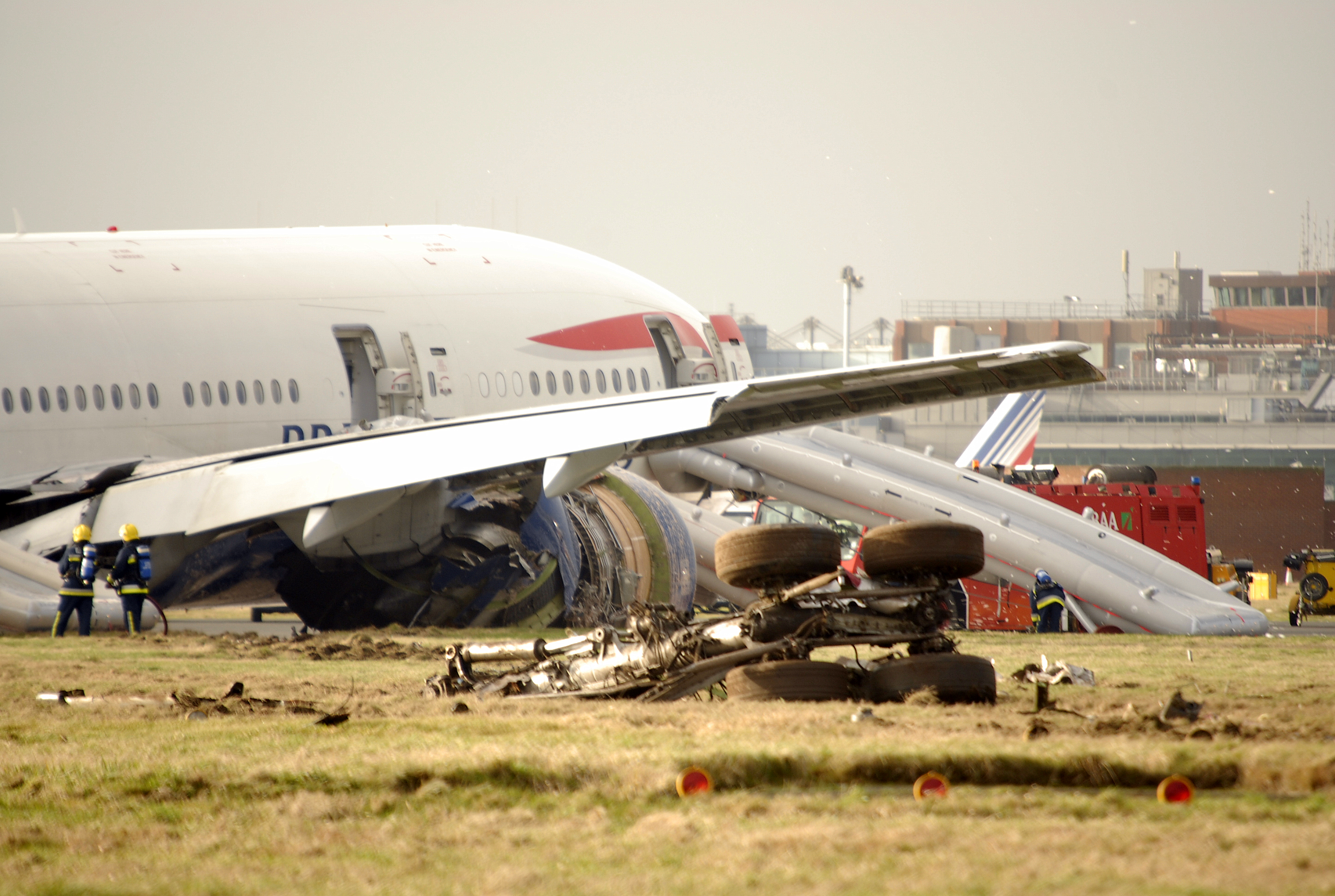
British Airways Flight 38 crash-landed at London Heathrow in 2008 after its engines’ fuel/oil heat exchangers became clogged with ice crystals.

In an internal combustion engine, fuel starvation is the failure of the fuel system to supply sufficient fuel to allow the engine to run properly, for example due to blockage, vapor lock, contamination by water, malfunction of the fuel pump or incorrect operation, leading to loss of power or engine stoppage. There is still fuel in the tank(s), but it is not delivered to the engine(s) in sufficient quantity. By contrast, fuel exhaustion (also called fuel depletion) is an occurrence in which the vehicle in question becomes completely devoid of usable fuel, with results similar to those of fuel starvation.

All modes of transport powered by internal combustion engines can be affected by fuel starvation, although the problem is most serious for aircraft in flight. Watercraft are also at risk, as a drifting vessel cannot maneuver to avoid a collision or prevent itself from running aground. On aircraft, fuel starvation is often the result of incorrect fuel management, for example by selecting to feed the engine from an empty tank while fuel is present in another one.

When the fuel level is low, some aircraft are vulnerable to a specific type of fuel starvation known as unporting, which occurs when hard maneuvers, a steep climb, or a departure from coordinated flight causes the fuel to slosh away from the line leading to an engine. Some aircraft have special operating limitations on steep climbs with low fuel due to this concern.

Aircraft with fuel tank filler caps on the surface of the wings or fuselage are also susceptible to fuel exhaustion if a filler cap is left off or not refitted correctly after removal. On an aircraft in flight, the airflow over the wing or fuselage leads to air pressure outside the fuel tank being lower than inside; as a result fuel can be sucked out of the tank. In addition to improper fitment, lack of maintenance of an aircraft fuel tank filler cap is also an issue. A defective seal on a cap may allow water into the tank when an aircraft is washed or parked outdoors in wet weather, leading to fuel starvation.

== Fuel emergency procedures in aviation ==
Aircraft operators and aviation regulatory authorities have developed various procedures that should be used during a fuel exhaustion situation in flight so that the aircraft maximizes its chances of completing a safe and successful landing.

During flight, if the pilot of their aircraft determines that they are able to follow cleared instructions and successfully complete an approach and landing, but that any further undue delay may result in the aircraft encountering a fuel emergency or landing with less than their calculated final reserve fuel, the pilot shall inform air traffic control by declaring MINIMUM FUEL. This will inform ATC that any further delay might place the aircraft in a fuel emergency situation, however this is only an advisory declaration and gives ATC no obligation or requirements to prioritize that aircraft for an expedited approach or immediate landing.

If during flight, the pilot of their aircraft calculates that they will be landing with less than their final reserve fuel, or that they will encounter a fuel emergency situation, they must inform ATC by declaring MAYDAY MAYDAY MAYDAY, FUEL. As with any other mayday call in aviation, this will be treated as a full emergency and the pilots will be provided all available aid to execute a safe and successful landing. This may include immediate prioritization above all other aircraft traffic, permission to land on any usable runway and preparation of airport emergency services at the airfield.

== Fuel exhaustion and starvation incidents on aircraft ==
Many incidents have happened on aircraft where fuel exhaustion or starvation played a role. A partial list of these incidents follows:

=== 1940s ===
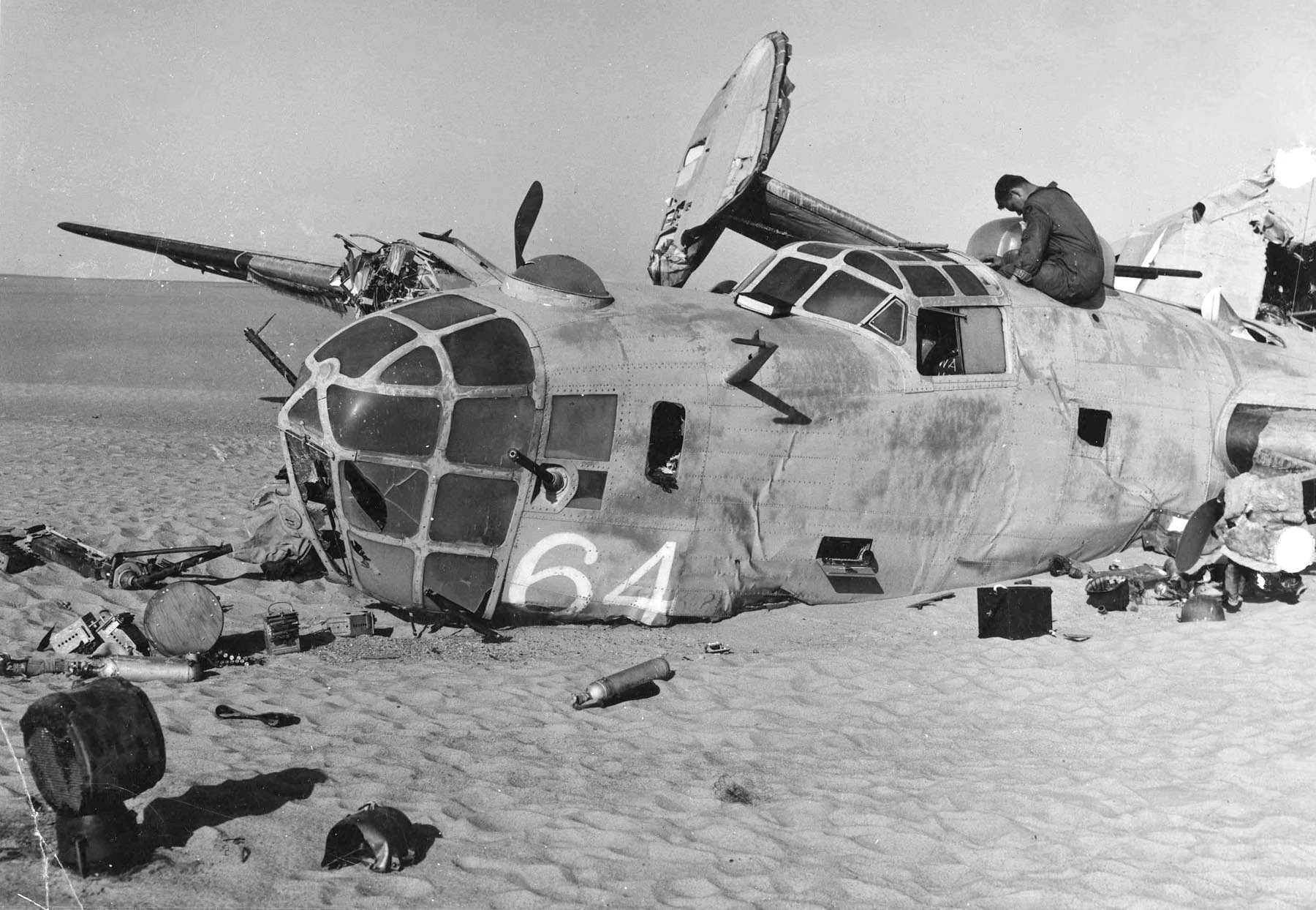
The forward fuselage section of Lady Be Good, a Consolidated B-24 Liberator which crashed in the Libyan Desert after running out of fuel

- On April 4, 1943, Lady Be Good, a Consolidated B-24D Liberator, crashed in the desert of Kufra District, Libya. The aircraft had overflown its intended landing site and continued to fly south for several hours until it exhausted its fuel, whereupon the crew bailed out. Lady Be Good crashed in the desert, splitting into pieces, but remained well-preserved for over a decade and a half before its rediscovery in 1958.

=== 1950s and 1960s ===
- On 19 June 1954, a Convair CV-240 aircraft operated by Swissair registered HB-IRW ran out of fuel over the English Channel near Folkestone. The aircraft ditched in the Channel, killing three passengers. Four crew members and two passengers were found alive after the crash.
- On 3 August 1954, a Lockheed Super Constellation of Air France registered F-BGNA was diverted to Boston after being unable to land at New York-Idlewild Airport due to bad weather. It ran out of fuel before reaching Boston and made a belly landing in a field. There were no fatalities.
- On 21 August 1963, a Tupolev Tu-124 operated by Aeroflot experienced a landing gear malfunction after taking off from Tallinn Airport. On finding that the nose gear could neither be retracted nor extended, the crew diverted the flight to Leningrad where they prepared for an emergency landing by circling the city burning off fuel. While circling the city the crew made repeated attempts to get the landing gear to lock down; they possibly became over-preoccupied with this and the aircraft ran out of fuel. The crew ditched the aircraft in the Neva River. There were no fatalities.
- On 17 November 1964, a Dutch F-104 Starfighter crashed into a mountain in Norway when it ran out of fuel following the death of its pilot. The pilot died due to malfunction of the oxygen mask.
- On 4 June 1967, A British Midland Canadair C-4 Argonaut registered G-ALHG suffered a double engine failure due to a fuel tank selector problem over Stockport, England. The aircraft crashed and 72 of the 84 on board died.

=== 1970s and 1980s ===
- ALM Flight 980 was a Douglas DC-9-33CF flying from John F. Kennedy International Airport in New York City to Princess Juliana International Airport in St. Maarten, in the Netherlands Antilles, on 2 May 1970. Multiple diversions due to severe weather conditions and several unsuccessful landing attempts depleted the aircraft's fuel to the point where the crew believed there was insufficient remaining to reach an alternative airport and decided to ditch the DC-9 in the Caribbean Sea. There were 23 fatalities among the 63 on board.
- On 4 October 1975, a chartered Cessna 310Q crashed on final approach to New Hanover County Airport while transporting wrestlers Bob Bruggers, Ric Flair, Johnny Valentine and Tim Woods and promoter David Crockett to a professional wrestling match in nearby Wilmington, North Carolina. Bruggers and Flair were seriously injured, while Valentine was paralyzed and the charter pilot subsequently died of his injuries. The aircraft was overloaded and its center of gravity was beyond the aft limit; attempting to mitigate these problems, the pilot drained fuel before the flight, and the aircraft consequently ran out of fuel short of the runway.
- On 20 October 1977, the band Lynyrd Skynyrd performed at the Greenville Memorial Auditorium in Greenville, South Carolina, and boarded a Convair CV-240 airplane to take them to Baton Rouge, where they were to perform at Louisiana State University. The plane ran out of fuel near the end of the flight and crashed, killing both pilots and four of the 24 passengers, including the band's lead singer Ronnie Van Zant.
- On 2 December 1977, a Libyan Arab Airlines Tu-154 leased from Balkan Bulgarian Airlines ran out of fuel and crashed near Benghazi, Libya. 59 passengers were killed.
- On 28 December 1978, United Airlines Flight 173, a Douglas DC-8-61 en route from Denver, Colorado, to Portland, Oregon, experienced a landing gear indicator light malfunction while preparing to land. The aircraft continued to circle in the vicinity of Portland while the crew investigated the problem, but it ran out of fuel and crash-landed in a sparsely populated area, killing 10 and seriously injuring 24 of the 181 on board.
- On 23 July 1983, due to a chain of events and mistakes, Air Canada Flight 143, a Boeing 767-200, was fueled using pounds as the unit of measure instead of kilograms, resulting in only half the required amount of fuel being on board. The aircraft used up all available fuel and glided to Gimli Industrial Park Airport where the airliner landed safely. The aircraft (now scrapped) became known as the "Gimli Glider."
- A Cessna 208A Caravan, used for skydiving operations at Jenkinsburg, Georgia, crashed following a loss of engine power just after taking off on 29 September 1985. The aircraft had been refuelled with contaminated fuel; all 17 occupants died.
- After a string of mistakes and omissions by the pilots, a Boeing 737-200 operating Varig Flight 254 on 3 September 1989 strayed hundreds of miles off-course, ran out of fuel, and crashed in Brazil's Amazon jungle killing 13 of the occupants. Due to the crew's mistake in flying the aircraft west (270°) instead of north-northeast (027°), the aircraft was not found until four survivors walked onto a farm two days later.

=== 1990s and 2000s ===
- On 25 January 1990, Avianca Flight 052 was in an extended holding pattern over John F. Kennedy International Airport in New York City due to fog and congested traffic. The Boeing 707-320B was delayed many times before it was given clearance to land, using up almost all of their fuel. On their attempt to land, wind shear, combined with bad visibility caused them to miss the runway and execute a missed approach. However, before Flight 052 could execute another landing attempt, they ran out of fuel and crashed into Cove Neck, New York, killing 73 of 158.
- A McDonnell Douglas F/A-18A Hornet of the Royal Australian Air Force, serial number A21-41, was lost on 5 June 1991 after the pilot became incapacitated. The aircraft flew until it ran out of fuel and crashed in a remote part of Queensland. The wreckage was not found until more than three years later.
- The crew of Indian Airlines Flight 440, an Airbus A300B2-101, executed a missed approach procedure at Hyderabad-Begumpet Airport on 15 November 1993 due to poor visibility. During the missed approach a problem developed when the flaps would not retract fully. After some time trying to solve the flap problem and find somewhere to land near Hyderabad, the crew diverted the aircraft to Madras but because they had to fly slower due to the extended flaps the aircraft ran out of fuel. It landed in a paddy field near Tirupati; there were no fatalities among the 262 occupants but the aircraft was written off.
- On 23 November 1996, three men hijacked Ethiopian Airlines Flight 961 on a short flight segment from Addis Ababa to Nairobi. The hijackers demanded that the aircraft should be flown to Australia despite the pilot telling them that there was insufficient fuel to do so. After three hours of flying along the African coast and across part of the Indian Ocean, the aircraft ran out of fuel and the engines failed. An emergency landing at Grande Comore Island failed when the aircraft landed on the water just off the local beach, killing 125 people including the three hijackers.
- On 25 October 1999, a Learjet 35 ran out of fuel and crashed in a field near Aberdeen, South Dakota. All 4 passengers (including golfer Payne Stewart) and the two crew members died. The crash was a result of the incapacitation of the crew due to hypoxia, caused by a loss of air pressure in the aircraft. Having departed from Orlando, Florida, on a routine flight that should have crossed the Gulf of Mexico to Dallas, Texas, the aircraft flew unmanned for over 1,500 miles before finally running out of fuel.
- On 12 July 2000, Hapag-Lloyd Flight 3378 had a landing gear problem when it failed to fully retract after takeoff. The pilots decided to continue to Munich but did not realise that their lower speed for much the same hourly fuel consumption (required because the landing gear was not up) meant that they had insufficient fuel to do so. Once the aircraft lost all fuel, the crew attempted an emergency landing at Vienna International Airport but the aircraft landed short of the runway. There were no fatalities.
- On 24 August 2001, Air Transat Flight 236 suffered a fuel leak while crossing the Atlantic Ocean and lost its fuel. The aircraft glided safely to an air base in the Azores.
- TAM Airlines Flight 3804, a Fokker 100, suffered fuel exhaustion on 30 August 2002 because of a leak. The aircraft made an emergency landing in a field with its gear up, killing a cow grazing in the field. No one on board the aircraft was killed.
- On 13 August 2004, a Convair CV-580 freighter operating as Air Tahoma Flight 185 suffered fuel starvation due to crew mismanagement of the fuel tank system and crashed, killing one of the pilots.
- On 6 August 2005, Tuninter Flight 1153, an ATR 72 en route from Bari, Italy, to Djerba, Tunisia, ditched into the Mediterranean Sea about 18 miles from the city of Palermo. Sixteen of the 39 people on board died. The accident resulted from fuel exhaustion due to the installation of a fuel quantity indicator for an ATR 42 in the ATR 72; the incorrect indicator was over-reading by over 2,000 kg, leading the crew to believe they had enough fuel for the flight.
- On 14 August 2005, F-16 Fighting Falcons of the Hellenic Air Force intercepted a Boeing 737-300 operating Helios Airways Flight 522 in the vicinity of Athens after the flight failed to respond to air traffic controllers at Athens International Airport. The pilots of the fighter jets reported that they observed no pilots in control of the aircraft until shortly before the aircraft ran out of fuel, when a flight attendant named Andreas Prodromou managed to reach the cockpit and attempted to control the aircraft. By the time Prodromou sat at the controls, the plane had exhausted its fuel and then crashed into a hill on the outskirts of the village of Grammatiko near Marathon, Greece, killing all on board. Fuel exhaustion was the final link in the accident chain, but as a consequence of cabin depressurization which had disabled the flight crew.
- On 26 June 2007, a Skippers Aviation Embraer EMB 120 Brasilia on a charter flight was executing a go-around at Jundee Airstrip in Western Australia. During the go-around the crew experienced difficulties in controlling the aircraft, with the aircraft descending to 50 feet above the ground and the bank angle reaching 40 degrees. After regaining control, the crew realised that the left engine had stopped. The cause of the engine stoppage was fuel starvation.
- On 1 February 2008, Lloyd Aéreo Boliviano Flight 301, a Boeing 727-259 (registration CP-2429) suffered a fuel exhaustion and landed 4.2 km short of the runway of Teniente Jorge Henrich Arauz Airport, in Trinidad, Bolivia, after deviating from Captain Aníbal Arab Airport, in Cobija, Pando, due to adverse weather conditions; no fatalities; aircraft damaged beyond repair.
- On 17 January 2008, ice crystals in the fuel lines of British Airways Flight 38 melted and refroze within the fuel-oil heat exchangers of the Rolls-Royce Trent 800 engines. The ensuing fuel starvation critically reduced engine power on short final into London Heathrow Airport, and the Boeing 777-236ER landed just short of the runway. All 152 passengers and crew on board survived, but the aircraft was written off, the first hull loss recorded for the Boeing 777.

=== 2010 and later ===
- On 28 November 2016, LaMia Flight 2933, an Avro RJ85 transporting a Brazilian football team that was going to compete in the 2016 Copa Sudamericana Finals in Medellín, Colombia, ran out of fuel; the planned flight involved a refueling point in the Bolivian city of Cobija but the crew decided to fly directly to Medellín after the aircraft was delayed before departure. The passengers on board the aircraft were mainly players and staff of the Chapecoense football club and members of the news media. The aircraft crashed 10 nautical miles south of the runway at Medellín’s José María Córdova International Airport, killing 71 of the 77 people on board.
- On 12 June, 2025, Air India Flight 171, a Boeing 787-8 Dreamliner, descended immediately after takeoff from Ahmedabad Airport and crashed into the campus of the B. J. Medical College in Ahmedabad, killing all but one of the 230 passengers, all 12 crew members, and an additional 19 people on the ground. On 8 July 2025, India's Aircraft Accident Investigation Bureau issued a preliminary report attributing the accident to fuel starvation caused by the fuel control switches having been moved from the "RUN" to "CUTOFF" position. The cause of the switch movement remains under investigation.

== Abandoned in-flight aircraft ==
A number of aircraft have been abandoned by their crew (both intentionally and sometimes accidentally) when the aircraft has continued on its own until fuel exhaustion caused it to crash:

- Some time between midnight and dawn on 5 April 1943, the crew of a Consolidated B-24D Liberator named Lady Be Good lost over the Sahara Desert abandoned their aircraft as it was running out of fuel. The aircraft was found in 1959, with the bodies of most of the crew located in 1960. One crew member's body has never been found.
- On 22 October 1987, the pilot of British Aerospace Harrier GR5 serial number ZD325 accidentally ejected from his aircraft over Wiltshire, England; the aircraft continued on its own until fuel exhaustion caused it to crash into the Irish Sea. The pilot was killed.
- On 4 July 1989, the pilot of a Soviet Mikoyan-Gurevich MiG-23, presuming he had engine problems, ejected from his aircraft. The aircraft continued on its own, flying out of the former East Germany into the West German Air Defence Zone and was then escorted by United States Air Force F-15s until it ran out of fuel and crashed into a house in Belgium, killing the occupant of the house.

== See also ==
- List of airline flights that required gliding
