= Impact of culture on aviation safety =

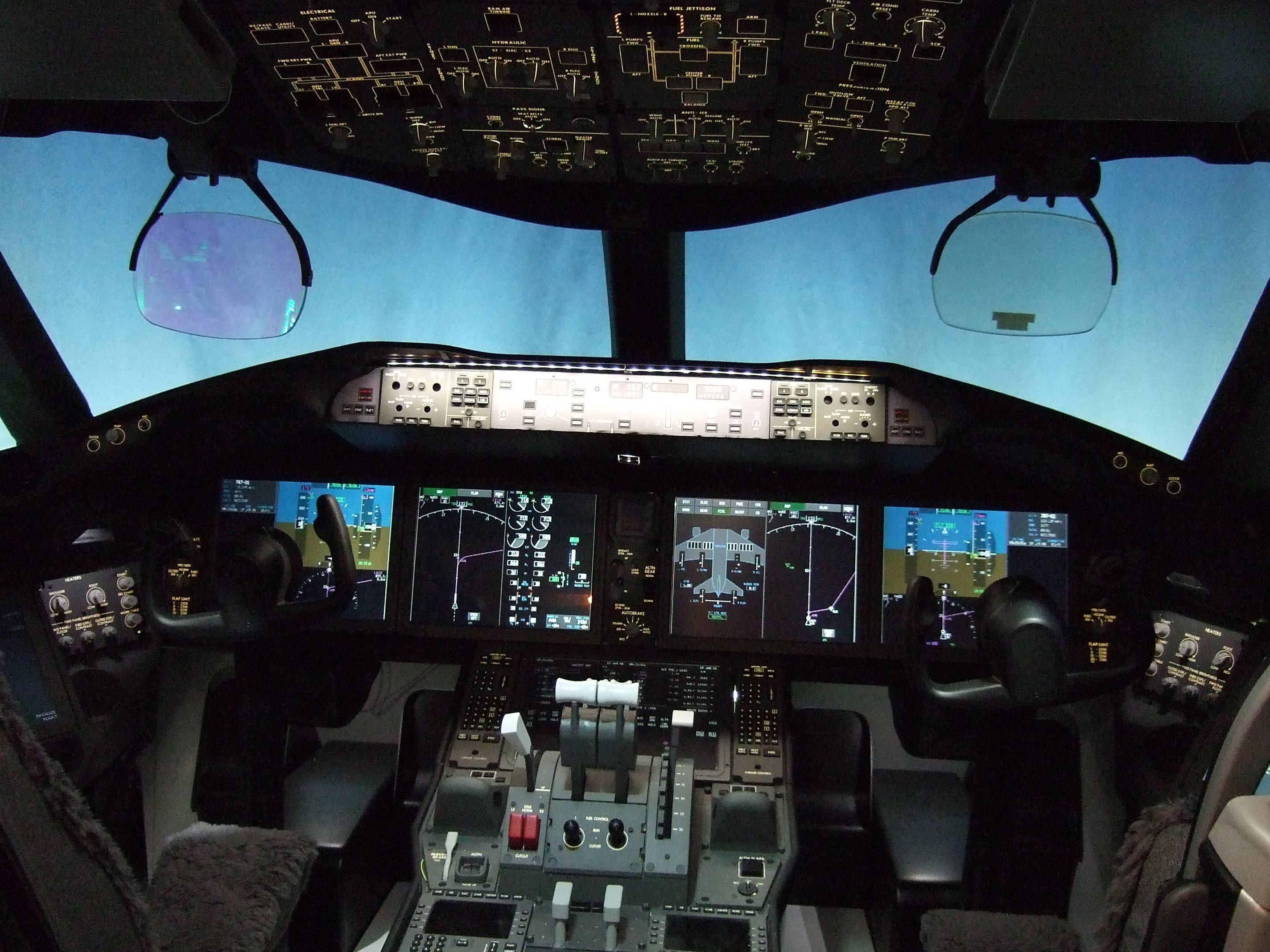
Cockpit of a Boeing 787

Culture can affect aviation safety through its effect on how the flight crew deals with difficult situations; cultures with lower power distances and higher levels of individuality can result in better aviation safety outcomes. In higher power cultures subordinates are less likely to question their superiors. The crash of Korean Air Flight 801 in 1997 was attributed to the pilot's decision to land despite the junior officer's disagreement, while the crash of Avianca Flight 052 was caused by the failure to communicate critical low-fuel data between pilots and controllers, and by the failure of the controllers to ask the pilots if they were declaring an emergency and assist the pilots in landing the aircraft. The crashes have been blamed on aspects of the national cultures of the crews.

== Cultural differences in aviation ==
Geert Hofstede classified national cultures into six dimensions, two of which can be applied to the flight deck: power-distance, which defines the "nature of relations between subordinates and superiors", or "how often subordinates are afraid to express disagreement"; and whether the culture is collectivist or individualist in nature. Western cultures are individualistic and have a low power-distance, whereas most Asian and Latin cultures lie towards the opposite end of the spectrum. Low power-distance and high individualism in Western culture may have contributed to a better safety record than in Taiwan and India. In a more collectivist society like Taiwan, a possible explanation for this might be that personal decision-making skills are not as developed. In Western society, the power-distance is lower in general; "making decisions, implementing them, and taking responsibility for their consequences" is part of their life, making personal decisions easier to make.

== Past incidents ==
=== Tenerife airport disaster ===
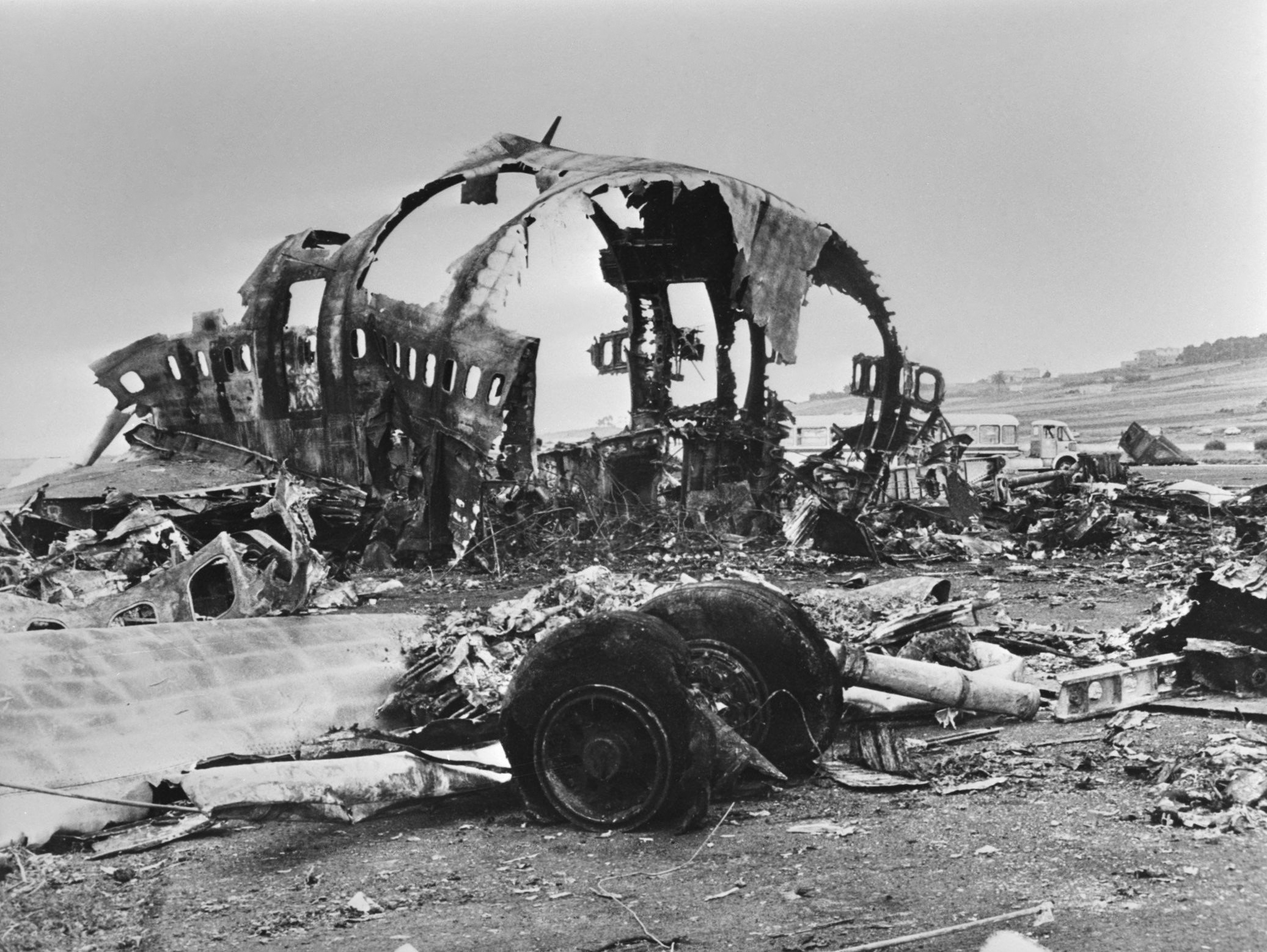
Wreckage of Tenerife airport disaster

On March 27, 1977, two Boeing 747 passenger jets, KLM Flight 4805 and Pan Am Flight 1736, collided on the foggy runway at Los Rodeos Airport (now Tenerife North Airport), on the Spanish island of Tenerife, Canary Islands, killing 583 people in the deadliest accident in aviation history. During the KLM's prematurely initiated takeoff roll, the KLM flight engineer expressed to the Captain and First Officer his concern about the Pan Am not being clear of the runway by asking, "Is he not clear, that Pan American?" The KLM captain emphatically replied "Oh, yes" and continued with the takeoff, snubbing the junior officer's concern. This event led to widespread establishment of crew resource management as a fundamental part of airline pilots' training.

=== Korean Air Flight 801 ===
Animation of Korean 801 on approach

On approach to Guam in 1997, Korean Air Flight 801 crashed, mainly due to pilot fatigue and poor communication between the flight crew. The captain made the decision to land despite the junior officer's disagreements, eventually bringing the plane down short of the runway, highlighting how a pilot-in-command can contribute to a disaster. In high power-distance cultures, it is uncommon for subordinates to question their superiors. "Leaders may be autocratic". High power-distance can be seen as the willingness to be in an unequal position, making it a challenge for an officer lower in the hierarchy to question the decisions of the one in power. At the same time, even in a high uncertainty avoidance culture, with the crew more likely to follow standard operating procedures (SOPs), the crew might react less efficiently to a novel situation.

=== Avianca Flight 052 ===
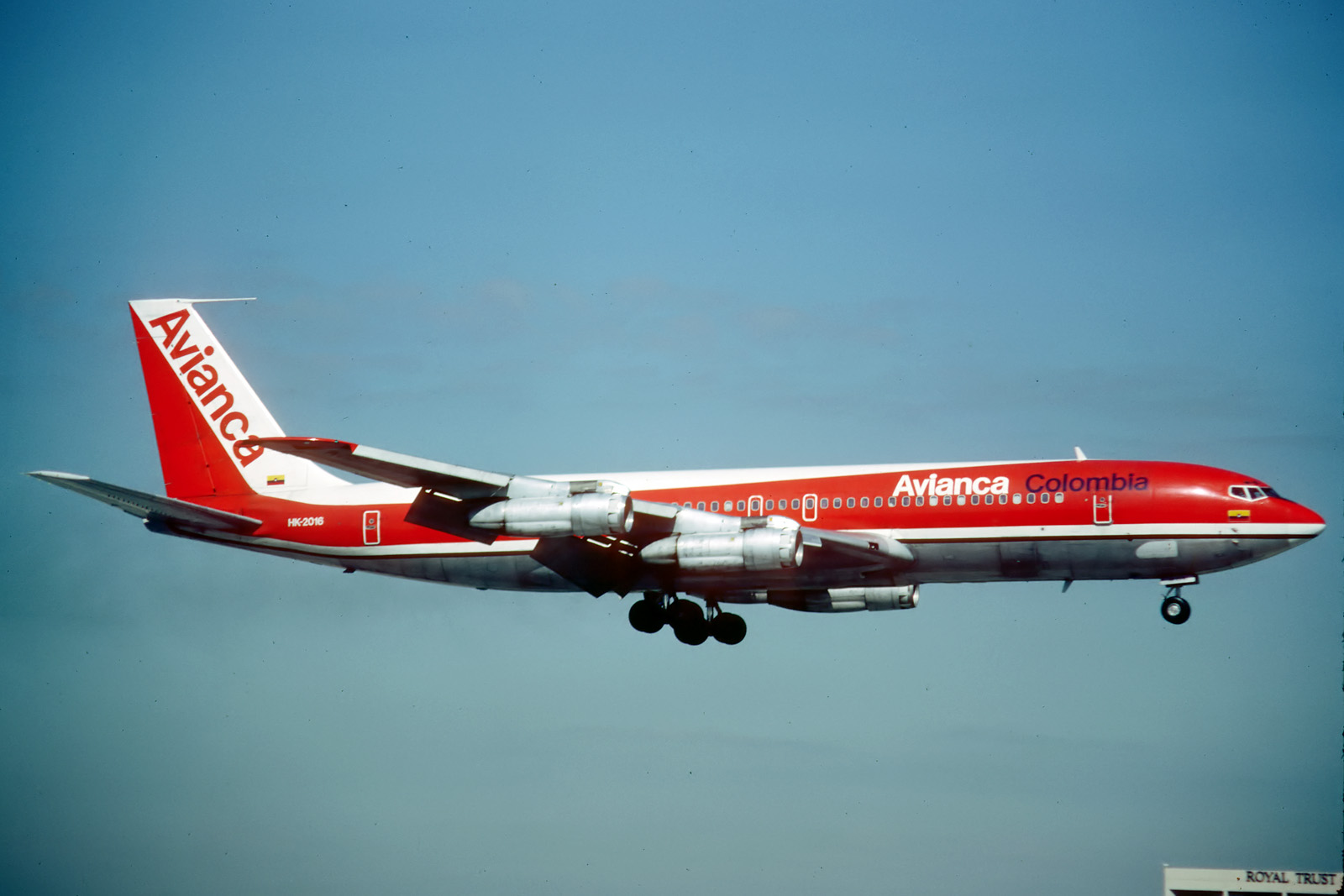
HK-2016, the Boeing 707 involved in the Avianca 052 crash.

Avianca Flight 052 from Bogotá to New York crashed after running out of fuel, a problem caused by language and cultural barriers. Both crew spoke Spanish as their primary language, but the first officer had better proficiency in English. "Colombia is a highly masculine, high power-distance, and collectivist country", which might have led to the crew's reluctance to ask for help from the New York controllers when they knew they were in trouble.

=== Japan Air Lines Cargo Flight 1045 ===
In 1977, Japan Air Lines Cargo Flight 1045 (a cargo aircraft) crashed shortly after takeoff from Anchorage en route to Tokyo, killing all 3 crew. The captain was a US national, with the other two being Japanese. Neither Japanese pilot mentioned the captain's intoxication or stopped him from flying the plane. They were reluctant to do so, and given Japan's moderately high power-distance index, their deference to authority could have been a major contributing factor. Had they done so, it would have humiliated the captain, who was clearly their superior, and from there on, it was impossible "to prevent the captain from taking control of the aircraft, even at the cost of an accident."

=== Germanwings Flight 9525 ===
In 2015, Germanwings Flight 9525 was crashed intentionally into the French Alps by first officer Andreas Lubitz after the captain left the cockpit for a bathroom break; the captain was then locked out. Commentators noted cultural factors that indirectly led to the crash, including Germany's strong protection of privacy and the perception that German regulations could do no wrong. Germany's privacy laws usually inhibit a physician from disclosing a patient's medical history to a third party, as was the case with Lubitz, who never disclosed his mental health issues with his employer Lufthansa (who owned Germanwings).

== Other impacts of culture in airline safety ==
Although crew resource management (CRM) can improve safety in the aviation industry, it is not widely accepted across all cultures. This is likely due to differences in uncertainty avoidance, or "the need for rule-governed behavior and clearly defined procedures". Standard operating procedures are more easily accepted in high uncertainty avoidance cultures, such as Greece, Switzerland, Korea, and some Latin American cultures. In the United States, however, where flexibility is emphasized, pilots may not be as accepting of CRM culture.

Improvements can be made to CRM by drawing on the strengths of both individualistic and collectivisic cultures. Western assertiveness can be helpful in developing a low power-distance cockpit, while the Eastern interdependence brings cooperation, interdependence, and communication to create a safer flying environment.

Ideally, "CRM represents low power-distance (free exchange of information among the crew) and collectivism (recognition and acceptance of crew interdependence), a rare cultural combination."

== See also ==
- Index of aviation articles
