= 1977 Libyan Arab Airlines Tu-154 crash =

1977 aviation accident over Libya

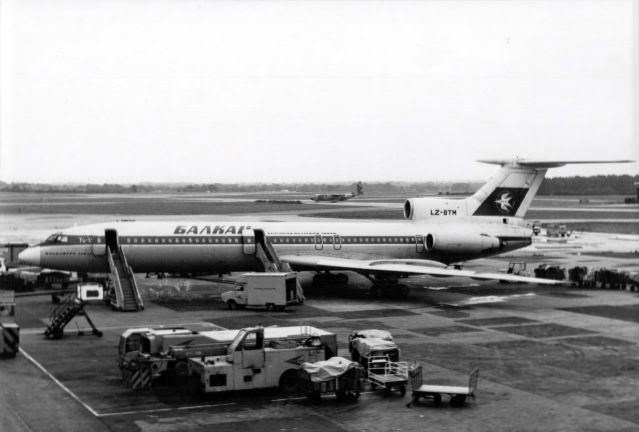
- LZ-BTM, a similar aircraft to the one involved

Accident
- Date: 2 December 1977
- Summary: Forced landing after fuel exhaustion
- Site: Near Benghazi, Libya; 32.10456°N 20.370432°E

Aircraft
- Aircraft type: Tupolev Tu-154
- Operator: Libyan Arab Airlines leased from Balkan Bulgarian Airlines
- Registration: LZ-BTN
- Flight origin: Jiddah International Airport, Saudi Arabia
- Destination: Benina International Airport, Libya
- Occupants: 165
- Passengers: 159
- Crew: 6
- Fatalities: 59
- Survivors: 106

On 2 December 1977, a Tupolev Tu-154 passenger jet ran out of fuel and made a forced landing near Benghazi, Libya. A total of 59 passengers were killed.

== Aircraft ==
The aircraft was a Tu-154A registered LZ-BTN and had its first flight in 1974. It was one of six Tu-154s to be leased by Libyan Arab Airlines from Balkan Bulgarian Airlines for that year's pilgrim flights to Mecca for the Hajj.

== Accident ==
The aircraft took off from Jiddah International Airport in Saudi Arabia on a flight to Benina International Airport in the Libyan city of Benghazi with a crew of six and 159 passengers – pilgrims returning to Libya from the Hajj – on board. Egyptian airspace was closed to Libyan aircraft at the time, necessitating an indirect route to Benghazi instead of the direct route across Egypt; the crew reportedly did not plan for the longer flight time, leaving the aircraft short of fuel. As the aircraft neared Benghazi, heavy fog blanketed the airport and the pilots could not land the aircraft. After failing to locate the alternate airport, the aircraft ran out of fuel and made a forced landing, killing 59 out of the 165 on board.

== See also ==
- Avianca Flight 052
