= Tuninter Flight 1153 =

2005 aviation accident in the Mediterranean Sea

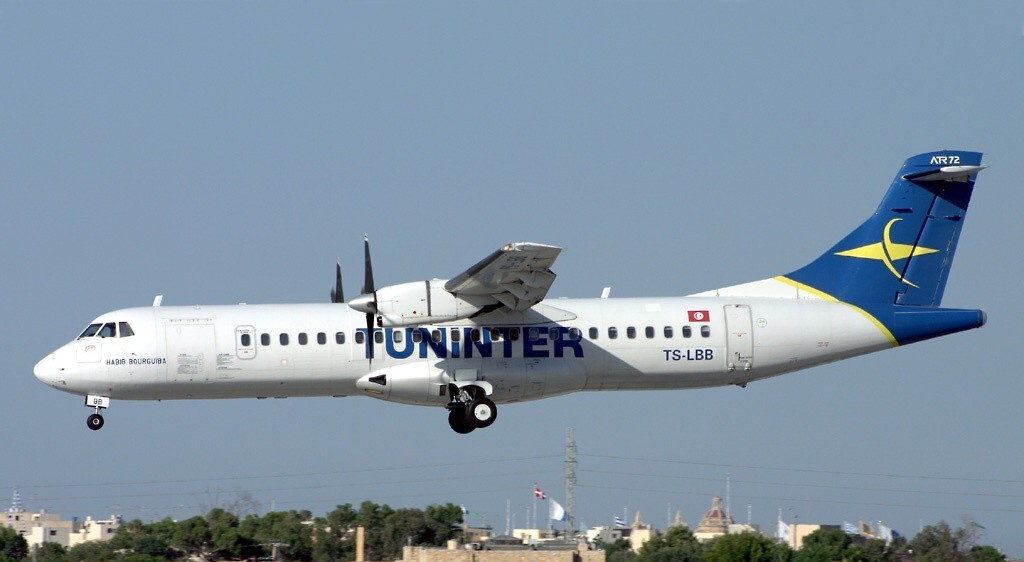
- TS-LBB, the aircraft involved in the accident, seen in 2004

Accident
- Date: 6 August 2005
- Summary: Ditched in the sea following fuel exhaustion
- Site: Mediterranean Sea near Sicily; 38°24′16″N 13°27′30″E

Aircraft
- Aircraft type: ATR 72–202
- Aircraft name: Habib Bourguiba
- Operator: Tuninter
- IATA flight No.: UG1153
- ICAO flight No.: TUI1153
- Call sign: TUNINTER 1153
- Registration: TS-LBB
- Flight origin: Bari International Airport, Italy
- Destination: Djerba-Zarzis Airport, Tunisia
- Occupants: 39
- Passengers: 35
- Crew: 4
- Fatalities: 16
- Injuries: 11
- Survivors: 23

Tuninter Flight 1153 was a scheduled international passenger flight flown by Tuninter Airlines from Bari International Airport in Italy, to Djerba-Zarzis Airport on the Tunisian island of Djerba. On 6 August 2005, the Tuninter ATR 72 ditched into the Mediterranean Sea about 18 miles (29 km) from the city of Palermo. Sixteen of the 39 people on board died. The accident resulted from fuel exhaustion due to the installation of fuel quantity indicators designed for the ATR 42 in the larger ATR 72. It was also Tuninter's first fatal accident in the 14-year history of the company.

== History ==
The flight was under the command of 45-year-old Captain Chafik al-Gharbi (Arabic: شفيق الغربي), a skilled and experienced pilot with a total of 7,182 flight hours. The co-pilot, 28-year-old Ali Kebaier Lassoued (علي كبيّر لسود, also known as Ali Kebaier al-Aswad), had logged 2,431 flight hours. Both the captain and co-pilot were well-acquainted with the ATR 72, having accrued 5,582 hours and 2,130 hours in it, respectively.

The aircraft, an ATR 72–202, had its fuel quantity indicator (FQI) replaced the night before the flight, but technicians inadvertently installed an FQI designed for the ATR 42, a similar but smaller airplane with smaller fuel tanks. Ground crews and the flight engineer, relying on the incorrect readings from the newly installed FQI, loaded the aircraft with an inadequate amount of fuel for the flight.

On the flight from Bari to Djerba, both engines cut out in mid-flight. The aircraft's right engine failed at 23,000 feet (7,000 metres). The aircraft began to descend to 17,000 feet, but 100 seconds after the right engine failure, the left engine also failed at 21,900 feet (6,700 metres). The flight crew did not detect the fuel exhaustion because the incorrectly-installed ATR 42 gauge indicated an adequate amount of fuel in the tanks, even after all of the usable fuel had been consumed. After the engine failure, the captain requested an emergency landing in Palermo, Sicily. The crew tried repeatedly but unsuccessfully to restart the engines as they navigated to Palermo. The ATR glided for 16 minutes, but was unable to reach the runway and the plane was forced to ditch into the sea, 23 nautical miles (43 kilometres; 26 miles) northeast of Palermo International Airport at a speed of 145 mph (126 kn; 65 m/s; 233 km/h). The aircraft broke into three sections upon impact.

The entire aircraft floated for some time after the crash, but only the central fuselage and the wings remained floating. Patrol boats from Palermo arrived 46 minutes after the ditching and began the rescue and recovery.

== Aircraft ==
The aircraft involved, manufactured in 1991, was a 14-year-old twin-engine turboprop ATR 72-200 with aircraft registration TS-LBB. The aircraft was powered by two Pratt & Whitney Canada PW124B engines.

== Passengers ==
Green icons indicate survivors, red marks fatalities. The flight deck fatality was an engineer who was flying as a passenger but was called to the flight deck by the captain.

One of the four crew members died—a flight attendant—and 15 out of the 35 passengers died. The engineer who died was not a part of the flight crew, but had been called to the flight deck by the pilot and copilot after both engines failed; because he was not officially part of the crew, his death was accounted for as a passenger death. The flight's other flight attendants survived. All of the paying passengers were Italian, while the crew and the engineer were Tunisian. Autopsies indicated that many of the dead succumbed to the impact. Autopsies established that eight passengers who received injuries during the impact were unable to escape from the aircraft due to their injuries and drowned. Most of the survivors were seated in the rear of the ATR 72, while most of the passengers who died were in the front. Three dead passengers, including the engineer who tried to help the plane's crew, were found on the seabed. The ANSV stated that the cause of death of these passengers was difficult to determine.

Passengers and crew by nationality
Nationality	Passengers	Crew	Total
Italy	34	0	34
Tunisia	1	4	5
Total	35	4	39

== Investigation ==
The investigation revealed several factors leading to the crash. First, the investigation examined how the incorrect fuel quantity indicator (FQI) came to be installed on the plane.

The final report on the crash notes that during a flight the day before the incident, the captain (who was also flying during the incident) became aware that the FQI on the aircraft dashboard was not working correctly and reported the problem. That evening, the FQI was replaced, but with an FQI that was intended for the ATR 42, a different model of aircraft. The correct FQI was not found because its part number had been entered into the database in a different format than was searched for, and the inventory database mistakenly indicated that the ATR 42 part could be used on both models of aircraft. The FQI for the two aircraft models have different markings on the faceplate, though the difference was not noticed. Second, the investigation examined the fueling of the plane. On the day of the incident, the aircraft was fueled for the flights from Tunis to Bari and Bari to Djerba based on calculations using incorrect readings from the FQI. Because of differences in the shape of the fuel tanks, the incorrect FQI indicated a larger volume of fuel than the tanks held. When fueling the aircraft in Tunis, neither the refueling operator nor the flight engineer noticed the difference between the amount of fuel loaded and the change in reading on the FQI.

The investigation also found that when departing from Tunis on the Tunis-Bari route taken before Flight 1153, the captain noticed by reading his cockpit displays that the aircraft's fuel level seemed to have increased overnight, but did not find a corresponding refueling slip. However, he accepted the explanation that the slip had been kept by a previous crew, though the aircraft had not been flown nor refueled since the day before. Because the aircraft had been fueled for two flights, the flight from Tunis to Bari was uneventful. In Bari, the plane took additional fuel to a level where the incorrect indicator showed 2,700 kilograms. The correct indicator would have shown that there were just 540 kilograms in the tanks when departing for the Bari-Djerba route, insufficient to reach the destination.

Finally, the investigation examined the flight after the engines had failed. During an engine flameout, crews must feather the propellers to reduce the drag on the blades so the plane can glide a farther distance. While the propellers of the aircraft were found fully feathered after the crash, the crew did not feather them, because they were attempting to restart the engines (as per the checklist at the time). Furthermore, as a result of their efforts to restart the engines, the crew did not glide the aircraft at the optimum speed to extend the gliding distance.

Simulation results suggested that, handled optimally, the ATR could have reached Palermo with the tailwind of that day. Two crews flew a simulator at ATR's facility in France from the same starting conditions. By feathering the propellers and reducing the speed to the optimal gliding speed, one made a landing at Palermo, and the other one ditched a mile short of the runway. The fundamental difference was that the simulator pilots knew there was no fuel available and responded accordingly. In contrast, the captain of the Tuninter ATR – whose FQI showed sufficient fuel remained – focused initially on trying to restart the engines in the hope they would respond. When the engines could not be restarted, the captain then focused on selecting a place to ditch the aircraft. Unlike the simulator pilots, Gharbi had a lack of instruments and experienced radio interruptions. The final investigative report suggested that airlines train their pilots to deal with unusual situations.

== Aftermath ==
Tuninter compensated each family of a victim or survivor with €20,000. On 7 September 2005, the Italian government banned Tuninter from flying into Italian airspace. Tuninter rebranded itself as Tunisair Express and had scheduled flights into Italy again as of 2007.

=== Criminal conviction ===
In March 2009, an Italian court sentenced the pilot, Chafik al-Gharbi, to 10 years in prison for manslaughter. Prosecutors said that after the plane's engines stopped functioning, al-Gharbi succumbed to panic, started praying, and failed to follow emergency procedures, and that he could possibly have reached runway 25 of Falcone–Borsellino Airport, or even the standard runway 20. Six others, including the co-pilot as well as the chief operating officer of Tuninter Airlines, were sentenced to between eight and 10 years. By 2009, they had not started serving time, pending the appeals process. The International Federation of Air Line Pilots' Associations (IFALPA) protested the flight crews' criminal sentences, calling the investigation "injustice" and the sentences "flawed." In April 2012, the court of Palermo, Italy, reduced the sentences of seven of the Tunisian airline personnel charged. Following their second appeal to the court, al-Gharbi received six years and eight months, with the others received reduced sentences between 5½ years to 6 years.

The criminal investigation and subsequent sentencing caused considerable controversy in Tunisia and, to a lesser extent, in the civil aviation world. The official investigation was accused of being one-sided and of ignoring mistakes made by Italian air traffic controllers. Unedited cockpit recordings leaked to the public demonstrated the Palermo air traffic controller as having a poor grasp of English, failing to assign the distressed flight its own radio frequency on which to communicate, and giving the pilots incomplete and/or useless information about their position. These cockpit recordings were omitted from the official investigation report.

== Dramatization ==
The crash was featured in the 2009 episode "Falling Fast", of the Canadian-made, internationally distributed documentary series Mayday.

It is featured in season 1, episode 1, of the TV show Why Planes Crash.

== See also ==
- List of airline flights that required gliding
