= Flight watch =

Flight Watch was the common name in the United States for an En route Flight Advisory Service (EFAS) dedicated to providing weather to and collecting reports from pilots while in flight.

While U.S. Flight Service Stations (FSS) operated Flight Watch, Flight Watch did not provide a full range of FSS services such as filing flight plans, acquiring preflight weather briefings, providing NOTAMs, or picking up IFR clearances; instead, it was limited to the following:

- en route weather updates
- collection of pilot weather reports (PIREPs)

The service was available on a single common frequency, 122.0 MHz, to flights operating below Flight Level 180 (18,000 feet MSL) across the conterminous United States. Discrete frequencies were available for high altitude aircraft (at and above 18,000 feet MSL, or FL180), based on location. Flight Watch may have been unavailable below 5,000 feet AGL, depending on terrain and the distance from the nearest station.

On October 1, 2015, Flight Watch services were consolidated with existing Flight Service Station (FSS) services and the services were terminated on the 122.0 frequency. The frequency was monitored for a "few months" to steer pilots to the correct frequency.

== See also ==
- Flight Service Station
