= Air Tahoma Flight 185 =

2004 aviation accident in Kentucky

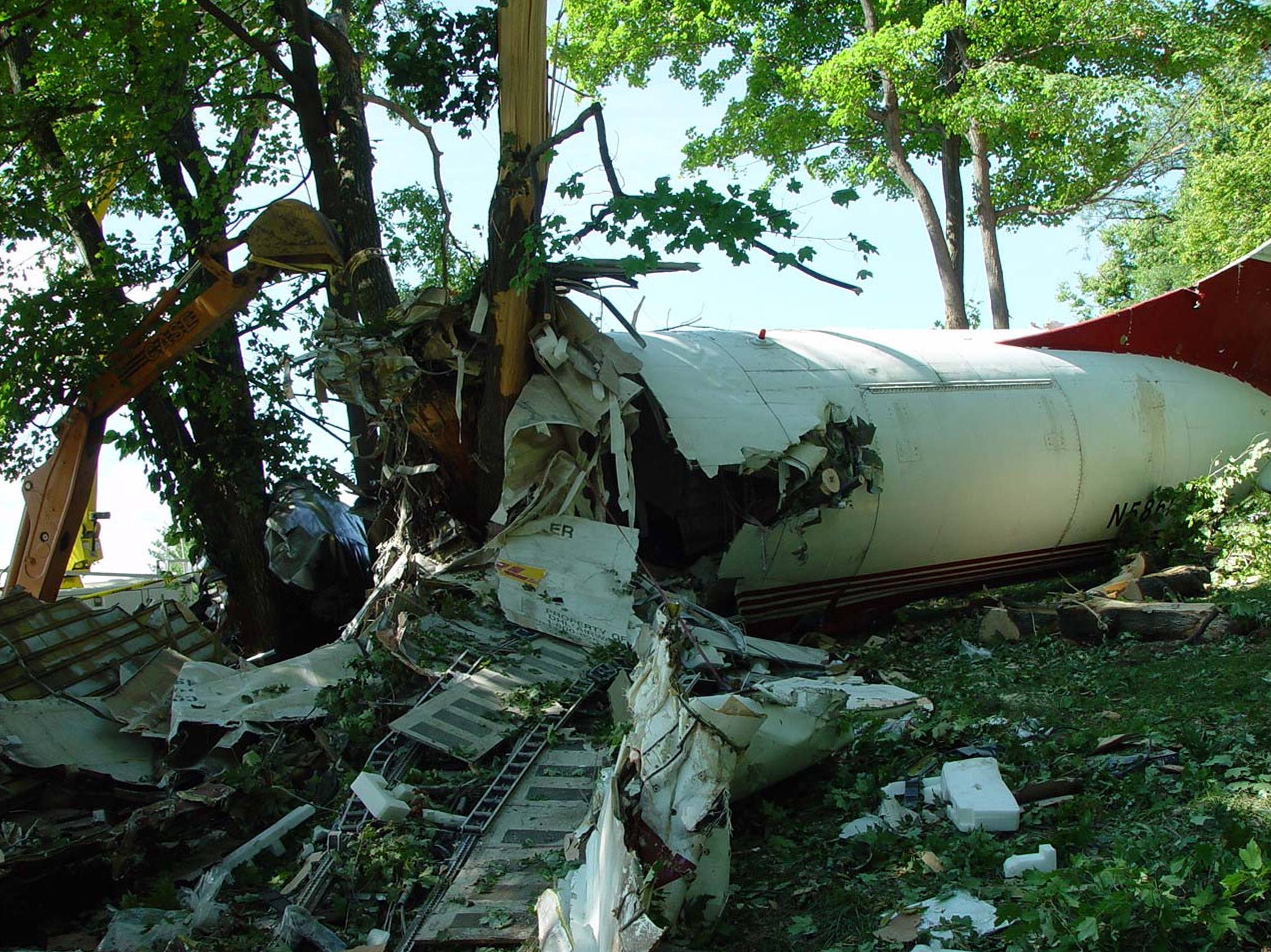
- Wreckage of the aircraft's rear fuselage

Accident
- Date: August 13, 2004
- Summary: Fuel starvation due to pilot error
- Site: World of Sports golf course, Florence, Kentucky, United States; 39°00′32″N 84°38′48″W

Aircraft
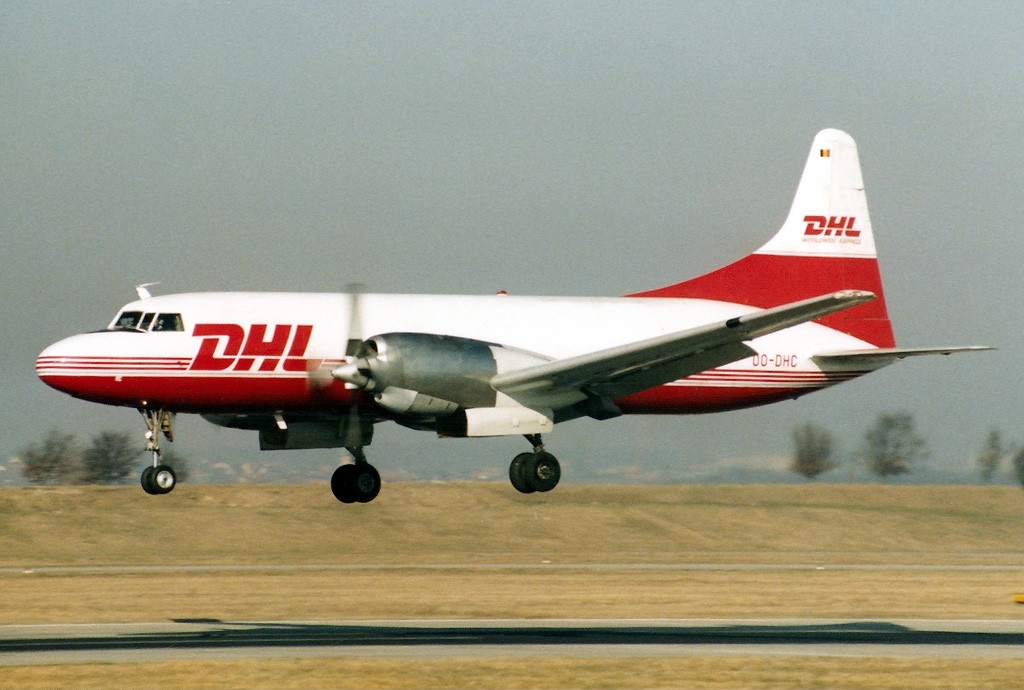
- The aircraft involved in the accident, pictured in 1989 with a previous registration
- Aircraft type: Convair 580
- Operator: Air Tahoma on behalf of DHL Aviation
- ICAO flight No.: HMA185
- Call sign: TAHOMA 185
- Registration: N586P
- Flight origin: Memphis International Airport
- Destination: Cincinnati/Northern Kentucky International Airport
- Occupants: 2
- Crew: 2
- Fatalities: 1
- Injuries: 1
- Survivors: 1

Air Tahoma Flight 185 was a scheduled cargo flight from Memphis to Cincinnati/Northern Kentucky International Airport conducted by Air Tahoma as part of a contract to freight parcels for courier firm DHL Aviation. On August 13, 2004, the flight crashed during approach to landing just one mile (1.6 km) short of the runway. The Convair 580, which is a twin engine turboprop, was destroyed upon impact. The first officer was killed and the captain received minor injuries.

== Background ==
=== Aircraft ===
The aircraft involved in this accident was a 51-year-old Convair 580, manufactured in 1953, serial number 068, with 67,886 flight hours. the accident aircraft was originally meant to be a Convair 340/440. The aircraft featured two Allison 501-D13D turbopropeller engines.

=== Crew ===
On board the aircraft were two crew members.

The captain was 49-year old Bruno Pichelli, who had been hired by Air Tahoma on July 19, 2004, with 2,500 flight hours, of which, 1,337 hours were on the Convair 580.

The first officer was 37-year old Michael Gelwicks, who was hired by Air Tahoma on May 5, 2004, with 2,488 flight hours, 145 of those were on the Convair 580.

== Crash ==
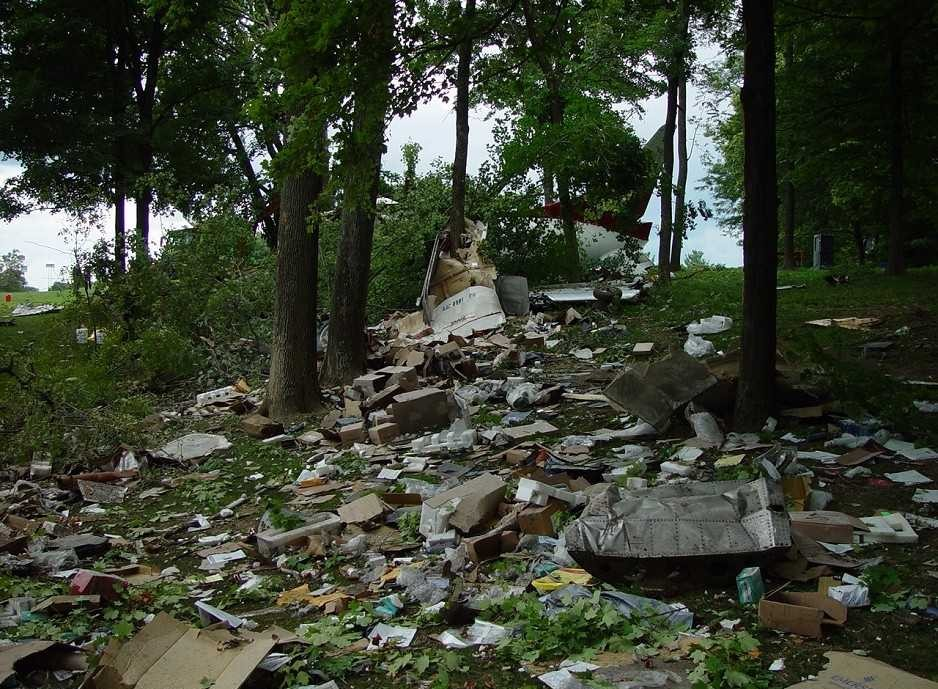
Overview of crash site

On August 13, 2004, at about 00:49 Eastern Daylight Time, Air Tahoma, Inc., Flight 185 crashed about one mile south of Cincinnati/Northern Kentucky International Airport (CVG), in Florence, Kentucky while on approach to runway 36R. The crash was heard by a nearby Florence Police officer. Shortly after, first responders found the plane. The airplane was destroyed by impact forces. The flight was operating as a cargo flight for DHL Aviation from Memphis International Airport to CVG. Visual meteorological conditions prevailed for the flight, which operated on an instrument flight rules flight plan.

== Official investigation ==
The National Transportation Safety Board determined that the probable cause of this accident was fuel starvation resulting from the captain's decision not to follow approved fuel crossfeed procedures. Different output pressure settings on the fuel boost pumps coupled with the open crossfeed valve resulted in both engines drawing fuel from the left tank. All of the fuel from the airplane's left tank that was not used by the engines was transferred into the right tank due to the pressure differential between the boost pumps. During the airplane's descent to landing, the fuel in the left fuel tank became exhausted. Both engine-driven fuel pumps drew air from the exhausted left tank into the fuel system, resulting in a dual-engine flameout.

Contributing to the accident were the captain's inadequate preflight planning, his subsequent distraction during the flight, and his late initiation of the in-range checklist. Further contributing to the accident was the flight crew's failure to monitor the fuel gauges and to recognize that the airplane's changing handling characteristics were caused by a fuel imbalance.

== In popular culture ==
The accident was covered in season 25, episode 2 of the Canadian documentary series, Mayday, titled "Running on Empty".
