= New Man (Christian magazine) =

American Christian men's magazine

- Cover of November/December 1999 issue with Franklin Graham
- Categories: Christian Men's Magazine
- Frequency: was bi-monthly print; now weekly online
- Publisher: Stephen Strang
- Total circulation: 100 000 - 400 000
- Founded: 1994
- Final issue: 2008
- Company: Strang Communications Company
- Country: USA
- Based in: Lake Mary, Florida
- Language: American English
- Website: newmanmag.com
- ISSN: 1077-3959

New Man was a prominent American Christian lifestyle men's magazine, founded in 1994, and becoming an online publication in 2008. Its stated purpose is "Helping men to develop Christ-centered perspectives that will transform their lives, their families and their worlds.". For the first three years of its existence, it was the official magazine of the Promise Keepers movement.

== Print history ==
Stephen E. Strang, the publisher of Charisma magazine since 1975, was an early supporter of Promise Keepers, promoting it in the magazine. Charisma at the time had a circulation of approximately 100,000. In 1994, he made an agreement with Promise Keepers to publish New Man as the movement's official magazine, and began publishing the glossy bi-monthly 105 days later. By 1995, New Man circulation was reported at approximately 500,000 (though Strang remembers a height of 400,000 and eight issues per year). Members of the editorial advisory board included church leaders Jack W. Hayford and Wellington Boone. In April 1997, when New Man stopped being the official magazine of Promise Keepers, it had a circulation of 330,000.

New Man subscribers were mostly educated married men. 65% had a college degree, and their median income was $83,600 (40% higher than the U.S. male average income). Over 90% held a position in their church. Subscribers were distributed throughout the regions of the United States, and in Canada.

== Move online ==
In January 2008, Strang Communications stopped printing New Man, along with its sister publication, SpiritLed Woman, on paper, and made them online-only publications. At the time, New Man was printing 100,000 copies of six issues a year, with about 80,000 paid subscribers. Commenting on the move, Stephen Strang said, "the men’s movement isn’t what it used to be, and the Internet was hardly around when we started New Man. Now it’s the wave of the future." New Man is now published weekly on the Internet as an eMagazine.

July/August 2007 cover of New Man endorsing Mike Huckabee

== Huckabee endorsement ==
The July/August 2007 issue of New Man featured former Arkansas governor Mike Huckabee on its cover, and endorsed his 2008 run for president, as did an accompanying editorial in Strang's Charisma magazine. The New Man editorial called Huckabee "one of our own", and urged 1000 readers to each contribute $1000 to the then cash-strapped campaign. The American Prospect stated this was Huckabee's most prominent Christian right endorsement to this point, and connected it to Huckabee's strong second place showing in the Iowa Straw Poll. The New Man Huckabee endorsement was also credited for contributing to Huckabee's support by The New York Times and Huckabee himself. Film star Chuck Norris cited the New Man endorsement in his decision to endorse and work for Huckabee's campaign.
