= First Assembly of God =

First Assembly of God may refer to:

- Dream City Church (previously Phoenix First Assembly of God), an Assemblies of God megachurch in Phoenix, Arizona
- Van Buren First Assembly of God, an Assemblies of God church in Arkansas
