= Recreate =

Recreate or recreated may refer to:

- Warp20 (Recreated)
- Recreate 68
- Recreate for Growth
- Recreate Greece
- Recreate (youth event)
