= Battle Cry Campaign =

North American Christian organization

Battle Cry logo

The Battle Cry Campaign was an organizing initiative of a now-defunct Christian parachurch organization known as Teen Mania Ministries. This initiative, started in 2005 and headed by Teen Mania founder Ron Luce, had an evangelical Christian orientation; it primarily sought to influence American and Canadian social and political culture. Major backers included prominent evangelical leaders Joyce Meyer, Chuck Colson, Pat Robertson, Josh McDowell, and Jack Hayford.

== Purpose and goals ==
The basic purpose of the Battle Cry Campaign, as described in its promotional materials and events, was to ensure that Christianity survived in America by redefining society:

- "Christianity in America won't survive another decade... unless we do something now."
- "Our nation is at a crossroads. The path America is currently headed towards is a devestating [sic] future where Christianity may not survive."
- "You are invited... to join in an effort to redirect the way America is headed.

The urgency of this "Wake Up Call" was based on the assertion that then-current trends among teenagers would result in an inevitable decline in the number of "Bible-based believers:"

- "The evidence shows that if current evangelism trends prevail, only 4 percent of them [American teenagers] will stand firm for Jesus by the time they become the decision makers of our nation."

The fundamental goal of the campaign was the recruitment of 100,000 churches to implement a multifaceted campaign to promote youth commitment and involvement in church programs.

- "The goal is 100,000 churches fully engaged in reaching this generation by doubling and discipling their youth group each year for the next 5 years."

Other notable aspects of the Battle Cry Campaign involved other church and political leaders as "BattleCry Partners," the then-existing arena events and other programs offered by Teen Mania Ministries, the battlecry.com website, and a "legislative strategy engaging lawmakers to protect our teens."

== Major tenets ==
The Battle Cry Campaign maintained that "for the first time ever," "sexualized culture," "point and click pornography," and young people being "saturated with media influence" spelled doom for Christianity in America. It also cited gay marriage and other "culture war" issues as matters of current and future concern:

- "Our current society with 35% baby boomers as bible-based believers: increasingly perverted TV, film, music and video games, proliferation of Internet pornography, rise of activist government officials promoting gay marriage, attempts to remove the Ten Commandments from public buildings and attempts to remove God from the Pledge of Allegiance."
- "What does a nation with 4% evangelical Christians look like? Netherlands legalized euthanasia, Nudity in newspapers in England, Scotland's consenting age is 14 years old, Pastor arrested for preaching biblical perspective on homosexuality."

The campaign focused on corporations and media outlets for targeting young people with advertising and programming depicting content often labeled objectionable by evangelical leaders:

- "A stealthy enemy has infiltrated our country and is preying upon the hearts and minds of 33 million American teens. Corporations, media conglomerates and purveyors of popular culture have spent billions to seduce and enslave our youth."
- "This generation views 16 to 17 hours of television each week and sees on average 14,000 sexual scenes and references each year. That's more than 38 references every day."
- "This generation spends three hours a day online and is the first to grow up with point-and-click pornography. Almost 90 percent of teens have viewed pornography online at one of the 300,000 adult websites, most while doing homework."
- "More than 25 percent of teen-targeted radio segments contain sexual content; 42 percent of the top selling CDs contain sexual content"

When interviewed at a Battle Cry event in 2007, Ron Luce condemned "purveyors of popular culture" as "the enemy," who according to Luce are "terrorists, virtue terrorists, that are destroying our kids... they're raping virgin teenage America on the sidewalk, and everybody's walking by and acting like everything's OK. And it's just not OK." Battle Cry materials contain charges that a "sexualized culture" is the product of "media people" who are the "virtue terrorists" responsible for sexual content, naming examples such as "MTV, VH1, Desperate Housewives, and movies like Broken Back Mountain [sic]."

Other encouraged tenets included submission to certain kinds of authority:

- "We will respect the authorities placed in our lives, even though some may not live as honorably as they should."
- "We refuse to be led by those who are morally bankrupt."

Extending from Biblical analogies and characters used as role models, the campaign used narratives, metaphor and scripted staged presentations including images of weapons, pervasive use of a red pennant, and terms from a war lexicon such as God's Army, enemy and battle. It used current and former members of the U.S. armed forces prominently in the Battle Cry stadium events, encouraging young people to become "the warriors in this battle." In "Battle Cry for a Generation," a book released at the start of the campaign, Ron Luce wrote, "This is war. And Jesus invites us to get into the action, telling us that the violent — the 'forceful' ones — will lay hold of the kingdom." At a Cleveland Acquire the Fire event, he said, "The devil hates us, and we gotta be ready to fight and not be these passive little lukewarm, namby-pamby, kum-ba-yah, thumb-sucking babies that call themselves Christians. Jesus? He got mad! ... I want an attacking church!"

== Programs, activities and methods ==
Ron Luce speaking on the steps of San Francisco City Hall, surrounded by "Battle Cry" participants, March 24, 2006.

"Battle Cry" participants on the steps of San Francisco City Hall, March 24, 2006.

- Mass events in stadiums and arenas. Battle Cry stadium event locations in 2006 included San Francisco at AT&T Park, Detroit at Ford Field, and Philadelphia at Wachovia Spectrum arena. In 2007, the Battle Cry event returned to San Francisco in March, and to Detroit in April. A third event, originally scheduled for the M&T Bank Stadium in Baltimore, was held at the Nissan Pavilion in Bristow, Virginia, in May 2007. The 2008 events, titled BattleCry Recreate, were held in East Rutherford, New Jersey, Dallas, Texas, and Winston-Salem, North Carolina, in February and March.
- Pre-event rallies at places symbolic of governmental power. These smaller rallies in 2006, each with a few hundred participants, included San Francisco City Hall, Detroit City Hall, and Independence Visitor Center, in the area of historic sites associated with the American Revolution in Philadelphia. In following years, rallies were held again at San Francisco City Hall in March 2007 and in Times Square on February 8, 2008.
- Battle Cry Leadership Summits. Advertised as the "Wake Up Call," these meetings, featuring Ron Luce and a guest speaker, were scheduled for 44 cities in the United States and Canada through the fall of 2006. Scheduled guest speakers in that tour included Blaine Bartel (15 cities), Ted Haggard (10 cities), Tommy Barnett (7 cities), Jack Hayford, Jerry Falwell and Wellington Boone. Materials distributed at these meetings presented the Battle Cry Campaign plan, recruited churches and individuals to the campaign, and promoted other Teen Mania Ministries programs.
- Lobbying and gatherings intended to influence legislation and governmental policy. The initial legislative strategy of the Battle Cry Campaign was "to inform lawmakers of the plight of this generation and lobby them to pass legislation that protects our teens from the dangers they face while online and from advertising and other electronic media."
  - Operation Truth, a rally co-sponsored by Battle Cry and the Christian Action Alliance, was announced for August 6, 2006, at the California State Capitol. One of the announced objectives of this event was "to publicly let legislators know that Christians will not stand idly by while being bombarded with legislation that attacks the core values of believers." Examples of the legislation that motivated the organizers to protest, according to the flyer announcing the rally, included Senate Bill 1437 and Assembly Bill 606 of the 2005–2006 legislative session. These bills were intended to prohibit discrimination in California public schools on the basis of gender identity and sexual orientation, and to prohibit school activities and instructional content that reflects adversely on persons on the basis of their sexual orientation. Joel Johnson, who was then a frequent co-host of Teen Mania's Acquire the Fire arena events, had been announced as an Operation Truth speaker. (Similar bills were eventually signed into law by Governor Schwarzenegger in October 2007.)
  - Letter to presidential candidates. In a letter to U.S. presidential candidates released to the press on February 1, 2008, Ron Luce invited candidates to participate in or to address the pre-event rally in Times Square on February 8. The letter asked that candidates consider the priorities of "Teen Mania teens," that "they are looking to you to carry their priorities forward to Washington and the White House." Enclosed with the letter was a list of "Top 8 Teen Concerns in '08", which through the posing of eight leading questions, proposes governmental action against media content, abortion and sex education.
  - Rally in support of California Proposition 8. Ron Luce was one of the leaders of a youth rally, The Fine Line, held in support of California Proposition 8 on October 1, 2008, at Rock Church in San Diego. Proposition 8 is an initiative that would constitutionally prohibit same-sex marriage in California. Luce presented the "8 for 8" action plan at the conclusion of the event.
  - Message encouraging support of California Proposition 8. On October 30, 2008, Teen Mania distributed an e-mail message to supporters reminding readers of the Battle Cry rallies in San Francisco, "when a culture war was stirred up right there on the street in front of City Hall," casting those Battle Cry and similar events as the reason why "important issues are coming to the forefront and being decided right now." The featured battle "still being fought at the highest levels of California's government" centered on the definition of marriage contained in Proposition 8. The message included this quote from San Diego pastor Jim Garlow: "The definition of marriage is one of these 'tipping points.' No single social issue has threatened to forever muzzle Bible believing Christians like this contest. One person has astutely observed that 'we cannot win the culture war merely on Prop 8, but we can lose it on Prop 8.'" Readers were asked "to continue to get involved however possible to protect the Biblical view of marriage in America" and were directed to iprotectmarriage.com, a website that is part of the youth outreach of the "Yes on 8" campaign. The e-mail was signed by Kevin Benson, "Director of the BattleCry Campaign."
- Battle Cry 33 affiliated partner churches. As of December 2006, 1077 churches and ministries were listed on the battlecry.com website as partner churches of the Battle Cry Campaign. "33" refers to 33 million American teens.
- Marketing program. Battle Cry was marketed as a brand by Tocquigny, an advertising and marketing agency in Austin, Texas. "Tocquigny will help the organization re-launch its Battle Cry brand with the goal of spreading its message to 31 million teens across America." Teen Mania paid Tocquigny $451,397 for consulting services during the first full year of the Battle Cry Campaign.
- "Christian alternative to Myspace", battlecry.com ("Let MySpace be His space")

== Controversy and criticism ==
=== The "4 percent panic attack" ===
Some critics maintained that the statistics used by Teen Mania to support its cause were suspect and exaggerated. Rick Lawrence, who for the previous 18 years had edited Group Magazine, a publication for youth pastors, coined the label "4 percent panic attack" as the title of an editorial in his magazine in which he outright calls this statistic a "lie:"

This masquerading stat/lie goes something like this: "The percentage of young people who are Bible-believing Christians is steadily decreasing, and right now has dropped to a rock-bottom 4 percent." The 4 Percent Warning has entered unopposed into the church's vocabulary of accepted fact. But every time I hear it I cringe because it's so ridiculously over the top.

Lawrence went on to point out that the "4 percent" statistic originated in a 2003 report by Christian statistician George Barna, which is based on a very narrow definition of what defines an "evangelical" or "Bible-believing Christian." A Barna press release issued in December 2003 announced a study that "showed only 4% of adults have a biblical worldview as the basis of their decision-making." Lawrence took issue with Barna's attempt to measure the number of teens who apply "biblical principles" to "every decision" they make:

I teach an adult Sunday school class, and my guess is that half of the people in my class are still struggling to understand the Bible well enough to apply its wisdom to "every decision" they make. The point is that some of these "Bible-believing" standards are ridiculous when you consider how they're applied to kids.

Christian Smith, a professor of sociology at the University of Notre Dame and a specialist in the study of American evangelicals, said he was skeptical of the "4 percent" statistic and that that figure was inconsistent with research he had conducted and reviewed.

=== San Francisco demonstrations, city resolution and noise issue ===
Two weeks before the first Battle Cry stadium event in San Francisco, Teen Mania announced a pre-event rally to be held on the steps of City Hall on March 24, 2006. In the cover letter, signed by Ron Luce and sent to registered participants in the stadium event, the significance of City Hall as the location where gay marriages had been held two years before was explicitly pointed out:

Please prayerfully consider coming early and gathering for this pre-event Battlecry Rally at San Francisco’s City Hall and have your teens participate as we pray for the northwest region, our nation, and this generation (These are the very city hall steps where several months ago gay marriages were celebrated for the entire world to see).

City Hall is significant to many San Francisco residents for a different reason: it was where the city's first openly gay supervisor, Harvey Milk, and Mayor George Moscone, were assassinated in 1978. Ron Luce has said that, at the time of the rally, he was unaware of the historic and social relevance of the City Hall site.

Local activists organized a counter-demonstration of about 50 people to greet the Battle Cry participants. State Assemblyman Mark Leno, D-San Francisco, addressed the counter-demonstrators, saying that while such "fundamentalists" may be small in number, "they're loud, they're obnoxious, they're disgusting, and they should get out of San Francisco." Teen Mania later prominently quoted Leno as part of a postcard sent to San Francisco churches to promote the 2007 Battle Cry stadium event.

Earlier that week, the city's Board of Supervisors had passed a resolution "condemning upcoming rally to be held by anti-abortion groups in front of City Hall." The resolution called the rally an "act of provocation when a right-wing Christian fundamentalist group brings their anti-gay and anti-choice agenda of intolerance to the steps of San Francisco's City Hall" and that the presence of Battle Cry participants at City Hall "should be taken by no one as an official or semi-official sanctioning of their rally nor of their message by the elected officials of San Francisco."

This resolution was then cited by various commentators, including Fox News Channel's Bill O'Reilly and the city's leading newspaper, as evidence that the city itself was being intolerant of Christians or was attempting to silence the Battle Cry participants. Elizabeth Creely, a San Francisco activist with the Bay Area Coalition for Our Reproductive Rights, explained the purpose of the resolution this way:

...no one in city government made any attempt to silence anyone. The resolution was simply the progressive community's proverbial two cents thrown into a debate Battle Cry started when the group assembled on City Hall's steps.

Noise complaints from nearby residents received by the city due to the early Saturday morning start time became an issue during the preparations for the return of the Battle Cry event to AT&T Park in March 2007. According to the minutes of the city Entertainment Commission hearing regarding Teen Mania's application for a required loudspeaker permit, the director of event production for AT&T Park had advised Teen Mania in advance that noise had been an issue and "advised them to start any musical component after 10:00 A.M. due to complaints last year." The Commission approved the permit with the stipulation that amplified music not be used before 10:00 A.M. on Saturday. In a notice sent to Battle Cry participants, Teen Mania described this action as a "last minute noise ordinance" imposed by the city's Board of Supervisors, and while the notice began by saying "we want to respect and honor our lawmakers" it offered a sample letter to be sent to the Board that included the following:

The spiteful action of the Board [of Supervisors] is in reality a subtle jab at one of the core values of our nation... the action of the Board will be remembered as an ineffective act of intimidation one step removed from prohibiting our Constitutional right to free speech.

The event began Saturday morning as originally scheduled, without amplified music, through the use of radios throughout the crowd tuned to a broadcast of the event on a local Christian radio station.

=== Other criticism ===
The Hamilton, Ontario "Acquire the Fire" event in October 2006 prompted some commentary on Teen Mania's methods and message in the region's media. Toronto Star writer Jen Gerson began her account of the event this way:

They enter oblivious, hands outstretched, fat cheeks and watery eyes staring skyward to the Lord.

They are to leave warriors. Convinced by arguments crafted from statistics and fear, these children of God are told they are to be the salvation of a generation in decline, one beset by the perils of pop culture, advertising and corporate greed.

They absorb those lessons, squealing in delight whenever a speaker mentions the righteousness of Jesus.

Then they head to McDonald's.

In an interview with a CBC Television reporter, Bob Shantz, former University of Toronto chaplain, commented on the militarism inherent in Teen Mania's programs:

To feed them military language makes it into a campaign, makes life into an aggressive campaign where evil must be overcome by good... I don't think there's enough trust placed in teenagers to be discerning and let them find their own authority without having an authority thrust upon them.

In an interview with Bob Garfield on On the Media, Jeff Sharlet described a Battle Cry commercial in which replicated teens march off to war:

It is – and I use this word very advisedly – it is the aesthetic of fascism. Ron Luce isn't a fascist, but it is the aesthetic of fascism. And one of the strange things about Ron Luce is it's also the aesthetic of Stalinism, that these red flags that they wave - and you're not a member of this movement – you're a trench mate. It is designed to draw very stark lines and to dehumanize those who are on the other side.

Mark Cox, a pastor at Bethel Christian Church in the Mission District of San Francisco, told a San Francisco Chronicle reporter that he attended one "Acquire the Fire" event and would never return, commenting:

BattleCry has a lot of hype with not much substance to it... It [the Acquire the Fire event] left a bad taste in my mouth. My main concern is the effect it has on teenagers. They mistake adrenaline for the Holy Spirit... They're looking for an emotional high rather than a faith that will endure through hard times, not just on the mountaintop.
