= Cynthia McKinney 2008 presidential campaign =

Political campaign for United States presidency

McKinney 2008
- Campaign: U.S. presidential election, 2008
- Candidate: Cynthia McKinney; U.S. House of Representative from Georgia (1993–2003) (2005–2007); Rosa Clemente; Activist
- Affiliation: Green Party
- Status: Lost election November 4, 2008
- Key people: Rosa Clemente (Running mate)
- Slogan: Power to the people.

Website
- Cynthia McKinney 2008 (archived - October 22, 2008)

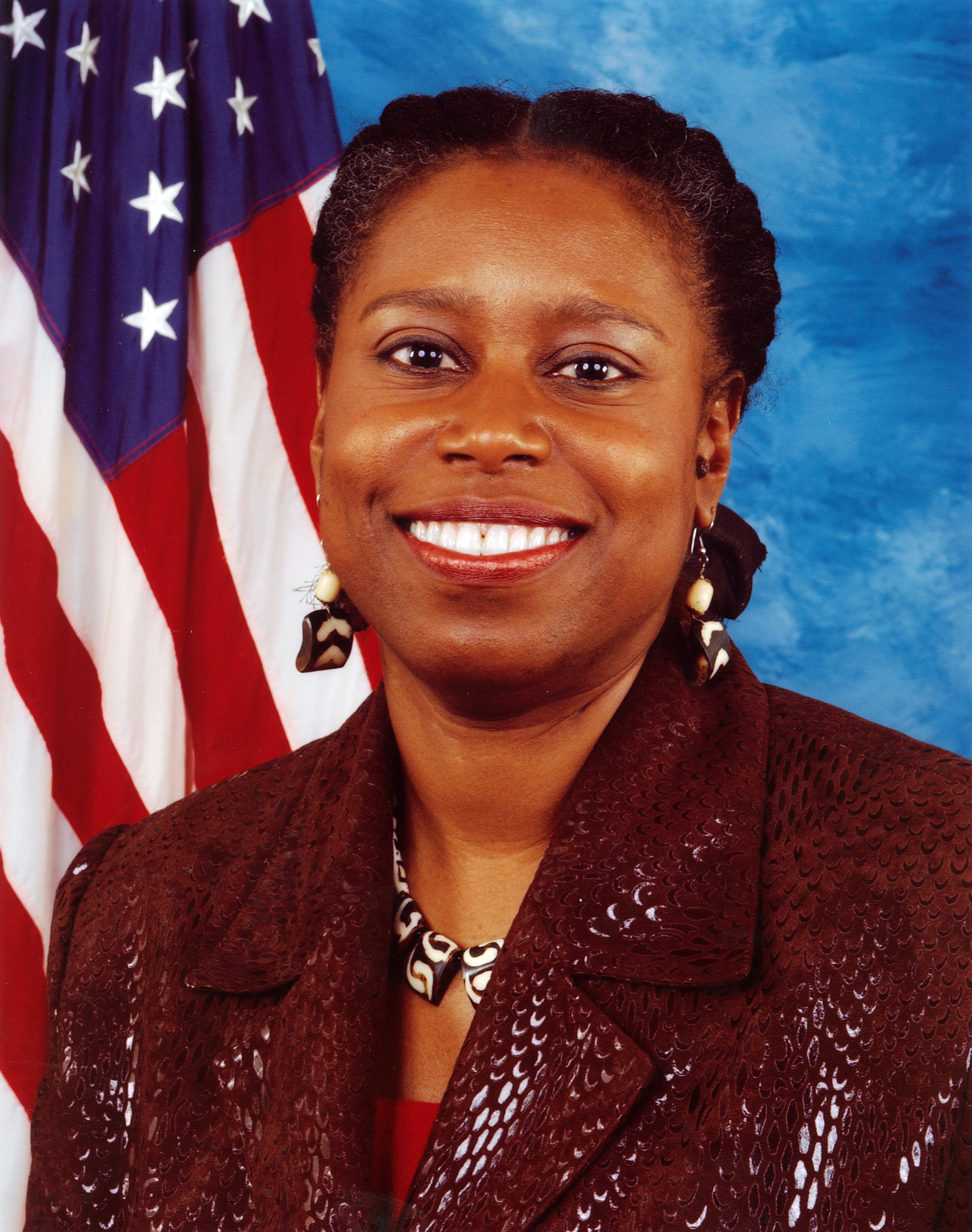
Presidential nominee Cynthia McKinney

The 2008 presidential campaign of Cynthia McKinney, member of the U.S. House of Representatives from Georgia's 11th district (1993–97) and 4th district (1997–2003, 2005–07), began on December 16, 2007, as a candidate for the Green Party presidential nomination via YouTube. She and her running mate Rosa Clemente accepted the Green Party's presidential nomination July 12, 2008 at the 2008 Green National Convention. Her campaign focused on issues such as racial profiling, September 11, 2001 attacks, and the Green Party's 10 key values. She also supported statehood for the District of Columbia, slavery reparations, electoral reforms including instant runoff voting, and calls for abolishing the death penalty and the war on drugs.

On November 4, 2008, McKinney finished sixth in the election with 161,603 votes, 41,744 more votes than the Cobb/LaMarche ticket four years prior.

== Early stages ==
On December 11, 2007, McKinney announced her candidacy for the Green Party nomination for President of the United States in the 2008 presidential election.

McKinney had little to do with the party apart from having had Green Party loyalists working on her congressional campaigns. This changed drastically following her defeat in the 2006 election. McKinney attended the California Green Party strategy retreat in Sonoma, California, where she was the keynote speaker. On May 25, 2007, she was asked about a presidential run on WBAI and confirmed that she had thought about a Green run: "2008 has not been ruled out, some kind of effort. Certainly now it is questionable as to whether that effort would come under the banner of the Democratic Party."

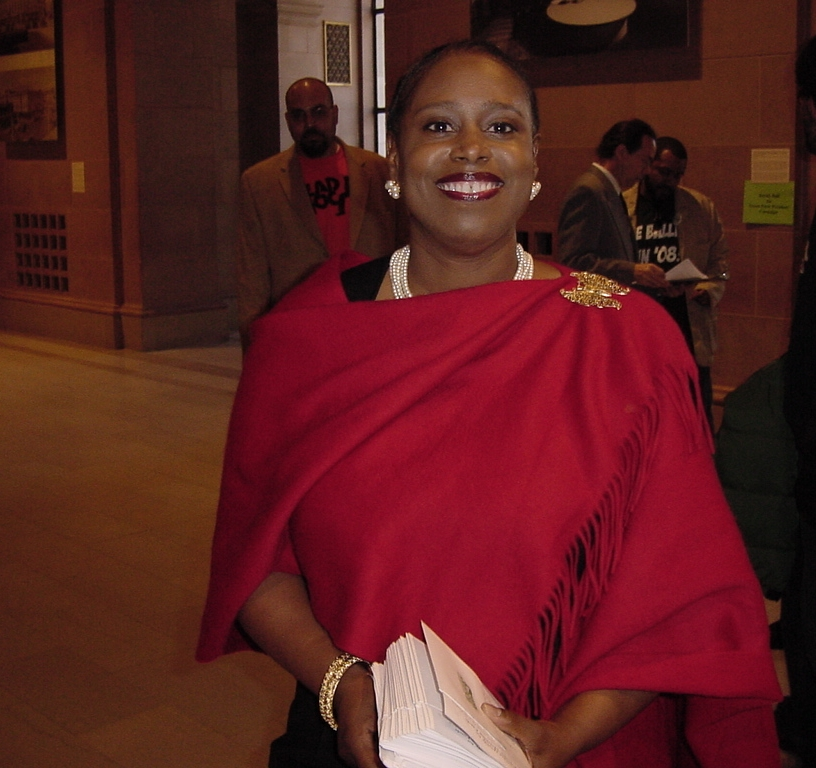
Cynthia McKinney before speaking at the Green Party Presidential Debate in San Francisco, January 2008

On June 9, speaking at a Harlem fundraiser for her Congressional campaign debt, McKinney addressed speculation that she might run for president in 2008. At the end of the program, Robert Knight of Pacifica Radio, who emceed the evening's events, took the pulpit to ask: "I can't hardly wait for 2008. Ms. McKinney, in 2008, what color is your parachute?" McKinney responds from the audience, "it's not red and it's not blue." McKinney also appeared at the July 15 Green Party National Meeting in Reading, Pennsylvania, where she suggested that the Green Party could become a progressive political force. "[T]he disgust of the American people with what they see before them — all they need is the blueprint and a road map. Why not have the Green Party provide the blueprint and the road map?"

On July 17, McKinney also received the endorsement of the Workers World Party, the first time that party chose not to nominate a candidate of its own.

At an August 27 peace rally in Kennebunkport, Maine, McKinney confirmed the depth of her disenchantment with the Democratic Party, urging San Francisco voters to replace Nancy Pelosi with antiwar activist Cindy Sheehan. On September 10, in a letter to the Steering Committee of the Green Party of the United States, McKinney stated she would not seek the Green Party nomination for president. However, in early October it appeared that McKinney was making moves toward declaring herself an official Green Party candidate.

By October 9, 2007, Green leaders were receiving emails indicating McKinney had formally joined the Green Party. The emails also indicate McKinney could announce a Green Party presidential bid by the third week of October. Following a brief exploratory visit to California in mid-October, McKinney filed with the FEC. She formally announced her candidacy with a video on her website and on YouTube on December 16, 2007. Later that month she agreed to join with others on the Green Party California Primary Ballot for an event in San Francisco entitled Campaign 2008: A Presidential Debate That Matters. McKinney has also filed with the State Board of Elections of Illinois for the Green party in the presidential race.

On July 9, 2008, she named her running mate as Rosa Clemente and clinched the party's nomination three days later at the 2008 Green Party National Convention.

== Green Party Nominee ==
=== Democratic National Convention ===
During the Democratic National Convention from August 25–28, Cynthia McKinney and Rosa Clemente appeared at several events and demonstrations in Denver. On August 24, McKinney appeared at the End the Occupations March and Rally organized by Recreate 68, and spoke to the crowd from the West Steps of the Colorado State Capitol Building. McKinney's appearance at the event caused some controversy after the Green Party of Colorado's decision not to support Recreate 68. On the 27th, Rosa Clemente spoke at an "Open The Debates" rally organized by the Nader/Gonzalez campaign.

During the first week in September, McKinney traveled to Wisconsin for several events. On the 5th, McKinney spoke in Racine, Wisconsin to the local We Are Change group. On September 6, McKinney spoke in Baraboo, Wisconsin at Fighting Bob Fest, the largest annual political festival in the United States, named in honor of former Senator Bob La Follette.

=== 2008 Hurricane Katrina conspiracy theory ===
Cynthia McKinney was reported by Fox News on October 2, 2008, to have had a conspiracy theory stating that during the aftermath Hurricane Katrina, The Pentagon dumped 5,000 executed felons that were killed by a single bullet to the head. McKinney stated that she was informed by the mother of a National Guard, with verifications from "insiders."

=== Third party debate ===
McKinney accepted an invitation to attend the third-party presidential debate.

=== Result ===
On Election Day, the McKinney/Clemente ticket received 161,797 votes (0.12% of the popular vote), garnering 41,938 more votes than the Cobb/LaMarche ticket four years prior, though once again the Green Party candidate finished in 6th place, finishing 37,953 votes behind Chuck Baldwin of the Constitution Party, a bigger margin than in 2004. Nationally, McKinney received her highest percentage of the vote in Humboldt County, California, where she received 1.01% of the vote. Humboldt had also been Cobb's highest-percentage county in 2004, and it would be Green nominee Jill Stein's highest-percentage county in 2012.

== Ballot status ==
The Green Party had announced plans to get on all 50 state ballots and D.C. for 2008. They did not meet their goal. McKinney was on 32 ballots with 368 electoral votes (68.4% of the total possible) as well as another 17 states as a write-in candidate.
The following is a table comparison of ballot status in 2008 to 2004.

	Electoral Votes	2008	2004
States	51	32 (49)	25 (43)
Electoral Votes	538	368 (528)	267 (479)
Percent of EVs	100%	68.4% (98.1%)	49.6% (89.0%)
Alabama	9	(write-in)	(write-in)
Alaska	3	(write-in)	On ballot
Arizona	10	On ballot	(write-in)
Arkansas	6	On ballot	On ballot
California	55	On ballot	On ballot
Colorado	9	On ballot	On ballot
Connecticut	7	(write-in)	On ballot
Delaware	3	On ballot	On ballot
Florida	27	On ballot	On ballot
Georgia	15	(write-in)	(write-in)
Hawaii	4	On ballot	On ballot
Idaho	4	(write-in)	(write-in)
Illinois	21	On ballot	(write-in)
Indiana	11	(write-in)	
Iowa	7	On ballot	On ballot
Kansas	6	(write-in)	(write-in)
Kentucky	8	(write-in)	
Louisiana	9	On ballot	On ballot
Maine	4	On ballot	On ballot
Maryland	10	On ballot	On ballot
Massachusetts	12	On ballot	
Michigan	17	On ballot	On ballot
Minnesota	10	On ballot	On ballot
Mississippi	6	On ballot	On ballot
Missouri	11	(write-in)	
Montana	3	(write-in)	On ballot
Nebraska	5	On ballot	On ballot
Nevada	5	On ballot	On ballot
New Hampshire	4	(write-in)	(write-in)
New Jersey	15	On ballot	On ballot
New Mexico	5	On ballot	On ballot
New York	31	On ballot	(write-in)
North Carolina	15	(write-in)	(write-in)
North Dakota	3	(write-in)	
Ohio	20	On ballot	(write-in)
Oklahoma	7		
Oregon	7	On ballot	On ballot
Pennsylvania	21	(write-in)	On ballot
Rhode Island	4	On ballot	On ballot
South Carolina	8	On ballot	On ballot
South Dakota	3		
Tennessee	11	On ballot	(write-in)
Texas	34	(write-in)	(write-in)
Utah	5	On ballot	(write-in)
Vermont	3	(write-in)	(write-in)
Virginia	13	On ballot	(write-in)
Washington	11	On ballot	On ballot
West Virginia	5	On ballot	(write-in)
Wisconsin	10	On ballot	On ballot
Wyoming	3	(write-in)	(write-in)
District of Columbia	3	On ballot	(write-in)

== Endorsements ==
- Mumia Abu-Jamal journalist and activist;
- Jared Ball, withdrawn candidate for 2008 Green presidential nomination;
- Roseanne Barr, actress and comedian;
- Noam Chomsky
- Glen Ford, editor of Black Agenda Report journal;
- Professor Griff of hip-hop group Public Enemy;
- M1 from hip-hop group Dead Prez;
- Ron Paul, candidate for 2008 Republican presidential nomination, and ten-term United States Congressman (Also endorsed Chuck Baldwin, Bob Barr and Ralph Nader);
- Cindy Sheehan, Gold star Mother and peace activist;
- Kat Swift, candidate for 2008 Green presidential nomination;
- Rich Whitney, 2006 Illinois Green gubernatorial candidate;
- Workers' International League
- Workers World Party.
- Daniel Sunjata, Tony Award-nominated actor.
- Chuck Turner, member of the Boston City Council

== See also ==
- Comparison of United States presidential candidates, 2008
- List of candidates in the United States presidential election, 2008
- Third party (United States) presidential candidates, 2008
