= Ron Luce =

Co-founder of the now defunct Teen Mania Ministries

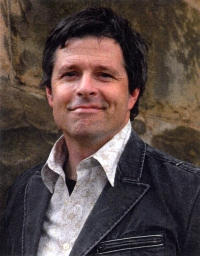
- Born: July 11, 1961 (age 65); Contra Costa County, California, U.S.
- Occupations: Former Evangelist, author
- Spouse(s): Katie (Kathryn Anne) Luce (May 19, 1984 – present)
- Children: Hannah (September 21, 1989 – present); Charity (October 17, 1990 – present); Cameron (January 18, 1992 – present)

Ronald Allan Luce (born July 11, 1961) is an American evangelical who cofounded and served as president of Teen Mania Ministries, which was located in Garden Valley, Texas. Together with his wife Katie, Ron founded Teen Mania in 1986 and led the organization until its bankruptcy in 2015. Luce is now CEO of a new ministry called Generation Next.

== Early life and education ==
Luce became involved in drug and alcohol abuse while living with his father. Luce was taken in by a pastor, under whose roof he became a Christian. He then committed his life to evangelizing and training young people. He received his bachelor's degree in Psychology and Theology from Oral Roberts University and his Masters in Counseling Psychology from the University of Tulsa.

== Career ==
One of Ron's early involvements was with Willie George Ministries, where he was involved in the Fire By Nite Christian variety show that was distributed to subscribers, and syndicated on television.

Luce also hosted weekend Acquire the Fire youth rallies and ministry clinics in large venues nationwide, many attracting tens of thousands of teens and youth workers. He also hosted a weekly TV show, Acquire the Fire, telecast on the Trinity Broadcasting Network and other Christian television stations. Training and ministry experience was provided for young adults wishing to enter into youth (and other) ministries, as interns in the Honor Academy. Luce expanded his operations in 2005 by starting the Battle Cry Campaign.

In 2002, U.S. President George W. Bush appointed him to the White House Advisory Commission on Drug-Free Communities, on which he served until 2004. Luce joined the board of trustees of Oral Roberts University in January 2008.

Teen Mania filed for Chapter 7 bankruptcy in December 2015, following financial difficulties, a lawsuit filed by Compassion International, and criticism from former interns and employees. Prior to filing bankruptcy, individuals who purchased tickets to canceled Teen Mania events were not refunded. Teen Mania was among the country's fifth-most insolvent charity with a net worth of -$5.2 million.

== Criticism ==
=== Militant Statements ===
Ron Luce speaks of a battle that is waged against the "powers of darkness" and also implemented through the "Love of Jesus Christ" to the individual. Some of his statements: "This is war. And Jesus invites us to get into the action, telling us that the violent—the ‘forceful' ones—will lay hold of the kingdom." At a Cleveland "Acquire the Fire" event, he said, "The devil hates us, and we gotta be ready to fight and not be these passive little lukewarm, namby-pamby, kum-ba-yah, thumb-sucking babies that call themselves Christians. Jesus? He got mad! ... I want an attacking church!" Luce further exhorts his young followers to proclaim in unison: "I will keep my eyes on the battle, submitting to Your code, even when I don't understand."

In a profile in Ministry Today magazine in 2014, Luce confirmed, "We're doing everything we can to raise up a young army who will change the world for Christ."

=== Popular culture the enemy ===
Luce has also publicly condemned "purveyors of popular culture" as "the enemy," who according to Luce are "terrorists, virtue terrorists, that are destroying our kids... they're raping virgin teenage America on the sidewalk, and everybody's walking by and acting like everything's OK. And it's just not OK."

=== Proposition 8 ===
Ron Luce was one of the leaders of a youth rally, "The Fine Line," held in support of California Proposition 8 on October 1, 2008 at Rock Church in San Diego. Proposition 8 was an initiative that would constitutionally prohibit same-sex marriage in California. Luce presented the "8 for 8" action plan at the conclusion of the event.

=== MSNBC Documentary ===
In 2011, Ron Luce was interviewed for an MSNBC documentary entitled "Mind Over Mania." The documentary showed footage of controversial Teen Mania events, doctrines, and practices, and also included interviews with past Honor Academy interns and Christian mental health professionals who criticized the ministry for using what they identified as cult mind control techniques according to Robert Jay Lifton's "Eight Criteria for Thought Reform". Luce declined a follow-up interview for the documentary, but later said that the footage was taken out of context and the MSNBC filmmakers had approached him under false pretenses. However, MSNBC responded in a statement that Luce's accusations were false. The documentary won an investigative reporting award from the CINE organization.

=== Lawsuit ===
On September 9, 2015, the 4th Judicial District Court in Colorado Springs issued an arrest warrant for Ron Luce for failure to appear at a hearing regarding a breach of contract lawsuit against Teen Mania. In the lawsuit, Compassion International sought a $174,124.73 judgment; Compassion's position was that they paid for stage time at Teen Mania events to make appeals for attendees to sponsor children in need; those events were canceled and the funds were not returned.

== Published works ==
Luce has written or co-written a number of books:

- Battlecry for a Generation
- Battlecry for My Generation
- Guard Your Heart
- It's Only a Tattoo
- "The Mark of a World Changer"
- Power of One
- When Teens Pray
- Re-Create: Building a culture in your home stronger than the culture destroying your kids

Other works by Luce include the "Over the Edge" devotional series, and the "Rise Up," "Dig In," "Band Together," "Move Out," and "Double Vision" curricula associated with the Battle Cry Campaign.

== See also ==
- Teen Mania Ministries
- Battle Cry Campaign
- Shiny Happy People
