= Hannah Luce =

American plane crash survivor and daughter of Ron Luce

Hannah Luce (born September 21, 1989) is the daughter of Teen Mania Ministries cofounder and preacher Ron Luce. She is the founder of Mirror Tree, a non-profit devoted to re-integrating refugees from the horrors of rape, genocide, civil wars and other means of trauma by funding educational research to improve their lives. Hannah lives in Chicago, Illinois.

== Plane crash ==
Luce was one of the five passengers heading to a Christian youth rally held by Teen Mania Ministries called Acquire the Fire, in Council Bluffs, Iowa. They were on board an eight-seater Cessna 401 aircraft which went down about an hour and a half after takeoff on Friday, May 11, 2012, 9 miles (14 km) west of Chanute, Kansas. The plane was flying from Richard Lloyd Jones Jr. Airport in Jenks, Oklahoma, to Council Bluffs Municipal Airport in Iowa. The plane burst into flames when it crashed, killing the pilot, Luke Sheets, of Ephraim, Wisconsin; Stephen Luth, of Muscatine, Iowa; and Garrett Coble, of Tulsa, Oklahoma. U.S. Marine Corps veteran Austin Anderson, of Ringwood, Oklahoma, died on May 12, 2012, from burns to over 90 percent of his body. Though she didn't suffer any broken bones or internal bleeding, Luce was burned over 30 percent of her body, and she was treated in the burn center of the Kansas University Medical Center in Kansas.

== Dramatization ==
The PBS series Nova featured the crash in season 2, episode 2, of the TV show Why Planes Crash, in an episode called "Brush With Death".

== Works ==
Luce wrote Fields of Grace: Faith, Friendship, and the Day I Nearly Lost Everything (2013) with The New York Times bestselling author Robin Gaby Fisher.
