= Matthew Barnett =

American pastor

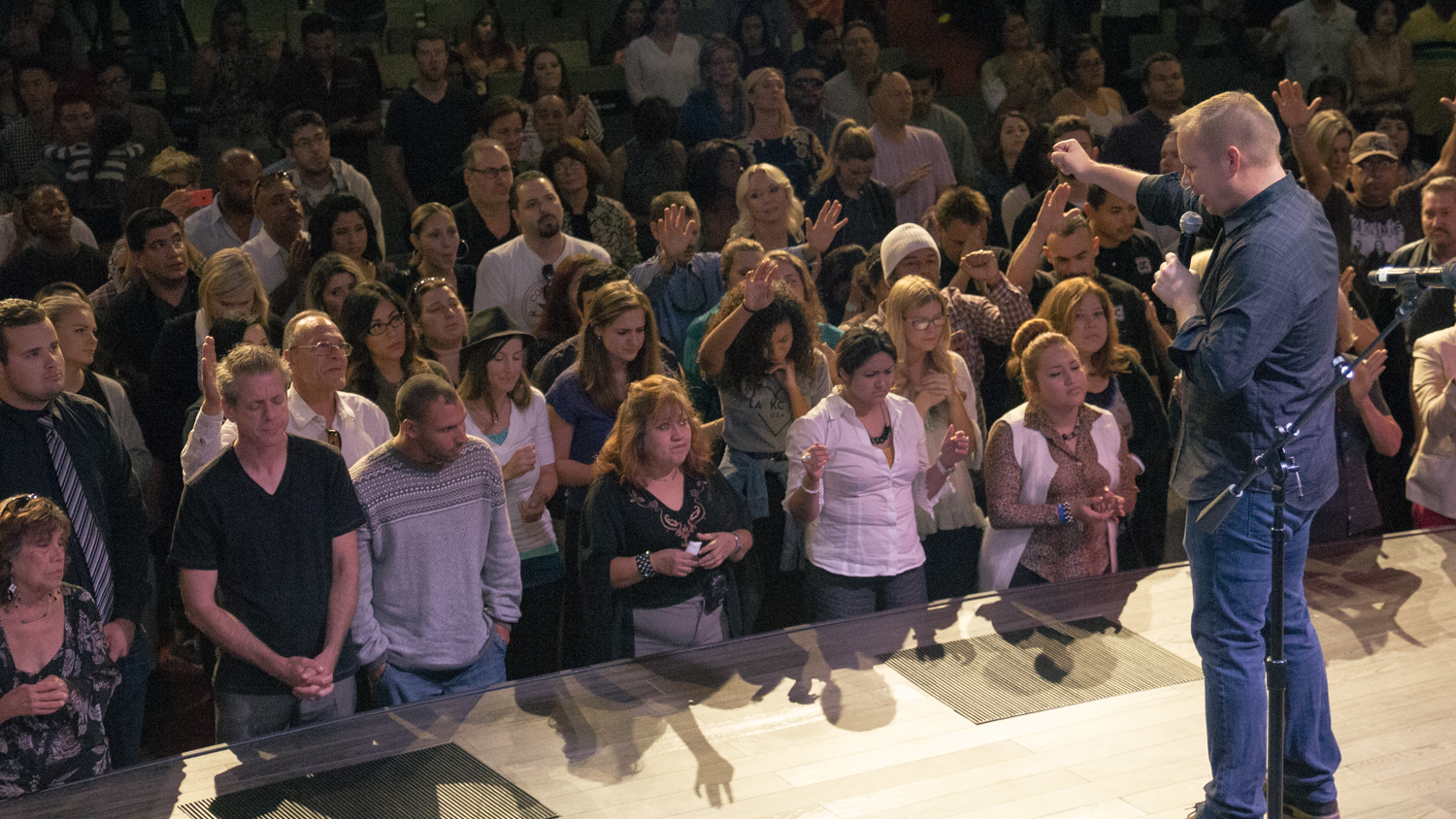
- Barnett preaching at a Dream Center service in the Angelus Temple (June 2010)
- Occupation: Pastor

Matthew Barnett is co-founder of the Dream Center and was the senior pastor of the Angelus Temple, the central house of worship of the International Church of the Foursquare Gospel in the Echo Park district of Los Angeles, California.

== Dream Center ==
Matthew's father, Tommy Barnett, is pastor of the Dream City Church megachurch in Phoenix, Arizona. In September 1994 his church purchased the Queen of Angels Hospital, a Los Angeles landmark in the Echo Park neighborhood of Los Angeles. The building was converted for use as a soup kitchen, a group home for runaways, prostitutes and gang members, and a shelter for the homeless. It also provided job training and religious services. By 1997 Matthew, then 23, was managing the day-to-day operations of what was to be called The Dream Center. The Dream Center now reaches over 35,000 people each week in 273 ministries and outreaches. The center is open 24/7. An important role is rehabilitating drug addicts, who account for about half its residents, including underage teens.

== Angelus Temple ==
In November 2001 the Angelus Temple, founded in 1923 by Aimee Semple McPherson, merged with The Dream Center and Matthew Barnett became senior pastor of both churches. At the time of the merger, Angelus Temple was a long way from its glory days as one of the largest churches in the nation. Its main sanctuary had not been used on a regular basis in several years. A 1,000-member Hispanic congregation met in a nearby auditorium, while its main congregation had been reduced to only 25 elderly people. At the same time, the Dream Center was holding services in a packed gym. Through an agreement between the Assemblies of God and the International Church of the Foursquare Gospel, Barnett took over as pastor of Angelus Temple, while retaining his Assemblies of God ordination. The temple's sanctuary was renovated at a cost of $7 million and is now used for Dream Center services.

Barnett received the Religious Heritage Award in 1999. U.S. President George W. Bush endorsed his ministry and expressed high regard for his achievements.

== Personal life ==
Matthew Barnett ran seven marathons in seven continents in seven days because a donor donated $100,000 to help homeless veterans, human trafficking victims, drug addicts, battered women and other humanitarian causes at the Dream Center if Barnett would do the marathon challenge. Barnett, who survived a pulmonary embolism prior to that and was told by doctors he would never run a marathon, ran several marathons to raise awareness and funds for the Dream Center.

== Bibliography ==
- Matthew Barnett (2000). The Church That Never Sleeps. Thomas Nelson. ISBN 0-7852-6859-6.
- Matthew Barnett (2011). The Cause Within You. BarnaBooks. ISBN 978-1-4143-4846-9.
