= Tocquigny =

- Industry: Advertising
- Founded: 1980
- Headquarters: Austin, Texas
- Key people: Yvonne Tocquigny, Tom Fornoff
- Website: www.ytbranding.com

Tocquigny (est. 1980) is an advertising and marketing consultancy in the United States. The full-service agency was sold in June 2015 and now operates as the Yvonne Tocquigny Branding Group.

== History ==
Founded in 1980 as a design studio by Yvonne Tocquigny, the business grew into a full-service ad agency recognized primarily for its business-to-business and digital work. Dell was one of the first blue chip companies to work with Tocquigny, starting in the early 1990s. In 2015 the full-service Tocquigny agency was acquired by Memphis-based Archer Malmo. In 2016 Tocquigny was reimagined as the virtual agency Yvonne Tocquigny Branding Group.

== Clients ==
Past and present client roster includes:

- Accruent
- Applied Materials
- Caterpillar Inc.
- Dell
- Ergon, Inc.
- G2-Ops, Inc.
- InfoSnap
- Jeep
- LegacyTexas Bank
- NFP Advisor Services Group
- Qualico
- Regent University
- Teradata
- Tory Burch
- World Vision International
- World's Finest Chocolate

== SXSW Involvement ==
At SXSW 2014 and 2015, Tocquigny hosted the "Tocquigny Taco Tour". Wrapping a bus and mounting a giant taco on the front, Tocquigny shuttled SXSW attendees from downtown Austin to various local taco shops during the festival. The design work for the Taco Tour was awarded a HOW Magazine 2014 Promotion & Marketing Design Award and a 2014 Print Regional Design Annual Award.
