= Prosperity Bancshares =

American bank

Prosperity Bancshares, Inc.
- Type: Public
- Traded as: NYSE: PB; S&P 400 component
- Industry: Banking
- Founded: 1983; 43 years ago in Houston, Texas
- Headquarters: Houston, Texas, U.S.
- Key people: David Zalman, Chairman & CEO; Asylbek Osmonov, CFO
- Net income: ▲$526.9 million (2023)
- Total assets: ▲$37.8 billion (2023)
- Total equity: ▲$7.08 billion (2023)
- Number of employees: 3,850 (2023)
- Website: www.prosperitybankusa.com

Prosperity Bancshares, Inc. is a bank holding company headquartered in Houston, Texas with operations in Texas and central Oklahoma. As of December 31, 2019, the company operated 285 branches: 65 in the Houston area, including The Woodlands, Texas; 30 in South Texas, including Corpus Christi, Texas and Victoria, Texas; 75 in the Dallas–Fort Worth metroplex; 22 in East Texas; 29 in Central Texas, including Austin, Texas and San Antonio; 34 in West Texas, including Lubbock, Texas, Midland–Odessa, and Abilene, Texas; 16 in Bryan–College Station; 6 in Central Oklahoma; and 8 in Tulsa, Oklahoma.

== History ==
The company was formed in 1983 to purchase a former Allied Bank branch in Edna, Texas. The Edna bank dated back to 1949 as the First National Bank of Edna.

In November 2008, in a transaction organized by the Federal Deposit Insurance Corporation, the company acquired Franklin Bank, which suffered from bank failure.

In 2010, the company acquired three branches in Texas as part of the acquisition of FBOP Corporation by U.S. Bancorp.

In July 2012, the company acquired the 37-branch American State Bank, which provided the company its first locations in West Texas.

In April 2013, the company acquired Coppermark Bank and its nine branches, including six branches in Central Oklahoma, its first presence outside Texas.

In November 2013, the company acquired First Victoria National Bank and its 34 branches.

In April 2014, the company acquired F&M Bancorporation and its 13 branches, including several in Tulsa, Oklahoma.

In November 2019, the company acquired LegacyTexas Bank and its 42 branches.

In April 2024, the merger of Prosperity Bancshares and Lone Star State Bancshares and subsidiaries of LS Bancshares and Prosperity Bank was completed. The end of the operational integration is 28 October 2024.

In January 2026, the company acquired American Bank Holding Corporation and its subsidiary American Bank which operated 18 banking offices and two loan production offices in South and Central Texas.

In February 2026, the company acquired Southwest Bancshares, Inc and its wholly owned subsidiary Texas Partners Bank which operated 11 banking offices in Central Texas including its main office in San Antonio.

In July 2026, the company acquired Stellar Bancorp, Inc. Stellar operated 52 banking offices including its main office in Houston and banking offices in the Houston, Beaumont and East Texas areas and in Dallas, Texas.
