= Stephen Strang =

American evangelical publisher

Stephen E. Strang (born 1951) is an American evangelical publisher. He is the founder and chief executive officer of Charisma Media. In 2005 he was named by Time Magazine as one of the “25 Most Influential Evangelicals in America”.

== Career ==
Strang started his career as a reporter for The Sentinel Star, a Florida newspaper.

=== Charisma Media ===
Strang founded Charisma magazine in 1975 through his church, Calvary Assembly of God, in Orlando, Florida. He bought out the magazine in 1981. He targeted the magazine to charismatic Christians. By the year 2000, the magazine employed 200 people and had a revenue of $US 30 million.

=== Political activity ===
Strang has supported George W. Bush for US president and was invited to the Bush White House. Strang supported Mike Huckabee for US president in 2008.

Strang has been a supporter of Donald Trump, asserting that divine prophecy foretold his election in 2016. He also felt that divine prophecy foretold the reelection of Donald Trump in 2020, and did not concede that Joe Biden won the election until after Congress certified the election on January 6, 2021.

As of February 2023, Strang was a supporter of Ron DeSantis for the Republican nomination for president.

==== Criticism ====
Strang has been criticized by Right Wing Watch because he has "cast political battles as holy wars". His book entitled "God, Trump, and COVID-19" was described as having prompted "questions regarding the spiritual nourishment of some American evangelicals" due to its overriding preoccupation with Donald Trump and its comparative neglect of the Bible or the gospel message.

== Personal life ==
Strang has a wife named Joy and two sons, Chandler and Cameron.

== Bibliography ==
Strang has written numerous books including:

- The Faith of George W. Bush
- God, Donald Trump and the 2020 Election
- God and Cancel Culture

== See also ==
- Kenneth Copeland
- New Man (Christian magazine)
