= Teen Mania Ministries =

Christian organization in Texas, US

Coordinates: 32°31′48″N 95°32′49″W

Teen Mania International
- Formation: 1986
- Dissolved: 2015
- Type: Christian missions
- Headquarters: Dallas, Texas
- Location: Dallas, Texas
- President/Founder: Ron Luce
- Staff: 3 on Board of Directors
- Website: teenmania.com

Teen Mania International was an evangelical Christian youth organization located in Dallas, Texas (formerly Garden Valley, Texas). Teen Mania focused primarily on four key programs, with a few additional smaller endeavors. It was one of the largest Christian youth organizations in the U.S.

Its primary program included "Acquire the Fire" events, described by one writer as "a mix of pep rally, rock concert and church service," that were held in over 30 cities across the United States and Canada each year. The ministry focused much of its energy towards its domestic and overseas mission trips, operated under the title "Global Expeditions". Teen Mania operated a one-year-long residential leadership training program on its campus—the Honor Academy—aimed towards high school graduates, and college students.

The ministry faced criticism for its use of overtly militaristic symbolism, as well as techniques that have been compared as similar to military training. This aggressive element is reflected in the vision statement: "To build an engaged ensemble of young people that are: radical, passionate, resilient, informed revolutionaries that will take the Gospel to the nations and multiply by teaching others to do the same." Teen Mania has also been criticized by some former interns and employees for what they characterize as spiritual abuse and financial mismanagement. In its final years it faced significant financial difficulties, including a foreclosure on the campus, a lawsuit for breach of contract, and over $5.2 million in negative assets.

In February 2014 the ministry changed its name to "Teen Mania International" as part of a move from Garden Valley to Dallas after defaulting on the mortgage on their campus. In May 2014, Teen Mania announced that it would be expanding its work to include overseas churches.

In December 2015, founder Ron Luce announced via Christianity Today that they "would cease operations", effectively shutting down all of its operations. Teen Mania filed for Chapter 7 Bankruptcy on December 17, 2015, closing the ministry permanently.

== Denomination ==
Teen Mania was not affiliated with a specific denomination; the organization worked with local churches of various denominations as a para-church organization, while providing its programs and other resources for youth, parents and church leaders.

== Founder ==
Ron Luce was the president and founder of Teen Mania Ministries. He and his wife Katie founded Teen Mania in Tulsa, Oklahoma, in 1986. Luce has publicly condemned "purveyors of popular culture" as "the enemy," who according to Luce are "terrorists, virtue terrorists, that are destroying our kids... they're raping virgin teenage America on the sidewalk, and everybody's walking by and acting like everything's OK. And it's just not OK."

Ron and Katie Luce claimed they did not receive royalties for any product that was sold through the ministry or used for fundraising or other promotional purposes by Teen Mania.

== Primary ministries ==
There were six primary ministries within the organization that served to facilitate its mission.

=== Acquire the Fire ===
Acquire the Fire ("ATF") was a yearly youth conference that was presented in over 30 major cities in the United States and Canada. These conferences consisted of Christian teachings, full-length stage dramas, worship via song, and live concerts. ATF / Battle Cry producers adopted a militaristic tone, with frequent use of words such as battle, enemy, soldier, foes and warfare, accompanied by the display of military imagery and, at one such event, the use of simulated weapons. These events were mentioned by Ministry Today magazine as one example of the "crusade model" of evangelism. Youth Today also noted the event's focus on cultural and spiritual warfare. In an interview in 2014, Ron Luce stated, "We're doing everything we can to raise up a young army who will change the world for Christ."

In 2014 and 2015, Acquire the Fire cancelled many events due to financial difficulties attributed to ATF youth music leader and treasurer Jonathan Bimp, leading to criticism from many church leaders who said they did not receive refunds of the money they had paid.

=== Global Expeditions ===
Global Expeditions was a short-term missionary ministry. Young people were sent on missions projects of between one and eight weeks in the United States and overseas. Global Expeditions claimed to have sent 67,783 missionaries to 69 countries with 1,324,637 people converting to Christianity.

=== Honor Academy ===
The Honor Academy was an internship program for high school graduates and college students. Honor Academy interns performed most of the day-to-day functions of the different ministry programs through ministry placements. Teen Mania reports there are over 5,000 graduates of the Honor Academy. In order to participate in the Honor Academy, individuals were required to raise their own financial support, which ranged from $650 to $850 per month depending on the specific program. These funds were a tax-deductible contribution directly to the ministry and were non-refundable.

During the mid-2000s, the Honor Academy had nearly 1,000 participants per year, resulting in seven-figure profits for Teen Mania. However, enrollment numbers declined to fewer than 100 as of 2014. In 2014, following the foreclosure on the Garden Valley campus, Ron Luce announced that the program would be rebranded in Dallas as the Acquire the Fire Leadership Institute. It was later announced in July 2014 that the new internship would be suspended for the 2014–2015 academic year, with second-year interns participating in a scaled-down road tour called Go Teams. Teen Mania said that prospective students in the cancelled program would be refunded on their payments toward the $8,400 tuition, although some parents complained of the short notice. The proposed new program never took place as Teen Mania filed for bankruptcy in 2015.

=== Extreme Camps ===
Extreme Camps was an annual series of summer camps that was held at the campus in Garden Valley, Texas. Activities included paint ball, ropes courses, swimming, and extreme sports with presentations from Christian speakers and musicians.

=== School of Worship ===
The School of Worship was a second-year program for Honor Academy graduates focusing on technical skills and spiritual leadership for musicians.

=== Battle Cry Campaign ===
The Battle Cry Campaign which ended in 2007, was an organizing initiative of Teen Mania Ministries, started in 2005 and headed by Teen Mania founder Ron Luce; it primarily sought to influence American and Canadian social and political culture. Major backers include prominent evangelical leaders Joyce Meyer, Chuck Colson, Pat Robertson, Josh McDowell, and Jack Hayford.

== The campus ==
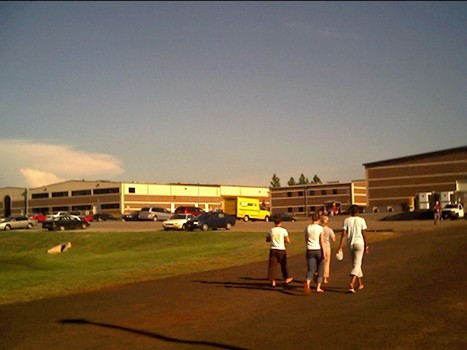
Teen Mania headquarters in Garden Valley, Texas, during the summer of 2005

In 1996 Teen Mania relocated from Tulsa, Oklahoma to Garden Valley, Texas, purchasing the property that was formerly the location of Keith Green's Last Days Ministries. Garden Valley is now home to five other major Christian ministries.

In February 2014, Ron Luce announced that the Garden Valley property had been released to its mortgage holder and the ministry headquarters were to be moved to Dallas, saying, "the reality of land management is no longer practical or germane to the international scope of the organization." Teen Mania's Communications Director later told reporters that the Honor Academy had in fact stopped their mortgage payments in November 2013 leading to default and foreclosure, but that Luce hid "the full nature of the situation" to raise donations. Luce has denied these reports, saying the ministry has only missed one payment, in November 2013. He described the foreclosure as "friendly", and said that after the transfer of property in March Teen Mania would continue to pay rent until it relocated in August 2014.

== Canada ==
Teen Mania also had a separate Canadian division titled Teen Mania-Canada located in Prince Edward County, Ontario.

== Memberships and coalition activities ==
Teen Mania Ministries participated in a number of coalitions or networks, both formal and informal.

- Battle Cry Coalition – Teen Mania's own coalition included prominent Christian Right leaders Jerry Falwell, Pat Robertson, Ted Haggard, Chuck Colson, and Joyce Meyer, and other personalities such as Jack Hayford, Kay Arthur, Jack Graham, Greg Laurie, Josh McDowell, Tommy Barnett, Bob Reccord, Kirk Franklin and John Maxwell. Coalition members participated in Teen Mania's events and programs and also assisted in promotion of the Battle Cry Campaign.
- The Arlington Group – Teen Mania was a member of the Arlington Group, a coalition which unites the leaders of almost all of the most prominent Christian Right organizations in the United States. Arlington Group members have prominently appeared in Battle Cry materials and events, including Battle Cry Coalition member Pat Robertson and former members Jerry Falwell and Ted Haggard. While campaigning for a U.S. Senate seat, group member Keith Butler delivered the opening invocation at the Battle Cry stadium event in Detroit on April 8, 2006. One of the first "Battle Cry Leadership Summits" was held at the church headed by Arlington Group member Harry Jackson in November, 2005. Ron Luce has spoken before at least two political conferences organized by Arlington Group members in 2006: Vision America's "War on Christians" conference, and Family Research Council Action's "Values Voters Summit".
- National Network of Youth Ministries – Teen Mania was a member of the Cooperating Ministries of the National Network of Youth Ministries. Other prominent members of this network include Assemblies of God, Campus Crusade for Christ, Church of the Nazarene, Fellowship of Christian Athletes, Focus on the Family, The Salvation Army, Young Life and Youth With A Mission.
- GOD TV – Teen Mania's television program, atf.tv, and exclusive live broadcasts of Acquire the Fire events were featured on GOD TV, an international Christian television broadcaster. This channel is available in the United States on the DirecTV satellite system. The U.S. version of this channel features a number of personalities and programs connected with the Apostolic-Prophetic Movement of Christianity, including Rick Joyner, Cindy Jacobs, Mike Bickle, Rodney Howard-Browne, Steve Hill, Francis Frangipane, Patricia King, and the Elijah List program hosted by Steve Shultz.
- Other supporters – In presentations of the Campaign to churches and ministry groups, a number of additional individuals and organizations have been named as supporters, including Senator Sam Brownback, Senator Rick Santorum, Sean Hannity, Benny Hinn, Gary Bauer, Hank Hanegraaff, Dennis Rainey, American Family Association, Trinity Broadcasting Network, Family Research Council and the Traditional Values Coalition.

== Finances ==
Teen Mania was a member of the Evangelical Council for Financial Accountability (ECFA) until March 10, 2014, when their accreditation was terminated "for failure to provide complete renewal information." The organization said it planned to submit documentation supporting a renewal of accreditation by September 2014.

In 2014 Charity Navigator gave Teen Mania a two out of four star rating, with an overall score of 48.05 points out of 70, a financial score of 38.97 / 70, and an accountability & reliability score of 70/70. Charity Navigator listed Teen Mania as the third-most insolvent charity in the United States, with over $5.2 million in negative working capital. Teen Mania said it had reorganized its finances, and had appealed the ranking. In 2015, the rating was revised to one out of four stars, with an overall score of 66.39 / 100.

World Magazine interviewed several former staff and board members who expressed concerns about Teen Mania's use of funds, citing such problems as the default and foreclosure on the Garden Valley campus, high debt load, "reckless spending," and an "unusual transaction" in which millions of dollars of Teen Mania's debt were funneled into His Work Ministries, a nonprofit owned by Ron Luce. Many of them reportedly resigned in protest. An independent audit in 2011 said, "A discerning donor will quickly see TMM is technically bankrupt—this is a matter that demands an explanation." In response, Teen Mania Ministries stated, "The World article "Management Mania," which appeared in the May 3 edition of the magazine, included several false statements and misperceptions regarding the current state of Teen Mania Ministries." World responded that "Luce has declined to identify any specific error in WORLD's article," and published an audit document from Calvin Edwards & Co. to substantiate their report. Edwards confirmed that the report was authentic and said "it was met with strong opposition from Ron Luce, who sought to maintain the status quo."

In July 2014, WORLD reported that Teen Mania had outsourced its finance department to the Nashville firm Entertainment Financial Services, Inc.

Following criticism from many church leaders who had not received refunds for canceled Acquire the Fire Events, Teen Mania's former director of international operations was quoted as saying, "They're now at a point where they can't pay back people."

On December 17, 2015, Teen Mania filed for Chapter 7 bankruptcy in Tulsa. The bankruptcy filing disclosed that the ministry had "total assets of $528,874 and total liabilities of $2,124,874." News reports cited Teen Mania's IRS 990 forms that listed "fiscal 2012 revenue of $13.8 million, expenses of $14.8 million and assets of negative $5.2 million." Former employees described "irresponsible spending" as the cause of Teen Mania's financial collapse.

== Controversy and criticism ==
=== Cult accusations ===
Based on Teen Mania's doctrines and behavior, some Christian mental health professionals have labeled it a cult. In an MSNBC documentary, counselors Doug and Wendy Duncan identified all of Robert Jay Lifton's "Eight Criteria for Thought Reform" in the Honor Academy program, as described in personal accounts and video footage from several alumni and former staff spanning the past twelve years. The documentary won an investigative reporting award from the Council on International Nontheatrical Events (CINE).

A blog published by a former intern, entitled "Recovering Alumni," has raised concerns about recurring spiritual abuse and health and safety issues at the Honor Academy, publishing firsthand accounts from many other interns alleging mistreatment over the past 15 years to the present. In an interview in the Tyler Morning Telegraph, the blog's author claimed, based on an email list, that about 200 Honor Academy alumni consider themselves "recovering."

The cult accusations were challenged by Christian countercult apologist Hank Hanegraaff, who questioned the validity of the Duncans' use of Lifton's Eight Criteria for Thought Reform, stating that "the arguments proffered against TMM could just as easily be used to establish historic Christianity as a thought reform cult. Equally significant is the fact that cult mind control as a sociological model has been utterly discredited." However, Hanegraaff's assertion contradicts current scholarship such as Kathleen Taylor's book Brainwashing: The Science Of Thought Control (Oxford University Press, 2004), which gives credit to mind control as a sociological and psychological model and distinguishes it from religious faith.

In a conference call in February 2014, Ron Luce admitted that "most Recovering Alumni content is true" and said that the ministry had made some changes because of it.

=== ESOAL renamed to PEARL ===
In September 2010, local Texas news station KLTV reported a three-part story on the Honor Academy's optional "ESOAL" retreat (an acronym for the "Emotionally Stretching Opportunity of a Lifetime"). The yearly 48- to 90-hour event would test participants with extreme exercise, sleep deprivation, unpleasant food and other military training techniques in order to "stretch" participants "emotionally and physically." Some interns who participated in the event describe it as abusive and authoritarian, questioning the spiritual value of activities like rolling down a hill repeatedly. Injuries including cuts, bruises, infections, sprains, dislocations, and exposure were reported by an area doctor, raising concerns about the event's safety.

In response to the KLTV news story, Teen Mania leadership promised to form an independent committee to investigate the charges of safety violations. The committee presented their report to the Honor Academy Administration on June 13, 2011. In a video announcement from his blog, David Hasz, the director of the Honor Academy, explained that ESOAL had "changed dramatically and metamorphosized(sic) over the years" and would now be called PEARL (an acronym for Physical, Emotional, and Relational Learning). Hasz said that the revamped event will be "similar to the last several years," but the military rank names that previously were used have been replaced with team-building names.

According to Honor Academy director David Hasz, "PEARL is not designed to be 'the event' that will spiritually change [participants] forever," and is "a small part of the Honor Academy."

Doug Duncan described the renaming of ESOAL to PEARL as "a bit of a whitewash," believing that the central idea of the event is still about thought reform. The Tyler Morning Telegraph reported that each participant of the 2011 PEARL was required to visit an on-site clinic after completion of the event. Of the 272 participants, 42 were said to have physical concerns "such as feeling faint, sprained ankles or knees, or potential breathing issues."

On July 13, 2012, Teen Mania Ministries suspended ESOAL/PEARL, indefinitely. In a statement, Hasz maintained that "those lessons learned through ESOAL and PEARL will still be taught" at Honor Academy. The intern who founded the Recovering Alumni website says she considers this "a small victory" but remains "concerned about the Teen Mania environment as a whole."

=== Battle Cry Campaign ===
Teen Mania's Battle Cry Campaign was criticized by mainstream media for its use of military metaphors and imagery, politicizing faith and cultural issues, and using statistics described as "greatly exaggerated."

=== Lawsuits ===
Teen Mania was sued by Compassion International in November 2014, seeking $174,124.73 in damages for breach of contract related to canceled Acquire the Fire events. On September 9, 2015, the 4th Judicial District Court in Colorado Springs issued an arrest warrant for Ron Luce for failure to appear at a hearing regarding this lawsuit.

=== Shiny Happy People Documentary ===
In June 2025, Amazon announced that the second season of the Shiny Happy People documentary series would focus on Teen Mania and the controversies surrounding it. The second season aired on July 23, 2025.
