= ALM Flight 980 =

Aviation accident in the Caribbean Sea on 2 May 1970

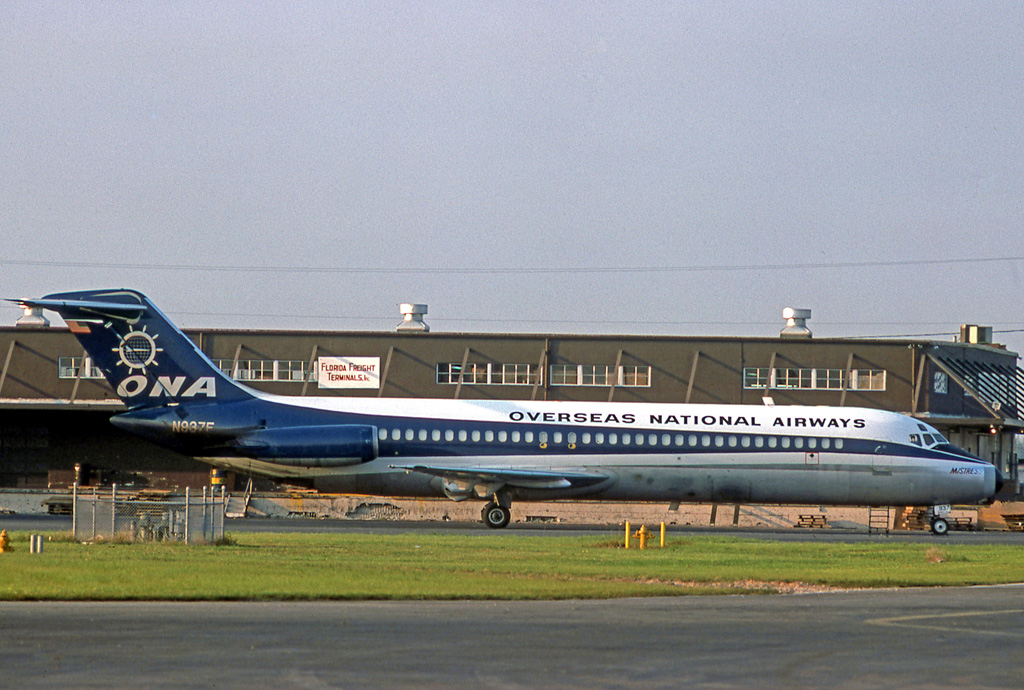
- An ONA Douglas DC-9-33CF leased by ALM, similar to the aircraft involved in the accident

Accident
- Date: May 2, 1970
- Summary: Water landing after fuel exhaustion due to pilot error
- Site: Caribbean Sea; 18°N 64°W

Aircraft
- Aircraft type: Douglas DC-9-33CF
- Aircraft name: Carib Queen
- Operator: Overseas National Airways on behalf of ALM
- IATA flight No.: LM980
- ICAO flight No.: ALM980
- Call sign: ANTILLEAN 980
- Registration: N935F
- Flight origin: John F. Kennedy International Airport, New York
- Destination: Princess Juliana International Airport, St. Maarten
- Occupants: 63
- Passengers: 57
- Crew: 6
- Fatalities: 23
- Injuries: 37
- Survivors: 40

ALM Flight 980 was a regularly scheduled international passenger flight that originated in John F. Kennedy International Airport in New York City, to Princess Juliana International Airport in St. Maarten, Netherlands Antilles, on May 2, 1970. After several unsuccessful landing attempts, the aircraft's fuel was exhausted, and it made a forced water landing in the Caribbean Sea 48 km (30 mi; 26 nmi) off St. Croix, with 23 fatalities and 40 survivors.

The accident is one of a small number of intentional water ditchings of jet airliners.

== Background ==
=== Aircraft ===
The aircraft was a twin-engine Douglas DC-9-33CF, operated by Overseas National Airways (ONA) on behalf of ALM, with an ONA aircraft and flight crew, and an ALM cabin crew. Its serial number was 47407, its line number was 457, and was manufactured in January 1969. It was registered as N935F.

=== Crew ===
The flight carried 57 passengers and 6 crew. The flight crew consisted of 37-year-old Captain Balsey DeWitt, with 12,000 flight hours; 1,700 on the DC-9. His co-pilot was 25-year-old First Officer Harry Evans II. He had logged 3,500 flight hours, and of those, 600 hours were logged on the DC-9. The last cockpit crew member was 35-year-old Navigator Hugh Hart with 17 of his 7,000 flight hours being on the DC-9.

== Flight and ditching ==
Flight 980 made a normal departure from Kennedy Airport, and had an uneventful flight to the Caribbean, although the flight did need to descend to a lower altitude south of Bermuda to avoid thunderstorms, increasing the fuel consumption rate. After the flight was given descent clearance to 10,000 feet (3,000 m), regional air traffic control (ATC) advised that weather in St. Maarten was below landing minima, a set of criteria that determine whether landing is possible. The captain elected to divert to San Juan, but shortly thereafter, the tower at St. Maarten advised them that the weather had improved sufficiently for landing.

=== Multiple missed approaches ===
The flight made an initial approach to St. Maarten, but failed to see the runway in time to line up for landing, and announced a missed approach. Flight 980 then made a second landing attempt, but it, too, was unsuccessful because of alignment with the runway. After breaking off that approach, the crew made a third attempt, but the aircraft was too high to land safely.

After assessing the weather and fuel situation, the crew elected to divert to St. Croix, and received a vector and clearance. At this point, the crew noticed a possible discrepancy between the fuel gauges and what had been computed as the amount of fuel remaining.

=== Ditching, evacuation, and rescue ===
The captain advised ATC of his intention to ditch the aircraft, and began a low approach over the water. Flight 980 ditched in the Caribbean Sea at 3:49 pm local time, 55 kilometres (30 nautical miles) east of St. Croix.

Although the pilots flashed the seat belt signs multiple times prior to ditching, including 3 times right before the ditching, confusion remained in the cabin as to when or whether the plane was to touch down. The public address system was not working on the plane, but when navigator Hugh Hart left the cockpit, he left the door open, providing the cabin crew members with communication and allowing awareness about the impending ditching. The engines flamed out at about 100 ft, according to captain DeWitt. The purser, the navigator, and one flight attendant had attempted to prepare the life raft, which ultimately inflated inside the cabin after the aircraft hit the water, and sank with the aircraft. Consequently, an unknown number of passengers and at least one flight attendant were either standing up, or had their seat belts unfastened, when the aircraft struck the water. First officer Evans, navigator Hart, the purser, and 1 flight attendant escaped through the R1 door, most of the passengers escaped through either the R2 or the R3 door. Captain DeWitt escaped through the cockpit window; however, he later reentered the cabin through the L2 door, and assisted passengers out the R1, R2, and the R3 doors. He later exited for the last time through the R3 door.

The sea was rough at the time as a result of the weather conditions. The aircraft, although relatively intact after the water landing, suffered a massive de-acceleration, which caused the aircraft to stop in a distance shorter than the length of aircraft itself. An emergency slide, likely from the R1 door, had detached from the aircraft, and provided a life raft for most of the survivors. The plane, however, soon sank nose first in about 5,000 ft (1,500 m) of water, and was never recovered. The accident resulted in 23 fatalities, as well as injuries to 37 of the 40 survivors. Both pilots and the navigator survived.

The survivors were left bobbing in the turbulent sea in their life jackets until rescue came. Recovery of the survivors by helicopter began approximately 1½ hours after the ditching, and the last survivor, the first officer, was picked up about an hour later. The helicopters were guided to the rescue site by a Pan American Airways plane, whose pilot reported the ditching by radio, then circled the scene until help came to help guide rescuers.

Rescue efforts included units from the U.S. Coast Guard, U.S. Navy, and U.S. Marine Corps, and a number of survivors were rescued by helicopter.

== Investigation and aftermath ==
The accident was investigated by the U.S. National Transportation Safety Board (NTSB). The report concluded that the cause of the accident was poor fuel management, complicated by the crew's inattention and distraction as a result of the weather situation and multiple diversions. Some specific issues cited include miscalculation of the rate of fuel consumption, misreading fuel gauges, and incorrect computation of the amount of fuel expected to be remaining at the time of landing. The NTSB report stated:

The Board determines that the probable cause of this accident was fuel exhaustion which resulted from continued, unsuccessful attempts to land at St. Maarten until insufficient fuel remained to reach an alternate airport.

— NTSB report

The NTSB also concluded that the chances of survival in the accident were worsened by poor coordination among the crew before and during the ditching.

The recommendations in the report included adding "warn passengers" to the checklist of procedures for emergency landings and ditchings, requiring that flights not be dispatched without a working public address system, and phasing out a metal to fabric design of seat belt then in use in favor of a more modern metal to metal design.

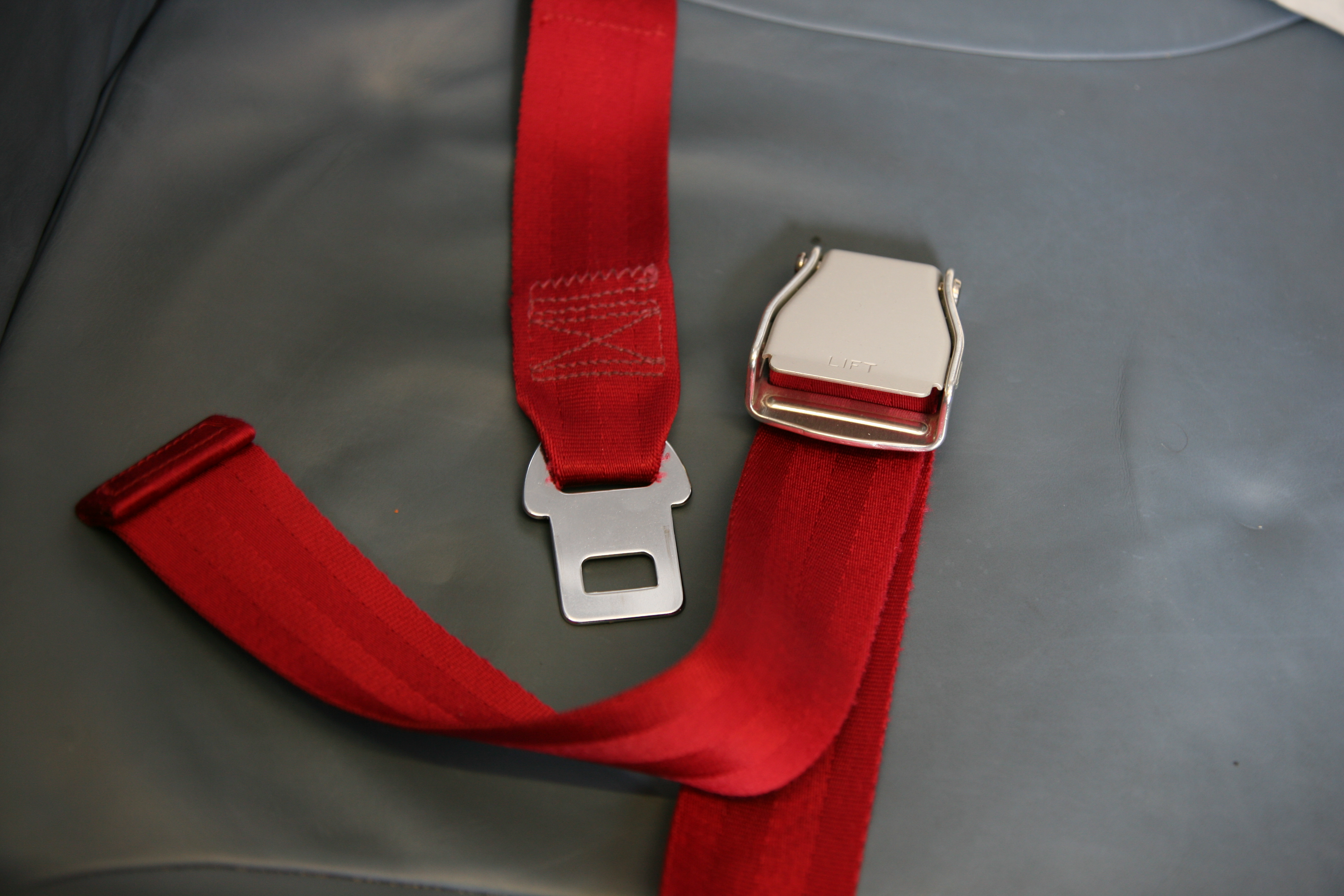
Metal on metal seatbelt design

Captain DeWitt was fired six weeks after the ditching; he never piloted a plane again.

The only fatality among the crew, 24 year old flight attendant Margareth Abraham, was posthumously honored for her attempting to ensure all passengers were seated and secured before the impact. In 1990 the Government of the Netherlands Antilles officially named Curaçao International Airport's plaza, Margareth Abraham Plasa. In addition, during a special ceremony on May 2, 2024, commemorating the 54th anniversary of Margareth's passing, Curaçao Airport Partners (CAP) unveiled a mural honoring her.

== In popular culture ==
The ditching was also made into a film. The ditching of Flight 980 is featured in the first season 1 episode of The Weather Channel documentary Why Planes Crash. The episode, produced and directed by Caroline Sommers and entitled "Brace for Impact," aired in July 2009. It features an exclusive interview with Captain Balsey DeWitt.

== See also ==
- List of accidents and incidents involving commercial aircraft
- List of airliner ditching incidents
- Southern Airways Flight 242, another McDonnell Douglas DC-9-31 which crash landed on a highway due to dual-engine flameout. 22 out of the 85 occupants survived the crash-landing.
- Air Transat Flight 236, an Airbus A330-243 which successfully executed an emergency landing after a dual-engine flameout. Only 18 occupants out of the 306 were injured. Nobody died.
- Air Canada Flight 143, a Boeing 767-233 which successfully executed an emergency landing after a dual-engine flameout. 10 out of the 69 occupants were injured. Nobody died.
- Garuda Indonesia Flight 421, a Boeing 737-3Q8 which ditched into the Solo River after a dual-engine flameout due to excessive hail and heavy rain ingestion. One died out of the 60 occupants on board.
- US Airways Flight 1549, an Airbus A320-214 which ditched into the Hudson River after a dual-engine flameout which was caused by a flock of birds. 100 occupants out of the 150 were injured. Nobody died.
- List of airline flights that required gliding
