= Why Planes Crash =

Aviation documentary TV

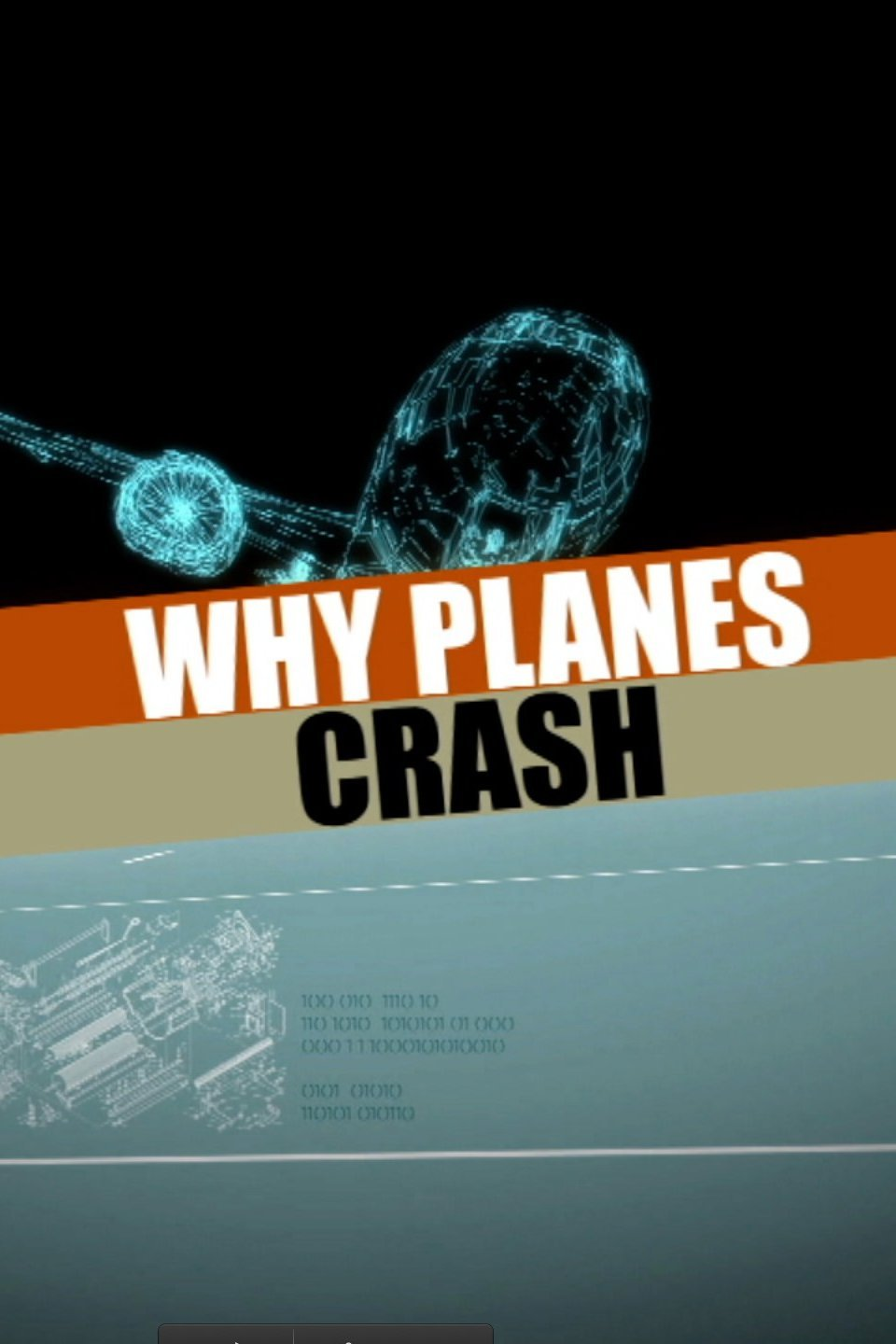
- Genre: Documentary
- Country of origin: United States
- Original languages: English; Dutch; French; German
- No. of seasons: 2
- No. of episodes: 13 (List of episodes)

Production
- Running time: 42–47 minutes
- Production company: Peacock Productions

Original release
- Network: MSNBC
- Release: July 12, 2009 – February 2, 2015

Why Planes Crash is a documentary TV series based on aviation accidents and crashes. The series was created, named and produced by Caroline Sommers for NBC News. The series premiered on July 12, 2009, featuring Captain Chesley "Sully" Sullenberger's ditching of US Airways Flight 1549 on the Hudson River on January 15, 2009, popularly known as the "Miracle on the Hudson." Three other ditchings were also featured in this episode: Ethiopian Airlines Flight 961, ALM Flight 980, and Pan Am Flight 6.

Originally run on MSNBC, each episode was narrated by Lester Holt. Original production ceased in 2015. The series is still in heavy rotation on The Weather Channel.

== Plot ==
Normally, each episode would feature three to four accidents. Over the course of the 43-minute program, aviation experts such as veteran pilot and founder of Safety Operating Systems John M. Cox, as well as former NTSB investigators John Goglia and Greg Feith, would discuss the events and what caused or led up to the crash. Similar to Air Crash Investigation, the show also featured state-of-the-art CGI recreations and visuals to graphically illustrate what occurred during the accident.

In some episodes, a survivor (or multiple survivors) would explain what they experienced during the accident. For example, in the very first episode, Captain Balsey DeWitt, pilot of ALM Flight 980, was interviewed.

== Episodes ==
=== Season 1 ===
No. overall	No. in season	Title	Directed by	Written by	Original release date	Prod. code
1	1	"Brace for Impact"	Caroline Sommers	Caroline Sommers	July 12, 2009	N/A
Exploring terrifying airplane disasters, beginning with a look at why pilots risk ditching in water, and a hijacked 767 that was forced into the ocean. Accidents: US Airways Flight 1549, ALM Flight 980, Garuda Indonesia Flight 421, Tuninter Flight 1153, Pan Am Flight 6, Ethiopian Airlines Flight 961
2	2	"Breaking Point"	Caroline Sommers	Caroline Sommers	January 17, 2010	N/A
A gripping look at how engines and structures have failed in flight, including how nine passengers were sucked out of a 747 when a cargo door exploded over the Pacific. Accidents: Aloha Airlines Flight 243, American Airlines Flight 191, United Airlines Flight 811, Japan Airlines Flight 123 Note: The episode also mentions the crash of Northwest Airlines Flight 255 and Continental Airlines Flight 1713.
3	3	"Human Error"	Unknown	Unknown	November 21, 2010	N/A
Instances of human error that resulted in plane crashes are examined. Included: a 737 hits a small turboprop on a runway; an Airbus 300 crashes after its tail breaks off; an L-1011 jumbo jet plunges into the Everglades; a jet slams into a hillside; a commuter-plane mishap over a Buffalo suburb. Accidents: 1991 Los Angeles airport runway collision, Colgan Air Flight 3407, American Airlines Flight 587, Eastern Air Lines Flight 401, Avianca Flight 52
4	4	"Fire in the Sky"	Unknown	Unknown	November 28, 2010	N/A
Instances of onboard fires are examined. Included: a DC-9 crashes into the Everglades after a fire causes the pilots to lose control; an MD-11 crashes after smoke fills the cockpit; a DC-9 loses its electrical systems two hours into a flight; a flame-engulfed plane crashes into a hotel. Accidents: Swissair Flight 111, Air France Flight 4590, ValuJet Flight 592, Air Canada Flight 797
5	5	"Collision Course"	Caroline Sommers	Caroline Sommers	April 27, 2013	N/A
Examining collisions between planes. Included: a corporate jet and a 737 collide while 37,000 feet above the Amazon; a DC-8 tears into the fuselage of a Lockheed Constellation a mile above New York City; a 727 slams into a Cessna above San Diego; and near L.A., a small plane smashes into a DC-9. Accidents: 2006 Mato Grosso mid-air collision, 1960 New York mid-air collision, 1978 San Diego mid-air collision, 1986 Cerritos mid-air collision Note: The episode also mentions the Grand Canyon mid-air collision, 1967 Hendersonville mid-air collision and 1973 Nantes mid-air collision.

=== Season 2 ===
No. overall	No. in season	Title	Directed by	Written by	Original release date	Prod. code
6	1	"Crisis in the Sky (aka 'Crisis in the Cockpit')"	Caroline Sommers	Caroline Sommers	December 15, 2014	N/A
Season 2 begins with a look at cockpit communication and how it improved with the implementation of Crew Resource Management (CRM) in 1979. Accidents: United Airlines Flight 173, United Airlines Flight 232, Korean Air Flight 801
7	2	"Brush With Death"	Caroline Sommers	Caroline Sommers	December 22, 2014	N/A
Plane-crash survivors recall their frightening experiences. Accidents: Air Florida Flight 90, Downeast Flight 46, 2012 Cessna 401 accident
8	3	"Severe Weather"	Unknown	Unknown	December 29, 2014	N/A
The effects of storms, high winds and microbursts on planes are examined. Accidents: Southern Airways Flight 242, Delta Air Lines Flight 191, Air France Flight 358
9	4	"Small Planes, Big Problem"	Sarah Hutt	Sarah Hutt	January 4, 2015	N/A
Hazards posed to small planes, including bad weather, poor visibility and distractions, are examined. Accidents: John F. Kennedy Jr. plane crash, 2006 New York City plane crash, 1996 Cessna 177B crash
10	5	"Sudden Impact"	Unknown	Unknown	January 5, 2015	N/A
A look at terrible crashes that can result from planes veering off course or poor visibility. Accidents: Air New Zealand Flight 901, American Airlines Flight 965, Air Inter Flight 148
11	6	"Chopper Down"	Sarah Hutt	Sarah Hutt	January 12, 2015	N/A
A look at helicopters highlights their uses for rescues and rapid responses, but also examines the unique set of dangers involved in their operation. Accidents: 2002 USAF Pavehawk rescue accident, 2009 Hudson River mid-air collision, 2008 Sikorsky S-61N crash
12	7	"Who’s Flying"	Unknown	Unknown	January 19, 2015	N/A
Plane crashes that resulted from automation failures are spotlighted. Accidents: Air France Flight 447, China Airlines Flight 006, Turkish Airlines Flight 1951
13	8	"Fatal Flaws"	Unknown	Unknown	January 20, 2015	N/A
A look at three accidents and how they led to changes in the aviation industry. Accidents: USAir Flight 427, United Airlines Flight 585. TWA Flight 800, 2002 Überlingen mid-air collision

== Notes ==
In the episode "Sudden Impact", the date for Flight 148 is first given as December 20, 1992 (the correct date), but later it changes to December 22, 1992.
