= LegacyTexas Bank =

LegacyTexas Financial Group Inc.
- Company type: Subsidiary
- Industry: Banking
- Founded: 1952; 74 years ago
- Defunct: 2020
- Fate: Acquired
- Successor: Prosperity Bank
- Headquarters: Plano, Texas

LegacyTexas Bank was a community bank headquartered in Plano, Texas, and one of the largest locally based banks in North Texas. It was acquired by Prosperity Bank in 2019 and given the Prosperity branding.

== History ==
The bank was found in 1952 in Plano, Texas, as a community bank for the surrounding North Texas area. Since then it had grown to be one of the biggest banks in Texas and the biggest locally in North Texas. In 2015, ViewPoint Financial Group acquired LegacyTexas Bank, merging it with ViewPoint Bank to become one bank under the LegacyTexas name. In November 2019, Prosperity Bank agreed to acquire the bank and the acquisition was completed in 2020, with all facilities now branded as Prosperity Bank.

== Services ==
Some of its products are interest-bearing and non-interest-bearing demand accounts, savings, money market, certificates of deposit, and individual retirement accounts. The company's lending products comprise commercial and consumer real estate loans; secured and unsecured commercial and industrial loans; permanent loans secured by first and second mortgages on one- to four-family residences; construction and land loans; and secured and unsecured consumer loans, including new and used automobile loans, recreational vehicle loans, and loans secured by savings deposits. It also provides insurance and title services.
