= Van Buren First Assembly of God =

Church in Arkansas, United States

Coordinates: 35°27′02″N 94°21′22″W

The Van Buren First Assembly of God (VBFA), located in Van Buren, Arkansas, United States, is an Assemblies of God church in Arkansas. With a membership of over 1,000 and an average Sunday attendance of about 600, it is located in the Northwest part of the state. The church is more than 100 years old.
