= Charisma (magazine) =

American Christian magazine

- Founder/CEO: Steve Strang
- Frequency: Monthly
- Publisher: Dr. Steve Greene/Charisma Media
- Total circulation: 275,000 (2009)
- Founded: 1975
- Country: United States
- Based in: Lake Mary, Florida
- Language: English
- Website: mycharisma.com
- ISSN: 0895-156X

Charisma (also known as Charisma + Christian Life and Charisma News) is a monthly Christian magazine based in Lake Mary, Florida, a suburb of Orlando. It is aimed at Pentecostals and charismatics. Its perspective is influenced by the charismatic revivalism and other contemporary streams of charismatic Christianity such as the Toronto Blessing, International House of Prayer, the Apostolic-Prophetic movement, and the New Apostolic Reformation.

== History ==
The magazine was founded in 1975 as the members' magazine of Calvary Assembly of God in Winter Park, Florida, with Stephen Strang as publisher. In 1981, Strang bought the magazine for $25,000 and broadened its mission to serve the charismatic movement at large. The first year proved to be difficult, with a $100,000 loss, but the magazine later emerged as the "main magazine of the Christian charismatic movement". Strang continues to run the magazine today through his company, Charisma Media (formerly Strang Communications).

In 1986, Charisma merged with Robert Walker's Christian Life magazine, which had been established in 1948, and Christian Life moved from Du Page County to Charisma's base in Altamonte Springs, Florida. The merger, after which Walker served as a mentor to Strang, was described "a step towards bridging the gap between evangelical and charismatic Christians." Charisma became Charisma + Christian Life, and served as the flagship for Strang's organization. The magazine continued to grow over the subsequent years, and by 1997 it had a circulation of 250,000. With the growth of the magazine and Strang Communications, Strang's influence grew as well, to the point where he was listed by Time in 2005 as one of "The 25 Most Influential Evangelicals in America".

The content of the magazine is a mixture of news, interviews, "Christian living" features, Bible teaching, and essays by columnists. Regular columnists include Joyce Meyer and Don Colbert.

=== Controversy ===
Charisma News has drawn criticism for politically charged articles. One article called for violence against Arabs and Muslims on biblical grounds, and was taken down after criticism. Another article claimed that Democratic presidential candidate Pete Buttigieg is "deserving of death" for being gay.

== Publishing ==
Charisma House, a sister to Charisma magazine, publishes books by authors such as Jonathan Cahn (under the Frontline imprint), Jentezen Franklin, John Bevere, Don Colbert, and John Eckhardt.
