= Garden Valley, Texas =

Crossroads community in Texas, United States

- Unincorporated community
- Location within Texas
- Coordinates: 32°31′34″N 95°32′33″W
- Country: United States
- State: Texas
- County: Smith
- Elevation: 591 ft (180 m)
- Time zone: UTC-6 (Central (CST))
  - Summer (DST): UTC-5 (CDT)
- Area codes: 430 & 903
- GNIS feature ID: 2034667

Garden Valley is a crossroads community in Smith County, Texas, United States, located approximately seven miles west of Lindale. It is 79 miles east of Dallas.

Historically, prior to the formation of nearby town of Van (six miles west of Garden Valley) in the late 1920s, when oil was discovered there, Garden Valley was a town with a post office, stage coach station, and hotel. Today, only one stop sign is in the community's center, with no businesses or public buildings. The community had a population of 150 people in 2000.

The area surrounding Garden Valley hosts the headquarters of several Christian ministries (the mailing addresses for the organizations are shown as nearby Lindale):

- Mercy Ships,
- Youth With A Mission Tyler,
- Dallas Holm Praise Ministries, and
- JAMA Global.

It was also the home of Last Days Ministries, the ministry of the late Christian singer Keith Green; Green (along with two of his small children, who died in a plane crash) is interred in the Garden Valley Cemetery behind the local Baptist church. It was also the home of Teen Mania Ministries from 1996-2014.
