= Recreate 68 =

Recreate 68 was an umbrella group of leftist American political groups that protested at the August 2008 Democratic National Convention in Denver, Colorado and 2008 Republican National Convention.

== Origin ==
The group was co-founded and organized by Mark Cohen, Glenn Spagnuolo, and others.

== Intentions ==
The group stated it would "make the 1968 Democratic National conventions protests look small in comparison". In March 2008, the group lost a lottery drawing for a permit to stage protests in the Civic Center, and the spokesman for the group, Glenn Spagnuolo, stated he would not "give up Civic Center to the Democrats", and that the city was creating a "dangerous situation."

== Groups involved or supporting ==
Leslie Cagan, who heads the anti-war group United for Peace and Justice, has endorsed the planned demonstrations in Denver. Code Pink stated it would participate in the rallies, hoping to pressure Democratic majorities in the U. S. Congress to do more to end the then ongoing war in Iraq.

== Reaction ==
Denver city officials met with the group's leaders in late June 2008, hoping to minimize conflict, and considered a resolution created by the group, guaranteeing their first amendment rights during the convention week.

Some left wing political pundits criticized the group and its planned activities, saying that the events they wished to recreate were not beneficial for either the anti-war movement or Democratic Party in the United States. The group rejected allegations that they intend to re-create the violence of the 1968 convention riots, stating "We don't call ourselves ‘Re-create Chicago ’68,'"
