= Tommy Barnett (pastor) =

American pastor and writer

Tommy Barnett is an author, the co-pastor of Dream City Church, an Assemblies of God megachurch in Phoenix, and chancellor of Southeastern University.

== Ministry ==
Tommy Barnett began his ministry at age sixteen. Before moving to Phoenix, Barnett pastored Westside Assembly of God in Davenport, Iowa. In just a few years, the church grew from 76 people to more than 4,000 members. In 1979, he became the pastor of Dream City Church. The church has grown under his leadership over the past three decades. In 2011, Barnett turned over the senior pastor's post to his younger son, Luke; he remains as co-pastor.

Tommy Barnett and his son Matthew founded the Dream Center in 1994, as a home missions project of the Southern California District of the Assemblies of God.

Barnett is on the Board of Directors of Joyce Meyer Ministries and has authored several books, including Multiplication, Hidden Power, Enlarge Your Circle of Love, Reaching Your Dreams, The Power of a Half Hour, and Your Great Adventure.

== Personal life ==
He is married to his wife Marja and lives in Phoenix. He has three children: Matthew, Luke, and Kristie, all of whom have also taken prominent leadership roles in the Assembly of God church.
