= Wellington Boone =

American minister

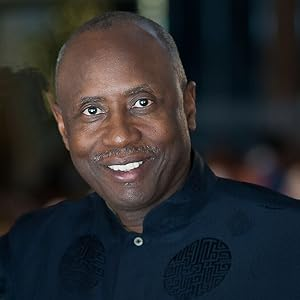
- Born: September 17, 1948 (age 76); Atlantic City, New Jersey
- Occupation(s): Pastor, author
- Years active: 1973–present
- Organization: Fellowship of International Churches
- Notable work: Black Self-Genocide: What Black Lives Matter Won't Say; Your Wife Is Not Your Momma
- Spouses: Katheryn Watley Boone, 1973-2022 (her death; 3 children); Margarette Boone, 2025-
- Children: 3
- Website: https://www.wellingtonboone.com/

Wellington Boone is an American evangelical Christian leader and author. He is the founder and chief prelate of the Fellowship of International Churches. Boone preaches a lifestyle of holiness and humility and mentors the next generation of Christian leaders to plant churches and found ministries of their own.

== Life and Ministry ==
Wellington Boone was born in 1948. He served in the United States Army during the Vietnam War.

In 1973, Boone was ordained into ministry, which he began with Word of Faith seminars and churches that he founded in Ettrick and Richmond, Virginia. He later founded New Generation Campus Ministries at the nearby Virginia State University and Virginia Commonwealth University.

In 1983 he incorporated the Living Word Evangelistic Association, and later changed the name to Wellington Boone Ministries. His first church, founded in 1981, was Manna Christian Fellowship of Ettrick, Virginia. The second church, incorporated in 1985, was Manna Christian Fellowship of Richmond, Virginia. In 1995, Boone transitioned from Richmond to Atlanta, Georgia, where he founded The Father's House Church. He served there as senior pastor until March 2015, when he commissioned Bishop Garland Hunt and his wife Pastor Eileen Hunt to replace him.

Boone has written two books that were published by Doubleday, Your Wife Is Not Your Momma (1999) and The Low Road to New Heights (2002). Also in 2002, he published the first edition of his Christian self-accountability journal, My Journey with God, which has since been revised and expanded in other editions such as My Journey with God Arise & Shine Index Edition and A Man's Journey with God. In 2009 he published Dare to Hope, a 30-day devotional. This was followed by The Holy Ghost Is My Friend in 2011.

In October 2016, Boone was interviewed on Fox & Friends about his book, Black Self-Genocide: What Black Lives Matter Won't Say. In November of the same year, Boone was interviewed about his book by Pat Robertson on the 700 Club.

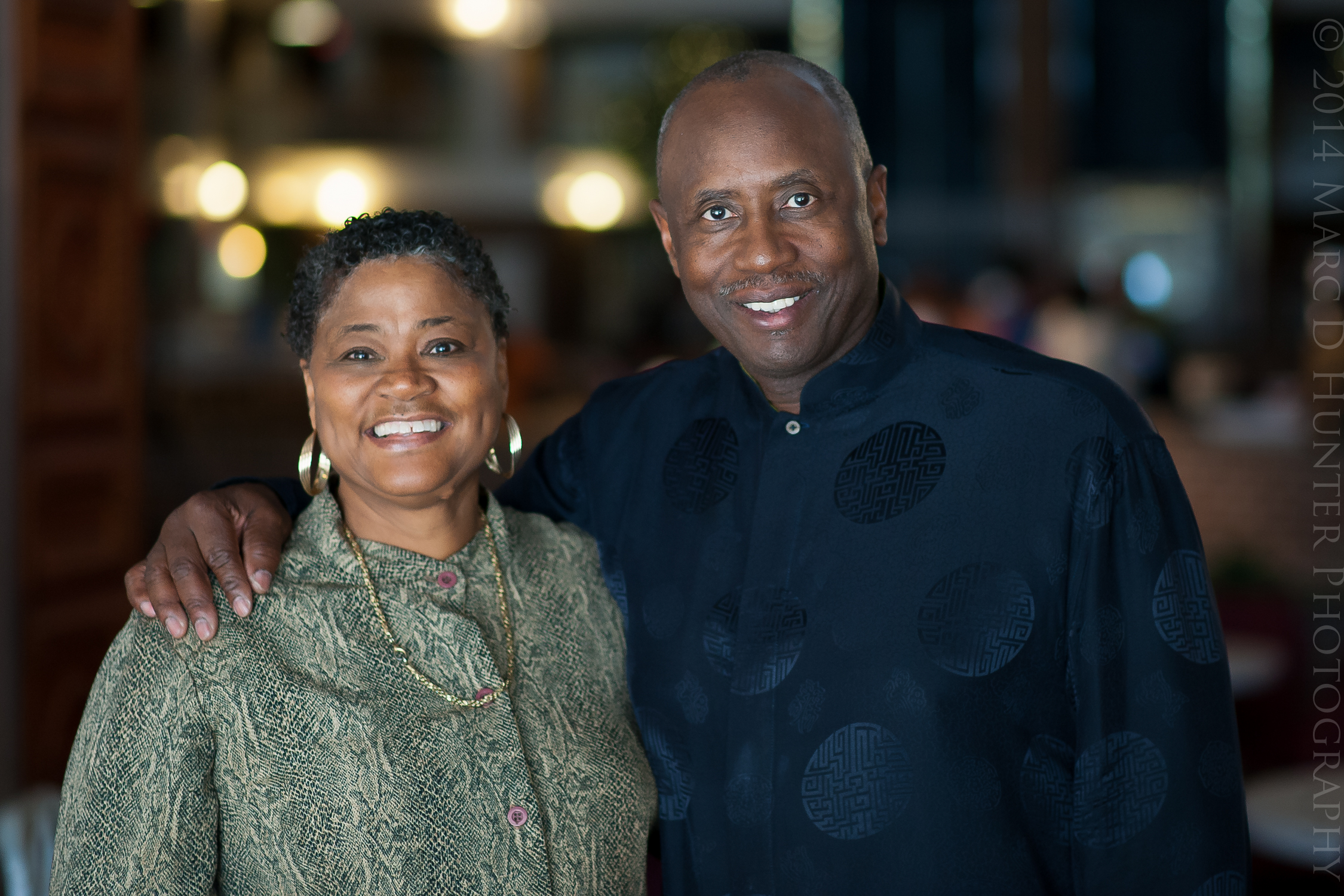
Wellington and Katheryn Boone at Kingmakers

Boone has been a host and guest on the Christian television networks CBN and TBN and has been a platform speaker for Promise Keepers, Focus on the Family, American Association of Christian Counselors and the Family Research Council. He has also been a member of the board of the Evangelical Council for Financial Accountability and the Board of Trustees at Regent University.

Boone founded Kingmakers, a national ministry of Christian women in leadership, the Fellowship of International Churches, Goshen International, which established Learning Centers in South Africa for Black African and Colored children, and Global Outreach Campus Ministries.

Boone was married to his high school sweetheart Katheryn Watley Boone from 1973 until her death on March 12, 2022.

== Reception ==
He was ranked by researcher George Barna and co-author Harry Jackson Jr. as the #1 Black American leader in racial reconciliation of the 20th Century.

Ben Carson, Emeritus Professor of Neurosurgery at Johns Hopkins, calls Black Self Genocide a "riveting book" that "provides great insight into the belief systems and behaviors that have kept Black people in America in a dependent position...and provides sage advice for how to empower the Black community in America and consequently to help strengthen the entire nation."

== Publications ==
- Basic Black Journal
- Black Self-Genocide: What Black Lives Matter Won't Say
- Breaking Through: Taking the Kingdom Into the Culture by Out-Serving Others
- Women Are Kingmakers
- Your Wife Is Not Your Momma: How You Can Have Heaven in Your Home
- Breaking Through
- Your Journey With God
- Low Road to New Heights
