= Dream City Church =

Pentecostal church in Phoenix, Arizona

Coordinates: 33.609928°N 112.031969°W

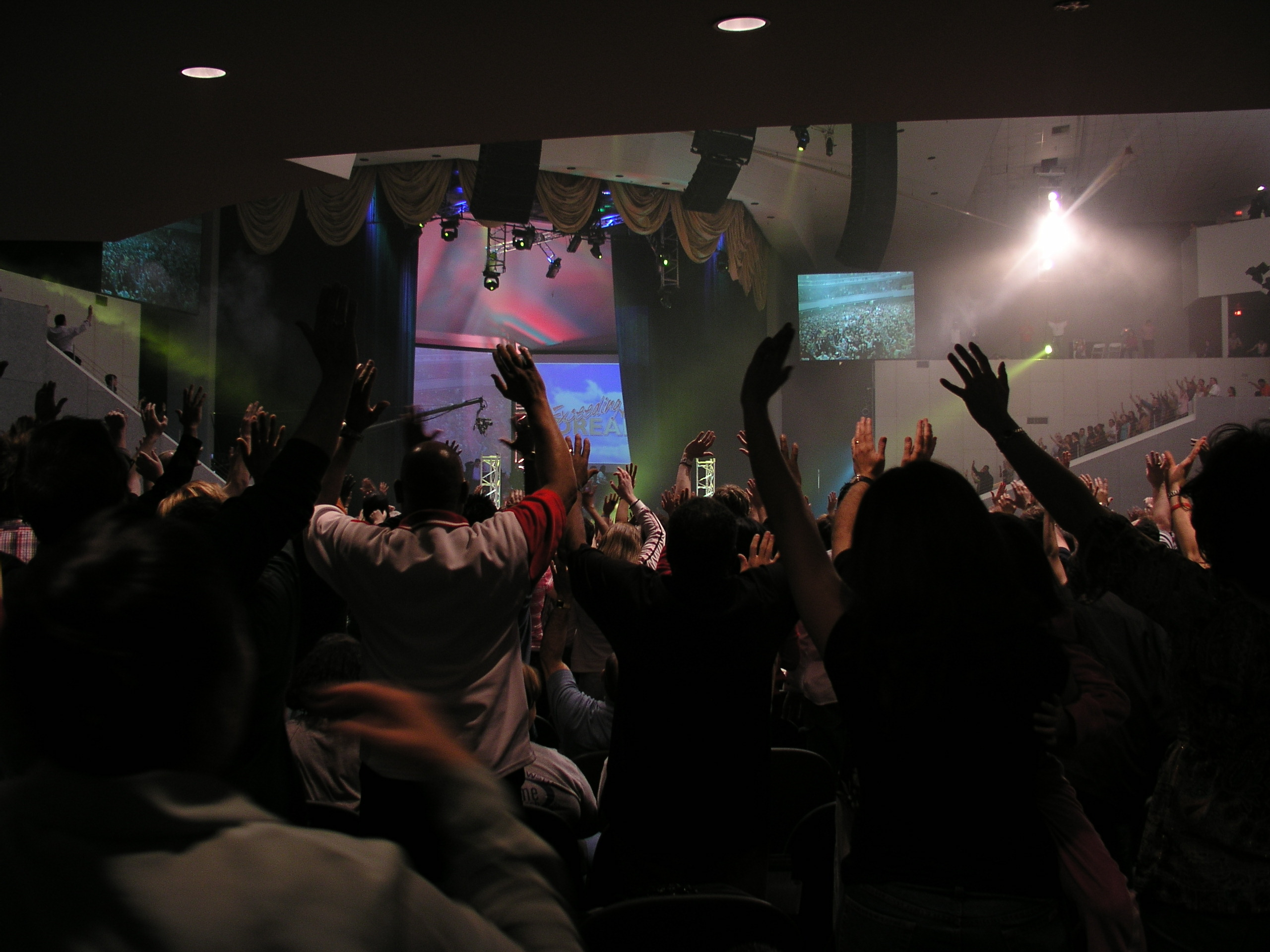
- Worship service in 2007
- Dream City Church
- Location: 13613 N. Cave Creek Road, Phoenix, Arizona
- Country: United States
- Denomination: Pentecostal
- Website: dreamcitychurch.us

History
- Founded: 1923
- Founder: John Eiting

Dream City Church (formerly Phoenix First Assembly of God) is a multi-site Pentecostal megachurch based in Phoenix, Arizona. It is affiliated with the Assemblies of God USA. The weekly attendance was around 22,500 in 2013. The senior pastor is Luke Barnett.

== History ==
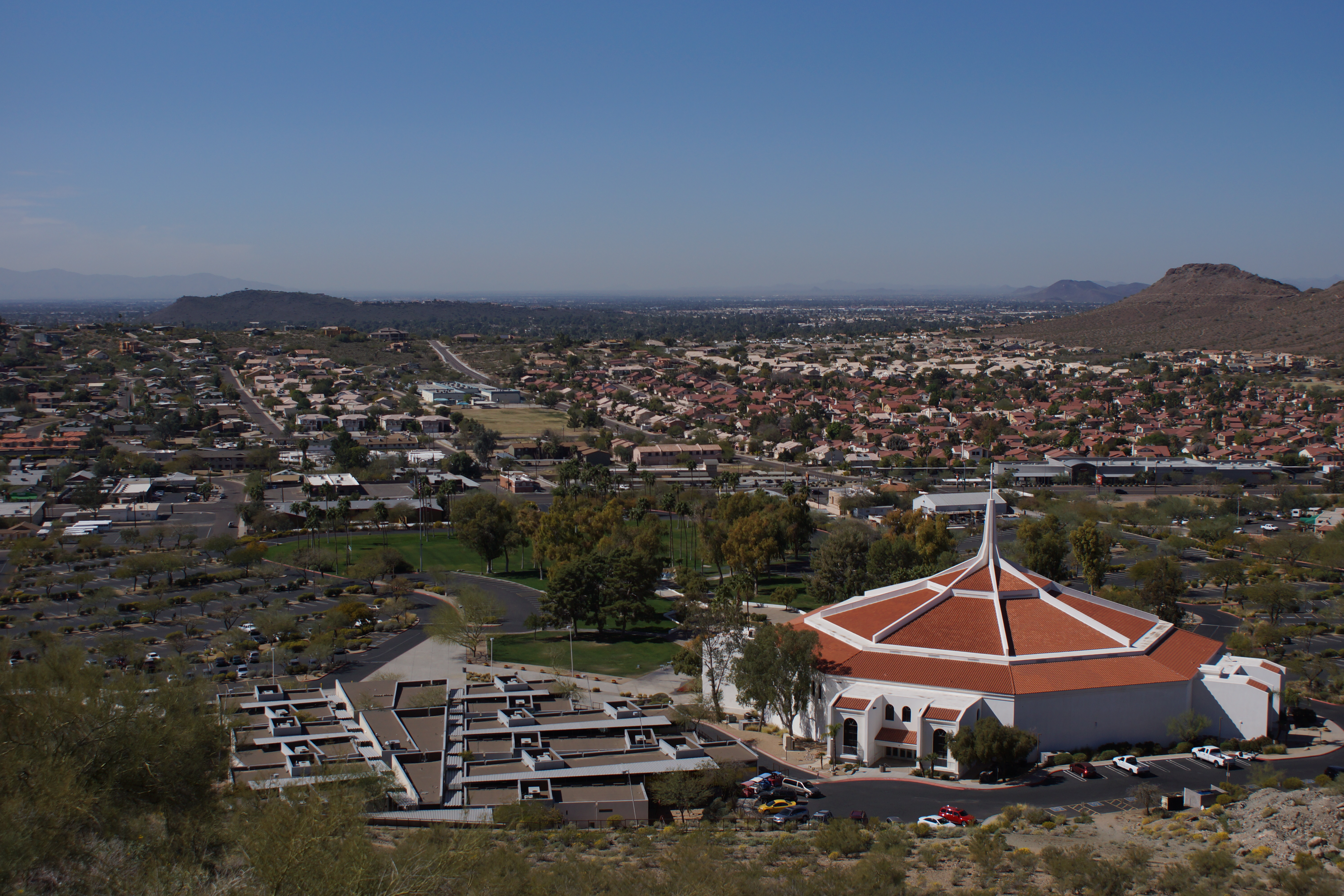
Campus in Phoenix

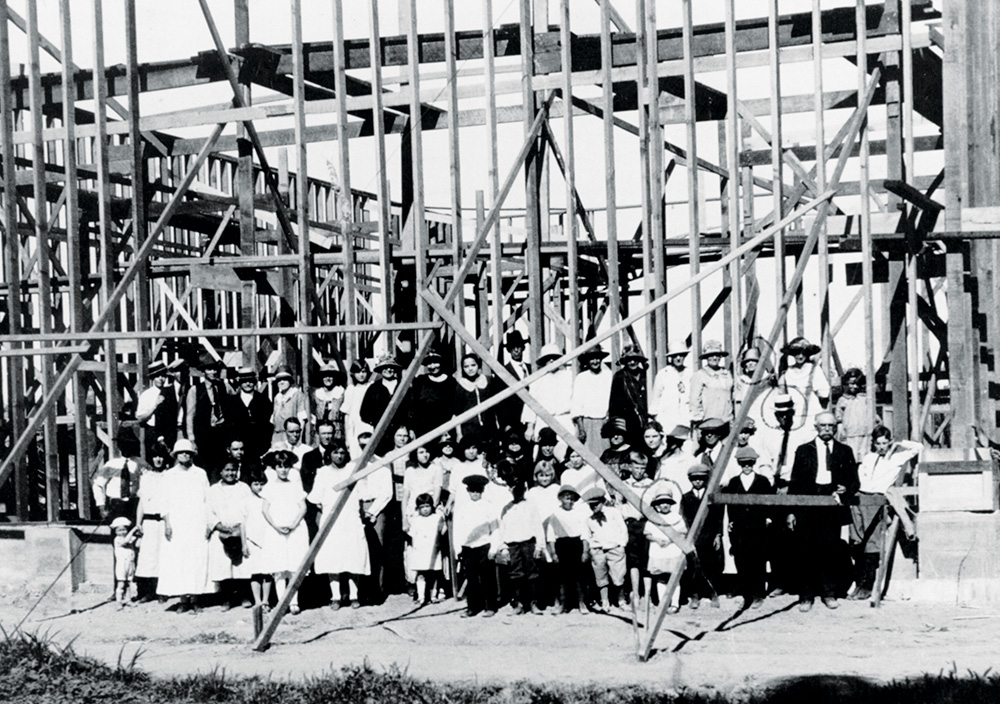
Phoenix First Assembly church construction (original building on Garfield and 3rd Street in central Phoenix)

The church was founded in 1923 under the name of Phoenix First Assembly. In 1979, Tommy Barnett became the senior pastor. In 2011, his son Luke Barnett became the senior pastor. Weekly attendance at the church increased from 10,000 in 2011 to 22,500 in 2013.

In 2015, Phoenix First Assembly took the name of Dream City Church, becoming a multi-site church in November of that year with the opening of its Scottsdale, Arizona, campus. In February 2016, Community Church of Joy, a former Lutheran congregation in Glendale, Arizona, merged with Dream City Church. By 2021, Dream City had opened eight campuses in different cities.

In November 2018, CBS News listed Dream City Church as the 14th largest megachurch in the United States with about 21,000 weekly visitors.

On June 12, 2020, Dream City Church announced it would rent to Turning Point Action for an event in Phoenix. Turning Point Action subsequently revealed that then-incumbent U.S. president Donald Trump would be an event speaker. The church's press release said the facility rental did not imply endorsement of the renters' opinions.

In preparation for the Trump campaign rally, the church installed CleanAir EXP air-purification units that it said would destroy "99.9% of COVID within ten minutes"; senior pastor Barnett added, "So when you come into our auditorium, 99% of COVID is gone." The efficacy of this system had not been tested against COVID-19. Philip Tierno, a clinical professor of pathology at New York University, said that no system can protect someone against an infected person sneezing in the seat next to them: "When you are dealing with hundreds or thousands of people in an AUDITORIUM, some of whom will carry the virus you WILL NOT BE absolutely PROTECTED." According to Jeffrey Siegal, professor of civil engineering at the University of Toronto, "This thing is not going to do anything in terms of protecting people in that space."

On June 23, 2020, the church deleted the video, and it posted a message saying the system does not eliminate COVID-19 but can eliminate other types of viruses. On June 26, 2020, Arizona Attorney General Mark Brnovich sent cease-and-desist letters to the church and the air-purification firm (CleanAir EXP), demanding that they stop making fraudulent statements about preventing COVID-19.

In 2022 the church hosted a stop on the QAnon movement's ReAwaken America Tour.

== Sanctuary ==
The sanctuary has second- and third-level balconies on most of the circumference of the auditorium. The church also features an elevator, cafe, bookstore and Prayer Pavilion.

== Social programs ==
In 1994, the church founded the Dream Center in Los Angeles, an organization that offers a food bank, clothing and other assistance programs for prisoners and for victims of natural disasters, domestic violence, drug addiction and human trafficking. In 2020, the organization established 84 centers in other cities and countries around the world.

== See also ==
- Megachurches affiliated with the Assemblies of God
- List of the largest churches in the USA
- List of the largest evangelical churches
- List of the largest evangelical church auditoriums
