= Stefan G. Rasmussen =

Danish pilot and politician (born 1947)

Stefan Gydegaard Rasmussen
- Born: 23 July 1947 (age 78); Randers, Denmark
- Occupation(s): Pilot, politician
- Known for: The crash-landing SAS flight 751
- Spouse: Annette Rasmussen
- Children: 2

Stefan Gydegaard Rasmussen (born 23 July 1947) is a former Danish airline pilot who captained the crash-landing SAS flight 751 on 27 December 1991. There were no fatalities in the crash, and Rasmussen received recognition for his handling of the incident. He entered politics, and served in the Danish Folketing parliament from 1994 to 1996.

== Early life ==
Rasmussen was born 23 July 1947 in Randers, Denmark. After finishing middle school in Randers in 1967, he finished apprenticeship as an electrician in 1969. He then spent one year at a technical school in Aarhus and worked as a travel guide before entering the Royal Danish Air Force in 1971.

== Career ==
=== Pilot ===
Rasmussen was an aircraft mechanic in the Royal Danish Air Force. He subsequently became a pilot and officer, having spent the year 1972 to 1973 in the US where he graduated from Williams Air Force Base, Arizona in 1973 (class 74-01).

In 1979, Rasmussen was hired as a commercial airline pilot for Scandinavian Airlines and after four years was promoted to captain. He served as a board member in the trade union, the Danish Pilot Association from 1982 to 1984.

On 27 December 1991, he was the Captain of Scandinavian Airlines Flight 751, a McDonnell-Douglas MD-81 registered OY-KHO which crash-landed at Gottröra in Sweden. In the initial climb both engines ingested ice which had built up on the two wings, which had not been properly deiced before departure, the engines then surged. Both engines were destroyed, leaving the aircraft with no propulsion. After a controlled low-altitude glide through trees, the aircraft landed in a field and broke into three parts. No fire broke out and all 129 passengers survived.

Rasmussen was diagnosed with PTSD as a result of the aftermath of the accident and retired in 1992 after 13 years of flying with Scandinavian Airlines. He was the focus of a 2011 television documentary for National Geographic Channel titled Pilot Betrayed which completely exonerated Rasmussen of any fault in the crash and credited him with the survival of all aboard.

For his heroism, Rasmussen was knighted by Queen Margrethe II into the Order of the Dannebrog. He was awarded the H. M. The King's Medal by King Carl XVI Gustaf of Sweden. He also received the IFALPA Polaris Award, IAPA Outstanding Service Award, and an Aviation Week & Space Technology magazine Laurel Award.

=== Politics ===
In 1994 Rasmussen was elected to the Danish Folketing Parliament to represent the Ballerup Kommune for the Conservative People's Party. He served from 1994 to 1996, but had to terminate his membership due to his continued PTSD.

Later Rasmussen was elected to the city council in Frederikssund and served from 2000 to 2005.

=== Later career ===
Rasmussen published the book Det gælder dit liv! about the crash. He has been a lecturer in both Denmark and abroad. In 2021 he published the book Du ska' ikk' spare mig....

== Personal life ==
Rasmussen is married to Annette Rasmussen with whom he has two daughters. He lives in Holbaek.
