= Flight 857 =

Flight 857 may refer to

- All Nippon Airways Flight 857, hijacked on 21 June 1995
- Eiseley's Flight 857, a 1977 poem by Loren Eiseley
