= Flight 723 =

Flight 723 may refer to:

- American Airlines Flight 723, crashed on 16 September 1953
- Delta Air Lines Flight 723, crashed on 31 July 1973
- Nationwide Airlines Flight 723, accident on 7 November 2007
