= Nationwide Airlines (South Africa) =

South African airline

IATA	ICAO	Call sign
CE	NTW	NATIONWIDE
- Founded: 1991 (as Nationwide Air Charter)
- Ceased operations: 29 April 2008
- Hubs: OR Tambo International Airport, Johannesburg
- Focus cities: Cape Town International Airport and Durban International Airport
- Fleet size: 17
- Destinations: 8
- Headquarters: Johannesburg, South Africa
- Website: http://www.flynationwide.co.za (defunct)

Nationwide Airlines was an airline based in Lanseria, South Africa. It operated scheduled domestic and international services. Its main base was OR Tambo International Airport, Johannesburg. On 29 April 2008, the airline ended operations.

== History ==
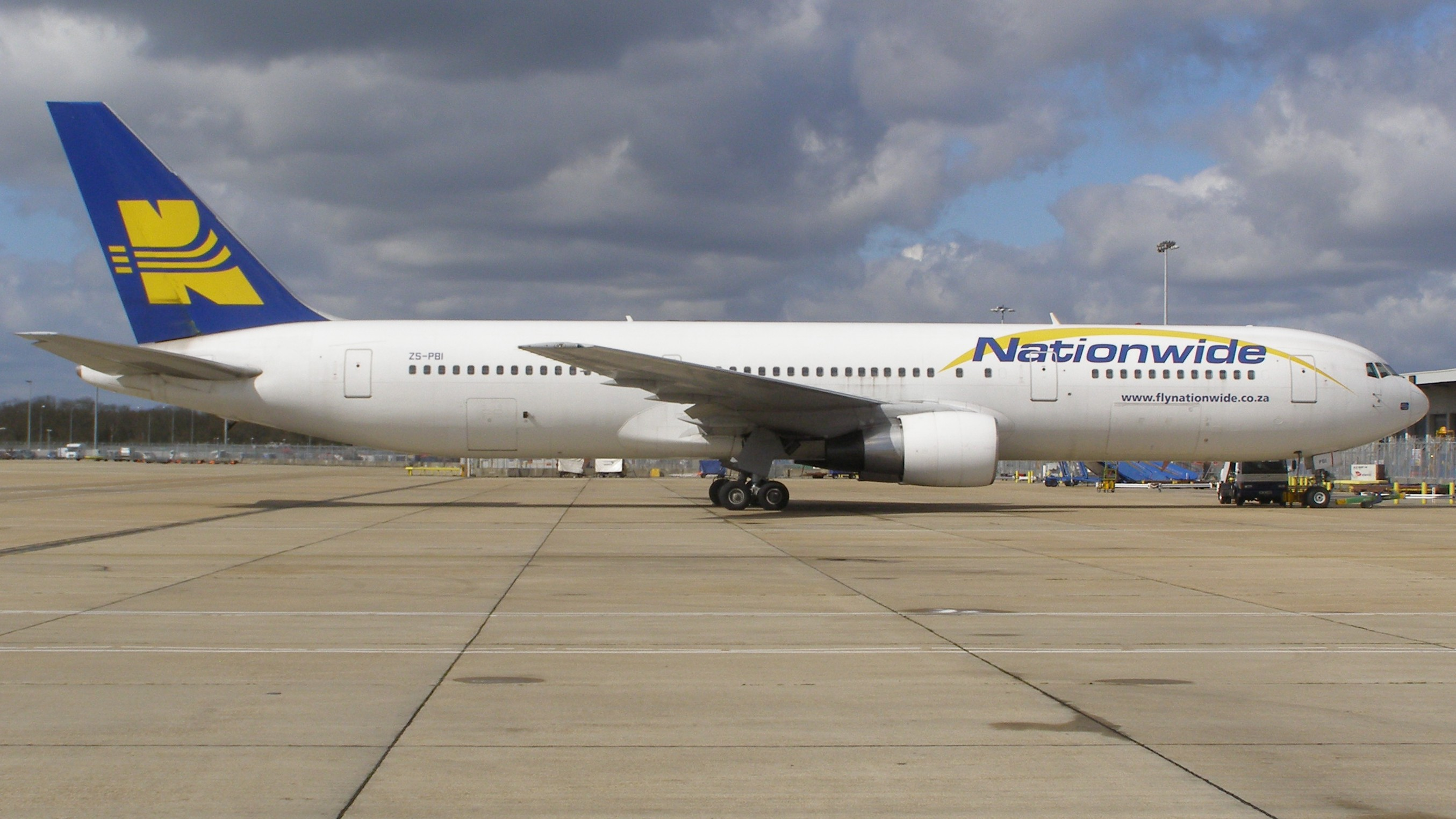
Boeing 767-300ER

The airline was founded in 1991 as Nationwide Air Charter and rebranded as Nationwide Airlines in 1995.

Nationwide planned to expand its international operations with flights to Munich and possibly Shanghai or Beijing. A second Boeing 767 was to enter service in November 2006, but Nationwide failed to secure the purchase. Aircraft that were also under consideration for the longhaul routes were the Boeing 747-400 and Boeing 777-200ER. In February 2005, the airline began updating its fleet by introducing its first Boeing 737-500 into service. It thus became the only operator of the -500 type in South Africa.

In March 2008, the airline was awarded as the most punctual scheduled airline in 2007 between London and Johannesburg for the second consecutive year according to the UK Civil Aviation Authority statistics.

In January, Nationwide resumed operations and attained a gradual recovery of the business. However, in the months of March and April they faced a 30% increase in fuel costs coupled with a decrease in passenger load factors. Nationwide's already critical cash-flow meant operations were no longer sustainable without external, third party finance. An effort to sell 51% of the airline that Spring had failed, and as a result management decided to voluntarily cease all flight operations.

By May 2008, liquidation proceedings were already in progress. December 2008 saw the first ever auction of Boeing aircraft in South Africa

== Destinations ==
Nationwide Airlines served the following destinations (at April 2008):

Africa

- South Africa:
  - Cape Town – Cape Town International Airport
  - Durban – Durban International Airport
  - George – George Airport
  - Johannesburg – O.R. Tambo International Airport
  - Kruger Park – Kruger Mpumalanga International Airport
  - Port Elizabeth – Port Elizabeth Airport
- Zambia:
  - Livingstone – Livingstone Airport

Europe

- United Kingdom:
  - London – London Gatwick Airport

== Incidents and accidents ==
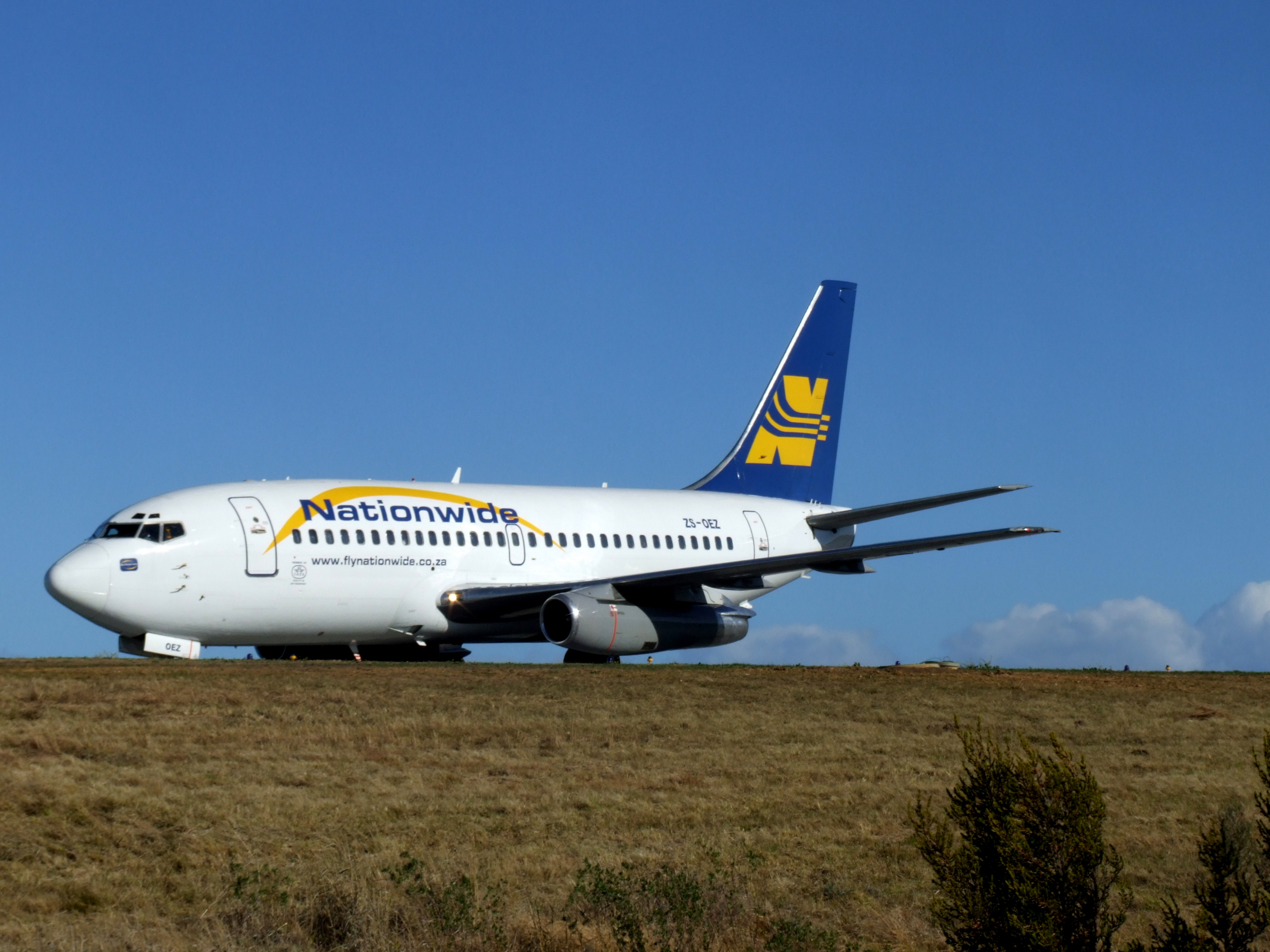
ZS-OEZ, the aircraft involved in the incident, pictured 4 months prior at George Airport.

- 7 November 2007: Nationwide Airlines Flight 723, a 737-200, had its right-hand engine fall off a few seconds after liftoff from Cape Town International Airport en route to OR Tambo International Airport. The official South African Civil Aviation Authority (SACAA) report found that the Nationwide Aircraft Maintenance, the airline's air maintenance organisation had failed to implement the mandated service directive to inspect the rear engine mounting on the 737-200 series aircraft every 700 cycles and that this omission hid the existence of a stress fracture in one of the engine retaining bolts which failed at rotation. This retaining bolt failure put sufficient strain on the engine pylon that it completely detached from the wing (to prevent wing damage) while the pilots performed an emergency one-engine climb. The engine fell onto the runway, causing the airport to close and various other aircraft to be diverted to George Airport. During the accident, the aircraft also lost most of its 'A' system hydraulic fluid (and a substantial quantity of fuel from the right wing tank) via the now severed connections between the fuel and hydraulic system and the right engine. This kind of separation, and severance of the lines had been anticipated by Boeing engineers, but due to the nature of the separation, the break in the lines occurred deeper into the wing than the pre-planned breaking point. Amongst other failures, this also degraded the wheel brakes, and the nose wheel steering would not function. The undercarriage would also not extend normally and had to be lowered manually. Back at Cape Town, the detached engine remained to the east of the runway, and was only moved after an initial inspection by the accident investigators. Captain Trevor Arnold and First Officer Daniel Perry were in command of this flight, numbered CE723. Daniel Perry was the pilot flying at the time of the accident. No one was injured.

Captain Trevor Arnold was subsequently honoured through the receipt of the international Polaris Award for his airmanship and the handling of the emergency.

=== Grounded ===
- 29 November 2007: The existence of a pre-existing stress fracture in the engine retaining bolt (caused by mechanic error due to overtightening) and the lack of documentation showing compliance by Nationwide's Approved Maintenance Organization (AMO) with the engine bolt inspection airworthiness directive for a period of more than 3 years prior to the accident led the SACAA to ground all Nationwide aircraft for non-compliance with the applicable Civil Aviation regulations. The official SACAA report further highlighted that the airline's service organisation was not in possession of a certificate to operate for a month prior to and at the time of the accident. Numerous points of compliance raised by safety inspectors had remained open despite repeated inspections and audits during a period of some years hence the lack of a certificate to operate for the Nationwide Air Maintenance organisation at the time of the accident to CE723.

The airline had 30 days to either comply with the regulations or appeal.

- 7 December 2007: The SACAA granted the 767-300ER permission to fly on their Johannesburg to London route due to the fact that that aircraft was not maintained by Nationwide Aircraft Maintenance but by a European Airline's AMO. The airline had planned to resume domestic flights the following week.
- 24 December 2007: Nationwide aircraft had been granted permission to resume operations, but the airline had lost most of its holiday season passengers during the shut down and were operating with a reduced fleet size. According to Rodger Whittle, Nationwide's corporate quality director, the airline struggled to accommodate the remaining holiday season traffic and revenue were under stress.

== Fleet ==
The Nationwide Airlines fleet consisted of the following aircraft (at April 2008):

Nationwide fleet
Aircraft	In Fleet	Notes
Boeing 727-200	3	Used mostly for charter and regional routes
Boeing 737-200	11	Used on primary domestic and regional routes
Boeing 737-500	2	Used on primary domestic and regional routes
Boeing 767-300ER	1	Used on Johannesburg-London route
Total	17	
