= Polaris Award =

International civil aviation decoration

The Polaris Award is the highest decoration associated with civil aviation, awarded by the International Federation of Air Line Pilots' Associations (IFALPA) to airline crews in recognition for acts of exceptional airmanship, heroic action or a combination of these two attributes. In extraordinary cases, passengers may also obtain this award for their heroism. These awards are not made every year, but are presented at IFALPA's annual conference.

== Past awards ==
Year	Captain	First Officer	Other flight crew	Incident	Circumstances
1983	Mr Donald W Usher	Mr Melvin E Windsor	Unknown	Air Florida Flight 90	Rescue helicopter crew
1984	Captain Donald S Cameron	FO Claude Ouimet	Unknown	Air Canada Flight 797	Cabin fire
1985	Captain J Gibson	FO G Lintner	FE G Laurin	Reeve Aleutian Airways Flight 8	L188 Electra propeller loss, and flight controls jammed
1986	Captain Hani Galal	FO Imad Mounib	Unknown	EgyptAir Flight 648	Hijack
1987	Captain M Takahama	FO Y Sasaki	FE H Fukuda	Japan Air Lines Flight 123	Decompression and loss of control
1989	Captain R L Schornstheimer	FO M L Tompkins	Unknown	Aloha Airlines Flight 243	Explosive decompression
1990	Captain Alfred C Haynes	FO William Records	FE Dudley Dvorak, Captain Dennis E Fitch	United Airlines Flight 232	Uncontained engine failure, total hydraulics and control failure
1991	Captain Anatoly Grischenko			Chernobyl disaster	Helicopter pilot who hovered over the reactor to allow cement to be dropped onto it
1992	Captain Stefan G. Rasmussen	FO Ulf Cedermark		Scandinavian Airlines Flight 751	Dual engine failure after takeoff
1992	FO Alastair Atchison			British Airways Flight 5390	Windscreen failure
1992	Captain W C Query	FO Q E Haynes		Atlantic Southeast Airlines Flight 2254	Mid-air collision
1993	Captain C Justiniano				Hijack, two successful forced landings
1996	Captain A Faria e Mello				Paraplegic, wheelchair pilot
1996	Captain B Dhellemme	FO Jean-Paul Borderie	FE Alain Bossuat	Air France Flight 8969	Hijack
1998	Captain L Abate	Mr M Mekuria		Ethiopian Airlines Flight 961	Hijack, ditching
1999	Captain U Khan	FO M F Querishi			Hijack
2000	Captain N Nagashima	FO Ka Koga		All Nippon Airways Flight 61	Hijack
2000	Captain J Yamauchi				
2000	Captain T Higuchi				
2000	Captain H Takagi				
2000	Captain H Nishikata				
2000	Captain Y Iwai	Mr D Sugama			
2001	Captain William Hagan	FO Richard Webb	FO Phil Watson	British Airways Flight 2069	BA 2069, attempted hijack by a paranoia panic attacked person
2001	Captain Jason M Dahl	FO LeRoy Homer Jr.		United Airlines Flight 93	9/11 attacks
2001	Captain Victor Saracini	FO Michael Horrocks		United Airlines Flight 175	9/11 attacks
2001	Captain John Ogonowski	FO Thomas McGuinness Jr.		American Airlines Flight 11	9/11 attacks
2001	Captain Charles Burlingame	FO David Charlesbois		American Airlines Flight 77	9/11 attacks
2005	Captain Eric Gennotte	FO Steeve Michielsen	FE Mario Rofail	2003 Baghdad DHL attempted shootdown incident	Loss of all hydraulics and controls
2005	Captain I Lyngmo	FO K M Andresen		Kato Air Flight 603	Lightning strike, elevator control failure
2005	Captain S M Lian	FO K M Andresen	Mr Odd Eriksen, Mr T Frantzen	Kato Air Flight 605	Attempted hijack
2005	Captain J Kurka	FO M Turk		Austrian Airlines	Fokker 70 dual engine failure
2008	Captain T Arnold			Nationwide Airlines Flight 723	Engine separated from aircraft
2009	Captain D McMillan	FO R Haverfield		Eagle Airways Flight 2279	Attempted hijack
2010	Captain J Bartels	FO B Werninghaus	SO P Tabac	Qantas Flight 30	Oxygen bottle explosion, rapid depressurisation
2011	Captain Richard Champion de Crespigny	FO M Hicks	SO M Johnson, Captain H Wubben, Captain David Evans	Qantas Flight 32	Uncontained engine failure
2014	Captain Malcolm Waters	FO David Hayhoe		Cathay Pacific Flight 780	Contaminated fuel leading to engine stuck at high thrust setting
2017	Carlos Ferreira, Philip Andre	David Abad	Antonio López-Cerón, Brian Chouza, Daniel Fernández.	Rescues of crews of MV Modern Express and Gure Uxua	Helicopter rescues of shipwrecked crews.

== See also ==
- List of aviation awards
