= British Airways Flight 5390 =

1990 aviation accident over England

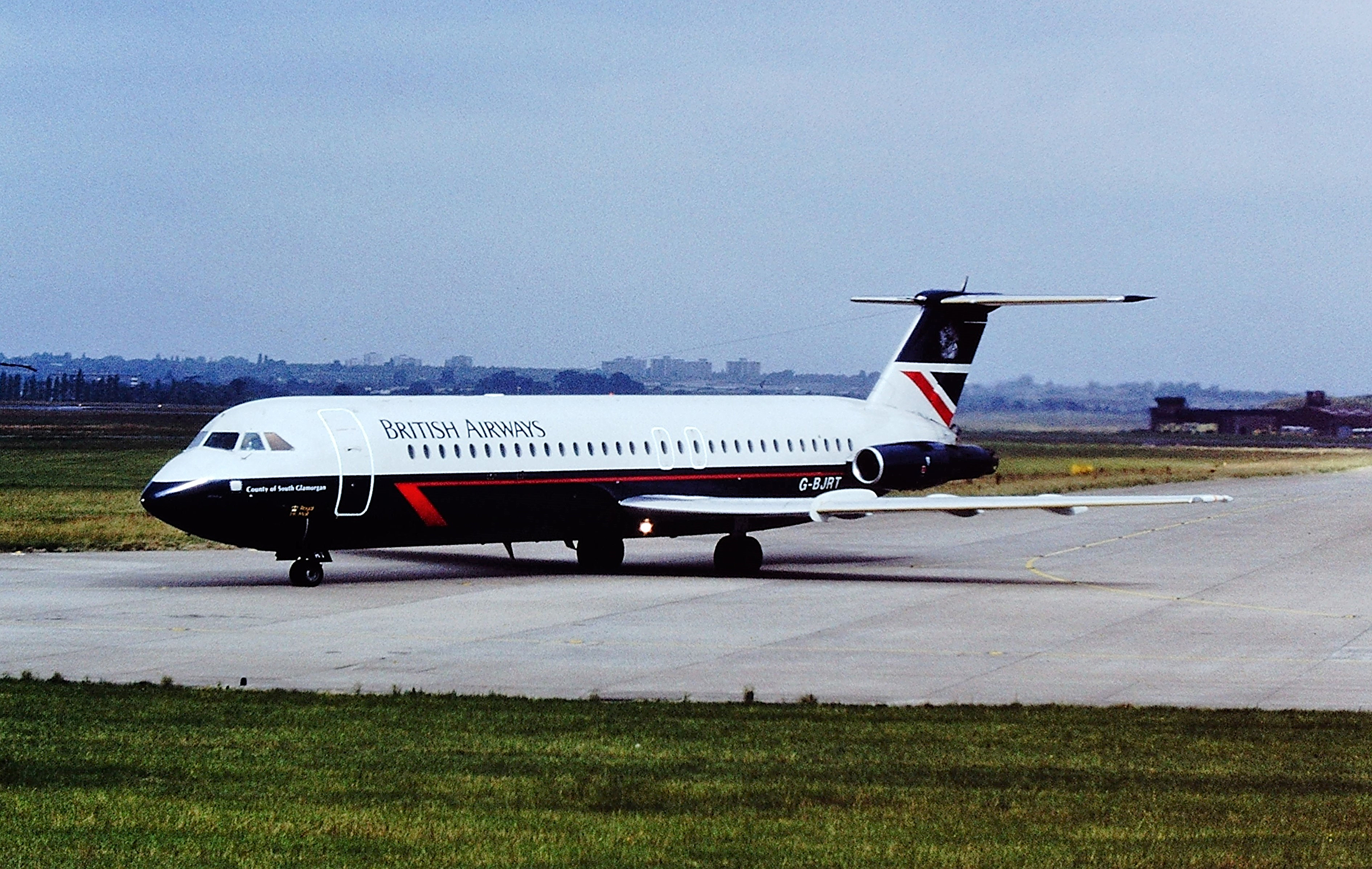
- G-BJRT, the aircraft involved in the accident, pictured in 1989

Accident
- Date: 10 June 1990
- Summary: Explosive decompression of cockpit window due to poor maintenance procedures
- Site: Didcot, England, United Kingdom; 51°36′21″N 1°14′27″W

Aircraft
- Aircraft type: BAC One-Eleven 528FL
- Aircraft name: County of South Glamorgan
- Operator: British Airways
- IATA flight No.: BA5390
- ICAO flight No.: BAW5390
- Call sign: SPEEDBIRD 5390
- Registration: G-BJRT
- Flight origin: Birmingham Airport, United Kingdom
- Destination: Málaga Airport, Spain
- Occupants: 87
- Passengers: 81
- Crew: 6
- Fatalities: 0
- Injuries: 2
- Survivors: 87

British Airways Flight 5390 was a scheduled international passenger flight from Birmingham Airport in England to Málaga Airport in Spain. On 10 June 1990, the BAC One-Eleven suffered an explosive decompression. While the aircraft was flying over Didcot, England, an improperly installed windscreen panel separated from its frame, causing the captain to be partially ejected from the aircraft. He was held in place through the window frame for 20 minutes until the first officer landed at Southampton Airport.

== Background ==
=== Aircraft ===
The County of South Glamorgan was a BAC One-Eleven Series 528FL jet airliner built in 1971 and was registered as G-BJRT.

=== Crew ===
The captain was 42-year-old Timothy Lancaster, who had logged 11,050 flight hours, including 1,075 hours on the BAC One-Eleven; the co-pilot was 39-year-old Alastair Aitchison, with 7,500 flight hours, with 1,100 of them on the BAC One-Eleven. The aircraft also carried 4 cabin crew and 81 passengers.

== Accident ==
Aitchison handled a routine take-off at 08:20 local time (07:20 UTC), then handed control to Lancaster as the plane continued to climb. Both pilots released their shoulder harnesses and Lancaster loosened his lap belt. At 08:33 (07:33 UTC), the plane had climbed through about 17,300 feet (5,300 m) over Didcot, and the cabin crew were preparing for meal service.

Flight attendant Nigel Ogden was entering the cockpit when a loud bang occurred and the cabin quickly filled with condensation. The left windscreen panel, on Lancaster's side of the flight deck, had separated from the forward fuselage; Lancaster was propelled out of his seat by the rushing air from the decompression and forced headfirst out of the flight deck. His knees were caught on the flight controls and his upper body remained outside the aircraft. Lancaster’s shirt was torn off by the force of the decompression, leaving his torso completely exposed to the extreme wind and cold. The autopilot disengaged, causing the plane to descend rapidly. The flight deck door was blown inward onto the control console, blocking the throttle control (causing the aircraft to gain speed as it descended), flight documents and check lists were blown out of the cockpit, and debris blew in from the passenger cabin. Ogden rushed to grab Lancaster's belt, while the other two flight attendants secured loose objects, reassured passengers, and instructed them to adopt brace positions in anticipation of an emergency landing.

The plane was not equipped with oxygen for everyone on board, so Aitchison began a rapid emergency descent to reach an altitude with sufficient air pressure. He then re-engaged the autopilot and broadcast a distress call, but he was unable to hear the response from air traffic control (ATC) because of wind noise; the difficulty in establishing two-way communication led to a delay in initiation of emergency procedures. Ogden, still holding onto Lancaster, was by now becoming exhausted, so Chief Steward John Heward and flight attendant Simon Rogers took over the task of holding on to the captain. By this time, Lancaster had shifted several centimetres further outside and his head was repeatedly striking the side of the fuselage. The crew believed him to be dead, but Aitchison told the others to continue holding onto him, out of fear that letting go of him might cause him to strike the left wing, engine, or horizontal stabiliser, potentially damaging it.

Eventually, Aitchison was able to hear the clearance from ATC to make an emergency landing at Southampton Airport. The flight attendants managed to free Lancaster's ankles from the flight controls while still keeping hold of him. At 08:55 local time (07:55 UTC), the aircraft landed at Southampton and the passengers disembarked using boarding steps.

Lancaster survived with frostbite, bruising, shock, and fractures to his right arm, left thumb, and right wrist. Ogden had frostbite in his face, a dislocated shoulder, and later suffered from post-traumatic stress disorder. There were no other injuries.

== Investigation ==
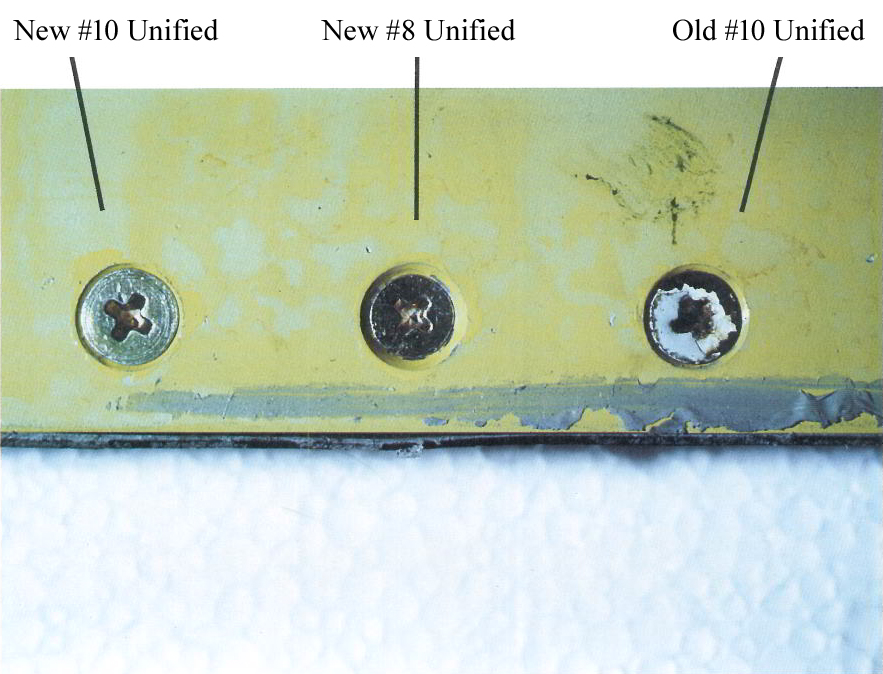
Comparison of screws used in the G-BJRT windscreen (left to right: correct size, new; small size, new; correct size, old)

Police located the blown-off windscreen panel and many of the 90 screws used to secure it near Cholsey. Investigators determined that when the windscreen was installed 27 hours before the flight, 84 of the screws used were 0.026 inches (0.66 mm) too small in diameter (British Standards A211-8C vs A211-8D, which are #8–32 vs #10–32 by the Unified Thread Standard) and the remaining six were A211-7D, which is the correct diameter, but 0.1 inches (2.5 mm) too short (0.7 inch vs. 0.8 inch). The previous windscreen had also been fitted using incorrect screws, which were replaced by the shift maintenance manager on a like-for-like basis without reference to maintenance documentation, as the plane was due to depart shortly. The undersized screws were unable to withstand the force due to the air pressure difference between the cabin and the outside atmosphere during flight. (The windscreen was not of the "plug" type – fitted from the inside so that cabin pressure helps to hold it in place, but of the type fitted from the outside so that cabin pressure tends to dislodge it.)

Investigators from the Air Accidents Investigation Branch found that the shift maintenance manager responsible for installing the incorrect screws had failed to follow British Airways policies. They recommended that staff with prescription glasses should be required to wear them when undertaking maintenance tasks. They also faulted the policies themselves, which should have required testing or verification by another individual for this critical task. Finally, they found the local Birmingham Airport management responsible for not directly monitoring the shift maintenance manager's working practices.

== Awards ==
First Officer Alastair Aitchison and cabin crew members Susan Gibbins and Nigel Ogden were awarded the Queen's Commendation for Valuable Service in the Air; Ogden's name was omitted from the published supplement. Aitchison was also awarded a 1992 Polaris Award for outstanding airmanship.

== Aftermath ==
Lancaster returned to work after fewer than five months. He left British Airways in 2003 and flew with EasyJet until he retired from commercial piloting in 2008.

Aitchison left British Airways shortly after the accident and joined Channel Express (later rebranded as Jet2) until he made his last commercial flight on a Boeing 737-33A from Alicante to Manchester on the day of his 65th birthday on 28 June 2015.

Ogden returned to work, but subsequently suffered from PTSD and retired in 2001 on the grounds of ill health. As of 2005, he was working as a night watchman at a Salvation Army hospital.

== See also ==
- Sichuan Airlines Flight 8633 (2018) had a similar accident in which the first officer survived being partially blown out of the cockpit following a failure of the windshield of the Airbus A319 operating the flight
- Southwest Airlines Flight 1380 (2018) had an explosive decompression accident following an uncontained engine failure that resulted in a passenger being partially blown out of a window; the passenger later died from her injuries.
