= Cathay Pacific Flight 780 =

2010 aircraft accident in Hong Kong

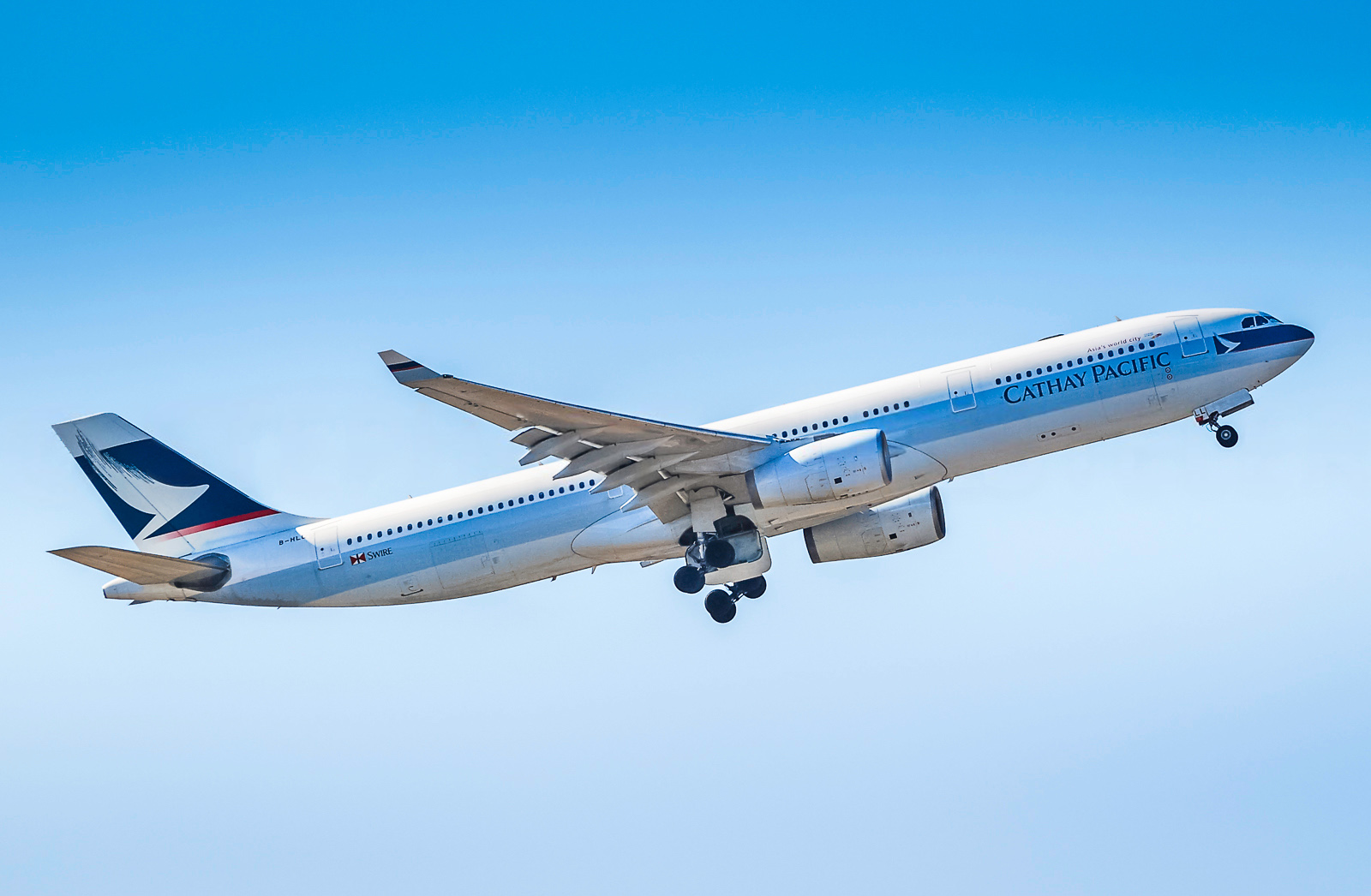
- B-HLL, the aircraft involved in the accident, photographed in 2009

Accident
- Date: 13 April 2010
- Summary: Engine failure due to fuel contamination
- Site: Hong Kong International Airport, after landing on runway 07L; 22°18′32″N 113°54′52″E

Aircraft
- Aircraft type: Airbus A330-342
- Operator: Cathay Pacific
- IATA flight No.: CX780
- ICAO flight No.: CPA780
- Call sign: CATHAY 780
- Registration: B-HLL
- Flight origin: Juanda International Airport, Surabaya, East Java, Indonesia
- Destination: Hong Kong International Airport, New Territories, Hong Kong
- Occupants: 322
- Passengers: 309
- Crew: 13
- Fatalities: 0
- Injuries: 63
- Survivors: 322

Cathay Pacific Flight 780 was an international passenger flight operated by Cathay Pacific which made a high speed landing on 13 April 2010 due to engine failure, while flying from Juanda International Airport in Surabaya, Indonesia to Hong Kong International Airport. As the Airbus A330 neared Hong Kong, the flight crew were unable to change the thrust output of engine one, forcing a landing at almost twice the normal speed. The aircraft sustained minor damages and all 322 people on board survived, with 57 passengers and six crew members injured in the ensuing evacuation, including one severe injury. The incident was caused by contamination of the fuel taken on board at Surabaya, which gradually damaged both of the aircraft's engines.

The flight's two Australian pilots, Captain Malcolm Waters and First Officer David Hayhoe, who safely landed the aircraft despite the extraordinary challenge, have been compared to pilots Chesley Sullenberger and Jeffrey Skiles of US Airways Flight 1549 the previous year (January 2009). In March 2014, the two Flight 780 pilots were awarded the Polaris Award by the International Federation of Air Line Pilots' Associations for their heroism and airmanship.

== Background ==
=== Aircraft ===
The aircraft involved was an Airbus A330-342, registered as B-HLL with serial number 244, fitted with two Rolls-Royce Trent 772-60 engines. It first flew on 4 November 1998 and was delivered to Cathay Pacific three weeks later on 25 November. This aircraft was configured for a capacity of 311 passengers and 13 crew, with 44 business-class seats and 267 economy-class seats.

After the Flight 780 incident, the aircraft was bought by DVB Bank in July 2011 and was transferred to Dragonair on 23 April 2012. It was reconfigured for a capacity of 307 passengers, with 42 business-class seats and 265 economy-class seats following the aircraft transfer to Dragonair. It was involved in another incident six years later as Flight KA691 from Hong Kong to Penang on 8 September 2016, with 295 passengers and crew on board, when an airport delivery van crashed into the aircraft's left engine. Following Cathay Pacific's takeover of Dragonair, the aircraft was repainted into the new Cathay Dragon livery on 3 November 2017.

The aircraft was withdrawn from service on 13 August 2020, at the expiration of its lease, after its last commercial flight from Beijing to Hong Kong as KA993. The aircraft's final flight was on 14 October 2020, to Pinal Airpark in Marana, Arizona, via Anchorage as KA3496. The aircraft was scrapped on site in November 2021.

=== Crew ===
The flight involved 13 crew members, including 11 cabin crew and two Australian pilots – Captain Malcolm Waters (35) and First Officer David Hayhoe (37). Waters had been working for Cathay Pacific for 12 years and had logged 7,756 total flight hours, including 2,601 flight hours on the Airbus A330. Hayhoe had been working for Cathay Pacific for 3 years, previously serving the Royal Australian Air Force for 11 years, and had logged 4,050 total flight hours, including 1,171 flight hours on the Airbus A330.

== Accident ==
Cathay Pacific Flight 780 departed from stand 8 at Juanda International Airport in Indonesia. It took off from runway 28 at 08:24 local time (01:24 UTC). During the climb, both engines experienced small engine pressure ratio fluctuations, with the No. 2 engine fluctuating over a greater range than the No. 1 engine. Just over half an hour after takeoff, cruising at flight level 390 (about 39,000 ft (12,000 m) above sea level), the electronic centralized aircraft monitoring (ECAM) system displayed an "ENG 2 CTL SYS FAULT" error message. The crew contacted maintenance control to discuss the fluctuations. As other engine operating parameters on both engines were normal, continuing the flight was determined to be safe.

Almost two hours after departure, at 03:16 UTC, the "ENG 2 CTL SYS FAULT" ECAM message reappeared. The crew contacted maintenance control to review the issue. As all other engine parameters remained normal, continuing on to Hong Kong was again deemed safe.

After another two hours elapsed, the aircraft was on descent to Hong Kong when, at 05:19 UTC, about 203 kilometres (126 mi; 110 nmi) southeast of Hong Kong International Airport, the aircraft's ECAM displayed "ENG 1 CTL SYS FAULT" and "ENG 2 STALL" within a short period. The second message signified an engine compressor stall, a potentially serious engine problem. The flight crew accordingly carried out the necessary ECAM actions with No. 2 engine's thrust lever moved to the idle (or minimum-thrust setting) position. The crew set No. 1 engine to maximum continuous thrust to compensate for the low thrust of No. 2 engine. Following these actions, the crew declared a "pan-pan" with Hong Kong air traffic control, requesting the shortest possible route to the airport and priority landing.

A few minutes later, about 83 km (52 mi; 45 nmi) southeast of Hong Kong International Airport, the aircraft was in a descent and approaching an altitude of 8,000 ft (2,438 m) when an "ENG 1 STALL" ECAM message appeared. The flight crew carried out the actions for a No. 1 engine compressor stall and declared a "mayday". The captain then moved the thrust levers to test engine responses. No. 1 engine's rotational fan speed slowly spooled up to about 74% N_{1}, while No. 2 engine remained running below idle speed, about 17% N_{1}, the former providing sufficient thrust to level off at 5,500 feet (1,700 m) and reach Hong Kong. As the flight approached the airport, the crew found that movement of the thrust levers failed to reduce thrust below 74% N_{1} on No. 1 engine.

At 13:43 hours local time (05:43 UTC), 11 minutes after declaring the "mayday", the aircraft touched down hard on runway 07L (length 3800 m; 12,470 ft) at a groundspeed of 426 km/h (265 mph; 230 kn), 176 km/h (109 mph; 95 kn) over the normal touchdown speed for an A330 and above both the maximum allowable flap-extension speed and the speed rating of the tyres. The plane bounced and briefly became airborne again until it slammed down hard while banking left, causing the left engine to scrape against the runway surface. Both wing spoilers deployed automatically. Only the No. 1 engine's thrust reverser deployed and activated with the right engine's thrust reverser made unresponsive by a technical snag, forcing the crew to bring the aircraft to a stop using manual braking. The No. 1 engine remained between 70% and 80% N_{1} until the crew shut down both engines upon coming to a stop.

Five of the aircraft's eight main wheel tires deflated. Airport firefighters reported that smoke and flames were emanating from the landing gear. The captain ordered an emergency evacuation, during which 57 passengers were injured, of whom 10 were transported to hospital.

== Investigations ==
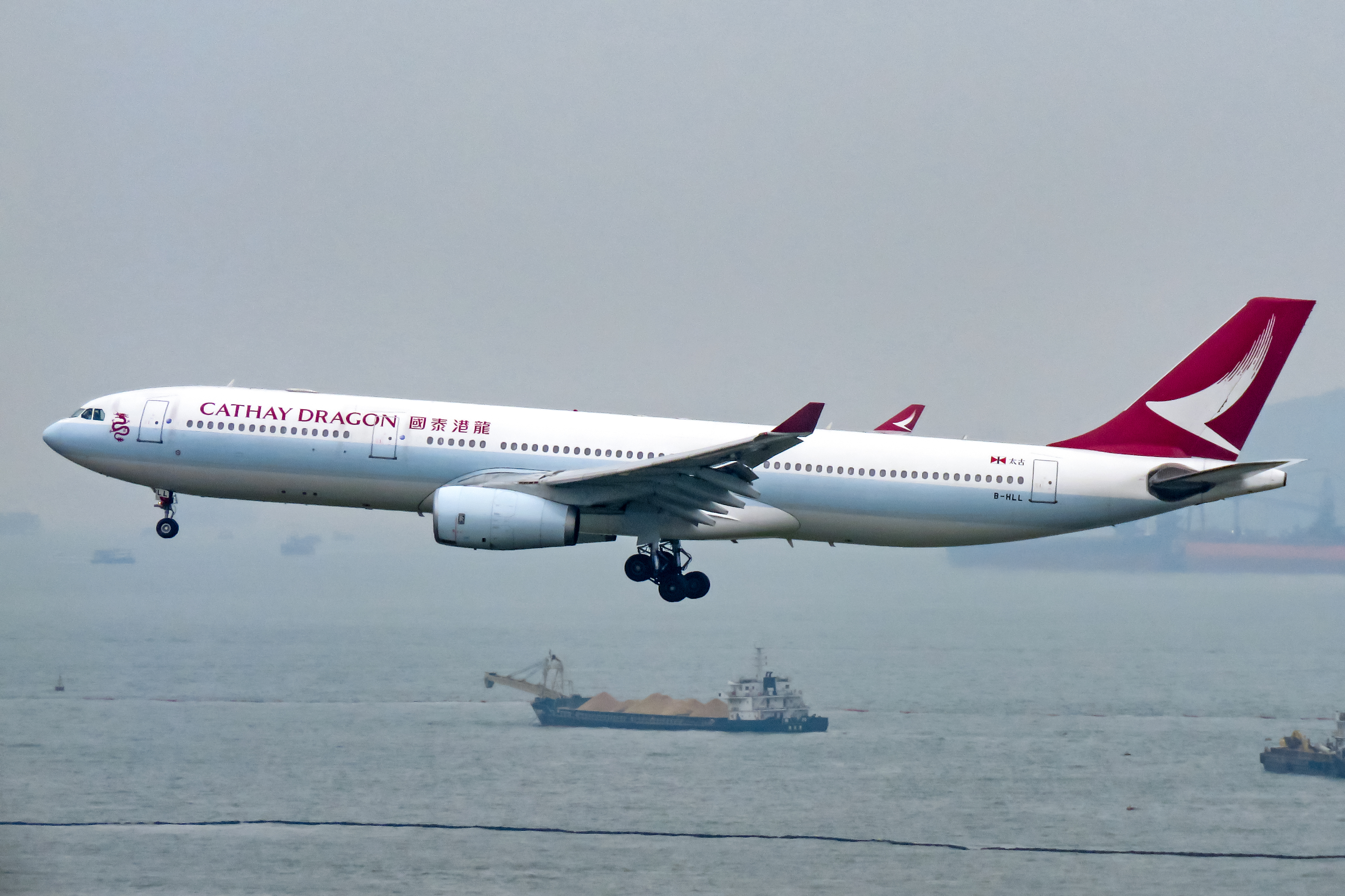
B-HLL in 2019, under its final operator, Cathay Dragon

Investigators from the Hong Kong Civil Aviation Department, the French Bureau of Enquiry and Analysis for Civil Aviation Safety, and the British Air Accidents Investigation Branch formed a team to investigate the accident. The National Transportation Safety Committee of Indonesia and the National Transportation Safety Board of the United States were also involved in the investigation, as were representatives of Airbus, Rolls-Royce and Cathay Pacific.

Data from the digital flight data recorder, cockpit voice recorder, and quick access recorder were downloaded for analysis. The investigation concentrated on the engines, the engine control systems and the fuel system.

Analysis of the engines found that their fuel systems were contaminated with spherical particles. The Hong Kong Civil Aviation Department's Accident Investigation Division concluded that the accident was caused by these spherical particles. The contaminated fuel, which contained particles of superabsorbent polymer (SAP) introduced into the fuel system when the aircraft was fueled at Surabaya, subsequently caused the loss of thrust control on both engines of the aircraft during approach to Hong Kong.

The polymer particles, a component of the filter monitors installed in a fueling dispenser at Juanda Airport, had caused the main metering valves of the fuel metering unit to seize. The valves were found to be stuck in positions corresponding to the recorded thrust output of each engine as it approached Hong Kong. Other engine components were found to be contaminated with the particles, while the variable stator vane controller of engine No. 2 was found to be seized. The entire fuel system, including the fuel tanks, was found to be contaminated with spherical particles.

Fuel samples collected at Juanda International Airport were contaminated with the particles. The fuel supply pipeline system used to refuel aircraft at Juanda International Airport had been recently extended during construction of new aircraft parking bays. The investigation discovered that not all procedures had been followed when the system was brought back into service, and that salt water had entered the fuel supply. The presence of salt water compromised the filter monitors in the pipeline system, releasing the SAP particles into the fuel.

== Dramatisation ==
The accident was featured in the first episode of season 19 of the Canadian TV series Mayday labelled "Deadly Descent".

== See also ==
- British Airways Flight 38, a Boeing 777 that lost engine power shortly before a 2008 crash-landing at London Heathrow Airport
- Air Transat Flight 236, an Airbus A330-200 that had fuel starvation before landing safely at Lajes Air Base in the Azores
- British Airways Flight 009, a Boeing 747-200 that lost power on all four engines after flying through a cloud of volcanic ash
- Qantas Flight 72, an Airbus A330-300 accident over the Indian Ocean, where a flight control system malfunction caused injuries to passengers and crew
