= Gottröra Church =

Church building in Norrtälje Municipality, Sweden

Coordinates: 59°44′25″N 18°09′29″E

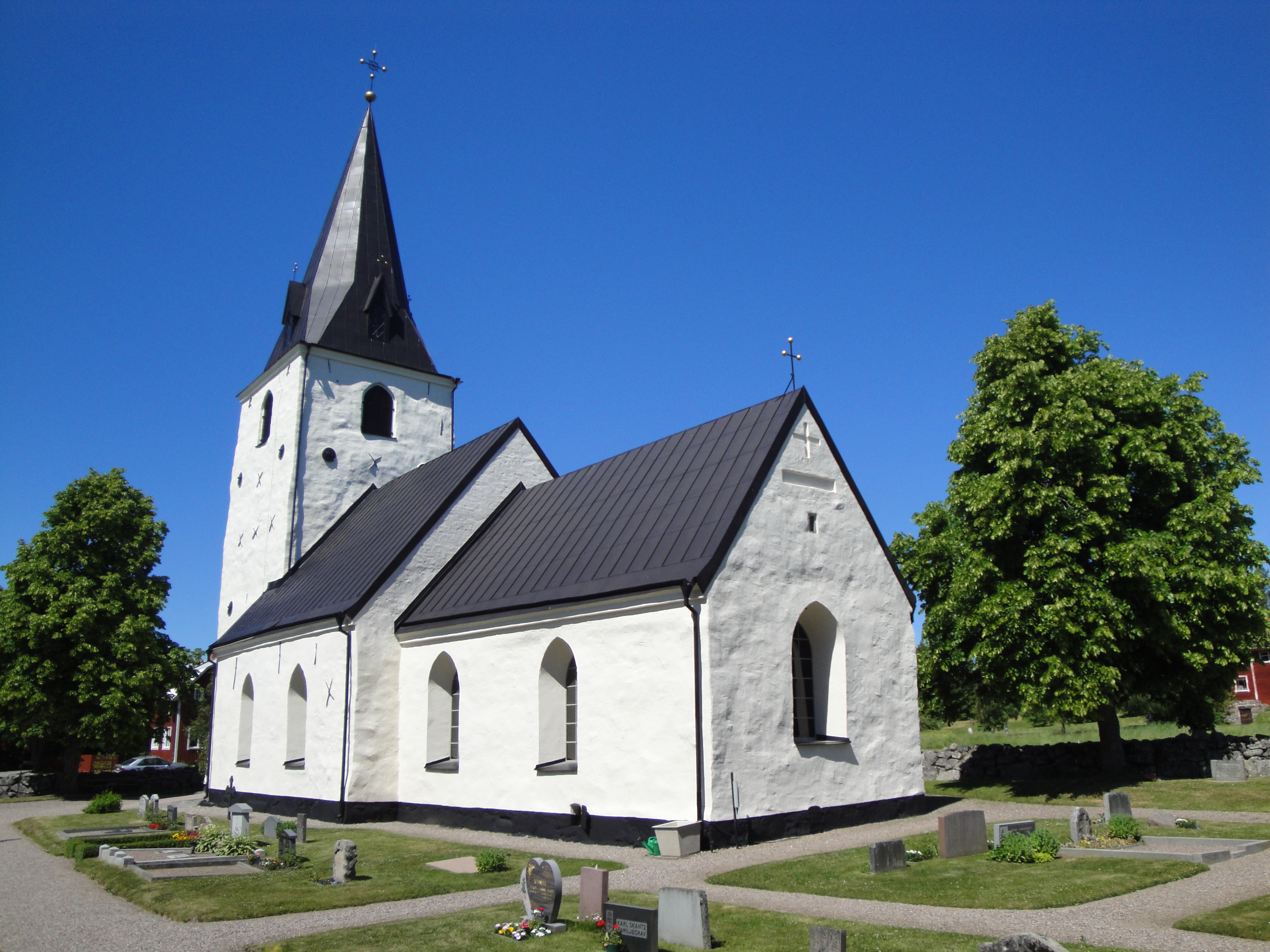
Gottröra Church

Gottröra Church is a church in the village of Gottröra in Norrtälje Municipality, Sweden. The church was originally raised in the 12th century, and has been rebuilt several times.
