= Clarke Bynum =

American basketball player

Personal information
- Born: November 13, 1961
- Died: September 3, 2007 (aged 45) Sumter, South Carolina, US
- Listed height: 6 ft 7 in (2.01 m)

Career information
- High school: Wilson Hall (Sumter, South Carolina)
- College: Clemson (1980–1984)
- NBA draft: 1984: undrafted
- Position: Forward

Career highlights
- Second-team Parade All-American (1980); McDonald's All-American (1980)

Henry Clarke Bynum Jr. (November 13, 1961 – September 3, 2007) was an American basketball player for the Clemson Tigers who helped to stop a plane hijacking in 2000.

A McDonald's All-American at Wilson Hall in Sumter, South Carolina, Bynum played for the Clemson Tigers at Clemson University from 1980 to 1984. He was 6 foot 7 inches tall. He averaged five points and two rebounds during his four seasons with the Tigers. Bynum was an All-Academic in the Atlantic Coast Conference during his senior year. Bynum took a job with his family's insurance business following his graduation from Clemson. He later served as chairman of his high school alma mater, Wilson Hall. He remains Wilson Hall's school's all-time basketball scoring leader.

Bynum is best known for subduing a passenger who broke into the cockpit of British Airways Flight 2069 with 398 passengers in December 2000. The passenger had attacked the plane's pilot and grabbed the controls, sending the plane into two nose-dives. Bynum and several other passengers managed to break into the cockpit and restrained the man until the plane could land.

Bynum received the Order of the Palmetto, South Carolina's highest honor, for his bravery in subduing the man with the help of other passengers. He was also awarded a presidential commendation by Clemson University in 2001.

Clarke Bynum died on September 3, 2007, in Sumter, South Carolina, at the age of 45, from cancer.
