= British Airways Flight 2069 =

2000 aircraft hijacking over Sudan

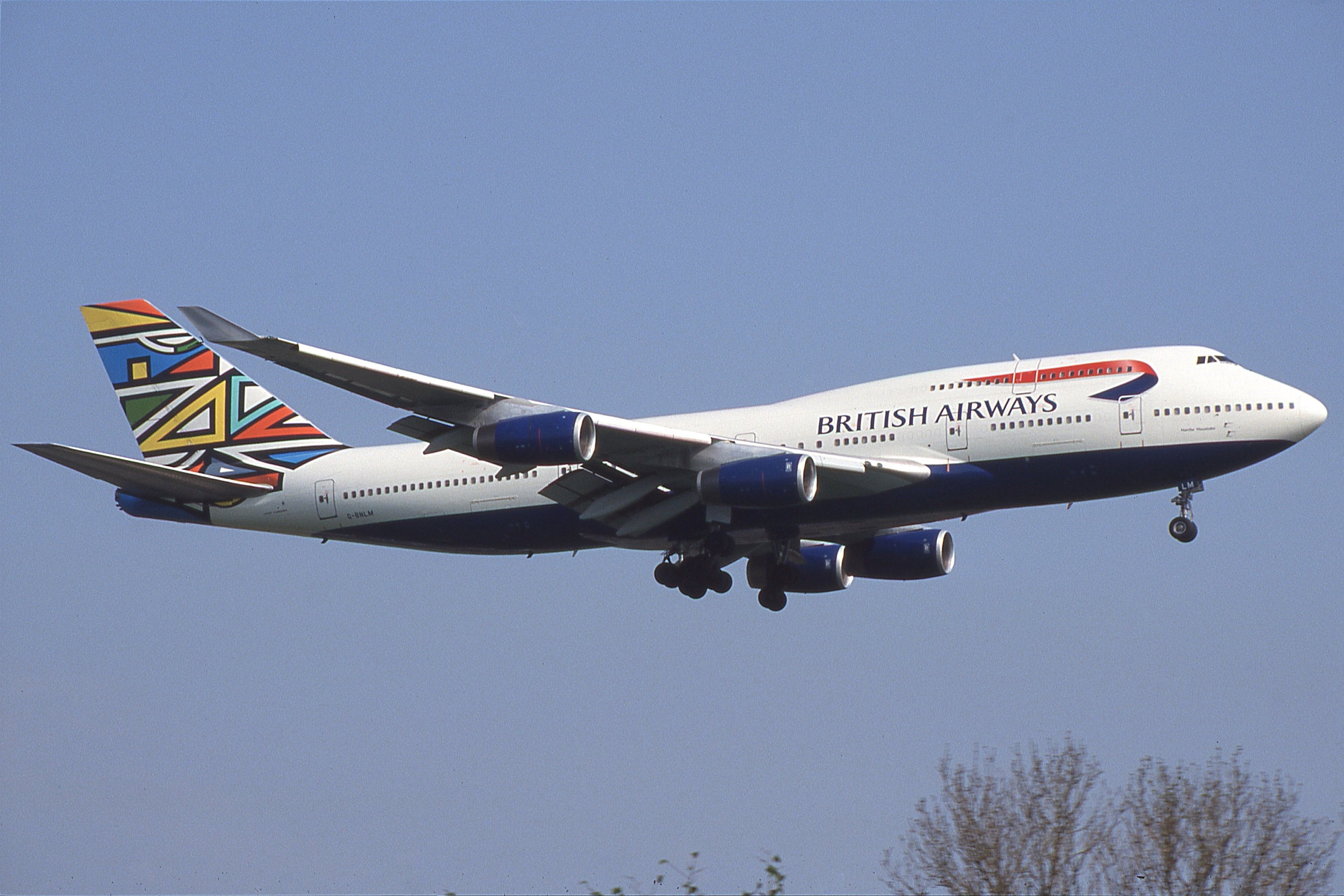
- G-BNLM, the aircraft involved in the hijacking, seen in May 2000

Hijacking
- Date: 29 December 2000
- Summary: Attempted suicide, hijacking
- Site: Over Sudan

Aircraft
- Aircraft type: Boeing 747-436
- Aircraft name: Martha Masanabo
- Operator: British Airways
- IATA flight No.: BA2069
- ICAO flight No.: BAW2069
- Call sign: SPEEDBIRD 2069
- Registration: G-BNLM
- Flight origin: Gatwick Airport, United Kingdom
- Destination: Jomo Kenyatta International Airport, Nairobi, Kenya
- Occupants: 398 (including hijacker)
- Passengers: 379 (including hijacker)
- Crew: 19
- Fatalities: 0
- Injuries: 5
- Survivors: 398 (including hijacker)

British Airways Flight 2069 was a scheduled passenger flight operated by British Airways between Gatwick Airport, England and Jomo Kenyatta Airport, Nairobi, Kenya. At 05:00 on 29 December 2000, a mentally ill passenger stormed the cockpit and attempted to hijack the aircraft. The Boeing 747-400 stalled in the struggle. Captain William Hagan and his crew were able to apprehend the assailant while first officer Phil Watson regained control of the aircraft, bringing the situation under control.

== Aircraft ==
The aircraft involved was a Boeing 747-436, wearing the British Airways Ndebele Martha ethnic livery, (Note: The aircraft was a Boeing 747-400 model; at the time the aircraft was built, Boeing assigned a unique code for each company that bought one of its aircraft, which was applied as a suffix to the model number at the time the aircraft was built. British Airways' code was "36", hence "747-436" (see List of Boeing customer codes).) It bore the registration G-BNLM, and had been delivered to British Airways on 28 June 1990.

== Incident ==
At around 05:00 local time, the cockpit of a British Airways Boeing 747-400 on a scheduled flight from Gatwick to Jomo Kenyatta Airport was stormed by a mentally unstable Kenyan passenger named Paul Mukonyi. Attacking First Officer Phil Watson over the controls, Mukonyi grabbed the yoke, and tried to take control of the plane and change its direction. This disconnected the autopilot and resulted in a struggle between himself and Watson, causing the aircraft to climb sharply and stall from 42,000 feet (13,000 m), falling towards the ground at 30,000 feet (9,100 m) per minute. As Mukonyi and Watson fought for the controls, the struggle was joined by Captain Hagan who had gone for a rest break just before the attack. Hagan eventually succeeded in removing Mukonyi from the controls. Two passengers (basketball player Clarke Bynum and Gifford Murrell Shaw, both from Sumter, South Carolina, United States), who were sitting in the upper deck, were able to enter the cockpit to assist, despite the extreme manoeuvres, and helped to remove Mukonyi from the cockpit. Two flight attendants also ran into the cockpit to assist them. First Officer Watson was able to regain control, and returned the aircraft to level flight. Afterwards, Captain Hagan made an announcement on the PA to reassure the passengers and the flight continued without further incident. Violent pitch changes during the incident were responsible for minor injuries among four passengers; one of the cabin crew suffered an ankle fracture. After landing in Nairobi, Mukonyi was immediately transferred to the authorities. The actions right after the apprehension were recorded on amateur video by the son of English musician Bryan Ferry, who was a passenger on the flight. It was later found that Mukonyi was in fear of being followed, and was trying to kill those whom he deemed to be a threat, in this case the passengers and crew on the flight.

== Aftermath ==
Captain William Hagan and First Officers Phil Watson and Richard Webb were awarded a Polaris Award in 2001. Hagan was also given the Royal Association for Disability and Rehabilitation (RADAR) People of the Year award.

A group of 16 American passengers settled a multimillion-dollar lawsuit against British Airways. British passengers were offered compensation of £2,000 and a free ticket each. The actual compensation package from BA for British passengers included the cash amount of £2,000, free attendance at a "Fear of Flying" course at Birmingham airport, and a free ticket to anywhere in the world on the BA network. In 2013, another small group of British passengers attempted to bring a lawsuit against BA, but a legal case could not be made and their efforts came to nothing.

Proposals were made to require a keypad entry system for the cockpit door and similar equipment, as well as a review of safety procedures. Nothing came of them until after the September 11 attacks.

== In popular culture ==
Playwright Oli Forsyth, a passenger on the flight, based his 2024 play Brace Brace on his experiences.

A drama documentary in the British TV series Terror at 30,000 Feet (Season 1, Episode 1), featuring interviews with the pilots, crew, and passengers, was made by Raw Cut Productions Ltd for Channel 5, produced by Fiona Turnlock, and aired on 19 July 2024 on Channel 5.

== See also ==
Other similar Boeing 747 hijacking incidents:

- All Nippon Airways Flight 61, a similar unsuccessful hijacking attempt by a passenger in 1999.
- All Nippon Airways Flight 857, a successful hijacking that led to a police standoff.
