= All Nippon Airways Flight 61 =

1999 aircraft hijacking

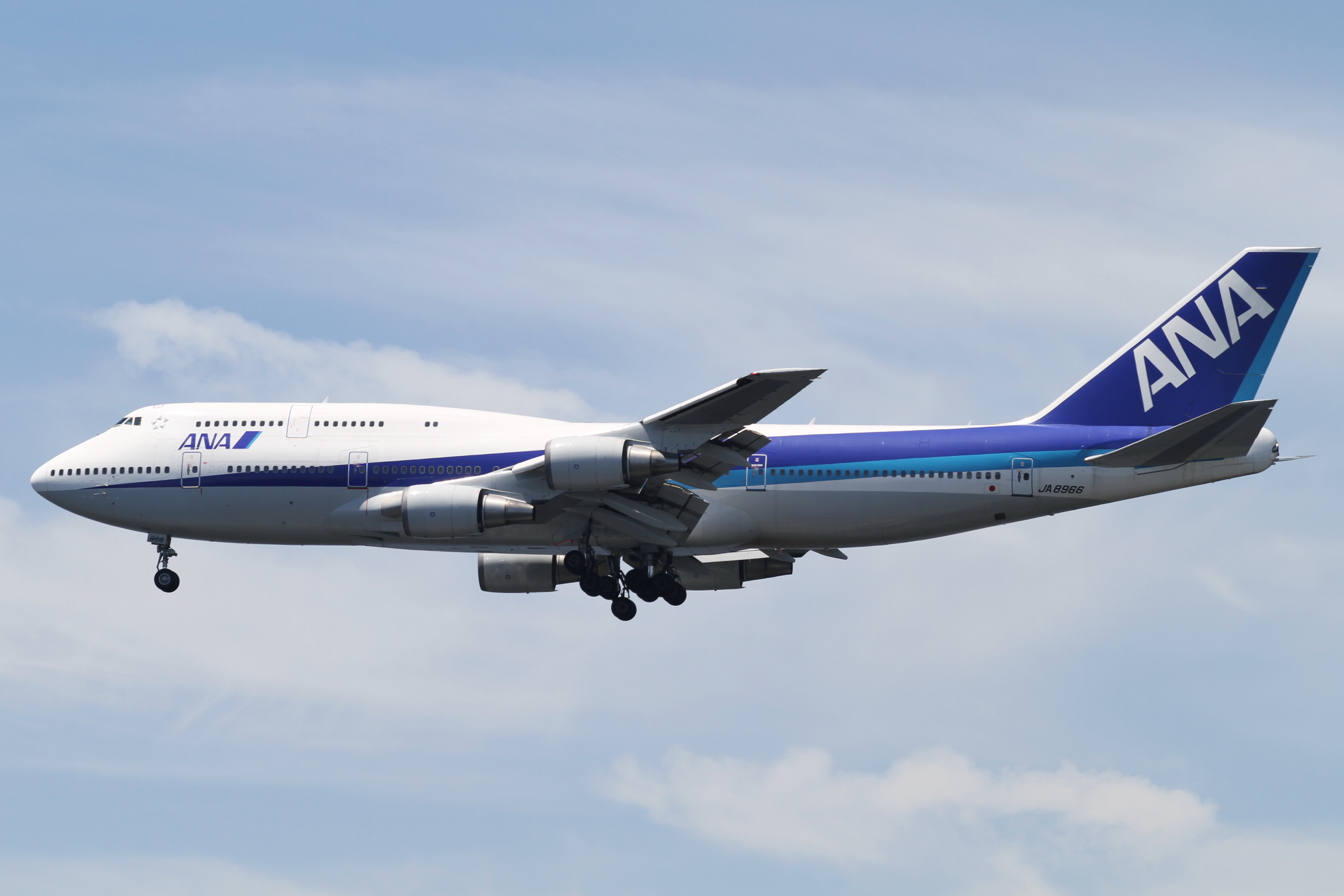
- JA8966, the aircraft in the hijacking attempt, pictured in 2010

Hijacking
- Date: July 23, 1999
- Summary: Hijacking
- Site: Haneda Tokyo, Yokota, Izu Island, Japan; 35.5570°N 139.7813°E

Aircraft
- Aircraft type: Boeing 747-481D
- Operator: All Nippon Airways
- Call sign: ALL NIPPON 61
- Registration: JA8966
- Flight origin: Haneda Airport, Ōta, Tokyo, Japan
- Destination: New Chitose Airport, Chitose, Hokkaido, Japan
- Occupants: 517
- Passengers: 503 (including the hijacker)
- Crew: 14
- Fatalities: 1 (Captain)
- Injuries: 0
- Survivors: 516

All Nippon Airways Flight 61 was a scheduled domestic flight from Tokyo Haneda Airport in Ōta, Tokyo, Japan and was en route to New Chitose Airport in Chitose, Japan, near Sapporo. On 23 July 1999, the Boeing 747-400 operating the flight with 503 passengers on board, including 14 children and 14 crew members on board, was hijacked by Yūji Nishizawa, a Japanese passenger on the flight. (Note: Yuji Nishizawa (西沢 裕司, Nishizawa Yūji))

== Incident ==
About 25 minutes after takeoff at 11:48 A.M. JST, Nishizawa used a kitchen knife which was 20 centimetres (7.9 in) long, to force a flight attendant to allow him access into the cockpit. He then forced 34-year-old First Officer Kazuyuki Koga out, (Note: Kazuyuki Koga (古賀 和幸, Koga Kazuyuki)) remaining in the cockpit with 51-year-old captain Naoyuki Nagashima, (Note: Naoyuki Nagashima (長島 直之, Nagashima Naoyuki)) who managed to notify Air Traffic Control (ATC) about the hijacking. Nishizawa stabbed Nagashima in the chest and took control of the plane, at one point descending to an altitude of 300 metres (980 ft).

At 12:09 P.M. JST, crew members managed to subdue Nishizawa. Off-duty pilot Junji Yamauchi, (Note: Junji Yamauchi (山内 純二, Yamauchi Junji)) who was aboard the flight, took control of the aircraft, and co-pilot Koga got back into the cockpit, telling the air traffic controllers, "It's an emergency. The captain was stabbed. Prepare an ambulance." The plane made an emergency landing at Haneda Airport at 12:14 P.M. and Nishizawa was immediately arrested. A doctor confirmed the death of Nagashima, of Yokohama, shortly after the plane landed. Nishizawa was charged with murder.

== Security exploit ==
Nishizawa had smuggled the knife aboard the aircraft by exploiting multiple security flaws at Haneda. He had discovered that it was possible to access the departure gates from the luggage claim area without going through security checks. He first checked-in for a JAL round-trip flight from Tokyo to Osaka with the knife in his checked baggage while also checking in for Flight 61; upon return to Tokyo he retrieved his baggage (with the knife) from the Osaka flight, and carried the knife (and the bag) aboard Flight 61 as carry-on luggage.

He had originally planned to carry out the hijacking one day earlier, on July 22. He had told his parents and psychiatrist that he was traveling alone to Hokkaido, but his parents had discovered his bags containing multiple airline tickets and the knife, causing him to delay his plans for one day. Nishizawa had booked tickets on multiple departing flights: in addition to Flight 61 for New Chitose, he had tickets for ANA Flight 083 for Naha which left ten minutes earlier than Flight 61, and Flight 851 for Hakodate.

Nishizawa had discovered the security flaw a month before the hijacking, and after confirming it on a round-trip flight to Kumamoto, sent letters to the Ministry of Transport, All Nippon Airways, and other agencies, in addition to major newspapers, notifying them of it. Additionally, he requested employment by the airport as a security guard. The airport made one telephone call in response, but no further action was taken until after the hijacking, when procedures were revised comprehensively throughout Japan's airports, eliminating the security flaw.

After the incident, the Japanese Transport Ministry ordered more strict checks with hand-carried baggage brought through security checkpoints before boarding any aircraft.

== Aftermath ==
Nishizawa, born September 8, 1970, in Tokyo was, at the time, a 28-year-old unemployed man from the ward of Edogawa in Tokyo. During the investigation, it was revealed that Nishizawa had taken a large dose of SSRI medication (which are antidepressants) before the episode. Nishizawa was said to be an enthusiast of flight simulators. He said that he hijacked the plane because he wanted to fly it under the Rainbow Bridge in Tokyo. He was also found, in an examination commissioned by his defense attorney, to have Asperger syndrome. On March 23, 2005, he was found guilty but of unsound mind; therefore, he was held only partly responsible for his actions. Days later, presiding judge Hisaharu Yasui sentenced Nishizawa to life imprisonment.

Due to issues of criminal insanity, the mass media had not initially revealed Nishizawa's name when reporting on the case. However, on July 27, the Sankei Shimbun published his name and photograph, with the claim that the incident was a "serious crime". Following this case, the practice of publishing suspects' names in similar circumstances increased in Japanese tabloids and news weeklies, and eventually, national newspapers and news agencies.

The family of Nagashima sued All Nippon Airways, the Japanese state and Nishizawa's family, over Nagashima's death, alleging that poor security at the airport and aboard the plane led to the incident. A settlement with undisclosed terms was reached on December 21, 2007.

== See also ==
- All Nippon Airways Flight 857 – another All Nippon Airways Boeing 747 that was hijacked
- British Airways Flight 2069 – an attempted hijacking of Boeing 747 that was foiled
