= All Nippon Airways Flight 857 =

1995 aircraft hijacking in Japan

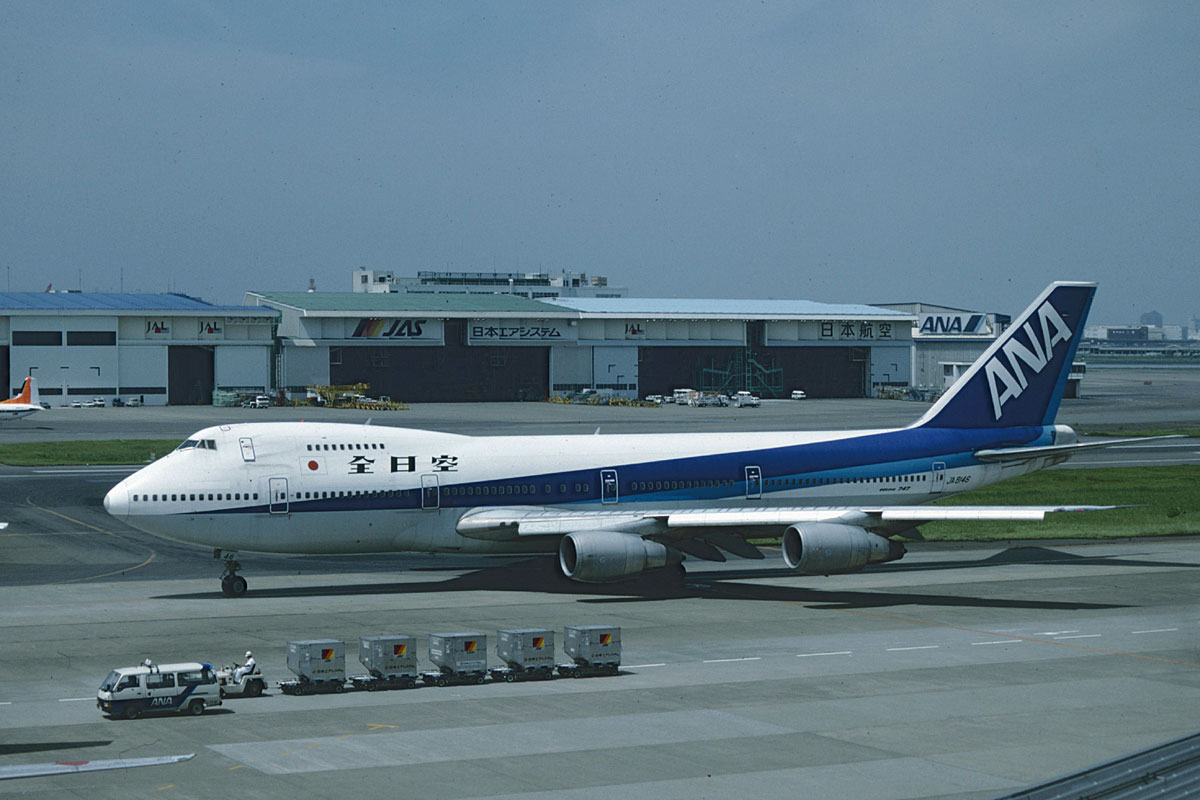
- JA8146, the aircraft involved in the hijacking

Hijacking
- Date: June 21, 1995
- Summary: Hijacking
- Site: Hakodate Airport, Hokkaido, Japan

Aircraft
- Aircraft type: Boeing 747SR-81
- Operator: All Nippon Airways
- Call sign: ALL NIPPON 857
- Registration: JA8146
- Flight origin: Tokyo Haneda Airport, Japan
- Destination: Hakodate Airport, Japan
- Occupants: 365
- Passengers: 350
- Crew: 15
- Fatalities: 0
- Injuries: 2
- Survivors: 365

All Nippon Airways Flight 857 was a scheduled domestic flight from Tokyo Haneda Airport to Hakodate Airport operated by a Boeing 747-100 that was hijacked by a lone individual on June 21, 1995. The aircraft was boarded by police the next morning following an over-night standoff, in the first instance where force was used to respond to an aircraft hijacking in Japan, led by the Hokkaido Prefectural Police with support from the Tokyo Metropolitan Police Department Special Assault Team (then known as the Special Armed Police).

== Hijacking and response ==
At around 11:45 a.m., a single hijacker took control of the Boeing 747 aircraft while it was flying over Yamagata Prefecture, and took the 365 passengers and crew hostage.

The hijacker claimed to be a member of the Aum Shinrikyo religious cult, which was then under investigation for its role in the Tokyo subway sarin attacks. The hijacker claimed to be in possession of plastic explosives and sarin gas, and used these assertions to threaten the crew. At the time, Japanese law enforcement and the public were worried that the hijacking may have been part of a plan to conduct terrorist attacks in order to ensure Asahara's post-apocalyptic visions would be fulfilled.

After the aircraft landed in Hakodate at 12:42 p.m., the hijacker demanded the release of Aum Shinrikyo leader Shoko Asahara, and that the plane be refuelled and returned to Tokyo. He only spoke through the cabin crew, and refused to allow food or drinks to be brought into the aircraft.

In Tokyo, a task force was established consisting of Chief Cabinet Secretary Kozo Igarashi, Japanese Transport Minister Shizuka Kamei and the Public Security Commission chairman, Hiromu Nonaka to oversee the incident.

As the stand-off progressed that evening, the Tokyo Metropolitan Police led a nationwide background search of each passenger on the flight and concluded that the hijacker was the only suspicious individual on board. This conclusion was supported by communication from the pilot and from passengers with mobile phones, who told police that the hijacker was acting alone. One of the passengers in contact with police was folk singer Tokiko Kato, who was en route to a scheduled concert in Hakodate. The Japanese Self-Defense Forces were placed on high alert throughout the incident.

The next day, at 3:42 a.m., at the direction of Prime Minister Tomiichi Murayama, the aircraft was stormed by Hokkaido and Tokyo police units that had previously been monitoring the aircraft from outside. The hijacker was arrested, with only him and one passenger injured.

Some of the officers from the Hokkaido Prefectural Police masqueraded as airport employees when they made the arrest.

The hijacker apologized for his actions and said that he had to do it when he was detained by police.

=== Aftermath ===
The hijacker initially used the name "Saburo Kobayashi," but was found to be Fumio Kutsumi, a 53-year-old Tokyo bank employee from Toyo Trust & Banking on leave for a mental disorder. The "plastic explosives" in his possession were found to actually be made of clay, and his plastic bag of "sarin" was found to actually contain plain water. The hijacker was ultimately sentenced in March 1997 to imprisonment for 8 years, and ordered to pay ¥53 million in civil damages to All Nippon Airways. On appeal, the Sapporo High Court lengthened the criminal sentence to 10 years.

The hijacked aircraft remained in operation with ANA until it was retired in July 2003. ANA still operates the flight number 857 but it currently operates to Hanoi from Haneda, utilizing a Boeing 787 or Boeing 777.

Within a year following the incident, the Special Armed Police, which were then an unofficial unit of the Tokyo police, were upgraded to official status as the Special Assault Team, and similar teams were established in Hokkaido and other prefectures.

The government was criticized in the wake of the incident for failing to disband the Aum group more quickly following the Tokyo subway attacks, on the basis that this may have prevented the hijacking from taking place at all.

== News coverage ==
The incident generated a great deal of live news coverage within Japan while it was ongoing. Nippon TV carried live coverage following the end of a scheduled baseball game, while TV Asahi pre-empted halftime of a live J-League soccer match for live coverage of the incident.

NHK shipped a newly-developed video camera from Tokyo to Hakodate in order to provide clearer news footage of the incident, and provided live footage of the aircraft's landing in Hakodate from a robotic camera positioned at the airport. This was said to be the first live coverage of a landing of a hijacked aircraft.

Several major newspapers published extra editions on the morning of the hijacker's arrest, as it occurred shortly after the deadline for their usual morning editions.

== JASDF involvement in response ==
F-15 fighters were dispatched from the Japan Air Self-Defense Force Chitose Base to escort the hijacked aircraft to Hakodate. SAP forces were carried from Haneda to the site by JASDF Kawasaki C-1 transport aircraft based at Iruma Air Base.

== See also ==
- All Nippon Airways Flight 61 - another All Nippon Airways Boeing 747 that was hijacked
- British Airways Flight 2069 - another Boeing 747 that was hijacked

== Bibliography ==
- Itō, Kōichi (2004). The truth of the Metropolitan Police Special unit (in Japanese). Dainihon-kaiga. ISBN 978-4499228657.
