= Gottröra =

Village in Norrtälje Municipality, Uppland province, Sweden

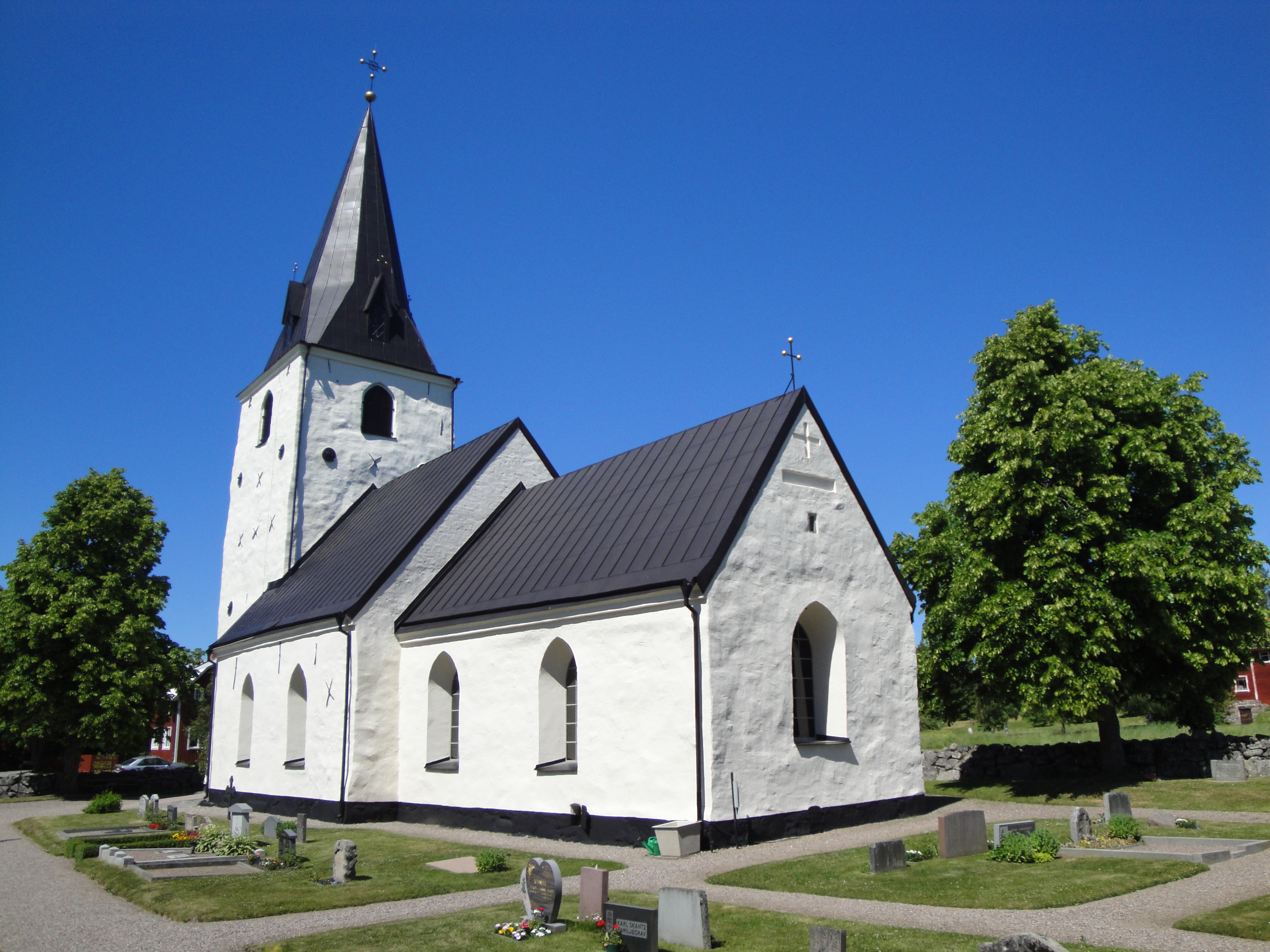
- Gottröra Church

- Location within Stockholm Location within Sweden Location within European Union
- Country: Sweden
- County: Stockholm
- Municipality: Norrtälje

Population
  - Total: 749
- Time zone: UTC+1 (CET)
  - Summer (DST): UTC+2 (CEST)

Gottröra is a village in Norrtälje Municipality in the county of Stockholm, Sweden. Several hundred ancient monuments are registered in Gottröra. Its population was 658 in the 2020 census.

On 27 December 1991, Scandinavian Airlines Flight 751 made an emergency landing near Gottröra.
