= Nationwide Airlines Flight 723 =

2007 aviation accident in South Africa

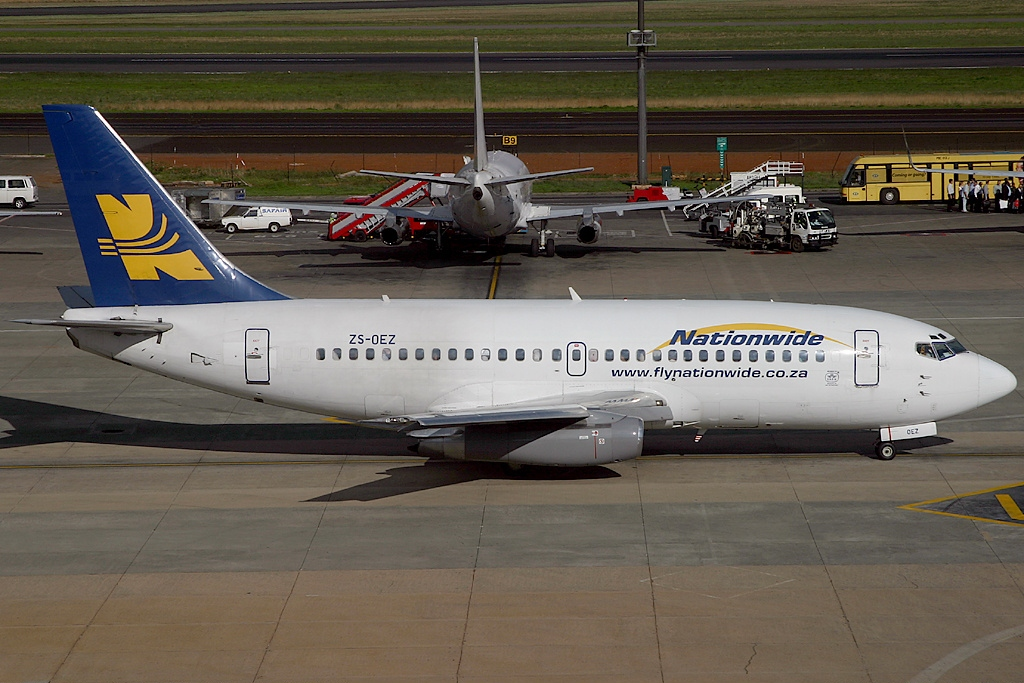
- ZS-OEZ, the aircraft involved in the accident, seen in 2005

Accident
- Date: 7 November 2007
- Summary: Engine separation; subsequent emergency landing
- Site: Cape Town International Airport, Cape Town, South Africa

Aircraft
- Aircraft type: Boeing 737-230A
- Operator: Nationwide Airlines
- IATA flight No.: CE723
- ICAO flight No.: NTW723
- Call sign: NATIONWIDE 723
- Registration: ZS-OEZ
- Flight origin: Cape Town International Airport, Cape Town, South Africa
- Destination: O. R. Tambo International Airport, Gauteng, South Africa
- Occupants: 112
- Passengers: 106
- Crew: 6
- Fatalities: 0
- Survivors: 112

On 7 November 2007, Nationwide Airlines Flight 723, a Boeing 737-230A owned and operated by Nationwide Airlines, was performing a scheduled domestic flight from Cape Town International Airport to O. R. Tambo International Airport. During the rotation from runway 01, engine No.2 detached from the right wing. The pilots then proceeded to takeoff and declared an emergency, eventually making an emergency landing. All 112 occupants survived without injuries.

== Background ==
=== Aircraft ===
The aircraft involved, manufactured in 1981, was a Boeing 737-230A, registered as ZS-OEZ with the serial number 22118. In its 26 years of service, it had logged 57,075.9 hours of flying time. It was powered by two Pratt & Whitney JT8D-15A engines.

=== Crew ===
In command was 50-year-old Captain Trevor Arnold, a South African man. He had logged 13,860 hours of total flying time, including 3,277 logged on the 737-200. He was hired by Nationwide Airlines on 1 November 1997 but after three years, on 15 December 2000, he resigned. About six years later, on 24 May 2006, he was rehired and flew for the same airline until the day of the accident. His co-pilot was First Officer Daniel Perry, a 25-year-old South African man. He had logged 1,007 hours of flying time, 278 hours of which were logged on the 737-200. He was hired by the airline just months prior to the accident. He was also the pilot flying on this flight.

== Accident ==
During the 737's rotation from runway 01, a bang was heard in the cabin and cockpit. The aft cone bolt on engine #2 sheared off, causing the aircraft to bank left, as the engine began giving upwards thrust, and very shortly after, engine #2 separated from the aircraft, causing a severe jolt to the right. The flight crew managed to regain control of the aircraft and set it on a climb to 3,000 feet. One orbit was performed around the airport, during which another flight was landing on runway 01. The pilots began troubleshooting the issue, noticing fuel and hydraulics leaking from the area where engine #2 had previously been. The landing South African Airways flight was alerted by the air traffic control (ATC) about possible debris on the runway, without telling them to go-around. During the chaos, the air traffic controller had pressed the crash alarm, alerting emergency services about the event, because at the time, he had observed the aircraft in a dive, however, it was not. Both the ATC and the landing flight opted to continue its approach and following the landing, the flight crew reported debris on the runway. Consequently, the ATC advised Flight 723 to continue its orbit while maintaining the same altitude. At the same time, emergency personnel were dispatched to the runway to clear the debris for Flight 723. At 16:10 local time, after 14 minutes and 19 seconds during the cleaning process, the runway was cleared. The 737 then successfully executed a safe landing on runway 01 without any brakes and cleared the runway by taxiing into the taxiway before shutting down the remaining engine. The passengers were told to remain seated to await a stairtruck. The evacuation of passengers was carried out smoothly, and there was no need to use the emergency escape slides. All individuals exited the aircraft safely, and no additional incidents were reported.

Cape Town International Airport was re-opened at 16:58 local time, and at 17:15 local time, the first aircraft departed following the accident.

== Investigation and cause ==
The South African Civil Aviation Authority (SACAA) and the US National Transportation Safety Board (NTSB) were in-charge of the investigation.

=== On-site investigation ===
The investigators at the site of the parked Nationwide aircraft noted that the right-hand engine's forward engine mount support (FEMS) had given-out at the inboard engine attachment point. The bolt at the shear section of the outboard engine mount cone had also broken. Although the inboard cone bolt did not break, it remained connected to the inboard FEMS fitting. Also, the rear cone bolt was found to have fractured at its shear section. The aft secondary support was not retrieved from the accident site. The engine debris on the runway was removed before the aircraft came back for the emergency landing. Consequently, the precise location and position of the debris could not be established during the on-site investigation.

=== Further investigation ===
Two respective test analyses were performed by the Facet Consulting in South Africa and the NTSB in the United States. The investigating team also asked Boeing Commercial Airplanes to conduct a chemical analysis of samples taken from the three cone bolts and the forward engine mount supporting fitting received during the on-site investigation. Before being sent to the NTSB, the broken cone bolts and the FEMS had already been examined and sectioned. All recovered failed components underwent metallurgical analysis, which indicated that the aft cone bolt had failed due to fatigue. This fatigue failure was likely caused by improper maintenance. Meanwhile, the front outboard cone bolt and the front engine support structure failed due to overload as the engine moved forward and sideways during the engine separation sequence.

=== Cause ===
On 30 October 2009, the SACAA released the final report of the accident. The agency stated that the right engine detached from the aircraft because the aft cone bolt failed due to a pre-existing fatigue crack, which was likely a result of improper installation of the bolt.

== Aftermath ==
=== Safety recommendations ===
The Commissioner for Civil Aviation set a minimum standard procedure, known as a Safety Management System, to help educate operators in managing risks within their operations.

=== Nationwide Airlines groundings ===
On 30 November 2007, the South African Civil Aviation Authority (SACAA) grounded the whole fleet of Nationwide Airlines due to concerns of Nationwide's maintenance practice on its aircraft. On 7 December, the SACAA agreed to allow Nationwide to continue operating its sole Boeing 767-300ER mainly because KLM was in charge of the 767's maintenance. On 24 December, the suspension was lifted but Nationwide lost most of its holiday season passengers leading to pressure on its revenue and the eventual shutdown of Nationwide Airlines on 29 April 2008.

=== Crew awards ===
Captain Trevor Arnold was awarded the Polaris Award because of how he handled the emergency.

=== Accident aircraft aftermath ===
ZS-OEZ, the aircraft involved, was written-off and scrapped.
