= Scandinavian Airlines System Flight 751 =

1991 aviation accident in Sweden

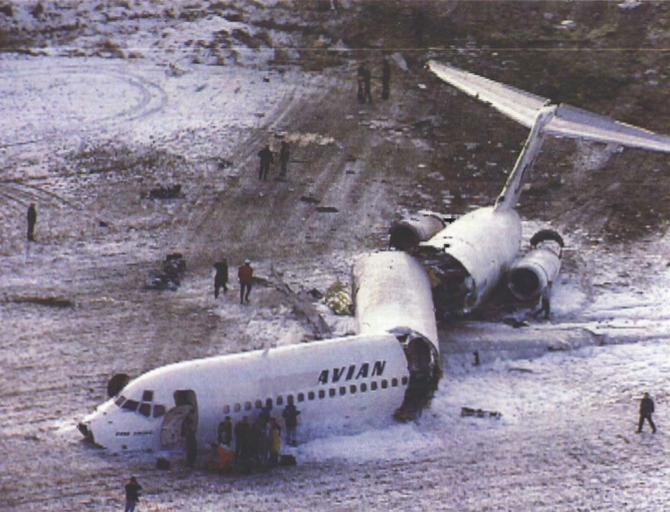
- Wreckage of the aircraft

Accident
- Date: 27 December 1991
- Summary: Dual engine failure due to foreign object damage
- Site: Gottröra, Norrtälje Municipality, Sweden; 59°46′06″N 018°07′55″E

Aircraft
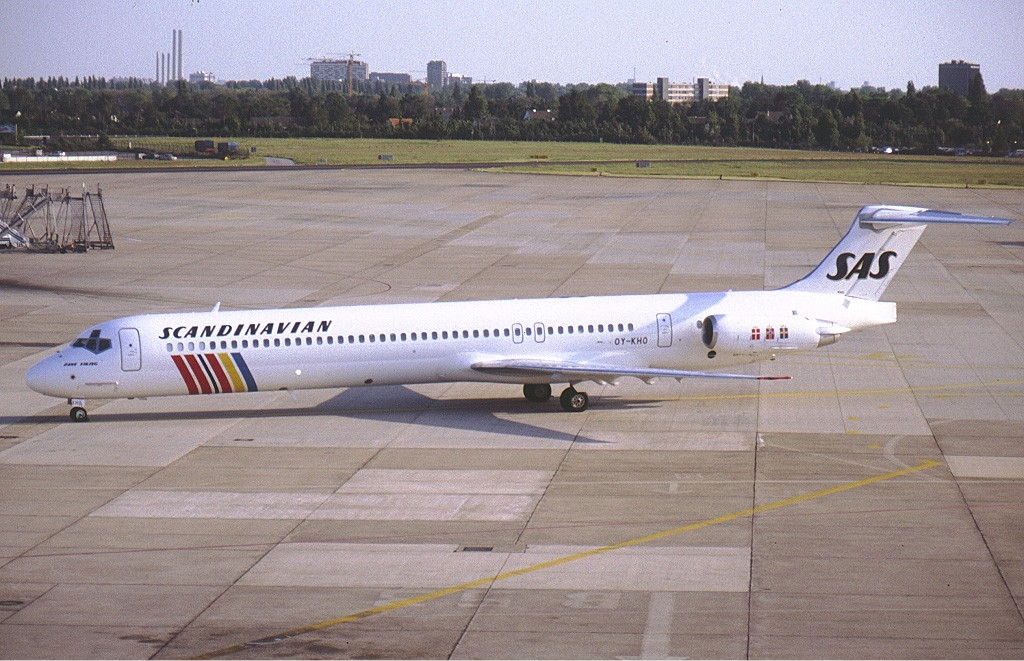
- OY-KHO, the aircraft involved in the accident, seen in June 1991
- Aircraft type: McDonnell Douglas MD-81
- Aircraft name: Dana Viking
- Operator: Scandinavian Airlines System
- IATA flight No.: SK751
- ICAO flight No.: SAS751
- Call sign: SCANDINAVIAN 751
- Registration: OY-KHO
- Flight origin: Stockholm Arlanda Airport
- Stopover: Copenhagen Airport
- Destination: Warsaw Chopin Airport
- Occupants: 129
- Passengers: 123
- Crew: 6
- Fatalities: 0
- Injuries: 92
- Survivors: 129

Scandinavian Airlines System Flight 751 was a regularly scheduled Scandinavian Airlines passenger flight from Stockholm, Sweden, to Warsaw, Poland, via Copenhagen, Denmark. On 27 December 1991, a McDonnell Douglas MD-81 operating the flight, registration OY-KHO, piloted by Danish Captain Stefan G. Rasmussen (44) and Swedish first officer Ulf Cedermark (34), both experienced pilots with 8,000 and 3,000 flight hours, respectively, was forced to make an emergency landing in a field near Gottröra, Sweden. Ice had collected on the wings' inner roots (close to the fuselage) before takeoff, broke off, and was ingested into the engines as the aircraft became airborne, ultimately disabling both engines. All 129 passengers and crew aboard survived.

The incident is known as the Gottröra crash (Swedish: Gottrörakraschen) or the Miracle at Gottröra (Swedish: Miraklet i Gottröra) in Sweden.

== Aircraft ==
The aircraft involved was a McDonnell Douglas MD-81, MSN 53003, registered as OY-KHO, that was manufactured by McDonnell Douglas in 1991. It had logged approximately 1608 airframe hours and 1272 takeoff and landing cycles and was equipped with two Pratt & Whitney JT8D-217C engines.

== Accident ==
The aircraft had arrived at Stockholm Arlanda Airport at 22:09 local time after a flight from Zürich the previous evening and was parked overnight at temperatures of around 0 to 1 °C (32 to 34 °F). About 2,550 kilograms (5,620 lb) of very cold, flight-chilled fuel remained in the wing tanks. Due to this, clear ice had formed on the upper side of the wings, but was not detected. The aircraft was de-iced with 850 litres (220 US gal) of de-icing fluid, but not checked afterwards for remaining ice by the de-icing personnel or the Pilot-in-Charge, Captain Rasmussen, which he was required to do by the Scandinavian Airlines "Flight Deck Bulletin/Winterization" given to pilots.

The plane departed from Stockholm at 08:47. Shortly after liftoff, pieces of ice broke off and slammed into the fans of both engines, deforming the fan blades sufficiently to disturb the airflow to the compressors. The disturbed airflow caused the compressors to stall and this in turn caused the engines to surge. As the engines were not throttled down sufficiently, the surges continued. The high loads from repeated engine surges quickly led to the breakup of both engines.

From the pilots' point of view, after 25 seconds of flight, noises and vibrations caused by the no. 2 engine surging were first noticed. The flight crew responded by throttling down a little, but an automatic system, ATR (automatic thrust restoration), that had not been described to the flight crew by SAS, simultaneously increased throttle as a response to the asymmetric engine power and reduced climb rate. As a consequence, the engine surges continued. SAS Flight Captain Per Holmberg, who was on board as a passenger, noticed the problems early, hurried to the cockpit, and provided invaluable assistance to the crew. Engine no. 1 surged 39 seconds later and both engines failed at 76 and 78 seconds, respectively, into flight, at an altitude of 3,220 ft (980 m).

The pilot responded to the loss of both engines by pitching the aircraft down in a dive before leveling it, to try to have it glide the longest possible distance without stalling. The pilots requested a return to Arlanda and attempted the restart procedure, but, with the aircraft emerging from cloud cover at 890 ft (270 m) altitude, they chose a field in the forest, near the Vängsjöberg seat farm in Gottröra, Uppland, for an immediate emergency landing.

During the final descent, the aircraft hit several trees, losing a large part of the right wing. It struck the ground tail-first, and the tail cone of the plane broke off. The plane slid across the field for 110 metres (360 ft), during which the main landing gear of the plane dug marks into the field and sheared off, the nose landing gear broke off, and the fuselage broke into three parts. As a result of the accident, 25 people were injured—two of them seriously—but there were no fatalities. The flight attendants had instructed passengers to adopt the brace position, which is credited with the lack of fatalities.

The flight crew, and especially Captain Rasmussen, were lauded for the skilled emergency landing in a fast-developing, potentially fatal situation. Rasmussen commented that "few civilian air pilots are ever put to a test of the skills they have acquired during training to this degree". He said he was proud of his crew and very relieved everyone had survived. He chose not to return to piloting commercial aircraft, after experiencing a lack of trust in the machinery he was piloting in simulator sessions following the accident. In 2022 he still suffered from PTSD from the aftermath of the accident when he was both called a hero and a villain despite him just believing he did the job he was trained for.

== Investigation and recommendations ==
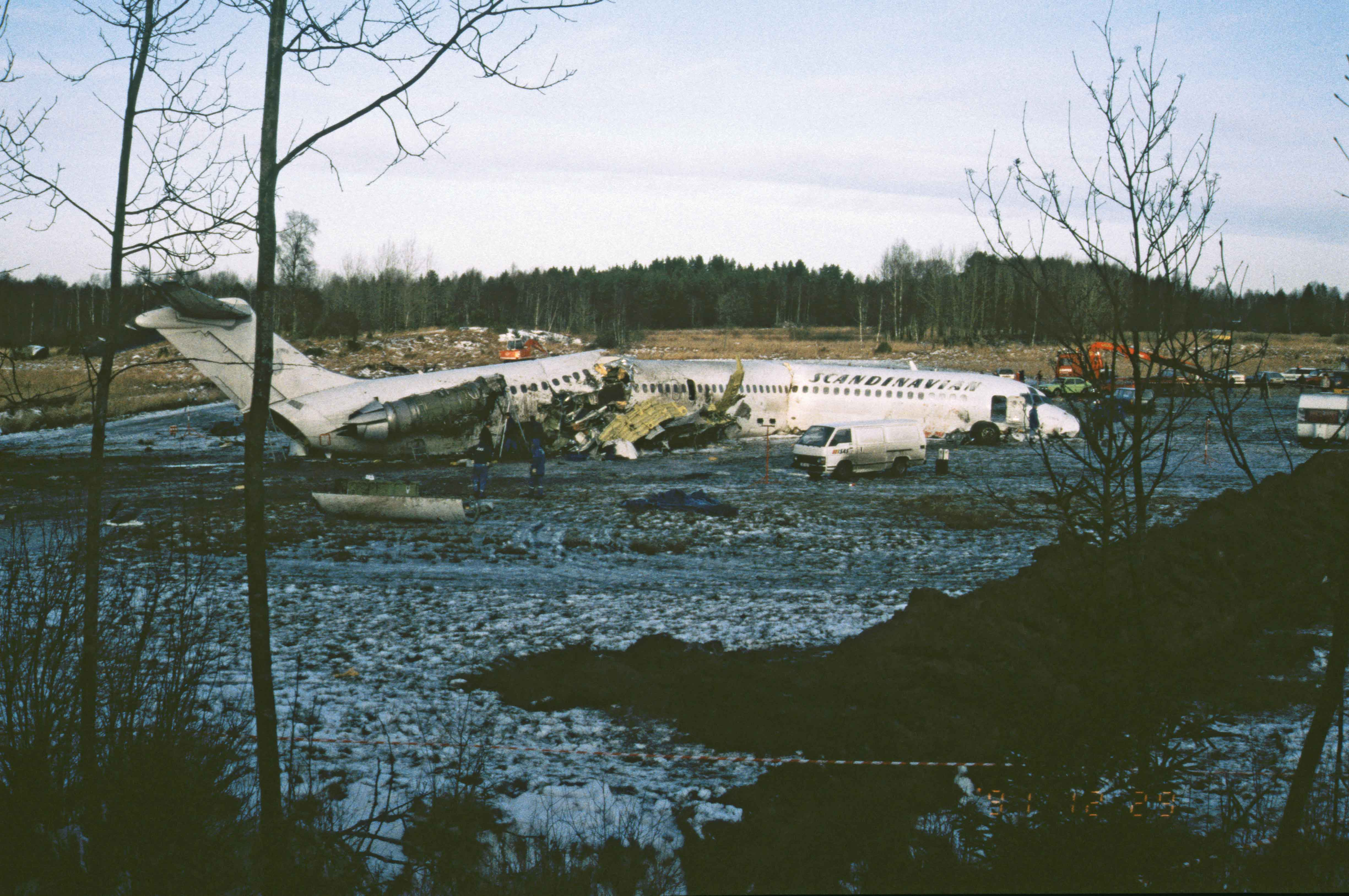
Wreckage of the MD-81 from another view

According to the official accident report by the Swedish Accident Investigation Board (SHK), the problem of clear ice formation on the wings in this type of aircraft was a well-known phenomenon at the time of the accident. From 1985 onward, McDonnell Douglas gave extensive information, including several "All Operators Letters" that dealt with the clear ice problem. In the "All Operators Letter" of 14 October 1986, operators were informed of how the Finnish airline Finnair had solved the problem of discovering clear ice. In 1988 and 1989, McDonnell Douglas arranged "Theme Conferences" dealing with clear ice formation. SAS took part in these conferences.

On 26 October 1991, SAS distributed a "Flight Deck Bulletin/Winterization" to all pilots. It stated: "It is the Pilot-in-Charge's responsibility to check the aircraft for any ice or snow that may affect performance" and in the section "Clear Ice", it noted " [a]lthough the awareness within Line Maintenance is mostly good, the responsibility again rests with the Pilot-in-Charge that the aircraft is physically checked by means of a hands-on check on the upper side of the wing. A visual check from a ladder or when standing on the ground is not enough".

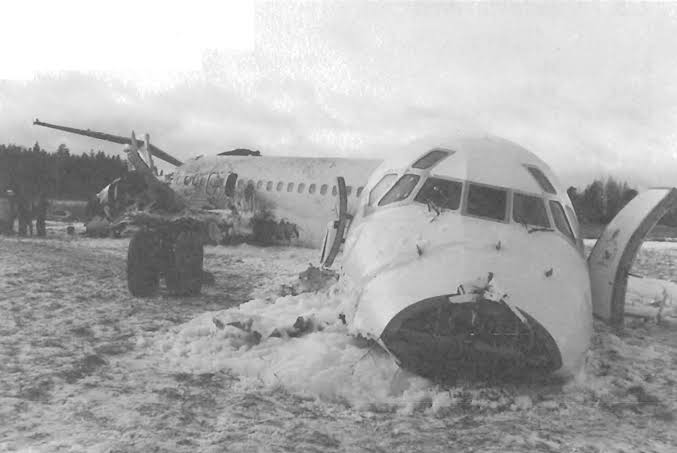
Nose view of the wreckage

Another contribution to the accident was insufficient training of the crew; they were not trained in restoring engine operation after they repeatedly surged. There was no simulator or other training on the engine surging problem. Secondly, they were not informed about a pre-installed automatic thrust system (automatic thrust restoration or ATR). The reason for this lapse of information was that there was no knowledge of ATR within SAS. Nonetheless, ATR was described in manuals by the aircraft manufacturer, which every operator is obliged to know. Even though the system was developed for use in procedures not applied by SAS, a sufficiently careful study of the manuals should have led to SAS noting the system and training its pilots in its function.

The conclusion of the official accident report stated:

The accident was caused by SAS' instructions and routines being inadequate to ensure that clear ice was removed from the wings of the aircraft before takeoff. Hence the aircraft took off with clear ice on the wings. In connection with liftoff, the clear ice loosened and was ingested by the engines. The ice caused damage to the engine fan stages, which led to engine surges. The surges destroyed the engines.

Contributory causes were:

- The pilots were not trained to identify and eliminate engine surging.
- ATR, which was unknown within SAS, was activated and increased the engine power without the pilots' knowledge.

In the section "Compressor Failures", the report stated:

With sufficiently reduced thrust in the right engine and maintained thrust in the left, the engines would probably not have failed. The aircraft would then have been able to return for landing.

The newly installed ATR prevented the pilots from successfully performing the normal remedial measure to halt compressor stall, i.e., throttling back the engines, as the ATR system — designed to prevent pilots from using less than normal thrust when climbing out after take-off for noise abatement reasons — restored engine take-off power throttle settings, contrary to the pilots' reduced throttle commands. This damaged the engines, until eventually, they failed completely, removing any possibility of a crash-avoiding restart.

== In popular culture ==
The story of the accident was featured on the tenth season of the Canadian TV series Mayday. The episode is titled "Pilot Betrayed".

== See also ==
- List of airline flights that required gliding
- Ural Airlines Flight 178 – 2019 accident after both engines failed following a bird strike shortly after takeoff
- US Airways Flight 1549 – 2009 accident after both engines failed following a bird strike shortly after takeoff
- British Airways Flight 38, a case where ice in the fuel system blocked the engines from receiving the fuel they needed, leading to dual engine failure
- Southern Airways Flight 242, a flight that experienced dual engine failure after their engines ingested hail
- TACA Flight 110, a flight that suffered dual engine failure after their engines ingested an extreme amount of rain
- Lion Air Flight 610 and Ethiopian Airlines Flight 302, flights where a safety system unknown to the flight crew caused an accident
