= Racing the Storm =

Racing the Storm may refer to:

- Racing the Storm (album), a 2023 album by Emilíana Torrini
- "Racing the Storm" (Mayday), a 2003 television episode
