= Michael Van Valkenburgh =

American landscape architect (born 1951)

- Born: September 5, 1951 (age 74)
- Occupation: Landscape architect
- Employer: Michael Van Valkenburgh Associates
- Spouse: Caroline Van Valkenburgh
- Children: (1) Lexi Van Valkenburgh

Michael Robert Van Valkenburgh (born September 5, 1951) is an American landscape architect and educator. He has worked on a wide variety of projects – including public parks, college campuses, sculpture gardens, corporate landscapes, private gardens, and urban master plans – in the U.S., Canada, Europe and Asia. He has taught at Harvard's Graduate School of Design Since 1982 and served as chair of its Landscape Architecture Department from 1991 to 1996.

== Life and career ==
=== Early years and education ===
Michael Van Valkenburgh was born on September 5, 1951, and grew up in Lexington, New York, where his family owned a small dairy farm. He has said: "My earliest childhood memories involve powerful images of landscapes. I grew up among open fields, planted hedgerows, and orchards chiseled into the rolling, otherwise-forested Catskill Mountains. And so landscapes made by human hands and by the indomitable power of nature have lived side-by-side in my imagination."

Van Valkenburgh received a Bachelor of Science from the College of Agriculture at Cornell University in 1973, studied photography at the School of the Museum of Fine Arts, Boston, from 1974 to 1975, and earned an MFA in landscape architecture from the College of Fine Arts at the University of Illinois at Urbana-Champaign in 1977. The focus of his graduate study was environmental psychology, specifically the relationship between people and landscapes. He worked at Carr, Lynch, Associates, Inc., in Cambridge, Massachusetts, from 1979 until 1982, when he founded his own firm, Michael Van Valkenburgh Associates, Inc. He received a grant from the National Endowment for the Arts which allowed him to experiment with ice as a material in landscape design. In 1988, Van Valkenburgh received the Rome Prize from the American Academy in Rome.

=== Teaching career ===
Van Valkenburgh is the Charles Eliot Professor of Practice, Emeritus at the Graduate School of Design at Harvard University. His career at the GSD began in 1982; he served as program director from 1987 to 1989, and as Chairman of the Department of Landscape Architecture from 1991 to 1996.

=== Design approach and inspiration ===
Van Valkenburgh describes his work as an exploration of the living qualities of the landscape and an attempt to bring the power of landscape experience into everyday life. His designs are based on a sensitivity to the particular qualities of each project site and thus do not necessarily resemble one another with respect to form, details, or imagery. According to fellow landscape architect James Corner, Van Valkenburgh's work demonstrates "that the knowledge of a place derives more deeply through experience of material, time, and event, than through visuality alone, and that landscape experience is fuller and more profound when it accrues through inhabitation than through the immediacy of the image or the objectification of the new."

As a landscape architect, he has been influenced by his upbringing in an agricultural setting and his education at Cornell University during the 1970s—in particular his exposure to Ian McHarg's ground-breaking book Design with Nature. Van Valkenburgh has been recognized for his ability to successfully integrate new methods of sustainable design and ecological renewal into the experience of the places he designs, making sustainability part of the beauty of a place that educates visitors and raises environmental awareness.

Crediting artist Robert Smithson's writings on Frederick Law Olmsted and the "landscape dialectic" as a source of inspiration, Van Valkenburgh's landscapes are sometimes completely original explorations of naturalism and the constructed urban landscape (for instance, Teardrop Park and Brooklyn Bridge Park) but he has also completed many sensitive historic landscape restorations including Harvard Yard; Marion Square in Charleston, South Carolina; and several works at Wellesley College. According to landscape theorist Anita Berrizbeitia, in her introduction to a book of essays on the work of MVVA, "His parks and public open spaces are based on the conviction that not only can the power of nature and the power of the man-made coexist, but they are the better for doing so."

Van Valkenburgh approaches his designs in such a way that the spirit of place is at the forefront and the center of the design. To create a space that reflects the desired future for an area and give it a spirit of hope and progress requires a lot of foresight to the desired effect. Van Valkenburgh designs his projects in a way that reflect the desired future of the area in the spirit of the place they are striving for. His projects often begin with ordinary places that he is able to rejuvenate into a place that cause people to look past what it was and instead look to the future of the park as well as the surrounding city because of the spirit of the place Michael Van Valkenburgh has instilled in the space with his adaptive reuse of this post industrial wasteland and his intentional intertwining of it with nature.

Noting how many celebrated urban parks Van Valkenburgh has designed, The New York Times called him “a diviner of places, a city whisperer.” Adrian Benepe, the former New York City parks commissioner, compared him to Frederick Law Olmsted, the creator (with Calvert Vaux) of Central Park in Manhattan and Prospect Park in Brooklyn. “Michael is the most Olmstedian of the landscape architects working today, without ever copying Olmsted directly," Benepe said.

=== Michael Van Valkenburgh Associates, Inc. ===
Having founded Michael Van Valkenburgh Associates, Inc. (MVVA) in 1982, he currently leads the firm with five fellow partners: Laura Solano, Matthew Urbanski, Paul Seck, Gullivar Shepard, and Emily Mueller De Celis. The firm has 100 employees and three offices, in Cambridge, Massachusetts, Brooklyn, New York and Denver, Colorado. MVVA has completed a broad range of landscape design, construction, and restoration projects in both the public and private realms. To date, MVVA has completed over 350 projects and has cultivated an expertise in sustainability, soil toxicity, and waterfront infrastructure. The firm collaborates frequently with artists, including Maya Lin, Ann Hamilton, Martin Puryear, Mel Bochner, Meg Webster, and Oscar Tuazon.

==== Awards ====
His practice has won many national awards for its designs, including 19 from the American Society of Landscape Architects. These awards include:

- For Allegheny Riverfront Park, in Pittsburgh, Pennsylvania:
  - 1997 Progressive Architecture Awards citation, Architecture Magazine
  - 2002 Design Merit Award, ASLA
  - 2002 Place-Making Award, Places Magazine/Environmental Design Research Association
- For Brooklyn Bridge Park, in Brooklyn, New York:
  - 2009 Analysis & Planning Honor Award, ASLA
  - 2009 Waterfront Plan Honor Award, WaterFront Center
  - 2010 "Designing the Parks" Honor Award, National Park Service
  - 2011 Rudy Bruner Award for Urban Excellence (silver medal), Bruner Foundation
- For the master plan for the Lower Don Lands, in Toronto, Ontario:
  - 2007 Toronto Urban Design Award, City of Toronto
  - 2008 Analysis & Planning Honor Award, ASLA
  - 2008 Special Jury Award for Sustainable Development, Royal Architectural Institute of Canada
  - 2009 International Award for Best Futuristic Design, Building Exchange Summit
  - 2010 Transportation Achievement Award, Institute of Transportation Engineers
  - 2011 Excellence in Planning Award, Ontario Professional Planners Institute
- For Teardrop Park, in Battery Park City, New York City, New York:
  - 2009 General Design Honor Award, ASLA
  - 2010 "Designing the Parks" Honor Award, National Park Service
- For the restoration of Harvard Yard, at Harvard University, in Cambridge, Massachusetts:
  - 1993 Planning & Urban Design Merit Award, ASLA
  - 1994 Honor Award, National Trust for Historic Preservation
- For work at Wellesley College, in Wellesley, Massachusetts:
  - 1999 Planning & Analysis Merit Award, ASLA (for the campus master plan)
  - 2006 General Design Award of Excellence, ASLA (for Alumnae Valley)
- 1989 Design Honor Award, ASLA, for the Regis Garden, at the Walker Art Center in Minneapolis, Minnesota
- 1990 Design Merit Award, for the Black Granite Garden in Los Angeles, California
- 1998 Design Merit Award, ASLA, for the Vera List Courtyard, at The New School in New York City, New York
- 2002 Design Merit Award, ASLA, for Spider Island, at the Chicago Botanic Garden in Glencoe, Illinois
- 2004 Design Merit Award, ASLA, for the Garden on Turtle Creek, in Dallas, Texas
- 2005 Design Honor Award, ASLA, for the Herman Miller Factory landscape, in Cherokee County, Georgia
- 2006 Design Honor Award, ASLA, for Tahari Courtyards, in Millburn, New Jersey
- 2008 Design Honor Award, ASLA, for the Smith Family Waterfront Park, at the Boston Children's Museum in Boston, Massachusetts
- 2008 Residential Design Honor Award, ASLA, for the Nomentana Garden, in Stoneham, Maine
- 2010 Design Honor Award, ASLA, for the Lake Whitney Water Treatment Facility landscape, in New Haven, Connecticut

=== Other works and activities ===
Blueprints at Addison Circle is a steel sculpture located in Addison, Texas designed in conjunction with artist Mel Chin dedicated on April 13, 2000.

Michael Van Valkenburgh devotes himself to design work and teaching. He has a National Council of Landscape Architectural Registration Board certification and is a registered Landscape Architect in twenty states. In 2002, he was a speaker in the Spotlight on Design Lecture Series at the National Building Museum. In 2003, Van Valkenburgh served on the selection jury of the World Trade Center Site Memorial Competition and won the National Design Award for Environmental Design from the Smithsonian Institution's Cooper-Hewitt National Design Museum. In November 2004, Van Valkenburgh was personally thanked by First Lady Laura Bush for his design for the renovation of Pennsylvania Avenue in Washington, D.C. In 2007, Van Valkenburgh was asked to present the Rutgers Department of Landscape Architecture Margaret O. Cekada Memorial Lecture. In 2010, he was awarded two major prizes: the Arnold W. Brunner Memorial Prize in Architecture, from the American Academy of Arts and letters, for contributions to architecture as an art, and the Brendan Gill Prize from the Municipal Arts Society of New York City, which recognized Brooklyn Bridge Park as the work of art that best captured the spirit and energy of New York City.

== Publications ==
=== Books ===
- Designing a Garden: Monk's Garden at the Isabella Stewart Gardner Museum, Michael Van Valkenburgh, essay by Laurie Olin, Monacelli Press, 2019
- Foreword, Taking Measures Across the American Landscape (by James Corner and Alexander S. MacLean), New Haven, CT: Yale University Press, 1996.
- Design with the Land: Landscape Architecture of Michael Van Valkenburgh, Princeton Architectural Press, 1994
- Gertrude Jekyll: A Vision of Garden and Wood (with Judith B. Tankard), Sagapress, 1989.
- The Flower Gardens of Gertrude Jekyll and Their Twentieth-Century Transformations, Design Quarterly 137, MIT Press for the Walker Art Center, 1987.
- Transforming the American Garden: 12 New Landscape Designs (with Margaret B. Reeve, and Jory Johnson), Cambridge, MA: Harvard University Graduate School of Design, 1986
  - Built Landscapes: Gardens in the Northeast, Brattleboro Museum & Art Center, 1984

=== Articles ===
- "Built Landscapes, Ecologies and Re-defining 'Preservation'", CRM: The Journal of Heritage Stewardship, National Park Service, v.7, n.2, Summer 2010
- "Faculty project: Teardrop Park [Battery Park City, New York]", Harvard Design Magazine, n.12 (Fall 2000), pp. 92–93
- "Ein Hof mit Streifen", Garten + Landschaft, v.106, n.2 (Feb. 1996), pp. 26–28
- "Restoring The Harvard Yard Landscape", Arnoldia, Spring 1994 (with Peter Del Tredici)
- "Conceiving a Courtyard", Places, Spring 1990 (with Carol Doyle Van Valkenburgh)
- "Best laid plan: Gertrude Jekyll's brilliant planting and Edwin Lutyen's architectural mastery make Hestercombe a superb example of collaborative garden design". House & garden, v.161, n.3 (Mar. 1989), pp. 150–157 (with Carol Doyle Van Valkenburgh)
- "The Flower gardens of Gertrude Jekyll and their twentieth-century transformations" Design Quarterly, no.137 (1987), pp. 1–30
- "Notations of nature's process", Landscape Architecture, v.76, no.1 (Jan.-Feb. 1986), pp. 40–45
- "Two Views of Landscape Design: A.E. Bye and Dan Kiley," Orion Quarterly, Spring 1985.
- "Built Landscapes at Wave Hill," New York Times, August 11, 1984.
- "Ice: To Freeze on Walls," Landscape Architecture, January 1984.
- "Illusion of Space," Garden Design, Vol. 1, No. 1 (March 1982).
- "Garden Spot for Half a House," Landscape Architecture, March 1981.
- "Principles for the Design of a Mixed Use Development in Kendall Square, Cambridge, Massachusetts," Cambridge Redevelopment Authority, October 1978.
- "Grade School Children's Use of and Attitudes about Two Play Areas in Carle Park, Urbana, Illinois," Proceedings of the Ninth Conference of the Environmental Design Research Association, Washington, D.C., April 1978.

=== Publications about Michael Van Valkenburgh and MVVA ===
- Amidon, J., Michael Van Valkenburgh/Allegheny Riverfront Park: Source Books in Landscape Architecture, Princeton Architectural Press, 2005
- Berrizbeitia, A., Michael Van Valkenburgh Associates: Reconstructing Urban Landscapes, Yale University Press, 2009
- Blum, A., "The Active Edge", Metropolis, March 2006
- Gilette, J., "Michael", Landscape Architecture Magazine, Feb. 1998
- Werthmann, C., Green Roof - A Case Study: Michael Van Valkenburgh Associates' Design for the Headquarters of the American Society of Landscape Architects, Princeton Architectural Press, 2007
- Mitani, T., "American Landscape Architecture", Space Design (Japan), Summer 1998

== Notable works ==
=== Completed ===
- Regis Garden, Walker Art Center, Minneapolis, Minnesota, 1988
- Radcliffe Ice Walls, Harvard University, Cambridge, Massachusetts, 1988
- Garden on Lake Minnetonka, Wayzata, Minnesota, 1989
- Krakow Ice Garden, Martha's Vineyard, Massachusetts, 1990
- Pucker Garden, Brookline, Massachusetts, 1990
- General Mills Sculpture Garden, Minneapolis, Minnesota, 1991 (destroyed 2000)
- Jardin des Tuileries, Paris, France, 1991
- Mill Race Park, Columbus, Indiana, 1993
- 50 Avenue Montaigne Courtyard, Paris, France, 1993
- Oakville Park Completion, Oakville, Ontario, 1993
- Ho-Am Art Museum and Sculpture Garden, Seoul, South Korea, 1993
- Vera List Courtyard, The New School, New York City, New York, 1997
- Allegheny Riverfront Park, Pittsburgh, Pennsylvania, 1998
- Garden on Turtle Creek, Dallas, Texas, 1999
- Spider Island, Chicago Botanic Garden, Glencoe, Illinois, 2000
- Herman Miller Factory Landscape, Cherokee County, Georgia, 2001
- Marion Square, Charleston, SC, 2002
- Straightsview Farm, San Juan Island, Washington, 2003
- Harvard Yard Restoration, Harvard University, Cambridge, Massachusetts, 2003
- Peabody Essex Museum landscape, Salem, Massachusetts, 2003
- Tahari Courtyards, Millburn, New Jersey, 2003
- Kraus Campo, Carnegie Mellon University, Pittsburgh, Pennsylvania, 2003
- Renovation of Pennsylvania Avenue at the White House, Washington, D.C., 2004
- Nomentana Garden, Stoneham, Maine, 2005
- Alumnae Valley, Wellesley College, Wellesley, Massachusetts, 2005
- Lake Whitney Water Treatment Plant, New Haven, Connecticut, 2005
- Green Roof, ASLA Headquarters, Washington, D.C., 2006
- Bailey Plaza, Cornell University, Ithaca, New York, 2007
- Smith Family Waterfront Park, Boston Children's Museum, Boston, Massachusetts, 2007
- Union Square North End Plaza and Playground, New York City, New York, 2010
- Segment 5 (Piers 62–64), Hudson River Park, New York City, New York, 2010
- BJC Institute of Health Plaza (with Maya Lin), Washington University in St. Louis, St. Louis, Missouri, 2010
- Teardrop Park, Battery Park City, New York City, New York, 2010
- Corktown Common, Toronto, Ontario, 2011
- Penn Park, University of Pennsylvania, Philadelphia, Pennsylvania, 2011
- Charles B. Hayes Family Sculpture Park, Raclin Murphy Museum of Art, 2013
- Gateway Arch National Park, St. Louis, Missouri, 2018
- Gathering Place: Tulsa Riverfront Park, Tulsa, Oklahoma, 2018
- Bennett Park, Chicago, Illinois, 2019

=== In progress ===
- Brooklyn Bridge Park, Brooklyn
- Rijnhavenpark, Rotterdam, The Netherlands
- George W. Bush Presidential Center landscape, Dallas, Texas
- York Quay, Toronto, Ontario
- Brooklyn Botanic Garden renovation, Brooklyn, New York
- Maggie Daley Park, Chicago, Illinois
- Lower Don Lands, Toronto, Ontario
- Waller Creek, Austin, Texas
- Hudson Park and Boulevard, New York City, New York
- Dorothea Dix Park, Raleigh, North Carolina

== Competition Wins ==
- Pennsylvania Avenue at the White House, Washington, D.C., 2002 (completed)
- Lower Don Lands Design Competition, Toronto, 2007, (in progress)
- The City + The Arch + The River Competition, Gateway Arch National Park, St. Louis, Missouri, 2010 (to redesign the grounds around the Gateway Arch), (in progress)
- ARC Wildlife Crossing Competition (with HNTB), Denver, Colorado (in progress)
- Waller Creek Competition, Austin, Texas, (in progress)
