= Hand Drawn Pressing =

Vinyl record pressing company, Texas, United States

Hand Drawn Pressing was a vinyl record pressing company located in Addison, Texas, United States. It opened in 2016 as the world's first fully automated record pressing plant.

== History ==
Starting as Dallas-based record label Hand Drawn Records, Hand Drawn Pressing expanded into record brokering in 2011, simplifying the process for artists and pressing records through another record pressing plant. It eventually became independent from the record label by the name of Hand Drawn Pressing under chief creative officer Dustin Blocker and chief operating officer Alex Cushing in 2014. Acquiring two vinyl record presses in 2016, Hand Drawn Pressing began operations in a packaging warehouse.

== Technology ==
Hand Drawn Pressing used the WarmTone press engineered by Canada's Viryl Technologies. Before the introduction of the WarmTone press, all current record pressing facilities used machines exclusively resurfaced from the twentieth century. The resurfaced machines press an average of two records per minute. The WarmTone press averages three records per minute with a smaller percentage for error.

== See also ==
- Record press
- Production of phonograph records
