= Mel Chin =

American artist

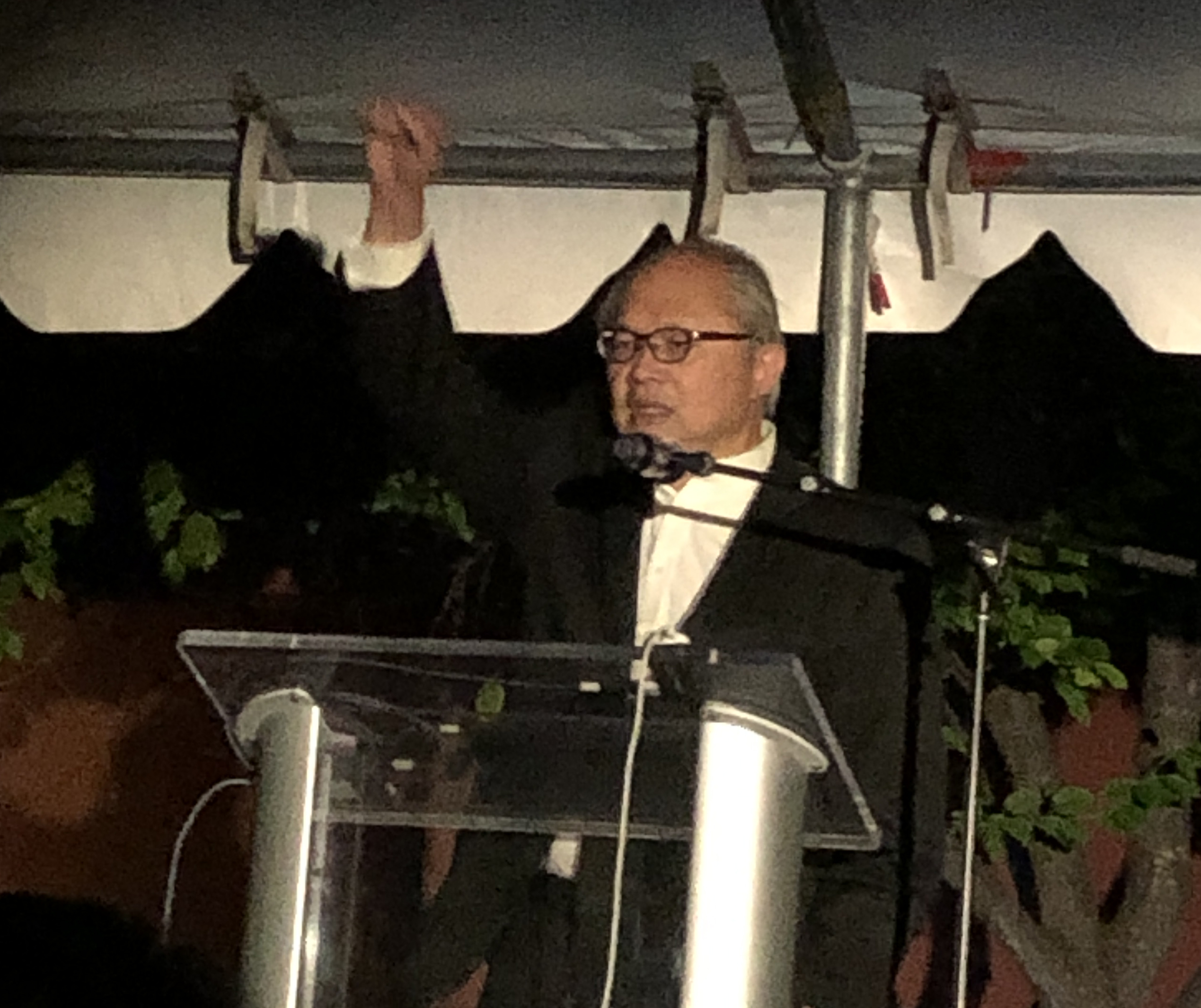
- Mel Chin in 2023 speaking in Santa Fe, NM
- Born: November 5, 1951 (age 75); Houston, Texas
- Education: Vanderbilt Peabody College of Education and Human Development
- Known for: Environmental art Social practice art Installation art
- Notable work: Revival Field
- Awards: MacArthur Foundation Grant; Guggenheim Grant

Mel Chin (born 1951 in Houston, Texas, USA) is a conceptual visual artist. Motivated largely by political, cultural, and social circumstances, Chin works in a variety of art media to calculate meaning in modern life. Chin places art in landscapes, in public spaces, and in gallery and museum exhibitions, but his work is not limited to specific venues. Chin once stated: "Making objects and marks is also about making possibilities, making choices—and that is one of the last freedoms we have. To provide that is one of the functions of art." His work may be found in the permanent collection of the National Gallery of Art in Washington, DC.

== Career ==
=== 1970s–1980s ===
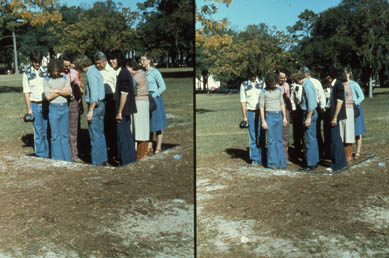
See/Saw: The Earthworks, 1976

In 1975, Chin graduated from Peabody College in Nashville, Tennessee. Shortly after, in 1976, Chin created See/Saw: The Earthworks for Hermann Park in Houston, Texas, where the artist manipulated two sections of the park's surface to create a kinetic, minimalist earthwork. In this mimic of a childhood pastime, Chin altered the landscape with an underground hydraulic device that allowed the participants to shift large sections of earth with their body weight. The title also questions the psychological perception of what is above and below a certain object's surface. This piece addressed three of the major art trends of the time: minimalism, conceptualism, and earthworks.

'The Manila Palm', sculpture by Mel Chin, Contemporary Arts Museum Houston, 1978

In 1983, Chin moved to New York City. He created MYRRHA P.I.A. (Post Industrial Age) (1984), site specific to Bryant Park. Commissioned by the Public Art Fund, the work was based on a Gustave Doré engraving depicting Myrrha in the 30th canto of Hell from Dante's Inferno. Chin created a three-dimensional figurative sculpture employing 19th century fabrication techniques, conjoined with space-age materials.

In 1989, Chin had a one-person exhibition at the Hirshhorn Museum in Washington, D.C. In The Operation of the Sun through the Cult of the Hand (1987), Chin addressed ancient Greek philosophy and Chinese philosophy. He investigated mythological constructions, and scientific information to contradict personal interpretations in the formulations of these works. Chin used nine planets of the Solar System to launch this elaborate construction. The installation comments on the origins of word material and form from East and West by drawing upon mythology, alchemy, and science in each culture.

Also in this exhibition were three major pieces with political content; The Extraction of Plenty from What Remains: 1823- (1989) is composed of two replicated White House columns that squeeze a cornucopia hand-crafted of mahogany, banana, mud, coffee, and goats' blood. In this artwork Chin reacted to the long history of American foreign policy that has fractured the ability of Latin American countries to prosper on their own. The date in the title 1823-(ongoing) is in reference to the Monroe Doctrine. The Sigh of the True Cross (1988) is based on a single string Ethiopian masinqo, or spike fiddle. Chin compounds the iconography of the musical instrument and the hammer and sickle to comment on famine, drought, failed politics, and foreign aid in the history of Ethiopia. The Opera of Silence (1988) is also complex and layered with meaning. An oversized Beijing opera drum rests on a staff made of human thigh bone, and the drum skins are woven into the emblem of the C.I.A. commenting on the interrelations of China, Tibet, and the C.I.A..

Chin conceptually developed the GALA Committee for the project called In the Name of the Place. In the Name of the Place covertly inserted art objects on the set of the prime-time television series Melrose Place. Chin claimed, "I realized that somewhere in those industries was where I wanted to develop this conceptual public art project. At the same time I was thinking of the virus as a paradigm for this art project. Viruses are self-replicating, but they mutate, and to me, that's like an art idea. I was wondering, how do you get an idea into a system, and let it replicate within that system? Using the virus as a model, how could I interact with television?""Syndicated television as a host can serve as a place for the generational transfer of an idea." The idea to make an impression upon prime time television worked—and the project successfully placed fine art into popular culture. Sotheby's in Los Angeles auctioned the objects with proceeds going to two educational charities.

=== 1990s–2000s ===
Degrees of Paradise, 1992

In 1992, Chin created Degrees of Paradise to be shown at the Storefront for Art and Architecture in New York City. Chin commissioned Kurdish weavers to create a 9 foot by 23 foot carpet with patterns based on satellite telemetry. This was installed in the ceiling of one triangular room. In a second similar-shaped room, overhead monitors projected active 3-D mathematically derived cloud patterns. The hand woven Turkish carpet juxtaposed with video monitors continued Chin's commentary of new and old digital traditions by paying homage to both. This project was a precursor to The State of Heaven (not realized). Chin envisioned a massive carpet 66 feet by 66 feet that would represent the entire atmospheric envelope with each knot equating 5 square miles (13 km^{2}). The carpet was to be destroyed and rewoven in a constant process according to the depletion or accretion of the ozone hole. This was an attempt to make visible a phenomenon that we normally cannot see.

After a series of successful gallery and museum exhibits, Chin abandoned object making to pursue an activist, ecological artwork. He began Revival Field in 1990. As a conceptual and scientifically grounded work Revival Field was developed with the intention of green remediation and ecological consciousness. In this landscape art project, Chin, with scientist, Dr Rufus Chaney, used plants called hyperaccumulators that are known for their ability to draw heavy metals from soil. Chin's project was located in the Pig's Eye Landfill in St. Paul, Minnesota for three years. Plot markers were placed to identify the individual plots. Inside them were Zinc, Copper, and Lead, all containing the correct ratios of the amount of metal in the soil. The project was not about the formal configuration but the conceptual realization of scientific process brought forth through art. Other Revival Field sites have been located in Palmerton, Pennsylvania and Stuttgart, Germany. This project materialized science, technology and art, while not adhering to the traditional object making of art.

Blueprints at Addison Circle is a steel sculpture located in Addison, Texas designed in conjunction landscape architect Michael Van Valkenburgh dedicated on April 13, 2000.

Chin was featured on the PBS series Art:21 - Art in the 21st Century where his pieces S.P.A.W.N. and KNOWMAD and Revival Field were highlighted. In S.P.A.W.N. Chin planned to reclaim abandoned buildings in the city of Detroit, Michigan. He looked at neglected homes that once thrived as a starting point for community development. KNOWMAD explored persecuted cultures and used traditional tribal woven rugs in an interactive computer video game. He developed this project collaboratively with computer software engineers, with the hope of shedding light upon forgotten cultures and forgotten people.

In 2004, Mel Chin was invited as a visiting artist at East Tennessee State University. While there, he completed the W.M.D. ("Warehouse of Mass Distribution"), which was driven to Houston, Texas in May, 2005, to participate in the Houston Art Car Parade.

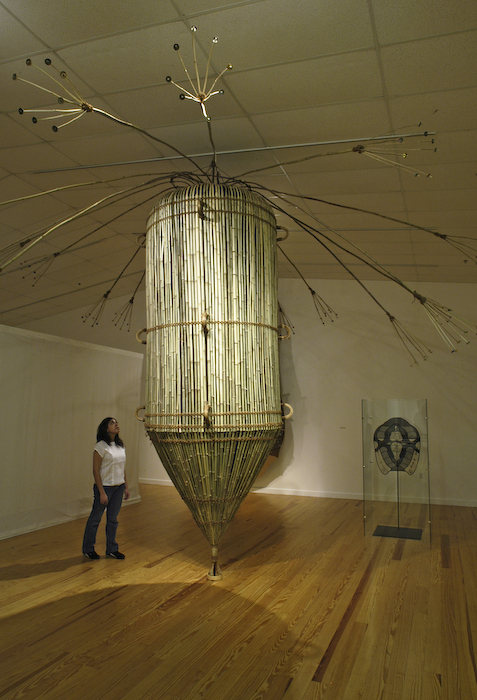
Our Strange Flower of Democracy, 2005

The Station Museum of Contemporary Art held a major exhibition in Houston, Texas (2006) entitled Do Not Ask Me. Prevailing themes that run through the work selected in this exhibition include war, social injustice, modern media, and individuality. Solo exhibitions of Chin's art have appeared the Walker Art Center, Minneapolis, MN, The Menil Collection, Houston, TX, Storefront for Art and Architecture, New York, and The Fabric Workshop and Museum, Philadelphia, PA.

In 2006 the Frederieke Taylor Gallery in New York City featured a selection of pieces from the "Do Not Ask Me" exhibit, originally shown at the Station Museum, as well as new drawings. Chin exhibited "KNOWMAD" as well as "Render" at Frederieke Taylor Gallery in 2000 and 2003.

9/11-9/11 (2006) is Chin's first animated film. Based on a graphic novella of the same name, which he wrote in 2002, it is a fictional love story set in Santiago, Chile, 1973 and New York City, 2001. Chin's film deals with the human impact of trauma and tragedy brought forth not by fate but by covert political machinations. Chin is the creator/director working with a 2-D, Chilean animation team.

In 2008 Chin proposed the idea of CLI- mate (climate linked individual- mate). CLI- mate is an app that is accessible in any language and free for its users. The idea is that it will personalize anyone's relationship with climate change. Users input their daily habits, the app combines their information with every single users and it calculates their impact on the planet. Users will be able to combine their faces with the worlds. The app is missing information on climate changes.

Chin is compelled to make art in spite of his dark world view which is in keeping with his philosophy of "taking action as resistance to insignificance."

Mel Chin has also exhibited in numerous group shows including the Fifth Biennial of Havana, Cuba; Seventh Architectural Biennial in Venice, Italy; Kwangju Biennale, Korea; Hirshhorn Museum, Washington D.C.; Museum of Contemporary Art, Los Angeles; the Whitney Museum of American Art; P.S.1 Contemporary Art Center; Museum of Modern Art; and the Asian American Arts Centre, New York City among others.

In 2006 Mel Chin visited New Orleans after hurricane Katrina to evaluate with fellow artists creative solutions to cure the aftermath of destruction as result of the storm. Chin began Operation Paydirt to find a solution for the high lead contimination in the soil of New Orleans, a problem that existed before Katrina. To assist the funding of Operation Paydirt, the Fundred Dollar Bill Project was implemented in schools across the United States to symbolically raise 300,000,000 dollars to propose to Congress for an exchange of real dollars in the Summer of 2010.

=== 2010s–present ===
Chin has been included in the Asian American Arts Centre's art Asia America digital archive. In 2018, Chin created work for Philadelphia Contemporary's Festival for the People, that also included works by artists Michel Auder, Erlin Geffrard and Rikrit Tiravanija.

Mel Chin's work was featured in the Spirit in the Land exhibition and catalog presented by the Nasher Museum of Art at Duke University and published by Duke University Press, respectively, in 2023. In 2024, the exhibition is traveling to the Pérez Art Museum Miami, Florida.

In 2024–25, Mel Chin participated in Breath(e): Toward Climate and Social Justice at the Hammer Museum, part of Getty's PST ART initiative. Curated by Glenn Kaino and Mika Yoshitake, the exhibition featured newly commissioned works by more than twenty artists addressing the climate crisis and social justice.

Mel Chin’s Pool of Light is a sculptural installation composed of approximately one hundred mid-century office chairs arranged into a monumental chandelier structure. Presented by PAC Public, it debuts in the Special Projects section of the inaugural Untitled Art fair in Houston from September 18–21, 2025.

== Awards ==
Mel Chin is the recipient of multiple awards including the US National Endowment for the Arts, New York State Council for the Arts, Art Matters, Creative Capital, and the Penny McCall, Pollock/Krasner, Joan Mitchell, Rockefeller and Louis Comfort Tiffany Foundations and Nancy Graves Foundation Award. He was a 2013 Artist-in-Residence at the McColl Center for Art + Innovation in Charlotte, NC. In 2010 he won a Fellow award granted by United States Artists. In 2010 Chin received the biennial Fritschy Culture Award from the museum Het Domein, Sittard the Netherlands. "The jury praises the unique way in which Chin, in many of his projects, creates a form of art in which participation and other forms of engagement are key. In awarding the Fritschy Culture Award 2010 to Mel Chin, the jury members emphasize the critical engaged nature of this prize and the expression of contemporary global issues." As part of the Fritschy Culture Award, Mel Chin exhibited a solo show at the museum Het Domein, titled "Disputed Territories". In 2019, Mel Chin was named a MacArthur Fellow.
