= Pentecostal Conference of North American Keralites =

Annual religious convention of Keralites

The Pentecostal Conference of North American Keralites (PCNAK) is an annual conference of Pentecostals of Keralite origin or from Kerala, India. The conference takes place annually in various cities of North America for the purpose of "mutual edification, fellowship and renewing friendships" PCNAK is reportedly the largest annual South Asian Christian conference in North America today with over 5,000 people in attendance.

== History ==
The first conference was held in 1983 at Oklahoma. List of the year and host city, state/province of PCNAK:

1. 1983 Oklahoma City, Oklahoma
2. 1984 Cape May, New Jersey / Dallas, Texas
3. 1985 Cleveland, Tennessee
4. 1986 Houston, Texas
5. 1987 Wayne, New Jersey
6. 1988 Chicago, Illinois
7. 1989 Dallas, Texas
8. 1990 Orlando, Florida
9. 1991 Cleveland, Tennessee
10. 1992 Toronto, Ontario
11. 1993 Syracuse, New York
12. 1994 Chicago, Illinois
13. 1995 Arlington, Texas
14. 1996 Knoxville, Tennessee
15. 1997 Lansing, Michigan
16. 1998 Houston, Texas
17. 1999 Somerset, New Jersey
18. 2000 Oklahoma City, Oklahoma
19. 2001 Long Beach, California
20. 2002 Atlanta, Georgia
21. 2003 Valley Forge, Pennsylvania
22. 2004 Virginia Beach, Virginia
23. 2005 Rochester, New York
24. 2006 Arlington, Texas
25. 2007 Orlando, Florida
26. 2008 Atlanta, Georgia
27. 2009 Chicago, Illinois
28. 2010 Houston, Texas
29. 2011 Oklahoma City, Oklahoma
30. 2012 Hamilton, Ontario
31. 2013 Hartford, Connecticut
32. 2014 Lansing, Michigan
33. 2015 Greenville, South Carolina
34. 2016 Addison, Texas
35. 2017 Columbus, Ohio
36. 2018 Springfield, Massachusetts
37. 2019 Miami, Florida
38. 2023 Lancaster, Pennsylvania (Postponed from 2020))
39. 2024 Houston, Texas (Postponed from 2021) (from next one on the conference will be every other year)
40. 2026 Chicago, Illinois

== PCNAK Youth ==
PCNAK Youth is the English stream of PCNAK and generally people age under 40 participates. The focus is on the spiritual well being of the young people as well as opportunity is created for sports and other activities. The Sports Day Tournaments include Men's Basketball, U-19 Basketball, Men's/Women's Volleyball, and other sports based on priority expressed interest of the community. more detailed information available in the history of the pentecostal movement.
