= Kaboom Town =

Annual fireworks show in Addison, Texas, U.S.

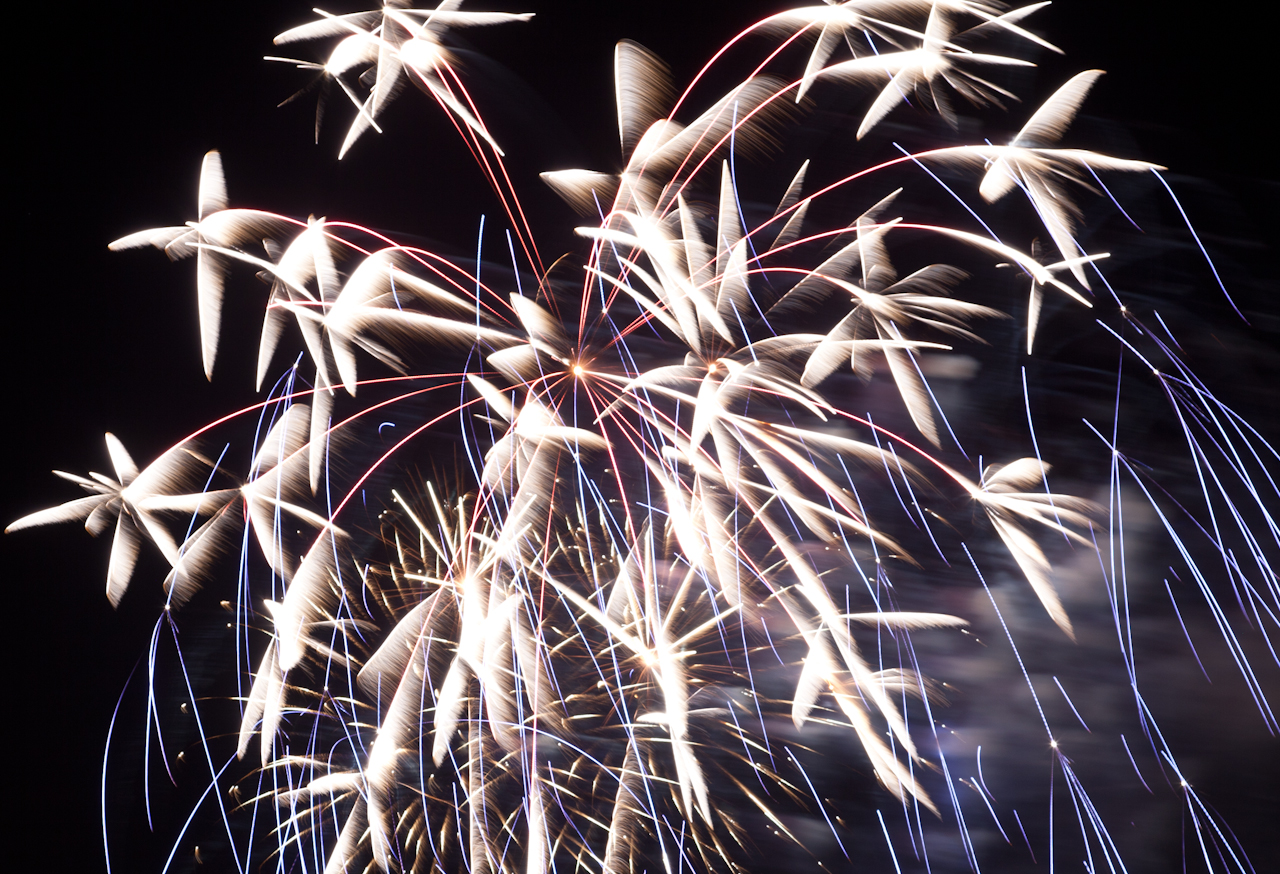
- Date: July 3
- Frequency: Annual
- Years active: 1985–2019, 2021– (41 years ago)
- Website: Addison Kaboom Town

Kaboom Town 2011

Kaboom Town!® is a nationally recognized fireworks show in Addison, Texas that takes place at Addison Circle Park every July 3 to celebrate the Independence of the United States. With over 400,000 visitors and 1,500 pounds of fireworks, it is the largest fireworks display in the Dallas–Fort Worth metroplex. The celebration features an air show, sponsored by the city's Cavanaugh Flight Museum and Addison Airport, which includes historic warplanes completing flyovers over the park.

Since 2014, the 30-minute pyrotechnics portion of the event has been organized and synchronized by Chad Stanley of Pyro Shows of Texas. It is recognized by the American Pyrotechnics Association as one of the top ten "must see" Fourth of July events in the nation.

In 2020, the in-person event was canceled due to the COVID-19 pandemic, but the fireworks display was live-streamed from an alternate location. The in-person events resumed in 2021.
