= Teardrop Park =

Public park in Manhattan, New York

Coordinates: 40°43′00″N 74°00′56″W

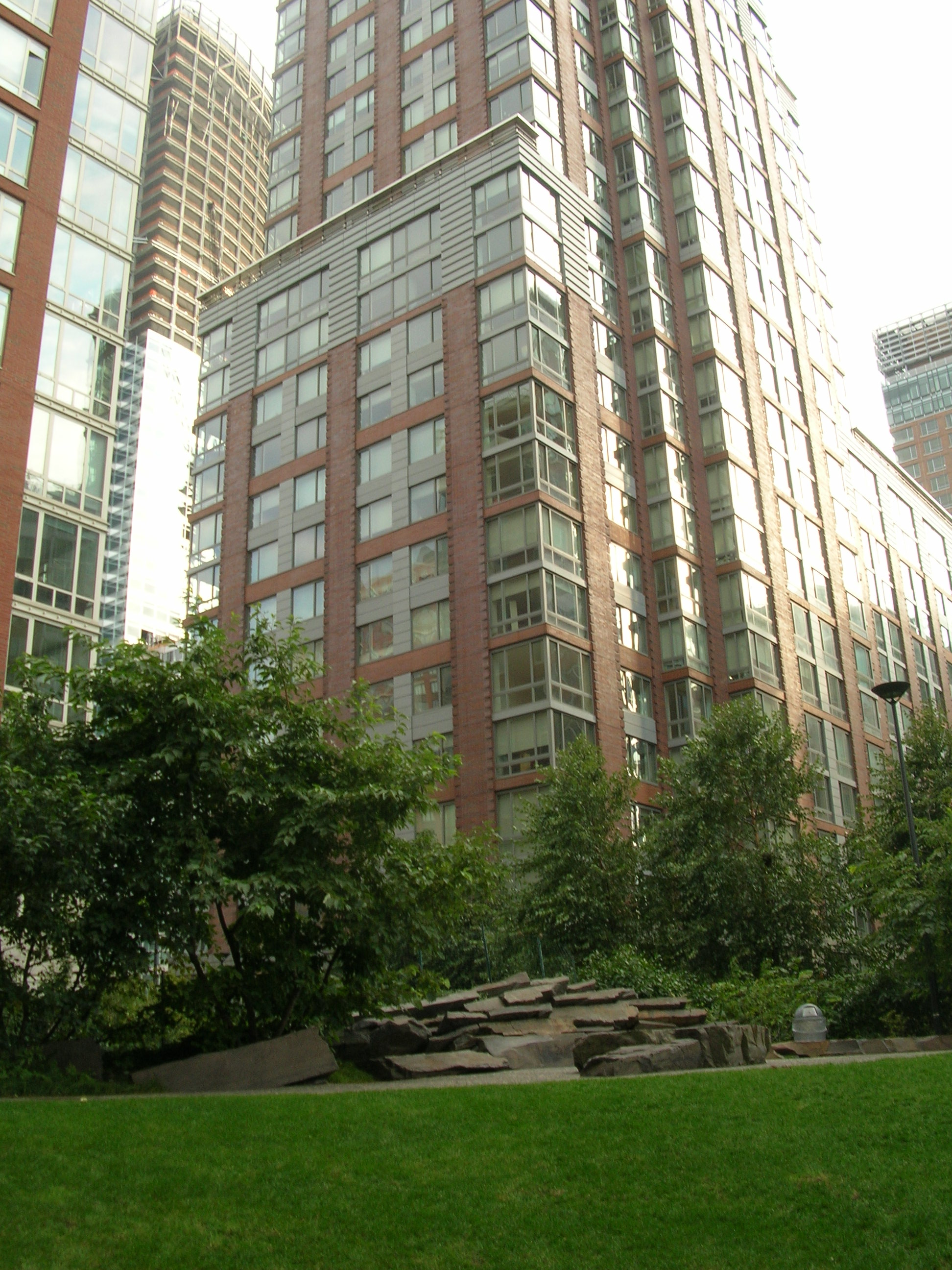
Teardrop Park

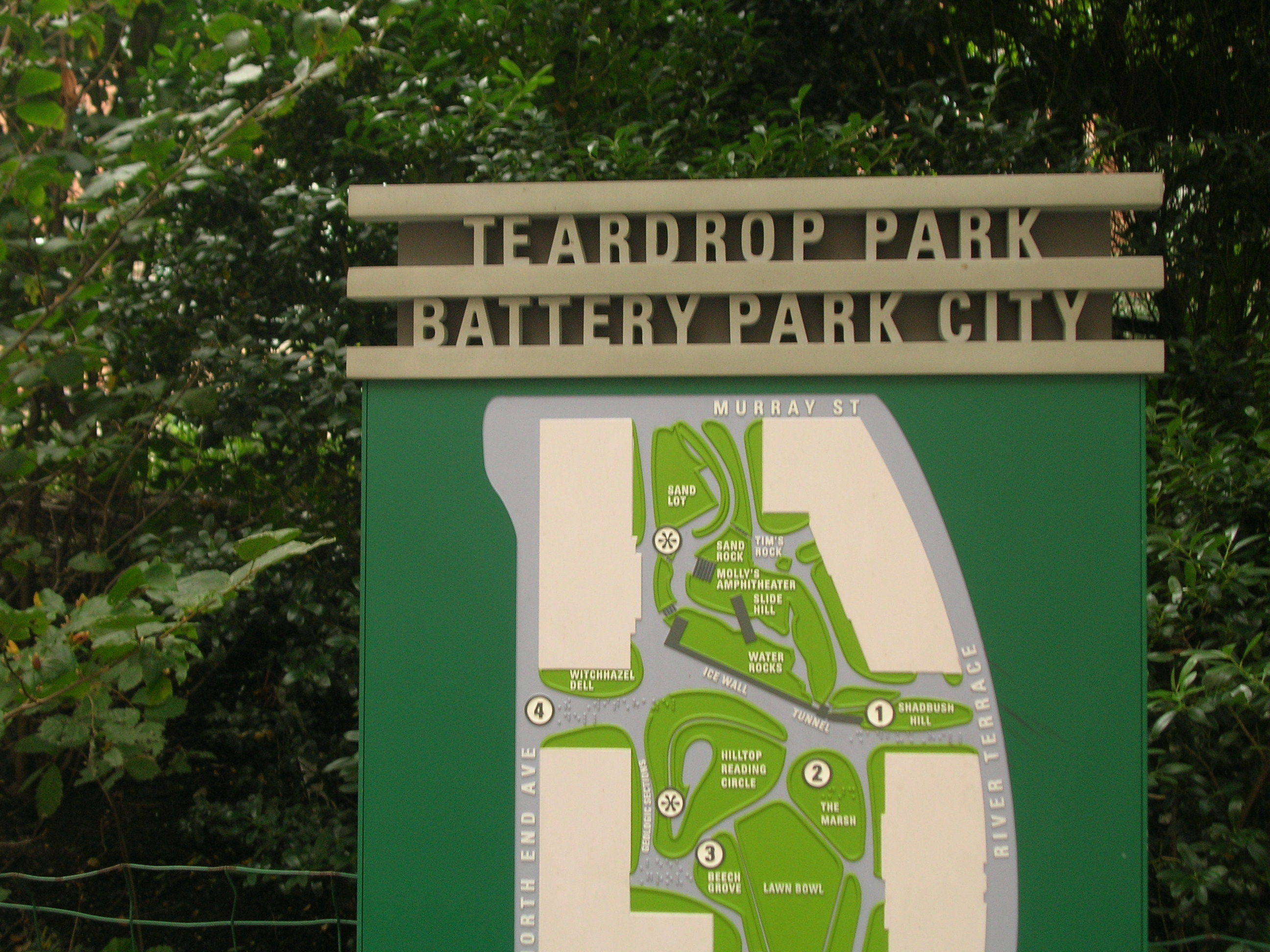
Map

Teardrop Park is a 1.8-acre (0.7 ha) public park in lower Manhattan, in Battery Park City, near the site of the World Trade Center. It was designed by Michael Van Valkenburgh Associates, a New York City landscape architecture firm. The park includes art designed for it by Ann Hamilton. The park sits between residential buildings toward the north end of Battery Park City at the corner of Warren Street and River Terrace. The creation of Teardrop Park is part of the ongoing construction of Battery Park City, a neighborhood on the southwest edge of Manhattan Island that was created in the 1970s by landfilling the Hudson River between the existing bulkhead and the historic pierhead line. Before construction, the site was empty and flat. The park was designed in anticipation of four high residential towers that would define its eastern and western edges. Although Teardrop Park is a New York City public park, the client for the park was the Battery Park City Authority, and maintenance is overseen by the Battery Park City Parks Conservancy.

The park opened on September 30, 2004, and is one of several in Battery Park City. It is east of Rockefeller Park, which has a popular playground with standard equipment, Teardrop Park was designed in collaboration with play experts from the Natural Learning Initiative to complement rather than replicate the existing play area. Teardrop's play elements are integrated into the landscape to allow city children to interact with natural materials such as water, plants, rock, and sand. Teardrop Park was praised for its use of natural plantings in a children's park. One article described the park as being crowded with children and parents, jampacked with experience, and offering a welcome naturalistic retreat from the city. Another critic said the park was barely used because it didn't offer enough things to do. A subsequent article, written by child development experts who helped design the park, said a study indicated that the park is well used, and "deserves to be praised as a successful public space. "

The shadier southern half of the site is an active play area featuring a long slide, two sand pits, "theatre steps" and a water playground. The northern half of the park is unprogrammed play space featuring a broad lawn, which is graded to catch the most light from the south, park benches, a small wetland play path, and a perched gathering area made from New York State rocks, an installation created by the artist Ann Hamilton. Dividing these two areas is a large rock wall, constructed from sedimentary rocks brought from elsewhere in New York State. The rocks are stacked to resemble a natural stratum and include a water source to allow icicles to form in the winter. A short tunnel connects the two areas, and is an homage to Frederick Law Olmsted and the tunnels he created within Central Park in New York City. Pathways criss-cross the site, providing elevated views within the park and beyond as well as urban connections across the park. The park was designed in accordance with Battery Park City's Green Guidelines. Sustainable initiatives include reusing gray water collected from the surrounding buildings in the irrigation of the park as well as the selection of sustainable construction materials. The plantings of Teardrop Park are designed to thrive on a relatively shady site and provide habitat for native and migratory birds. The soils of the park are designed to support plant life without the use of chemical fertilizers, pesticides, herbicides, or fungicides.

With construction beginning in 2008 and completion projected in 2009, Teardrop Park was expanded across Murray Street to the south. The design of Teardrop South was also by Michael Van Valkenburgh Associates and it continued certain themes from the original park. The new portion of the park addressed its heavily shaded microclimate by installing three 8-foot-diameter (2.4 m) heliostats, or solar mirrors, that reflect the sun from the top of a residential apartment building in Battery Park City. The mirrors were designed by Carpenter Norris Consulting.

== Awards ==
- American Society of Landscape Architects: 2009 Professional Awards
