= Blueprints at Addison Circle =

Outdoor sculpture in Addison, Texas

- Artist: Michael Van Valkenburgh and Mel Chin
- Year: 2000
- Type: steel
- Dimensions: 13 m × 43 m (43 ft × 140 ft)
- Location: Addison, Texas; 32.96140°N 96.82594°W

Blueprints at Addison Circle is a steel sculpture located in Addison, Texas officially unveiled on April 13, 2000. It is one of approximately 20 works of public art throughout the town.

Addison Circle and the surrounding area was built in 1997 to create a more traditional walkable urban town center; it is a 133-foot-diameter (41 m) roundabout. The sculpture inside the traffic circle consists of 25 poles and five panels. It weighs 410,000 pounds (190,000 kg) and required 650 US gallons (2,500 L) of custom "Sharpie blue" paint. The work is more than 4 stories high and 140 feet (43 m) across. It was designed by artist Mel Chin in conjunction with landscape architect Michael Van Valkenburgh and with the aid of LeMessurier Consultants, and was fabricated and erected by Big D Metalworks of Dallas. The poles weighing 9,000 pounds (4,100 kg) were made in Houston, Texas and the tapered cones at the top of the poles were made in New Jersey. Total cost for the sculpture was $2.1 million. The nighttime lighting was designed by Stephen Bernstein of Cline Bettridge Bernstein Lighting Design.

The sculpture is said to resemble the branching pattern of a grove of oak trees. The panels follow a design using actual blueprints from Addison's municipal buildings, parks, bridges, and water pumping facilities. Of the work Chin said “I chose to represent in this the physical representation of blueprints, the infrastructure that you don’t see—and to celebrate the ideas floating above you.”

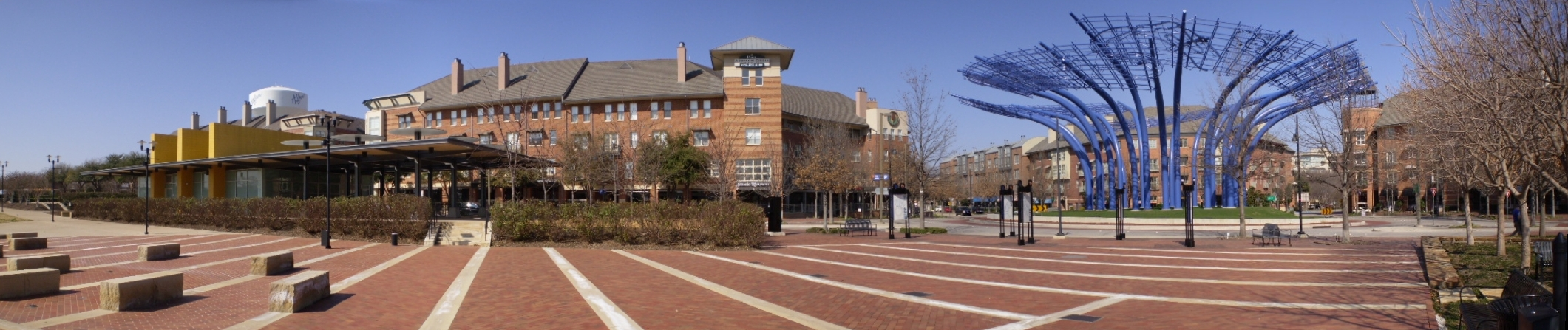
Addison Circle Park Pavilion and Blueprints
