= Kraus Campo =

Roof garden in Pittsburgh

Coordinates: 40.44142°N 79.94243°W

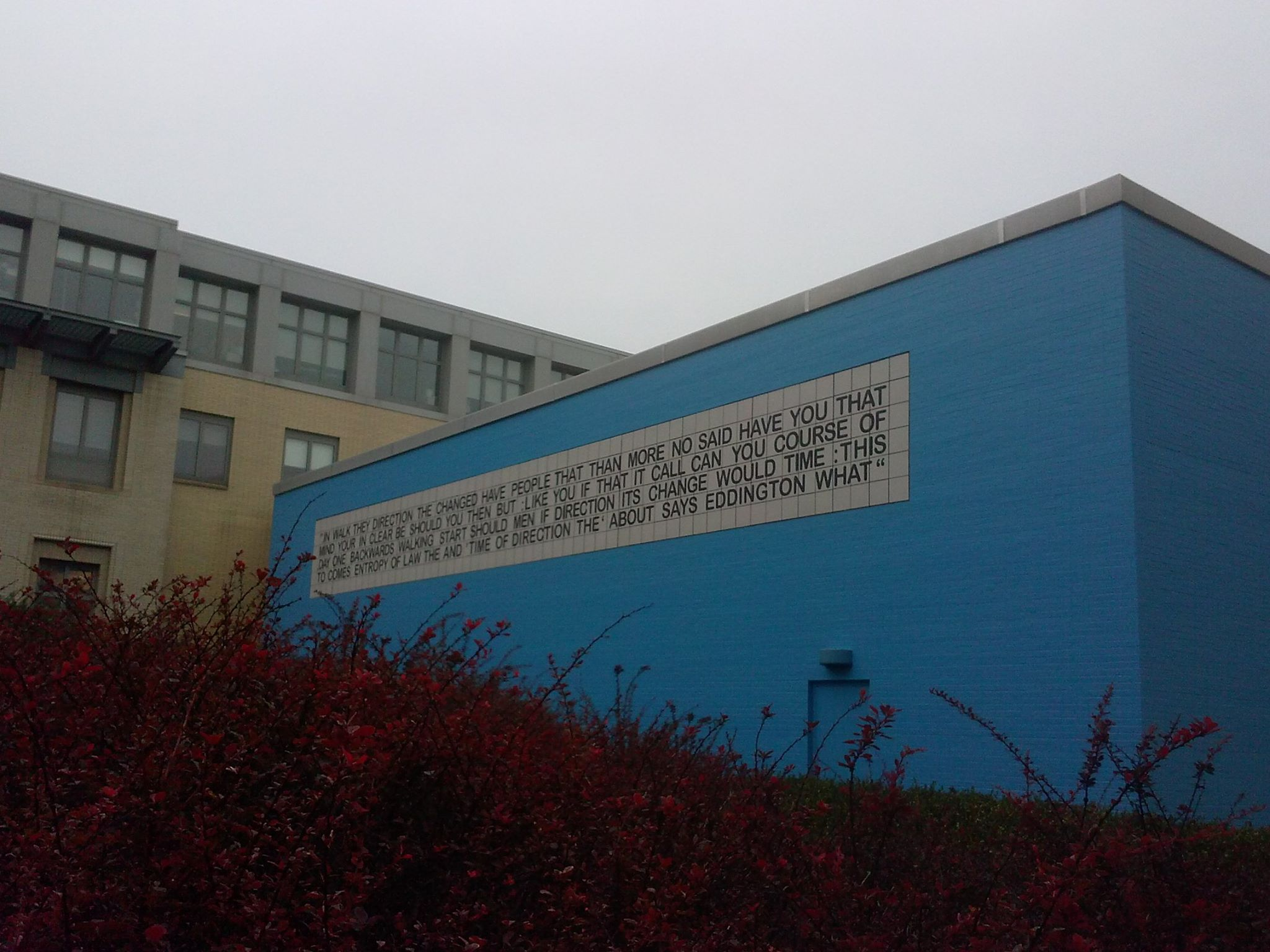
The Kraus Campo

Kraus Campo is a roof garden and landscape design space in Pittsburgh, Pennsylvania. It is located on the roof of the Posner Center on the Carnegie Mellon University campus, between the College of Fine Arts building and Posner Hall. The Campo was designed and created by artist Mel Bochner and landscape architect Michael Van Valkenburgh. The Campo consists of orange pathways surrounded by various species of shrubs, a central seating area, and a quotation tiled onto the back wall. It was commissioned by and named after Jill Gansman Kraus, a university trustee, and her husband Peter Kraus.

The Campo cost approximately $4 million and was inaugurated in fall 2004. An exhibition at the Miller Gallery displayed working models, unrealized elements and related works by both artists.

== Design ==
The Greek concept of an agora as a marketplace of ideas and the city of Siena, Italy, were the main inspirations for the Campo's design.

The center of the garden contains a 25-by-60-by-3-foot (7.62 by 18.29 by 0.91 m), tile-covered sculpture shaped like a French curve. This curve is called the "campo", and is intended to be used as a seating area. The surface of the curve is tiled with random numbers. Shrubbery in the Campo include evergreen boxwoods, azaleas, semi-dwarf red level Japanese barberry, ilex, and ivy.

The exposed wall of the GSIA Building (formerly home to the Tepper School of Business) was painted blue and has a quotation by Ludwig Wittgenstein, displayed with the words in reversed order, in black and white porcelain tiles. The quotation concerns the arrow of time and is displayed as follows:

”.IN WALK THEY DIRECTION THE CHANGED HAVE PEOPLE THAT THAN MORE NO SAID HAVE YOU THAT MIND YOUR IN CLEAR BE SHOULD YOU THEN BUT :LIKE YOU IF THAT IT CALL CAN YOU COURSE OF .DAY ONE BACKWARDS WALKING START SHOULD MEN IF DIRECTION ITS CHANGE WOULD TIME :THIS TO COMES ENTROPY OF LAW THE AND 'TIME OF DIRECTION THE ABOUT SAYS EDDINGTON WHAT“
