= Mill Race Park =

Park in Columbus, Indiana

Coordinates: 39.204569°N 85.926671°W

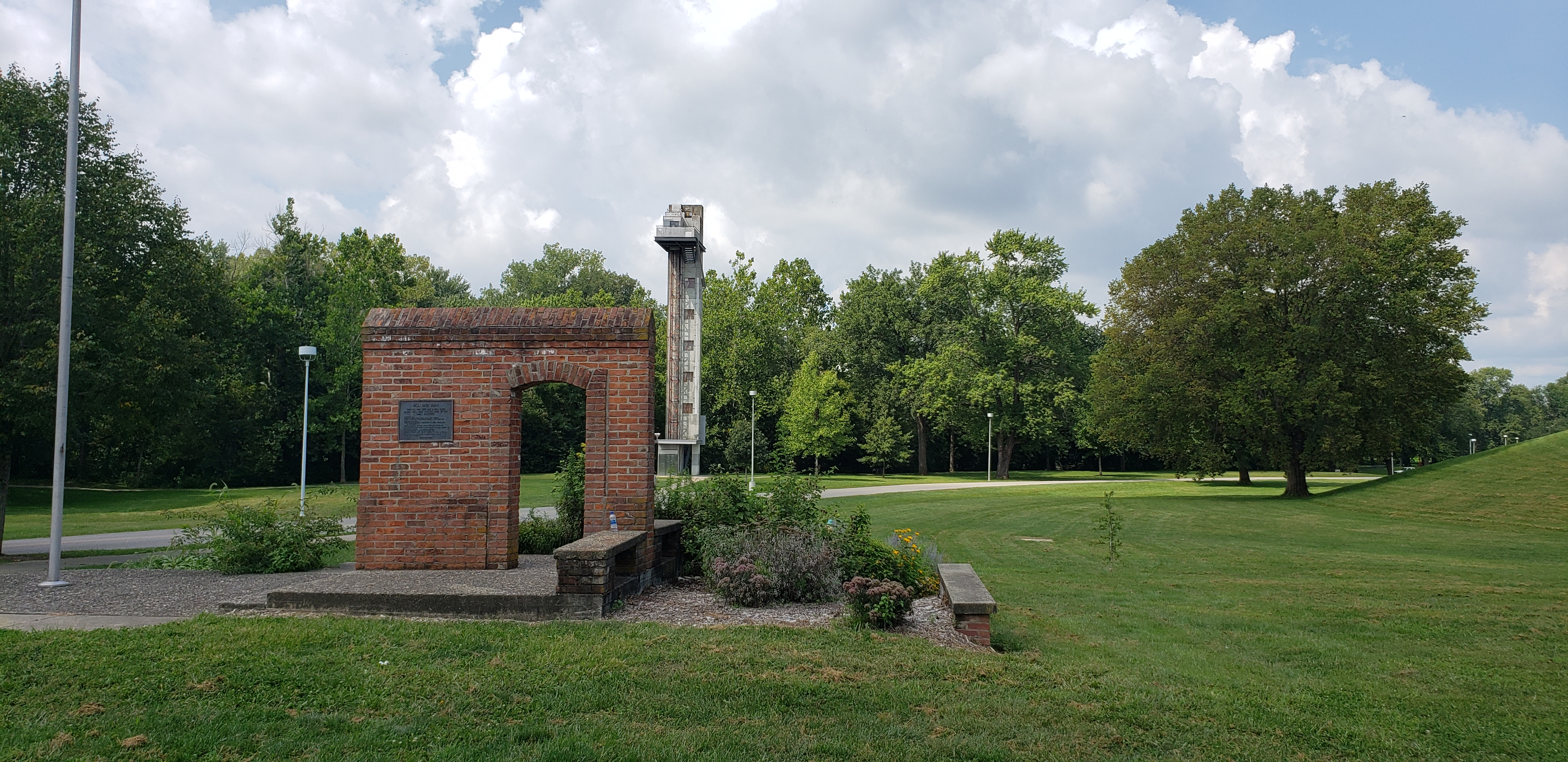
Entrance to Mill Race Park.

Mill Race Park is a city-owned park located in Columbus, Indiana (Bartholomew County), where the Flat Rock and the Driftwood rivers join (forming the east fork of the White River) in downtown Columbus.

== History ==
Historically, Mill Race Park was an impoverished area of Columbus. During the 1930s through the early 1960s the area was plagued by rodents, disease and sub-standard housing. Located in a flood plain the homes were prone to flooding, creating an inhospitable place to live; the area became known as "Death Valley". In 1963, the park site was purchased by the city and cleaned up, transforming it into the first iteration of Mill Race Park (originally called Tipton Park).

In November 1974, a rash of sightings of an unknown monstrous creature similar to Bigfoot occurred in Mill Race Park, where it attacked cars and frightened many people, causing many people to visit the park in hopes of catching it or a glimpse leading police (who otherwise considered the monster to be a hoax) to shut the park down. The monster was featured in an episode of Monsters and Mysteries in America, where witness Tyra Cataline came forward on it.

In the late 1980s a redesign and update was awarded to Michael Van Valkenburgh Associates, resulting in the completion of the current design of Mill Race Park in 1993.

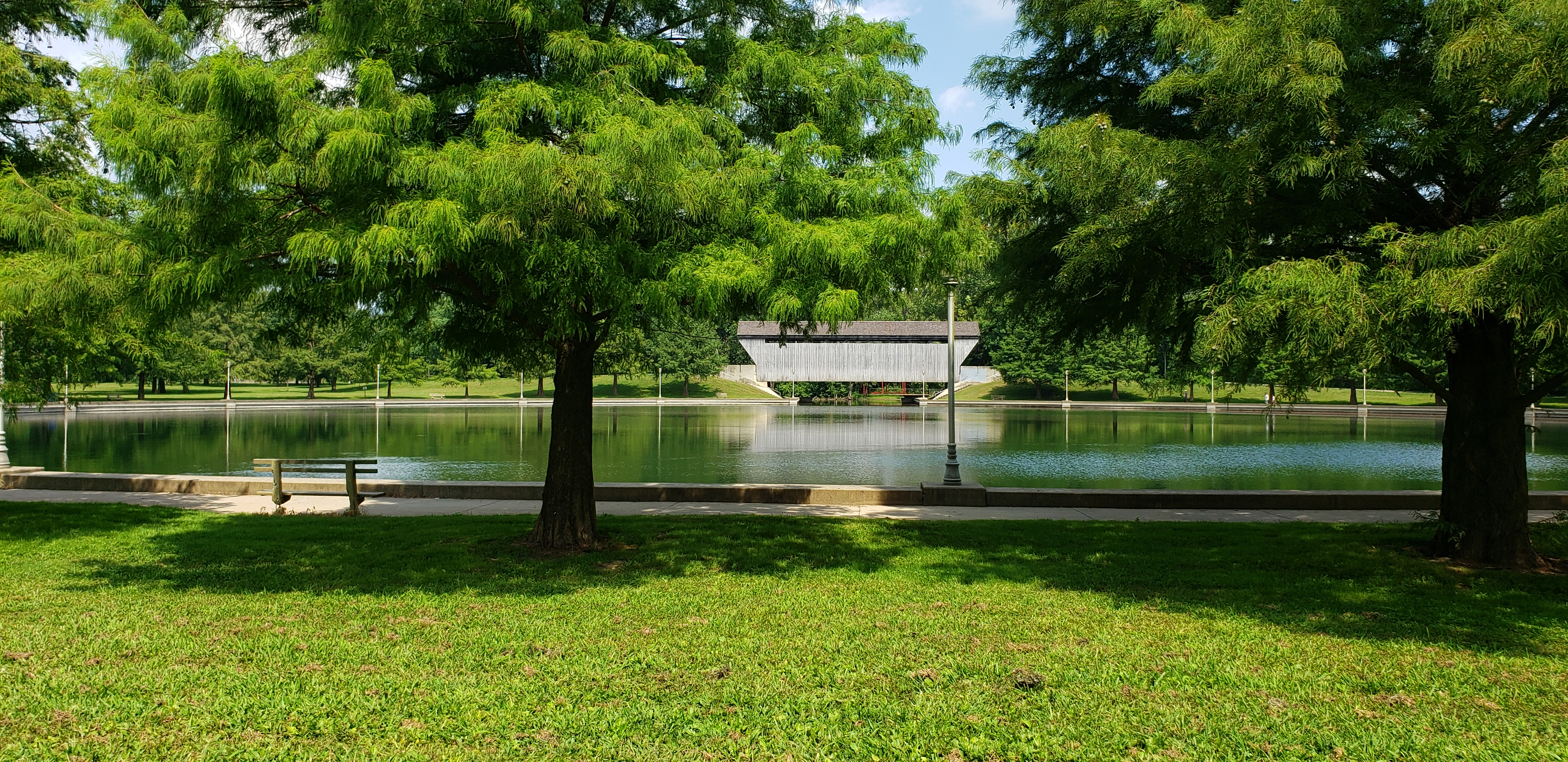
Covered bridge in Mill Race Park.

== Features ==
Mill Race park is composed of 83 acres (340,000 m^{2}) including a playground and an 84 ft (26 m) observation tower. The land is subject to severe annual flooding, during which sixty percent of the park is under water. The site features a loop road around the perimeter of the park, path systems, and two small lakes connected by a wooden bridge.

Key design features include a circular lake to contrast the soft natural curves of the surrounding river. The circular lake is defined by a masonry walk at its perimeter and surrounded by flowering trees. An earthen amphitheater, inspired by Native American earthworks found in the Ohio River Valley, is located at the end of a broad field, and forms a crest of land that remains above the water during floods. The covered bridge harkens back to the local history of numerous covered bridges found across the landscape.

The park also offers fishing, basketball courts, and the People Trail. An interpretive boardwalk that ties the existing park wetland to a path system that continues into the surrounding community. Access to the park is provided by a loop road and the introduction of a river walk. Additionally the park is home to numerous events, festivities, and programs throughout the year.

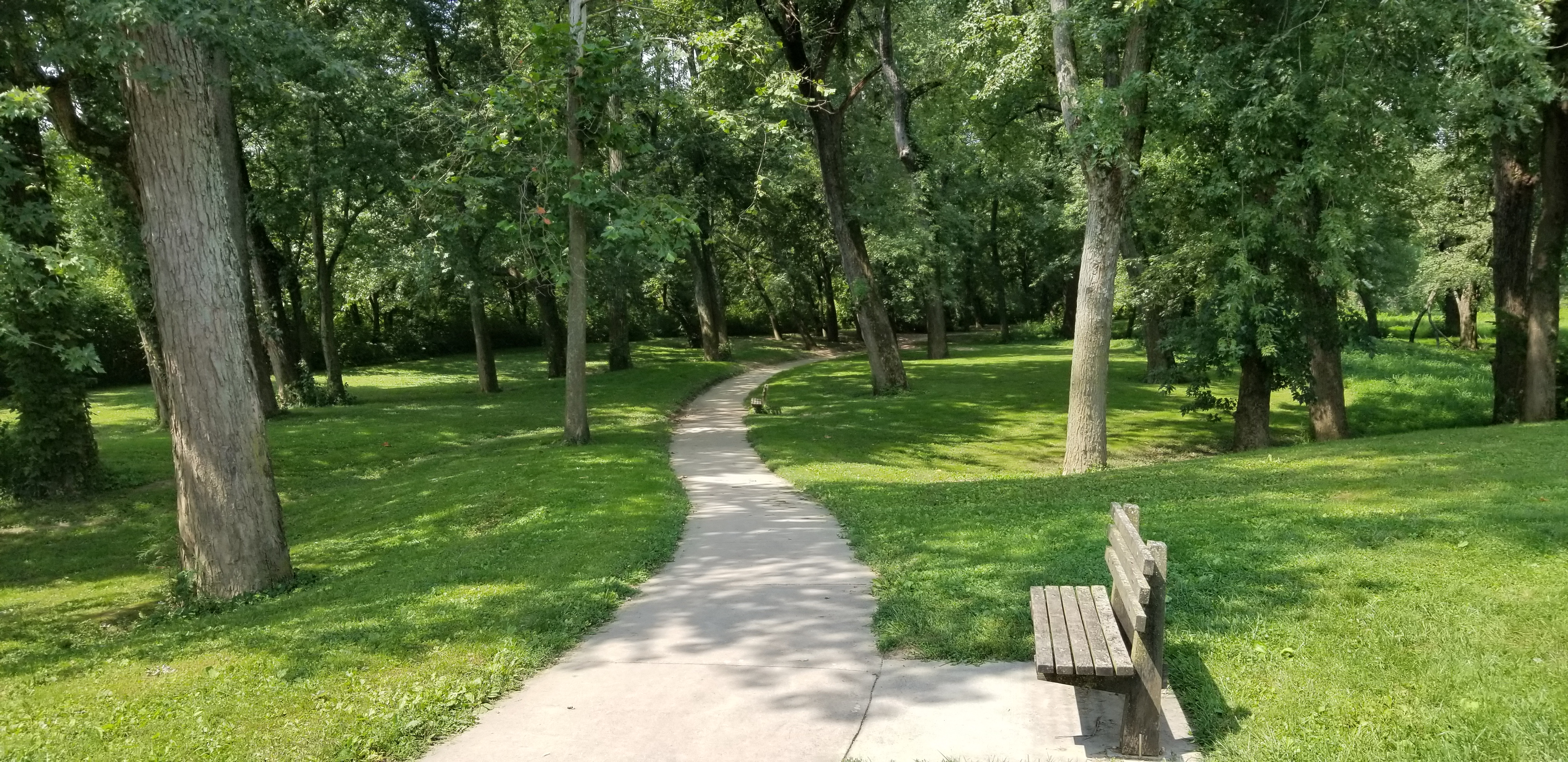
Path in Mill Race Park.

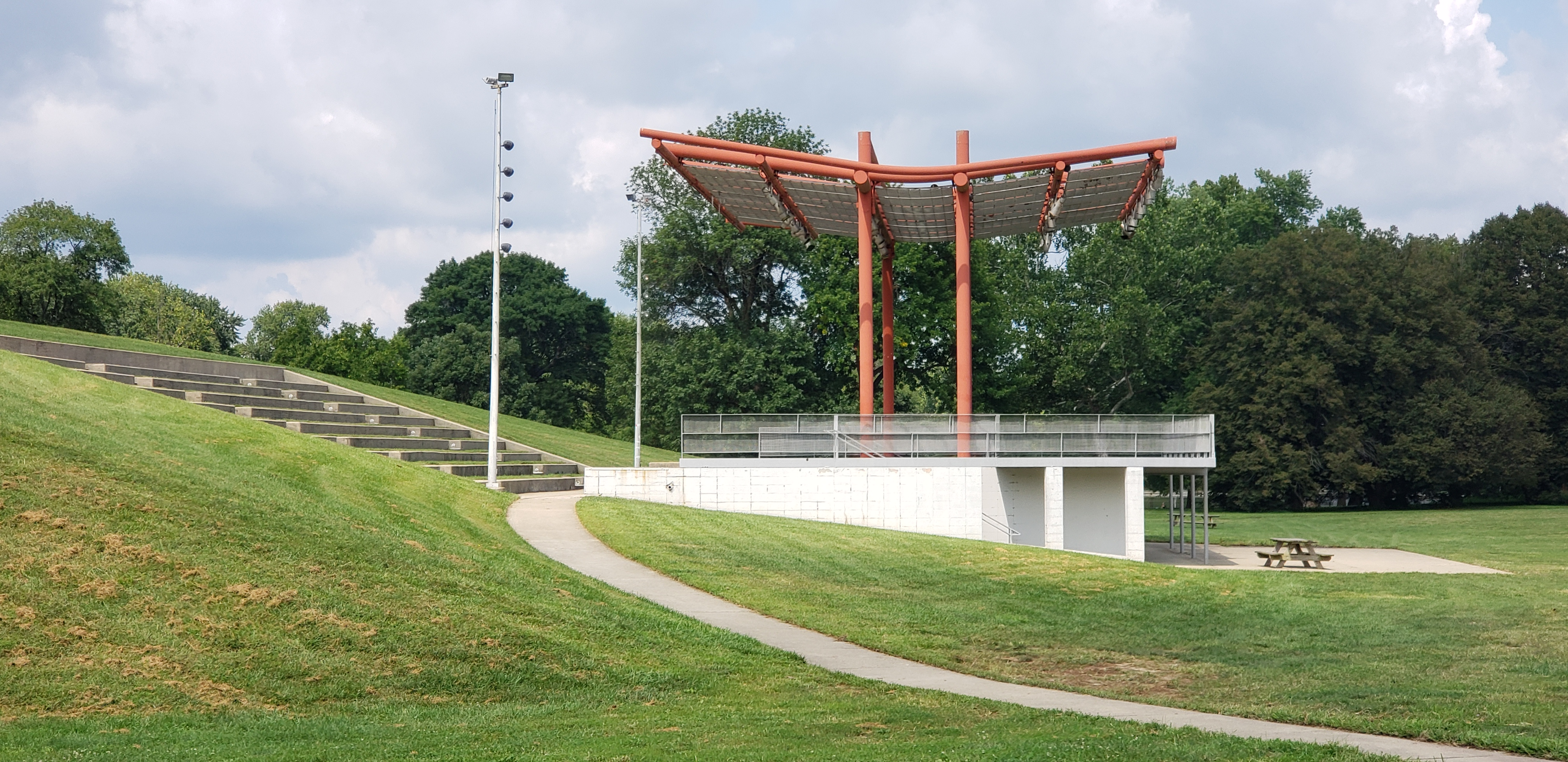
Amphiteater in Mill Race Park.
