= Ann Hamilton (artist) =

American visual artist

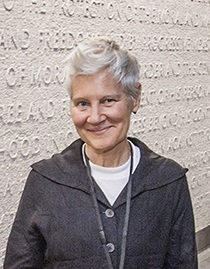
- Born: Lima, Ohio, U.S.
- Education: University of Kansas, Lawrence, KS – BFA in Textile Design; Yale University, New Haven, CT – MFA in Sculpture
- Known for: Installation; textiles; sculpture; video; performance; photography; printmaking
- Movement: Installation art

Ann Hamilton (born 1956) is an American visual artist who emerged in the early 1980s, known for her large-scale multimedia installations. After receiving her BFA in textile design from the University of Kansas in 1979, she lived in Banff, Alberta, and Montreal, Quebec, Canada before deciding to pursue an MFA in sculpture at Yale in 1983. From 1985 to 1991, she taught on the faculty of the University of California at Santa Barbara. Since 2001, Hamilton has served on the faculty of the Department of Art at the Ohio State University. She was appointed a Distinguished University Professor in 2011.

== Personal life ==
Ann Hamilton was born in Lima, Ohio. She attended St. Lawrence University from 1974 to 1976; University of Kansas, BFA in Textile Design, 1979; Yale School of Art, MFA in Sculpture, 1985. Currently she resides in Columbus, Ohio, with her husband Michael Mercil, also an artist.

== Themes and inspiration ==
Hamilton in 2019

Though Hamilton studied textile design throughout her undergraduate career, she pointedly decided to focus on sculpture instead of weaving as a concentration in graduate school. She claims that, when making that decision, she was “interested in the relationships between things in space. And more important than the things themselves is the way they come into relation.” While in Canada, and while teaching at UC Santa Barbara, Hamilton began creating an interdisciplinary art with textiles "weaved" with photography and performance; often resulting in different elements combined in an image or includes textiles like pressed shirts or work uniforms.

In addition to her educational background. She identifies herself as a reader: of space, of objects, of literary criticism, of poetry, and even of dictionaries; thus, the act of reading, words, and books often make their way into her installations, videos, and created objects. Her work also explores themes of humanity, from gender and the body to suffering and power. As a conceptual artist working with video, sound, and interactive installation, the elements of time, change, and decay also play roles in her work. Hamilton's installations are meant to be experienced with all the senses, often incorporating elements like sound and smell that urge the viewer to connect with and engage the work on a multi-sensory level. Her works also often respond to the spaces and cities in which they are created, using objects that reflect the history and identity of the culture.

== Select works ==
=== 1984–1990 ===
suitably positioned

One of Hamilton's first installations, suitably positioned, 1984, set the tone for her later works, encompassing many of her artistic methods: installation, object-making, photography, and performance. For this piece, she constructed a suit made of a men's thrift-store suit and toothpicks. She then stood, wearing the suit, for the duration of the installation within the studio with viewers walking around the artist without interacting with her. The suit was originally made as a part of a work titled room in search of a position, which, after exhibition, Hamilton believed didn't reach pictorial success and decided to rethink her use of these made objects. However, Hamilton later incorporated the toothpick suit into an installation titled suitably positioned, which finally created a connection between the object, a suit, and the figure, herself within the suit. This installation was directly associated with her body object series.

body object series

While working on suitably positioned, Hamilton began to think about her subject matter differently, hoping to create an installation that "demonstrates a relation instead of making a picture of a relation." This thinking led Hamilton to begin creating her body object series, a collection of photographs first produced in 1984 with further editions produced in 1987, 1994, and 2006. Working with photographer Bob McMurtry on the series, Hamilton shot photographs of herself wearing constructed objects like her toothpick suit. The coverings of the body in these photographs represent what Hamilton calls, "the articulation of the self at the boundaries of the body."

privation and excesses

In San Francisco, Hamilton exhibited privation and excesses as a part of the Capp Street Project in 1989. The artist used $7,500 worth of pennies to cover a large portion of the gallery floor stuck to the surface by a thin coating of honey. In a chair on the edge of the field of honey and pennies, a figure (sometimes the artist herself) sat, wringing their hands in a hat full of honey.

palimpsest

In collaboration with Kathryn Clark, the palimpsest installation was part of a group exhibition at The New Museum of Contemporary Art, New York, "Strange Attractors: Signs of Chaos" in 1989. The installation was organized into two zones, one that demonstrated memory lost and the other memory experienced. The first was in the museum's street-side window-display space, whose back and side walls were covered with block-printed texts, using shoe polish as ink. On a tall stool, under a broken strand of nichrome wire, a felt hat sat upended covered in beeswax and graphite. The second part of the installation was a room that visitors could enter, filled with the scent of beeswax and the sound of paper fluttering. The inner walls of the enclosed space were covered with small pieces of faded newsprint with handwritten memories, each attached with a single tack, constantly rustling from a fan affixed above the doorway. In the center of the room stood a vitrine made of steel and glass, inside which there were two cabbages, reminiscent of cerebral hemispheres, being devoured by a colony of snails.

=== 1991–2000 ===
indigo blue

indigo blue, one of Hamilton's best-known works was first exhibited in a garage near the public market in Charleston, South Carolina, in 1991. She created the piece as a commissioned work as a part of the Places with a Past exhibition within the Spoleto Festival, in which artists chose a site and responded to both the historical and current context of the city. The installation was an homage to labor, respectfully commenting on and remembering the process of manual work through sculptural elements like a pile of 47,000 blue work uniforms and sacks full of soybeans hanging on a wall. Behind the stacked uniforms, a writer sat at another table, applying an eraser and saliva to small, blue-covered books, working one by one from back to front to remove the writing within, leaving the eraser shavings to accumulate within the books throughout the duration of the installation. This action of erasing the past served as another memory of labor, and the names embroidered on the shirts echoed the history of the laborers living in the city. The back wall held the hanging bags of soybeans that slowly spilled and began to sprout from the humid air within the space, calling attention to the atmosphere of South Carolina. The title of the exhibition, as well as the incorporation of blue objects, likewise referenced Charleston's history and indigo's economic significance as a plant and dye in the city. The work was later acquired and exhibited by the San Francisco Museum of Modern Art in 2007.

tropos

In 1993 she performed her piece tropos at Dia Center for the Arts. The Greek word tropos indicates a turn, physically or figuratively. For the art piece, Hamilton covered the entire warehouse floor with varying colored interwoven horse hair. She sat at a small table, located in the middle of the room. While sitting at the table, she studiously burned each word from a book with an electric heated coil.

Allegheny Riverfront Park

(1993–2001) Between this time period, numerous designers and artists including Ann Hamilton came together to create a new park design for Allegheny Riverfront Park in Pittsburgh, Pennsylvania. This park would include a lower level that would be thirty five feet wide and nearly a mile long, as well as an upper level that would travel along Fort Dusquesne Boulevard. While knowing that the city had traffic, the artists wanted to keep true to the busy city aspect as well as create beauty in nature. They would create a board walk with trees following all the way down, stone edge that would be used as places to sit, overall the artists intended to create a peaceful place with a beautiful view of the city.

=== 2001–2010 ===
the picture is still

This video was exhibited in Taura, Japan in 2001. To create the video, Hamilton used a small surveillance camera positioned very near a black-and-white photograph of her son, over which she moved her hand in a continuous, slow motion. Because of the camera's position, the small lens, and the movement of her hand, which she calls "hand-seeing," the image in the video is often abstract and out of focus, a blur of mouths and noses. The artist claims that the movement illustrates that "the picture is still...as in not moving...but also as in 'still here'...the way history haunts and inhabits the present."

human carriage

The Solomon R. Guggenheim Museum's 2009 exhibition The Third Mind invited various American artists to contemplate and represent the ways in which Asian literature, art, and philosophy are incorporated into, changed by, and transform American cultural trajectories. Hamilton participated in the exhibition, creating an installation entitled human carriage. The artist's installation reflected her interests in humanity, language, text, and physical material and referenced the movement and transmission of cultural information and identity through the use of books and a manual mechanism of travel. The artist tied together cross-sections of book volumes, which she called "book weights," that were stored in piles at the top of the museum. The book weights were then attached to a pulley system "carriage" operated by a "reader" at the top of the museum who manually returned the carriage to the bottom of the rotunda where the bound books accumulated in a pile. Along the building's existing spiral ramps, Hamilton also constructed a spiraling pipe that acted as a travel mechanism for a smaller bell carriage that housed Tibetan cymbals. Prior to each book weight's descent, the "reader" released this bell carriage so that it slid along the pipe, filling the space with ringing as it spiraled through the rotunda before meeting the books at the end of the ramp.

=== 2011–2018 ===
the event of a thread

In 2012, Hamilton exhibited her installation the event of a thread at the Park Avenue Armory in New York City. The installation featured a white curtain punctuated by large swings that spanned the 55,000 square feet of space. The installation, like many of Hamilton's works, changed over time, involving the audience in an interconnected, multi-sensory experience of space. For this installation, the artist involved the use of radios in paper bags that were available for viewers to carry around; the audio on these radios was broadcast by two actors from the theater company SITI who read selections of text by various authors at one end of the room. On the other end, a writer sat at a desk, writing sentences. The artwork changed day to day; the murmurs, cell phone rings, and laughs of the viewers, as well as the sounds of reading, writing, and cooing pigeons, while the viewers’ swinging swayed the curtain. The audience was able to interact the space in ways such as: swinging, looking in through a window, lying on the ground, or walking through the exhibition.

the common S E N S E

Hamilton was commissioned by museum director Sylvia Wolf to create new works for a museum-wide exhibition at the Henry Art Gallery in Seattle called the common S E N S E. Hamilton drew from collections at the Burke Museum of Natural History and Culture and holdings in the University of Washington Libraries Special Collections to create an exhibition about animals, the commonalities we share with animals, and our uses to animals.

Cortlandt Street subway station project

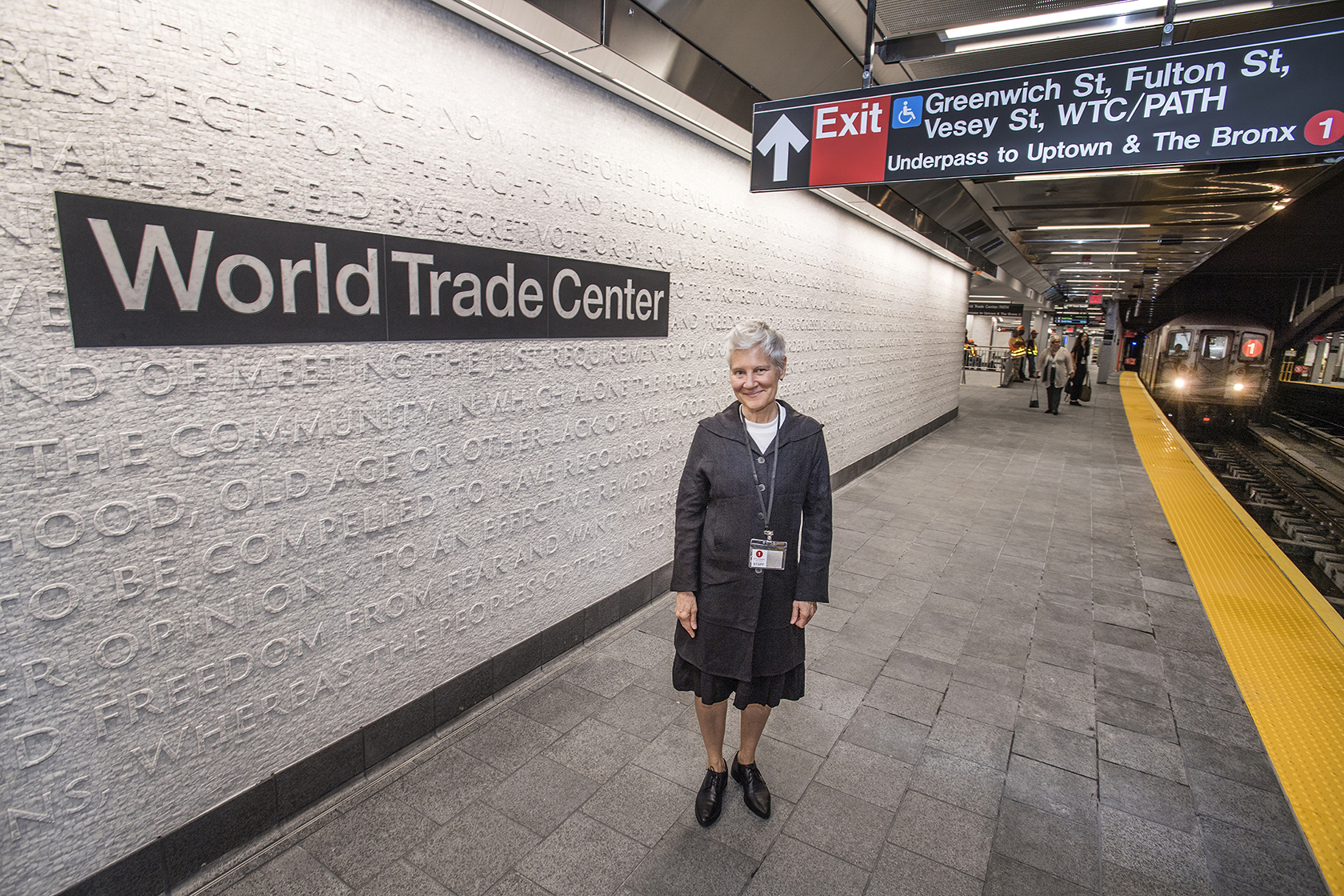

The New York City Metropolitan Transportation Authority Arts and Design Program commissioned Hamilton to create an art project as a part of the reconstruction of Manhattan's Cortlandt Street subway station that was destroyed on September 11, 2001. This project, to be completed by 2018, is similar to her previous work, VERSE, in that it weaves together words, but in this specific case uses texts from notable historical documents like the Declaration of Independence and the Universal Declaration of Human Rights. The text is white and appears upon or within the surface of the white walls of the station, covering up to 70 percent of the walls' surface. As in much of her work, Hamilton intends this project to be experienced rather than simply viewed. Intended for each person travelling through the station to have a different relationship with these words.

O N E E V E R Y O N E

Hamilton photographs numerous different people of all different races and ethnicity through a semi-transparent membrane or window. The only time the view could see an image clearly was when the person would touch the membrane. On two opposite sides, Hamilton would instruct the subject to move how she wanted, solely relying on her voice to instruct them. Hamilton feels as if this relates to the medical field in always waiting for answers, check ups, and having a semi blinded sense of what is going on and just relying on a voice, no physical person.

== Select exhibitions ==
Hamilton has exhibited around the world, including:

- The Museum of Contemporary Art, Los Angeles (1988)
- Dia Center for the Arts, New York (1993)
- Tate Gallery, Liverpool (1994)
- The Museum of Modern Art, New York (1994)
- The Art Institute of Chicago (1995)
- The Stedelijk Van Abbemuseum, Eindhoven, The Netherlands (1996)
- The Musee d'art Contemporain, Lyon, France (1997)
- Akira Ikeda Gallery, Taura, Japan (2001)
- The Wanas Foundation, Knislinge, Sweden (2002)
- The Hirshhorn Museum and Sculpture Garden, Washington D.C. (2003, 1991)
- MASS MoCA, North Adams, Massachusetts (2003)
- Historiska Museet, Stockholm, Sweden (2004)
- La Maison Rouge Fondation de Antoine Galbert, Paris, France (2005)
- Contemporary Art Museum, Kumamoto, Japan (2006)
- The Guggenheim Museum, New York (2009)
- The Pulitzer Arts Foundation, St. Louis (2010)
- Spencer Museum of Art, Lawrence, KS (2013)
- The Fabric Workshop and Museum, Philadelphia, PA (2016)

== Select works ==
- the event of a thread (2012)
- VERSE (2011)
- stylus (2010)
- human carriage (2009)
- The Meditation Boat (2005–2009)
- tower · Oliver Ranch (2007)
- voce (2006)
- phora (2005)
- corpus (2004)
- Teardrop Park, a collaboration with Michael Mercil and Michael Van Valkenburgh (2004)
- LEW wood floor at the Seattle Public Library (2004)
- lignum (2002)
- Allegheny Park, a collaboration with Michael Mercil and Michael Van Valkenburgh (1993–2001)
- the picture is still (2001)
- ghost....a border act (2000)
- myein (1999)
- mattering (1997)
- lineament (1994)
- tropos (1994)
- indigo blue (1991/2007)
- privation and excesses (1989)
- still life (1988)

== Selected group exhibitions ==
- Rites of Spring, Twining Gallery, New York, 1985
- Elements, Whitney Museum of American Art at Philip Morris, New York, 1987
- Stranger Attractors: Signs of Chaos, New Museum of Contemporary Art, New York, 1989
- New Works for New Spaces, Wexner Center for the Visual Arts, Columbus, Ohio, 1990

== Permanent public installations ==
- Mess Hall, Headlands Center for the Arts, Sausalito, California, 1989
- San Francisco Public Library Commission (collaboration with James Freed, Kathy Simon, and Ann Chamberlain), 1990
- Pittsburgh River Front Park (collaboration with Michael Van Valkenburgh, Michael Mercil, and Matthew Urbansky), 1994

== Awards ==
Heinz Award in the Arts and Humanities (2008), United States Artists Fellowship (2007), Environmental Design Research Association Place Design Award (2002), American Society of Landscape Architects Design Award (2002), the Larry Aldrich Foundation Award (1998), Progressive Architecture Citation Award (1997), the Wexner Center for the Arts Residency (1995), NEA Visual Arts Fellowship (1993), MacArthur Fellowship (1993) Skowhegan Medal for Sculpture (1992), the Louis Comfort Tiffany Foundation Award (1990), Award in the Visual Arts 9 (1990), the Guggenheim Memorial Fellowship (1989), and the Bessie Award, New York Annual Award in the Performing Arts (1988).

== Recognition ==
- Hamilton has been the recipient of the 14th Annual Heinz Award in the Arts and Humanities,
- United States Artists Fellowship,
- Bessie Award in 1988,
- National Endowment for the Arts Visual Arts Fellowship,
- Anonymous Was a Woman Award,
- Louis Comfort Tiffany Foundation Award,
- Skowhegan Medal for Sculpture,
- Guggenheim Memorial Fellowship,
- MacArthur Fellows Program "Genius Grant",

In 2014, Ohio State University announced that it was compiling an archive called the Ann Hamilton Project Archive, which will maintain images of more than 35 of Hamilton's installations. And in September 2015, Hamilton received the National Medal of Arts.
