= Vitruvian Park =

Commercial development in Texas

Coordinates: 32.935037°N 96.852615°W

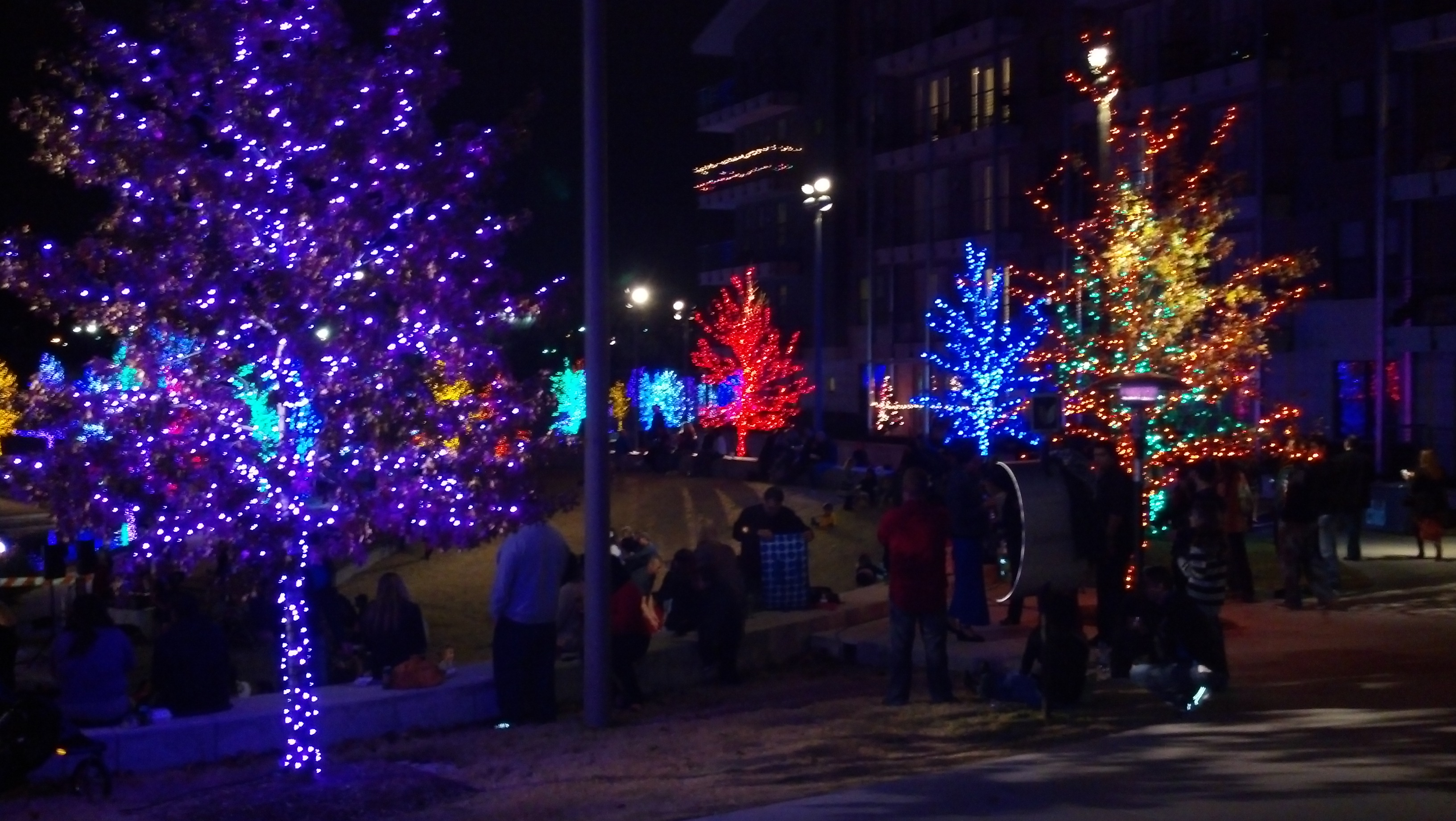
- View alongside Vitruvian Way near the lake and Savoye Apartments, December 2012
- Interactive map of Vitruvian Park
- Location: Addison, Texas (USA)
- Status: Open
- Groundbreaking: May 2008
- Opening: January 2010
- Use: residential, retail, office
- Website: http://www.vitruvianpark.com

Companies
- Developer: UDR, Inc.

Technical details
- Size: 117 acres (0.47 km^{2})

Vitruvian Park is a multi-family, retail and commercial development in Addison, Texas. The development is just west of the Dallas North Tollway, approximately one mile north of I-635/LBJ Freeway between Midway Road and Marsh Lane in Addison's southwest quadrant. Adjacent to the community are Brookhaven Country Club, Brookhaven College, Greenhill School, Parish Episcopal School, and a shopping center. In addition to being the largest development ever undertaken by major real estate developer UDR, Inc., the 117-acre (0.47 km^{2}) development is also Addison's first major sustainable green initiative.

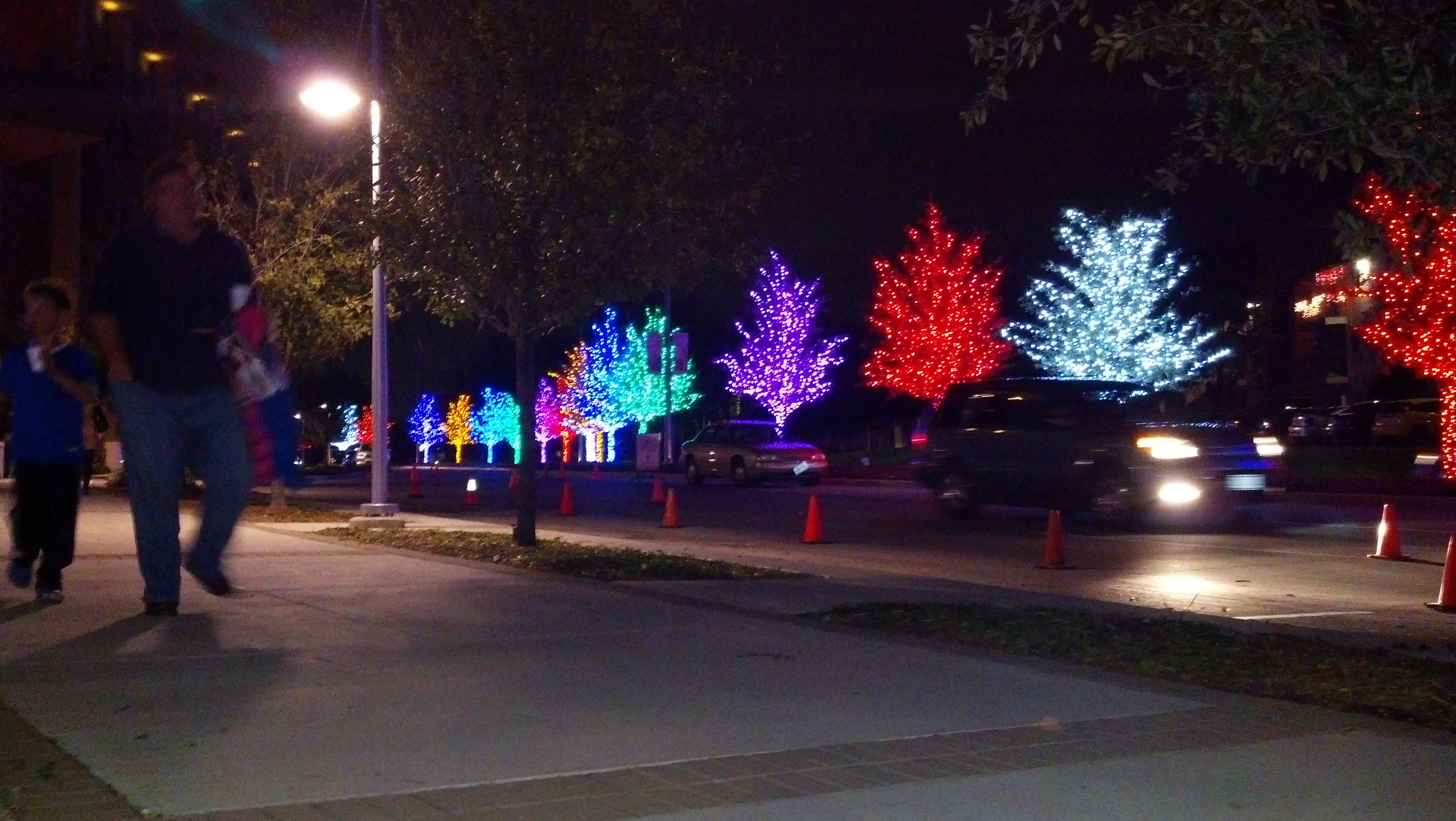
View facing Vitruvian Way, December 2012

The park draws its design from Roman architect Vitruvius' only surviving work, De Architectura. Savoye, the first phase was designed to feature 744 multifamily housing units, 26,000 square feet (2,400 m^{2}) of retail and a 12-acre (49,000 m^{2}) public park including a spring-fed creek, bridges and trails.

In December 2012, the City of Addison debuted the Vitruvian Lights: Magical Nights of Lights, in which the park was decorated with 1.2 million light bulbs in nine different colors on more than 500 trees. It subsequently became an annual event. The park hosted its second "Vitruvian Lights" in 2013.
