= WaterTower Theatre =

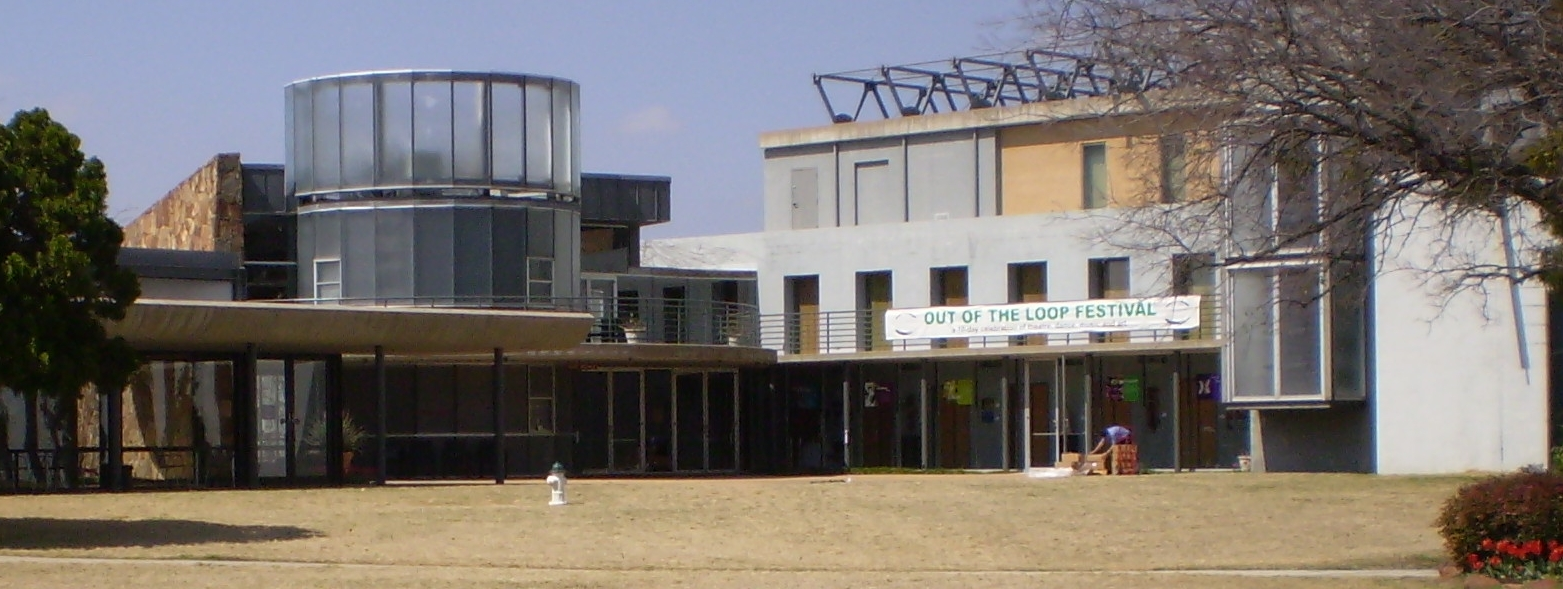
Addison Theatre Centre in Addison, Texas

WaterTower Theatre, formed in 1996, is the resident theatre company of the Addison Theatre Centre, Addison, Texas, in the Dallas/Fort Worth Metroplex.

== History ==
Founded in 1996, WaterTower Theatre (WTT) is one of Texas' leading professional theatre companies and a flagship arts institution in North Texas, having played an important role as a leader in developing new talent, new work, and encouraging the growth of the Dallas/Fort Worth artistic community through its commitment to hiring local artists.

WTT traces its origins back to Addison Community Theater of the 1970s which began performing at the Old Stone Cottage, a 1930s WPA project which still stands adjacent to WTT's current home at the Addison Theatre Centre. Addison Theatre Centre, completed in 1992, is a 32,000-square-foot space, including a Main Stage – a flexible black box space with seating for approximately 200 – and a smaller Studio Theatre. WTT is the resident theatre company of the Addison Theatre Centre, which also houses WTT's administrative, artistic, and production offices.

WTT's commitment to new work is reflected in its history of world premieres including Song of Motherhood (1998), Blind Lemon Jefferson: Prince of Country Blues (2001), A Country Life (2005), Creep (2015), The Spark (2015), The Great Distance Home (2017), and Bread by Regina Taylor (2018), as well as its Out of the Loop Festival (2002-2016), and DETOUR: a Festival of New Work (beginning in 2018).

WTT includes among its alumni many actors whose careers include Broadway, national tours, film, and television credits, including Sandy Duncan (Peter Pan); Major Attaway (Broadway: Aladdin); Brian Gonzales (Broadway: One Man, Two Guvnors; Aladdin); Liz Mikel (Broadway: Lysistrata Jones; TV: Friday Night Lights; Sordid Lives); Cedric Neal (Broadway: Gershwin's Porgy & Bess; After Midnight); Stacey Oristano (TV: Friday Night Lights; Bunheads; Shameless); and Akron Watson (Broadway: The Color Purple; The Play that Goes Wrong).

== Performance venues ==
The Theatre's venue, the Addison Theatre Centre, is a 32,000-square-foot (3,000 m^{2}) custom-designed space, including the Main Stage (seating approximately 240) and the Studio Theatre (seating approximately 100). The Addison Theatre Centre was profiled in the “American Stages” series produced by National Public Radio’s All Things Considered, in a segment on “Theater Shape and Design.” Productions are also staged in the Stone Cottage (seating approximately 50) adjacent to the Theatre Centre.
