= Matthew Urbanski =

American landscape architect (born 1963)

Matthew Louis Urbanski
- Born: Matthew Louis Urbanski; 1963 (age 62–63)
- Occupation: Architect
- Awards: Design Merit Award, Design Honor Award, Planning and Analysis Merit Award, and Planning and Analysis Honor Award (all ASLA)
- Projects: Brooklyn Bridge Park, Allegheny Riverfront Park, Teardrop Park

Matthew Louis Urbanski (born 1963) is an American landscape architect. He has planned and designed landscapes in the United States, Canada, and France, including waterfronts, parks, college campuses, sculpture gardens, and private gardens. Collaborating with Michael Van Valkenburgh, he was a lead designer of many projects in the Northeastern United States, including Brooklyn Bridge Park, Alumnae Valley at Wellesley College, Allegheny Riverfront Park, and Teardrop Park. In addition to his work as a designer, Urbanski is a co-owner of a native plants nursery in New Jersey.

== Early years and schooling ==
Matthew Urbanski was born in 1963 and grew up in Holmdel, New Jersey. Urbanski attended Albright College and graduated in 1985 with a Bachelor of Science, majoring in biology. From 1985 to 1986 he studied horticulture at the Delaware Valley College of Science and Agriculture. Urbanski attended Harvard's Graduate School of Design, receiving his Master of Landscape Architecture degree in 1989. One of Urbanski's design instructors while at Harvard was Michael Van Valkenburgh.

== Michael Van Valkenburgh Associates, Inc. ==
Urbanski joined Michael Van Valkenburgh Associates (MVVA) in 1989, a move that surprised many classmates because he and Van Valkenburgh had frequently argued while Urbanski was at Harvard. Urbanski became a firm Principal in 2000. He and Van Valkenburgh are frequently listed as co-designers on many of the firm's projects.

== Design approach ==
Matthew Urbanski began his career at MVVA working on both small gardens and on larger projects, most notably Mill Race Park in Columbus, Indiana. As a designer, Urbanski frequently uses plantings in dramatic ways that create a strong sense of contrast when read against other aspects of their context. Examples of this include the use of birches and meadow plantings in the General Mills entry garden (now destroyed) and the steeply planted hills of Teardrop Park. Van Valkenburgh and Urbanski have coined the term “hypernature” to describe this aspect of their work.

Urbanski has emerged as a leader in the firm's efforts to redefine the way that urban landscapes are planned and built, most notably in the Brooklyn Bridge Park project and the Lower Don Lands plan. He makes the argument that the city, which consists of a series of interdependent systems, resembles a landscape more than it does a building. In working with planners, engineers, and architects to reclaim formerly industrial territories, Urbanski and MVVA promote integrated approaches to urban systems and greater awareness of the role that landscape space and ecological function play in the quality of urban life. In a paper entitled “Do Landscape Architects Make the Best Urban Designers” that he delivered at the 2009 “Landscape – Great Idea” X-L.Arch III conference in Vienna, Urbanski laid out the concept of “landscape imagination” that he feels differentiates the urban design work of MVVA from traditional urban planning. While traditional urban planners had difficulty in moving beyond “the well-intentioned infusion of undifferentiated green spaces,” Urbanski felt that landscape architects in general and MVVA in particular had “faith in the landscape’s ability to resolve difficult urban adjacencies” and that they were more likely to “understand how this full range of landscape typologies can be brought to bear on the problems of the contemporary city.”

== Design language ==
Urbanski is credited with phrases that describe paradoxes encountered in contemporary design:

- “Proposed Existing Condition” – refers to a project's anticipated context, something that does not exist at the moment that the design investigation is taking place. Coined in conjunction with work on Teardrop Park, a courtyard-type park that was planned and built before the towers that eventually surrounded it.
- ”Permanent Temporary Condition” – refers to an urban condition that was meant to be temporary, but ended up being permanent. Originally used to refer to metal barricades located along the northern boundary of the Union Square Park Plaza.

== Design awards ==
Urbanski has been a co-designer or lead designer on many works by Michael Van Valkenburgh Associates that have gone on to win professional awards. Some of these awards include:

- Honor Award from the Boston Society of Landscape Architects for Mill Race Park in Columbus, Indiana, 1993
- Design Merit Award, ASLA for the Vera List Courtyard at the New School for Social Research, New York, NY, 1998
- Planning and Analysis Merit Award, ASLA, for Wellesley College, Wellesley, MA 1999
- Citation from Progressive Architecture for Allegheny Riverfront Park in Pittsburgh, Pennsylvania 2002
- Design Merit Award, ASLA, Allegheny Riverfront Park, Pittsburgh, PA, 2002
- Places Magazine/EDRA Place Design Award, Allegheny Riverfront Park, Pittsburgh, PA, 2002
- Design Merit Award, ASLA, Spider Island, Chicago Botanic Garden, Glenncoe, IL, 2002
- Design Honor Award, ASLA, for the Herman Miller Factory Landscape, Cherokee County, GA 2005
- Design Excellence Award, ASLA, for Alumnae Valley at Wellesley College, Wellesley, MA, 2006
- Planning and Analysis Honor Award, for the Lower Don Lands project, Toronto, ON, 2008
- Planning and Analysis Honor Award, for the Brooklyn Bridge Park Master Plan, Brooklyn, NY 2009
- Design Honor Award, ASLA, for Teardrop Park, New York, NY, 2009
- Design Honor Award, ASLA, for Connecticut Water Treatment Facility, New Haven, CT, 2010

== Publications ==
- Taking Measures Across the American Landscape, M. Van Valkenburgh, A. S. MacLean, J. Corner
- Michael, J. Gilette, Landscape Architecture Magazine, February 1998
- The Active Edge, A. Blum, Metropolis, March 2006
- Design with the Land: Landscape Architecture of Michael Van Valkenburgh, M. Van Valkenburgh, with essays by Peter Rose, Will Miller, James Corner, Paula Deitz, John Beardsley, and Mildred Friedman, Princeton Architectural Press, 1994
- Michael Van Valkenburgh/Allegheny Riverfront Park: Source Books in Landscape Architecture, J. Amidon, Princeton Architectural Press, 2005
- Abstract Realism, S. Hines, Landscape Architecture Magazine, 97, no. 2
- On the New Waterfront, A. Ulam, Landscape Architecture Magazine, November 2011
- Trophy Parks, Luncheon Forum on West Side Parks Development, held November 17, 2010, Urban Design Review, Fall/Winter 2011, Installment No. 2

== Notable works ==
A list of notable works by Michael Van Valkenburgh Associates that have involved Urbanski as co-designer or lead designer:

- Pucker Garden, Brookline, Massachusetts, 1990
- General Mills Sculpture Garden, Minneapolis, 1991 (destroyed 2000)
- Redesign of The Jardin Des Tuileries, Paris, France, 1991
- Mill Race Park, Columbus, Indiana, 1993
- 50 Avenue Montaigne Courtyard, Paris, France, 1993
- Vera List Courtyard, New School University, New York, New York 1997
- Allegheny Riverfront Park, Pittsburgh, Pennsylvania, 1998
- Spider Island, Chicago Botanic Garden, Glencoe, Illinois, 2000
- Herman Miller Factory Landscape, Cherokee County, Georgia, 2001
- Straightsview Farm, San Juan Island, Washington, 2003
- Nomentana Garden, Stoneham, Maine, 2005
- Alumnae Valley, Wellesley College, Wellesley, Massachusetts, 2005
- Lake Whitney Water Treatment Plant, New Haven, Connecticut, 2005
- Teardrop Park in Battery Park City, New York NY, 2006
- Pier 1, Brooklyn Bridge Park, Brooklyn, NY 2010
- Pier 6, Brooklyn Bridge Park, Brooklyn, NY 2010
- Segment 5, Hudson River Park, New York, NY 2010
