= Blah! Blah! Blah! =

Series of paintings by Mel Bochner

Blah! Blah! Blah! is series of word paintings executed by the American conceptual artist and painter Mel Bochner between 2008 and 2012, featuring various chromatic and placement variations on the words and in concert the phrase "Blah! Blah! Blah!".

Bochner has said of his painterly employment of the phrase … "‘Blah blah blah is a way of shorthanding a conversation’.... ‘you know what I’m saying, so blah blah blah’. It’s a form of agreement. But it also carries a contradictory and critical meaning – what you are hearing or saying is in fact meaningless, it’s simply blah blah blah. It’s about the emptiness, the endlessness and the darkness of the discourse’.

These canvases like much of Bochner's later work employ a drippy paint style which the painter relates is influenced by the work of the post abstract expressionist artists Robert Rauschenberg and Jasper Johns. The seminal Bochner Blah! Blah! Blah! painting was completed in 2008.

The series was created in different mediums and subsequent print runs have been issued later than the time span the painting series was executed in (Blah! Blah! Blah!). Among the museums who have a work(s) from the series in their permanent collections is the Art Institute of Chicago.
