= Fundred Dollar Bill Project =

Former art project by Mel Chin

The Fundred Dollar Bill Project was an art project implemented by the American artist Mel Chin to draw awareness to and propose a funding solution for the lead contamination in the soil of New Orleans, Louisiana. After expanding in focus to also include the Flint water crisis, the program drew to a close in 2019.

== Description ==
People in the United States and around the globe were invited to draw their own 100 dollar bills on a template. The Fundred Dollar Bills will be presented to Congress for an even exchange of U.S. dollars to help the remediation of lead in the soil of New Orleans.

The intention is to collect three million Fundred bills.

== Armored truck tour ==
Throughout 2010, students at hundreds of schools across the country created Fundred Dollar Bills that were picked up in a specially designed armored truck that ran on vegetable oil.

=== Cities ===
In the fall of 2014, the ArtPrize competition in Grand Rapids, Michigan featuring the Fundred Dollar Bill Project, offered an opportunity to raise visibility of local lead issues and invite participation from the tends of thousands of expected visitors. In 2015, the Art Academy of Cincinnati partnered with the Fundred Dollar Bill Project and the Cincinnati Health Department Childhood Lead Poisoning Prevention Program to create a course that used art and design to address and impact issues of lead contamination in Cincinnati.

== Exhibition and culmination ==
As an extension of Mel Chin's multi-venue exhibition, All Over the Place, the Fundred Project was on view at the Queens Museum in 2018. The program wound down the following year.
