= Mel Bochner =

American conceptual artist (1940–2025)

- Born: August 23, 1940; Pittsburgh, Pennsylvania, U.S.
- Died: February 12, 2025 (aged 84); New York City, U.S.
- Education: School of Art at Carnegie Mellon University
- Known for: Conceptual art, Installation art
- Spouse: Lizbeth Marano
- Children: 2

Melvin Simon Bochner (August 23, 1940 – February 12, 2025) was an American conceptual artist. He is considered to be one of the founders of Conceptual Art, and credited with reshaping the canon of contemporary art. Bochner's 1966 exhibition, “Working Drawings And Other Visible Things On Paper Not Necessarily Meant To Be Viewed As Art,” is cited as one of the first conceptual art exhibitions in the world.

== Early life and education ==
Melvin Simon Bochner was born in Pittsburgh on August 23, 1940. His father, Meyer Bochner was a sign painter, and his mother, Minnie Horowitz, was a homemaker. He was raised with one brother and one sister.

At age 8, he starting taking art classes at Carnegie Museum. In high school, he won recognition for his talent from The Scholastic Art & Writing Awards and studied with Joseph Fitzpatrick.

He attended Carnegie Mellon University and received his BFA in 1962.

After graduation, Bochner lived in San Francisco, traveled around Mexico, and eventually landed in Chicago, where he audited philosophy classes at Northwestern University.

== Career ==
In 1964, Bochner moved to New York City and worked as a guard at The Jewish Museum. In 1966, he was recruited by the influential art critic Dore Ashton to teach art history at the School of Visual Arts in New York.

Bochner was Jewish, and his work sometimes explored Jewish themes. Starting in the 1960s, he evolved several of the exhibition strategies now taken for granted, including using the walls of the gallery as the subject of the work and using photo documentation of ephemeral and performance works. As Richard Kalina wrote in Art in America in 1996, Bochner was one of the earliest proponents, along with Joseph Kosuth and Bruce Nauman, of photo-documentation work in which the artist "created not so much a sculpture as a two-dimensional work about sculpture."

His 1966 show at the School of Visual Arts, "Working Drawings And Other Visible Things On Paper Not Necessarily Meant To Be Viewed As Art", is regarded as a seminal show in the conceptual art movement. Bochner photocopied his friends' working drawings, including a $3,051.16 fabricator's bill from Donald Judd. He collected the copies in four black binders and displayed them on four pedestals. The show was remade at the Drawing Center, New York, in 1998.

Bochner began making paintings in the late 1970s, and his paintings range from extremely colorful works containing words (such as Blah! Blah! Blah!) to works more clearly connected to the conceptual art he pioneered. For a 1998 work titled Event Horizon, for example, he arranged prestretched canvases of various sizes along a wall, each marked with a horizontal line and a number denoting its width in inches. Together, the lines appear to form a horizon, creating what Jeffrey Weiss in his catalog essay for Bochner's 2007 exhibit Event Horizon called a representation of "the world as a fantasy of quantifiable truth." Bochner made his first prints at Crown Point Press in the early 1970s, published by Parasol Press.

He taught at Yale University as a teacher's assistant in 1979, as senior critic in painting and printmaking, and in 2001 as adjunct professor.

In 2005, Bochner received an honorary Doctor of Fine Arts from Carnegie Mellon School of Art, his alma mater. His work is represented by Fraenkel Gallery (San Francisco); Peter Freeman Inc. (New York and Paris); and Marc Selwyn Fine Art (Los Angeles).

== Personal life ==
Bochner lived in Manhattan with his wife, Lizbeth Marano; they had two daughters. He died at a Manhattan hospital on February 12, 2025, at the age of 84, of complications from a fall.

== Collections ==
Bochner's work appears in several major museum and private collections, including the Art Institute of Chicago, Carnegie Museum of Art, Courtauld Institute of Art, Museum of Modern Art, The Metropolitan Museum of Art, National Gallery of Art, the Schnitzer Collection, and the Smithsonian American Art Museum.

== Exhibitions ==
In 1985, the Carnegie Mellon Art Gallery organized a major survey titled Mel Bochner:1973-1985. Elaine A. King was the curator of this exhibition and it was accompanied by the publication of a catalog of the same title. This catalogue was given an award by the American Association of Museums. King wrote the essay "Building a Language," and Charles Stuckey contributed the piece "An Interview with Mel Bochner." The exhibition traveled to the Kuntzmuseum in Luzern, Switzerland and Center for Fine Arts, Miami. John Russell wrote in a New York Times article, "Art View; The Best and Biggest in Pittsburgh",

The Bochner retrospective is divided between the university art gallery and the Hewlett Gallery in the College of Fine Arts, a short walk away. In the catalogue, Miss King and Charles Stuckey do a fine job of elucidation. Their time was well spent.

In 1995, Yale University Art Gallery organized a retrospective, Mel Bochner: Thought Made Visible 1966–1973. The exhibit traveled to Brussels and Munich and was accompanied by the publication of a catalog. For his solo show at Sonnabend Gallery in New York in 2000, Bochner layered German and English versions of a text from Wittgenstein. In her review of the show for Art in America, Eleanor Heartney wrote:

In Bochner's work, perception constantly trumps idea, reaffirming the artist's belief that the sensuous is an essential element in even the most conceptual art.

In 2004, Bochner's work was exhibited in the Whitney Biennial and was part of OpenSystems: Rethinking Art c. 1970 at London's Tate Modern in 2005.

In 2006, "Mel Bochner: Drawing from Four Decades" traveled to the Birmingham Museum of Art (July 9–September 30, 2006), Weatherspoon Art Museum (October 15–December 23, 2006), and San Diego Museum of Art (January 13–March 18, 2007).

In 2008, Bochner initiated a four-year painting series titled BLAH! BLAH! BLAH! after the motif of the textual content of the works.

In 2011, a retrospective of his work was held at the National Gallery of Art in Washington D.C.

A survey of Mel Bochner's work - entitled Mel Bochner: If the Colour Changes, was held at Whitechapel Gallery, London, Haus der Kunst, Munich, and Museu de Arte Contemporânea de Serralves, Porto during 2012. Tracing nearly 50 years of work, this exhibition commences with "Blah, Blah, Blah" (2011) a huge painting that encapsulates Bochner's ongoing fascination with language and color. The exhibition is accompanied by a first comprehensive monograph, published by Ridinghouse, with essays by Achim Borchardt-Hume, Briony Fer, João Fernandes, Mark Godfrey, and Ulrich Wilmes.

In 2015, Mount Holyoke College Art Museum hosted the exhibition, "Mel Bochner: Illustrating Philosophy," and a videotaped conversation between Bochner and Thomas E. Wartenberg, a philosophy professor at Mount Holyoke.

In 2024, “Mel Bochner: Words Mean Everything – From the Collections of Jordan D. Schnitzer and His Family Foundation”, opened at The Schnitzer Collection in Portland, Oregon.

== Publications ==
- King, Elaine (1985). Mel Bochner 1973-1985, Carnegie Mellon University Press.
- Valery, Paul (1988). Mel Bochner Drawings, David Nolan Gallery.
- Bochner, Mel (1990). Mel Bochner: Photo Pieces 1966-1967, David Nolan Gallery.
- Field, Richard (1995). Mel Bochner: Thought Made Visible 1966-1973, Yale University Art Gallery.
- Bochner, Mel, and Barry Schwabsky (1998). Mel Bochner Drawings, 1966-1973, Lawrence Markey, Inc.
- Rothkopf, Scott, with and essay by Elisabeth Sussman (2002). Mel Bochner Photographs, 1966-1969, Harvard Art Museums.
- Burton, Johanna (2007). Mel Bochner: Language 1966-2006, Art Institute of Chicago.
- Bochner, Mel, and Yve-Alain Bois (2008). Solar System & Rest Rooms: Writings and Interviews, 1965-2007, The MIT Press.
- Bochner, Mel, and Jeffrey Weiss (2010). Mel Bochner Photographs and Not Photographs, Fraenkel Gallery
- Bochner, Mel, and Barry Schwabsky (2013). Mel Bochner: Monoprints: Words, Words, Words… Two Palms, NY.
- Borchardt-Hume, Achim, and Doro Globus (2013). Mel Bochner: If the Colour Changes, Ram Publications.
- Kleeblatt, Norman L. (2014). Mel Bochner Strong Language, Jewish Museum.
- Weiss, Jeffrey (2015). Mel Bochner: Drawings 1966-1968, Craig F Starr Gallery.
- Peter Freeman, Inc. (2017). Mel Bochner: Voices, Yale University Press.

== Artists books and multiples ==
- Singer Notes, 1968, 132 pages, 25.8 x 20.5 x 1.4 cm. Limited edition of 200 numbered and signed copies and 50 artist's proofs. Produced and published in 2017 by Michèle Didier.
- Measurement Perimeter, Black adhesive tape (thickness 1.3 cm) placed on the wall (height 1.80 m). The total dimension of the room is indicated on the wall in Letraset (thickness about 6.5 cm). Dimensions depending on the size of the room. Limited edition of 3 numbered and signed copies. Produced in 2017 by Michèle Didier.

== See also ==
- Kraus Campo
