= Addison, Texas =

Town in Texas, United States

- Town
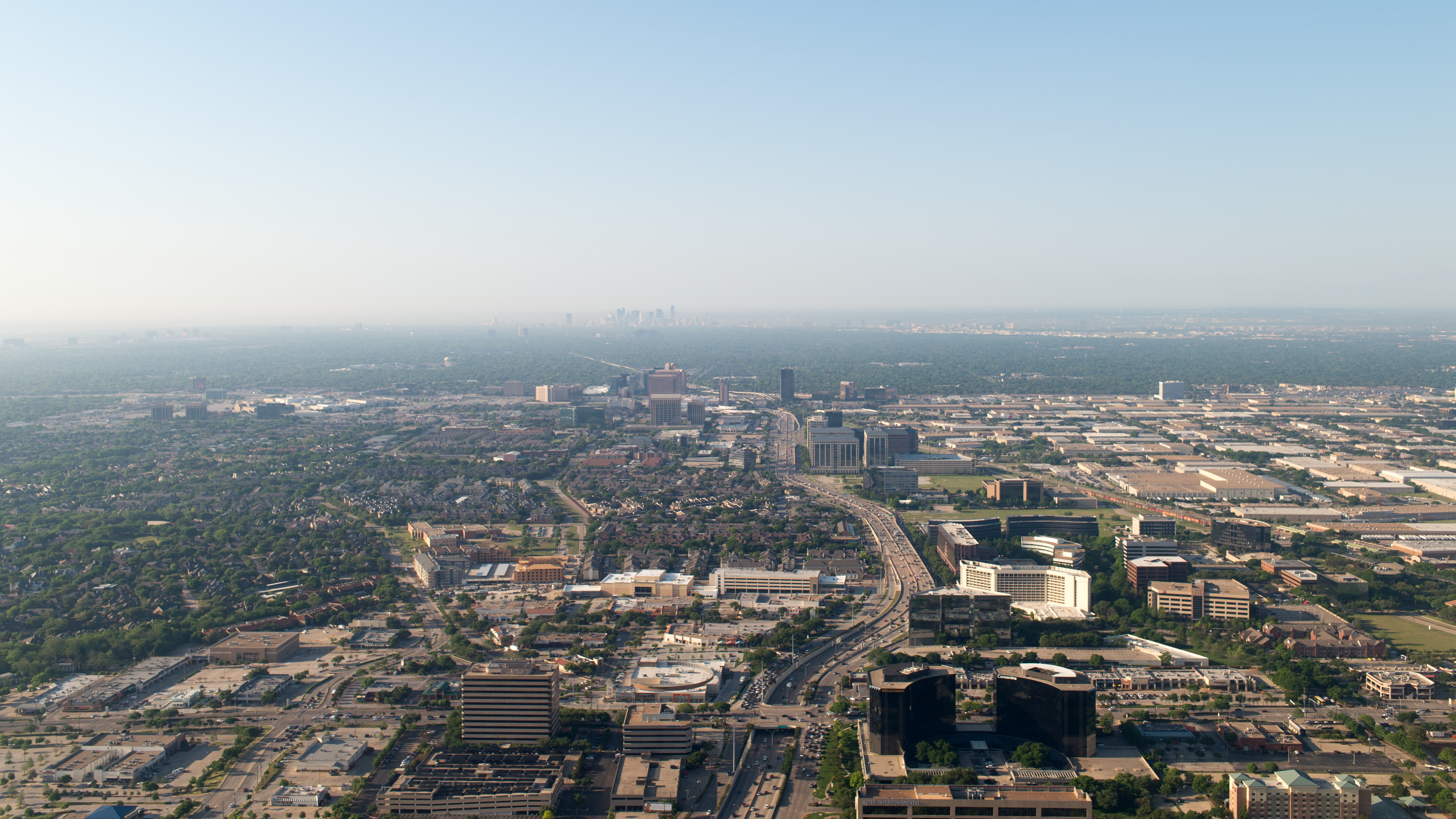
- Aerial view of Addison looking south towards downtown Dallas
- Interactive map of Addison, Texas
- Location within Texas Location within the United States Location within North America
- Coordinates: 32°57′28″N 96°50′6″W
- Country: United States
- State: Texas
- County: Dallas

Government
  - Type: City council - city manager
  - Mayor: Bruce Arfsten
  - City manager: David Gaines
  - City council: City council: Marlin Willesen (Mayor Pro Tempore); Chris DeFrancisco (Deputy Mayor Pro Tempore); Howard Freed; Darren Gardner; Dan Liscio; Randy Smith

Area
  - Total: 4.36 sq mi (11.28 km^{2})
  - Land: 4.35 sq mi (11.27 km^{2})
  - Water: 0.0039 sq mi (0.01 km^{2})
- Elevation: 636 ft (194 m)

Population (2020)
  - Total: 16,661
  - Estimate (2023): 17,100
  - Density: 3,736.3/sq mi (1,442.59/km^{2})
- Time zone: UTC-6 (CST)
  - Summer (DST): UTC-5 (CDT)
- ZIP code: 75001
- Area codes: 214, 469, 945, 972
- FIPS code: 48-01240
- GNIS feature ID: 1329223

Addison is an incorporated town (Note: Addison refers to itself as the "Town of Addison", rather than the customary "city" label.) in Dallas County, Texas, United States. The 2020 census population was 16,661. Addison is immediately north of Dallas.

Addison and Flower Mound were the only two Texas municipalities labeled "towns" with a population greater than 10,000 at the 2010 census; since then the municipalities of Prosper and Trophy Club—also identifying as towns—have also exceeded 10,000 in population estimates.

== History ==
Addison was originally part of Peter's Colony. The future town site was settled as early as 1846 when Preston Witt built a house near White Rock Creek. In 1849, the Witt family opened a gristmill. In 1880, settler Sidney Smith Noell purchased a large tract of land south of what is now Belt Line Road. In 1888, Noell, together with W.W. Julian and W. E. Horten, donated land to the St. Louis, Arkansas and Texas Railway, a predecessor of the St. Louis Southwestern Railway (known as the Cotton Belt), for a coaling station.

The first substantial industry in the community was a cotton gin which opened in 1902. In 1903, the Cotton Belt built a depot and a 12 mi (19 km) branch line leading south to Dallas, named the site Noell Junction, and introduced passenger train service. In 1904, a post office opened; however, there was already a community named Noell in Leon County, Texas, so the new community changed its name to Addison, after Addison Robertson, a local resident who would later serve as the community's second postmaster from 1908 to 1916. Also in 1904, Julian platted the first six city blocks.

The population grew to 75 by 1914, at which time the community had three grocers and a bank, but the bank later failed and the population fell to 40 in 1926. After World War II, residents grew concerned that the nearby cities of Dallas, Carrollton, or Farmers Branch might annex the community, so they petitioned the county to allow an election for incorporation. The election was held on June 15, 1953, and by a vote of 19 in favor and 11 against, Addison was incorporated as a city.

In 1955, W.T. Overton, a 28-year-old businessman from Dallas, purchased a large farm north of the Cotton Belt depot, and in January 1956, he announced that the site would be redeveloped as an airport focused on business aircraft. After obtaining final approval from the city, Addison Airport had its formal groundbreaking ceremony on March 16, 1957, and its grand opening took place on October 18 of that year.

At the time, Addison residents relied almost entirely on private wells for water. Overton and his investors realized that a private well would not support their development plans, so they petitioned the city to drill a municipal well and build its first public water system. The project was approved by voters in April 1957 and construction began in August. The well was later supplemented by a large water main extended from Dallas.

In 1961, an investment group including Overton, John D. Murchison (son of oil magnate Clint Murchison Sr.), and Dallas-area developer Trammell Crow opened a 73-acre (30 ha) industrial park in the triangular area formed by the Cotton Belt, Dooley Road, and the main Addison Airport runway.

In 1970, the city had 595 residents and eighty businesses. That decade, the local government heavily promoted industrial development. In 1976, residents voted to allow the sale of alcoholic beverages, which was prohibited in most of Dallas County and nearby Collin County; together with low taxes, this prompted many restaurants and hotels to open in the city. The town grew very quickly in the late 1970s and early 1980s. By 1986, there were 49 restaurants in town; in 1991, there were 118, and the population had grown to over 8,000. From 1989 through 1991, Addison hosted the Dallas Grand Prix.

In 1982 the name of the city was changed to the "Town of Addison".

The Addison Airport Toll Tunnel, a three-year, $26.8 million project to relieve traffic on Belt Line Road, was completed in February 1999, restoring the continuity of Keller Springs Road 42 years after it was severed by the construction of Addison Airport.

== Geography ==
Addison is located within the Dallas-Fort Worth-Arlington metropolitan statistical area. According to the United States Census Bureau, the town has a total area of 4.4 square miles (11 km^{2}), all land. Addison Airport covers roughly one-eighth of the town's area.

Addison is bordered by Dallas to the north, east, and south, Carrollton to the west, and Farmers Branch to the west and south.

== Demographics ==
Historical population
Census	Pop.	Note	%±
1960	308		—
1970	593		92.5%
1980	5,553		836.4%
1990	8,783		58.2%
2000	14,166		61.3%
2010	13,056		−7.8%
2020	16,661		27.6%
1960–2000, 2010

=== 2020 census ===
As of the 2020 census, Addison had a population of 16,661. The median age was 33.3 years. About 12.1% of residents were under the age of 18, and 9.4% were 65 years of age or older. For every 100 females, there were 97.2 males, and for every 100 females age 18 and over, there were 97.6 males age 18 and over.

There were 9,533 households in Addison, of which 13.7% had children under the age of 18 living in them. Of all households, 24.5% were married-couple households, 31.4% were households with a male householder and no spouse or partner present, and 34.4% were households with a female householder and no spouse or partner present. About 50.1% of all households were made up of individuals, and 6.2% had someone living alone who was 65 years of age or older. There were 3,217 families.

There were 10,591 housing units, of which 10.0% were vacant. The homeowner vacancy rate was 1.7%, and the rental vacancy rate was 9.1%. 100.0% of residents lived in urban areas, while 0.0% lived in rural areas.

Addison racial and ethnic composition (NH = Non-Hispanic) (Note: Note: the U.S. Census treats Hispanic/Latino as an ethnic category. This table excludes Latinos from the racial categories and assigns them to a separate category. Hispanics/Latinos can be of any race.)
Race	Number	Percentage
White (NH)	8,001	48.02%
Black or African American (NH)	2,646	15.88%
Native American or Alaska Native (NH)	56	0.34%
Asian (NH)	1,347	8.08%
Pacific Islander (NH)	5	0.03%
Some Other Race (NH)	103	0.62%
Mixed/Multi-Racial (NH)	696	4.18%
Hispanic or Latino	3,807	22.85%
Total	16,661	

== Economy ==
Though Addison has just over 16,000 residents, daytime population is estimated at over 120,000 as of 2010. Addison contains 22 hotels (with a combined total of over 3,000 rooms) and over two million square feet of office space.

With nearly 200 restaurants, the town touts itself as having more restaurants per capita than any other city in the U.S.

Major corporate headquarters in Addison include Dresser, Daseke, Mary Kay Cosmetics, and Wingstop. Other major employers in Addison include Bank of America, Concentra and IWG. Addison is home to Hand Drawn Pressing, the world's first fully-automated vinyl record pressing plant.

== Arts and culture ==
The WaterTower Theatre produces plays and musicals and hosts the annual Out of the Loop Festival. Addison Circle Park, built in the early 2000s, is a venue for several seasonal outdoor events, such as the "Addison Kaboom Town!," "Addison Oktoberfest," and the foodie fun event, "Taste Addison". The Addison Improv Comedy Club hosts shows.

Texas de Brazil and Fogo de Chão, two Brazilian Churrascaria franchises, originated in Addison.

== Parks and recreation ==
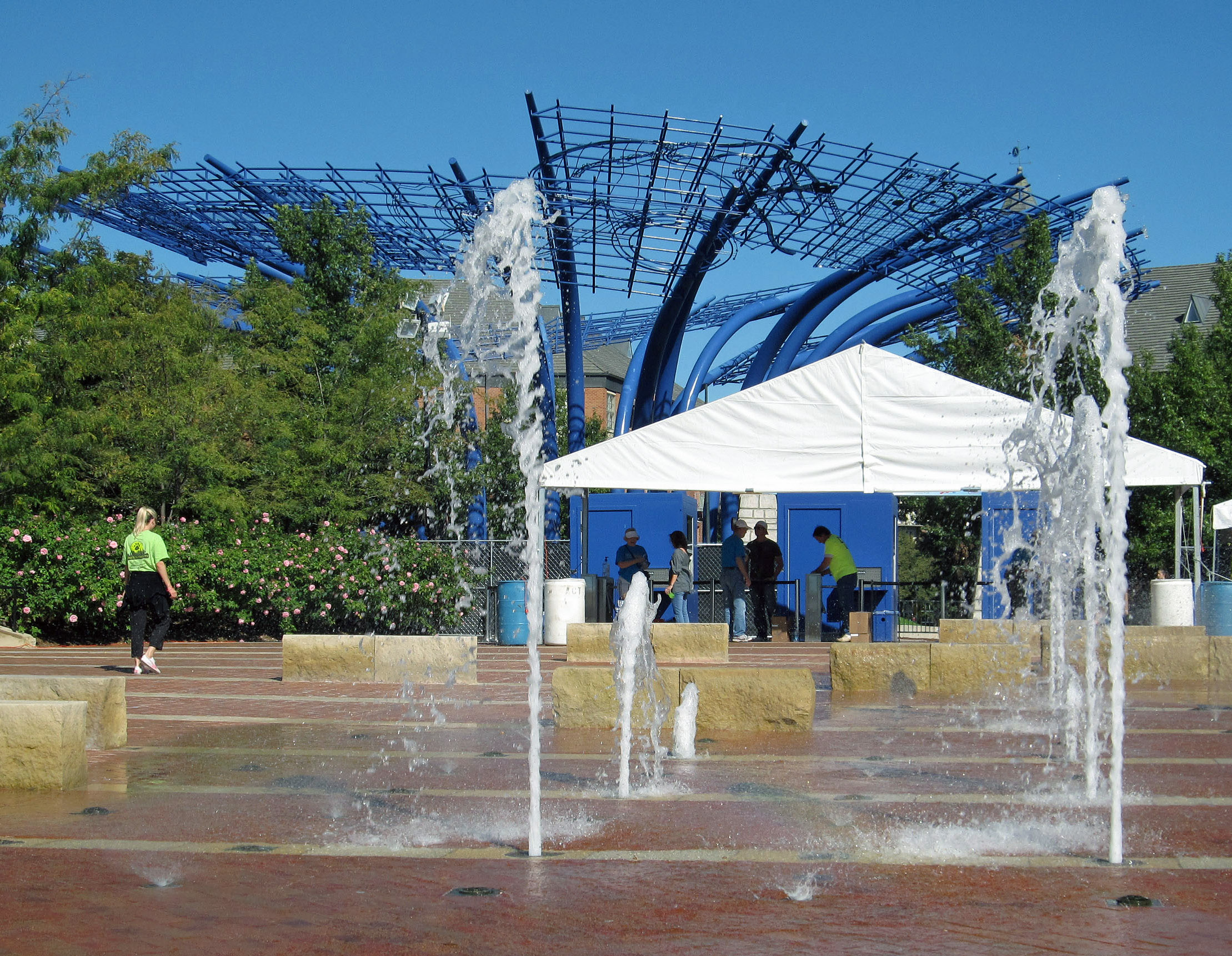
Addison Circle Park and the sculpture Blueprints at Addison Circle

Addison has 118 acres (48 ha) of parkland. Addison's first town park opened in 1978. The Dallas Independent School District operates the Alfred J. Loos Athletic Complex in Addison.

The Addison Athletic Club is a 52,000-ft^{2} residents-only facility that features indoor and outdoor swimming pools, a gymnasium, fitness equipment, and racquetball courts.

Addison Circle Park was built in the early 2000s.

Vitruvian Park includes commercial and recreational sections.

There are approximately 27 works of public art throughout the city.

== Government ==
Addison city vote by party in presidential elections
Year	Democratic	Republican	Third Parties
2024	58.10% 4,026	39.96% 2,769	1.95% 135
2020	60.08% 4,465	38.27% 2,844	1.65% 123
2016	51.05% 3,050	42.88% 2,562	6.07% 363
2012	44.10% 2,170	54.05% 2,660	1.85% 91

== Education ==
Most residents are zoned to the Dallas Independent School District, while those on the southern end of Spring Valley and Vitruvian Way are zoned to the Carrollton-Farmers Branch Independent School District.

George H. W. Bush Elementary School of Dallas ISD is located within town boundaries. It was scheduled to open in 2012. Bush's attendance boundary covers most of Addison, and DISD allows people in other parts of Addison in its boundaries to attend Bush. Other DISD elementary schools with attendance boundaries including parts of Addison are Anne Frank and Jerry Junkins. Residents zoned to Bush and Junkins are zoned to Walker Middle School and W.T. White High School, while residents zoned to Frank are zoned to Benjamin Franklin Middle and Hillcrest High.

The C-FBISD area is divided between the boundaries of Stark and Blair elementary schools, and all of the C-FBISD portion is within the zones of Vivian Field Middle and R. L. Turner High. Private, co-educational schools in the Town of Addison include Greenhill School, which enrolls over 1,200 students from preschool to high school, and Trinity Christian Academy, which enrolls over 1,400 from preschool to high school.

The original Addison School building was opened in 1914. In 1954 the school became a part of the Dallas ISD, and the school closed in 1964. That school building is now the "Magic Time Machine Restaurant."
