= Record press =

Machine for manufacturing vinyl records

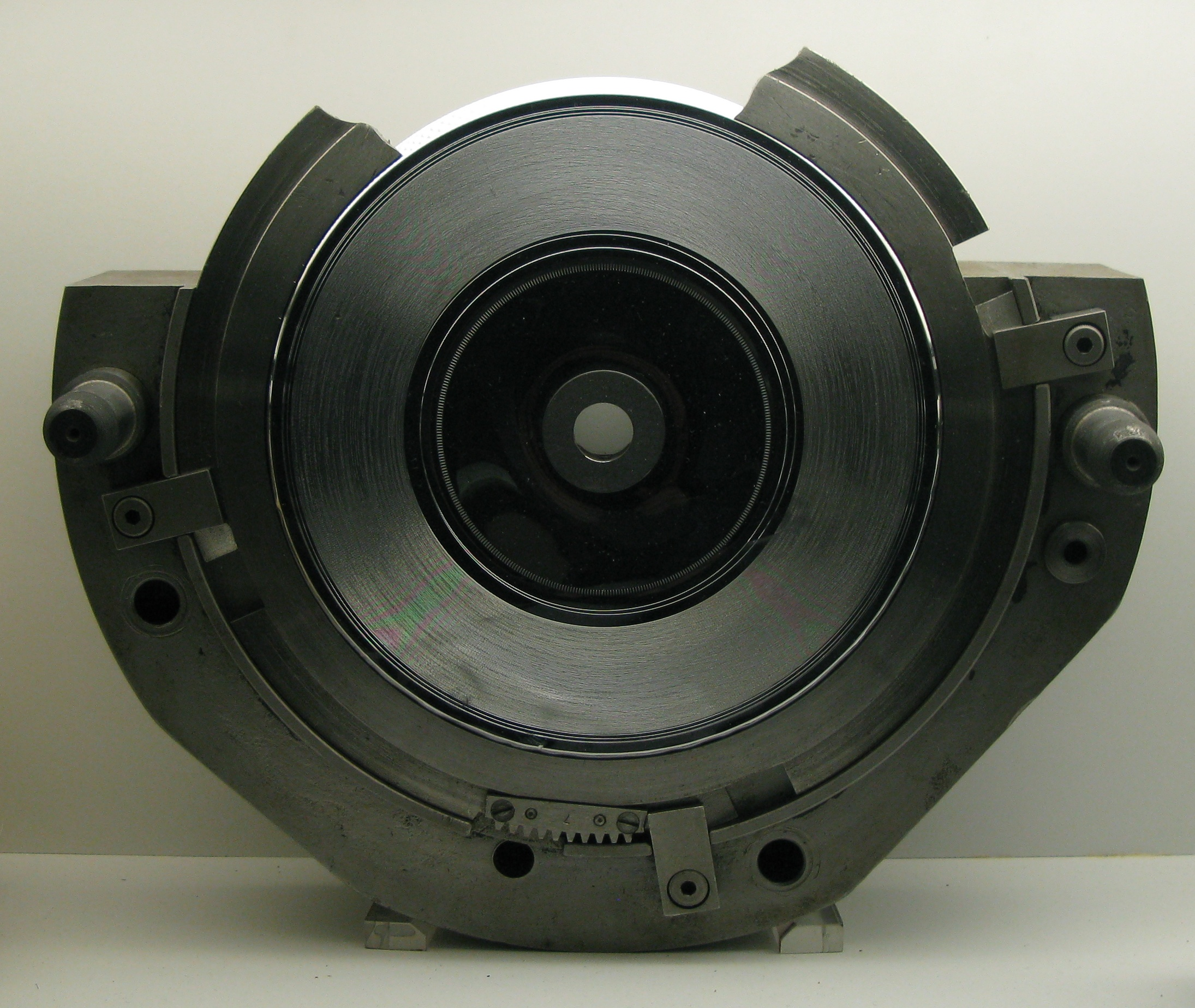
Cutaway shot of one side of a 7-inch record mould with stamper fitted.

A record press or stamper is a machine for manufacturing vinyl records. It is essentially a hydraulic press fitted with thin nickel stampers, which are negative impressions of a master disc. Labels and a pre-heated vinyl patty (or biscuit) are placed in a heated mold cavity. Two stampers are used, one for each side of the disc. The record press closes under about 150 tons of pressure. The process of compression molding forces the hot vinyl to fill the grooves in the stampers, and take the form of the finished record.

== Vacuum molding ==
In the mid-1960s, Emory Cook developed a system of record forming wherein the mold pressure was replaced by a vacuum. In this technique, the mold cavity was evacuated, and vinyl was introduced in micro-particle form. The particles were then flash-fused instantaneously at a high temperature, forming a coherent solid. Cook called this disc manufacturing technology microfusion. A small pressing plant in Hollywood also employed a similar system, which they maintained fused the particles more evenly throughout the disc thickness, calling their product polymax. Both claimed that the resultant disc grooves exhibited less surface noise and greater resistance to deformation from stylus tip inertia than those of conventional pressure-moulded vinyl discs.
