= Ameristar =

Ameristar may refer to:

- Ameristar Air Cargo, an American passenger and cargo airline based in Dallas, Texas, US
- Ameristar Casinos, a former casino operator based in Paradise, Nevada
