= Ameristar Charters Flight 9363 =

2017 aviation accident in Michigan

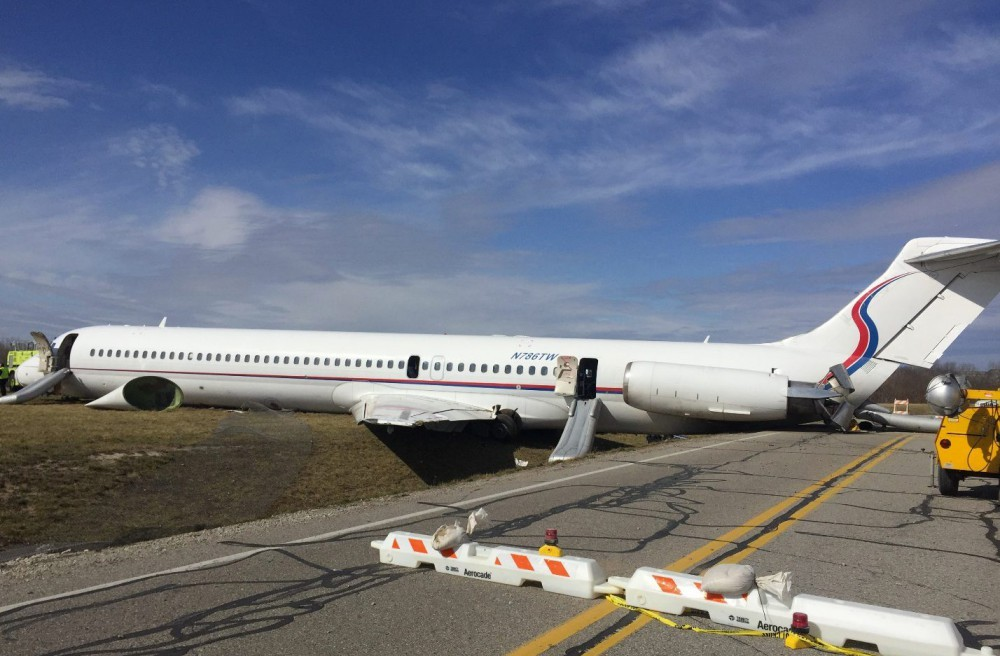
- The aircraft after overrunning the runway

Accident
- Date: March 8, 2017
- Summary: Runway overrun and crash following rejected takeoff
- Site: Willow Run Airport, Ypsilanti, Michigan, U.S.; 42.22814°N 83.54242°W

Aircraft
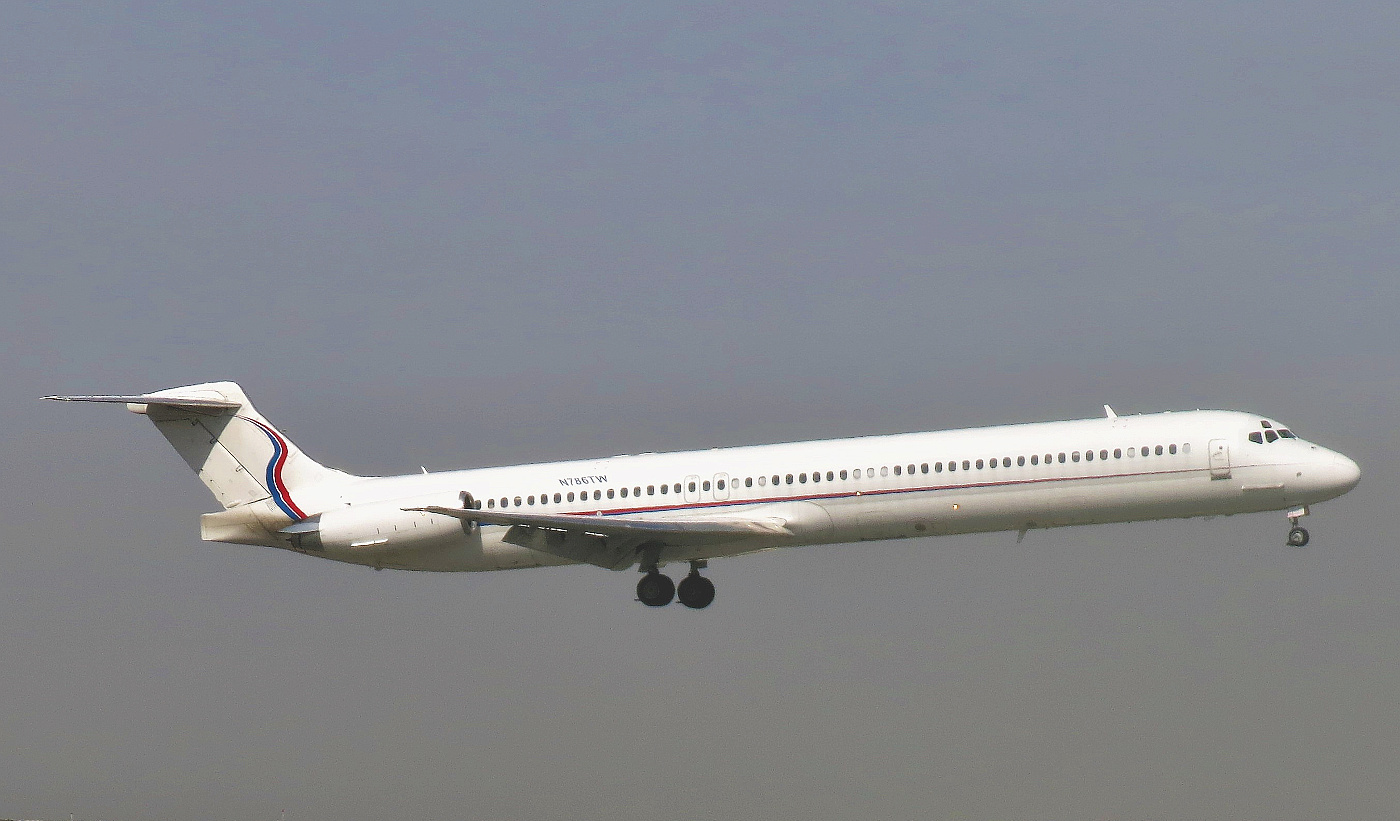
- N786TW, the aircraft involved in the accident, seen in 2016
- Aircraft type: McDonnell Douglas MD-83
- Operator: Ameristar Jet Charter
- IATA flight No.: 7Z9363
- ICAO flight No.: AJI9363
- Call sign: AMERISTAR 9363
- Registration: N786TW
- Flight origin: Willow Run Airport, Ypsilanti, Michigan, U.S.
- Destination: Dulles International Airport, Dulles, Virginia, U.S.
- Occupants: 116
- Passengers: 110
- Crew: 6
- Fatalities: 0
- Injuries: 1
- Survivors: 116

Ameristar Charters Flight 9363 was a charter flight from Willow Run Airport to Washington Dulles Airport. On March 8, 2017, the McDonnell Douglas MD-83 (DC-9-83) operating the flight rejected takeoff and overran the runway. The crash was caused by a jammed elevator, which was damaged by high winds the day before the crash.

All 116 passengers and crew survived the crash, with only one minor injury, but the aircraft was damaged beyond repair. The NTSB investigation found that the elevator was damaged while the aircraft was parked, and then was not noticed due to flaws in the aircraft's design and Ameristar's operating procedures.

== Accident ==
The aircraft had been chartered to transport the Michigan Wolverines men's basketball team to the Big Ten tournament in Washington, D.C. for the following day's game against the Illinois Fighting Illini. Prior to the flight, the aircraft had been parked at Willow Run Airport since it arrived from Lincoln Airport in Lincoln, Nebraska on March 6.

Hours before the accident, the air traffic control tower at Willow Run Airport had been evacuated due to high winds. The windstorm affected much of Southeast Michigan, and resulted in power outages for over 800,000 DTE customers. A power outage at Willow Run disabled most of the weather instrumentation in the airport's automated surface observing system (ASOS), and manual weather observations were also unavailable due to the evacuation of the control tower.

As a result, the flight crew of Flight 9363 obtained weather information from alternate sources, contacting company operations personnel for a temperature setting, and calling the nearby Detroit Metropolitan Airport on one of the pilots' cell phones to get the current weather information at the latter airport. (Note: Detroit Metropolitan Airport is 8 nmi to the east of Willow Run, close enough that - barring the presence of small-scale frontal or convective weather systems, which were not present on the day of the accident - the weather conditions at one of these two airports can reasonably be assumed to also reflect conditions at the other of the two.) Lacking information from the ASOS, the crew used windsocks at the airport to determine the predominant wind direction and inform their choice of runway. The flight crew modified their planned takeoff to protect against the danger of wind shear, selecting a higher rotation speed than would otherwise be prescribed.

The flight was delayed slightly, due to the communication difficulties caused by the power outages at the airport. Flight 9363 taxied uneventfully to runway 23L, and received its takeoff clearance from Detroit Metropolitan via cell phone due to the lack of ATC services at Willow Run. The check airman acting as pilot in command, 41-year-old Andreas Gruseus, directed the captain, 54-year-old Mark Radloff, to begin the takeoff roll, which began at 14:51:12 EST. (Note: The captain was transitioning to the MD-80, having previously flown older, smaller versions of the DC-9; although the MD-80 series is itself a version of the DC-9, it is sufficiently different from the older DC-9s to require that pilots moving from one to the other receive training on the differences between the two. As the captain was still undergoing differences training for the MD-80, the check airman was the pilot in command of the flight, although the captain was the pilot flying.) The takeoff roll was normal until rotation speed (V_{R}), at 150 knots (170 mph; 280 km/h) indicated airspeed (KIAS). At V_{R}, when the captain pulled back on the control column to rotate the aircraft, the aircraft failed to respond, even after the captain applied additional back force to the control column. Judging the aircraft to be incapable of flight, the captain performed a rejected takeoff, immediately applying maximum braking followed by spoilers and reverse thrust.

By the time the captain rejected the takeoff, the aircraft had accelerated to 173 knots (199 mph; 320 km/h), over 30 knots (35 mph; 56 km/h) above the decision speed (V_{1}), and was moving too fast to stop in the remaining runway distance. The aircraft ran off the end of the runway and across the grassy runway safety area (RSA), before striking the raised pavement of an access road along the airport perimeter. (Note: The RSA had been extended from its prior dimensions several years previously in order to bring it into compliance with accepted standards for RSA size and safety; the new, larger safety area was judged to have significantly increased the survivability of the accident by allowing additional space and time for the overrunning aircraft to decelerate. RSA improvements, finally carried out en masse by the Federal Aviation Administration in the early 2000s and early 2010s, had been the subject of numerous prior NTSB safety recommendations dating back to the 1980s.) Upon striking the road pavement, the aircraft's landing gear collapsed, and the aircraft slid on its belly over the road and a ditch just beyond, causing substantial damage to the belly and underside of the nose. The aircraft came to a stop with its empennage on the road and its nose in a grassy field on the far side of the road and ditch.

An orderly, rapid evacuation followed. The aircraft had 8 emergency exits, of which 4 were used. One emergency exit was rendered unusable by a faulty evacuation slide, and another was blocked by a seatbelt stuck in the door. All 110 passengers and 6 crew members survived the crash, with one injury, a passenger who suffered a laceration to the leg.

== Aircraft ==
The aircraft involved was a McDonnell Douglas MD-83 (DC-9-83), registration N786TW, manufacturer serial number (MSN) 53123, line number 1987. It was originally delivered to Avianca in April of 1992 and transferred to Ameristar in March of 2011. It was damaged beyond repair in the accident and written off aged 25 years.

== Investigation ==
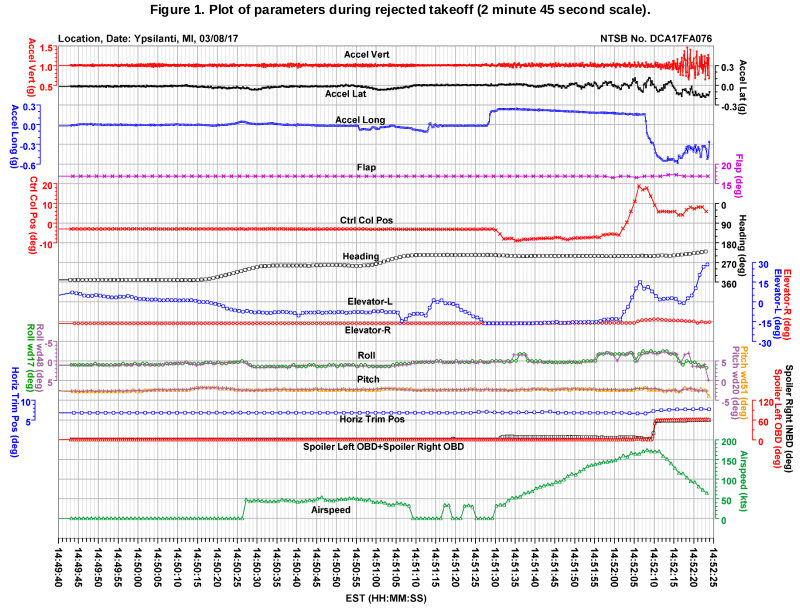
Recorded flight data from the attempted takeoff of Flight 9363.

=== Aircraft design ===
The crash occurred after the aircraft failed to rotate upwards, and the investigation focused on the aircraft's elevator system as a cause of the failure. The elevators of the MD-80 series aircraft are controlled indirectly via a system of servo tabs, using a design similar to the MD-80's predecessor, the DC-9.

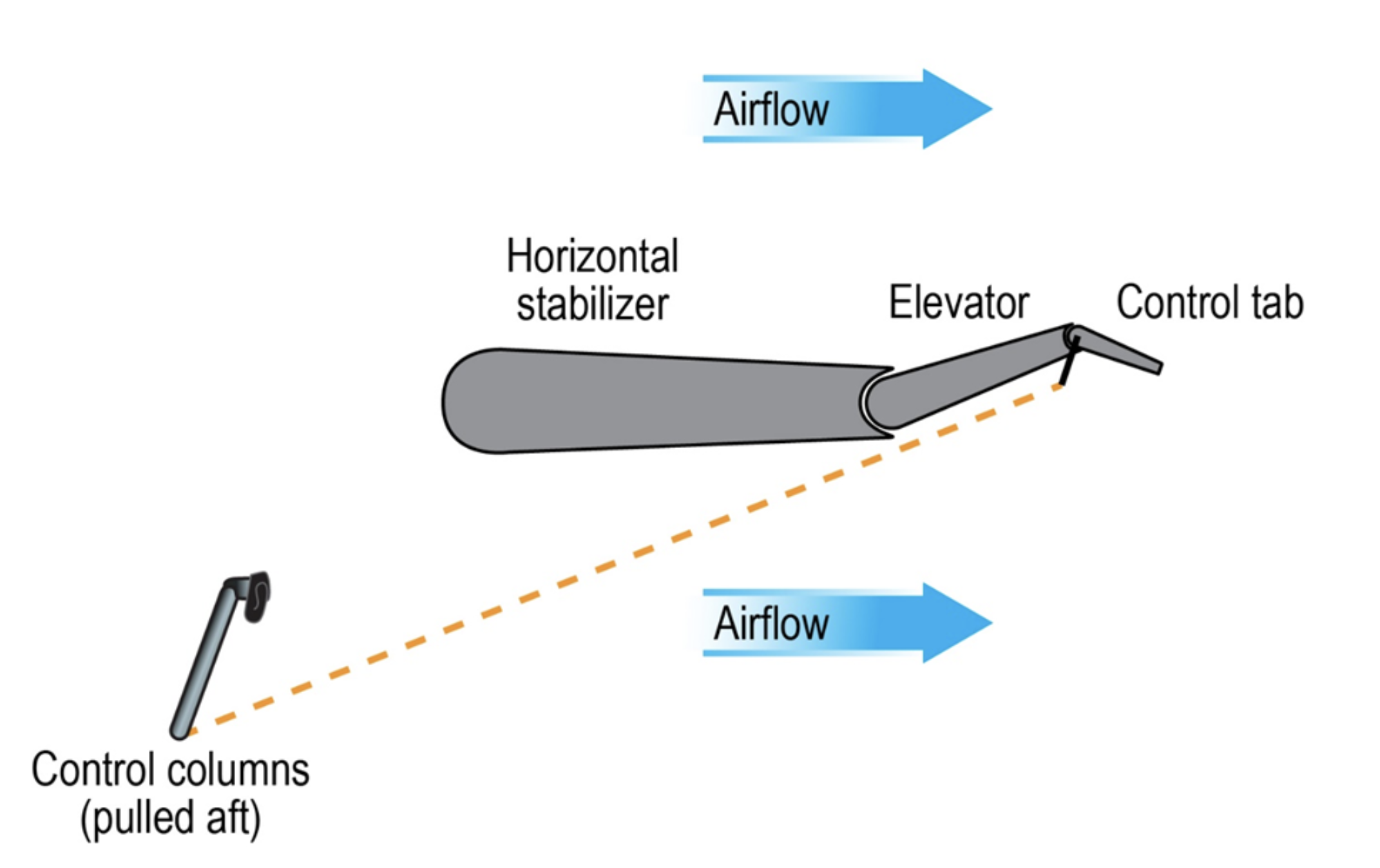
Diagram of the elevator control tab mechanism

During a normal takeoff in an MD-80 aircraft, the pilot rotates the aircraft off the runway by pulling the control column back (aft), which moves the elevator control tab into a trailing-edge-down (TED) position. The elevator control tab directs airflow around the elevator, and causes lift from forward airflow to move the elevators in the opposite direction of the tab. The elevator is in turn linked to two more servo tabs, including a geared tab that provides mechanical advantage to the pilot's control inputs. During takeoff, the pilot's commands through the control column, via the system of three servo tabs, ultimately moves the elevator into a trailing-edge-up (TEU) position. This affects the pitch angle of the aircraft, and rotates it up and off the runway.

As a consequence of this design, the elevators are not able to be moved during a typical preflight inspection, when the aircraft is stationary and there is no airflow over the elevators. A more thorough inspection of the elevators involves moving them by hand, but it requires a scissor lift (or similar equipment) to reach the top of the T-tail 30 ft (9.1 m) in the air, and is not typically performed during a preflight inspection. (Note: The elevators, and the positions thereof, are readily visible from the ground; however, low-intensity winds can easily move one or both elevators to their mechanical stops in either direction without causing damage, and an observation of an elevator in the full-TED position is, therefore, not, on its own, indicative of an elevator problem.)

Another consequence of the elevator system design is that when the aircraft is parked, the elevators move freely with the wind, within limits. The MD-80 is not equipped with a gust lock, which would prevent this motion. The range of motion of the elevator is constrained by stops, which are equipped with shock absorbers for protection. This system is designed to withstand high-speed airflow from straight ahead during flight, but strong forces from other directions can overcome the shock absorbers. If the linkages in the geared tab move too far, they can become "overcentered," jamming the elevator in place. The MD-80 was designed to withstand horizontal wind gusts of up to 65 knots (75 mph; 120 km/h) from any direction while on the ground.

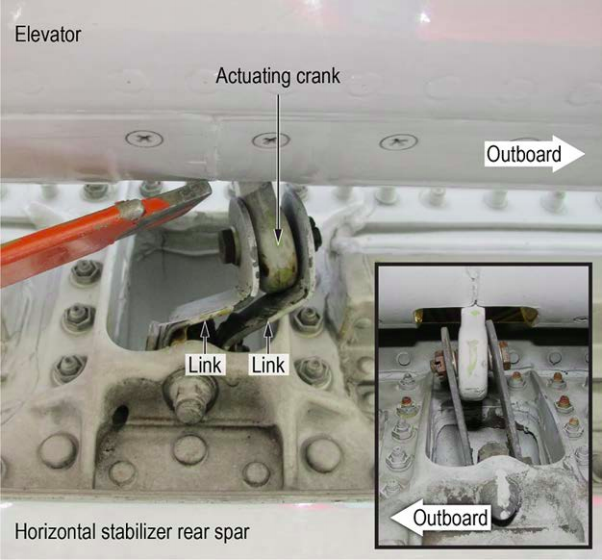
The inboard geared tab linkage of the accident aircraft's right elevator, showing the bent and damaged control linkage.

=== Postaccident condition of the control systems ===
When the aircraft was inspected on site following the accident, the right elevator was found to be jammed in a full trailing-edge-down (TED) position slightly beyond its normal limit of motion, and could not be moved by hand. The inboard control linkage of the right elevator's geared tab was damaged, being locked in an overcenter position, beyond its normal limit of travel, and with portions of the control linkage bent and displaced outboard. When the damaged linkage was disconnected by investigators, the elevator could be freely moved by hand from stop to stop. The cockpit controls could be moved throughout their full range of motion, and the control tabs were observed to move properly in response to control column inputs. (Note: During the postaccident inspection, some abnormal resistance to control-column movement was noted; however, this was determined to be the result of structural damage incurred during the accident sequence, which caused the elevator control cables (routed through the damaged area) to bind, and would not have been present prior to the collapse of the aircraft's landing gear.)

=== Company policies and maintenance ===
Ameristar's procedures were intended to protect aircraft from damage to flight controls from high winds. Per company policy, aircraft stored outside in winds of over 60 knots had to be parked facing into the wind. If aircraft had been exposed to wind gusts in excess of 65 knots from other than straight ahead while parked, a physical inspection of all flight control surfaces would have been required, including a check confirming that the control surfaces were free to move. Measurement equipment at Willow Run recorded maximum wind gusts of 55 knots (63 mph; 102 km/h), below both thresholds.

A review of elevator-position data from the aircraft's flight data recorder (FDR) showed that the right elevator moved properly on the morning of March 6, during a maintenance check. By the next time the aircraft was powered up, at 12:38 on the day of the accident, the right elevator was already at the full trailing-edge-down position, and remained there in all elevator-position data recorded during the preparations for the flight to Dulles. (Note: When the MD-80 is on the ground, its FDR records aircraft parametric data whenever at least one engine fuel switch is on and the aircraft's parking brake is disengaged. Between the March 6 maintenance check and the aircraft being powered up on March 8, the FDR did not record data. It also stopped recording three times during the preparations for the accident takeoff, coincident with the parking brake being applied.) In contrast, the left elevator moved several times throughout its full range of motion under the influence of ground winds. During the attempted takeoff, the left elevator followed the captain's commands, but the right elevator remained in the full trailing-edge-down position until partway through the attempted rotation, and then only moved slightly.

=== Prior elevator jam incident (Munich, 1999) ===
Prior to the Flight 9363 accident, the aircraft manufacturer had record of only one wind-induced elevator jam on any DC-9-series aircraft, which occurred at Munich Airport, Germany, in December 1999, and involved exposure to winds exceeding the elevator system's design limits.

In that incident, the airport had been subjected to a severe windstorm while the incident aircraft (another MD-83) was on the ground, with peak winds of up to 70 knots (81 mph; 130 km/h). This exceeded the manufacturer's mandatory inspection limits for the DC-9/MD-80 flight control system, and the flight crew requested an inspection of the aircraft's flight control system. A full inspection of the aircraft's elevators, which would have involved moving the elevators by hand, was not conducted due to personnel-safety concerns in the continuing high winds. (Note: Even had it been safe to perform, a physical inspection of the elevators would not have been required by the version of the aircraft maintenance manual (AMM) in force at the time; the AMM required an operational check of the aircraft's flight controls, but did not specify what form it should take. Following the Munich incident, Boeing updated the AMM to require that the elevators' ability to move be physically checked in circumstances such as these.) Instead, maintenance personnel had the flight crew perform a flight control check by moving the control column throughout its entire range of motion and checking for any abnormal resistance. (Note: This is a normal, routine procedure, performed prior to takeoff (along with similar tests of the rudder and aileron/spoileron controls) in all airplanes. Its primary purpose is to detect blockages or restrictions of the cockpit controls or of the flight control cables directly attached to them; for aircraft with hydraulically-, aerodynamically-, or electrically-driven control surfaces, it does not serve as positive verification that the control surfaces themselves are free to move.) No abnormalities were detected during this check, and the aircraft was released for flight. The aircraft was unable to rotate off the runway, and the flight crew were forced to reject the takeoff at very high speed. In this instance, the aircraft was safely brought to a stop on the runway.

The German Federal Bureau of Aircraft Accident Investigation (BFU) found that the Munich aircraft's left elevator was jammed in a full trailing-edge-down position, having been forced into that position by the high winds experienced on the ground. Boeing, as recommended by the BFU, instituted new procedures for DC-9, MD-80, and Boeing 717 operators, requiring inspections of elevator systems after aircraft were exposed to high winds on the ground. The threshold set was 65 knots (75 mph; 120 km/h) without the aircraft's nose pointed into the wind, and the requirements following exposure to winds below this threshold remained unchanged.

=== Wind field analysis and load testing of elevator system ===
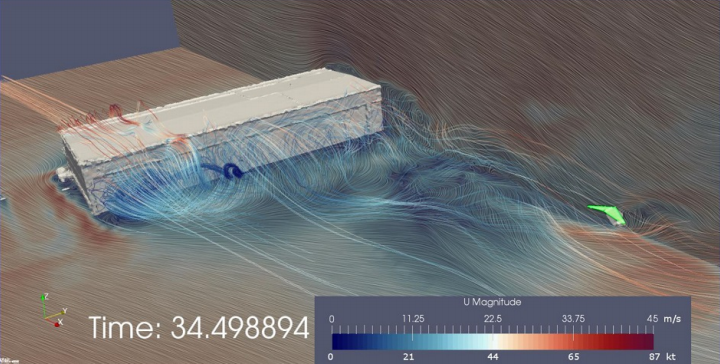
Computer simulation of the airflow downwind of the Willow Run hangar, showing turbulence generated by the hangar's presence; the horizontal and vertical tail surfaces of the parked accident aircraft are visible at the far right of the image.

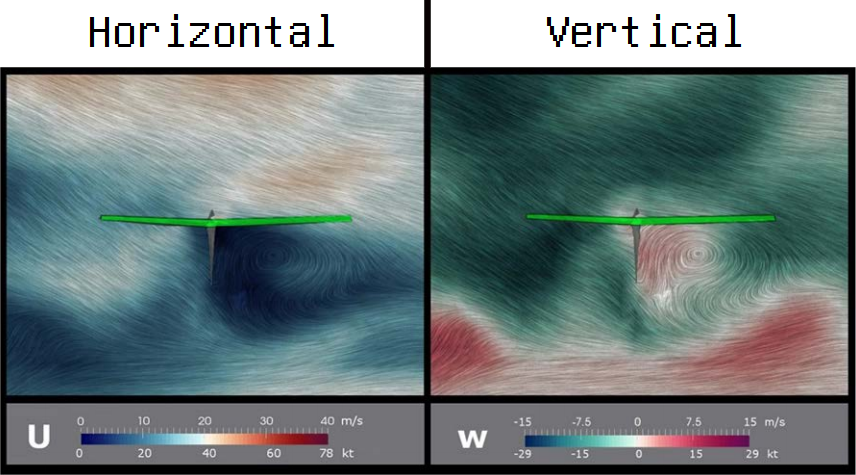
Computer simulation of the horizontal (left) and vertical (right) winds affecting the tail surfaces of the accident aircraft.

The aircraft in the Ameristar 9363 incident was damaged in the same way as the aircraft in Munich, but it was not subject to winds nearly as strong. Investigators identified a hangar immediately upwind of the aircraft's parking position as a potential cause of wind conditions that could have affected the aircraft. The investigators performed computational fluid dynamics (CFD) modeling of the wind field downwind of the hangar and around the parked aircraft, using a detailed three-dimensional model of the hangar obtained via drone imagery. (Note: This also had the beneficial side effect of preserving an exquisitely-detailed record of the historically-significant hangar (the last survivor of many such buildings erected at Willow Run during World War II to build heavy bomber aircraft), which was scheduled for demolition.)

The CFD analysis showed that the hangar had a significant impact on the local winds at the parked aircraft. A 55-knot (63 mph; 102 km/h) horizontal gust passing over the hangar was found to produce a 58-knot gust at the aircraft itself. The hangar also introduced significant turbulence, which produced vertical forces. These forces could slam the aircraft's elevators forcefully between their stops, potentially resulting in flight-control damage.

Video of dynamic load testing of the elevator system starting from the full-TEU position at simulated wind speeds of 55 and 60 knots (63 and 69 mph; 102 and 111 km/h). In the 60-knot test, the inboard geared-tab linkage can be seen to become locked overcenter.

To determine whether this theory was possible, the NTSB performed a series of static and dynamic load tests on the accident aircraft's undamaged horizontal stabilizers and left elevator. The tests, conducted at a Boeing laboratory in Huntington Beach, California, simulated the wind conditions calculated by the CFD analysis. The static tests consisted of hanging weights from the elevator while in its trailing-edge-down position, simulating constant wind speeds. Static testing resulted in no damage to the geared tab linkage (the damaged component of the accident aircraft), even at wind speeds of up to 75 knots (86 mph; 139 km/h).

The dynamic load tests simulated turbulence in the wind flow by lifting the elevator and dropping it. The investigators used the same quantity of weight as the static tests, simulating the same horizontal wind speeds with more fluctuation of vertical wind speed. A simulated 60-knot gust applied to the elevator in its full trailing-edge-up position, slamming down to its full TED position, was sufficient to overcenter the geared tab linkage. A simulated 70-knot gust was able to achieve similar effects from the elevator's neutral position.

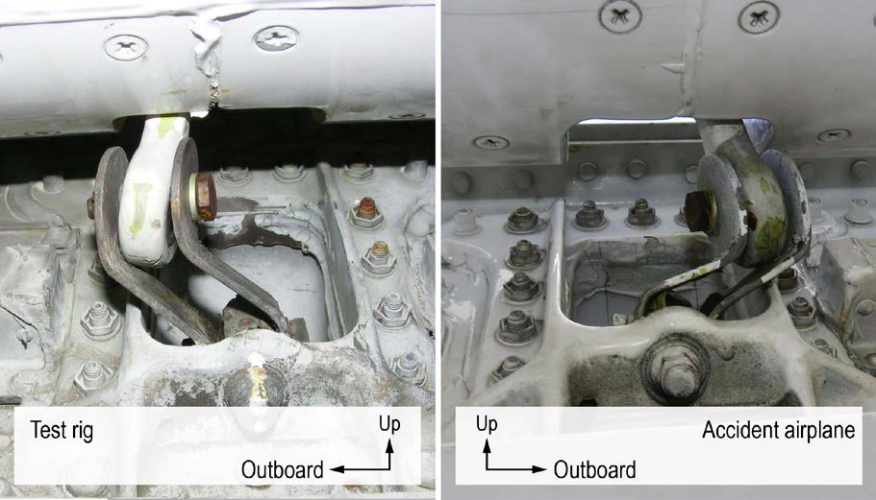
Damage produced by load testing of the elevator mechanism (left), compared with the damage seen on the accident aircraft (right).

As a final test, with the inboard geared-tab linkage of the test elevator locked in an overcenter position, a TEU force was applied to the elevator using the forklift, simulating the conditions during the takeoff roll. The overcentered links failed and bent outboard, in the same manner as the right elevator did during the takeoff roll.

=== Probable cause ===
The NTSB released their final report in February 2019, which concluded that

...the probable cause of this accident was the jammed condition of the airplane's right elevator, which resulted from exposure to localized, dynamic wind while the airplane was parked and rendered the airplane unable to rotate during takeoff. Contributing to the accident were (1) the effect of a large structure on the gusting surface wind at the airplane's parked location, which led to turbulent gust loads on the right elevator sufficient to jam it, even though the horizontal surface wind speed was below the certification design limit and maintenance inspection criteria for the airplane, and (2) the lack of a means to enable the flight crew to detect a jammed elevator during preflight checks for the Boeing MD-83 airplane. Contributing to the survivability of the accident was the captain's timely and appropriate decision to reject the takeoff, the check airman's disciplined adherence to standard operating procedures after the captain called for the rejected takeoff, and the dimensionally compliant runway safety area where the overrun occurred.

=== Pilots' actions ===
The report praised the actions of the flight crew for contributing to the lack of serious injuries or fatalities in the accident. In a press release on March 7th, 2019, NTSB chairman Robert Sumwalt stated "This is the kind of extreme scenario that most pilots never encounter – discovering that their plane won't fly only after they know they won't be able to stop it on the available runway. These two pilots did everything right after things started to go very wrong."

== Aftermath ==
The morning after the crash, the Wolverines men's basketball team traveled to Washington on the Detroit Pistons team plane. The team arrived at the Verizon Center in Washington at 10:30 AM, in time for their noon game against Illinois. The Wolverines played the game in their practice uniforms, as the team's luggage was still on the crashed plane. The Wolverines won against Illinois, 75–55, and went on to win the Big Ten tournament. Following their Big Ten tournament victory, the Wolverines advanced in the NCAA tournament, reaching the Sweet Sixteen round before losing to Oregon on March 24.

== Legacy ==
In response to the crash, Boeing developed a modification to the DC-9 elevator system, which would add a second stop to the elevator system. This secondary stop would physically prevent the elevator from moving far enough past its limits to allow the geared-tab linkages to become locked in an overcenter configuration. For DC-9s with tab-driven elevators not yet equipped with the secondary elevator stop, including DC-9s, MD-80s, and 717s, the maintenance manual was revised to decrease the wind strengths which would necessitate a physical inspection of the elevator system before further flight. The NTSB recommended that Boeing finalize and fully implement these changes, and also develop a means for DC-9 flight crews to detect an elevator jam before attempting to take off.

== See also ==
- 2021 Houston McDonnell Douglas MD-87 crash, an MD-80 runway excursion that resulted in the total destruction of the aircraft due to flight-control damage similar to Flight 9363
