= Martinaire =

American cargo airline

IATA	ICAO	Call sign
-	MRA	MARTEX
- Founded: 1978
- Hubs: Dallas/Fort Worth
- Secondary hubs: Capital Region International Airport (Lansing, Michigan)
- Focus cities: DFW, ADS, RDU, LAN
- Fleet size: 29
- Parent company: XWing
- Headquarters: Addison Airport; Addison, Texas, United States
- Key people: Brian Pottinger (Chief Pilot)
- Website: martinaire.com

Martinaire Aviation, L.L.C. is an American cargo airline based on the grounds of Addison Airport in Addison, Texas, United States, near Dallas. It operates feeder flights for overnight package delivery services, most notably on behalf of UPS. It is owned by Xwing.

Superior Aviation is an American airline based in Lansing, Michigan, United States. It was established in 1979 and operates scheduled passenger services, passenger and cargo charter flights and aircraft sales and maintenance. In 2006, Martinaire acquired Superior Aviation.

== History ==
The airline was established and started operations in 1978 and acquired the freight operations of CCAir on 2 January 1990. It was in turn bought by a group of investors led by The Acker Group in December 1993. In 2005, Martinaire acquired fellow package carrier Mid Atlantic Aviation. In 2006, Martinaire acquired Superior Aviation of Lansing, Michigan. In 2011, Martinaire began acquiring Beechcraft 1900 aircraft to replace the Fairchild Metroliner, a move completed by mid-2012. The Beech 1900 aircraft were later removed and sold to Alpine Air. As of January 2013, Martinaire is the second-largest single feeder carrier in the country.

== Fleet ==
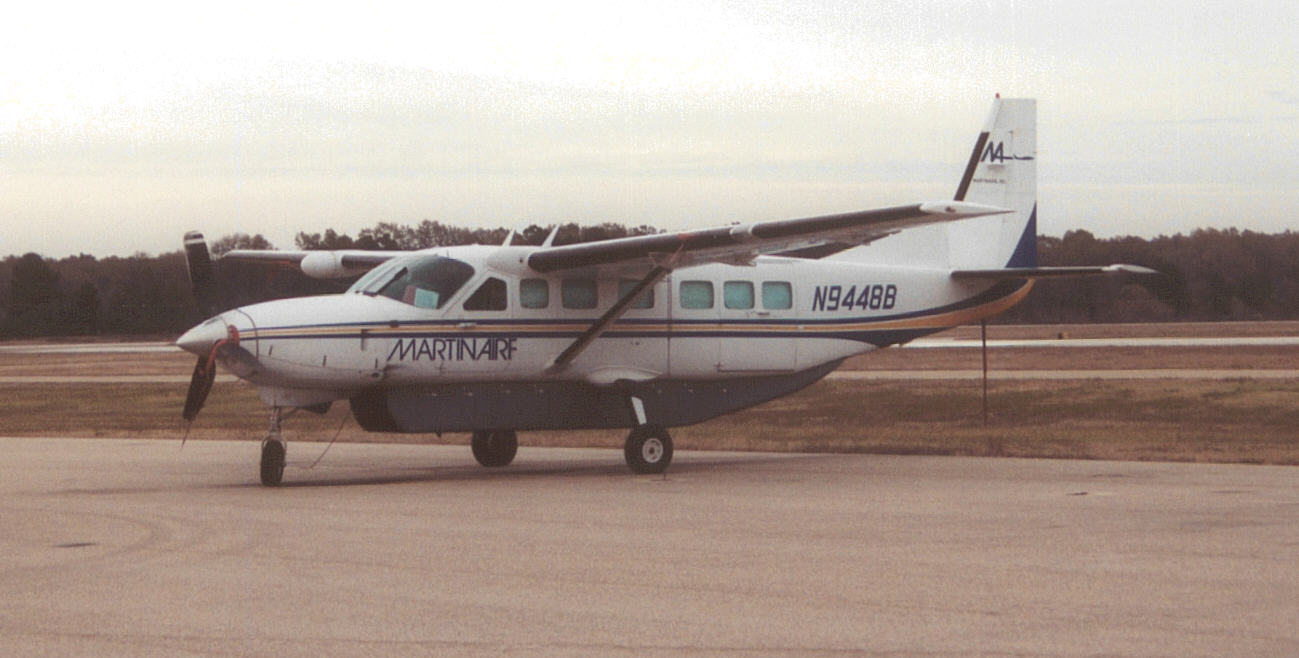
A former Martinaire Cessna 208. This aircraft would later be involved in an accident with Grant Aviation.

The Martinaire fleet consists of the following aircraft (as of April 2009):

- 29 Cessna 208B Super Cargomaster
