= Dallas Grand Prix =

Auto race held 1984–1996

- Fair Park, 1984

Race information
- Number of times held: 8
- First held: 1984
- Last held: 1996
- Most wins (drivers): (Canada) Ron Fellows (2) (United States) Irv Hoerr (2)
- Most wins (constructors): Chevrolet (2); Ford (2); Oldsmobile (2)
- Circuit length: 2.1 km (1.3 miles)
- Race length: 161.7 km (100.4 miles)
- Laps: 77

Last race (1996)

Pole position
- (Canada) Ron Fellows; Chevrolet; 55.624

Podium
- 1. (Canada) Ron Fellows; Chevrolet; 1:19:44.298; 2. (United States) Tommy Kendall; Ford; +11.059; 3. (United States) Boris Said; Ford

Fastest lap
- (Canada) Ron Fellows; Chevrolet; 55.742

The Dallas Grand Prix was a series of auto races held at temporary street circuits in the vicinity of Dallas starting in 1984. The inaugural 1984 event was a round of the Formula One World Championship and took place in Fair Park, near downtown Dallas. The 1985 race was cancelled due to financial problems, safety concerns, and citizen complaints stemming from the venue's close proximity to residential neighborhoods. In 1988, the race was revived as a round of the Trans-Am Series. In 1989, the event moved to the northern Dallas suburb of Addison. After a one-year hiatus in 1992, the event returned to Dallas at a new street circuit around Reunion Arena, and was last held in 1996.

== Formula 1 ==
The 1984 Dallas Grand Prix was conceived as a way to demonstrate Dallas's status as a "world-class city". The Formula One (F1) race took place on July 8, 1984 on a temporary street circuit in Fair Park, despite pre-race organizational problems, intense 100 °F (38 °C) heat, and poor track conditions including pavement failures. Of the 26 cars that started the race, only eight finished, and the race is perhaps best known for driver Nigel Mansell collapsing from exhaustion while trying to push his broken car to the finish line. In a 2022 statement to D Magazine, co-organizer Larry Waldrop said that the July date was chosen to minimize the possibility of rain during the event, and he expressed regret that the organizers did not adequately anticipate the effects of Texas summer heat on the event generally and the pavement specifically.

Financial problems and safety concerns contributed to the 1985 race being cancelled. Race organizer Dallas Grand Prix of Texas Inc., founded by Waldrop, Don Walker, and Buddy Boren, had executed a contract with the Formula One Constructors' Association (FOCA) to hold five races in Dallas. Walker, a local real estate investor, bought out Boren's share in late 1983 and sidelined Waldrop. Walker clashed with co-organizers and officials and spent money prodigiously. Walker could not agree with FOCA or Dallas officials on a 1985 race date, and the company would not pay the front money for the race. Around this time, Walker suddenly withdrew from Can-Am racing citing financial reasons, was forced off the corporate boards of two banks over alleged financial irregularities, and began selling his large collection of exotic sports cars. Both Walker and Dallas Grand Prix of Texas Inc. ended up in financial distress and were soon under investigation by the U.S. Federal Bureau of Investigation and Securities and Exchange Commission over allegations that Walker had illegally siphoned money from the company and various real estate ventures to fund his lavish lifestyle. Waldrop negotiated with FOCA leader Bernie Ecclestone in late 1984 in an attempt to bypass Walker and revive the event, but the effort came to naught. Dallas Grand Prix of Texas Inc. entered bankruptcy in March 1985, ending any possibility that a follow-on F1 race would take place at Fair Park.

Another major factor in the cancellation of future F1 races was pushback from residents of the nearby, populous Fair Park neighborhood, which was majority Black and low-income. Although the Dallas Black Chamber of Commerce said the event would benefit some local Black-owned businesses, the organization and Dallas city councilwoman Diane Ragsdale said they had been excluded from the planning process, and Ragsdale told The New York Times that the failure to consult with neighbors and take noise concerns seriously were part of a historic pattern of "total disrespect for the neighborhood." In 1984, Ragsdale and the Dallas Black Chamber of Commerce filed a lawsuit against Walker and Dallas Grand Prix of Texas Inc.; in 2022, Waldrop said that it was the main hurdle in his late 1984 FOCA negotiations, because he could not guarantee that authorities would allow the 1985 race to take place.

== Trans-Am era ==
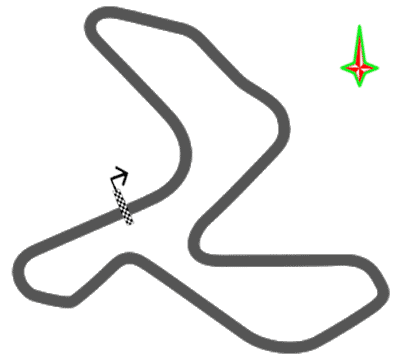
Shortened Fair Park circuit layout, used for Trans-Am Series race in 1988

Boren was eventually able to organize a 1988 Trans-Am Series race at Fair Park after reaching an agreement with Ragsdale and the Dallas Black Chamber of Commerce to donate a substantial portion of the race receipts to charity.

Continued complaints about noise and inconvenience from nearby Fair Park homeowners led organizers to seek a less noise-sensitive venue. They decided on Addison Airport, located in a largely industrial area in the nearby town of Addison. The 1989 event was held on May 12–14 on a new temporary 2.53 km (1.57 mi) circuit built partially on public streets and partially on taxiways and the south end of the runway. Although it benefited Addison hotels and restaurants, the race disrupted operations at the busy airfield for weeks, prompting airport businesses and the airport management company to lodge complaints with the town and the Federal Aviation Administration (FAA) in 1990. After the 1991 race, the FAA, the town, the race organizers, and airport managers and tenants agreed that 1992 would be the last year the race would be held at the airport. The agreement became moot when the race organizers, who had lost money on the previous events, cancelled the 1992 race citing financial reasons.

In 1993, the race relocated to a temporary street circuit around the Reunion Arena, at the time home to many of Dallas's sports teams.

== Winners ==
A pink background indicates an event which was not part of the Formula One World Championship.

Year	Driver	Constructor	Location	Class	Report
1984	(Finland) Keke Rosberg	Williams-Honda	Fair Park	Formula One	Report
1985 – 1987	Not held				
1988	(United States) Hurley Haywood	Audi	Fair Park	Trans-Am	Report
1989	(United States) Dorsey Schroeder	Ford	Addison Airport	Trans-Am	Report
1990	(United States) Irv Hoerr	Oldsmobile	Addison Airport	Trans-Am	Report
1991	(United States) Irv Hoerr	Oldsmobile	Addison Airport	Trans-Am	Report
1992	Not held				
1993	(United States) Jack Baldwin	Chevrolet	Reunion Arena	Trans-Am	Report
1994	(Canada) Ron Fellows	Ford	Reunion Arena	Trans-Am	Report
1995	Not held				
1996	(Canada) Ron Fellows	Chevrolet	Reunion Arena	Trans-Am	Report

== See also ==
- List of Formula One Championship events
- United States Grand Prix
- Grand Prix of America
