= 2021 Houston McDonnell Douglas MD-87 crash =

2021 aviation accident in Texas

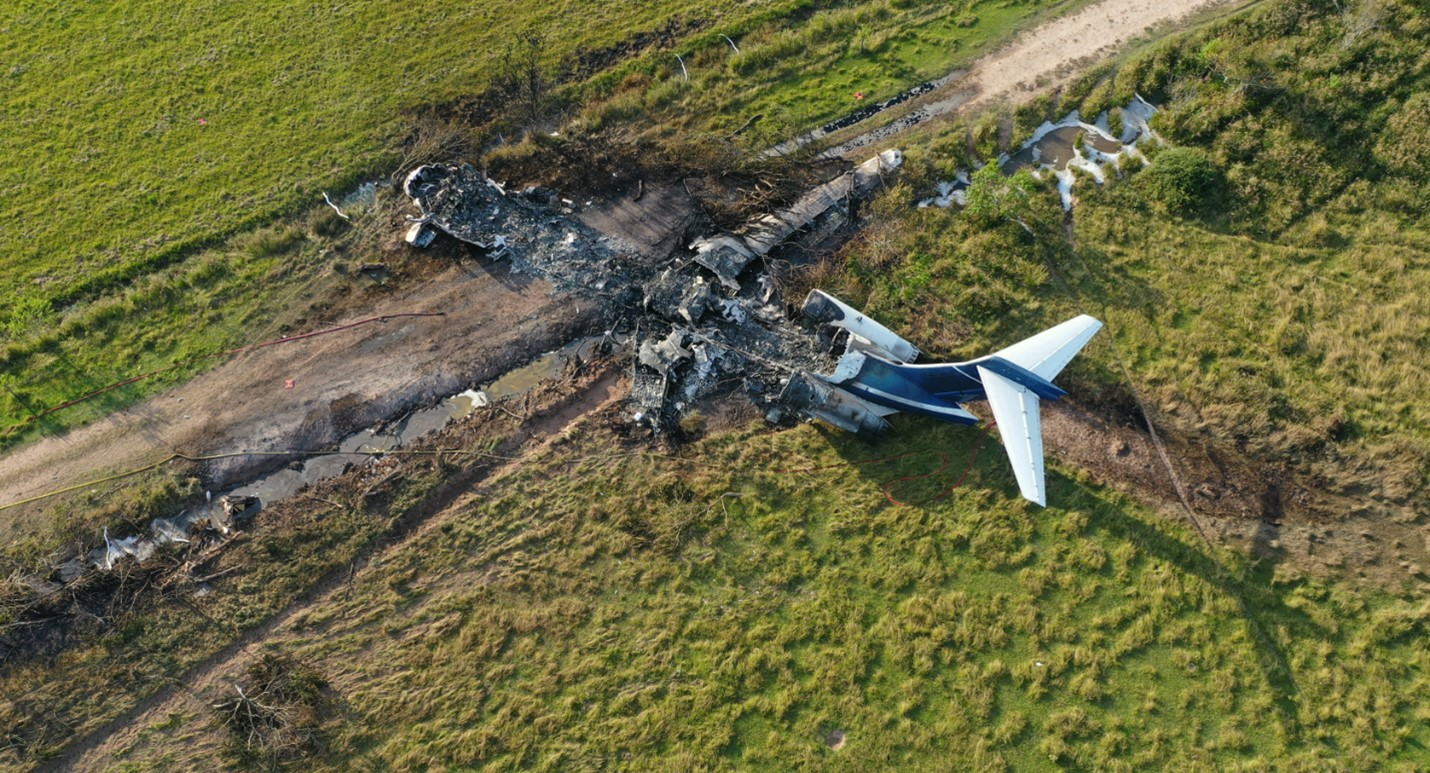
- Wreckage of the aircraft after overrunning the runway

Accident
- Date: October 19, 2021
- Summary: Runway overrun and crash following rejected takeoff
- Site: Houston Executive Airport, Katy, Texas, United States; 29.818°N 95.898°W

Aircraft
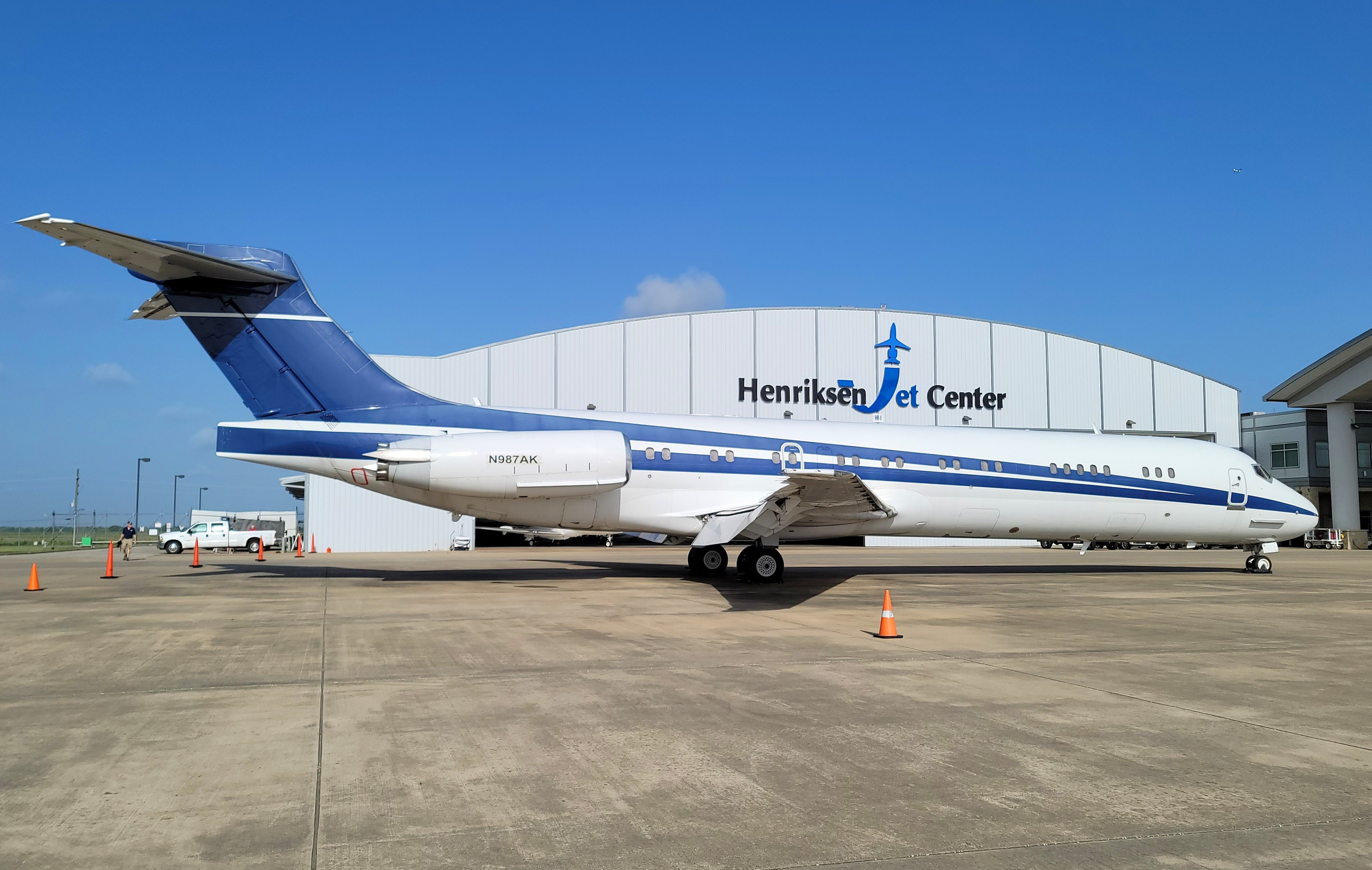
- N987AK, the aircraft involved in the accident, seen in August 2021
- Aircraft type: McDonnell Douglas MD-87
- Operator: 987 Investments LLC
- Registration: N987AK
- Flight origin: Houston Executive Airport
- Destination: Logan International Airport
- Occupants: 23
- Passengers: 19
- Crew: 4
- Fatalities: 0
- Injuries: 3
- Survivors: 23

On October 19, 2021, a corporate McDonnell Douglas MD-87, registered as N987AK, crashed and caught fire during take-off, 1,600 feet (500 m) from Houston Executive Airport. Those on board, 19 passengers and four crew members, were safely evacuated. The aircraft was destroyed.

== Aircraft and crew ==
The aircraft was a 33-year-old McDonnell Douglas MD-87, registered as N987AK. It was originally delivered to Finnair in 1988 as OH-LMB. Sold to Aeroméxico in 2000 as N204AM, it then passed through several other airlines before entering into service in a corporate configuration with 987 Investments LLC, as N987AK, in 2015.

The pilot flying was 67-year-old Captain Jeffrey "JJ" Reed, with an estimated total flight time of 22,000 hours, 4,000 of them were on the McDonnell Douglas MD-87; The pilot monitoring was 46-year-old First Officer Eli Rohl; he had nearly 10,000 hours of flight time, with 700 hours of experience on the MD-87.

== Flight ==
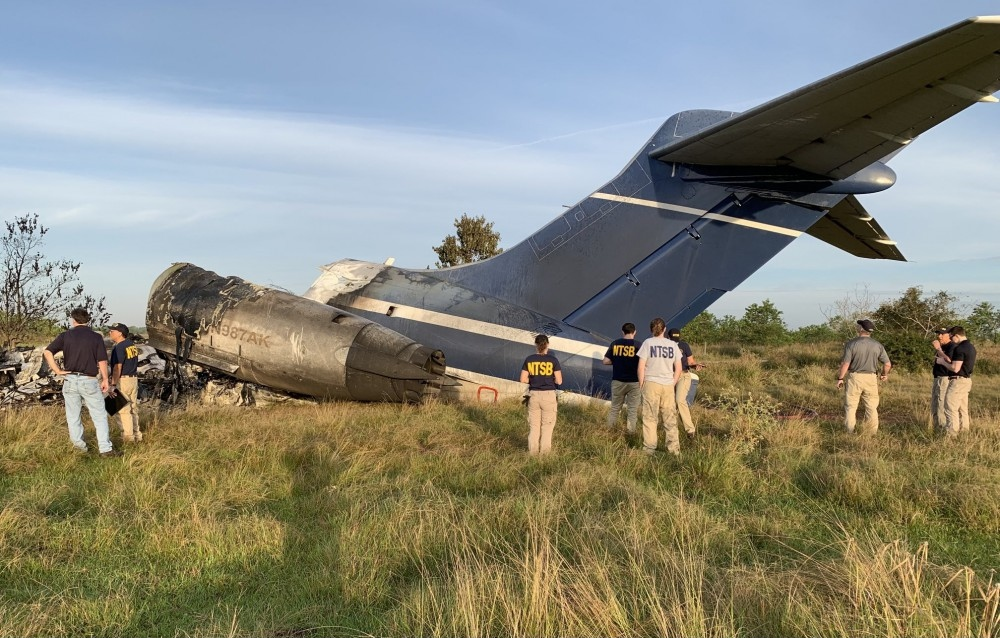
Ground view of the tail

The aircraft was on a charter flight from Brookshire, Texas, to Boston, Massachusetts, as the passengers were destined to see the Houston Astros play in Boston vs the Boston Red Sox baseball team in the 2021 American League Championship Series. The aircraft was taking off at 10:00 a.m. from Runway 36 when it overshot the runway, ran into a fence and a powerline before coming to a halt, 500 meters (1,600 ft; 550 yd) from the runway. It immediately caught fire. All 23 occupants onboard escaped from the burning aircraft safely. Two passengers received serious injuries while one other passenger received minor injuries. Emergency services took action with fire retardants and successfully controlled the flames from the wreckage. The aircraft burned down with only the tail-section left intact.

== Investigation ==
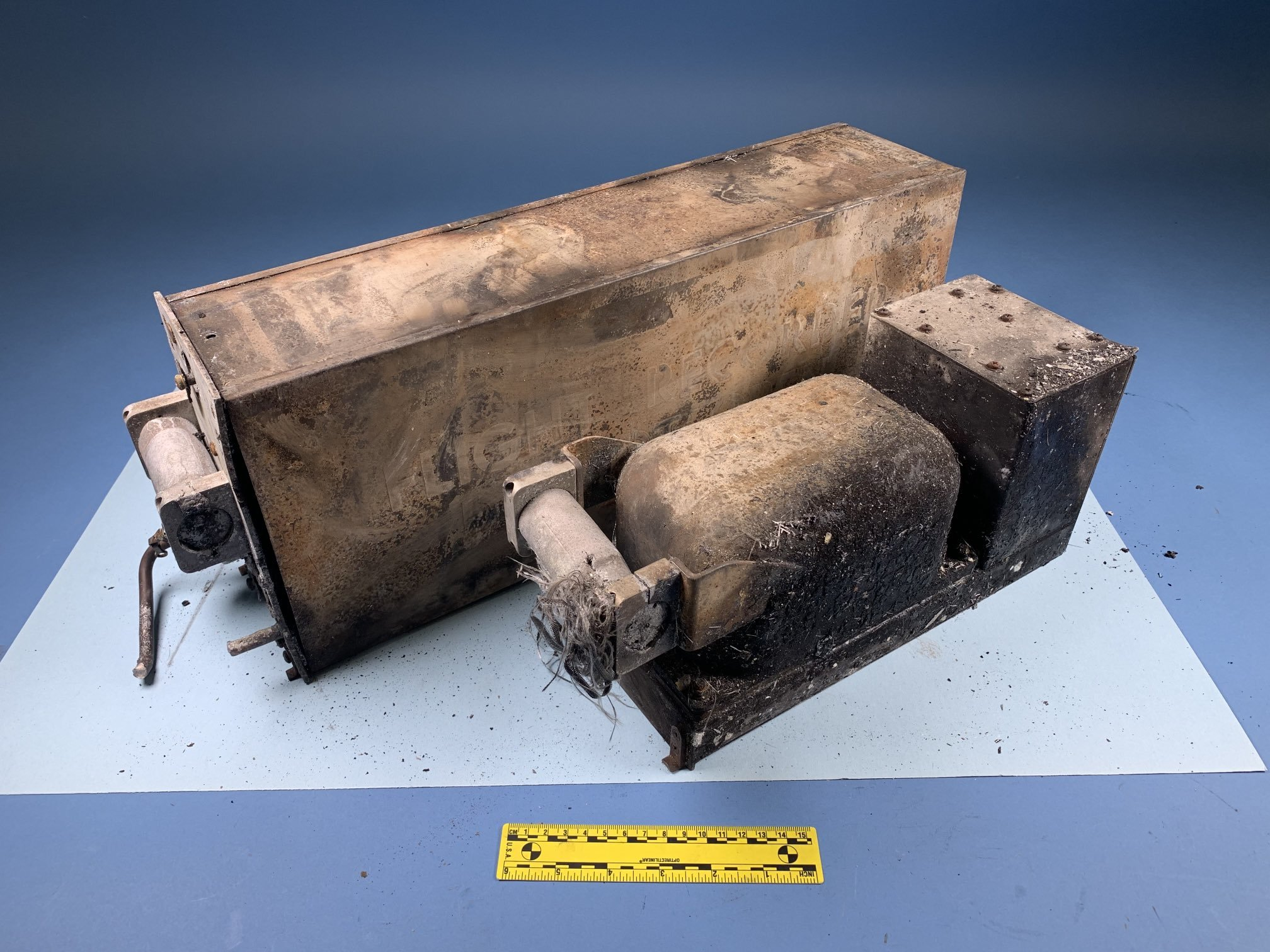
The aircraft's flight data recorder (left) and cockpit voice recorder (right)

The National Transportation Safety Board (NTSB) investigated the accident. The fire-damaged flight data recorders were retrieved from the wreckage of N987AK. In November, the NTSB revealed that both the aircraft's elevators were found to be jammed in the down position. A similar condition had been found in the crash of Ameristar Charters Flight 9363, an MD-83, four years earlier.

=== Probable cause ===
On September 28, 2023, the NTSB released the probable cause of the accident. The NTSB stated the jammed elevators prevented the airplane from rotating during the takeoff. The jammed elevators condition was caused by dynamic high wind while parked like the Ameristar Charters Flight 9363 accident in 2017. Following the 2017 accident, Boeing recommended revised preflight procedures to detect jammed elevators. Despite the revised recommendation the first officer did not follow the revised procedures due to his unawareness of the updated procedures. Everts Air Cargo, his primary employer, did not download nor were even aware of the Boeing bulletin.

Following the accident, Everts Air Cargo updated their manuals and pilot training to detect elevator jamming events.

== See also ==
- Ameristar Charters Flight 9363, 2017 accident involving jammed elevators under similar conditions.
- American Airlines Flight 1420
- Caspian Airlines Flight 6936
- YAK-Service Flight 9633
