= Xwing (aviation) =

Xwing is an autonomous aircraft company founded in 2016, initially focusing on cargo operations.

The company was founded by Marc Piette (former CEO) and Maxime Gariel (CTO). It received a $4 million seed round in 2018 led by Eniac Ventures, and a $10 million Series A in May 2020 led by R7 Partners, also including funding from Thales Group. Its staff also includes Earl Lawrence, formerly at the FAA in unmanned aircraft and aircraft certification.

In 2020, the company performed a four-hour fully autonomous flight, and was performing gate-to-gate autonomous operations in February 2021. In October 2022, the company announced NASA's Aeronautics Research Mission Directorate awarded a contract to share data and study autonomous flights in the national airspace.

Xwing operates N101XW, a Cessna 208 Caravan under an experimental license with its autonomous system.

The company acquired Airpac Aviation, a cargo feeder.

The company acquired Martinaire, another cargo feeder, in 2022.

The Autonomy Division of Xwing was acquired by Joby Aviation in June 2024.
