= Houston Executive Airport =

Airport in Houston, Texas, United States

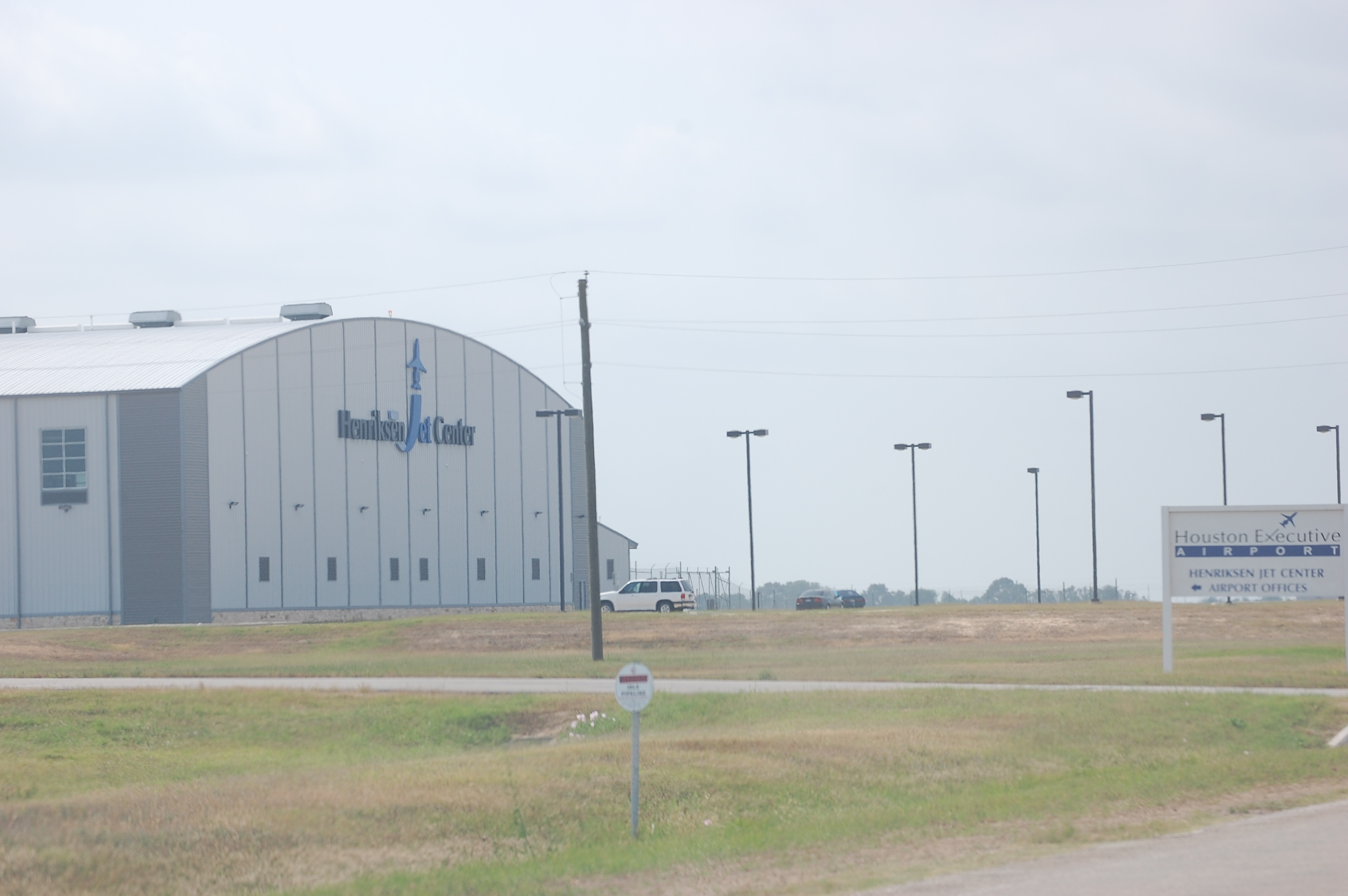
- IATA: none; ICAO: KTME; FAA LID: TME

Summary
- Airport type: Public
- Owner: WCF, LLC
- Serves: Greater Houston and Greater Katy
- Location: Waller County, Texas
- Opened: January 2007; 19 years ago
- Elevation AMSL: 166 ft (51 m)
- Coordinates: 29°48′18″N 095°53′52″W
- Website: www.houstonexecutiveairport.com

Map
- Location within Texas

Runways
| Direction | Length | | Surface |
| Direction | ft | m | Surface |
|---|---|---|---|
| 18/36 | 6,610 | 2,015 | Asphalt |
- Sources: FAA and airport website

Houston Executive Airport (ICAO: KTME, FAA LID: TME, formerly 78T) is a public-use airport in unincorporated Waller County, Texas, United States. The airport is located 28 nmi (52 km) west of Downtown Houston and it is in proximity to Brookshire. The airport is privately owned by WCF, LLC, which is based in Waller County.

Although many U.S. airports use the same three-letter location identifier for the FAA and IATA, Houston Executive Airport is assigned TME by the FAA but has no designation from the IATA.

== History ==
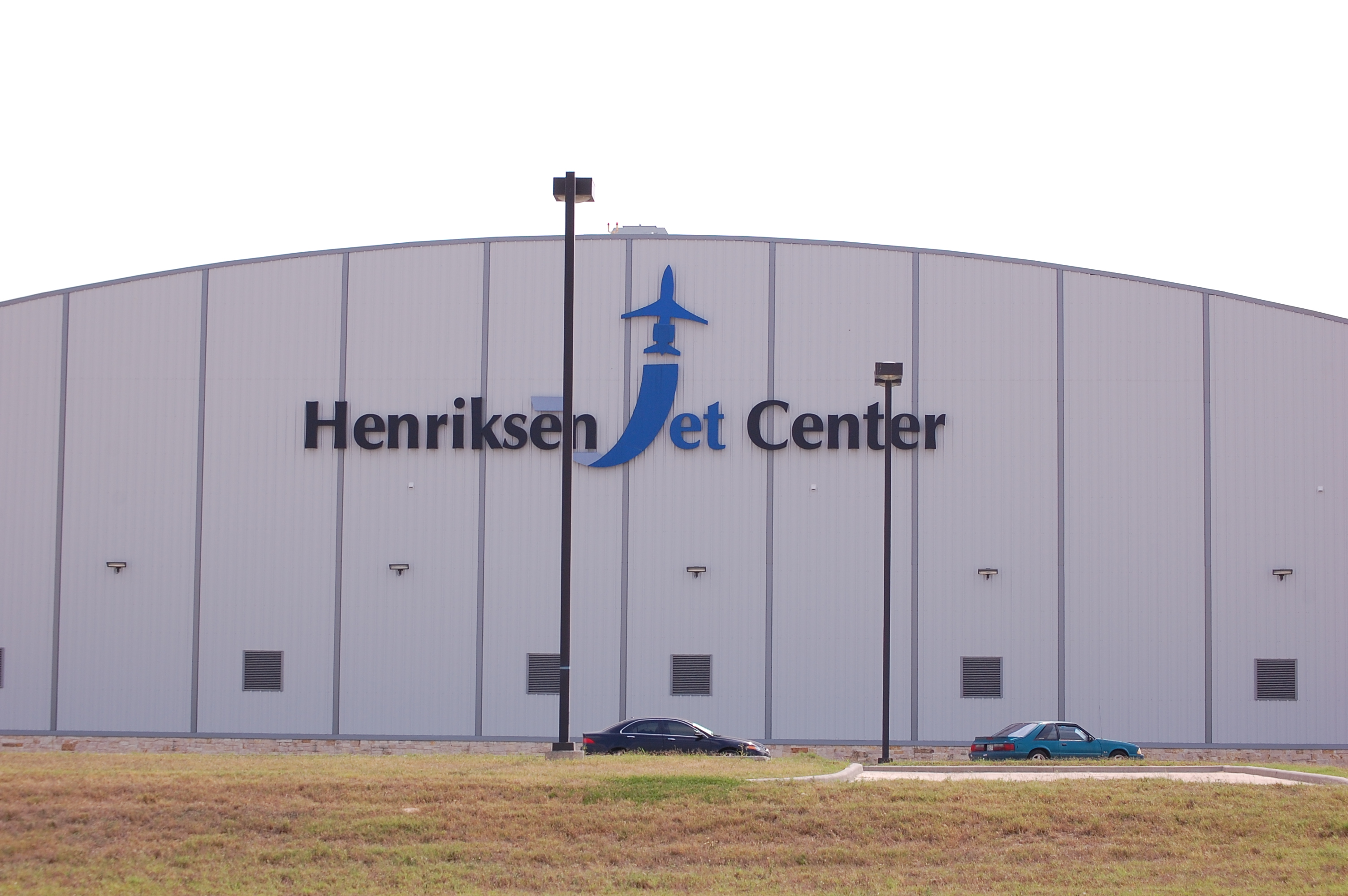
Main hangar at the Airport

The airport, which opened in January 2007, was funded by Ron Henriksen, an area businessman and pilot. Henriksen said that the airport's business plan caters to businesses based in the Energy Corridor area of Houston. Andrew Perry, the airport's executive director, said in February 2007 that the airport could compete with Sugar Land Regional Airport in Sugar Land, Texas, and that the airport's proximity to Interstate 10 and Energy Corridor businesses were the airport's greatest advantages. Lance LaCour, the council president and chief executive officer of the Katy Area Economic Development Council, said that the group intended to promote and help increase business at the airport since the group believed that the airport could help the council attract new industries to its area and retain existing industries in its area. By June 2007, the airport has around 50 flight operations per working week and up to 80 flight operations per weekend block. Alan Clark, the transportation planning director for regional planning group Houston-Galveston Area Council, said that the data suggests that leisure travelers use the airport more often than corporate travel.

By June 2007, the airport started construction on a 48,000-square-foot (4,500 m^{2}) service center. The center, scheduled to open in 2008, has a business center, a crew lounge, a 26,000-square-foot (2,400 m^{2}) hangar, a weather briefing room, and other facilities.

In 2011, Ron Henriksen opened Austin Executive Airport, located approximately 93 miles (150 km) northwest of Houston Executive Airport. The terminal buildings of both airports intentionally share very similar design stylings and amenities.

== Accidents and incidents ==
- On October 19, 2021, a privately operated McDonnell Douglas MD-87 jetliner crashed on take-off. All 21 people on board survived but the aircraft was completely destroyed by a post-crash fire. The plane had a load of 18 passengers and 3 crew members who were flying to Boston, Massachusetts, to watch the Houston Astros baseball team play the Boston Red Sox in a 2021 ALCS MLB baseball playoffs game.

== Facilities ==
Houston Executive Airport covers an area of 1,280 acres (520 ha) at an elevation of 166 feet (51 m) above mean sea level. It has one asphalt paved runway designated 18/36 which measures 6,610 by 100 feet (2,015 by 30 m).

== See also ==
- List of airports in Texas
