= Flight Express, Inc. =

Airline of the United States

Flight Express
IATA	ICAO	Call sign
—	FLX	FLIGHT EXPRESS
- Founded: 1985; 41 years ago
- Ceased operations: 2013; 13 years ago
- Hubs: Nashville International Airport; Orlando Executive Airport; Birmingham-Shuttlesworth International Airport; Addison Airport; Tampa International Airport; Opa-locka Airport; Fort Lauderdale Executive Airport; Little Rock National Airport; Fulton County Airport; Charles B. Wheeler Downtown Airport; St. Louis Downtown Airport
- Focus cities: Addison, Texas Nashville, Tennessee
- Fleet size: 84
- Headquarters: Orlando, Florida
- Website: http://www.flightexpress.com/

Flight Express, Inc. was a cargo airline owned by Bayside Capital. Bayside Capital acquired Flight Express on November 4, 2008. Flight Express, Inc. operates as an air courier company in the Southeast and Midwest United States. It offers air freight and ground courier services. The company also operates aircraft. It specializes in the transport of cargo for banking and financial institutions, life sciences organizations, newspaper publishers, overnight freight delivery companies, and payroll and photographic processors. It operates 84 aircraft from facilities in eight states. It was founded in 1985 and is based in Orlando, Florida, United States.

== History ==
Flight Express originally started as a company named Chapman Air in May 1978. James E. Chapman started his FAR-135 operation with two aircraft, a Cherokee Six and a Cessna Skyhawk, with a base at KORL in Orlando Florida. In the early days of the company aircraft were tied down in a grassy area to the east of Hangar 191 at KORL. (28 33 01.21 N, 81 20 19.19 W) The main source of business revenue was flying bank documents, cancelled checks, and photographic materials under contract for the Pony Express Courier Corporation throughout Florida.

In 1982 the company moved to the east ramp at KORL and opened a small aircraft maintenance facility. (28 33 02.54 N, 81 19 35.15 W) This first facility was actually one of the recently constructed "T" hangars located on the ramp. By this time the fleet had expanded to ten aircraft. By the end of 1984, Chapman Air was operating a fleet of 20 aircraft consisting of PA-32s, C-210s, M-20s and C-172s, logging over 14,000 total flight hours annually. The company now employed sixteen pilots, and two full-time mechanics.

On April 1, 1985, Chapman moved its operation to the larger Hangar 190 located at 3614 E Amelia St, on ORL. (28 33 01.11 N, 81 20 21.62 W) The company was still doing well and at this time the maintenance staff had increased to three full-time mechanics, and a larger business office was added inside the hangar.

On November 1, 1985, Jim Chapman sold his company, lock, stock, and barrel, to a group of investors and the company became known as Flight Express, Inc. John Kirchhoefer, one of the investors, became the President of the new company. The Director of Operations at this time was Brian Smith and the Director of Maintenance was Edward Redfield. The organization continued to grow and prosper and in the first quarter of 1993 the company took over a "sister" hangar (Hangar 191) to the east of its operation and doubled its floor space. A larger parts room was constructed and a maintenance library, break room and sales office were also added.

By the early 1990s Flight Express was operating over 50 aircraft and employed over 100 people. The fleet was logging more than 39,000 flight hours annually. A full-time Flight Control/Dispatch Department was staffed 24-hrs to control crew schedules and to dispatched and monitored flights. The mainstay of their business continued to be the transportation of banking materials and cancelled checks.

In 1995 Flight Express established FLX Courier Systems. FLX was a ground courier company and was a natural progression for the company. FLX Courier Systems augmented Flight Express's air courier fleet and could now move parcels door-to-door instead of airport-to-airport.

By the mid-1990s the air network covered much of the Southeast US. Flight Express began to acquire leaseholds in other locations to support the fleet. The first was Tampa Florida with a maintenance hangar and an above ground fuel farm on KTPA. (27 58 23.59 N, 82 31 06.58 W) It was during this period the company began to acquire some competing air-courier companies as well. With each acquisition the fleet and air network grew.

Flight Express was acquired by Bayside Capital (a financial holding company) in Oct 2008. The company continued to operate as “Flight Express” from its original base at the Orlando Executive Airport for another 5-years. After the purchase, Bayside Capital began the process of merging Flight Express with an existing FAR-135 courier operation they already owned called Airnet Systems in Columbus, OH. It took 5-years to fully complete the merger and on 30 April 2013 the Orlando facilities that once served as the base and headquarters of Flight Express, permanently closed. For a time, Airnet continued using the “Flight Express” name, mainly in the form of an Internet web site. However, the name no longer appears in any Airnet advertising or branding. The exact date Airnet ceased using the name “Flight Express” is not known.

== Fleet ==
The Flight Express, Inc. fleet consists the following aircraft (as of 4 September 2012):

Flight Express, Inc. Fleet:
Aircraft	In Fleet	Orders	Notes
Cessna 210	58	0
Beechcraft Baron	26	0

== Accidents and incidents ==
- January 15, 1985, in Floridana, Florida, Piper PA-32-300, N1496X, injuries: 1 uninjured: During cruise flight, the pilot noted the engine was vibrating severely and spraying oil and then failed. Examination of the engine revealed that the #2 cylinder connecting rod had failed in overload. A small piece of gear tooth was found inside the engine and it exhibited evidence of fatigue failure modes. The loose gear tooth was free to move through the engine cavity and initiate other failures. Probable cause was total failure engine connecting rod.
- August 5, 1985, Longwood, Florida, Cessna 210L, N1752X, Injuries: 1 Uninjured: The aircraft was 12 miles out & cleared for a visual approach when the pilot reported total loss of eng power. Examination of the wreckage disclosed about four fluid ounces of fuel remaining in fuel tanks. Entry on maintenance discrepancy sheet read 'fuel gauges are 100% unreliable. Check tanks visually.’ Probable cause(s): Fuel exhaustion. Contributing Factors: Inadequate PIC preflight.
- October 4, 1985 in Jacksonville, Florida, Piper PA-32-300, N8614N, Injuries: 1 Uninjured: After departure flight experienced loss of engine power and visible smoke coming from the windshield exhaust ducts. The engine subsequently failed but the pilot was able to regain power and return to the airport for a normal landing. Post landing inspection of the aircraft revealed an exhaust pipe had cracked and caused the lower engine cowling to catch fire just forward of the engine air intake. The exhaust had cracked where a previous repair had been made due to a previous crack. The repair was improper due to the weld not fully penetrating the cracked metal. Probable cause(s): Cracked exhaust system, manifold/pipe. Contributing Factors: Improper maintenance.
- January 17, 1989 KFMY, Piper PA-32-300, N4763T, Injuries: 1 Minor. The pilot stated that during the initial climb after takeoff, he heard a 'pop' & the engine started running rough. He turned back toward the airport. About 2 min later, there was a loud noise, which was followed by a progressive loss of all power. Subsequently, the aircraft was damaged during an emergency landing at night in a marshy area about 1 to 2 mi from the airport. An exam of the engine revealed the #5 connecting rod cap bolt had failed, which resulted in further damage of the engine. Probable cause: Failure of the #5 connecting rod bolt. Factors related to the accident were: Dark night and the soft and wet (marshy) terrain conditions in the emergency landing area.
- February 26, 1990 KSRQ, Cessna 210, N525CW, Injuries: 1 Serious: The commercial pilot was on initial climb at 200 feet AGL from the Sarasota-Bradenton airport, Sarasota, FL, when the airplane experienced a total loss of engine power. The pilot was on a non scheduled air taxi flight in VFR conditions. No flight plan was filed. The pilot conducted an emergency descent, and forced landing back to the departure airport. On landing roll, the airplane experienced an on ground collision with a dirt bank and was destroyed. The pilot sustained serious injuries. Examination of the crankshaft by the NTSB materials laboratory revealed the crankshaft failed due to fatigue cracking of undetermined origin. Probable cause(s): The total loss of engine power caused by crankshaft failure, due to fatigue cracking of undetermined origin.
- January 28, 1991 KORL, Cessna 210L, N210GC, Injuries: 1 Fatal: The pilot reported a vacuum pump failure to his company operations and air traffic control by airplane radio. While being vectored for an ILS back-course approach in instrument conditions, the airplane collided with terrain. Probable cause(s): The pilot's failure to maintain aircraft control in instrument conditions and his spatial disorientation. Factors were a failure of the vacuum pump and the pilot's lack of recent experience in partial panel instrument flying or training.
- September 21, 1992 KORL, Cessna 210L, N2013S, Injuries: 1 Uninjured: Pilot stated that while attempting to extend the landing gear the gear hydraulic motor operated but the gear did not extend. After several seconds of gear motor operation the circuit breaker for the gear motor popped. Further attempts to extend the gear by normal and emergency procedures were unsuccessful. A gear up landing was made. After the accident the aircraft was raised and the landing gear was extended by use of the manual gear extension emergency hydraulic pump. According to maintenance personnel a wire to the nose landing gear squat switch was chafed and grounded which caused the system to be signaled for gear up at all times. They further stated the pilot could not extend the gear by use of the backup hydraulic pump because the gear down solenoid had overheated during attempts to lower the gear and froze in the gear up position. After the solenoid cooled after landing they were able to manually lower the gear. Probable cause(s): Undetected chafing and grounding of a wire to the nose landing gear squat switch which resulted in the landing gear being signaled at all times for gear up when electrical power was applied to the system. Contributing to the accident was the overheating of the gear down solenoid which caused it to stick in the gear up position and prevented the gear from being manually extended.
- September 21, 1992, KORL, Cessna 210L, N777BK, Injuries: 1 Uninjured: Flight was unable to get safe indication for landing gear extended while approaching destination airport. Flight returned to departure airport. After accomplishing emergency procedures for gear extension, gear safe indication was still not obtained. Pilot determined all hydraulic fluid had been lost. Flight was landed with the nose gear locked and the main gears partially extended. Post-landing examination revealed right main gear hydraulic actuator had failed due to overstress along metal grain boundaries and at area of low wall thickness. All hydraulic system pressures were found to be normal and no other landing gear system failures were found. After failure of the gear actuator all normal and emergency system fluid was lost through the actuator. Probable cause(s): Failure of the right main landing gear actuator due to overstress for undetermined reasons which resulted in loss of all landing gear system hydraulic fluid which in turn resulted in the pilot being unable to extend and lock the landing gear.
- October 27, 1994 Jacksonville, FL, Cessna 210L, N732CQ, Injuries: 1 Uninjured: The pilot was on approach at the destination airport and lowered the landing gear. The right main landing gear did not illuminate. The pilot completed the emergency procedure from memory and visually checked the landing gear. The landing gear appeared to be extended. The pilot landed without further incident and taxied to the ramp. Visual inspection of the landing gear revealed the right main landing gear was not in the lock position. The pilot called maintenance personnel on the phone and was informed to reposition the airplane to another airport with the landing gear down to get a replacement airplane. The pilot flew the airplane to the maintenance base. On landing rollout, the right main landing gear collapsed. Examination of the landing gear by the FAA revealed improper rigging of the right main landing gear down lock mechanism due to normal wear. The probable cause was the pilot's decision to depart an airport and continue flight with known deficient equipment. Contributing to the accident was the failure of company maintenance personnel to adjust the down lock mechanism prior to flight.
- August 21, 1996, KOPF, Cessna 210M, N732ST, injuries: 1 uninjured: – The pilot stated he was in cruise flight at 3,000 feet, when the engine quit. He said that he moved the fuel selector from the left main tank to the right main tank and attempted two engine restarts, which were unsuccessful. A forced landing was made in the Everglades. Visual examination of the left fuel tank revealed no fuel and the fuel cap was tight. Fuel was present in the right fuel tank and the fuel cap was tight. The wings were not damaged and no fuel leaks were observed. Review of aircraft log books revealed no discrepancies relating to fuel quantity indications or fuel flow discrepancies. The airplane was recovered and the wings were reinstalled to provide a pressurized system for an engine test run. The engine started and was operated for 17 minutes. Probable cause(s): The pilot's improper fuel management, which resulted in a loss of engine power due to fuel starvation, a forced landing, and subsequent in flight collision with terrain. The lack of suitable terrain for a forced landing was a related factor.
- December 4, 2002, a single-engine Cessna 210L airplane, N210CT, operating as Flight Express 714 (FLX714), was destroyed following an in-flight breakup during initial climb after takeoff from runway 36 at Boone County Airport (HRO), near Harrison, Arkansas. The pilot, who was the sole occupant of the airplane, was fatally injured. The pilot's failure to maintain control of the aircraft and the exceedance of the weight limits resulted in an in-flight break-up.
- December 4, 2002, at 17:32 local, a Cessna 210M, N7660E, operated by Flight Express as flight 905, was substantially damaged during a gear-up landing at Cincinnati Lunken Field (LUK). The pilot was not injured. The airplane sustained substantial damage to the horizontal stabilizer, right elevator, and empennage. The cause of the landing gear failure was the rupture of a hydraulic line due to repeated contact with the aileron cable.
- December 31, 2004, a single-engine Cessna 210N, N6195N, operating as Flight Express 106 (FLX106), crashed into the Florida Everglades, west of Fort Lauderdale, Florida. The pilot, who was the sole occupant of the airplane, was fatally injured. The pilot's failure to maintain his assigned altitude allowed the airplane to descend for undetermined reasons resulting in an in-flight collision with terrain
- February 27, 2008, at about 01:41 local, a Cessna 210L, N5489V, operated as FLX 805, experienced collapse of the right main landing gear during landing at TPA. The airplane was substantially damaged and the pilot was not injured. The flight originated from CAE about 2243. The NTSB determined the probable cause of this accident to be the malfunction of the right main landing gear down-and-locked switch.
- June 8, 2010, N2263S, a Cessna 210L, departed TPA for FXE. Shortly after takeoff the engine lost power. The pilot turned back toward the airport and the engine lost total power. At 20:39 local, the aircraft landed off airport and struck a fence which resulted in substantial damage to the fuselage and left wing. The pilot was uninjured. The NTSB determined the probable cause of this accident to be the total loss of engine power due to inadequate torque on crankcase bolts and crankshaft failure.
- October 12, 2011, a single-engine Cessna 210M, N7660E, operating as Flight Express 720 (FLX720), crash-landed at the Wheeler Downtown Airport. The plane was en route from Kansas City, Missouri, to Dodge City, when its gear failed to deploy. The pilot returned to Kansas City because the Dodge City Airport wasn't able to handle the emergency landing. The aircraft landed gear-up and the pilot was unscathed in the incident. Airport fire crews doused fire retardant on the aircraft upon landing.
- November 28, 2013, at about 02:51 EST, Cessna N777BK was substantially damaged during a forced landing on a road near Montrose, Pennsylvania. The commercial pilot sustained minor injury and the airplane was substantially damaged. The airplane was registered to Flight Express, Inc., and operated by Airnet Systems, Inc., as flight USC146, under FAR 135. Marginal VFR conditions prevailed in the area. The flight was operating VFR flight following. The flight originated from Teterboro Airport around 01:36, and was destined for Buffalo Niagara International Airport. The pilot stated that the fuel tanks were filled before departure but he did not check the fuel tanks for contaminants after fueling. The flight departed with the fuel selector positioned to the right tank and climbed to 8,500 feet. About 15 minutes after established in cruise, the pilot switched to the left tank. About 15 to 20 minutes later he heard a sound and noticed the cylinder head temperature and exhaust gas temperatures had dropped to their lowest point on the scale and the fuel flow increased between 140 pounds-per-hour and the maximum the needle could go. He adjusted the mixture to no effect. The fuel selector was returned to the right tank, the mixture was enriched, and the fuel pump turned on to low, and then high, positions for about 5 seconds each. Unable to maintain altitude, he set a course for an airport 25 to 30 miles north of his position but realized he would be unable to land there. He maneuvered the airplane for a forced landing on a road but again realized that he would be unable to reach that road. He descended through clouds between 6,000 and 4,500 feet. After descending below the clouds, the aircraft was maneuvered for a landing on the road. The airplane collided with an unmarked power line that crossed the road diagonally. The airplane came to rest upright. According to contract maintenance personnel who recovered the airplane, while attempting to drain the left fuel tank from the sump drain, blockage of the opening by ice was noted.
- December 19, 2013, at approximately 23:51 EST, a single-engine Cessna 210N, N5307A, operated by Flight Express, experienced a loss of engine power and crashed near the northwest corner of the Tampa International Airport (KTPA). The cause of the crash was determined to be engine failure when the No. 4 connecting rod failed and breached the engine crankcase. The commercial pilot was seriously injured. VFR, night time conditions prevailed and the airplane was operating on an IFR flight plan. The flight had originated from Valdosta Regional Airport (VLD), about 23:07.
