= Thrust Flight =

American flight school

Thrust Flight, founded as a partner of US Sport Aircraft in 2006, is a flight school with its main campus at the Addison Airport near Dallas, two satellite locations in Texas (North Texas Regional Airport and Conroe-North Houston Regional Airport), and one location in Arizona (at Falcon Field airport. The aviation training school features a program that aims to get students working with commercial carriers in only two years.

== History ==
Thrust Flight was born out of a Florida-based aircraft importer called US Sport Aircraft, which between 2006 and 2017 purchased CZAW SportCruiser aircraft for use by its affiliated "partner" flight school, which became Thrust Flight. Current Thrust Flight CEO, Patrick Arnzen (who is also a certified aircraft mechanic and former airline pilot), acquired a part of the flight school business around 2010, and he entirely took over the company by 2012. Both Arnzen's father and grandfather were recreational pilots.

In 2022, Thrust Flight received Federal Aviation Administration (FAA) approval for an accelerated commercial course where students can obtain a job as a commercial pilot or instructor in as little as 7 months, or as a regional airline pilot in as little as 20 months.

In 2024, the company was acquired by investment capital firm Summit Park, of Charlotte, North Carolina.

The school maintains career path partnerships with several large airlines including Air Wisconsin, Avelo, Envoy Air, Republic Airways, SkyWest and Spirit. The school is certified under FAA Part 141 and Part 61. The FAA can authorize a flight school to have "examining authority," which allows the school to issue pilot certificates after students complete their training and pass an internal evaluation, bypassing the traditional need for a separate FAA inspector or Designated Pilot Examiner (DPE), and Thrust Flight is one of the 15% of U.S. flight schools with examining authority designation from the FAA.

In July 2025, the company launched a mechanics' school at the Conroe facility, and it established FAA-approved aircraft dispatcher courses in both Addison and North Texas (Denison).

== Aircraft ==
Thrust Flight trains students using a Redbird FMX Full Motion flight simulator, as well as Piper PA-28 Cherokee (Archer TX), Piper PA-44 Seminole, and Game Composites GB1 GameBird aircraft.
