= Addison Airport =

Public airport in Dallas County, Texas, US

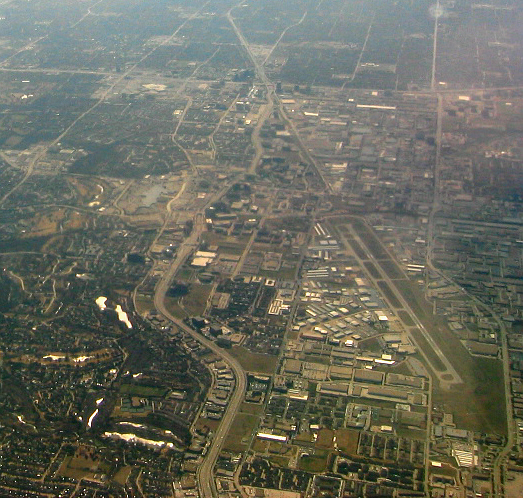
- IATA: ADS; ICAO: KADS; FAA LID: ADS

Summary
- Airport type: Public
- Owner: City of Addison
- Serves: Dallas–Fort Worth metroplex
- Location: Addison, Texas, U.S.
- Operating base for: Ameristar Air Cargo; Ameristar Jet Charter; Flight Express; GTA Air; Martinaire
- Elevation AMSL: 645 ft (197 m)
- Coordinates: 32°58′07″N 096°50′11″W
- Website: www.addisonairport.net

Map
- Location ADS (the United States)

Runways
Direction	Length		Surface
Direction	ft	m	Surface
16/34	7,203	2,195	Concrete

Statistics (2023)
- Aircraft operations (year ending 9/30/2023): 119,065
- Based aircraft: 576
- Source: Federal Aviation Administration effective January 25, 2024

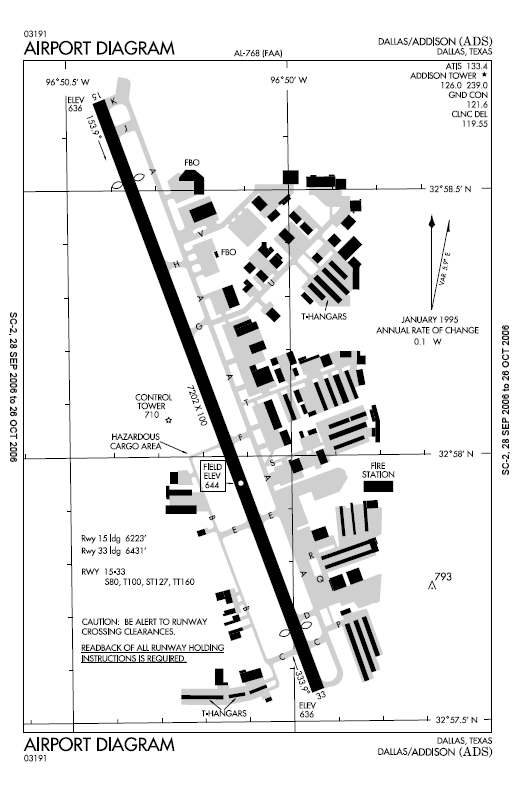
FAA airport diagram

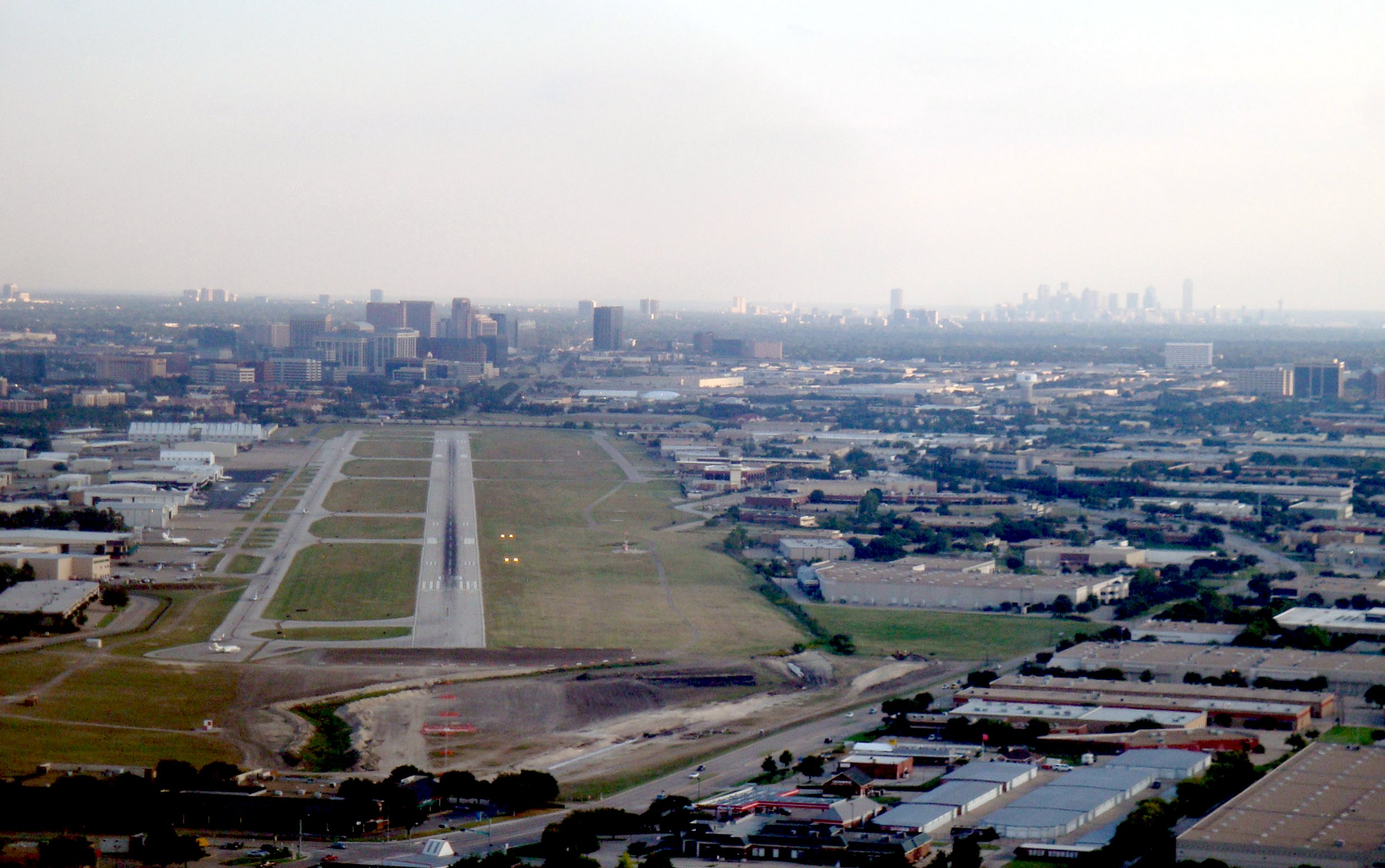
Runway 15 with Dallas in the background

Addison Airport (IATA: ADS, ICAO: KADS, FAA LID: ADS) is a public airport in Addison, in Dallas County, Texas, United States, 9 mi (7.8 nmi; 14 km) north of downtown Dallas. It opened in 1954 and was purchased by the town of Addison in 1976.

The Addison Airport Toll Tunnel, completed in 1999, allows east–west automobile traffic to cross the airport under the runway.

== History ==
The town of Addison originally formed in 1904 as a small unincorporated community surrounding a St. Louis Southwestern Railway depot located at the northern end of a branch line to Dallas. On June 15, 1953, residents voted to incorporate because they did not want the nearby cities of Dallas, Carrollton, or Farmers Branch to annex the community. By the mid 1950s, the newly incorporated city had about five hundred residents, but few public improvements and no local water system.

In 1955, Guy Dennis, the son-in-law of founding settler Sidney Smith Noell, sold his large farm north of the depot to W.T. Overton, a 28-year-old businessman from Dallas, who announced in January 1956 that he would build Addison Airport on the site. Overton said that it would be the first airfield in the area designed for business jets, then a novel innovation. Overton and his partners chose the airport site because Civil Aeronautics Administration statistics indicated that more aircraft owners lived in Texas than in any state other than California, and the largest cluster of those owners resided in Dallas County; additionally, most upscale residential development likely to attract aircraft owners was being built in the northern part of the county.

The partners incorporated Addison Airport, Inc. (AAI) on August 30, 1956, and laid out an industrial park in the triangular area formed by the main railway line, Dooley Road, and the main runway. After obtaining final approval from the city, the airport had its formal groundbreaking ceremony on March 16, 1957. The airfield included a 5,000 sq ft (460 m^{2}) terminal building, and its primary paved runway, 15/33, was 4,500 ft (1,400 m) long–deliberately 50 ft (15 m) longer than the longest runway at the newly constructed Redbird Airport in South Dallas.

AAI needed a professional manager for the airport. Overton's partner James DeLoache was impressed by Henry Stuart, who managed nearby Park Cities Airport, and quickly persuaded Stuart to leave that airport and manage Addison Airport instead. AAI realized that a private well would not support their development plans, so they petitioned the city to drill a municipal well and build its first public water system. The project was approved by voters in April 1957 and construction began in August. The well was later supplemented by a large water main extended from Dallas.

The airport's grand opening was held on October 18, 1957.

== Facilities and aircraft ==
Addison Airport covers 368 acres (149 ha); its one runway, 16/34, is 7,203-by-100-foot (2,195 m × 30 m) concrete. In the year ending September 30, 2023, it had 119,065 aircraft operations, averaging 326 per day: 68% general aviation, 32% air taxi, <1% airline and <1% military. 576 aircraft were then based at the airport: 326 single-engine, 86 multi-engine, 157 jet and 7 helicopter. In 2022, its runway designation was changed from 15/33 to 16/34.

There are currently three fixed-base operators: Atlantic Aviation, Galaxy FBO, and Million Air.

Charter services are available from a variety of companies, with Business Jet Solutions and Bombardier FlexJet having large operations.

The airport is the headquarters of Ameristar Jet Charter, GTA Air, and Martinaire, and also has scheduled freight flights from AirNet Express, Flight Express, and Flight Development.

It is also a training hub, with primary to advanced flight instruction available from Thrust Flight, American Flyers, Stature Aviation, CTL Aero, Epic Flight Academy, and PlaneSmart!.

== Airlines and destinations ==
=== Cargo ===
Airlines	Destinations
GTA Air	Austin, El Paso, Lubbock (TX)
Martinaire	Abilene, Dallas/Fort Worth, Houston-Intercontinental

== Accidents and incidents ==
- July 19, 1986: All four occupants of a Cessna 421, aircraft registration N6VR, were killed when the aircraft suffered an apparent right-hand engine failure, rolled over, and dived into a vacant lot immediately after takeoff from Addison Airport. The post-crash investigation revealed that the right-hand engine did not show any obvious signs of failure and its controls were not set to deliver full takeoff power. The crash was attributed to incorrect engine control operation; the pilot had recently purchased the Cessna 421 but had not been formally trained to fly it, and most of his twin-engined experience had been in an airplane with engine controls that operated in the reverse direction of those in the Cessna.
- June 20, 1992: The pilot of a Piper J3C-65 Cub, registered N3128M, reported trouble and attempted to return to Addison Airport soon after taking off to test a newly installed engine. While turning to line up with the runway, the airplane suddenly lost altitude, rolled upside down, and crashed in the middle of nearby Beltway Drive, killing the pilot and his passenger. The crash was attributed to breakage of the left-hand elevator control tube due to corrosion.
- January 1, 2004: The pilot and passenger of a Bellanca 17-30A Super Viking, registered N4104B, died when the aircraft struck houses in the Preston Hollow neighborhood of nearby Dallas, Texas, after departing from Addison Airport bound for Amarillo, Texas. An intense post-crash fire destroyed two houses and the remains of the Bellanca, but an elderly resident of one house escaped injury after being dragged out of the burning structure by his caregiver, who was also unhurt. The crash was attributed to spatial disorientation in densely clouded IFR conditions; the pilot had reported a partial instrument panel failure, after which radar data indicated that he was making left turns instead of right turns as directed by air traffic controllers.
- October 24, 2011: A Cirrus SR22, registered N227TX, attempted to return to Addison Airport shortly after takeoff. After several missed approaches, the aircraft crashed on a railroad track next to Hebron High School, killing one passenger and seriously injuring the pilot and a second passenger. The accident was attributed to "the pilot's failure to adequately preflight the airplane prior to departure, which resulted in a loss of engine power due to fuel exhaustion."

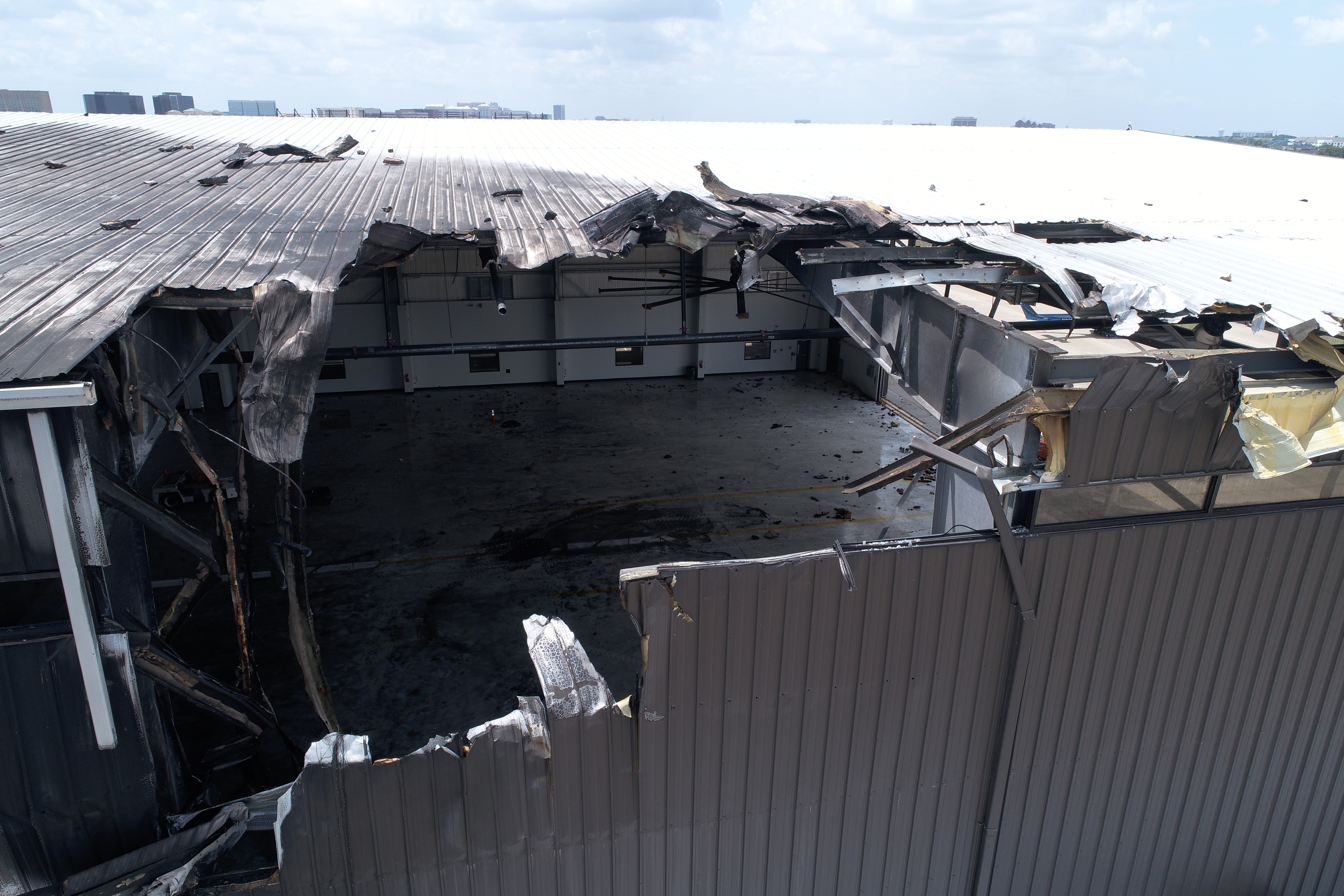
Hangar damage from June 2019 King Air accident

- June 30, 2019: A Beechcraft King Air 350i, registered N534FF, crashed into a hangar on airport grounds after taking off for a flight to St. Petersburg, Florida, killing all eight passengers and two pilots on board. The hangar was unoccupied at the time of the crash and nobody on the ground was harmed. The aircraft reportedly dropped its left wing on takeoff and immediately veered to the left. The Federal Aviation Administration (FAA) and the National Transportation Safety Board investigated. The investigation determined an engine failure was followed by the pilot moving the rudder the wrong way, causing the aircraft to roll over and crash.

== Motor racing ==
Addison Airport circuit
- Location: Dallas, TX, US
- Opened: 1989
- Closed: 1991
- Major events: Trans-Am Series (1989-1991); SCCA Corvette Challenge (1989); SCCA Formula Super Vee (1989-1991); SCCA RaceTruck Challenge (1989-1991)
- Website: http://www.addisonairport.net/

Circuit (1989–1991)
- Length: 2.53 km (1.57 mi)
- Race lap record: 1:12.087 ( (United States) Irv Hoerr, Oldsmobile Cutlass Supreme, 1990, Trans-Am)

In 1989, 1990, and 1991, Addison Airport hosted the Dallas Grand Prix, consisting of Trans-Am Series, SCCA Formula Super Vee, SCCA Corvette Challenge, and SCCA RaceTruck Challenge races. The Dallas Grand Prix previously took place on a street circuit in Fair Park, but complaints from nearby homeowners prompted organizers to seek a less noise-sensitive venue, and they decided on Addison Airport because the surrounding area was largely industrial in nature. The 1989 event was held on May 12–14 on a temporary 1.57 mi (2.53 km) circuit that traversed public streets, taxiways, and the south end of the runway. The races benefited Addison hotels and restaurants, but setup and teardown of the circuit and grandstands disrupted airfield operations for weeks, prompting airport businesses and the airport management company to lodge complaints with the town and the FAA in 1990. After the 1991 event, the FAA, the town, the race organizers, and airport managers and tenants agreed that 1992 would be the last year the event would be held at the airport. The agreement became moot when the race organizers, who had lost money on the previous events, cancelled the 1992 event citing financial reasons.

== See also ==
- List of airports in Texas
