= Ameristar Jet Charter =

Airline of the United States

Ameristar Air Cargo, Inc.
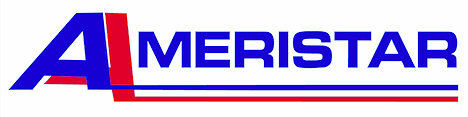
IATA	ICAO	Call sign
7Z	AJI	AMERISTAR
- Founded: 2000; 26 years ago
- AOC #: MJYA749T
- Operating bases: Addison Airport and Willow Run Airport
- Fleet size: 13
- Headquarters: Dallas, Texas, United States
- Key people: Tom Wachendorfer
- Website: http://www.ameristarjet.com/

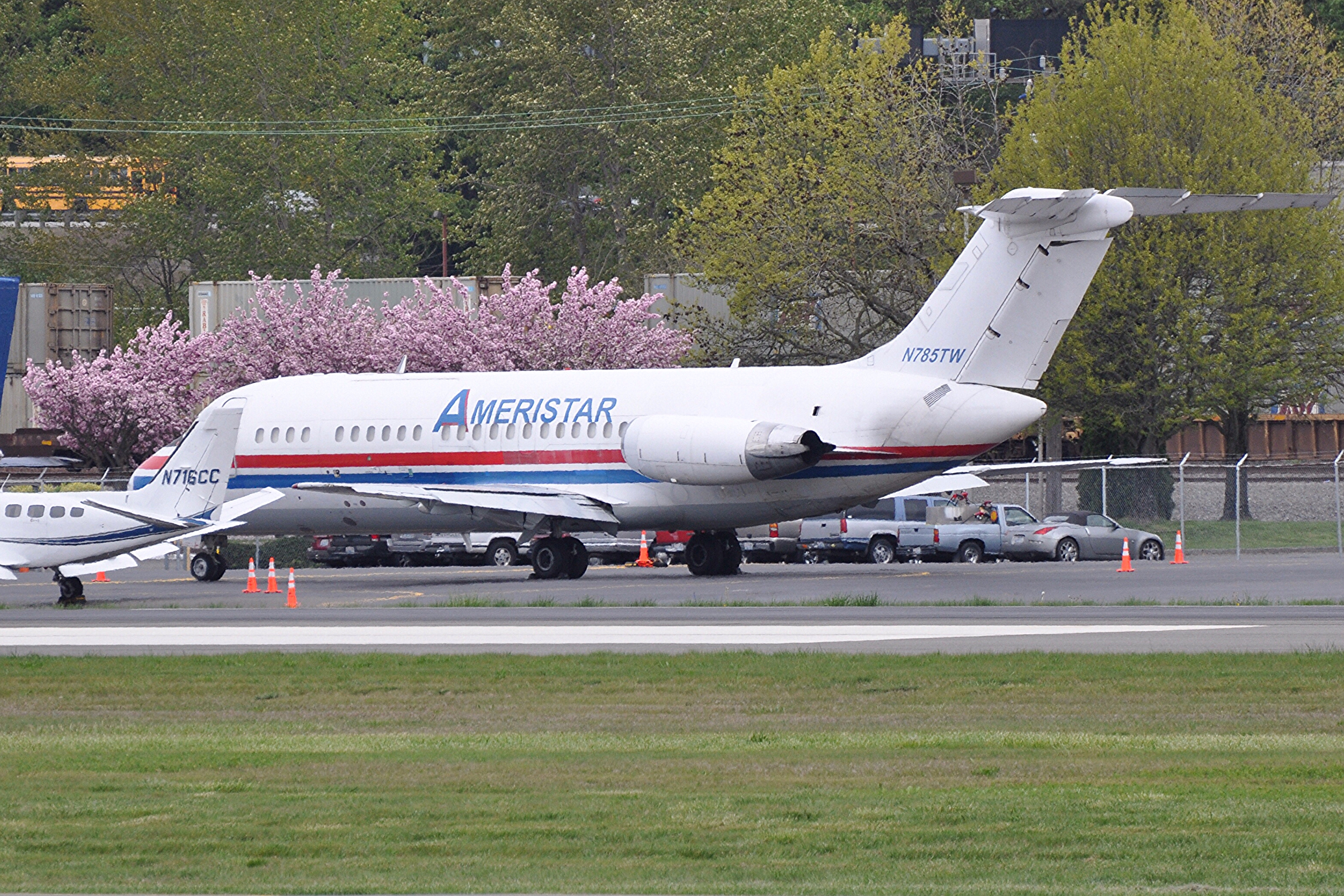
Douglas DC 9-15

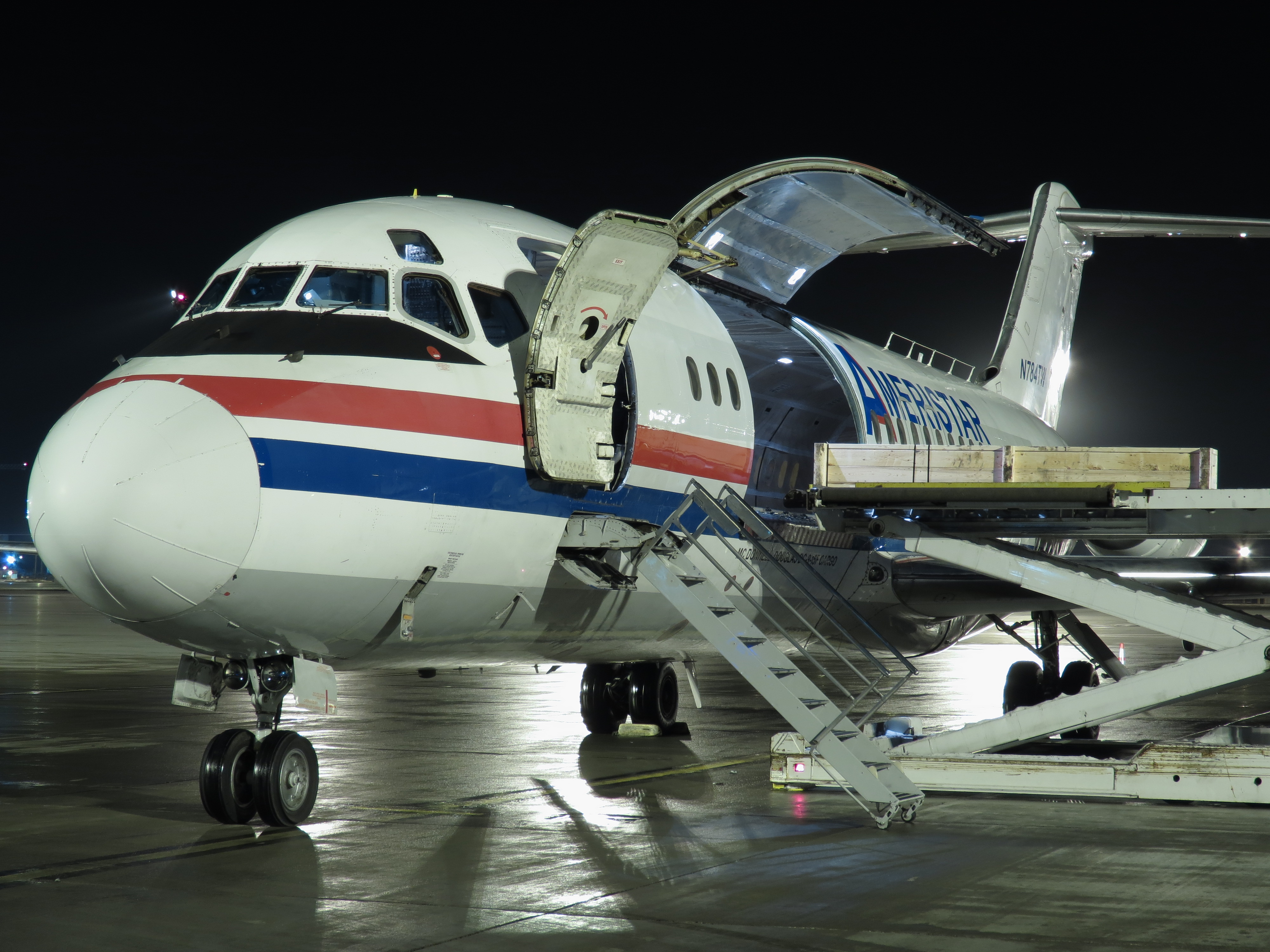
Douglas DC 9-15F

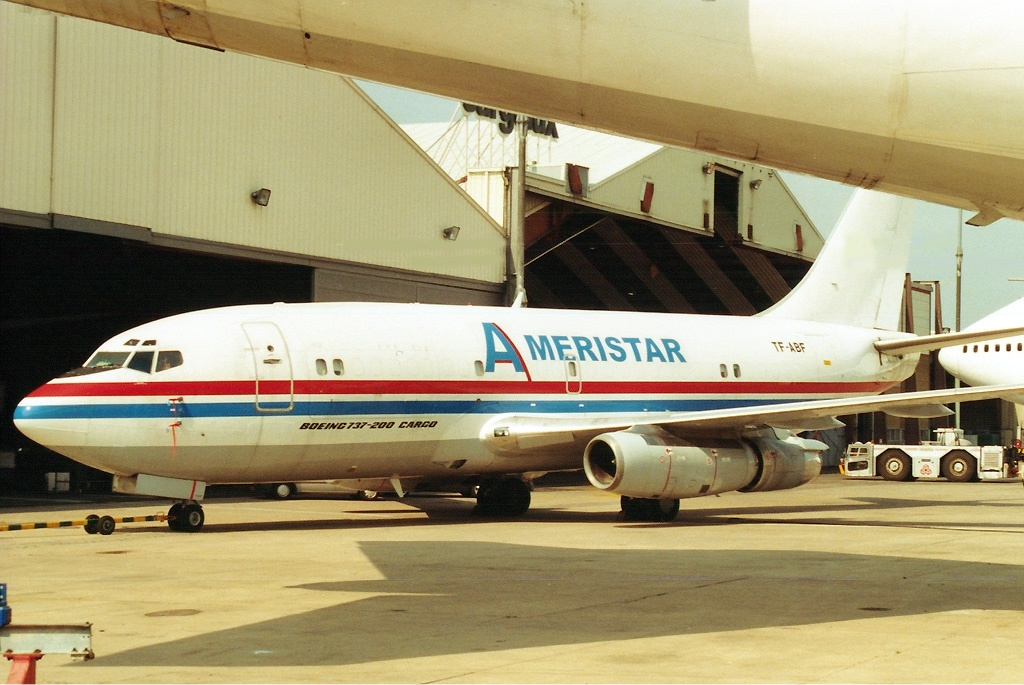
Boeing 737-200

Ameristar Air Cargo, Inc. is an American passenger and cargo airline based in Dallas, Texas, United States. It operates passenger and cargo services in the Americas and acts as a broker to other cargo carriers. Its main base is Addison Airport in north Dallas, with hubs at Willow Run Airport and El Paso International Airport.

== History ==
The airline started operations on 4 September 2000. It is wholly owned by Tom Wachendorfer (the airline’s president). Passenger operations began with Boeing 737-200 in September 2005. Passengers include sports and entertainment industry celebrities, college athletic teams, and high-wealth individuals.

In 2008, an Ameristar 737-200 was painted for use in the film The Kingdom as a T-43.

== Fleet ==
The Ameristar Charters fleet comprises the following aircraft (as of February 2022):

Ameristar Charters fleet
Aircraft	In fleet	Orders	Passengers	Notes
Boeing 737-200	2	—	F56	(as of August 2025)
Douglas DC-9-15RC	4	—	Cargo	(as of August 2025)
Dassault Falcon 20F	7	—	Cargo	
Total	13			

The Ameristar Air Cargo fleet previously included the following aircraft:

- 2 Boeing 737-200C
- 3 Falcon 20F

Previously operated by Ameristar Jet Charters:

- 1 McDonnell Douglas MD-83
- 2 Boeing 737-200
- 1 Beechcraft 90
- 5 Learjet 25
- 10 Learjet 24

== Accidents and incidents ==
On August 24, 2001, an Ameristar Jet Charter Learjet 24, registration number N153TW, crashed after takeoff from Ithaca Tompkins Regional Airport destined for Jackson-Reynolds Municipal Airport, killing both pilots. The probable cause of the accident was spatial disorientation due to low visibility night-time flight conditions.

On September 29, 2003, an Ameristar Jet Charter Learjet 24, performing Flight 982 from El Paso International Airport to Del Rio International Airport overran the runway on landing. The probable cause of the accident was a higher than recommended landing speed. The plane plunged into flames after exhausting the length of the runway, killing one of two crew members.

On January 9, 2007, an Ameristar Jet Charter Learjet 24, performing Flight 878 from Laredo International Airport to Miguel Hidalgo y Costilla Guadalajara International Airport impacted terrain while on descent towards its destination, killing both pilots on board.

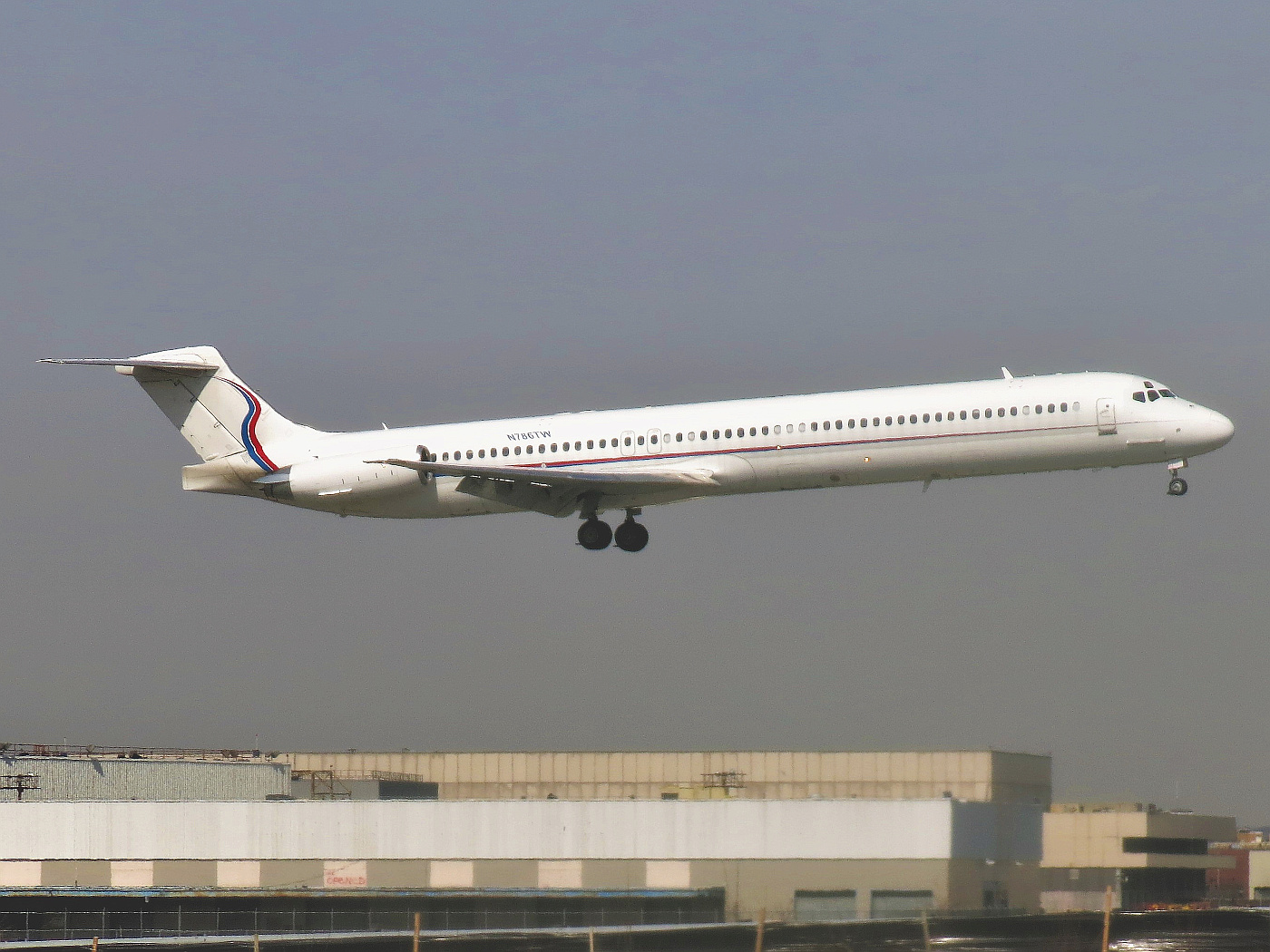
The aircraft was substantially damaged in a runway overrun incident at Willow Run Airport.

On March 8, 2017, an Ameristar Jet Charter McDonnell Douglas MD-83 performing Flight 9363 from Willow Run Airport to Washington Dulles International Airport and carrying the University of Michigan basketball band, spirit staff, and team to the Big Ten Tournament overran the runway at Willow Run in Ypsilanti after aborting takeoff in high wind and above V_{1} speed. During the takeoff roll, a fault with the elevator system prevented normal takeoff rotation, forcing the takeoff to be rejected at high speed once it became clear that the aircraft could not fly. The aircraft ultimately came to a rest just past a perimeter road with the fuselage intact but with the undercarriage significantly damaged and the nose gear broken off. There was one minor injury sustained.
