= McDonnell Douglas MD-80 =

Jet airliner model, series based on the DC-9

MD-80 series
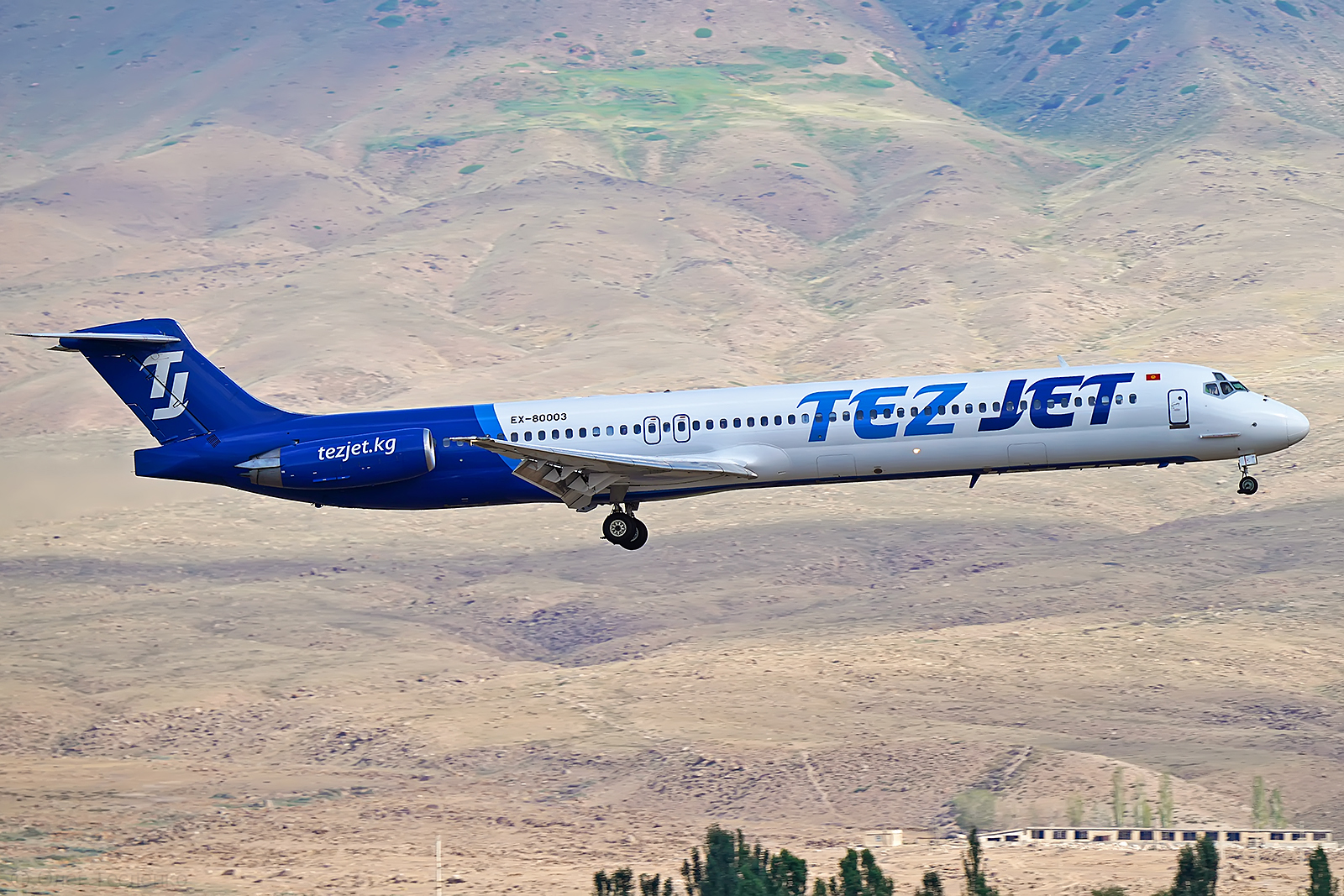
- MD-83 operated by TezJet landing at Issyk-Kul

General information
- Type: Narrow-body jet airliner
- National origin: United States
- Manufacturer: McDonnell Douglas (1979–1997); Boeing Commercial Airplanes (1997–1999); Shanghai Aircraft Manufacturing Company (under license)
- Status: In limited service
- Primary users: Aeronaves TSM ATA Airlines; LASER Airlines; Everts Air
- Number built: 1,191

History
- Manufactured: 1979–1999
- Introduction date: October 10, 1980, with Swissair
- First flight: October 18, 1979
- Developed from: McDonnell Douglas DC-9
- Developed into: McDonnell Douglas MD-90

The McDonnell Douglas MD-80 is a series of five-abreast single-aisle airliners developed by McDonnell Douglas. It was produced by the developer company until August 1997 and then by Boeing Commercial Airplanes. The MD-80 was the second generation of the DC-9 family, originally designated as the DC-9-80 (DC-9 Series 80) and later stylized as the DC-9 Super 80 (Super 80 for short). With a stretched, enlarged wing and powered by higher bypass Pratt & Whitney JT8D-200 engines, the aircraft program was launched in October 1977. The MD-80 made its first flight on October 18, 1979, and was certified on August 25, 1980. The first airliner was delivered to launch customer Swissair on September 13, 1980, which introduced it into service on October 10, 1980.

Keeping the same fuselage cross-section, longer variants are stretched by up to 14 ft (4.3 m) from the DC-9-50 and have a 28% larger wing.

The larger variants (MD-81/82/83/88) are 148 ft (45.1 m) long to seat 155 passengers in coach and, with varying weights, can cover up to 2,550 nautical miles [nmi] (4,720 km; 2,930 mi). The later MD-88 has a modern cockpit with electronic flight instrument system (EFIS) displays. The MD-87 is 17 ft (5.3 m) shorter for 130 passengers in economy and has a range up to 2,900 nmi (5,400 km; 3,300 mi).

The MD-80 series initially competed with the Boeing 737 Classic and then also with the Airbus A320ceo family. Its successor, introduced in 1995, the MD-90, was a further stretch powered by IAE V2500 high-bypass turbofans, while the shorter MD-95, later known as the Boeing 717, was powered by Rolls-Royce BR715 engines. Production ended in 1999 after 1,191 MD-80s were delivered, of which 116 aircraft remain in service as of August 2022.

== Development ==
The DC-9 series, the first generation of the DC-9 family, entered service in late 1965 and became a commercial success with 976 units built when production ended in 1982. The all-new designed aircraft family includes five members or variants (DC-9-10 / DC-9 Series 10, Series 20, Series 30, Series 40, and Series 50) with ten sub-variants or versions (Series 11, Series 12, Series 14, Series 15, Series 21, Series 31, Series 32, Series 33, Series 34, Series 41, and Series 51) and features two rear fuselage-mounted turbofan engines, a T-tail configuration, a narrow-body fuselage with five-abreast seating for 80 to 135 passengers. The success prompted the manufacturer to further develop the aircraft family with the last member, Series 50, as the reference aircraft.

=== Feasibility study ===
In the 1970s, McDonnell Douglas began development of the first derivative or second generation of the DC-9 family, a lengthened version of the Series 50, with a higher maximum take-off weight (MTOW), larger wing, new main landing gear, and higher fuel capacity. Availability of newer versions of the Pratt & Whitney JT8D turbofan engine with higher bypass ratios and thrust ratings drove early studies including designs known as Series 55, Series 50 (refanned Super Stretch), and Series 60. In August 1977, the design effort focused on the Series 55.

=== Program launch ===
With entry into service projected in 1980, the improved aircraft design was initially designated as the Series 80, which would be the sixth variant of the first generation. In October 1977 Swissair became the launch customer for the Series 80 with an order for 15 plus an option for 5. The launch of the next aircraft models followed in October 1977 for the Series 81 (MD-81), on April 16, 1979, for the Series 82 (MD-82), on January 31, 1983, for the Series 83 ( MD-83). In January 1985 came the introduction of the Series 87 (MD-87), and on January 23, 1986, the Series 88 (MD-88).

=== Certification ===
==== Type designation ====
Similar to the first generation of the DC-9 family, the second generation uses second-digit notation, with zero for variant names (Series 80) and non-zero for subvariant or version names (Series 81 through Series 88). Because there was only one variant within the second generation, the Series 80 became the family name and the Series 81 through Series 88 became variant or version names. The first Series 80, DC-9 line number 909, made its first flight on October 18, 1979, as the Super 80, which then became the preferred designation for the newly developed aircraft family. (Note: Some sources said that the Super 80 designation (shorted, without DC-9 prefix) was intended to avoid association with the DC-10's bad reputation at the time.) Although two aircraft were substantially damaged in accidents, flight testing was completed on August 25, 1980, when the first variant and production model, the JT8D-209-powered Series 81, was certified under an amendment to the FAA type certificate for the DC-9. The flight-testing leading up to certification had involved three aircraft accumulating a total of 1,085 flying hours on 795 flights. After production of the first generation ended in late 1982, a new designation with McDonnell Douglas initials, MD-80, was proposed as the type designation for the second generation and in July 1983, McDonnell Douglas decided that the Super 80 would be officially designated the MD-80. However, the type designation according to the type certificate (TC) is still the original (DC-9 prefix) to save on certification costs, but could also be provided with the new (MD prefix) written in parentheses, e.g. DC-9-81 (MD-81), DC-9-82 (MD-82), DC-9-83 (MD-83) and DC-9-87 (MD-87). Only the last variant, the MD-88, was officially certified under the MD designation.

==== Type certification (TC) ====
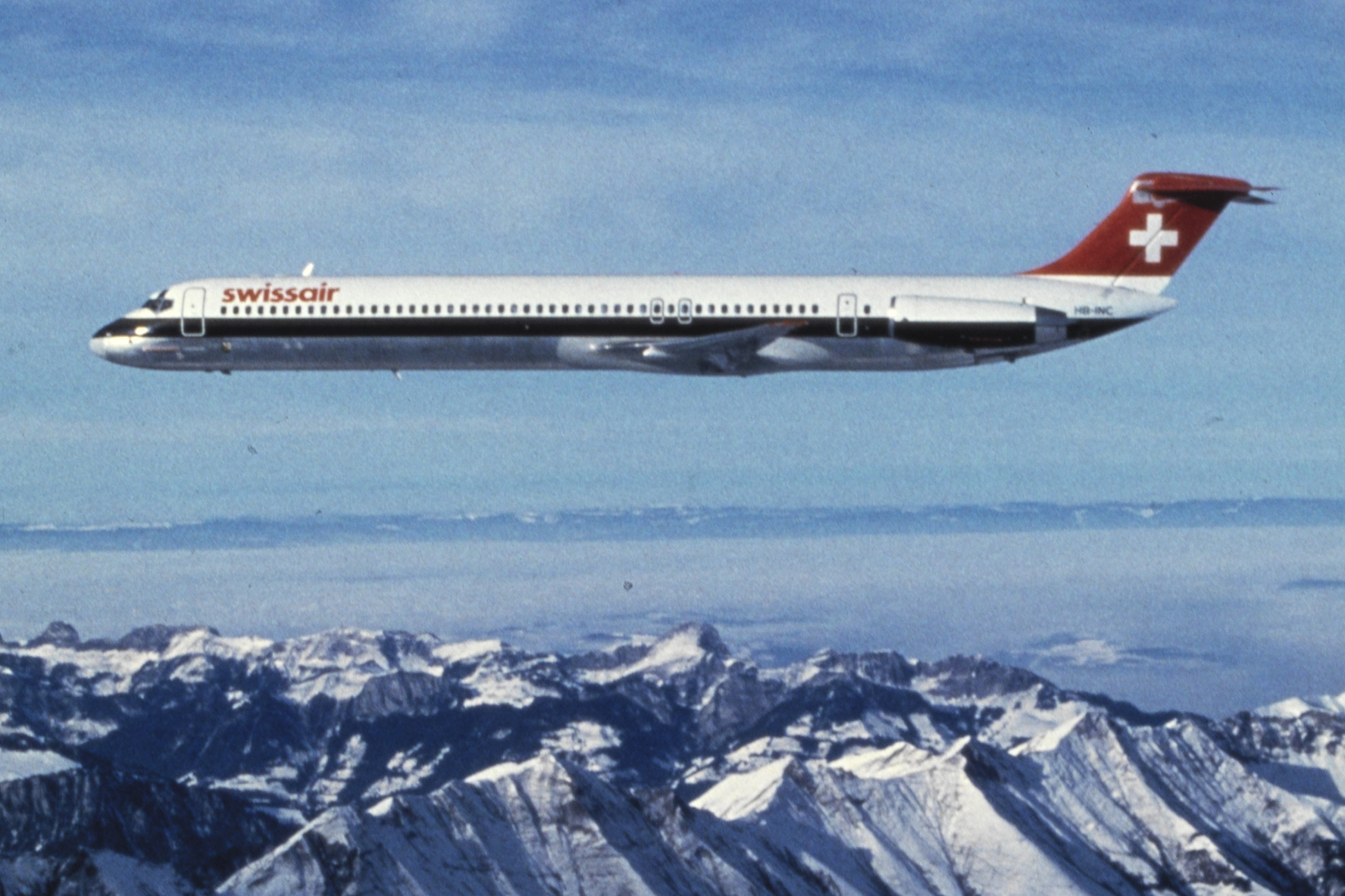
An MD-81 of the type's launch operator, Swissair. It was certified by the FAA in August 1980.

Following the MD-81's first flight on October 18, 1979, the MD-82 and MD-83 made their maiden flights on January 8, 1981, and December 17, 1984, respectively. They were then certified by the FAA on August 25, 1980, July 29, 1981, and October 17, 1985, respectively. The first airliner, an MD-81, was delivered to launch operator Swissair on September 13, 1980. Instead of merely using the MD- prefix as a marketing symbol, an application was made to again amend the type certificate to include the MD-81, MD-82, and MD-83. This change was dated March 10, 1986, and the type certificate declared that although the MD designator could be used in parentheses, it must be accompanied by the official designation, for example: DC-9-81 (MD-81). All Long Beach aircraft in the MD-80 series thereafter had MD-81, MD-82, or MD-83 stamped on the aircraft nameplate. (Note: As the MD-80 was not in effect a new aircraft, it continues to be operated under an amendment to the original DC-9 FAA aircraft type certificate (a similar case to the later MD-90 and Boeing 717 aircraft). The type certificate issued to the aircraft manufacturer carries the aircraft model designations exactly as it appears on the manufacturer's application, including use of hyphens or decimal points, and should match what is stamped on the aircraft's data or nameplate. What the manufacturer chooses to call an aircraft for marketing or promotional purposes is irrelevant to the airworthiness authorities. The first amendment to the DC-9 type certificate for the new MD-80 aircraft was applied as DC-9-81, which approved on August 26, 1980. All MD-80 models have since been approved under additional amendments to the DC-9 type certificate.)

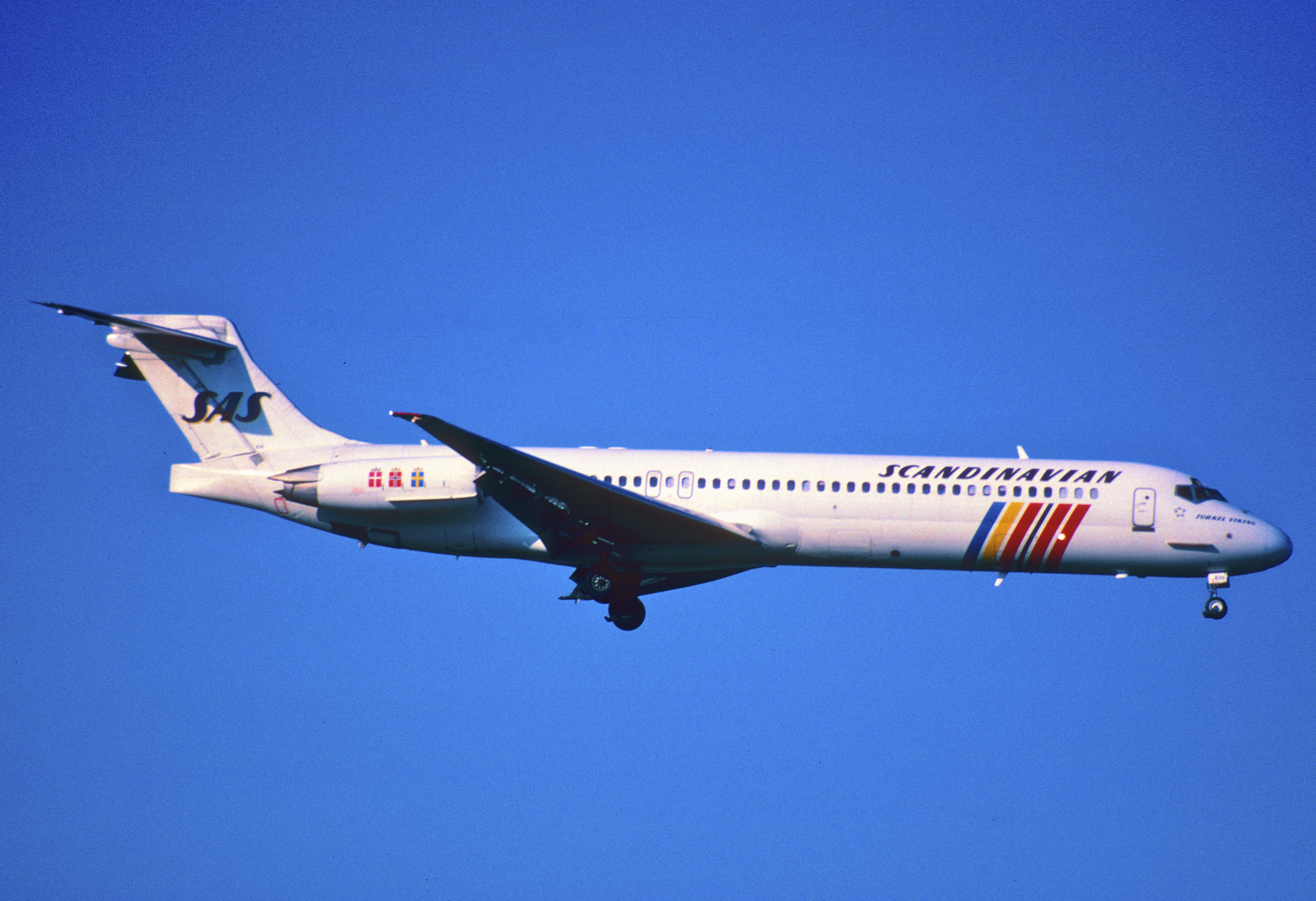
An MD-87 operated by Scandinavian Airlines. The shortest variant, certified in October 1987.

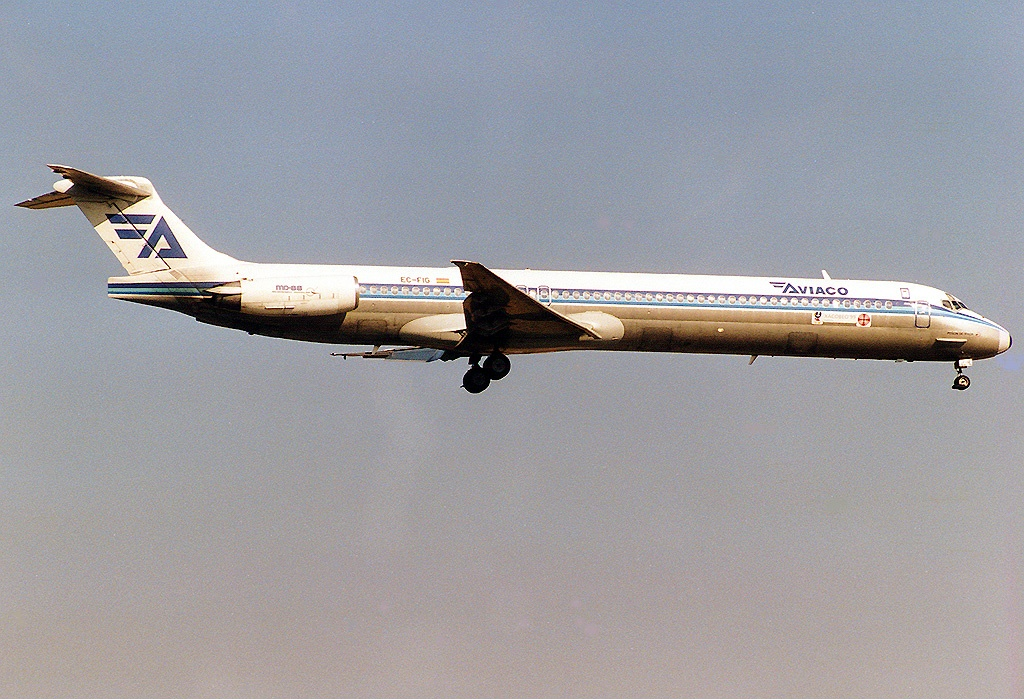
An MD-88 operated by Aviaco. The last and only variant certified with MD- prefix in December 1987.

The MD-87 and MD-88 made their first flight on December 4, 1986, and August 15, 1987, respectively. Although not certified until October 21, 1987, McDonnell Douglas had already applied for models DC-9-87 and DC-9-87F on February 14, 1985. The third derivative was similarly officially designated DC-9-87 (MD-87), although no nameplates were stamped DC-9-87. For the MD-88, an application for a type certificate model amendment was made after the earlier changes, so there was not a DC-9-88, which was certified on December 8, 1987. The FAA's online aircraft registry database shows the DC-9-88 and DC-9-80 designations in existence but unused.

==== Type conversion (STC) ====
Type conversions were programs started in 2010 by third parties with support from the TC holder (Boeing, as this was only happening after the merger with McDonnell Douglas in 1997) to convert used MD-80 passenger airliners and provide the required supplemental type certificate (STC) from FAA or EASA.

===== AEI MD-80SF (freighter) =====
The MD-80SF was a freighter conversion program for the MD-80 series launched in February 2010, where the suffix SF stands for special freighter. The conversion company, the Aeronautical Engineers Inc. (AEI) based in Miami, Florida, had noticed that pre-owned MD-80s could be bought for under $1 million, and at $2.5M for the freighter conversion, an MD-80FS could offer a narrowbody freighter for half the price of a Boeing 737-400SF. The first conversion was undertaken on an ex-American Airlines MD-82 aircraft (FSN 49470 built in 1987), which was used as a test-bed for the supplemental type certificate. The MD-80SF made its inaugural flight on September 28, 2012. AEI was the first and solely firm authorized by Boeing to receive the STC, ST02434LA, for the longer variants of the MD-80 series from the FAA in February 2013. The converted freighter with the designation AEI MD-80SF would have a payload of 47,000 pounds (21.1 t) and the ability to take 12 pallets measuring 88 by 108 inches (2.2 m × 2.7 m), which would be a good replacement for the Boeing 727 freighter The first converted freighter, an AEI MD-82SF (the prototype), was delivered to the launch customer, Everts Air Cargo, in February 2013.

In 2013, after the first delivery, AEI had orders for 20 MD-80SF freighters, expecting more than 100 conversions over ten years. Despite the initial lively interest, the uptake had been sluggish. AEI had six MD-80s converted by 2015, and three more were on the books for that year. Demand for the MD-80SF was disappointing due to two factors. First, the MD-80's cross section does not match the narrowbody freighter types used by the integrators, severely limiting the market for the freighter. Second, the values of the 737-400SF fell faster than expected, closing the gap with the MD-80SF, which burns 12 percent more fuel. In October 2015, the MD-80SF was approved by the EASA with Doc. No. 10055029. In 2021, after the COVID-19 pandemic, demand for cargo aircraft increased and the initial capital cost of an MD-80SF including conversion, paint and heavy maintenance was less than $5M, (~$5.85 million in 2025) half the cost of a 737-400SF, which made it attractive again. In March 2021, Aeronautical Engineers Inc. (AEI) signed a contract to convert three MD‑88s into dedicated freighters (MD‑88SF) for USA Jet Airlines, with the first aircraft entering conversion in March and the remaining aircraft scheduled in May and August. AEI itself had delivered 21 AEI MD-80SF freighters, two were in progress and six had been ordered.

===== EAT MD-87 (firefighter) =====
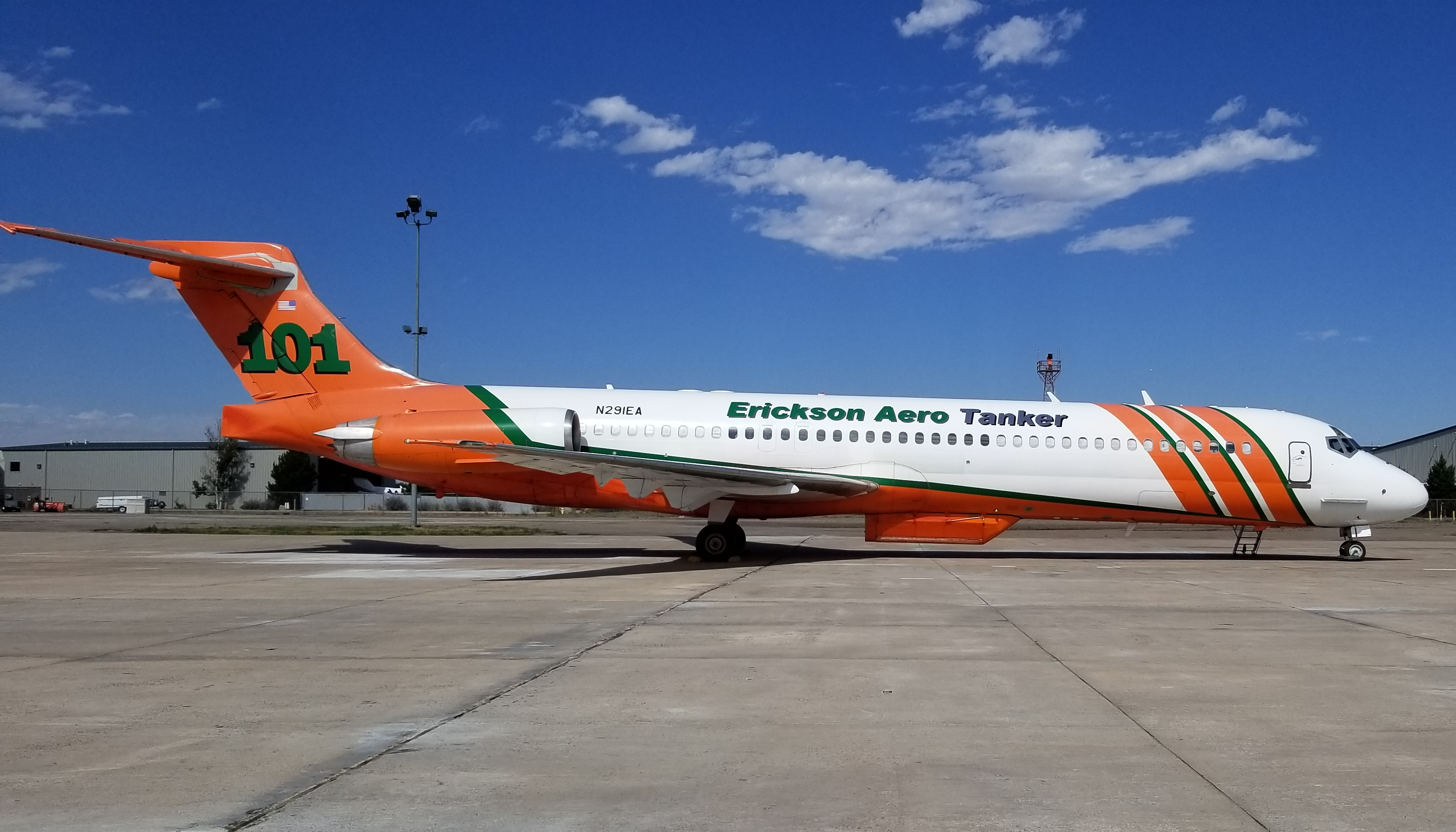
An EAT MD-87 for aerial firefighting was certified by FAA in 2014. Note the external ventral tank which adds a 4 ft "vertical safety distance" between the released retardant flow and the engines.

The FAA issued the Doc. No. STC ST02507LA, for Erickson Aero Tanker, LLC, located in Hillsboro, Oregon (referred to as "EAT") in 2014 to certify their EAT MD-87 firefighters. In the said STC, EAT MD-87 air tankers are required to drop retardant with landing gear down to prevent stalling. The dedicated test pilot said that during a test with the external tank, the FAA representative was not satisfied with the aircraft's response after being placed deep in the stall (beyond the stall warnings, stick shaker, and stick pusher). In early 2017, EAT petitioned the FAA for an exemption from this requirement, 14 CFR 25.201(b)(1), and requested a "Flaps 40/Landing Gear Up" configuration while dropping, but on June 28, 2017, that exemption was denied with the reason given by the FAA that it would have allowed aerial firefighting retardant drops in a configuration that does not fully meet the stall characteristics requirements on the modified DC-9-87 (MD-87) aircraft. EAT was then working on an additional layer of status display to complement the existing system.

=== Entry into service ===
The launch operator Swissair put the MD-81 into service on October 10, 1980, with a flight from Zurich to London Heathrow. The MD-82, MD-83, MD-87, and MD-88 entered service later with Republic Airlines in August 1981, Alaska Airlines in February 1985, Austrian Airlines in November 1987, and Delta Air Lines in January 1988, respectively.

=== Production ===
The second generation (later named MD-80s) was produced on a common line with the first generation DC-9s, with which it shares its line number sequence. After the delivery of 976 DC-9s and 108 MD-80s, McDonnell Douglas stopped DC-9 production. Hence, commencing with the 1,085th DC-9/MD-80 delivery, an MD-82 for VIASA in December 1982, only second generation or MD-80s were produced.

In 1985, McDonnell Douglas, after years of negotiating attributed to Gareth C.C. Chang, president of a McDonnell Douglas subsidiary, signed an agreement for joint production of MD-80s and MD-90s in the People's Republic of China. The agreement was for 26 aircraft, of which 20 were eventually produced along with 2 MD-90 aircraft. Upon cancellation of the co-production program, China refused to return the tooling used to McDonnell Douglas, and subsequently used it and the fuselage cross-section design in what became the Comac ARJ21 regional jet.

During 1991, MD-80 production had reached a peak of 12 per month, having been running at approximately 10 per month since 1987 and was expected to continue at this rate in the near term (140 MD-80s were delivered in 1991). As a result of the decline in the air traffic and a slow market response to the MD-90, MD-80 production was reduced, and 84 aircraft were handed over in 1992. A further production rate cut resulted in 42 MD-80s delivered during 1993 (3.5 per month) and 22 aircraft were handed over. MD-80 production ended in 1999, with the final MD-80, an MD-83 registered as N984TW, being delivered to Trans World Airlines.

=== Other proposals ===
==== MD-89 ====
In 1984–1985, McDonnell Douglas proposed a 173-passenger, 152-inch (390 cm; 12.7 ft; 3.9 m) stretch of the MD-80 called the MD-89, which would use the International Aero Engines V2500 engine instead of the regular JT8D-200 series engines. The MD-89 was intended to have two 57-inch (140 cm; 4.8 ft; 1.4 m) fuselage plugs forward of the wing and one 38-inch (97 cm; 3.2 ft; 0.97 m) fuselage plug aft of the wing. IAE and McDonnell Douglas announced an agreement to jointly market this 160 ft 6 in (48.9 m) derivative on February 1, 1985, but the concept was subsequently deprioritized in favor of the proposed MD-91 and MD-92 derivatives using ultra-high bypass (UHB) propfan engines. By 1989, however, lack of airline orders for the UHB derivatives caused McDonnell Douglas to return to the IAE V2500 engines to launch its MD-90 series aircraft.

==== MD-80 Advanced ====
In order to better manage the transition from the second generation, MD-80, to the third generation, MD-90, McDonnell Douglas revealed at the end of 1990 that it would be developing an MD-80 "improvement package" with the intent to offer beginning in early 1991 for delivery from mid-1993. The aircraft concept became known as the MD-80 Advanced. The "main improvement" was the installation of Pratt & Whitney JT8D-290 engines (never built) with a 1.5-inch (3.8 cm) larger diameter fan that would allow for a 6 dB reduction in exterior noise. The MD-80 Advanced was to incorporate the advanced flight deck of the MD-88, including a choice of reference systems, with an inertial reference system as standard fitting and optional attitude-heading equipment. It was to be equipped with an electronic flight instrument system (EFIS), an optional second flight management system (FMS), and light-emitting diode (LED) dot-matrix electronic engine and system displays. A Honeywell wind-shear computer and provision for an optional traffic-alert and collision avoidance system (TCAS) were also to be included. A completely new passenger compartment design would have a 12% increase in overhead baggage space and stowage compartment lights that come on when the doors open, as well as new video system featuring drop-down LCD monitors above. These changes would be also available by retrofit to existing MD-80s. Due to lack of market interest, McDonnell Douglas dropped its plans to offer the MD-80 Advanced during 1991.

In the course of 1993, a "mark 2" MD-80 Advanced version reappeared with the modified JT8D-290 engines as previously proposed. In late 1993, Pratt & Whitney launched a modified version of the JT8D-200 series, the -218B, which was being offered for the DC-9X re-engining program, and was also evaluating the possibility of developing a new JT8D for possible retrofit on the MD-80. The 18,000-to-19,000-pound (80 to 85 kN) thrust -218B engine version shares a 98% commonality with the existing engine, with changes designed to reduce NOx, improve durability, and reduce noise levels by 3 dB. The 218B could be certified in early to mid-1996. The new engine, dubbed the "8000", was to feature a new fan of increased diameter (by 1.7 inches or 4.3 centimetres), extended exhaust cone, a larger LP compressor, a new annular burner, and a new LP turbine and mixer. The initial thrust rating would be around 21,700 pounds (97 kN). A launch decision on the new engine was expected by mid-1994, but never occurred. The engine would also be available on new build MD-80s. McDonnell Douglas also evaluated the addition of winglets on the MD-80.

=== Further developments ===
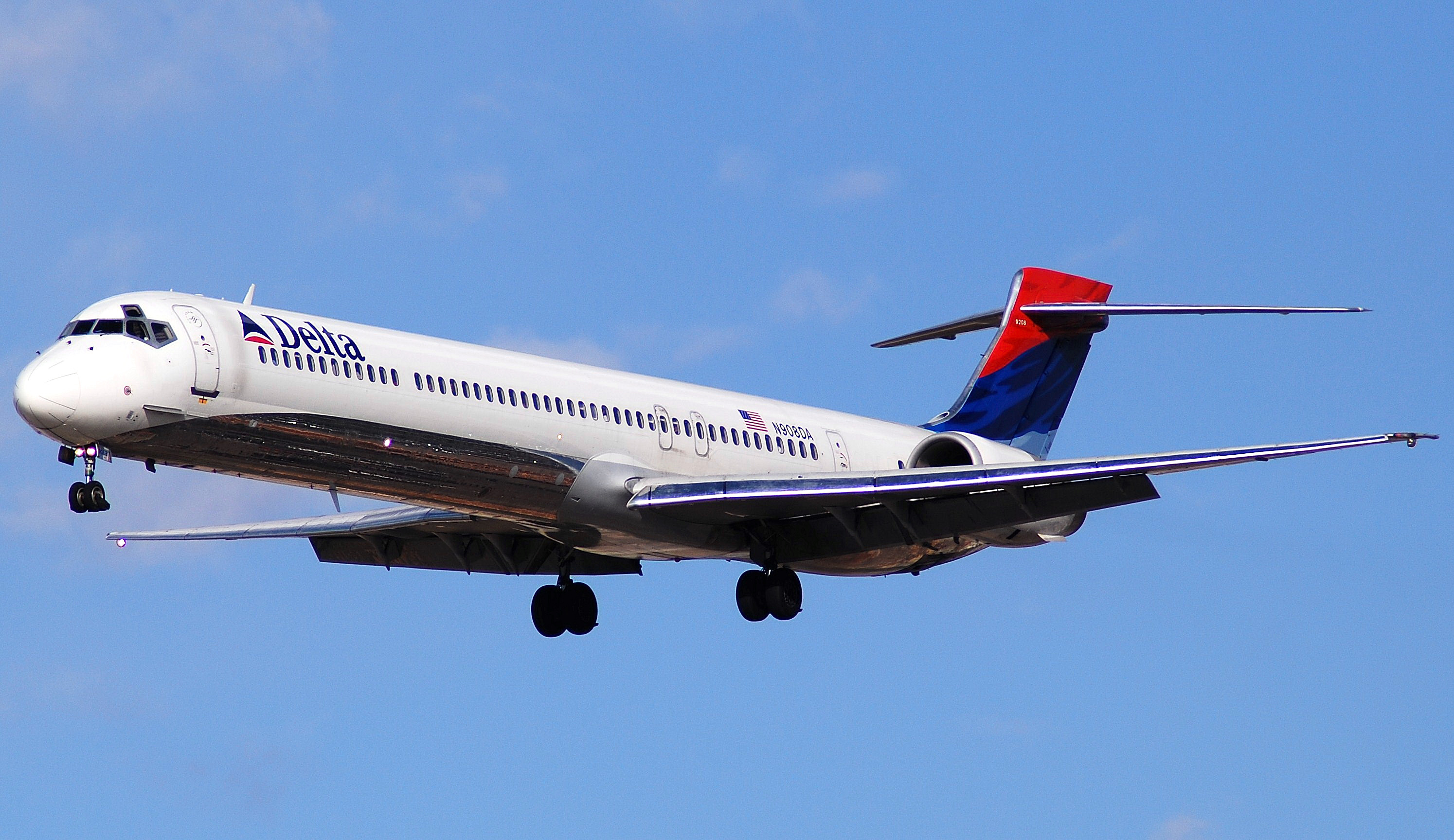
An MD-90 of Delta Air Lines, both its launch customer and last operator

==== MD-90 ====
The MD-90 was developed from the MD-80 series and is a 5-foot-longer (1.5 m), updated version of the MD-88 with a similar electronic flight instrument system (EFIS) (glass cockpit), and improved, and quieter IAE V2500 high-bypass turbofan engines. The MD-90 program began in 1989, first flew in 1993, and entered commercial service in 1995. The MD-90ER extended range version was also offered. Delta Air Lines flew the final MD-90 passenger flight on June 2, 2020, marking the retirement of the type.

==== MD-95 ====
The MD-95 was developed to replace early DC-9 models, which were approaching 30 years of age. The project completely overhauled the original DC-9 into a modern airliner. It is slightly longer than the DC-9-30 and is powered by new Rolls-Royce BR715 engines. The MD-95 was renamed "Boeing 717" after the McDonnell Douglas-Boeing merger in 1997.

== Design ==
The MD-80 series is a mid-size, medium-range airliner, featuring a fuselage 14 ft 3 in (4.34 m) longer than the DC-9-50. The small, highly efficient wing design of the baseline aircraft was enlarged by adding sections at the wing root and tip for a 28% larger wing. The aircraft derivative retains the configuration of two rear fuselage-mounted turbofan engines, a T-tail, and has cockpit, avionics and aerodynamic upgrades. The airliner is designed for frequent, short-haul flights for up to 172 passengers depending on airplane version and seating arrangement.

=== Flight deck ===
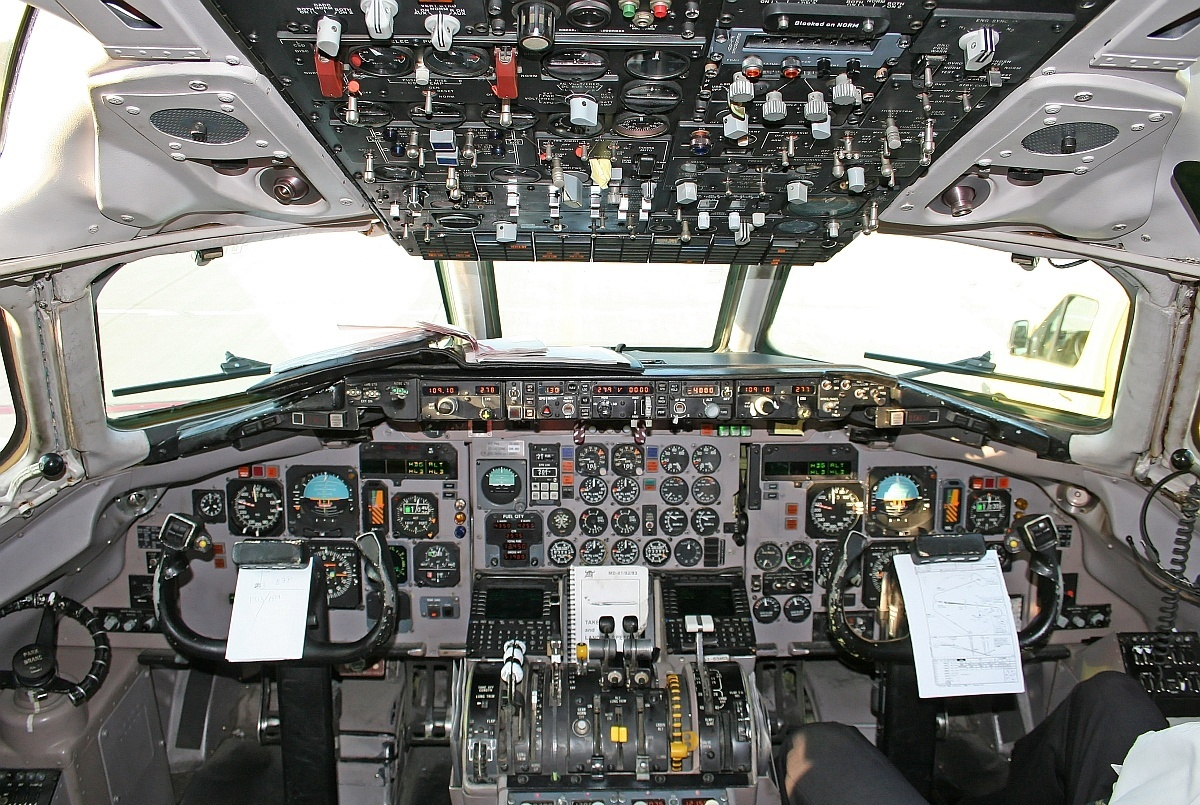
MD-83 Flight deck

The flight deck of the MD-80 aircraft featured advancements from the previous DC-9 series aircraft. Electro-mechanical instrumentation with an attitude-heading reference system was standard, with a multi-panel electronic flight instrument system standard on later build aircraft. Earlier aircraft were upgradeable to EFIS instrumentation. A full flight management system or Performance Management Computer was offered. A traffic alert and collision avoidance system, a state-of-the-art inertial reference system, and LED dot-matrix displays for engine and system monitoring were all available on later build aircraft as standard.

=== Avionics ===
The MD-80 features an advanced avionics suite which includes two autonomous digital flight guidance computers. It is also equipped with a glareshield-mounted flight guidance control panel, flight director, autothrottle, thrust mode selection system, and an autoland system.

=== Cabin ===
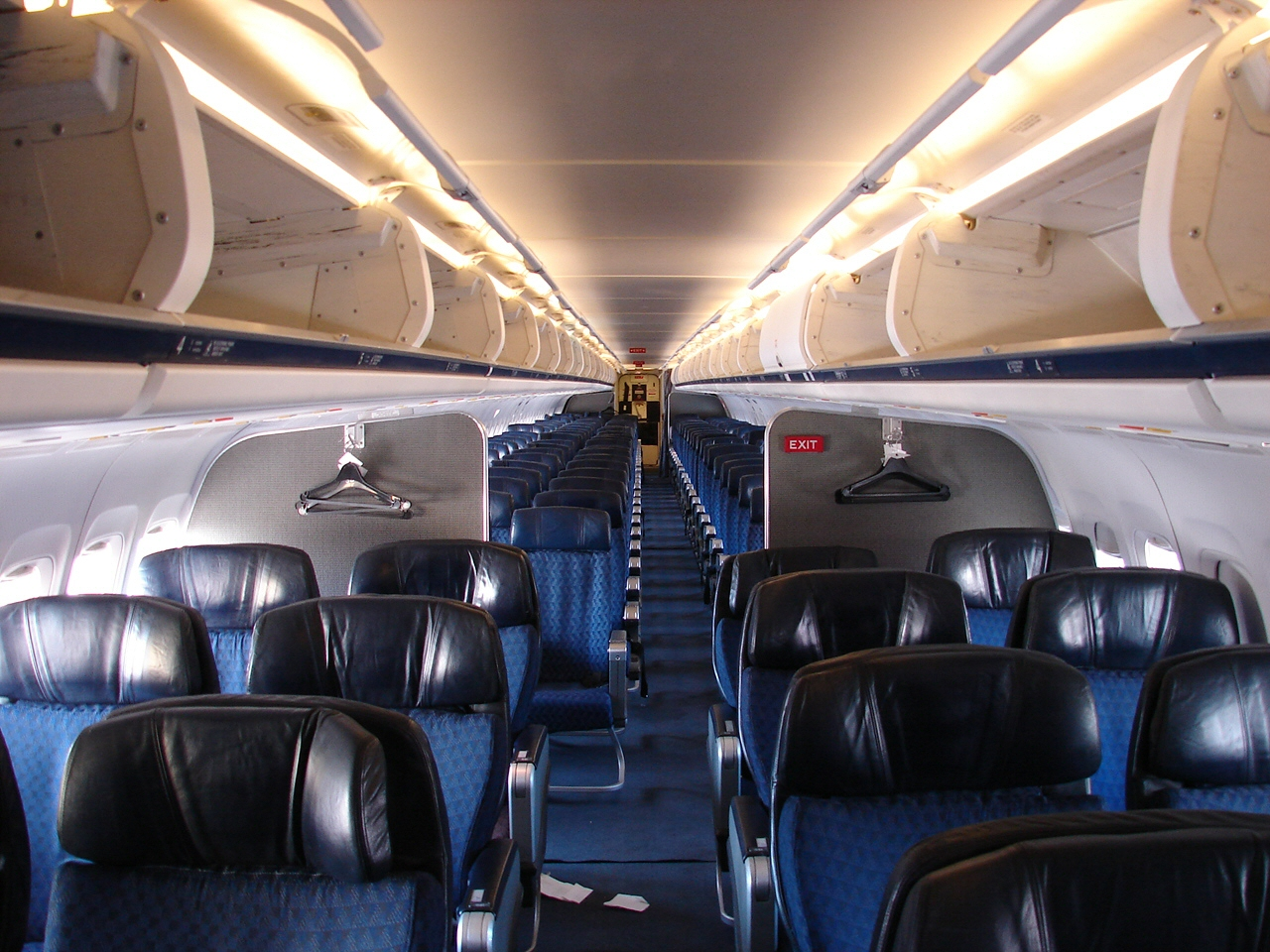
Five-abreast coach seating and four-abreast premium seating of the MD-80

The cabin typically has 3 to 6 rows in the first class section with four-abreast seating, and around 25 rows in the main cabin with five-abreast seating.

=== Engines ===
The MD-80 is powered by two more powerful, more efficient and quieter Pratt & Whitney JT8D-209 turbofan engines, which are a significant upgrade over the smaller JT8D-15, -17, -11, and -9 series. Each engine can produce 18,000 to 21,000 lb (82 to 93 kN) of thrust. The JT8D-209 is an advanced engine operated by 350 operators to power around 4,500 aircraft. The engine provides high reliability and low maintenance costs. The engine operates at 77–84 °F (25–29 °C) flat–rated temperature.

=== Performance ===
The maximum and cruise speed of the aircraft are 499 and 438 kn (575 and 504 mph; 925 and 811 km/h), respectively. It has a maximum range of 1,564 nmi (1,800 mi; 2,897 km) and a fuel capacity of 5,840 US gal (22,106 L). The aircraft weights around 77,800 lb (35,300 kg). The maximum take-off weight is 140,000 lb (63,500 kg).

== Operational history ==
=== Passenger ===
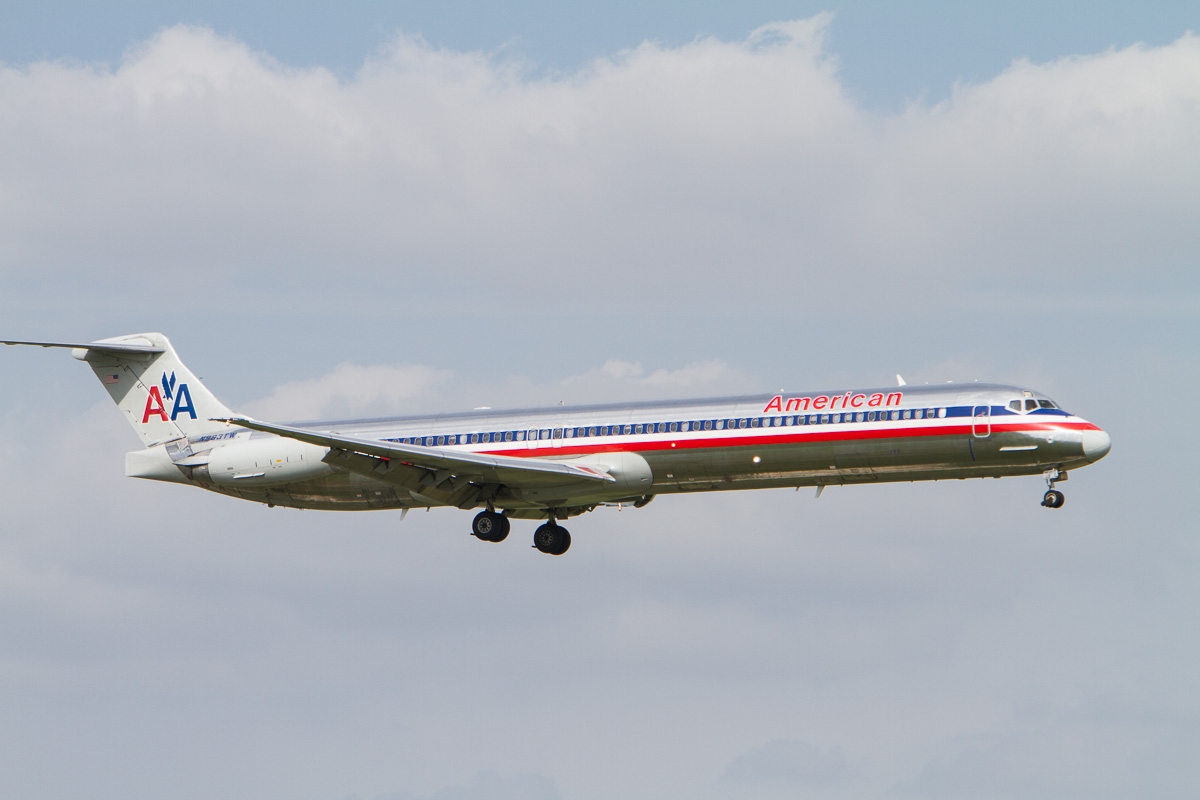
One of the final MD-80s built, an MD-83 for Trans World Airlines, operating for American Airlines after the two companies merged.

The second-generation, MD-80 series, passenger airliners have longer fuselages as well as longer range than their earlier counterparts, the first-generation of the DC-9 family. Some customers, such as American Airlines, still refer to the airplanes in fleet documentation as the Super 80, their former designation. Comparable airliners to the MD-80 series include the Boeing 737-400 and Airbus A319. It was the most delivered MD- series and often nicknamed as the Mad Dog by the operators, has been used by airlines around the world. Major customers have included Aerolíneas Argentinas, Aeroméxico, Aeropostal Aerorepublica, Alaska Airlines, Alitalia, Allegiant Air, American Airlines, Aserca, Austral Líneas Aéreas, Austrian Airlines, Avianca, China Eastern Airlines, China Northern Airlines, Delta Air Lines, Finnair, Iberia, Insel Air, Japan Air System (JAS), Korean Air, Lion Air, Martinair Holland, Pacific Southwest Airlines (PSA), Reno Air, Scandinavian Airlines System (SAS), Spanair, Spirit Airlines, Swissair, Trans World Airlines and Meridiana.

American Airlines was the first US major carrier to order the MD-80 when it leased twenty 142-seat aircraft from McDonnell Douglas in October 1982 to replace its Boeing 727-100s. It committed to 67 firm orders plus 100 options in March 1984, and in 2002 its fleet peaked at more than 360 aircraft, 30% of the 1,191 produced. The MD-80 was the workhorse of the airline's fleet throughout the 1980s and beyond.

Due to the use of the aging JT8D engines, the MD-80 is not fuel efficient compared to the A320 or newer 737 models; it burns 1,050 US gal (4,000 L; 870 imp gal) of jet fuel per hour on a typical flight, while the larger Boeing 737-800 burns 850 US gal (3,200 L; 710 imp gal) per hour (19% reduction). In the 2000s many airlines began to retire the type. Alaska Airlines' tipping point in using the 737-800 was the $4 per gallon price of jet fuel the airline was paying by the summer of 2008; the airline stated that a typical Los Angeles-Seattle flight would cost $2,000 less, using a Boeing 737-800, than the same flight using an MD-80.

In late March 2008 and again in early April 2008, an FAA safety audit of American Airlines forced the airline to ground all its MD-80 series aircraft (approximately 300) to inspect the wiring for one of the aircraft's hydraulic systems. This led to American canceling nearly 2,500 flights in March and over 3,200 in April. In addition, Delta Air Lines voluntarily inspected its own MD-80 fleet to ensure its 117 MD-80s were also operating within regulation. This resulted in Delta canceling 275 flights.

Midwest Airlines announced on July 14, 2008, that it would retire all 12 of its MD-80s (used primarily on routes to the West Coast) by the fall. The JT8D's comparatively lower maintenance costs due to simpler design help narrow the fuel cost gap.

American Airlines announced that it would remove all of its MD-80s by 2019, replacing them with 737-800s. The airline flew its final MD-80 revenue flights on September 3 and 4, 2019 before retiring its 26 remaining aircraft. The final MD-80 flight on September 4, 2019, Flight 80, flew from Dallas/Fort Worth to Chicago–O'Hare. The retired planes were flown later to the New Mexico desert to be mothballed. One former American Airlines MD-83 – the last ever built – was readied for use in January 2025, being delivered to TezJet in Kyrgyzstan on May 22.

Delta Air Lines was expected to retire its MD-80 series jetliners at the end of 2020, but instead the airline began accelerating the fleet retirement in March 2020 when the COVID-19 pandemic saw passenger levels drop critically low for airlines. On June 2, 2020, the final flights arrived at Delta's home base and hub Hartsfield-Jackson Atlanta International in Atlanta from Dulles International Airport in Virginia, outside of Washington, D.C., and George Bush International Airport in Houston. This was the last scheduled passenger service in the US of any McDonnell Douglas airliner. Delta's MD-80 fleet was put into storage.

=== Freighter ===
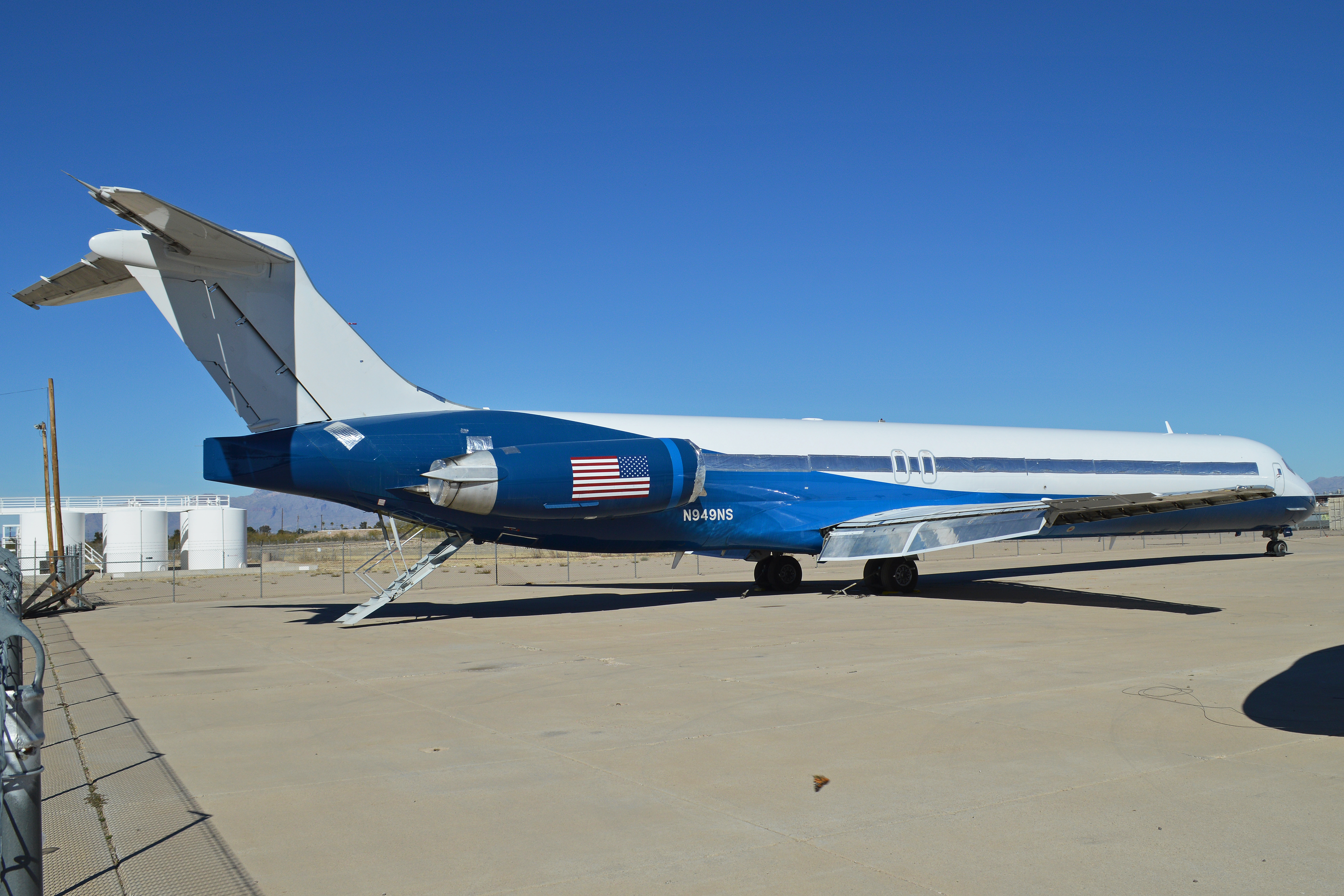
An MD-82SF freighter of the conversion launch operator, USA Jet Airlines, at Tucson International Airport

In February 2013, Commercial Jet Inc. (CJI) delivered the first AEI MD-80SF, an MD-82SF (the prototype), to Everts Air Cargo, the launch customer of the MD-80SF passenger-to-freighter conversion program by the Aeronautical Engineers Inc. (AEI). In August 2013, USA Jet Airlines became the launch operator of the MD-80SF freighter conversion program with an MD-88SF. The cargo airline purchased 15 MD-88 aircraft from Delta, 6 of which would be converted and the other 9 used as spares.

In 2021, most operators used the AEI MD-80SF freighter to carry Ford Motor Co. and General Motors automotive parts from Mexico to the US, but it was also used in Alaska for general freight and fish. The MD-80SF has a low deck height that allows it to load cargo from a pickup truck when needed, which is not possible on a Boeing 757 freighter. However, its cross section is too narrow to transport standard "A" type containers and instead a dozen non-standard 88-by-108-inch (2.2 m × 2.7 m) containers or pallets, which is the main disadvantage in cargo operations.

In late July 2022, Everts Air Cargo (EAC) selected Universal Avionics, an Elbit Systems company, to deliver cockpit upgrades (avionics, FMS with LPV capability, and integrated GPS) for its MD-80SF aircraft to improve safety and operational efficiency. EAC specializes in transporting freight and mail in Alaska and uses its MD-80SF fleet to supply on demand charter service operations throughout the United States, Canada, Mexico, and Caribbean Islands.

=== Firefighter ===
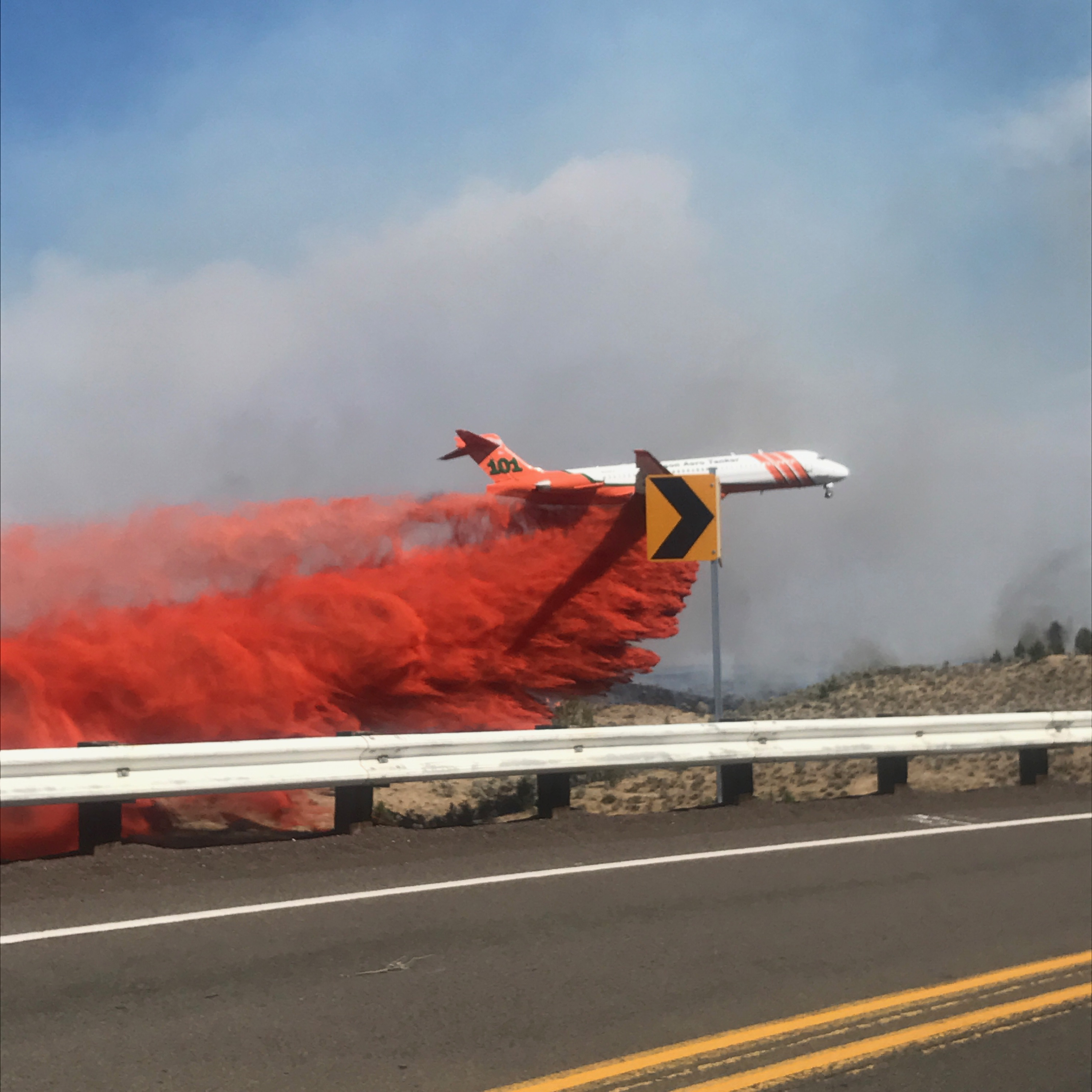
An EAT MD-87 air tanker with landing gear down during the retardant drop onto the Boxcar Fire in Central Oregon in 2018.

As of July 2024, Erickson Aero Tanker operates seven 34-year-old MD-87 aircraft converted for use as aerial firefighting air tankers for the US Forest Service, California Department of Forestry and Fire Protection and other government agencies. The MD-87 air tanker's capacity is 4,000 US gallons (15,000 L; 3,300 imp gal) or 1,920 US gallons (7,300 L; 1,600 imp gal) more than the capacity of the Lockheed P-2 Neptune tankers, and 1,000 US gallons (3,800 L; 830 imp gal) more than Bae-146 tankers. That is significantly less than the 19,000-US-gallon (72,000 L; 16,000 imp gal) capacity of the 747 Global Super Tanker, but nonetheless, the MD-87 is much more cost-effective to operate and can use more austere fields with shorter runways. The MD-87 firefighter is loaded using one or two (individual or simultaneously) 3-inch (76 mm) coupled loading ports on each side of the fuselage. These ports can sustain up to 600 US gallons per minute (2,300 L/min; 500 imp gal/min) flow maximum. Few, if any tanker bases use both ports, loading using a single port at an average flow rate of 450 US gallons per minute (1,700 L/min; 370 imp gal/min), giving the load time of under seven minutes.

Another notable feature of the MD-87 tanker, as well as Douglas DC-7's and some other large tanker-modified aircraft, is that the plane can be flown with the landing gear down during the retardant drop, which reduces airspeed while allowing higher engine RPMs, reducing lag on post-drop climb out- similar to a speed brake. Occasionally, only the main gear are extended with nose gear stowed. When pulling off or up after a retardant drop the pilots simply want as much aircraft performance available as possible.

== Variants ==
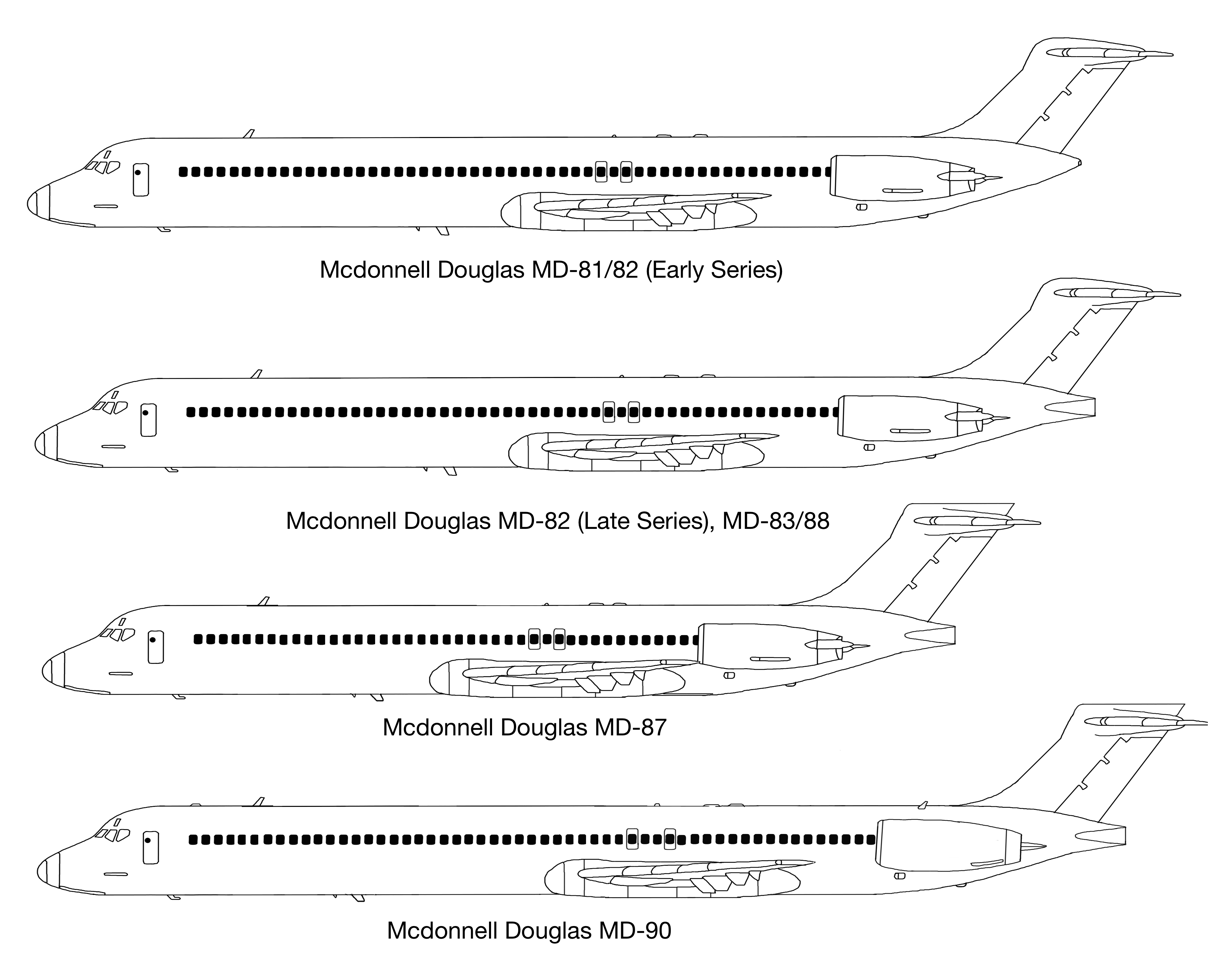
Douglas MD-80 Family, top to bottom: MD-81/82, MD-83/88, MD-87, MD-90

References: Flight International's Commercial Aircraft of the World 1981, 1982, 1983, Jane's All the World's Aircraft 1994–1995, and 2004–2005.

Dimensions
The basic "long-body" MD-80 versions (MD-81, MD-82, MD-83, and MD-88) have an overall length of 147 ft 10 in (45.06 m), and a fuselage length of 136 feet 5 inches (41.58 m) that is 15.2 ft (4.62 m) longer than the DC-9-50 and 44 ft (13.5 m) longer than the initial DC-9, the Series 10. Wingspan was also increased by 14 ft (4.4 m) in comparison with earlier DC-9s at 107 feet 10.2 inches (32.873 m). The aircraft's passenger cabin, from cockpit door to aft bulkhead, is 101 feet (31 m) long and, as with all versions of the DC-9, has a maximum cabin width (trim-to-trim) of 123.7 inches (3.14 m).

Powerplant
The initial production version of the MD-80 was the Pratt and Whitney JT8D-209 18,500 lb (82 kN) thrust-powered MD-81. Later build MD-81s have been delivered with more powerful JT8D-217 and -219 engines.

APU
All versions of the MD-80 are equipped with an AlliedSignal (Garrett) GTCP85-98D APU as standard, which is located in the aft fuselage.

Flight deck
The MD-80 is equipped with a two crew flightdeck similar to that on the DC-9 from which it evolved. Later models could be equipped to a higher specification with EFIS displays in place of the traditional analogue instruments, TCAS, windshear detection, etc. An EFIS retrofit to non-EFIS-equipped aircraft is possible.

Cabin
Typical passenger-cabin seating arrangements include:
A mixed-class, with aft full-service galley, configuration for a total of 135 passengers with 12 first class, four-abreast 36-inch seat pitch.
123 economy-class passengers, five-abreast, 32-inch pitch.
All-economy layout for 155 passengers, five-abreast, 32- and 33-inch pitch.
A typical high-density layout is for 167 in one class (i.e., Airtours).

Undercarriage
All versions of the MD-80 are equipped with a tricycle undercarriage, featuring a twin nose unit with spray deflector and twin main units with rock deflectors. The MD-80T, developed for the Chinese, differs in that the main units are each fitted with a four-wheel double-main-bogey undercarriage to reduce pavement loading.

Aerodynamic improvements
From mid-1987, new low-drag "beaver" tail cones originally used on MD-83 and -87 were introduced on all early series of MD-80s, reducing drag and improving fuel burn. Some operators have been modifying the old DC-9-style cones on earlier-build MD-80s to the new low-drag style. Scandinavian Airlines System has done this, citing the improved economics and cosmetics from the modification.

=== MD-81 ===
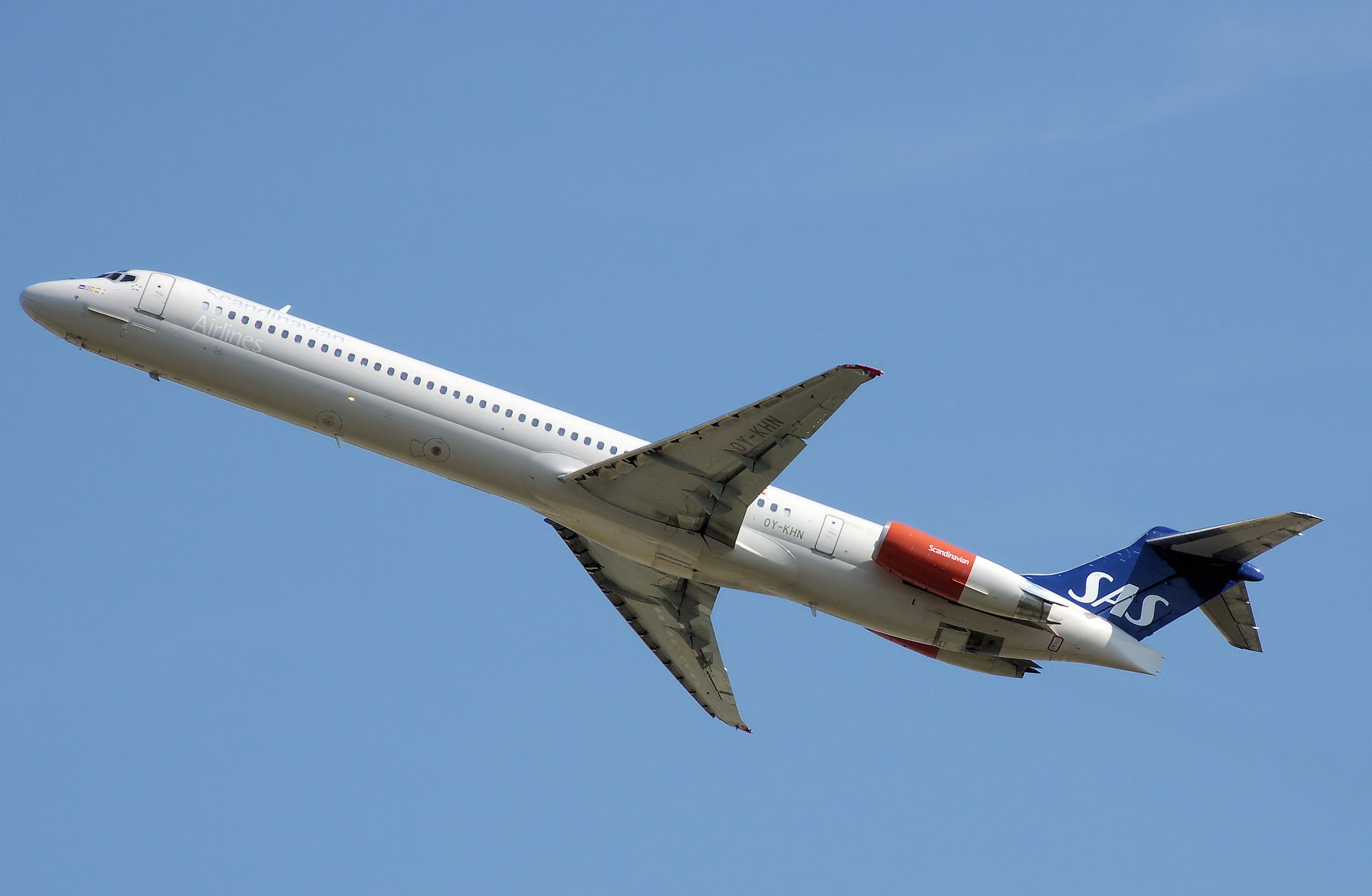
Scandinavian Airlines MD-81 taking off

The MD-81 (originally known as the DC-9 Super 81 or DC-9-81) was the first production model of the MD-80, and apart from the MD-87, the differences between the various long-body MD-80 variants are relatively minor. The four long-body models (MD-81, MD-82, MD-83, and MD-88) only differ from each other in having different engine variants, fuel capacities, and weights. The MD-88 and later-build versions of the other models have more up-to-date flight decks featuring EFIS.

Performance
Standard maximum take-off weight (MTOW) on the MD-81 is 140,000 lb (63,500 kg) with the option to increase to 142,000 lb (64,400 kg). Fuel capacity is 5,840 US gallons (22,100 L; 4,860 imp gal), and typical range, with 155 passengers is 1,565 nmi (2,898 km; 1,801 mi).

MD-81 timeline

- Formal launch: October 1977
- First flight: October 18, 1979
- FAA certification: August 25, 1980
- First delivery: September 13, 1980, to Swissair
- Entry into service: October 10, 1980, with Swissair on a flight from Zurich to Heathrow.
- Last delivery: June 24, 1994, to JAL Domestic

=== MD-82 ===
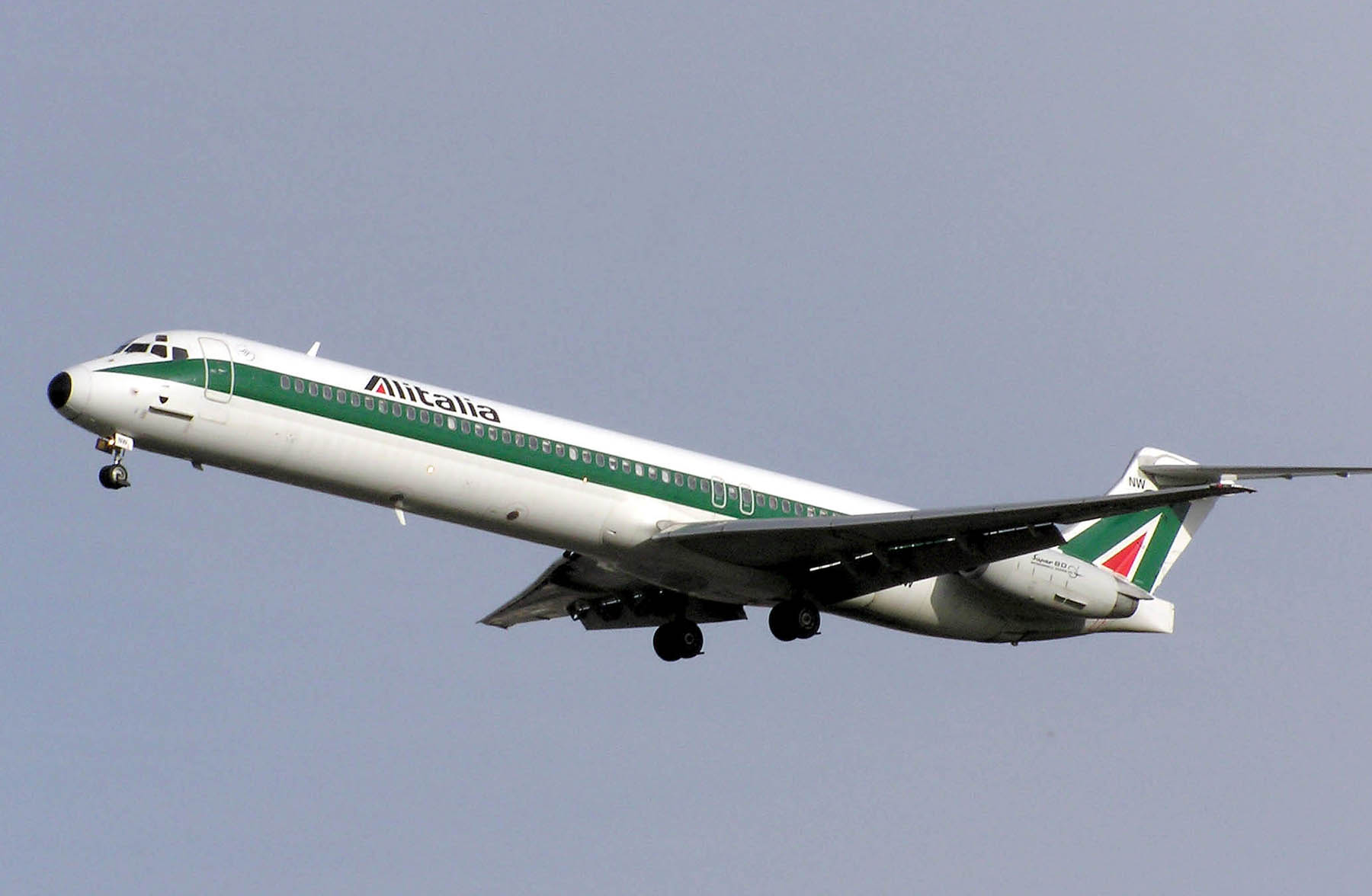
Alitalia MD-82

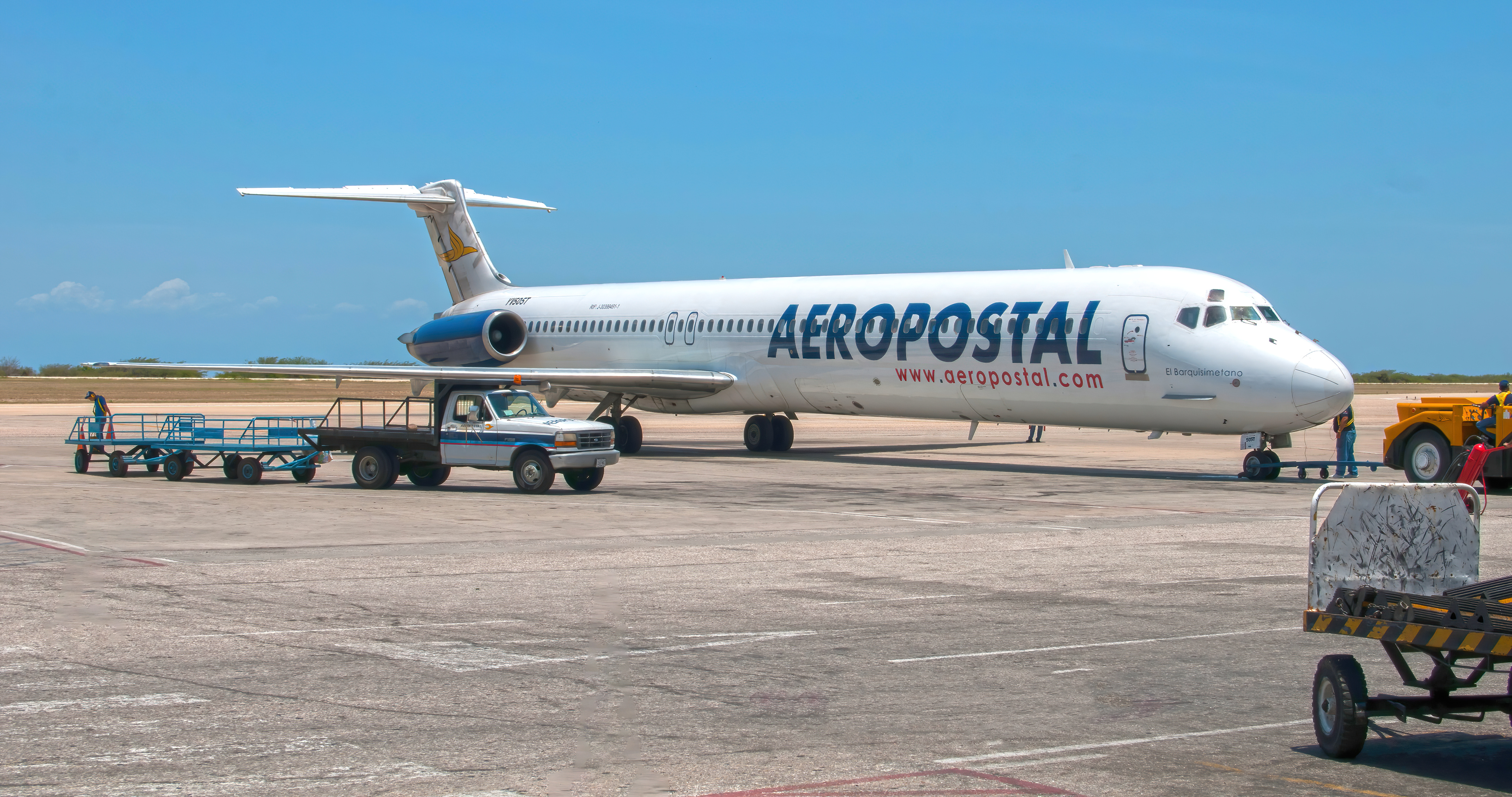
Aeropostal MD-82

Announced on April 16, 1979, the MD-82 (DC-9-82) was a new MD-80 variant with similar dimensions to those of the MD-81 but equipped with more powerful engines. The MD-82 was intended for operation from 'hot and high' airports but also offered greater payload/range when in use at 'standard' airfields. American Airlines was the world's largest operator of the MD-82, with at one point over 300 MD-82s in the fleet.

Originally certified with 20,000 lb (89 kN) thrust JT8D-217s, a -217A-powered MD-82 was certified in mid-1982 and became available that year. The new version featured a higher MTOW (149,500 lb or 67,800 kg), while the JT8D-217As had a guaranteed take-off thrust at temperatures up to 84 °F (29 °C) or 5,000 ft (1,500 m) altitude. The JT8D-217C engines were also offered on the MD-82, giving improved Thrust specific fuel consumption (TSFC). Several operators took delivery of the -219-powered MD-82s, while Balair ordered its MD-82s powered by the lower-thrust -209 engine.

The MD-82 features an increased standard MTOW initially to 147,000 lb (66,700 kg), and this was later increased to 149,500 lb (67,800 kg). Standard fuel capacity is the same as that of the MD-81, 5,840 US gal (22,100 L; 4,860 imp gal), and typical range with 155 passengers is 2,050 nmi (3,800 km; 2,360 mi).

MD-82 timeline

- Announced/go-ahead: April 16, 1979
- First flight: January 8, 1981
- FAA certification: July 29, 1981
- First delivery: August 5, 1981, to Republic Airlines
- Entry into service: August 1981 with Republic Airlines
- Last delivery: November 17, 1997, to U-Land Airlines of Taiwan

The MD-82 was assembled under license in Shanghai by the Shanghai Aviation Industrial Corporation (SAIC, today's COMAC) beginning in November 1986; the sub-assemblies were delivered by McDonnell Douglas in kit form. China had begun design on a cargo version, designated Y-13, but the project was subsequently canceled with the conclusion of the licensed assembly of the MD-82 and MD-90 in China. In 2012, Aeronautical Engineers Inc. performed the first commercial-freighter conversion of an MD-82.

=== MD-83 ===
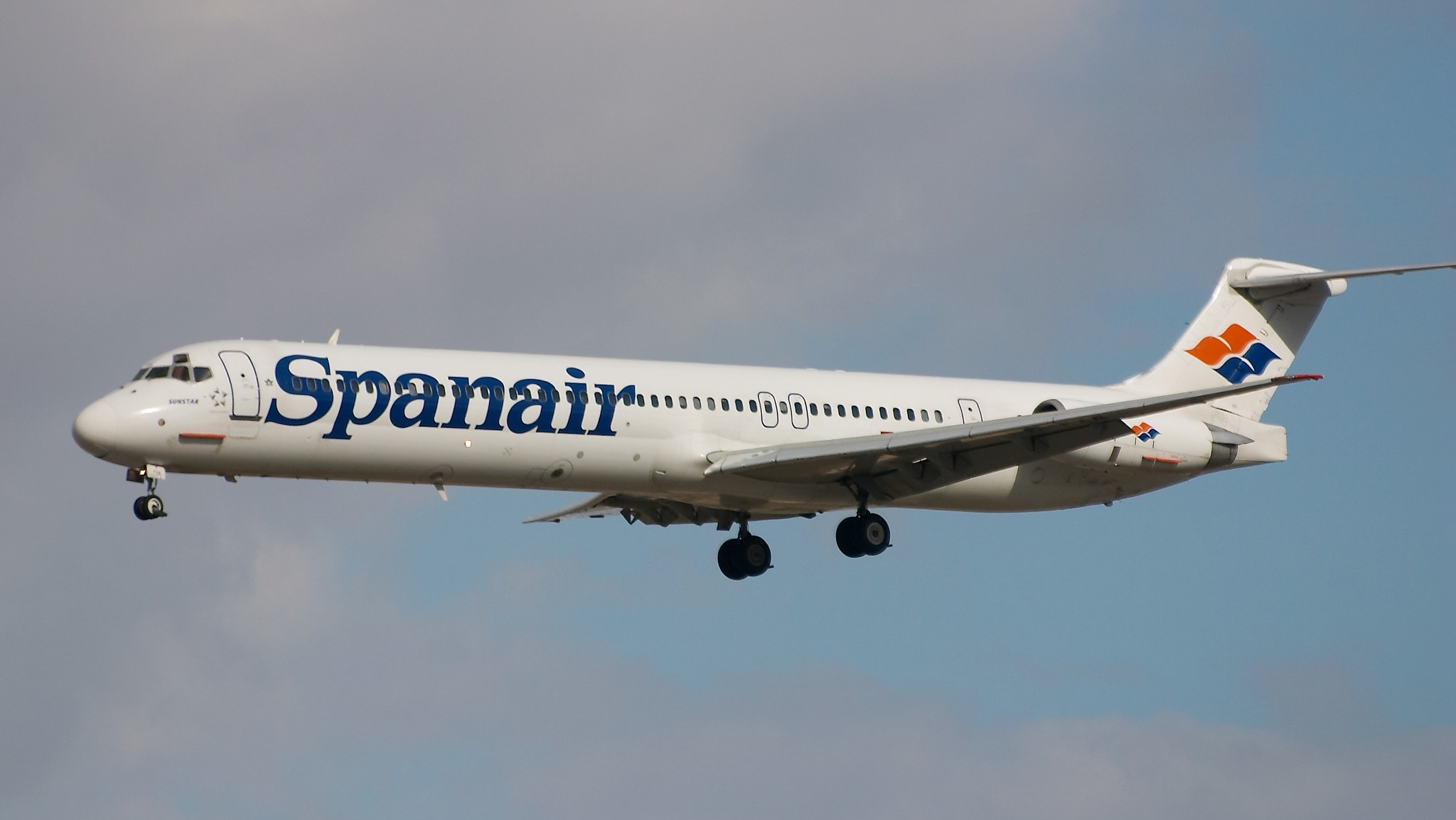
Spanair MD-83

The MD-83 (DC-9-83) is a longer-range version of the basic MD-81/82 with higher weights, more powerful engines, and increased fuel capacity.

Powerplant
Compared to earlier models, the MD-83 is equipped with slightly more powerful 21,000 lb (93 kN)-thrust Pratt and Whitney JT8D-219s as standard.

Performance
The MD-83 features increased fuel capacity as standard (to 6,970 US gal (26,400 L; 5,800 imp gal)), which is carried in two 565 US gal (2,140 L; 470 imp gal) auxiliary tanks located fore and aft of the center section. The aircraft also has higher operating weights, with MTOW increased to 160,000 lb (73,000 kg) and MLW to 139,500 lb (63,300 kg). Typical range for the MD-83 with 155 passengers is around 2,504 nautical miles (4,637 km; 2,882 mi). To cope with the higher operating weights, the MD-83 incorporates strengthened landing gear including new wheels, tires, and brakes, changes to the wing skins, front spar web and elevator spar cap, and strengthened floor beams and panels to carry the auxiliary fuel tanks. From MD-80 line number 1194, an MD-81 delivered in September 1985, it is understood that all MD-80s have the same basic wing structure and in theory could be converted to MD-83 standard.

MD-83 timeline

- Announced/go-ahead: January 31, 1983
- First flight: December 17, 1984
- FAA certification: October 17, 1985 (MTOW 149,500 lb (67,800 kg)). MTOW of 160,000 lb (73,000 kg) certified November 4, 1985.
- First delivery: February 1985 to Alaska Airlines – initially as -82 powered by -217A engines and certified as MD-82s. Alaska Airlines' first four aircraft were subsequently re-engined and re-certified as MD-83s.
- Entry into service: February 1985 with Alaska Airlines
- Last delivery: December 28, 1999, to Trans World Airlines (TWA)

=== MD-87 ===
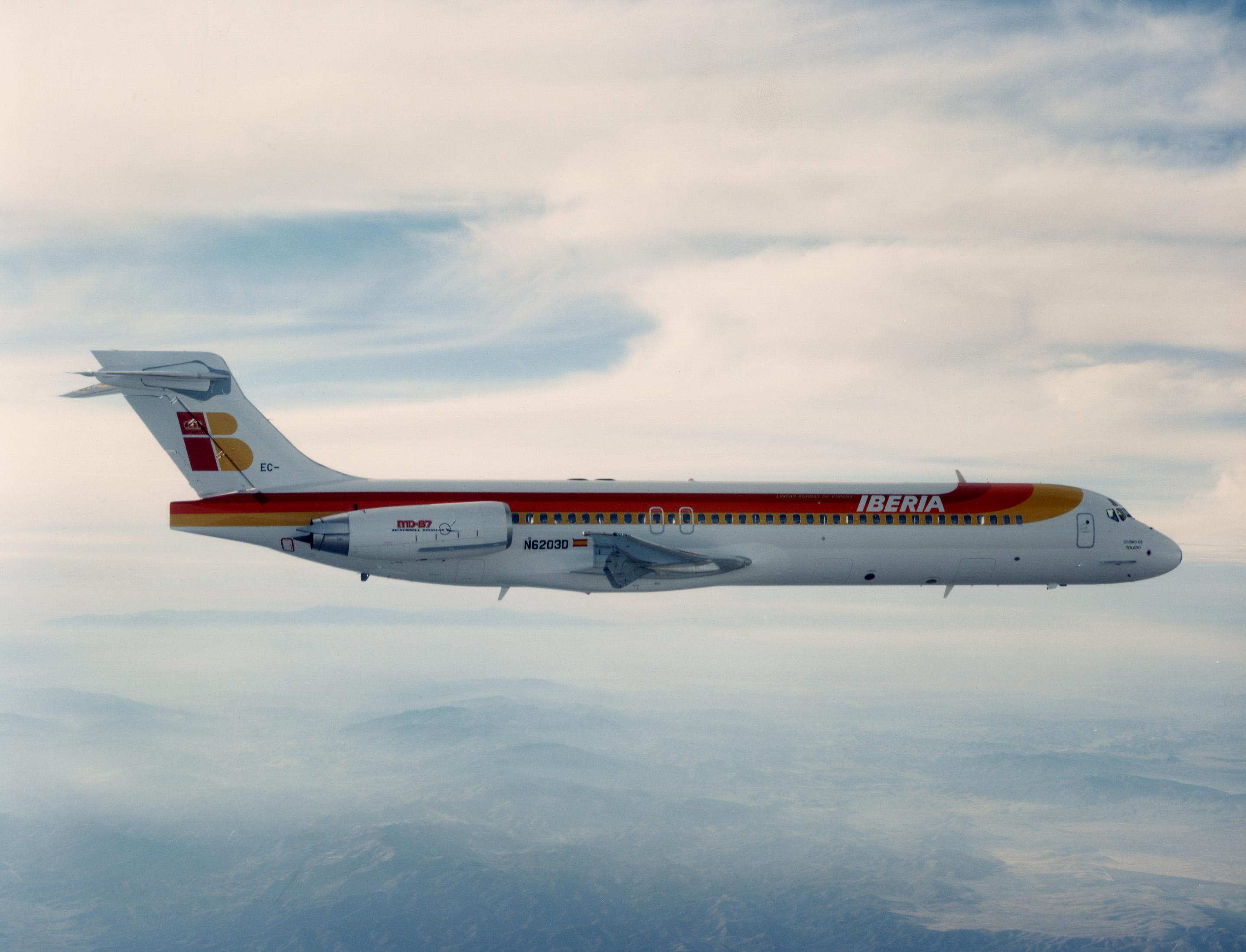
An Iberia MD-87

In January 1985, McDonnell Douglas announced it would produce a shorter-fuselage MD-80 variant, designated MD-87 (DC-9-87), which would seat between 109 and 130 passengers depending upon configuration. The designation was intended to indicate its planned date of entry into service, 1987.

Dimensions
With an overall length of 130 ft 5 in (39.75 m), the MD-87 is 17 ft 4 in (5.28 m) shorter than the other MD-80s but is otherwise generally similar to them, employing the same engines, systems and flight deck. The MD-87 features modifications to its tail, with a fin extension above the tailplane. It also introduced a new low-drag "beaver" tail cone, which became standard on all MD-80s.

Powerplant
The MD-87 was offered with either the 20,000 lb (89 kN) thrust JT8D-217C or the 21,000 lb (93 kN) thrust -219.

Performance
Two basic versions of the MD-87 were made available with either an MTOW of 140,000 lb (64,000 kg) and MLW of 128,000 lb (58,000 kg) or an MTOW of 149,000 lb (68,000 kg) and an MLW of 130,000 lb (59,000 kg). Fuel capacity is 5,840 US gal (22,100 L; 4,860 imp gal), increasing to 6,970 US gal (26,400 L; 5,800 imp gal) with the incorporation of two auxiliary fuel tanks. Typical range with 130 passengers is 2,370 nmi (4,390 km; 2,730 mi). It increased to 2,900 nmi (5,400 km; 3,300 mi) with two auxiliary fuel tanks.

Cabin
The MD-87 provides typical mixed-class seating for 114 passengers or 130 in an all-economy layout (five-abreast 31 in and 32 in seat pitch). The maximum seating, exit-limited, is for 139 passengers.

MD-87 timeline

- Announced/go-ahead: January 1985
- First flight: December 4, 1986
- FAA certification: October 21, 1987
- First delivery: November 27, 1987, to Austrian Airlines
- Last delivery: March 27, 1992, to Scandinavian Airlines (SAS)

=== MD-88 ===
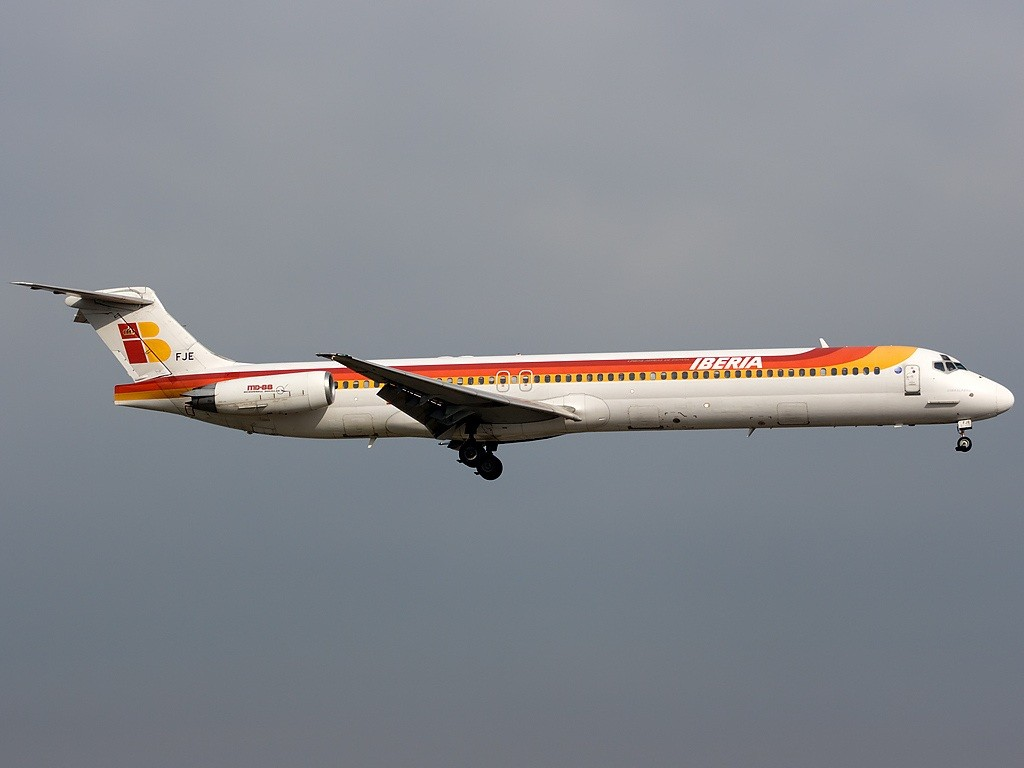
An Iberia MD-88

The MD-88 was the last variant of the MD-80, which was launched on January 23, 1986, on the back of orders and options from Delta Air Lines for a total of 80 aircraft.

The MD-88 is, depending on specification, basically similar to the MD-82 or MD-83 except it incorporates an EFIS cockpit instead of the more traditional analog flight deck of the other MD-80s. Other changes incorporated into the MD-88 include a wind-shear warning system and general updating of the cabin interior/trim. These detail changes are relatively minor and were written back as standard on the MD-82/83. The wind-shear warning system was offered as a standard option on all other MD-80s and has been made available for retrofitting on earlier aircraft including the DC-9.

Delta's initial eight aircraft were manufactured as MD-82s and upgraded to MD-88 specifications. MD-88 deliveries began in December 1987, and it entered service with Delta in January 1988. The final commercial passenger flight of an MD-88 within the United States took place on June 2, 2020, by a Delta flight from Washington Dulles to Atlanta. In 2021, Michigan's USA Jet Airlines added MD-88s to their ad-hoc operations' freighter fleet.

Performance
The MD-88 has the same weight, range, and airfield performance as the other long-body aircraft (MD-82 and MD-83) and is powered by the same engines. MDC quotes a typical range for the MD-88 as 2,050 nmi (3,800 km; 2,360 mi) with 155 passengers. Adding two additional auxiliary fuel tanks increases its 155-passenger range to 2,504 nmi (4,637 km; 2,882 mi) (similar to the MD-83). A Wall Street Journal article about the crash of Delta Air Lines Flight 1086 at New York City's LaGuardia Airport in March 2015 stated that "pilots and other safety experts have long known that when the MD-88's reversers are deployed, its rudder... sometimes may not be powerful enough to control deviations to the left or right from the center of a runway...safety board investigators, among other things, are looking to see if this tendency played any role in the crash..".

MD-88 timeline

- Announced/go-ahead: January 23, 1986
- First flight: August 15, 1987
- FAA certification: December 8, 1987
- First delivery: December 19, 1987, to Delta Air Lines
- Entry into service: January 5, 1988, with Delta Air Lines
- Last delivery: June 25, 1997, to Onur Air
- Final commercial flight in the US: June 2, 2020, by Delta Air Lines

=== Conversions ===
The freighter conversion is available for the longer variants of MD-80 series (the MD-81, MD-82, MD-83 and MD-88), while the firefighter conversion is for the shortest variant, the MD-87.

==== AEI MD-80SF (freighter) ====
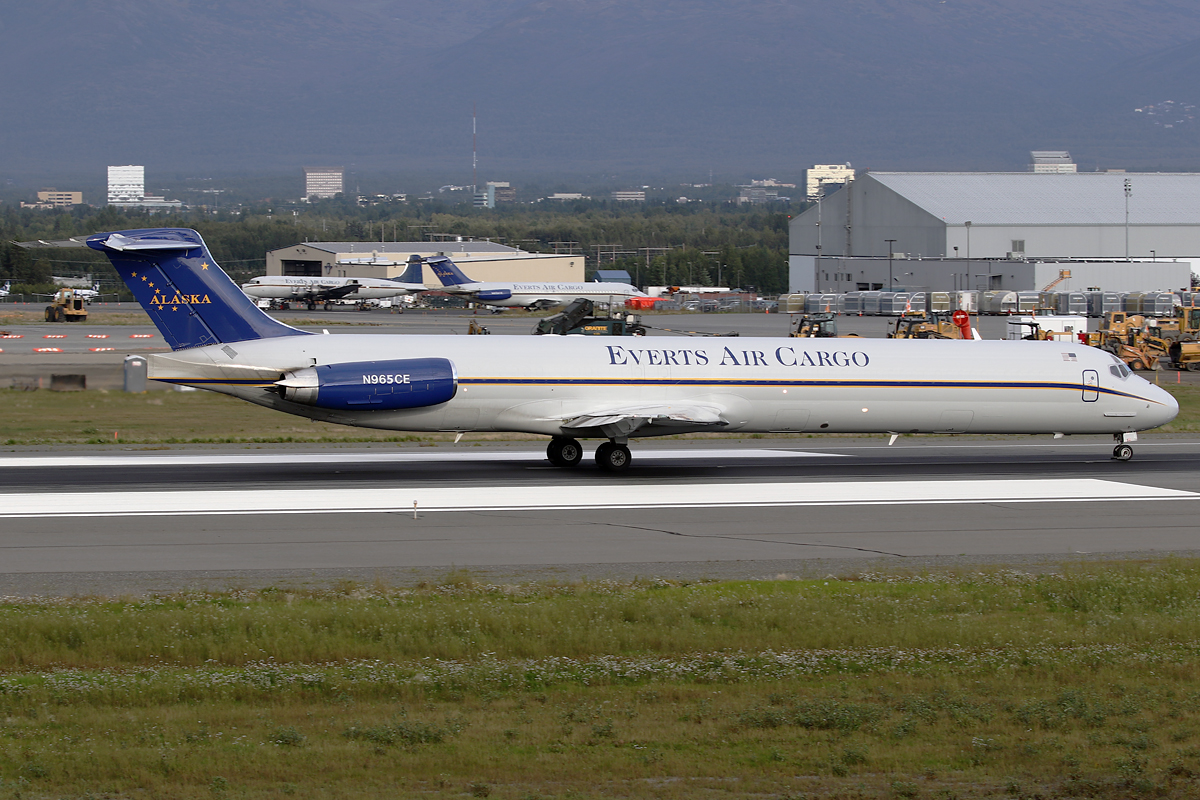
An MD-83SF of the launch customer of the freighter conversion program, Everts Air Cargo

In February 2010, the Aeronautical Engineers Inc. (AEI) announced it was beginning a freighter conversion program for the MD-80 series. The converted aircraft use the MD-80SF (MD-80 special freghter) designation. AEI is solely certified by FAA and EASA to perform conversions on the longer variants of MD-80 series (the MD-81, MD-82, MD-83 and MD-88). The AEI MD-80SF freighter conversion consists of the installation of a 85-by-136-inch (2.2 m × 3.5 m) large cargo door on the left side of the fuselage and modification of main deck to a Class E cargo compartment, with independent smoke detection system. Cabin windows replaced with lightweight aluminum window plugs. After conversion the freighter can carry twelve 88-by-108-inch (2.2 m × 2.7 m) or eight 125-by-88-inch (3.2 m × 2.2 m) ULDs or eight 125-by-96-inch (3.2 m × 2.4 m) ULDs. The cargo door is hydraulically operated and actuated from the inside of the aircraft by an independent system. Hydraulic pressure is available from two sources; an electrically operated hydraulic pump or a manual hand pump. The door control and manual pump are located on the 9 g barrier, allowing a single person to operate the door manually. The installation of cargo doors and other structural changes are performed by Commercial Jet Inc. (CJI), which is licensed to install the AEI-designed conversion kit at its Dothan, Alabama facility.

==== EAT MD-87 (firefighter) ====
In 2013, five MD-87 aircraft formerly operated by Scandinavian Airlines (SAS) were converted for aerial firefighting use by Aero Air / Erickson Aero Tanker (EAT). The external tank (pod) is installed below the retardant tank doors, lowering the release point by 46 inches (120 cm) and thus reducing the possibility of retardant spreading over the wing that could be further ingested into the engines. On May 30, 2019, AerSale, a global supplier of mid-life aircraft, engines, and maintenance, repair, and overhaul (MRO) services, announced that it had signed a contract with Aero Air / Erickson Aero Tanker to build the sixth MD-87 firefighting air tanker, beginning conversion on April 1, 2019, at AerSale's MRO facility in Goodyear, Arizona. The new air tanker will cruise at 450 knots (520 mph; 830 km/h), carry 3,000 US gallons (11,000 L; 2,500 imp gal) of fire retardant in all environments up to 104 °F (40 °C), have a 780-nautical-mile (900 mi; 1,400 km) loaded strike range, require only a 5,200-foot (1,600 m) runway loaded, and both take off and land fully loaded.

== Operators ==
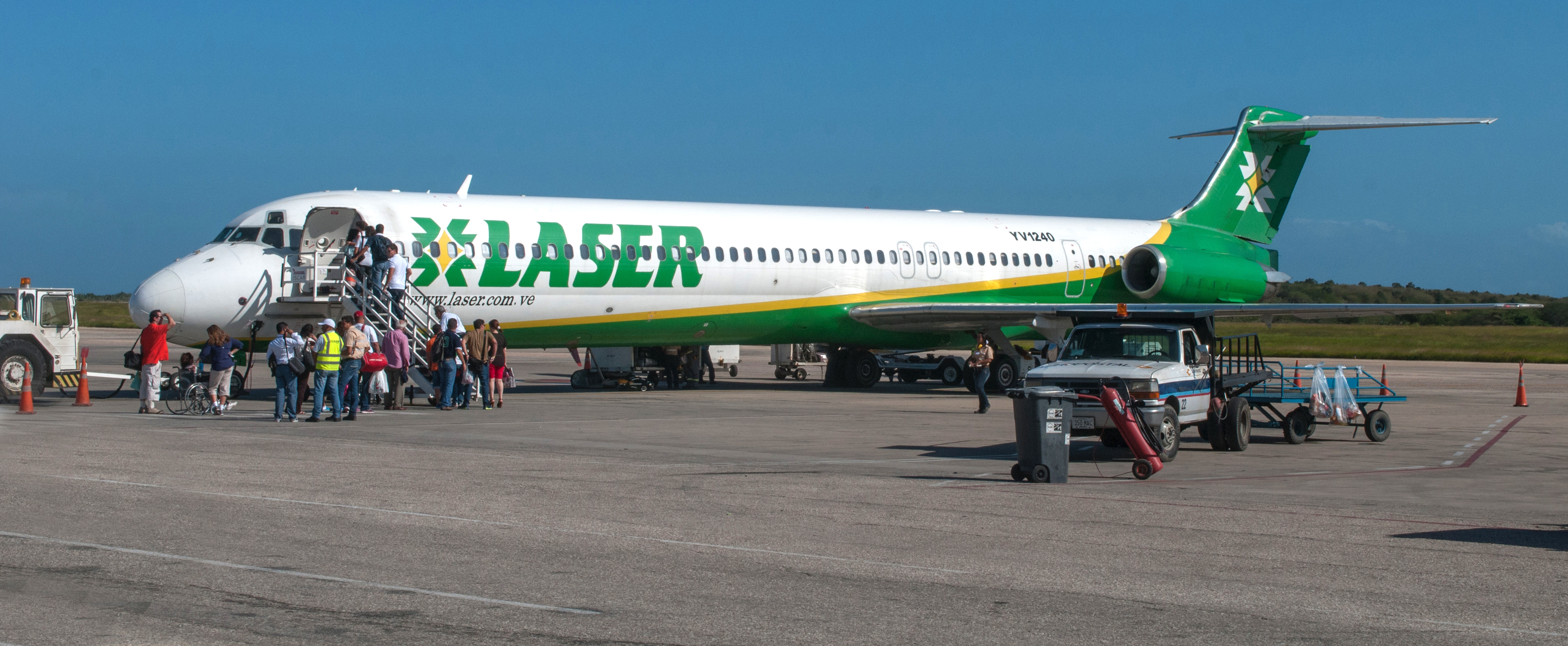
LASER Airlines is currently the largest scheduled passenger operator.

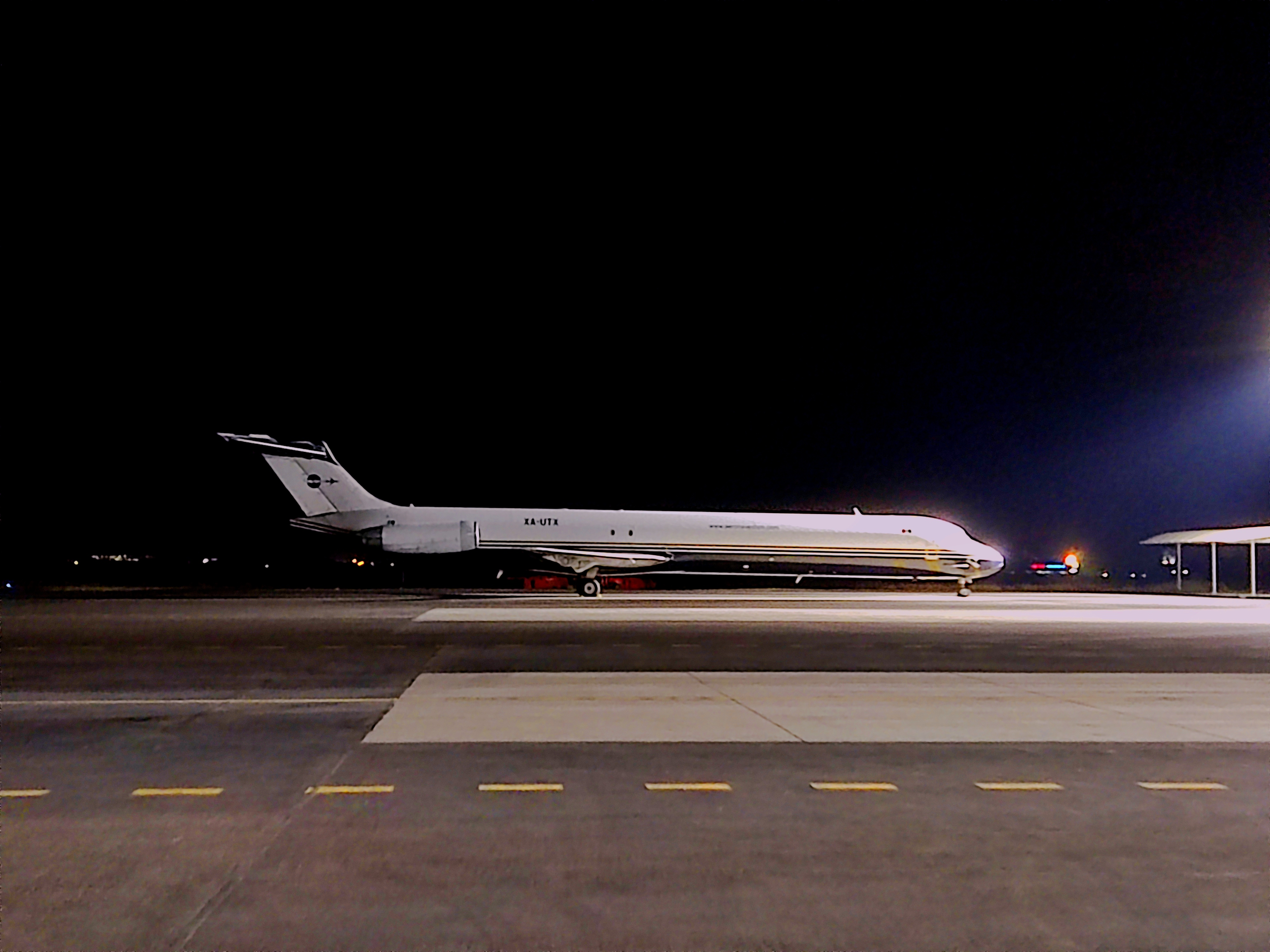
Aeronaves TSM is currently the largest MD-80SF freighter operator.

=== Current operators ===
As of August 2022, there were 116 MD-80 series aircraft in service with operators including Aeronaves TSM (15), World Atlantic Airlines (9), LASER Airlines (9), Everts Air (5), USA Jet Airlines (5), and other carriers with smaller fleets.

=== Former operators ===
Major airlines that operated the MD-80 series:

- Alaska Airlines retired its MD-80 series aircraft after making its last commercial flight on August 25, 2008.
- Alitalia operated 90 MD-82 from 1983 to 2012.
- American Airlines retired its MD-80 series aircraft after making its last commercial flight on September 4, 2019.
- Delta Air Lines retired its MD-88 and MD-90 aircraft on June 2, 2020.
- Northwest Airlines operated the MD-82 from 1986-1999 following the acquisition of Republic Airlines.
- Continental Airlines operated the MD-81, MD-82, and MD-83. The fleet was retired in 2005.
- Midwest Airlines operated the MD-81, MD-82 and MD-88. The fleet was retired in 2008.
- Allegiant Air operated the MD-82, MD-83, MD-87, and MD-88. The fleet was retired in 2018.
- European Air Charter operated the MD-82 as the last European operator. The fleet was retired in October 2023.

=== Deliveries ===
Deliveries
Type	Total	1999	1998	1997	1996	1995	1994	1993	1992	1991	1990	1989	1988	1987	1986	1985	1984	1983	1982	1981	1980
MD-81	132						3	3	5	15	5	8	6	4	9	8	1	1	11	48	5
MD-82	539			2	2	13	8	14	18	48	48	37	51	50	64	55	43	50	23	13	
MD-82T	30						1	1	2	6	8	6	4	2							
MD-83	265	26	8	9	10	5	11	12	25	26	30	26	26	31	12	8					
MD-87	75								5	13	25	15	14	3							
MD-88	150			5				13	29	32	23	25	19	4							
MD-80 series	1,191	26	8	16	12	18	23	43	84	140	139	117	120	94	85	71	44	51	34	61	5

== Accidents and incidents ==
As of April 2024, the MD-80 series has been involved in 90 major aviation accidents and incidents, including 47 hull-losses, with 1,446 fatalities of occupants.

=== Accidents with fatalities ===
- On December 1, 1981, Inex-Adria Aviopromet Flight 1308, an MD-82 (YU-ANA), crashed into Corsica's Mt. San Pietro during a holding pattern for landing at Campo dell'Oro Airport, Ajaccio, France. All 180 passengers and crew were killed. This was the first-ever fatal incident involving the MD-80 series and also the deadliest.
- On August 16, 1987, Northwest Airlines Flight 255, an MD-82, crashed shortly after takeoff from Detroit Metropolitan Wayne County Airport because the flight crew failed to use the taxi checklist to ensure that flaps and slats were extended for takeoff, according to the US National Transportation Safety Board (NTSB). All crew and 154 passengers were killed, with the exception of a four-year-old girl, Cecelia Cichan. Two people on the ground were also killed.
- On June 12, 1988, Austral Líneas Aéreas Flight 046, an MD-81 (N1003G), crashed short of the runway at Libertador General José de San Martín Airport, in Posadas, Misiones. All 22 passengers and crew were killed.
- On October 26, 1993, China Eastern Airlines Flight 5398, an MD-82 (B-2103), overran the runway on landing at Fuzhou Yixu Airport in poor visibility due to pilot error, killing 2 of the 80 on board.
- On November 13, 1993, China Northern Airlines Flight 6901, an MD-82 (B-2141) crashed before landing at Ürümqi Diwopu International Airport in Xinjiang, China, killing 12 of the 102 passengers and crew on board.
- On November 22, 1994, TWA Flight 472, an MD-82, struck a Cessna 441 Conquest II during takeoff, resulting in 2 fatalities on the Cessna. There were 8 injuries among the 140 people on board the MD-82, but no fatalities.
- On July 6, 1996, Delta Air Lines Flight 1288, an MD-88, attempting to take off from Pensacola Regional Airport experienced an uncontained, catastrophic turbine engine failure that caused debris from the front compressor hub of the number one left engine to penetrate the left aft fuselage. The penetrating debris left two passengers dead and two severely injured; all were from the same family. The pilot aborted takeoff, and the airplane stopped on the runway.
- On June 1, 1999, American Airlines Flight 1420, an MD-82, attempting to land in severe weather conditions at Little Rock Airport, overshot the runway and crashed into the banks of the Arkansas River. Eleven people, including the captain, died.
- On January 31, 2000, Alaska Airlines Flight 261, an MD-83, crashed in the Pacific Ocean because it lost horizontal stabilizer control. All 88 passengers and crew on board were killed. Following the crash, an improperly maintained Acme nut and jackscrew recovered from the aircraft were found to be excessively worn. An airworthiness directive (AD) was issued by the FAA requiring more frequent inspections and lubrication of the jackscrew assembly.
- On May 25, 2000, Air Liberte Flight 8807, an MD-83, (F-GHED), collided with Streamline Flight 200, a Short 330-200, (G-SSWN), during takeoff at Charles de Gaulle Airport, Paris, France. No one aboard the MD-83 was injured, while one person was killed and another injured on the Short 330.
- On October 8, 2001, Scandinavian Airlines Flight 686, an MD-87 (SE-DMA) collided with a Cessna Citation CJ2 jet (D-IEVX) during takeoff at Linate Airport, Milan, Italy. The runway collision left 118 people dead and remains the deadliest air disaster in Italy. The cause of the accident was a misunderstanding between air traffic controllers and the Cessna jet, complicated by inoperative ground movement radar at the time of the accident. The SAS crew had no role in causing the accident.
- On May 7, 2002, China Northern Airlines Flight 6136, an MD-82 (B-2138), from Beijing to Dalian, crashed into Dalian Bay near Dalian after the pilot reported "fire on board". All 112 people on board were killed. Investigators determined that the fire had been set by a suicidal passenger.
- On November 30, 2004, Lion Air Flight 538, an MD-82, crashed on landing at Adi Sumarmo Airport in Surakarta, Indonesia and overran the end of the runway, killing 25 of 163 on board.
- On August 16, 2005, West Caribbean Airways Flight 708, an MD-82, crashed in a mountainous region in northwest Venezuela killing all 152 passengers and eight crew.
- On September 16, 2007, One-Two-GO Airlines Flight 269, an MD-82, crashed at the side of the runway and exploded after an apparent attempt to execute a go-around in bad weather at Phuket International Airport in Phuket, Thailand. Of the 130 passengers and crew on board, 90 were killed.
- On November 30, 2007, Atlasjet Flight 4203, an MD-83, crashed in the southwestern province of Isparta, Turkey, killing all 50 passengers and 7 crew. The cause of the crash was attributed to pilot spatial disorientation.
- On August 20, 2008, Spanair Flight 5022, an MD-82 (EC-HFP), from Madrid's Barajas Airport crashed shortly after takeoff on a flight to Las Palmas de Gran Canaria in the Canary Islands. The MD-82 had 162 passengers and 10 crew on board, of whom 18 survived. The crash was caused by attempting to take off with the flaps and slats retracted. The flight crew omitted the "set flaps and slats" item in both the After Start checklist and the Takeoff Imminent checklist. The takeoff warning system (TOWS), which should have emitted an audio warning on the runway when the throttles were advanced for takeoff with the airplane wrongly configured for takeoff, did not sound.
- On June 3, 2012, Dana Air Flight 0992, an MD-83 (5N-RAM), crashed into a two-story building in Lagos, Nigeria, caused by engine failure. All 153 passengers and crew on board were killed, as well as 6 on the ground.
- On July 24, 2014, Air Algérie Flight 5017, an MD-83, registration EC-LTV, a scheduled flight from Ouagadougou, Burkina Faso, to Algiers, Algeria, operated with an MD-83 leased from Swiftair. The aircraft crashed southeast of Gossi, Mali, about 50 minutes after takeoff. All 110 passengers and 6 crew were killed.

=== Hull losses, incidents and hijackings ===
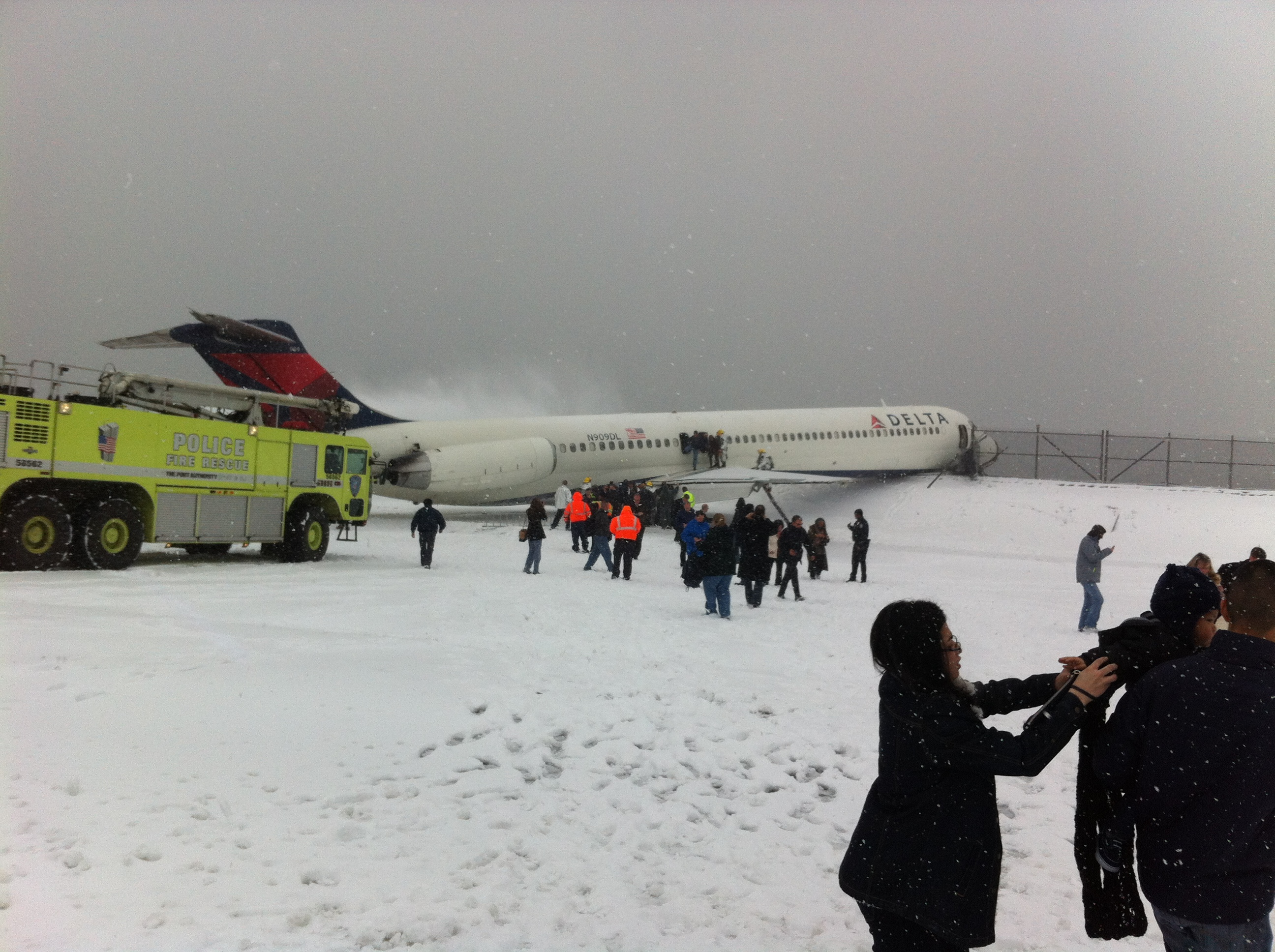
Delta Air Lines Flight 1086 resting on the seawall following its overrun at La Guardia

- On February 3, 1988, American Airlines Flight 132, an MD-83, caught fire before landing. The aircraft made an emergency landing. All 126 people on board survived, with 18 injured. The aircraft was repaired and returned to service.
- On December 27, 1991, SAS Flight 751, an MD-81 (OY-KHO, Dana Viking), crash-landed at Gottröra, Sweden. In the initial climb, both engines ingested ice broken loose from the wings (although they had been properly deiced before departure). The ice damaged the compressor blades causing compressor stall. The stall further caused repeated engine surges that finally destroyed both engines, leaving the aircraft with no thrust. The aircraft landed in a snowy field and broke into three parts. No fire occurred, and all aboard survived.
- On November 3, 1994, Scandinavian Airlines System Flight 347, an MD-82, was hijacked shortly after take-off. The hijacker was Haris Keč, who made demands that Norwegian authorities help to stop the humanitarian suffering in his home country caused by the Bosnian War. No one was injured in the incident.
- On November 12, 1995, American Airlines Flight 1572, an MD-83, struck a tree and an instrument landing system (ILS), but landed safety. All 78 people on board survived with 1 injury. The aircraft was later repaired and returned to service.
- On October 19, 1996, Delta Air Lines Flight 554, an MD-88, struck the approach lighting system while landing and skidded off the runway. All 63 people on board survived with 5 injured. The aircraft was later repaired and returned to service.
- On March 15, 1999, Korean Air Flight 1533, an MD-83 (HL7570), overshot runway 10 during landing at Pohang Airport. All 156 passengers and crew members survived, but the aircraft was written off.
- On March 16, 2007, Kish Air MD-82 (LZ-LDD) leased from Bulgarian Air Charter was damaged beyond repair in a hard landing accident at Kish Island Airport. There were no fatalities.
- On January 24, 2012, Swiftair Flight 94, an MD-83 (EC-JJS), suffered a wingtip strike while landing at Kandahar Airport, Afghanistan. Although there were no injuries to the 92 passengers and crew on board, the starboard wing sustained a broken main spar, and the aircraft was damaged beyond economic repair. It was consequently scrapped at Kandahar.
- On March 5, 2015, Delta Air Lines Flight 1086, an MD-88 (N909DL), skidded off the runway on landing at LaGuardia Airport, New York in snowy weather, suffering severe damage. A few minor injuries occurred during evacuation via the emergency chutes. Investigators from the National Transportation Safety Board were reportedly focusing on the aircraft's braking system and rudder.
- On March 8, 2017, Ameristar Charters Flight 9363, MD-83 (N786TW), overran the end of runway 23L at Willow Run Airport in Ypsilanti, Michigan, after rejecting a takeoff at very high speed due to a jammed elevator which could not be detected prior to the attempted takeoff. Only one injury occurred among the 116 on board, but the aircraft's belly and wings were substantially damaged after its landing gear collapsed during the overrun, and it was eventually written off.
- On June 14, 2018, Bravo Airways Flight 4406, an MD-83 (UR-CPR), slid off the runway on landing at Igor Sikorsky International Airport following an unstable approach; all 176 on board survived.
- On January 27, 2020, Caspian Airlines Flight 6936, an MD-83, overran the end of the Mahshahr Airport's runway 13 with 144 people on board. There were two injuries; the aircraft received substantial damage.
- On October 19, 2021, an MD-87, registration N987AK, crashed on take-off from Houston Executive Airport. All 21 people on board survived but the aircraft was destroyed by a post-crash fire. During examination of the intact tail section, it was found that both left and right elevators were jammed in a trailing edge down position. The aircraft was chartered to fly the passengers to Boston for a Astros baseball game.
- On June 21, 2022, RED Air Flight 203, an MD-82 (reg. HI1064), suffered a landing gear collapse and runway excursion upon landing at Miami International Airport, causing the right wing to catch fire. There were 4 minor injuries among the 140 passengers and crew, and the aircraft was written off.
- On February 9, 2024, an MD-82, registration 5Y-AXL and owned by African Express Airways, sustained substantial damage when it was involved in an accident at Malakal Airport, South Sudan. There were no injuries but the aircraft was written off. It received further damage on March 31, 2024, when it was hit by Safe Air's Boeing 727-2Q9F, which overran the runway during an emergency landing.

== Aircraft on display ==
- N900DE (cn 53372) – MD-88 preserved as a forward fuselage and cockpit section section at the Delta Flight Museum in Atlanta, Georgia. It was the first factory-built MD-88 delivered to Delta Air Lines in 1987 and later operated the airline's final scheduled MD-88 passenger flight before retirement in 2020. Due to space constraints, the museum ultimately decided to preserve only its cockpit section.
- N813ME (cn 48007) – MD-81 preserved as a 60-foot forward fuselage section at Sport Flyers Airport in Brookshire, Texas. It was converted into a private residence in 2011 alongside DC-9 (N79XS).
- N259AA (cn 49289) – MD-82 on display at the Tulsa Air and Space Museum in Tulsa, Oklahoma The cabin has been converted into a movie theater to become the "MD-80 Discovery Center".
- N292AA (cn 49304) – MD-82 is on static display at the Carolina Children's Museum in Carolina, Puerto Rico.
- N491AA (cn 49684) – MD-82 owned by Oklahoma State University and located at the Stillwater Regional Airport in Stillwater, Oklahoma. It is used by the university's School of Mechanical and Aerospace Engineering as part of its education programs.
- N948TW (cn 49575) is an MD-83 preserved by the Tristar Experience organization at Charles B. Wheeler Downtown Airport in Kansas City, Missouri. It is displayed as it appeared in service with Trans World Airlines in a special reversed-color "Wings of Pride" livery in the 1990s.
- I-SMEL (cn 49247) – a former Meridiana MD-82 is displayed at the Volandia Park and Flight Museum in Milan.
- LV-WFL (cn 48025) – a former Austral Líneas Aéreas MD-81 on display at the Museo Nacional de Aeronáutica in Morón, Buenos Aires.

== Specifications ==
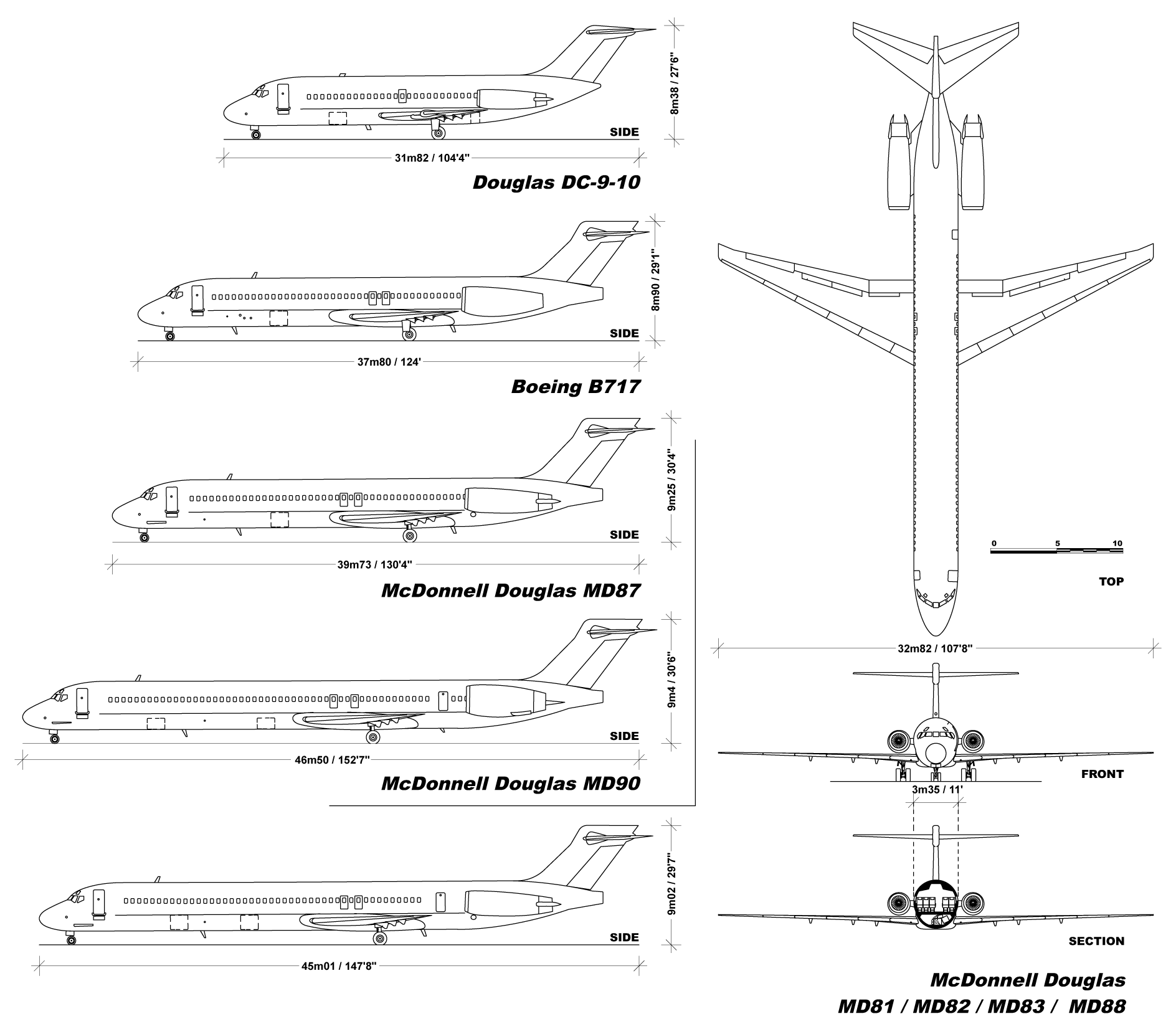
Comparison of DC-9, Boeing 717 and different MD-80 versions

Airplane characteristics
Variant	MD-81/82/83/88	MD-87
Cockpit crew	Two	
1-class seats	155Y @ 32–33 in (81–84 cm) (max 172)	130Y @ 31–33 in (79–84 cm) (max 139)
2-class seats	143: 12J @ 36 in (91 cm) + 131Y @ 31–34 in (79–86 cm)	117: 12J + 105Y
Length	147 ft 10 in (45.06 m)	130 ft 5 in (39.75 m)
Wing data	107 ft 8 in (32.82 m) span, 1,209 sq ft (112.3 m^{2}) area, aspect ratio: 9.6	
Tail height	29 ft 7 in (9.02 m)	30 ft 4 in (9.25 m)
Width	131.6 in / 334.3 cm fuselage, 122.5 in / 311.2 cm cabin	
Cargo	1,253 cu ft (35.5 m^{3}) -83/88: 1,013 cu ft (28.7 m^{3})	938 cu ft (26.6 m^{3})
Empty weight	77,900–79,700 lb (35,300–36,200 kg)	73,300 lb (33,200 kg)
Maximum take-off weight (MTOW)	-81: 140,000 lb (63,500 kg) -82: 149,500 lb (67,800 kg) -83/88: 160,000 lb (72,600 kg)	140,000–149,500 lb (63,500–67,800 kg)
Fuel capacity	5,850 US gal (22,100 L; 4,870 imp gal) -83/88: 7,000 US gal (26,000 L; 5,800 imp gal)	
Engines (×2)	Pratt & Whitney JT8D-200 series	
Thrust (×2)	18,500–21,000 lbf (82–93 kN)	
Long-range cruise	Mach 0.76 (448 kn; 830 km/h; 516 mph)	
High-speed cruise	Mach 0.8 (472 kn; 873 km/h; 543 mph)	
Range (Note: ISA, 200nm alt + 45 mn LRC reserves)	-81: 1,800 nmi (3,300 km; 2,100 mi) @ 137 pax -82: 2,050 nmi (3,800 km; 2,360 mi) @ 155 pax -83/88: 2,550 nmi (4,720 km; 2,930 mi) @ 155 pax	2,400–2,900 nmi (4,400–5,400 km; 2,800–3,300 mi)
Takeoff (Note: MTOW, sea level, ISA)	7,200–8,000 ft (2,200–2,400 m)	7,500 ft (2,300 m)

== See also ==
- Airstair

Related development

- McDonnell Douglas C-9
- McDonnell Douglas DC-9
- McDonnell Douglas MD-90
- Boeing 717
- Comac C909

Aircraft of comparable role, configuration, and era

- Airbus A320
- Boeing 737-400

Related lists

- List of jet airliners
- List of civil aircraft
- List of McDonnell Douglas MD-80 operators

== Sources ==
- Becher, Thomas. Douglas Twinjets, DC-9, MD-80, MD-90 and Boeing 717. Crowood Press, 2002. ISBN 1-86126-446-1.
- Michell, Simon. Jane's Civil and Military Aircraft Upgrades 1994–95 Coulsdon, UK: Jane's Information Group, 1994. ISBN 0-7106-1208-7.
- Taylor, John W. R. Jane's All The World's Aircraft 1982–83. London: Jane's Yearbooks, 1982. ISBN 0-7106-0748-2.
- Taylor, John W. R. Jane's All The World's Aircraft 1988–89. Coulsdon, UK: Jane's Defence Data, 1988. ISBN 0-7106-0867-5.
- Thisdell, Dan and Fafard, Antoine. "World Airliner Census". Flight International, Volume 190, No. 5550, August 9–15, 2016. pp. 20–43. ISSN 0015-3710
