= List of McDonnell Douglas MD-80 operators =

== Airline operators ==
The List of McDonnell Douglas MD-80 operators lists the current operators of the aircraft, and any of its variants. Originally popular with operators such as American Airlines and Delta Air Lines, by the 2020s it had been largely been relegated to scheduled airline service in Central and South America, Africa, and Iran, as well as charter, cargo, and aerial firefighting services. As of August, 2025, around 100 MD-80 aircraft (all variants) were in active service, with Mexican charter carrier Aeronaves TSM as the largest operator.

== Former operators ==
Airline	MD-81	MD-82	MD-83	MD-87	MD-88	Total
Alaska Airlines	15	29				44
American Airlines		270	108			378
Delta Air Lines					120	120
Hawaiian Airlines	7					7
Scandinavian Airlines	42	31	2	18		93
