= 1989 in aviation =

This is a list of aviation-related events from 1989.

== Events ==
- Lauda Air initiates in first long-haul service, offering flights from between Vienna, Austria, and Melbourne and Sydney, Australia.

=== January ===
- January 1 – Norway forms the Accident Investigation Board for Civil Aviation – the future Accident Investigation Board Norway – within its Ministry of Transport and Communications.
- January 4
  - Two United States Navy F-14 Tomcats of Fighter Squadron 32 (VF-32) aboard the aircraft carrier USS John F. Kennedy (CV-67) shoot down two Libyan Air Force Mikoyan-Gurevich MiG-23s (NATO reporting name "Flogger") off the coast of Libya using AIM-7 Sparrow and AIM-9 Sidewinder air-to-air missiles. They are the third and fourth of five kills scored by F-14s during the Tomcat's career in U.S. Navy service.
  - Two French television journalists are arrested for trying to plant fake bombs – each consisting of a package containing molding clay, an alarm clock, wires, and the message "Congratulations! You have found our phony bomb!" – aboard three airliners at John F. Kennedy International Airport in New York City bound for Paris, France, as a test of airport security, planning that their colleagues will film the arrival of the packages in Paris. The charges ultimately will be dropped in 1994.
- January 8 – Attempting to make an emergency landing at East Midlands Airport in Castle Donington in North West Leicestershire, England, British Midland Flight 092, a Boeing 737-4Y0 crashes just short of the runway on an embankment of the M1 motorway, killing 47 of the 126 people on board.

=== February ===
- February 8 – On approach to Santa Maria Airport in the Azores, Independent Air Flight 1851, a chartered Boeing 707-331B, crashes into Pico Alto on Santa Maria Island after a misunderstanding between its crew and air traffic control. All 144 people on board died.
- February 19 – Flying Tiger Line Flight 066, a Boeing 747-247F cargo aircraft, crashes near Kuala Lumpur, Malaysia, killing the entire crew of four.
- February 24 – A cargo door failure causes a piece of fuselage to detach from United Airlines Flight 811, a Boeing 747-122, over the Pacific Ocean near Honolulu, Hawaii. Nine people are sucked from the plane by explosive decompression to their deaths. Another 38 people are injured. The plane lands safely at Honolulu International Airport.

=== March ===
- March 10 – Unable to clear trees beyond the end of the runway due to ice and snow on its wings, Air Ontario Flight 1363, a Fokker F28-1000 Friendship, crashes 15 seconds after takeoff from Dryden Regional Airport in Dryden, Ontario, Canada, killing 24 of the 69 people on board and injuring all 45 survivors.
- March 22 – An Antonov An-225 Mriya sets a total of 106 world and class records during a 3-hour, 30-minute flight. Its total weight at take-off is 508,200 kg (1,129,370 lb).
- March 26 – The airline Binter Canarias, a subsidiary of Iberia, begins flight operations.

=== April ===
- Vietnam Airlines is established as a state-owned enterprise of the Government of Vietnam. It becomes the national airline.
- April 1 – Burma Airways is renamed Myanma Airways. It eventually will become Myanmar National Airlines.
- April 12 – A British Airways Concorde loses a large piece of its rudder on a flight between Christchurch, New Zealand, and Sydney, Australia. The plane makes a safe landing at Sydney Airport and the plane is repaired.
- April 21 – U.S. Air Force Lockheed SR-71A Blackbird 61–7974 Item 2025, outbound on an operational sortie from Kadena Air Base, Okinawa, suffers an engine explosion and total hydraulic failure. The crew eject safely. It is the final Blackbird loss before the type is withdrawn from service.

=== May ===
- May 13 – An Antonov An-225 Mriya carries the Soviet Buran orbiter for the first time.
- May 20 – A Cessna 208 Caravan flying from Tingo María, in the Peruvian Amazonian highlands, on a DEA coca eradication mission taking place in the context of Operation Snowcap, crashed into Mount Huacranacro, 100 km (62.5 mls) east of Huaral. The nine occupants, six Americans and three Peruvians, were killed. The plane may have suffered an engine failure.
- May 23 – First flight of the second and last Grumman X-29, American experimental aircraft that tested a forward-swept wing, canard control surfaces, and other novel aircraft technologies.
- May 26 – Eurofly is founded. It will begin flight operations in February 1990.

=== June ===
- June 2 – Two Israeli Air Force F-15C Eagles shoot down two Syrian MiG-29s (NATO reporting name "Fulcrum").
- June 7 – With its crew knowingly attempting to land using an inappropriate navigation signal and ignoring alarms warning them of an impending crash, Surinam Airways Flight 764, a McDonnell Douglas DC-8 Super 62, crashes on approach to Paramaribo-Zanderij International Airport at Paramaribo, Suriname, killing 176 of the 187 people on board and injuring all 11 survivors.
- June 8 – A Soviet Air Force Mikoyan MiG-29 suffers a birdstrike during a display at the Paris Air Show. Pilot Anatoli Kvochur manages to prevent the plane from injuring anyone, and saves himself by ejecting at only 400 feet (122 m).
- June 17 – American astronaut S. David Griggs is killed when the vintage World War II-era North American AT-6D training aircraft (registration N3931S) he is piloting crashes at Earle, Arkansas.
- June 23 – Trump Airlines begins operations.
- June 26 – East Germany's national airline, Interflug, takes delivery of its first Western-built airliner, an Airbus A310.

=== July ===
- July 4 – Crash of an unmanned MiG-23 in Kortrijk, Belgium. The pilot had believed he was experiencing an engine failure shortly after take-off from the Soviet airbase near Kołobrzeg, Poland and had ejected, while the aircraft continued on autopilot for 900 km (559 miles), until running out of fuel. One 18-year-old teenager on the ground was killed in the crash.
- July 16 – European air traffic is halted due to industrial action by French air traffic controllers.
- July 19 – United Airlines Flight 232, a Douglas DC-10, suffers decompression in and catastrophic failure of its tail-mounted engine, knocking out all its flight controls. In what is considered a prime example of successful crew resource management, the plane's crew manages to use engine throttles to fly the plane to Sioux City, Iowa, where it crashes on landing. Although 112 of the people on board die, the crew is credited with saving the other 184 by coaxing the aircraft to Sioux City.

=== August ===
- 3 August 1989: an Olympic Aviation Short 330, operating as Olympic Aviation Flight 545, crashed on a hillside in Samos island, Greece, while attempting a landing approach in thick fog. All 3 crew members and 31 passengers were killed.
- August 5 – Piedmont Airlines merges into USAir.
- August 7
  - Mickey Leland, a member of the United States House of Representatives representing Texas's 18th Congressional District, and all of the other 15 people on board are killed when a de Havilland DHC-6 Twin Otter (registration ET-AIL) crashes into a mountain near Gambela, Ethiopia, while flying at low altitude in thunderstorms during a refugee relief inspection flight.
  - Flying Tiger Line merges into Federal Express.
- August 9 – L'Express Airlines begins operations, offering 45 weekly flights to seven Louisiana cities: Alexandria, Baton Rouge, Lafayette, Lake Charles, Monroe, New Orleans, and Shreveport.
- August 13 – Larkin I. Smith, a member of the U.S. House of Representatives representing Mississippi's 5th Congressional District, and his pilot are killed when their Cessna 177 Cardinal crashes in a forest near Janice, Mississippi, while flying in hazy weather. Rescuers must bulldoze their way through the forest to reach the plane's wreckage, delaying the recovery of the bodies until the following day.
- August 18 – A Qantas Boeing 747, the Spirit of Australia, flies non-stop from London to Sydney, setting a world record for a four engine jet, after having flown 11,000 miles in 20 hours.
- August 21 – Rare Bear, a highly modified Grumman F8F Bearcat, sets a new piston-engined speed record of 528.33 mph (850.77 km/h).
- August 22 – Soviet aeronautical engineer and founder of the Yakovlev Design Bureau Alexander Yakovlev dies, aged 84.
- August 23 – 1989 Australian pilots' dispute: All of Australia's 1,645 domestic airline pilots resign over an airline's move to dismiss and sue them over a wage dispute.

=== September ===
- September 3 – The pilots of Varig Flight 254, a Boeing 737-241 with 54 people on board, enter an incorrect heading into the flight computer before taking off from Marabá, Brazil, for Belém, Brazil. By the time they discover their error, they have too little fuel to reach an airport; they belly-land in the Amazon jungle near São José do Xingu, Brazil, killing 13 passengers. Thirty-four of the 41 survivors are injured, many seriously; they are not rescued for two days.
- September 8 – Vibration from an auxiliary power unit aboard Partnair Flight 394, a Convair CV-580 on a charter flight, spreads to the tail section, causing the rudder to jam to the left. The plane dives from 22,000 feet (6,706 m) into the North Sea off Hirtshals, Denmark, disintegrating during the dive and killing all 55 people on board.
- September 19 – A bomb explodes in the cargo hold of UTA Flight 772, a McDonnell Douglas DC-10-30, over the Sahara Desert. The DC-10 breaks up in mid-air and crashes near Bilma and Ténéré in Niger, killing all 170 people on board. Responsibility for the bombing is never determined.
- September 20 – USAir Flight 5050, a Boeing 737-401 with 63 people on board, aborts its takeoff in low visibility on a wet runway at LaGuardia Airport in New York City and slides off the end of the runway into Bowery Bay, killing two people and injuring 21.

=== October ===
- Hainan Province Airlines – the future Hainan Airlines – is founded. It will begin flight operations in May 1993.
- October 11 – A Syrian Arab Air Force pilot defects to Israel, landing his MiG-23MLD at Megiddo Airport. The Israeli Air Force later flies the MiG-23MLD at its Flight Test Center.
- October 21 – TAN-SAHSA Flight 414, a Boeing 727-200, crashes into a hill near Toncontin International Airport in Tegucigalpa Honduras, while on approach to landing there, killing 127 of the 146 people on board and injuring all 19 survivors.
- October 26 – China Airlines Flight 204, a Boeing 737-209, crashes into a mountain after takeoff from Hualien Airport on Taiwan, killing all 54 people on board.
- October 28 – Aloha Island Air Flight 1712, a de Havilland Canada DHC-6 Twin Otter 300 registered as N707PV, crashed into a mountain at night killing all 20 occupants on board.

=== November ===
- November 6 – Braniff Inc.—the second airline to use the Braniff name, operating under bankruptcy protection since late September 1989—ends scheduled commercial flights and lays off most employees.
- November 8 – A McDonnell Douglas KC-10A Extender tanker aircraft refuels a Northrop Grumman B-2 Spirit bomber in the air. It is the first aerial refueling of a B-2.
- November 12 – California Polytechnic State University flies the first human-powered helicopter.
- November 15 – Midway Airlines begins operating its second hub, located at Philadelphia International Airport in Philadelphia, Pennsylvania.
- November 25 - A Korean Air Fokker F28-4000 crashed on takeoff due to engine failure caused by icing, killing 1 passenger.
- November 27 – Five minutes after takeoff from El Dorado International Airport in Bogotá, Colombia. a bomb planted by the Medellin drug cartel in an attempt to assassinate Colombian presidential candidate César Gaviria Trujillo explodes aboard Avianca Flight 203, a Boeing 727, while it is over Soacha, Colombia. All 107 people on board die in the resulting crash, as do three people on the ground. Gaviria is not on the plane.

=== December ===
- December 10 – California Polytechnic State University's Da Vinci III makes the first flight by a human-powered helicopter, remaining airborne for 7.1 seconds and reaching an altitude of 20 cm (8 inches).
- December 15
  - All four engines of a KLM Boeing 747-400 operating KLM Flight 867 with 245 people on board, shut down when the plane flies through a volcanic ash cloud from Mount Redoubt during its descent to Anchorage International Airport. After descending more than 14,000 feet (4,267 m) without power, the crew successfully restart the engines and the plane lands safely. This incident is similar to British Airways Flight 9 that occurred in 1982.
  - Atlantic Coast Airlines begins flight operations. It operates as United Express for United Airlines.
- December 20 – The United States invasion of Panama, Operation Just Cause, begins with over 300 U.S. military aircraft participating. The U.S. Air Force's F-117A Nighthawk stealth fighter and the U.S. Army's AH-64 Apache attack helicopter make their combat debuts. One of the first U.S. operations is an air assault by the 1st Battalion (Airborne) of the U.S. Army's 508th Parachute Infantry Regiment which secures Fort Amador.
- December 24 – Major combat operations in Operation Just Cause conclude.
- December 26 – United Express Flight 2415, a BAe Jetstream 31 operated by North Pacific Airlines, crashes on approach to Tri-Cities Airport at Pasco, Washington, in the United States, killing all six people on board.
- December 30 – Air Dolomiti is founded. Flight operations begin in January 1991.
- December 31 – U.S. airlines complete their worst ever recorded year for baggage handling: nearly eight suitcases per 1,000 passengers are reported lost, damaged, or misdirected during 1989.

== First flights ==
=== January ===
- January 2 – Tupolev Tu-204 CCCP-64001
- January 11 – AASI Jetcruzer 450 N5369M
- January 12 - Aerostar AG-6 YR-BGX
- January 25 – MAC Mamba

=== March ===
- March 19 – Bell Boeing V-22 Osprey 163911

=== April ===
- April 30 – SOCATA TB 31 Oméga
- April - ENAER Ñamcú

=== May ===
- May 28 – AIDC Ching-Kuo
- May 29 – Swearingen SA-32T Turbo Trainer

=== June ===
- June 13 – General Avia F.22

=== July ===
- July 17 – B-2 Spirit

=== October ===
- October 7 – Enstrom 480

=== November ===
- Westland Battlefield Lynx, later the Westland Lynx AH.9

=== December ===
- December 26 – NAMC N-5A
- December 31 – Sukhoi Su-30 (NATO reporting name "Flanker-C")

== Entered service ==
- February 9 – Boeing 747-400 with Northwest Airlines
- October 27 – ATR-72 with Karair

== Deadliest crash ==
The deadliest crash of this year was Surinam Airways Flight 764, a McDonnell Douglas DC-8 which crashed during approach to Paramaribo, Suriname, on 7 June killing 176 of the 187 people aboard.
