= Air Charter Scotland =

British business jet and regional airline

Air Charter Scotland Limited
IATA	ICAO	Call sign
3A	EDC	SALTIRE
- Founded: 2003
- Operating bases: Glasgow Airport; Luton Airport; Malta International Airport; Wick Airport
- Fleet size: 9
- Destinations: Private Charter & 1 Scheduled
- Headquarters: East Kilbride, Scotland, UK
- Key people: George McFarlane (Chairman); Derek Thomson (COO)
- Website: aircharterscotland.com

Air Charter Scotland Limited is a British private charter and regional airline headquartered in East Kilbride, Scotland. Established in 2003, the company traditionally specialised in business jet management and global executive charter services. In January 2026, it expanded into scheduled domestic commercial operations after being awarded a Public Service Obligation (PSO) contract by The Highland Council.

== History ==
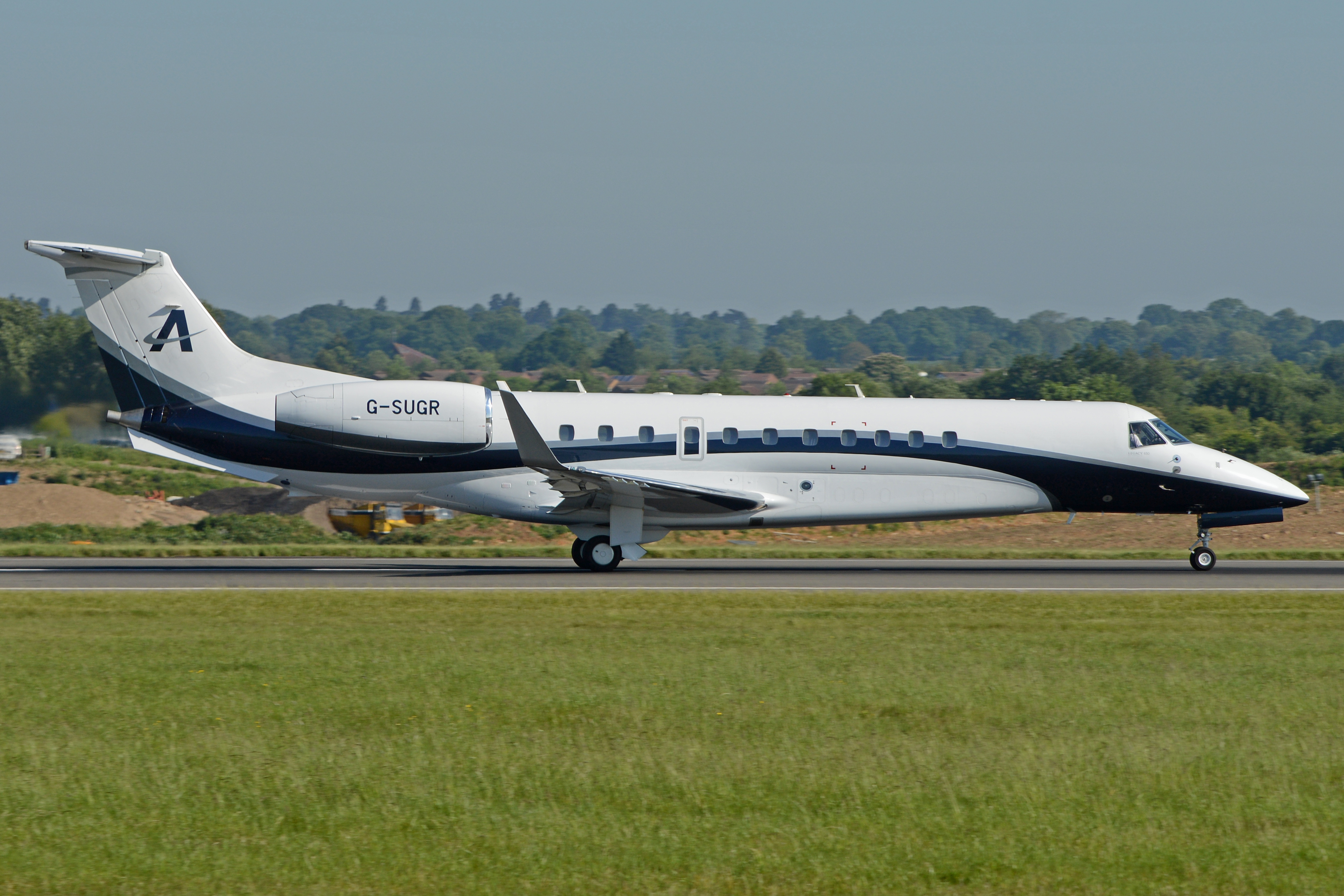
Embraer Legacy 650 at Luton Airport, 2017

Air Charter Scotland was acquired by George McFarlane in 2003. Over two decades, it evolved from a small operator of piston-twin aircraft into a global executive charter firm managing a fleet of long-range heavy jets. In 2020, the company launched a Maltese subsidiary, Air Charter Scotland Europe (ICAO: SCO), to facilitate continued access to the European market following Brexit.

Following the collapse of Eastern Airways in October 2025, the vital "lifeline" air link between Wick and Aberdeen was suspended. In December 2025, Air Charter Scotland was selected as the new operator for the Public Service Obligation (PSO) route.

Scheduled operations commenced on 14 January 2026. Due to initial regulatory requirements, the service began using a Beechcraft King Air 200 operated by DragonFly Executive Air Charter, with plans to transition to an 18-seat Jetstream 32 wet-leased from AIS Airlines by March 2026. The airline has stated its intention to add the Jetstream type to its own AOC to fully integrate the scheduled regional division.

== Services ==
The airline operates in three distinct sectors:

- Executive charter: Ad-hoc private jet travel for corporate and VIP clients.
- Aircraft management: Turnkey management solutions for private aircraft owners.
- Scheduled regional: A daily PSO service connecting Wick, Caithness to Scotland's regional hubs in Aberdeen & Glasgow

== Fleet ==
As of January 2026, Air Charter Scotland's fleet includes a mix of executive jets and regional turboprops:

Aircraft	In service	Orders	Notes
Embraer Legacy 500	1	—	
Embraer Legacy 650	1	—	
Bombardier Challenger 350	2	—	Operated by Maltese subsidiary Air Charter Scotland Europe
Cessna Citation CJ4	1	—	
Cessna Citation Latitude	1	—	
Cessna Citation Excel	2	—	Operated by Maltese subsidiary Air Charter Scotland Europe
Jetstream 32	1	—	Operated by AIS Airlines
Total	9	—	
