= Presidential Airways (scheduled) =

American scheduled airline from 1985 to 1989

IATA	ICAO	Call sign
XV	PXV	WASHINGTON EAGLE
- Founded: October 10, 1985; 40 years ago
- Ceased operations: December 5, 1989; 36 years ago
- Hubs: Washington Dulles International Airport
- Fleet size: 23
- Headquarters: Herndon, Virginia, U.S.
- Key people: Harold J. Pareti (founder, president, CEO)

Presidential Airways (IATA: XV, ICAO: PXV, call sign: Washington Eagle) was an airline with its headquarters on the grounds of Washington Dulles International Airport in Northern Virginia. It was founded in 1985 by Harold J. (Hap) Pareti, formerly an officer at People Express Airlines, known as PEOPLExpress a low-cost carrier, with Boeing 737-200 service from Washington Dulles to Boston Logan in Massachusetts commencing October 10 of that year. A small fleet of B737-200 jetliners were initially operated by the airline.

== History ==
Presidential later on expanded to a number of destinations, merging with the original Colgan Air in 1986 and adding the British Aerospace BAe 146-200 jetliner and orders for the de Havilland Canada DHC-8-300 Dash 8 turboprop to its fleet (only two of the DHC-8-300s were ever received). It was unable to sustain its expansion, however, and subsequently became a regional Continental Express feeder for Continental Airlines as well as operating Pan Am Express service for Pan Am in 1987 and then as a regional United Express feeder for United Airlines in 1988 via respective code sharing agreements with these major air carriers.

In early 1989, Presidential attempted to capitalize on the "hub fever" then prevalent in the southeastern United States by trying to raise money from investors in Birmingham, Alabama with the stated intent of operating a new mini-hub at the Birmingham-Shuttlesworth International Airport (BHM). However, Presidential's shaky financial condition and eventual bankruptcy assured that nothing ever came of it. Burdened with debt from its changes of the business plan, Presidential filed for Chapter 11 bankruptcy on October 26, 1989. It ended operations on December 5, 1989 and its assets subsequently liquidated. Shortly before that time, employees received a pay cut for two pay periods in an attempt to improve cash flow at the airline.

At one point just before its demise, Presidential operated an odd mix of fleet types: twelve British Aerospace BAe Jetstream 31 and Jetstream 32 commuter turboprops (some of which were contracted), two early model Beechcraft 1900 commuter turboprops, eight BAe 146 jets and one aging Boeing 737. The BAe Jetstream turboprops were operated as United Express flights as were the Dash 8 propjets with the airline also previously operating the BAe 146 in United Express operations as well according to the Official Airline Guide (OAG). The 737 primarily flew roundtrip service between Washington Dulles (IAD) and MacArthur-Islip (ISP) on Long Island, New York. In 1988, the 737 was used as the campaign plane for first Republican Senator Robert Dole and then Massachusetts Governor and Democratic nominee for president, Michael Dukakis. Reporters assigned to Dukakis nicknamed the plane "The Sky Pig" because it was so slow.

Of these aircraft, the Beechcraft 1900s were the first to go as they were sold to pay bills. There was also an odd mix of paint schemes. Some Jetstream turboprops were painted in the red, white and blue Presidential scheme while others featured the United Express livery featuring a white fuselage with colored stripes. The BAe Jetstream aircraft contracted from Metro Airlines were branded in an Eastern Airlines mainline paint scheme (and flown by pilots of Metro Airlines which were assigned to the Eastern Metro Express division). At least one BAe 146 jet was painted in Continental Express colors as well.

== Fleet ==
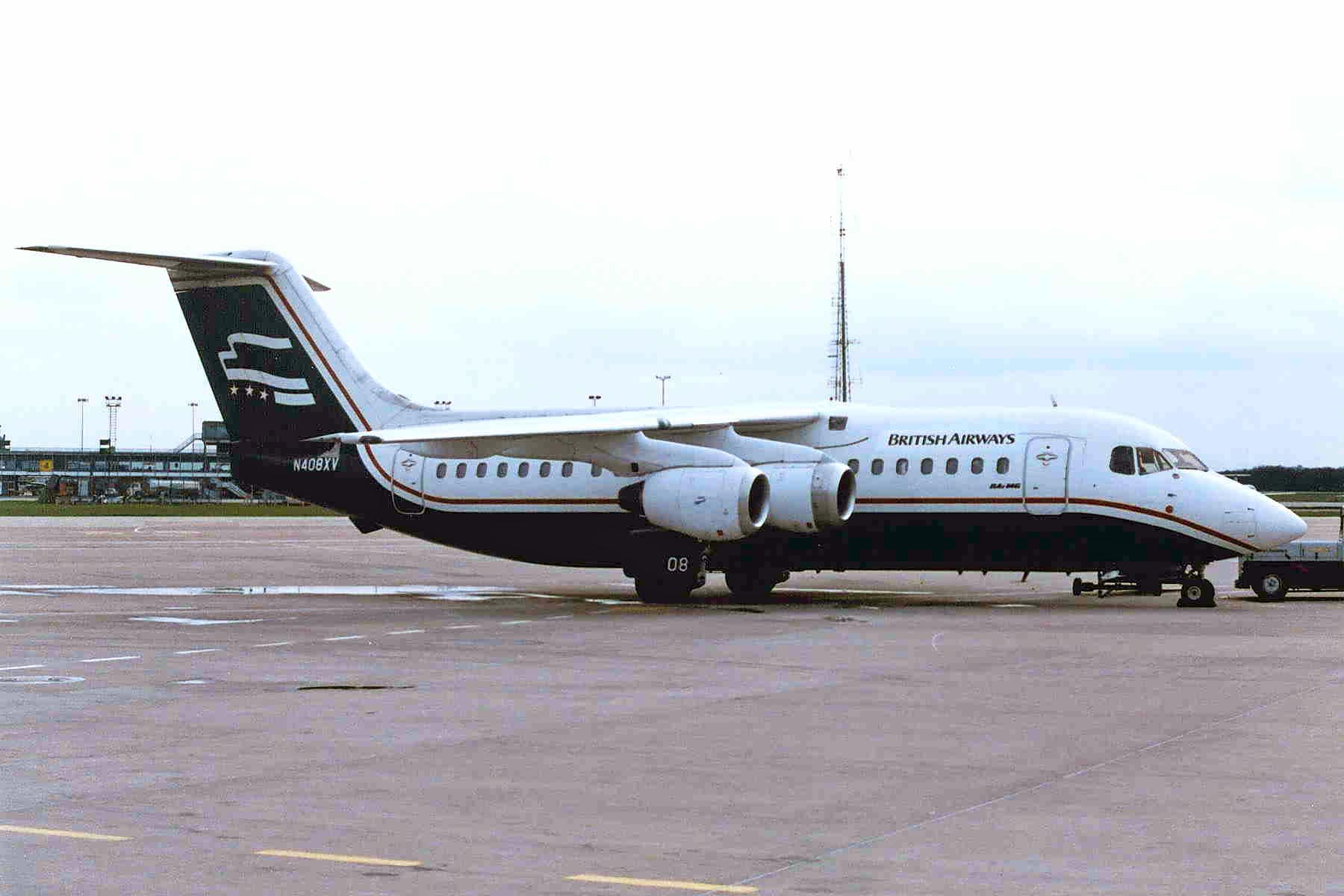
Presidential Airways BAe 146-200

- Beechcraft 1900C
- Boeing 737-100
- Boeing 737-200
- British Aerospace BAe 146-200
- British Aerospace BAe Jetstream 31
- British Aerospace BAe Jetstream 32
- de Havilland Canada DHC-8-300 Dash 8

== Destinations ==
The following destination information is taken from the Presidential Airways system timetable dated July 3, 1986. Presidential was still operating as an independent air carrier at this time and was thus not yet providing codeshare flight services for Continental Airlines, Pan Am or United Airlines. Virtually all of these destinations were served on a nonstop basis with jet aircraft from the airline's hub located at Washington Dulles International Airport (IAD).

- Akron-Canton, OH (CAK)
- Allentown, PA (ABE)
- Atlanta, GA (ATL)
- Birmingham, AL (BHM)
- Boston, MA (BOS)
- Chattanooga, TN (CHA)
- Cincinnati, OH (CVG)
- Cleveland, OH (CLE)
- Daytona Beach, FL (DAB)
- Detroit, MI (DTW)
- Elmira, NY (ELM)
- Hartford, CT (BDL)
- Huntsville, AL (HSV)
- Islip, NY (ISP)
- Indianapolis, IN (IND)
- Knoxville, TN (TYS)
- Melbourne, FL (MLB)
- Miami, FL (MIA)
- Montreal, Quebec, Canada - Mirabel International Airport (YMX) - Only international destination.
- New York City, NY - LaGuardia Airport (LGA)
- Portland, ME (PWM)
- Providence, RI (PVD)
- Sarasota, FL (SRQ)
- Savannah, GA (SAV)
- Washington, D.C. - Dulles International Airport (IAD) - Hub
- West Palm Beach, FL (PBI)

== See also ==
- List of defunct airlines of the United States
