= United Express =

Regional airline brand of the United States

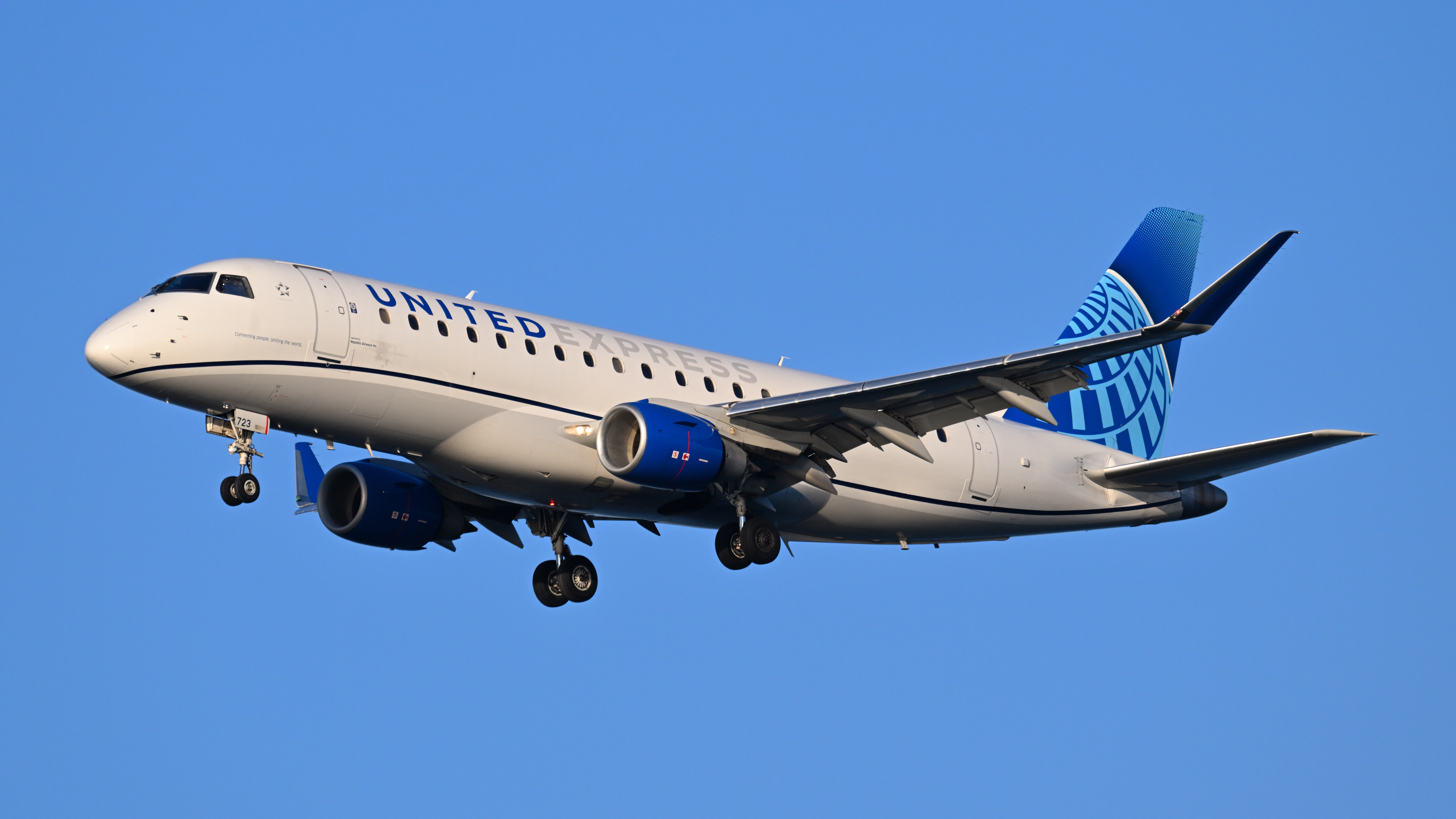
- Embraer 175 operated by Republic Airways
- Founded: 1985; 41 years ago
- Hubs: Chicago–O'Hare; Denver; Houston–Intercontinental; Los Angeles; Newark; San Francisco; Washington–Dulles
- Frequent-flyer program: MileagePlus
- Alliance: Star Alliance (affiliate)
- Fleet size: 439
- Parent company: United Airlines Holdings
- Headquarters: Chicago, Illinois
- Website: united.com

United Express is a regional airline network that supports United Airlines operations, primarily by serving smaller cities and connecting traffic to United's main hubs. Representing six percent of United's total capacity for 2024, United Express operates through partnerships with regional carriers, including CommuteAir, GoJet Airlines, Mesa Airlines, Republic Airways, and SkyWest Airlines. These carriers operate under capacity purchase agreements, wherein United contracts for flight services, pays fixed and performance-based fees, and covers additional costs, like fuel and landing fees. The regional carriers operate United-branded flights following schedules set by the airline, while United manages pricing, revenue, and loyalty programs for passengers.

== Airlines and fleet ==
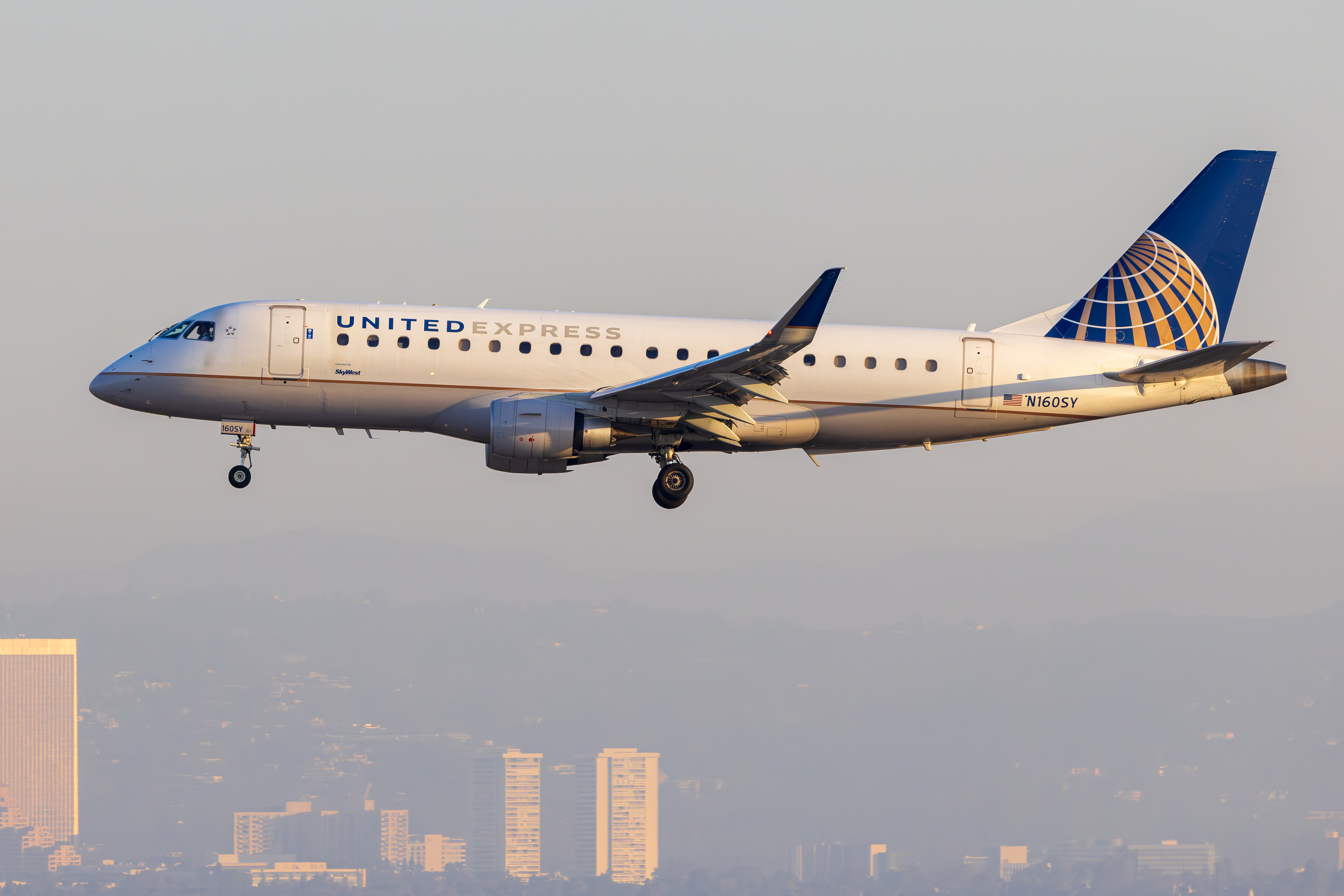
A SkyWest Airlines Embraer 175 in United Express livery landing at Los Angeles International Airport in 2023

As of September 2026, the combined United Express-branded fleet consists of the following regional jet aircraft:

United Express fleet
Airline	Aircraft	In fleet	Orders	Passengers				Notes
Airline	Aircraft	In fleet	Orders	F	Y+	Y	Total	Notes
CommuteAir	Embraer ERJ 145	59	—	—	6	44	50	
GoJet Airlines	Bombardier CRJ550	58	—	10	20	20	50	
Mesa Airlines	Embraer 175	28	—	12	32	26	70	
Mesa Airlines	Embraer 175	32	—	12	16	48	76	
Republic Airways	Embraer 175	66	—	12	16	48	76	
SkyWest Airlines	Bombardier CRJ200	30	—	—	—	50	50	
SkyWest Airlines	Bombardier CRJ450	—	50	7	16	18	41	Converted CRJ200s entering service in Fall 2026 through 2028.
SkyWest Airlines	Bombardier CRJ550	42	8	10	20	20	50	
SkyWest Airlines	Embraer 175	65	5	12	32	26	70	
SkyWest Airlines	Embraer 175	59	—	12	16	48	76	
Total		439	63					

In addition to the aircraft in the table above, United owned the following regional aircraft as of December 31, 2025: 29 Embraer ERJ 145 aircraft that are temporarily out of service, and 2 Bombardier CRJ700 awaiting conversion to CRJ550.

== History ==
1985–1993 logo

1993–1997 logo

1997–2010 logo

2010–present logo

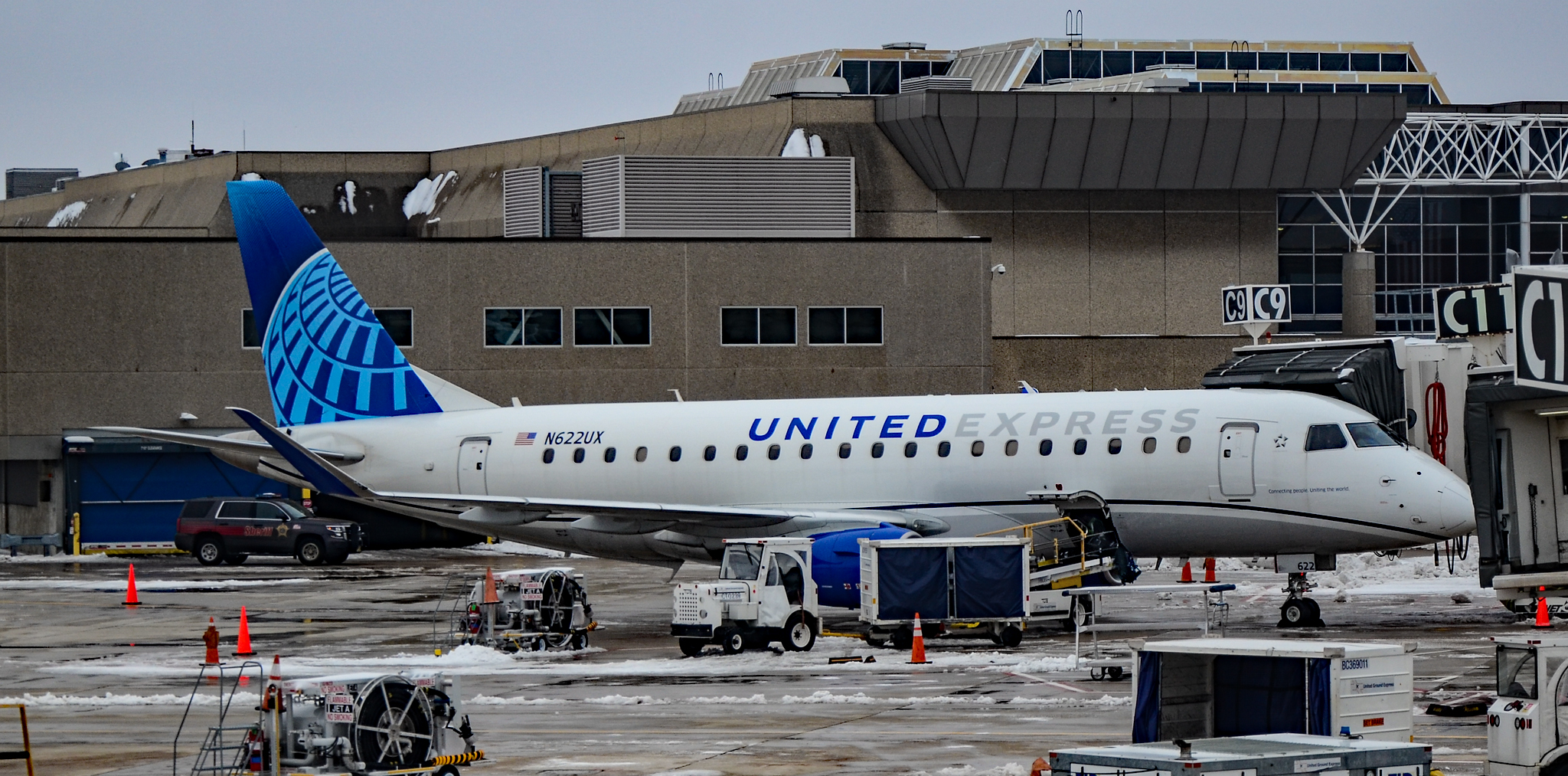
United Express Embraer 175 painted in the current livery at Gerald R. Ford International Airport in January 2021

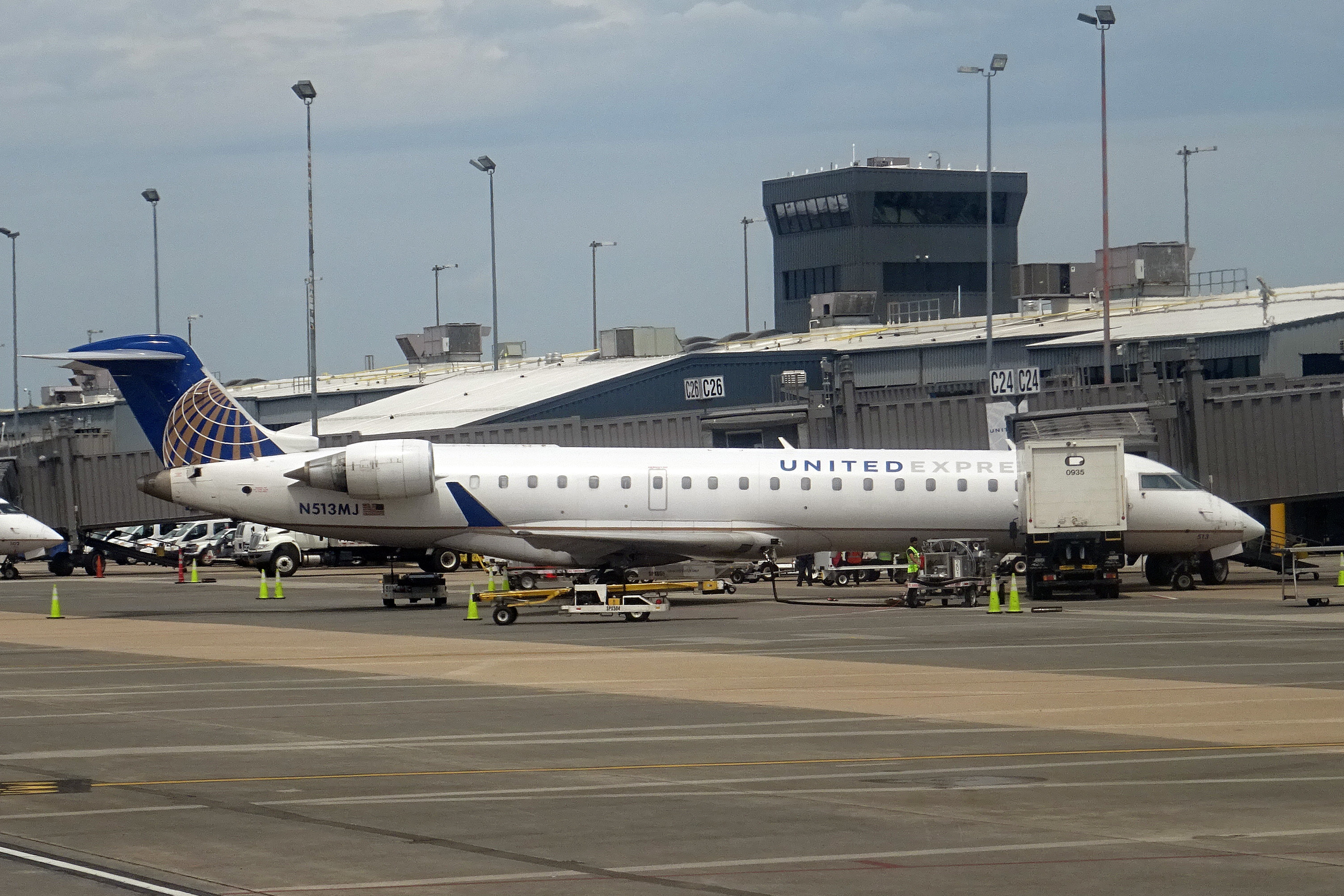
United Express CRJ700 at Washington Dulles International Airport in June 2018

Major airlines in the United States had long maintained relationships with regional carriers which fed passengers from small markets to larger cities. The Airline Deregulation Act of 1978 spurred industry consolidation, and as the hub system became more pronounced, airlines formalized these relationships through code sharing, co-branding and listing regional partners' flights in computer reservations systems.

On May 1, 1985, United formally partnered with Air Wisconsin, Horizon Air, and WestAir as United Express, feeding its hubs at Chicago–O'Hare, Seattle/Tacoma, and San Francisco, respectively. Aspen Airways joined in 1986 the hub at Denver–Stapleton. Horizon Air was bought by Alaska Airlines in 1987 at which time Horizon's contract with United was cancelled and a new carrier, North Pacific Airlines (NPA), was established by WestAir to service the Seattle hub as well as hubs at Portland, Spokane, and Boise. Aspen was dismantled in 1990 being sold to Air Wisconsin and Mesa Airlines. NPA was merged into its parent, WestAir, in 1991. San Juan Airlines of Seattle and SouthCentral Air of Anchorage, Alaska, also operated as United Express from 1987 through 1989.

In 1988, Presidential Airways became a United Express carrier for United's new hub at Washington–Dulles, but quickly floundered. In response, WestAir formed an eastern division to serve Dulles. WestAir itself experienced turmoil; in 1991 it spun off the new division into an independent company, Atlantic Coast Airlines (ACA), which years later would go on to become Independence Air.

In 1990, Mesa Airlines took over all of the United Express routes from Denver formerly operated by Aspen Airways except the Denver to Aspen route which went to Air Wisconsin. Mesa also added a number of new routes from Denver as well. In 1992 Mesa created a new division called California Pacific Airlines to begin new United Express service from the Los Angeles hub. In 1995, Mesa took over all United Express routes at the Seattle and Portland hubs formerly operated by WestAir. Mesa Airlines contract operating as United Express was cancelled in 1998 at which time Air Wisconsin and Great Lakes Airlines took over the Denver routes while SkyWest took over the Los Angeles, Seattle, and Portland routes.

In 1992, Great Lakes Airlines became a United Express partner, followed by Trans States Airlines the following year. In 1997, as United officially designated Los Angeles one of its hubs, SkyWest Airlines became a United Express partner as well. Great Lakes left the United Express system in early 2002, although it continued to do codeshare flights until they ceased operations in 2018.

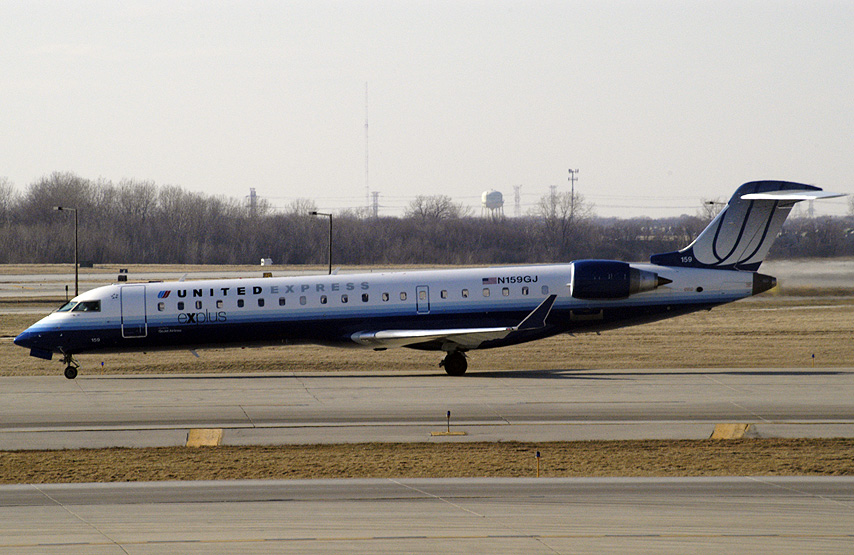
United Express Bombardier CRJ700 painted in the 2004–2010 livery at Chicago O'Hare International Airport in February 2006

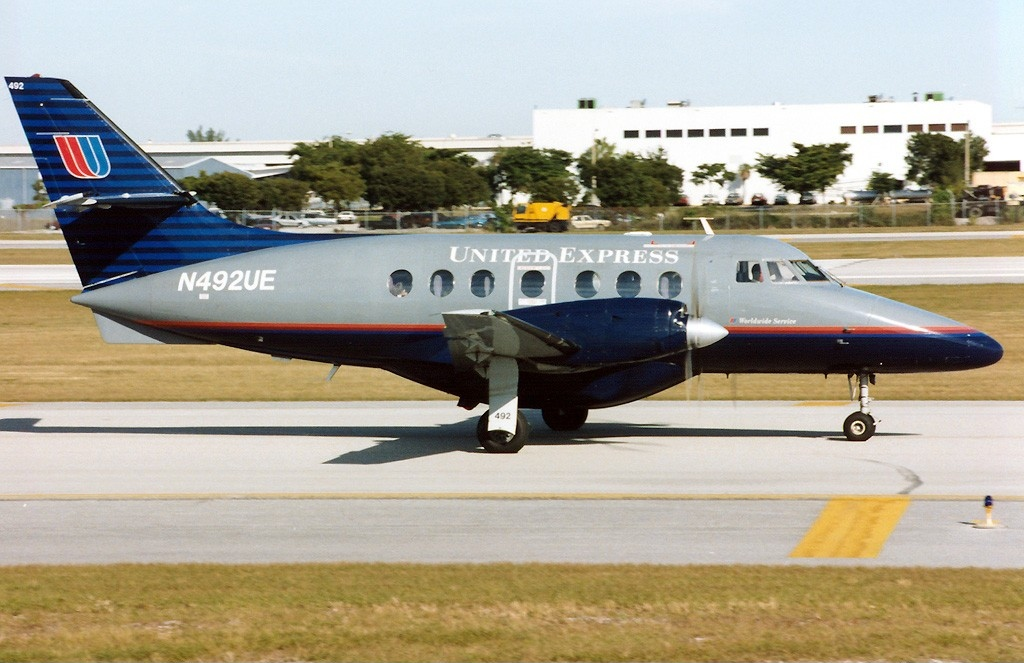
United Express Jetstream 31 painted in the 1993–2004 livery photographed at Fort Lauderdale–Hollywood International Airport in December 1993

In 1993, Trans States Airlines started United Feeder Service (UFS), to operate British Aerospace BAe ATP aircraft for United Airlines. The aircraft, originally owned by Air Wisconsin, were transferred and subsequently owned by United. UFS operated routes to Chicago–O'Hare from close markets in the U.S. Upper Midwest. UFS was eliminated from the United Express carrier network in 1999 and disappeared.

When United declared for Chapter 11 reorganization in 2002, it pressured its regional partners for reduced fees. In 2004, ACA canceled its contract and attempted to reinvent itself as low-cost carrier called Independence Air, but ceased operations only 18 months later. The next year, Air Wisconsin unsuccessfully bid to retain its flying contract, though it did retain some ground-handling United Express operations. To compensate, United initiated new service agreements with Colgan Air, Trans States subsidiary GoJet Airlines, and Republic Airways Holdings subsidiaries Chautauqua Airlines and Shuttle America. Mesa Airlines was also reinstated into the United Express system.

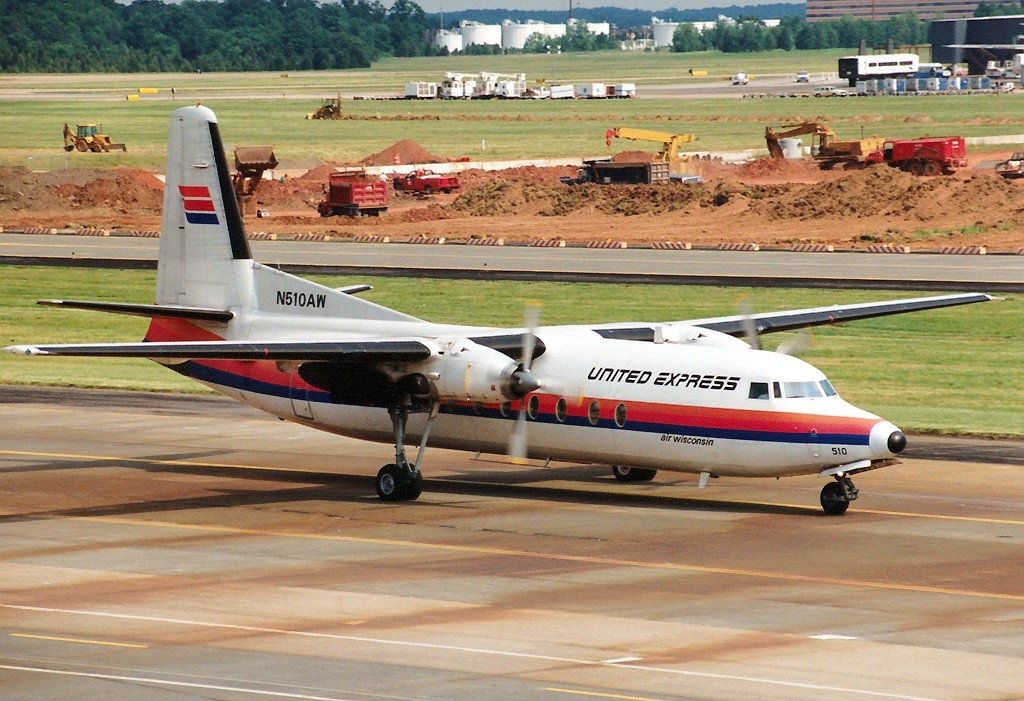
Former United Express Fokker F27 operated by Air Wisconsin in the 1985–1993 livery at Washington Dulles International Airport in May 1990

In 2005, United announced that service levels on major United Express routes would be upgraded to a new product called explus. Routes with explus service offer First Class seats and meal service on larger, 70-seat Embraer 170s and 66-seat Bombardier CRJ700s. Expanding the traditional regional partner role, United started to use the airplanes configured with explus amenities instead of, or alongside with, mainline jets on routes linking large cities, such as Chicago to Houston.

United announced a new Express focus city in San Antonio in 2006, but the experiment was short-lived. Trans States was the carrier operating the San Antonio operation.

United decided to cancel Dash 8 and CRJ200 service with Mesa Airlines in November 2009. On November 16, 2009, it was announced that ExpressJet would begin operating Embraer ERJ 145s beginning in the spring of 2010. Mesa Airlines continued service using CRJ700 regional jets and added the Embraer 175 in 2015.

All Continental Express and Continental Connection service officially merged into United Express in late 2010, including that of Cape Air, which was operating as Continental Connection on behalf of Continental Micronesia in Guam. Silver Airways was also a Continental Connection carrier that converted to United Express using turbo prop aircraft. Silver operated throughout Florida, as well as routes from Washington Dulles Airport; however, their affiliation as United Express ended in 2013.

On April 1, 2012, Pinnacle Airlines Corp. filed for bankruptcy and announced it would draw down its Colgan Air operation. In May, United reached a deal with Republic Airways Holdings for its subsidiary Republic Airways to fly the Q400 in Colgan's place. The eight-year capacity purchase agreement included all 28 aircraft previously operated by Colgan as well as four currently flown by Republic for Frontier Airlines.

In August 2015, United announced the start of a new subsidiary, United Ground Express (UGS), to provide ground operation service in select airports within its domestic network. UGS has grown to serve 60 United line stations and three hubs.

By September 2016, Republic Airways’ Q400s were phased out of service, replacing them with 50 more Embraer 175s.

On February 27, 2017, United Airlines announced the return of their partnership with Air Wisconsin as a United Express carrier. They would be flying a fleet of 65 Bombardier CRJ200s beginning second-half 2017.

In September 2017, the Q300 was phased out, and in January 2018, the Q200 was phased out. These were the final prop aircraft in the United Express system within the United States.

On April 16, 2018, United Airlines announced the end of its partnership with Cape Air. Services ended on May 31, 2018, which marked the end of United Express operations in Guam, along with the retirement of the last turboprop aircraft in the United Express fleet.

In March 2020, during the COVID-19 pandemic, Trans States Airlines announced that it would be ceasing operations on April 1, 2020, ending its operations as part of United Express.

On July 30, 2020, it was announced that United Airlines had decided to end its contract with ExpressJet and transferred these operations to CommuteAir. ExpressJet continued its operations until September 30, 2020, and CommuteAir became the sole operator of the United Express Embraer ERJ 145 fleet.

In August 2022, Air Wisconsin announced that it would again be leaving the United Express brand and transferring exclusively to American Eagle. The transition started in March 2023.

United selected SpaceX's Starlink as its in-flight internet connectivity provider for mainline and two-class regional aircraft in September 2024. This high-speed, low latency satellite internet service will enable live streaming, cloud-based work applications, and gaming, with complimentary access provided to all passengers.

United Airlines entered into a sale-leaseback agreement with Mesa Airlines in late 2024, under which United would purchase 18 Embraer 175 aircraft from Mesa for $230 million, then lease those aircraft back to Mesa. The deal involved the transfer of eight E175s by the end of December 2024, with the remaining ten aircraft in early 2025.

=== Former fleet ===
Historical regional jet fleet

Aircraft	Total	Introduced	Retired	Notes
BAe 146-100	4	1988	2004	Operated by Air Wisconsin and Aspen Airways
BAe 146-200	19	1985	2006	Operated by Air Wisconsin and WestAir Commuter Airlines
BAe 146-300	5	1988	2006	Operated by Air Wisconsin
Bombardier CRJ100	4	2005	2008	Operated by Mesa Airlines
Bombardier CRJ100	2	2009	2016	Operated by SkyWest Airlines
Bombardier CRJ100	1	2019	2019	Operated by ExpressJet
Bombardier CRJ900	38	2023	2025	Operated by Mesa Airlines
Dornier 328	23	1998	2003	Operated by Air Wisconsin
Embraer ERJ 135	9	2010	2018	Former Continental Express, operated by ExpressJet
Embraer E170	38	2015	2026	Operated by Republic Airways

Historical turboprop fleet

The United Express brand, through its various regional and commuter airline partners, operated a variety of twin turboprop aircraft over the years including the following types.

Aircraft	Total	Introduced	Retired	Notes
ATR 42	3	2010	2018	Operated by Cape Air in Guam only
BAe ATP	10	1993	2000	Operated by United Feeder Service
BAe Jetstream 41	41	1993	2004	Operated by Atlantic Coast Airlines
Beechcraft 1900D	45	1995	2013	Operated by Great Lakes Airlines and Silver Airways
de Havilland Canada Dash 8-100	5	1993	1995	Operated by Atlantic Coast Airlines
de Havilland Canada Dash 8-200	1	1996	1997	Operated by Mesa Airlines
de Havilland Canada Dash 8-200	2	2003	2010	Operated by Mesa Airlines
de Havilland Canada Dash 8-Q200	2	1996	1997	Operated by Mesa Airlines
de Havilland Canada Dash 8-Q200	7	2003	2010	Operated by Mesa Airlines
de Havilland Canada Dash 8-Q200	16	2010	2018	Former Continental Connection, operated by CommutAir
de Havilland Canada Dash 8-300	2	1989	1990	Operated by Presidential Airways
de Havilland Canada Dash 8-300	7	1995	1996	Operated by Mesa Airlines
de Havilland Canada Dash 8-Q300	5	2011	2017	Operated by CommutAir
de Havilland Canada Dash 8-Q400	33	2010	2016	Operated by Republic Airways from 2012 until 2016 Previously operated by Colgan Air from 2010 until 2012
Dornier 328	21	1998	2003	Operated by Air Wisconsin
Embraer EMB 120	103	1990	2015	Operated by Great Lakes Airlines, SkyWest Airlines, WestAir Commuter Airlines
Saab 340	32	2004	2012	Operated by Colgan Air and Shuttle America

== Accidents and incidents ==
- On December 26, 1989, United Express Flight 2415 operated by North Pacific Airlines, a BAe Jetstream 31, crashed on approach to Tri-Cities Airport near Pasco, Washington. The four passengers and two crew members on board were killed. The crew executed an excessively steep and unstabilized instrument landing system (ILS) approach. That approach, along with improper air traffic control commands and aircraft icing, caused the aircraft to stall and crash short of the runway.
- On January 7, 1994, United Express Flight 6291 operated by Atlantic Coast Airlines, a BAe Jetstream 41 crashed on approach to Port Columbus International Airport. Two passengers and three crew members were killed, while three passengers (a Taiwanese family) survived the accident. The NTSB report concluded the aircraft was never properly stabilized for the approach to runway 28L. The aircraft slowed to a stall, which was not recognized by the flight crew in a timely manner. The subsequent stall recovery was performed contrary to the Airplane Flight Manual procedure, which resulted in the aircraft impacting the ground less than 2 miles from the runway. Furthermore, after investigating the backgrounds of the cockpit crew, the NTSB concluded that Atlantic Coast shouldn't have paired an inexperienced first officer with a captain who had a history of failed check rides.
- On November 19, 1996, United Express Flight 5925 operated by Great Lakes Airlines, a Beechcraft 1900C collided with a King Air during landing at Quincy Regional Airport. The ten passengers and two crew members on board were killed. The pilots of the King Air were blamed for failing to effectively monitor both the common frequency and to scan for traffic.
- On April 9, 2017, passenger Dr. David Dao was dragged off of United Express Flight 3411 by law enforcement. He had been selected to be deplaned to make room for deadheading crew, but had refused to give up his seat, stating that he needed to see patients the following day. He suffered a concussion, lost teeth, and a broken nose. The airline later faced criticism and backlash for how the incident was handled.
- On March 4, 2019, United Express Flight 4933 operated by CommuteAir, a Embraer ERJ 145, landed in a snow-covered grassy area to the right of the runway at Presque Isle International Airport and was severely damaged; two passengers and the first officer suffered minor injuries. The accident was attributed to an inadequately reported ILS misalignment combined with "confirmation bias" and fatigue that led the first officer to continue the approach despite being unable to see the runway due to blowing snow.
