= 2000 Executive Airlines British Aerospace Jetstream crash =

Plane crash in Pennsylvania, United States

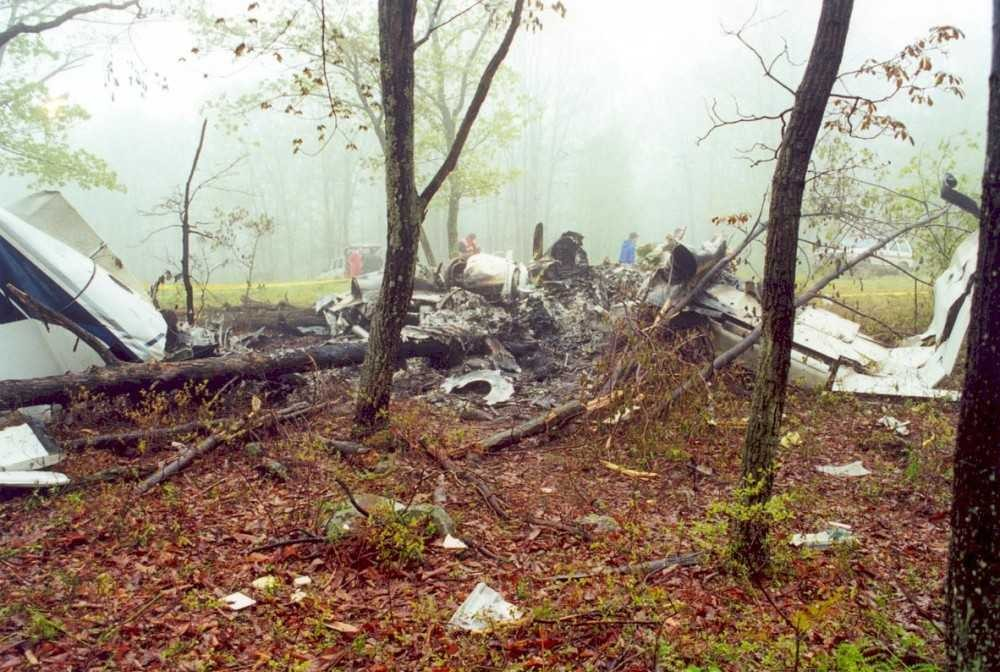
- Crash site of the aircraft

Accident
- Date: May 21, 2000
- Summary: Fuel exhaustion
- Site: Poconos Mountains, Bear Creek Township, Wilkes-Barre, Pennsylvania, United States; 41°9′23″N 75°45′53″W

Aircraft
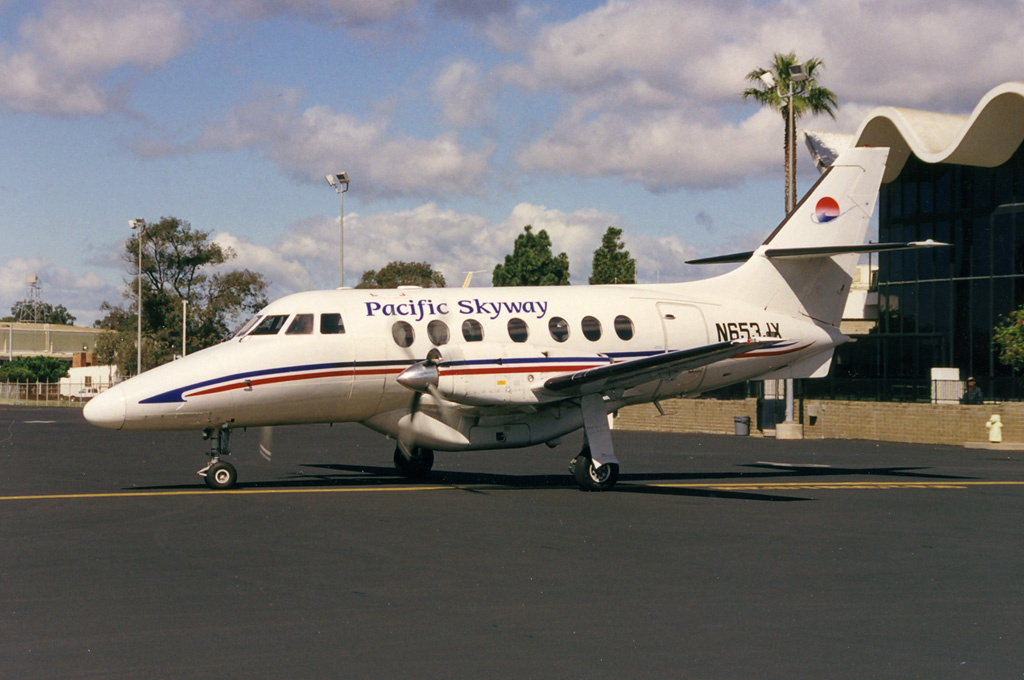
- A British Aerospace Jetstream 3101 similar to the crashed aircraft
- Aircraft type: British Aerospace BAe-3101 Jetstream 3101
- Operator: East Coast Aviation Services d/b/a Executive Airlines
- Call sign: 16 ECHO JULIET
- Registration: N16EJ
- Flight origin: Atlantic City International Airport, Atlantic City, New Jersey
- Destination: Scranton International Airport, Wilkes-Barre, Pennsylvania
- Occupants: 19
- Passengers: 17
- Crew: 2
- Fatalities: 19
- Survivors: 0

On May 21, 2000, a British Aerospace BAe-3101 Jetstream 3101 operated by East Coast Aviation Services (known operationally as Executive Airlines) crashed into mountainous terrain in Bear Creek Township, Wilkes-Barre, Pennsylvania. The plane was carrying 17 professional gamblers returning home from Caesar's Palace Casino in Atlantic City, New Jersey, along with 2 crew members. It was chartered by Caesar's Palace (New Jersey). All 19 passengers and crew on board were killed on impact. This accident, alongside the accident of Aerocaribe Flight 7831 were the accidents with the most fatalities involving the Jetstream 3101 airliner.

An investigation was conducted by the National Transportation Safety Board. It found that while the aircraft was approaching Scranton International Airport, it ran out of fuel. The investigation found that the crews were supposed to refill the aircraft with a total of 180 gallons of fuel. Instead, they refilled with 90 gallons.

Although the final report concluded that fuel exhaustion was the cause of the crash, it was not received warmly by some relatives of the victims. Several of them filed lawsuits against Executive Airlines and British Aerospace. Executive Airlines chief executive Michael Peragine questioned the NTSB report, claiming that it dismissed several other factors that might have been beneficial to the investigation.

== Flight ==
The crew initially was supposed to take a flight from Farmingdale, New York to Atlantic City, New Jersey at 09:00 local time. However, the crew later received a phone call from the Executive Airlines' owner and CEO detailing that they had been assigned another flight to Wilkes-Barre, with a return flight to Atlantic City later in the day. Ninety gallons of fuel was added to the aircraft, and it departed for Farmingdale at 09:21 local time with 12 passengers on board, under command of Captain Cam Basat. It arrived at Atlantic City International Airport at 09:49.

The second leg of the flight was from Atlantic City to Wilkes-Barre. This flight segment was flown by the same crew, with First Officer Gregory MacVicar as pilot flying. No fuel was added on this flight segment. The plane departed Atlantic City at 10:30 with 17 passengers on board. It was cleared to fly at 5,000' above mean sea level.

=== Approach to Wilkes-Barre ===
As the flight neared Wilkes-Barre, the crew established contact with the approach controller for clearance, which was granted. The crew was given a radar vector for an ILS approach. Their first attempt to land, however, was not successful. The crew executed a missed approach, and started a second approach with another ILS radar vector.

=== Start of engine failure ===
At 11:23, the crew declared an emergency and indicated they had an "engine failure". The crew was given yet another radar vector by the air traffic controller. At 11:25, as the aircraft was descending through 3,000', the controller warned that the minimum vectoring altitude (MVA) was 3,300' within the sector.

The controller also read out the weather condition in the vicinity, and informed the crew about the location of nearby highways, suggesting that they could make an emergency landing. The crew declined, and asked for a radar vector to the airport. As the radar vector was given to the crew, the flight disappeared from the radar screen. Communications between the crew and the controller, however, continued.

=== Crash ===
At 11:27, the crew reported that they had "gotten back the left engine now", and radar contact was re-established. However, a few seconds later the crew reported that they had lost both engines. The controller informed them that the Pennsylvania Turnpike was right below them, and requested they "let [ATC] know if you can get your engines back". There was no further radio contact.

Emergency crews were notified at 11:30, and began searching for the crash site. The wreckage was found at 12:45 p.m local time. There were no survivors. In response to the crash, the airport fire department was turned into a makeshift encampment for the relatives of the victims.

== Passengers and crew ==
The aircraft had been chartered by Atlantic City's Caesar's Palace for 17 professional gamblers. All of the victims were believed to be residents of Wilkes-Barre and Scranton. They had been planned to return after an overnight trip at 1:15 a.m, however due to bad weather the flight had to be postponed until the morning.

The pilot flying on the crash leg was First Officer Gregory MacVicar, age 38. At the time of the accident, he had accumulated 1,282 total flying hours, of which about 742 hours were in the Jetstream 3101. He joined Executive Airlines on November 9, 1998.

The pilot monitoring was Captain Cam Basat, age 34. He joined Executive Airlines in 1998 as a part-time pilot. At the time, he was a full-time pilot for Atlantic Coast Airlines. At the time of the accident, the captain had accumulated about 8,500 flying hours, including about 1,874 hours as pilot-in-command in the Jetstream.

== Aircraft ==
The plane involved in the accident was a British Aerospace Jetstream 3101, registered as N16EJ. It was delivered by British Aerospace on 1988 as N851JS. Executive Airlines purchased the airplane on October 28, 1996, from Fairchild Dornier. Its registration was changed to N16EJ in September 1997. First operation of the plane was in December 1997. At the time of the accident, the plane had accumulated a total of 18,503 cycles, totaling 13,972 flight hours.

It was discovered that the plane had been involved in several incidents before the crash. In 1989, the plane was substantially damaged after it overran a runway and impacted terrain after an aborted take-off. In 1991, the plane had an engine fire.

== Investigation ==
The ATC recording showed that, while the plane was approaching Scranton, the crew on board transmitted a message that an engine failure had occurred on board. The NTSB suspected that fuel exhaustion may have caused the failure. This was proved by their examination of the crash site. The NTSB stated that had the flight been filled with sufficient fuel, then the burnt area should have been wider than expected. In the case of this flight, the burnt area was concentrated into a small and compact area.

The cockpit voice recorder unfortunately could not be used for investigation due to improper power configuration. The aircraft was not equipped with flight data recorder as it was not required for such type of plane.

Analysis of the airplane log pages and flight crew records indicated that about 1,000 pounds of fuel were on board the airplane before the 600 pounds (90 gallons) were added on the day of the accident. The NTSB revealed that the crew had planned to add another 180 gallons of fuel. According to the NTSB, if the flight crew intended to load 180 gallons (about 1,200 pounds), it was common industry and company practice to ask for 90 gallons on each side (the left tank and right tank). However, due to a miscommunication, only 90 gallons (600 pounds) of fuel were added to the plane. The crew did order 90 gallons of fuel, but did not specify that it should be added to both tanks. Thus, only 90 gallons of fuel were added, a total confirmed by the fuel order receipt, which the crew most likely did not read.

Captain Basat and First Officer MacVicar then completed the load manifest. They stated that the plane was loaded with 2,400 pounds of fuel when it departed from Farmingdale. In reality, there were only 1,600 pounds of fuel on board, 800 pounds less than intended. Calculations by the NTSB revealed that if the plane were loaded with a total of 2,400 pounds of fuel, then the crew would not have had to refuel in Atlantic City.

Since the crew believed that there was enough fuel on board, they apparently ignored the low fuel quantity annunciator lights that should have warned them of their lack of fuel. However, the NTSB stated that these lights can be easily "overlooked".

As the plane ran out of fuel, the right engine stopped. This failure on the right engine caused the plane to deviate from its planned track. Although the pilots were able to restart the engine, it failed again seconds later, along with the left engine. Low airspeed then caused loss of control of the plane.

The final accident report was published on August 29, 2002, and concluded the cause of the crash was pilot error:

"The National Transportation Safety Board determines that the probable cause of this accident was the flight crew's failure to ensure an adequate fuel supply for the flight, which led to the stoppage of the right engine due to fuel exhaustion and the intermittent stoppage of the left engine due to fuel starvation. Contributing to the accident were the flight crew's failure to monitor the airplane's fuel state and the flight crew's failure to maintain directional control after the initial engine stoppage."

== Aftermath ==
Following the release of the final report, relatives of the victims began suing Executive Airlines for negligence. The aircraft's manufacturer, British Aerospace, was also sued for undisclosed reasons. CEO of Executive Airlines Michael Peragine challenged the NTSB for allegedly overlooking several factors that might have contributed to the accident. However, a lawsuit totalling $32 million USD was eventually settled, which was made public by U.S District Court for Scranton in 2003.

== See also ==
- Aerocaribe Flight 7831
- United Airlines Flight 173
