= United Express Flight 2415 =

1989 aviation accident

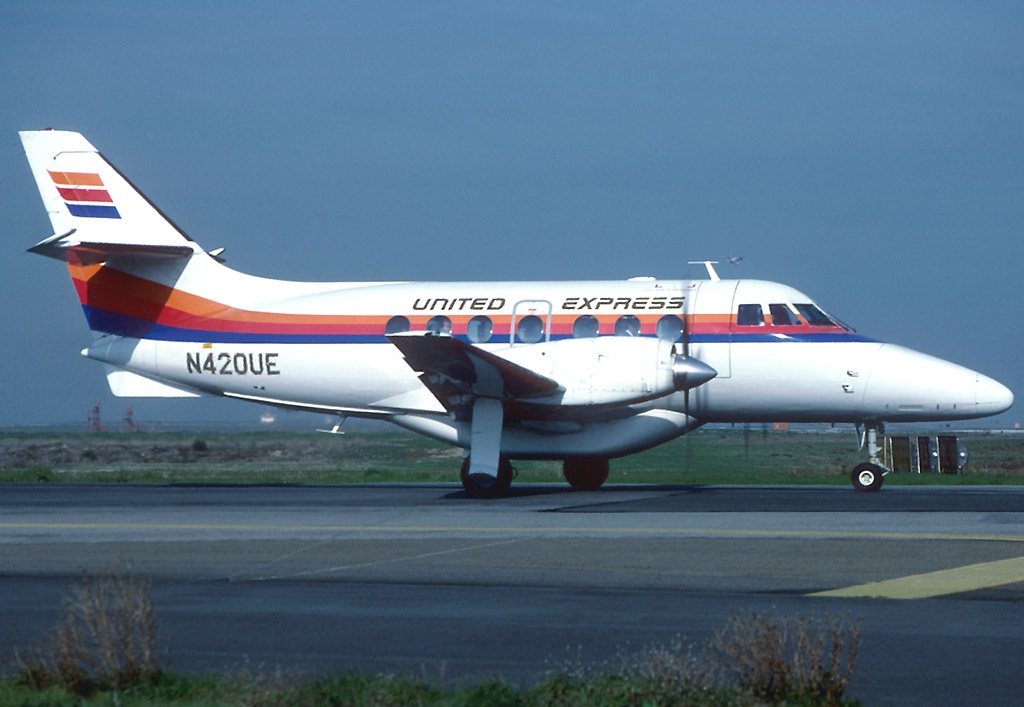
- A United Express BAe Jetstream 31, similar to the aircraft involved in the incident

Accident
- Date: December 26, 1989
- Summary: Loss of control following low-altitude stall
- Site: Tri-Cities Airport, Pasco, Washington, United States; 46.271°N 119.111°W

Aircraft
- Aircraft type: BAe Jetstream 31
- Operator: North Pacific Airlines DBA United Express
- ICAO flight No.: NPE415
- Call sign: SUNDANCE 415
- Registration: N410UE
- Flight origin: Seattle–Tacoma International Airport, Seattle, Washington
- Stopover: Yakima Air Terminal, Yakima, Washington, United States
- Destination: Tri-Cities Airport, Pasco, Washington, United States
- Occupants: 6
- Passengers: 4
- Crew: 2
- Fatalities: 6
- Survivors: 0

United Express Flight 2415 was a regularly scheduled flight in the northwest United States from Seattle to Pasco, Washington, operated using a BAe Jetstream 31. Late on Tuesday, December 26, 1989, Flight 2415 crashed while attempting to land at Pasco's Tri-Cities Airport, killing both pilots and all four passengers aboard.

== Background ==
=== Aircraft ===
On the night of the accident, Flight 2415 was operated using a BAe Jetstream 31 twin-turboprop airliner, registration number N410UE. The aircraft was manufactured two years earlier in October 1987, and had accumulated approximately 4,972 flight hours at the time of the accident. The aircraft was not equipped with a ground proximity warning system and did not have a cockpit voice recorder or flight data recorder.

=== Crew ===
The captain was 38-year-old Barry W. Roberts. He had 6,600 flight hours, including 670 hours on the Jetstream. The first officer was 25-year-old Douglas K. McInroe, who had 2,792 flight hours with 213 of them on the Jetstream.

== Accident ==
Flight 2415 departed Seattle at 20:45 PST, and arrived at Yakima with no reported mechanical difficulties. A company station agent at Yakima witnessed First Officer McInroe knocking ice off the wings of the aircraft, with the assistance of another company first officer. She asked Captain Roberts whether he wanted his aircraft deiced, but the captain declined. She also asked if the captain wanted Flight 2415's tail deiced, since the first officers deicing the wings would be unable to reach the tail surfaces. Roberts declined this as well. Flight 2415 was the only flight to depart Yakima that afternoon/evening that was not deiced prior to departure.

At 21:59, air traffic controllers at the Yakima tower announced that Yakima airport was closed due to weather conditions. However, at 22:00, Flight 2415 contacted Yakima ground controllers and were cleared to proceed to Yakima's runway 27 for departure. Ground controllers advised Flight 2415 of "light to moderate mixed icing" between 4,000 and 18,000 feet (1,200 and 5,500 m), which Flight 2415 acknowledged. At 22:01, Flight 2415 departed Yakima en route to Pasco, and climbed to a cruising altitude of 11,000 feet (3,400 m).

At 22:26, Flight 2415 was cleared for an Instrument Landing System (ILS) approach to runway 21R at Pasco's Tri-Cities Airport. Conversations between Flight 2415 and controllers were normal in the minutes leading up to the crash, and no distress call was made.

At 22:30, while Flight 2415 was on final approach, the Pasco tower controller observed Flight 2415 flying "higher than normal" for a final approach, and also descending faster than normal. The controller watched Flight 2415 descend until it struck the ground 400 feet (120 m) short of runway 21R. The controller alerted emergency response crews, who arrived at the crash site at 22:34; the aircraft was destroyed, and there were no survivors.

== Investigation ==
The accident was investigated by the National Transportation Safety Board. Investigators determined that the airplane was flying well above the glideslope for an ILS approach. From the plane's last recorded position, investigators determined that Flight 2415 would need to follow a 7-degree glidepath in order to descend rapidly enough to reach the runway threshold. This is more than twice the glidepath angle for an ILS approach and would have required a high descent rate of 2,000 to 3,000 feet (610 to 915 m) per minute. Investigators also determined that ice had likely built up on the plane's wings during the flight, creating a higher risk of a stall at low speeds. According to radar data, Flight 2415 had slowed to 110 knots (205 km/h; 125 mph) as it attempted to descend. The combination of an excessively steep descent, low speed, and aircraft icing likely resulted in loss of control of the aircraft.

On November 4, 1991, the NTSB issued its final report on the crash, which contained the following conclusions:

The National Transportation Safety Board determines that the probable cause of this accident was the flightcrew's decision to continue an unstabilized instrument landing system approach that led to a stall, most likely of the horizontal stabilizer, and loss of control at low altitude. Contributing to the accident was the air traffic controller's improper vectors that positioned the airplane inside the outer marker while it was still well above the glideslope. Contributing to the stall and loss of control was the accumulation of airframe ice that degraded the aerodynamic performance of the airplane.
