= Aerocaribe Flight 7831 =

2000 aviation incident in Mexico

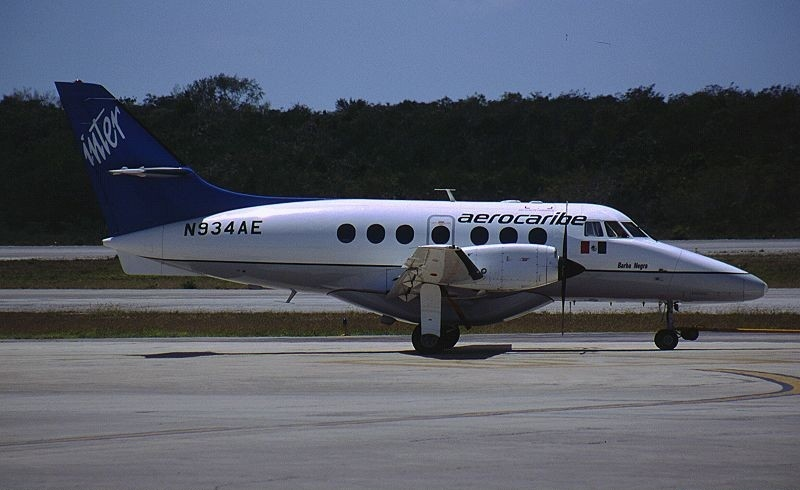
- An Aerocaribe Jetstream 32EP similar to the accident aircraft

Accident
- Date: 8 July 2000
- Summary: Controlled flight into terrain in inclement weather due to pilot error and lack of situational awareness and crew resource management
- Site: Near Chulum Juarez, Mexico; 17°24′0″N 92°28′59″W

Aircraft
- Aircraft type: British Aerospace Jetstream
- Operator: Aerocaribe
- Registration: N912FJ
- Flight origin: Francisco Sarabia National Airport, Mexico
- Destination: Villahermosa International Airport, Mexico
- Occupants: 19
- Passengers: 17
- Crew: 2
- Fatalities: 19
- Survivors: 0

Aerocaribe Flight 7831 was a British Aerospace Jetstream 32EP, registration N912FJ, with 17 passengers and two crew on an intra-Mexican short haul flight from Terán Airport in Tuxtla Gutiérrez, Chiapas, to Villahermosa International Airport in Villahermosa, Tabasco. On 8 July 2000, Flight 7831 departed Téran at approximately 19:30. Subsequently, it encountered severe weather, which the captain requested permission from air traffic control (ATC) at Tuxtla Gutiérrez to fly around.

ATC granted the request, and the flight turned to the right, but at 19:50 Flight 7831 crashed in a mountainous area while descending, bursting into flames on impact near Chulum Juarez, Chiapas. All 19 passengers and crew on board died.

== See also ==
- 2000 East Coast Aviation Services British Aerospace Jetstream crash
