= Tri-Cities Airport (Washington) =

International airport in southeast Washington, United States

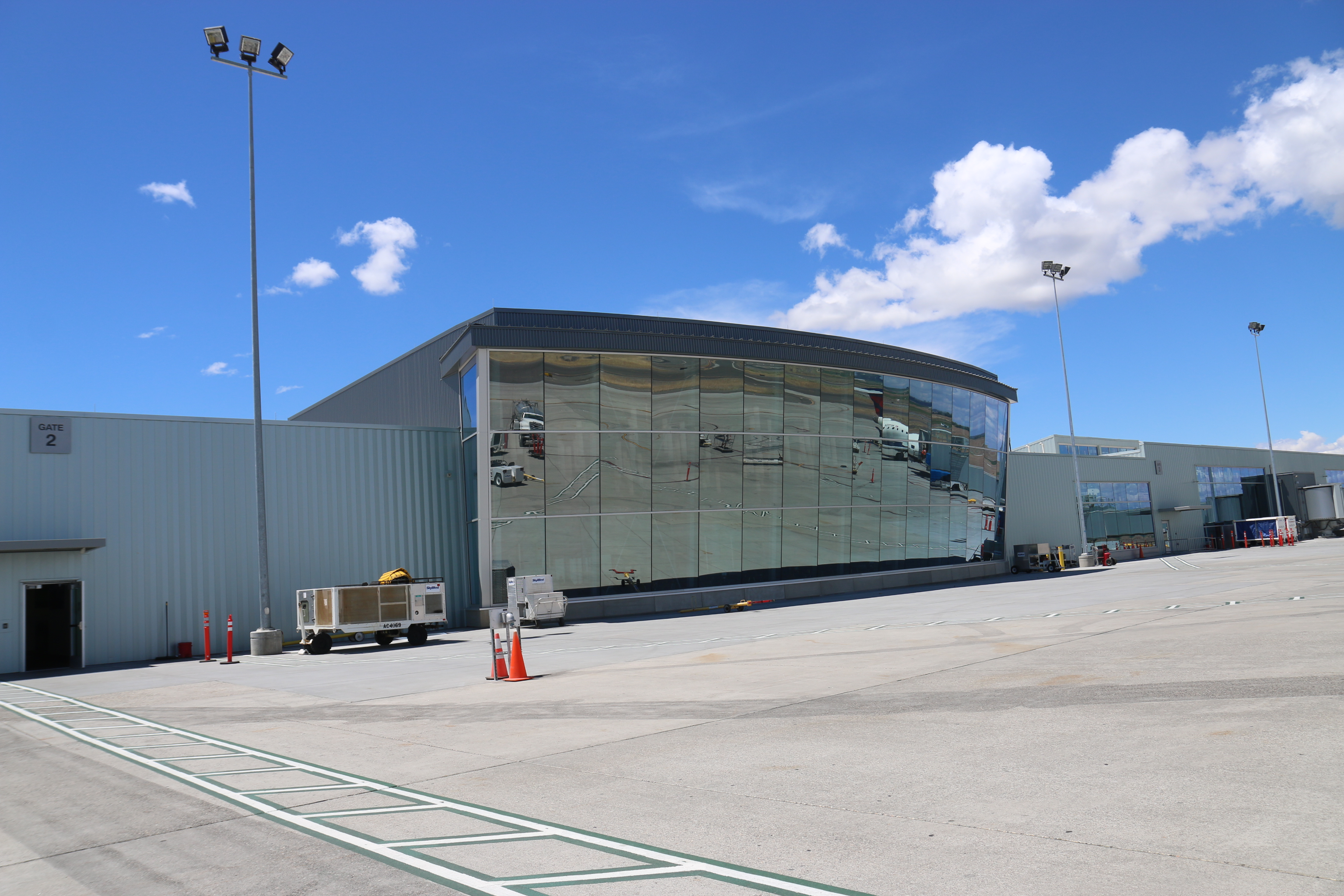
- View of passenger terminal from apron in 2017
- IATA: PSC; ICAO: KPSC; FAA LID: PSC

Summary
- Airport type: Public
- Owner: Port of Pasco, Washington
- Serves: Tri-Cities metropolitan area
- Location: Franklin County, Washington, U.S.
- Elevation AMSL: 410 ft (120 m)
- Coordinates: 46°15′52.84″N 119°07′8.5″W
- Website: www.flytricities.com

Maps
- FAA airport diagram as of January 2021
- Interactive map of Tri-Cities Airport

Runways
Direction	Length		Surface
Direction	ft	m	Surface
12/30	7,704	2,348	Asphalt
3L/21R	7,711	2,350	Asphalt
3R/21L	4,423	1,348	Asphalt

Statistics (2024)
- Aircraft operations: 52,950
- Total Passengers: 945,000
- Source: Federal Aviation Administration

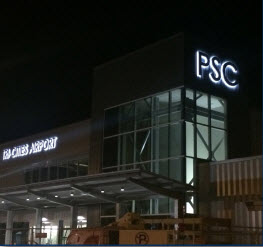
The terminal at night

Tri-Cities Airport (IATA: PSC, ICAO: KPSC, FAA LID: PSC) (originally Pasco Airport) is a public airport in Pasco, Washington, United States. It is two miles (3 km) northwest of downtown Pasco and serves the Tri-Cities metropolitan area in southeast Washington. The airport is the third-largest commercial airport in the state. The facility has three runways and covers 2,235 acres (3.49 mi^{2}; 9.04 km^{2}).

== History ==
The Tri-Cities Airport (originally Pasco Airport) was the site of the first airmail contract flight between Elko, Nevada, and Pasco, Washington, made by Varney Airlines (later United Airlines) in 1926. The airport was relocated to its present site and became known as the Franklin County Airport; the U.S. Navy built Naval Air Station Pasco in 1942 and was the third-busiest Naval training base in the United States during World War II. After the war, the Navy transferred the field to the City of Pasco for one dollar, but retained training privileges. Several Navy aircraft, especially the P-3 Orion and the P-8 Poseidon, used the field for landing and take-off training. The Port of Pasco took ownership in 1963 and opened doors to a new terminal building in 1966.

In 1955, the old administration building became the home of the newly established Columbia Basin College, which it remained until the current facility near Interstate 182 was built in 1966. The building later was leased to the Pasco School District #1, for use as Pasco Alternative High School (now New Horizons High School), until it was destroyed by fire in the mid-1980s. The new school is now situated near Columbia Basin College.

Pasco has had jet flights on several airlines, including Air West / Hughes Airwest with Douglas DC-9s, Cascade Airways with BAC One-Elevens, Delta Air Lines with Boeing 727-200s and 737-300s, Western Airlines with Boeing 727-200s, 737-200s, and 737-300s, Frontier Airlines with 737-200s, Pacific Southwest Airlines (PSA) with BAe 146-200s, Alaska Airlines with Boeing 727s, Horizon Air with Fokker F-28s and West Coast Airlines with DC-9s.

Currently, scheduled passenger flights are mostly regional jet and turboprop, although Allegiant Air operates Airbus A319s/320s and Delta operates Airbus A319s/320s and Boeing 717s. Horizon Air, a subsidiary of Alaska Airlines, formerly used a mix of Bombardier Q400 turboprop aircraft and Embraer E175 jets at Tri-Cities but now uses E175 jets exclusively since 2023.

An expansion and remodel project took place in 1986 which included access roads, parking lots, aircraft parking apron and more than doubling the size of the terminal.

In 2003, the airport underwent another expansion and remodel that added an additional 3,000 square feet (280 m^{2}) to the ticket lobby and boarding area.

In 2014, the Port of Pasco approved a $42 million renovation and expansion, planning to double the size of the terminal. The construction began in August 2014 and finished in January 2017. The first phase of the expansion was completed on September 7, 2015, which included a new west concourse with Gates 3, 4 and 5 as well as new car rental and baggage claim areas. The second phase started shortly thereafter, planning to demolish the old boarding area and replace it with a new east concourse to house Gates 1 and 2.

On January 27, 2017, the $42 million airport renovation and expansion, which added a new terminal, security area and baggage handling system was officially opened to the public. The new terminal is intended to meet the needs of the Tri-Cities metropolitan area for the next 20 years, with passenger enplanements/deplanements in 2019 reaching a new high of 870,900. The airport received a $7 million grant in 2025 to help fund the project.

== Current use ==
The airport's terminal at the south end of the field is the property of the Port of Pasco, at the north end of North 20th Avenue; firefighting, however, is handled by the city of Pasco. A new fire station has recently been built on the terminal grounds. The old Navy station buildings on the north end of the airport are being used by other firms.

The airport is undergoing a major resurfacing of the runways, funded by the American Recovery and Reinvestment Act.

== Major tenants and commercial activity ==
General and corporate aviation are important to PSC and they have many facilities to accommodate them. The airport has over 120 based aircraft that belong to business and general aviation operators. T-hangars are available on the airport and one FBO, Bergstrom Aircraft, Inc., offers fuel, aircraft maintenance, flight training and other services. The airport has one aircraft sales company, JD Aircraft Sales.

PSC also has commercial air traffic: the airport is served by the regional affiliates of several major airlines, such as Alaska and United. Delta Air Lines, and Allegiant Air operate mainline jets at present [when?]. Delta Air Lines flies Skywest E175s as well as Airbus A319s/A320s, with Allegiant Air flying Airbus 320s. Alaska Airlines, operated by Horizon Air, currently flies E175s. Empire Airlines operates FedEx Feeder also to the airport from Spokane International (GEG). The FedEx facility on the field goes through 40,000 pounds (18,000 kg) of inbound cargo daily. Empire Airlines usually operates ATR-42s and Cessna 208 Caravans, and also ATR-72s during higher cargo volume periods. The FedEx facility is a major source of revenue for the community, and it is planning to expand its facilities at PSC in the near future [as of when?].

In the year ending December 31, 2018, the airport had 48,211 aircraft operations, averaging 132 per day: 67% general aviation, 19% air carrier, 9% air taxi, and 5% military. At the time 121 aircraft were based at PSC, 80 single engine, 23 multi engine, 14 jet and 4 helicopter.

== Airlines and destinations ==
=== Passenger ===
Airlines	Destinations	Refs
Alaska Airlines	Los Angeles, Portland (OR), Seattle/Tacoma	
Allegiant Air	Las Vegas, Orange County, Phoenix/Mesa	
American Eagle	Phoenix–Sky Harbor	
Delta Air Lines	Minneapolis/St. Paul, Salt Lake City	
Delta Connection	Salt Lake City, Seattle/Tacoma	
United Airlines	Denver	
United Express	Denver, San Francisco	

Destinations map
Destinations from Tri Cities Airport
Red = Year-round destination
Green = Seasonal destination
Blue = Future destination

=== Cargo ===
Airlines	Destinations
Ameriflight	Seattle–Boeing, Spokane, Walla Walla
FedEx Feeder	Spokane

== Statistics ==
=== Top destinations ===
Busiest domestic routes from PSC (enplanements only) (May 2025 - April 2026)
Rank	City	Passengers	Carriers
1	(Washington (state)) Seattle/Tacoma, Washington	177,860	Alaska, Delta
2	Salt Lake City, Utah	93,660	Delta
3	Denver, Colorado	63,420	United
4	Phoenix–Sky Harbor, Arizona	45,350	American
5	San Francisco, California	35,280	United
6	Minneapolis/St. Paul, Minnesota	35,190	Delta
7	Los Angeles, California	24,580	Alaska
8	Phoenix/Mesa, Arizona	22,420	Allegiant
9	Las Vegas, Nevada	16,650	Allegiant
10	Burbank, California	13,830	Alaska, Avelo

=== Airline market share ===
Largest airlines at PSC (November 2024 - October 2025)
Rank	Airline	Passengers	Share
1	SkyWest	613,000	59.08%
2	Delta Air Lines	112,000	10.80%
3	Alaska Airlines	82,490	7.95%
4	Allegiant Airlines	80,220	7.73%
5	Horizon Air	78,060	7.52%
-	Other Airlines	71,850	6.92%

== Accidents and incidents ==
- On June 20, 1969, a Beechcraft Model 99 operated by Cascade Airways, bound for Spokane International Airport, pitched up steeply after takeoff, lost control and crashed. The probable causes were: the pitch trim was found in the full nose-up position and the captain's seat was unlocked and fully aft. Both occupants died.
- On December 19, 1989, a British Aerospace Jetstream operated by North Pacific Airlines on behalf of United Express Flight 2415, a domestic scheduled passenger flight inbound from Yakima Air Terminal, crashed on an instrument landing system (ILS) approach to PSC 400 feet short of runway 21. Ice buildup and an unstabilized approach were the probable causes. All four passengers and two crew were killed.
- On September 20, 2022, a Cessna 525B CitationJet CJ3 owned and operated by Pacific Cataract and Laser Institute, inbound from Chehalis, WA, with 10 people aboard, caught fire after landing on runway 3L. As of November 25, 2022, the accident is under investigation, but preliminary information indicates that the plane caught fire after a gear-up landing. All 10 people were evacuated and no injuries were reported, but the plane was written off.
