= IAC Mamba =

Mamba

General information
- Type: Two-seat light cabin monoplane
- National origin: Australia
- Manufacturer: Melbourne Aircraft Corporation; Australian Aircraft Industries
- Designer: Jess Smith
- Status: development continuing

History
- First flight: 25 January 1989

The IAC Mamba is an Australian two-seat light aircraft. It was designed and built by the Melbourne Aircraft Corporation (MAC) and first flew in 1989 as the MAC Mamba. In 1990, MAC changed its name to the International Aircraft Corporation (IAC).

The Mamba was intended for general aviation purposes, including leisure, training, and agricultural use. Development was supported by the Australian government's Grants for Industrial Research and Development (GIRD) scheme.

== Design and development ==
The Mamba is a strut-braced, high-wing monoplane designed over two years and first flown on 25 January 1989. It has fixed tricycle landing gear and is powered by a 116 hp (87 kW) Lycoming O-235 flat-four piston engine. It has an enclosed glazed cabin with side-by-side configuration seating for two. The fuselage is constructed of welded steel tubing with stressed aluminium skin. The Mamba was designed to be rugged and easily maintained, even in remote areas where use of more advanced materials might prove a liability.

MAC sought certification of the design under Australian standard ANO 101.22 and US FAR 23, and hoped to start manufacturing a two-seat version based on the prototype in 1989. A four-seat version was expected to enter production the following year, with a military version after that. Differences from the civil version were to include armour for the cabin and provision for underwing stores, including two 20-mm cannon. Intended applications included border patrol and counter-insurgency (COIN) operations.

Initial production was to be in Australia, at Echuca or Essendon, with MAC considering offshore production for the future. However, by 1992, production was still not underway, and Aviation Industries of Australia (AIA) was formed in Shepparton, to manufacture the design. A mockup of the four-seat version was built the same year.

A prototype of the military version was built under contract by Australian Aircraft Industries as the AA-2S Mamba powered by an IO-360. It was displayed as a static display at the 1999 Australian International Air Show at Avalon, Victoria.

As of 2022, Mamba Aircraft Company aimed to restart development, possibly in collaboration with Chinese aviation manufacturers.

== Variants ==
MA-2
also known as MA-2A and AA-2, Lycoming O-235-powered prototype built by Melbourne Aircraft Corporation, registration VH-JSA
MA-2C
Proposed civil production version
MA-2M
also known as AA-2M Lycoming IO-360-powered military variant built by Australian Aircraft Industries, registration VH-FCX
AA-2S
Lycoming IO-360-powered civilian under test by Mamba Aircraft Company
AA-4S
Lycoming O-320 four-place under development by Mamba Aircraft Company

== Specifications (Prototype) ==
Data from Jane's All the World's Aircraft 1989-90

General characteristics

- Crew: one
- Capacity: one passenger
- Length: 7.00 m (22 ft 11.5 in)
- Wingspan: 8.68 m (28 ft 5.75 in)
- Height: 2.38 m (7 ft 9.75 in)
- Wing area: 10.13 m^{2} (109.04 sq ft)
- Empty weight: 390 kg (860 lb)
- Gross weight: 680 kg (1,499 lb)
- Powerplant: 1 × Lycoming O-235-N2C flat-four piston engine , 86 kW (116 hp)

Performance

- Maximum speed: 250 km/h (155 mph, 135 kn)
- Endurance: 5 hours 42 minutes
- Rate of climb: 7.6 m/s (1,500 ft/min)

== See also ==
Aircraft of comparable role, configuration, and era

- Glasair GlaStar
