= AIS Airlines =

Dutch airline

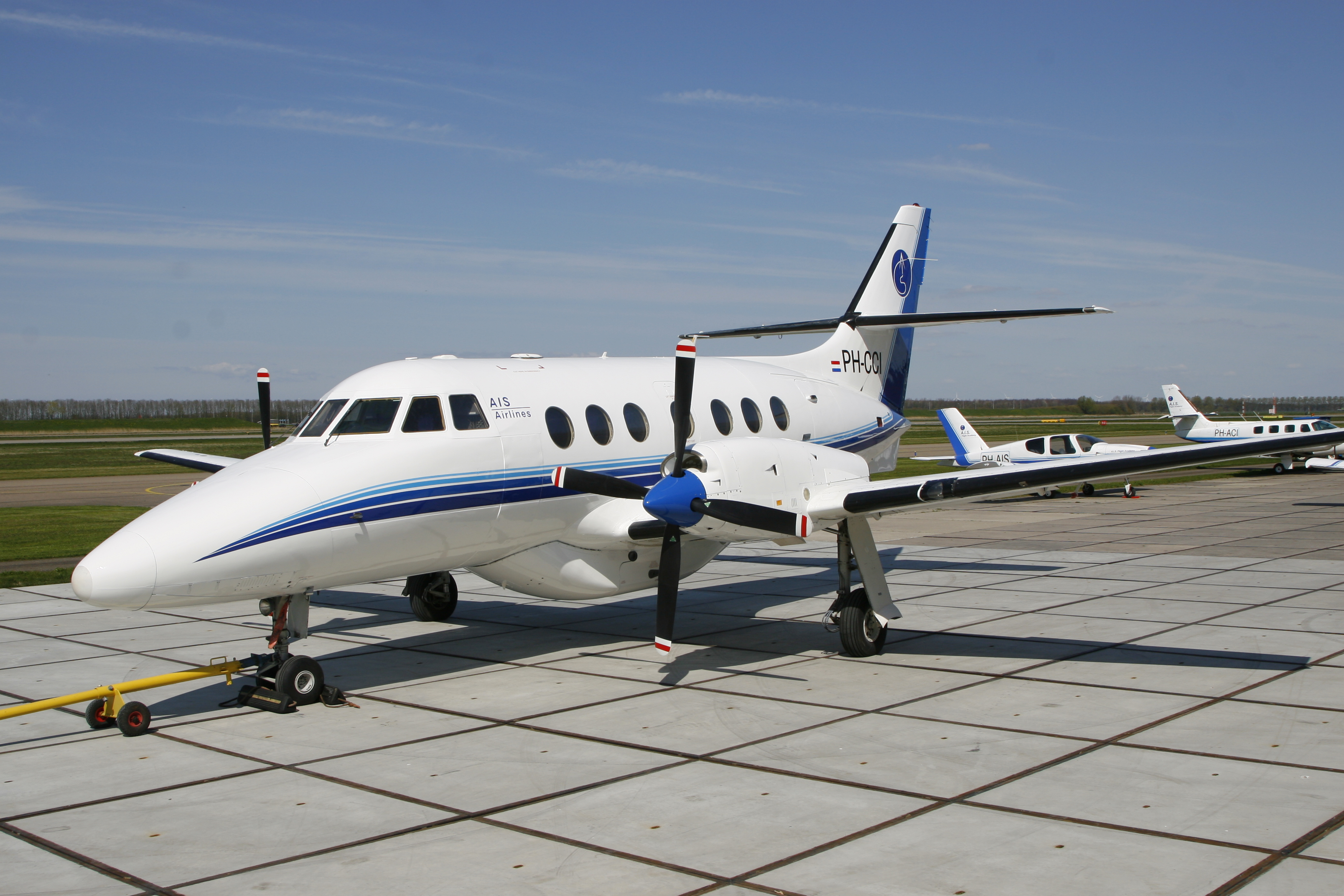
| IATA | ICAO | Call sign |
|---|---|---|
| — | PNX | SPINNER |
- Founded: 2009; 17 years ago
- Fleet size: 3
- Headquarters: Lelystad Airport
- Key people: Arend van der Meer (CEO)
- Website: http://www.aisairlines.com

AIS Airlines is a Dutch airline headquartered at Lelystad Airport in the Netherlands. AIS Airlines started in 2009 and provides charter and wet lease services all over Europe.

Scheduled service flights are mostly flown for third parties. At this time AIS Airlines has no own tickets sales, but chartered flights are provided by the company itself.

AIS Airlines operates British Aerospace Jetstream 32 airplanes with a capacity for 19 passengers.

== AIS Group ==
AIS Airlines is part of a group of aviation companies established at Lelystad Airport.

AIS Flight Academy is part of this group. It is a flight school specialized in airline pilot training which provides the BAe Jetstream type rating training. The full flight simulator in use is the only approved simulator for this aircraft type in the world.

The group also includes airplane maintenance organization AIS Technics, a CAMO maintenance management organization, and technical innovation organization AIS Development.

== History ==
The company started as a flight school and then expanded into the airline business.

The airline acquired two British Aerospace Jetstream 32 turboprop aircraft, PH-CCI and PH-DCI (former Tamir Airlines 4X-CII and 4X-CIJ). Upon receiving the Air Operator Certificate (AOC) in 2012, AIS Airlines started wet lease operations for Manx2, Airlink, Krohn Air and Direktflyg.

First routes under own commercial responsibility were started between Munster Osnabruck and Stuttgart. An expansion of scheduled routes, within Germany, in 2014, included Bremen to Zurich (both direct and via Munster), some of which were formerly served by the now-defunct OLT Express Germany.

A Jetstream 31, registered G-OAKI flew for a short period for the airline before being decommissioned, this aircraft was never added to the Dutch aircraft register. Later two former Krohn air aircraft were added to the fleet, PH-BCI and PH-HCI (former LN-FAN and LN-FAQ).

Flights from Bremen to Luxembourg, Malmö and Nuremberg were announced for autumn 2014, but these plans were later cancelled. Bremen – Zurich was cancelled a year later, only Munster – Stuttgart remained.

By January 2015, AIS Airlines additionally took over some Swedish domestic routes under its own brand, that it formerly operated on behalf of Direktflyg. These routes included:

- Borlange – Gotenborg
- Borlange - Orebro - Malmo
- Sveg – Mora – Stockholm Arlanda
- Torsby – Hagfors – Stockholm Arlanda
- Ostersund – Umea (later also Lulea)

Four former Direktflyg aircraft were added to the fleet: PH-NCI, PH-OCI (partly in AIS colours), PH-RCI and much later PH-FCI (still wearing Direktflyg livery). PH-ICI never made it into the fleet, in 2021 the aircraft was transported by road from Sweden to the AIS Airlines headquarter to be converted into an electric aircraft prototype.

Starting from 2016, AIS Airlines operated a domestic route network within Croatia with one BAe Jetstream 32, stationed in Osijek on behalf of Trade Air, routes included:

- Osijek – Zagreb
- Osijek – Rijeka – Split – Dubrovnik
- Osijek – Pula – Split

The contract was canceled in 2018 in favor of Vanair.

In 2018 flights from Borlange (flown under own commercial responsibility) were cancelled by the airline. Not long after that, AIS Airlines / Direktflyg lost the Swedish PSO routes to Jonair.

In 2019 AIS Airlines started cooperation with Groningen Airport Eelde to operate flights from Eelde to Copenhagen (flights previously operated by Estonian flag carrier Nordica), the network was later connected to the airlines already existing network in Munster.

On 27 February 2020, AIS Airlines discontinued the Münster-Osnabrück route to Copenhagen (via Groningen). Also the long existing Munster to Stuttgart route ceased to exist post COVID.

Since October 2021 AIS Airlines flew scheduled flights from Torsby to Stockholm Arlanda via Hagfors on behalf of Amapola Flyg. In 2023 the public service obligation contract went from Amapola Flyg to Jonair, and AIS Airlines stopped operating on that route.

AIS Airlines won contracts in Denmark for scheduled flights between Copenhagen Airport and Karup from 2023 until cooperation was ended in September 2025.

At its peak, the AIS Airlines route network and fleet peaked at eight operational aircraft and seven routes.

== Destinations ==
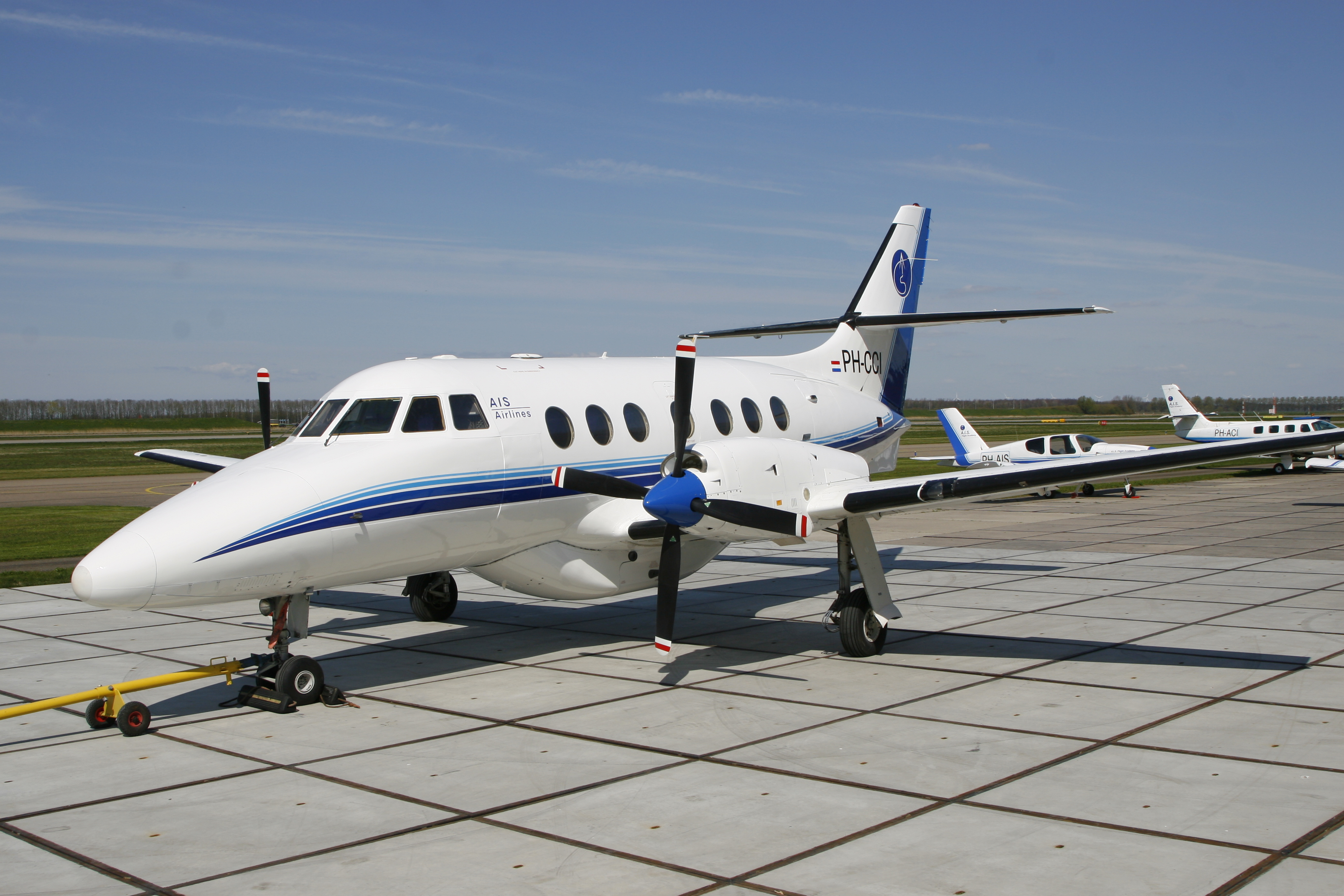
A British Aerospace Jetstream 32 of AIS Airlines at Lelystad Airport, with some of the aircraft of the AIS flying school in the background

Since January 2026 AIS Airlines has been contracted by Air Charter Schotland to operate a scheduled service on the public service obligation route between Wick and Aberdeen. By August 2026 this schedule has been extended to four weekly flights to Glasgow.

AIS Airlines has also been contracted by Italian touroperator Airidea to perform scheduled flights in Italy. A Jetstream 32 with a cabin configuration for 18 passengers plus 1 Italian speaking cabin attendant is based at Genoa Airport. Since October 2026 AIS Airlines operates a scheduled service between Genoa and Trieste. Per November 2026 scheduled service to Marseille was added, serving shipbuilding industries in both cities as well as the public.

== Fleet ==
Currently, AIS Airlines operates the following aircraft fleet:

AIS Airlines Fleet
| Aircraft | In Service | Orders | Passengers (Economy) | Notes |
|---|---|---|---|---|
| British Aerospace Jetstream 32 | 3 | 0 | 19 | |
| Total | 3 | 0 | | |

== Electrification of the British Aerospace Jetstream 32 ==
AIS Development is concentrating on new developments in electric flying. AIS is in the process of developing an electric type of Jetstream. The Jetstream is one of the first to be developed in terms of size and possibilities.

The project was expected to run from 15 February 2021 to 31 December 2023.

== Incident ==
On October 8th 2019, a Jetstream 32 experienced flight control problems during the takeoff at Münster Osnabrück Airport.

The takeoff was aborted at high speed and the airplane experienced a temporary runway excursion until coming to a stop on the runway. The airplane was damaged but there were no injuries. The subsequent incident investigation revealed that the internal gust lock mechanism was not released before takeoff.

A mechanical defect in the gust lock mechanism was noted, making it possible to commence the takeoff with the gust lock mechanism engaged. This has led to the issue of an airworthiness directive by the British Civil Aviation Authority.

Contributing factors were a difference in the checklist formulated by AIS Airlines and the original checklist issued by the manufacturer and an incorrect application of the checklist by the flight crew.
