= Aerostar AG-6 =

AG-6

General information
- Type: Agricultural aircraft
- National origin: Romania
- Manufacturer: Aerostar
- Status: Prototype only
- Number built: 1

History
- First flight: 12 January 1989

The Aerostar AG-6 (also known as the IAR AG-6) was a prototype Romanian agricultural aircraft of the late 1980s, developed for IAv, of Bacău. The company was later known as Aerostar.

The AG-6 was a single-engine biplane, of which a single example was built, with no production following.

== Design and development ==
In 1986, a team led by the engineer Constantin Rosca began work at the Romanian Aviation Institute on the design of a single-engine agricultural aircraft, the AG-6. The AG-6 was a single-engine tractor biplane with a fixed tailwheel undercarriage, and had a similar layout to the American Grumman Ag-Cat. The aircraft's fuselage was of welded steel tube construction, with the forward fuselage and wings covered in duralumin and the rear fuselage fabric covered. The pilot sat in an enclosed cockpit aft of the wings, with a glassfibre hopper for liquid or powered agricultural chemicals fitted forward of the cockpit. The aircraft was powered by a Soviet Vedeneyev M14P radial engine, rated at 190 kilowatts (260 hp) which drove a two-bladed variable-pitch propeller.

A prototype was built at the Bacău factory of IAv (Intreprinderea de Avione) (now Aerostar), making its first flight on 12 January 1989. In 1991, the Romanian aircraft industry was privatised, but a shortage of finance resulted in several projects, including the AG-6, being abandoned. Only the single prototype was built.

== Specifications ==
Data from Jane's All The World's Aircraft 1992–93

General characteristics

- Crew: 1
- Capacity: 1,050 L (280 US gal; 230 imp gal)
- Length: 6.96 m (22 ft 10 in)
- Upper wingspan: 10.56 m (34 ft 8 in)
- Lower wingspan: 10.26 m (33 ft 8 in)
- Height: 3.20 m (10 ft 6 in)
- Wing area: 26.00 m^{2} (279.9 sq ft)
- Empty weight: 917 kg (2,022 lb)
- Max takeoff weight: 1,900 kg (4,189 lb) (restricted category)
- Fuel capacity: 200 L (53 US gal; 44 imp gal)
- Powerplant: 1 × Vedeneyev M14P nine-cylinder air-cooled radial engine, 270 kW (360 hp)

Performance

- Maximum speed: 190 km/h (120 mph, 100 kn)
- Cruise speed: 150–175 km/h (93–109 mph, 81–94 kn) (working speed)
- Stall speed: 110 km/h (68 mph, 59 kn) (power off)
- Range: 530 km (330 mi, 290 nmi) (30 minute reserves)
- Service ceiling: 5,000 m (16,000 ft)
- Rate of climb: 3.5 m/s (690 ft/min)
