= North Pacific Airlines =

American commuter airline (1987–1991)

IATA	ICAO	Call sign
NO	NPE	SUNDANCE
- Founded: 1987; 39 years ago
- Ceased operations: By 1991; 35 years ago
- Hubs: Seattle–Tacoma International Airport (SEA), Portland International Airport (PDX)
- Frequent-flyer program: United Airlines Mileage Plus
- Fleet size: 10
- Destinations: 4
- Parent company: WestAir Holdings

North Pacific Airlines (NPA) was a commuter air carrier formed in 1987 which operated scheduled passenger service on behalf of United Airlines via a code sharing agreement as a United Express carrier initially from the Seattle–Tacoma International Airport (SEA) to three destinations in Washington state and also to Portland, Oregon.

By 1989, the airline had expanded its route network and was serving fifteen destinations located in Idaho, Montana, Oregon and Washington state (see destination list below).

In 1991, the airline, which was owned by WestAir Holding, Inc., was merged with WestAir Commuter Airlines which operated flights in California and other states as a United Express carrier. WestAir Commuter Airlines was also owned by the WestAir Holding corporation.

Another commuter air carrier which used the North Pacific Airlines name operated in Alaska as NPA from the early to mid-1980s.

== Destinations in 1989 ==
According to the Official Airline Guide (OAG), North Pacific Airlines was operating United Express service with British Aerospace BAe Jetstream 31 and Embraer EMB-120 Brasilia propjets to the following destinations in late 1989:

- Bellingham, WA
- Boise, ID
- Eugene, OR
- Kalispell, MT
- Lewiston, ID
- Medford, OR
- Missoula, MT
- Pasco, WA
- Portland, OR (PDX) - hub
- Pullman, WA
- Redmond, OR
- Seattle/Tacoma, WA (SEA) - hub
- Spokane, WA
- Wenatchee, WA
- Yakima, WA

== Fleet ==
North Pacific Airlines fleet
Aircraft	Total	Passengers	Notes
British Aerospace BAe Jetstream 31	10	19	Options held for 30 additional aircraft
Embraer EMB-120 Brasilia	5	30

== See also ==
- List of defunct airlines of the United States
