= British Aerospace Jetstream =

Series of regional airliner and executive transport aircraft

Jetstream
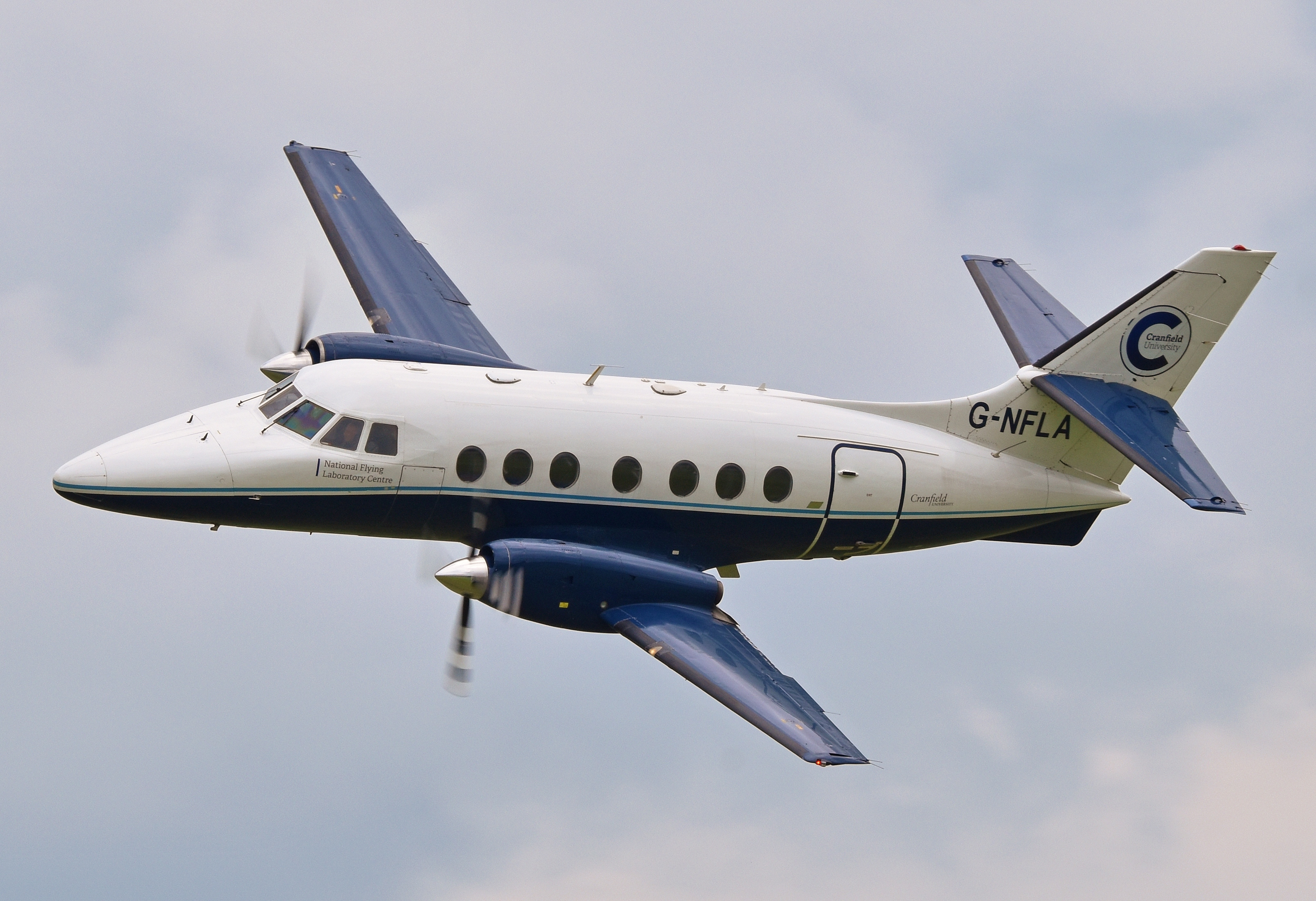

General information
- Type: Regional airliner
- National origin: United Kingdom
- Manufacturer: British Aerospace
- Status: In service
- Primary users: Pascan Aviation AIS Airlines; FlyPelican
- Number built: 492

History
- Manufactured: 1980-1993
- Introduction date: 29 June 1982
- First flight: 28 March 1980
- Developed from: Handley Page Jetstream
- Developed into: British Aerospace Jetstream 41

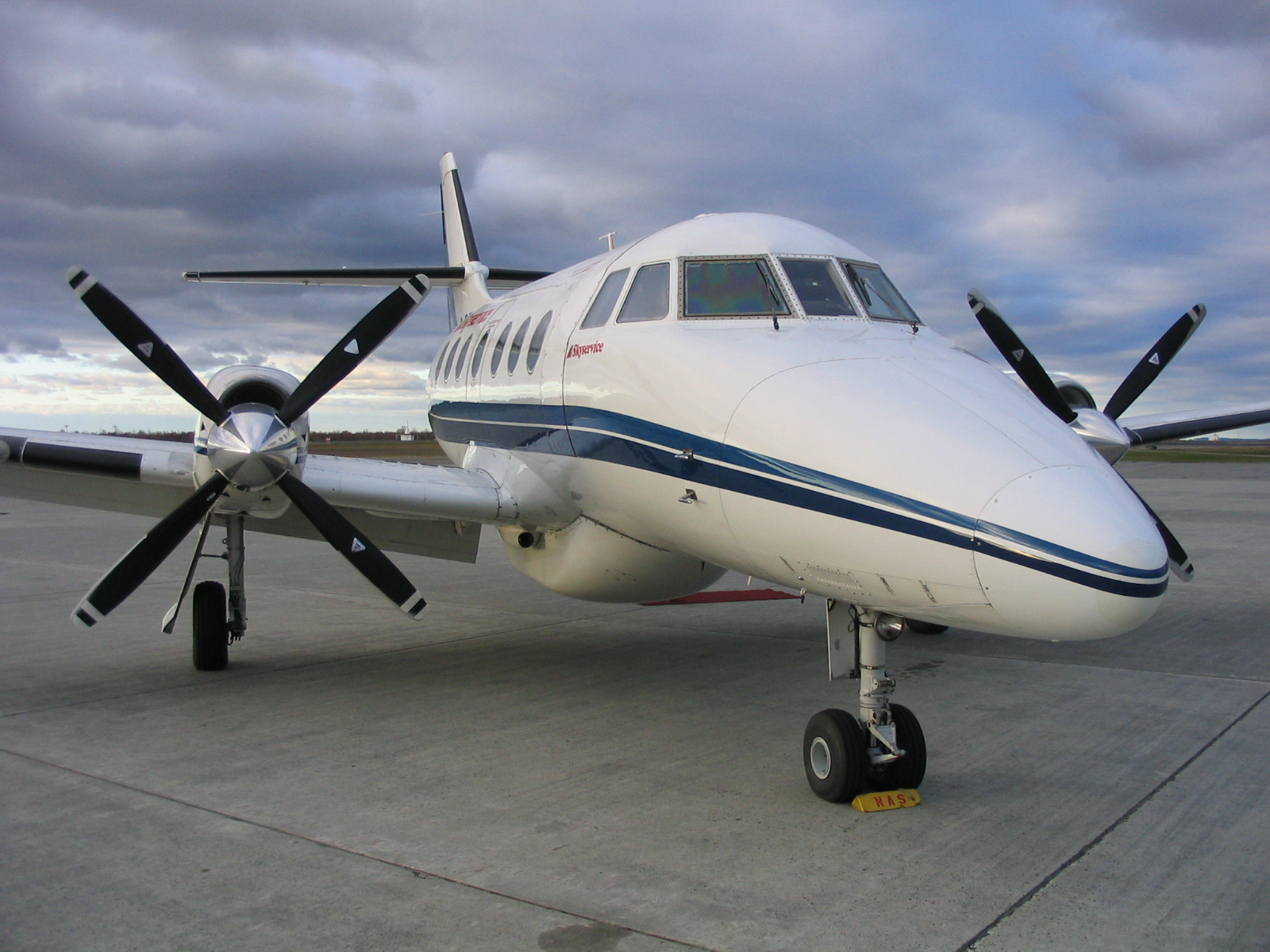
C-GEOC at Sudbury, Ontario, Canada

The British Aerospace Jetstream is a small twin turboprop airliner, with a pressurised fuselage, developed as the Jetstream 31 from the earlier Handley Page Jetstream. A larger version of the Jetstream was also manufactured, the British Aerospace Jetstream 41.

== Development ==
Scottish Aviation had taken over production of the original Jetstream design from Handley Page, and when it was nationalised along with other British companies into British Aerospace (later BAE Systems) in 1978, British Aerospace decided the design was worth further development, and started work on a "Mark 3" Jetstream. As with the earlier 3M version for the USAF, the new version was re-engined with newer Garrett turboprops (now Honeywell TPE331) which offered more power (flat rated to 1,020 shp/760 kW with a thermodynamic limit of 1,100 shp/820 kW) and longer overhaul intervals over the original Turbomeca Astazou engines. This allowed the aircraft to be offered in an 18-seat option (six rows, 2+1), with an offset aisle, and with a water methanol option for the engine to allow the ability to operate at maximum load from a greater range of airfields, particularly in the continental United States and Australia.

The result was the Jetstream 31, which first flew on 28 March 1980, being certificated in the UK on 29 June 1982. The new version proved to be as popular as Handley Page hoped the original model would be, and several hundred 31s were built during the 1980s. In 1985, a further engine upgrade was planned, which flew in 1988 as the Jetstream Super 31, also known as the Jetstream 32. Production continued until 1993, by which time 386 31/32s had been produced. Four Jetstream 31s were ordered for the Royal Navy in 1985 as radar observer trainers, the Jetstream T.3, but were later used for VIP transport.

In 1993, British Aerospace adopted the Jetstream name as its brand name for all twin turboprop aircraft. Besides the Jetstream 31 and Jetstream 32, it built the related Jetstream 41 and the unrelated, but co-branded BAe ATP/Jetstream 61. The Jetstream 61 name was never used in service, and retained its "ATP" marketing name. The company also proposed but never built the Jetstream 51 and Jetstream 71.

== Variants ==
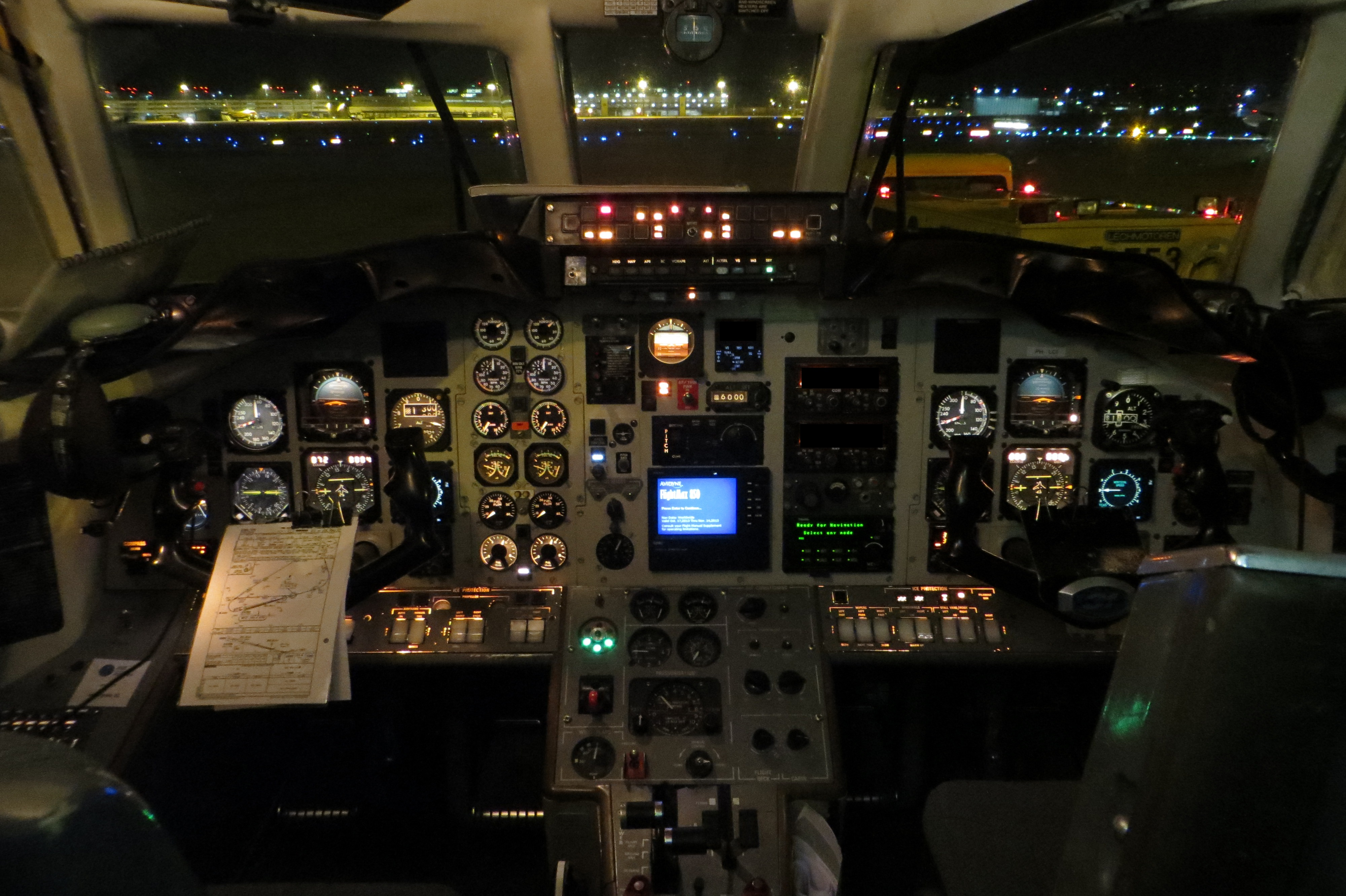
Cockpit of a Jetstream 31

- Jetstream 31 Airliner: 18/19 passenger commuter airliner.
- Jetstream 31 Corporate: 12-passenger executive transport aircraft.
- Jetstream 31EP: Enhanced performance.
- Jetstream 31EZ: EEZ or maritime patrol version.
- Jetstream Executive Shuttle: 12-seat executive transport aircraft.
- Jetstream 31 Special: Utility transport aircraft.
- Jetstream 32EP: Enhanced performance, 19-passenger.
- Jetstream QC (Quick Change)
- Jetstream 41: a stretched version of the popular Jetstream 31

== Operators ==
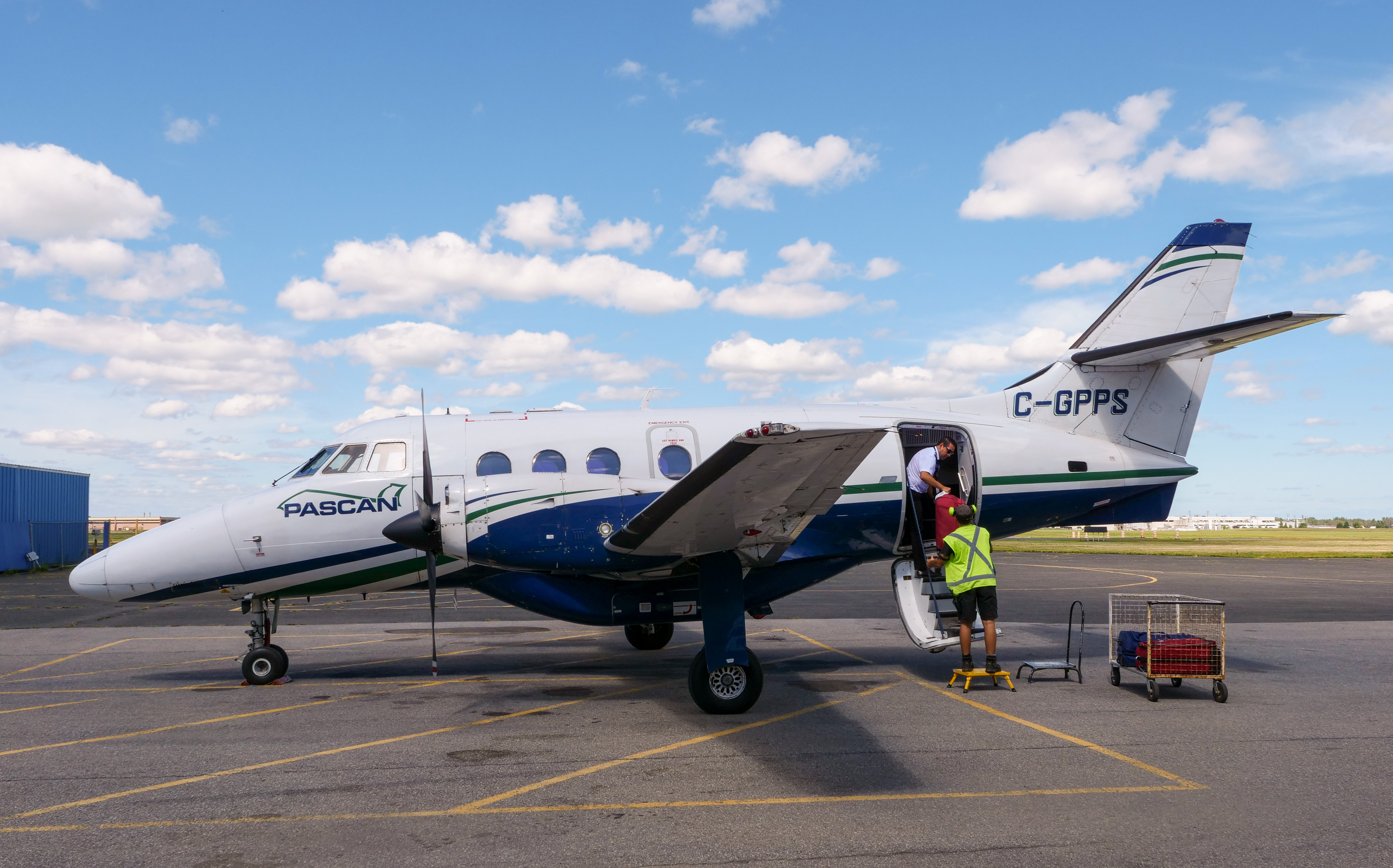
A Pascan Bae Jetstream 32 at Aéroport Montréal Saint-Hubert Longueuil

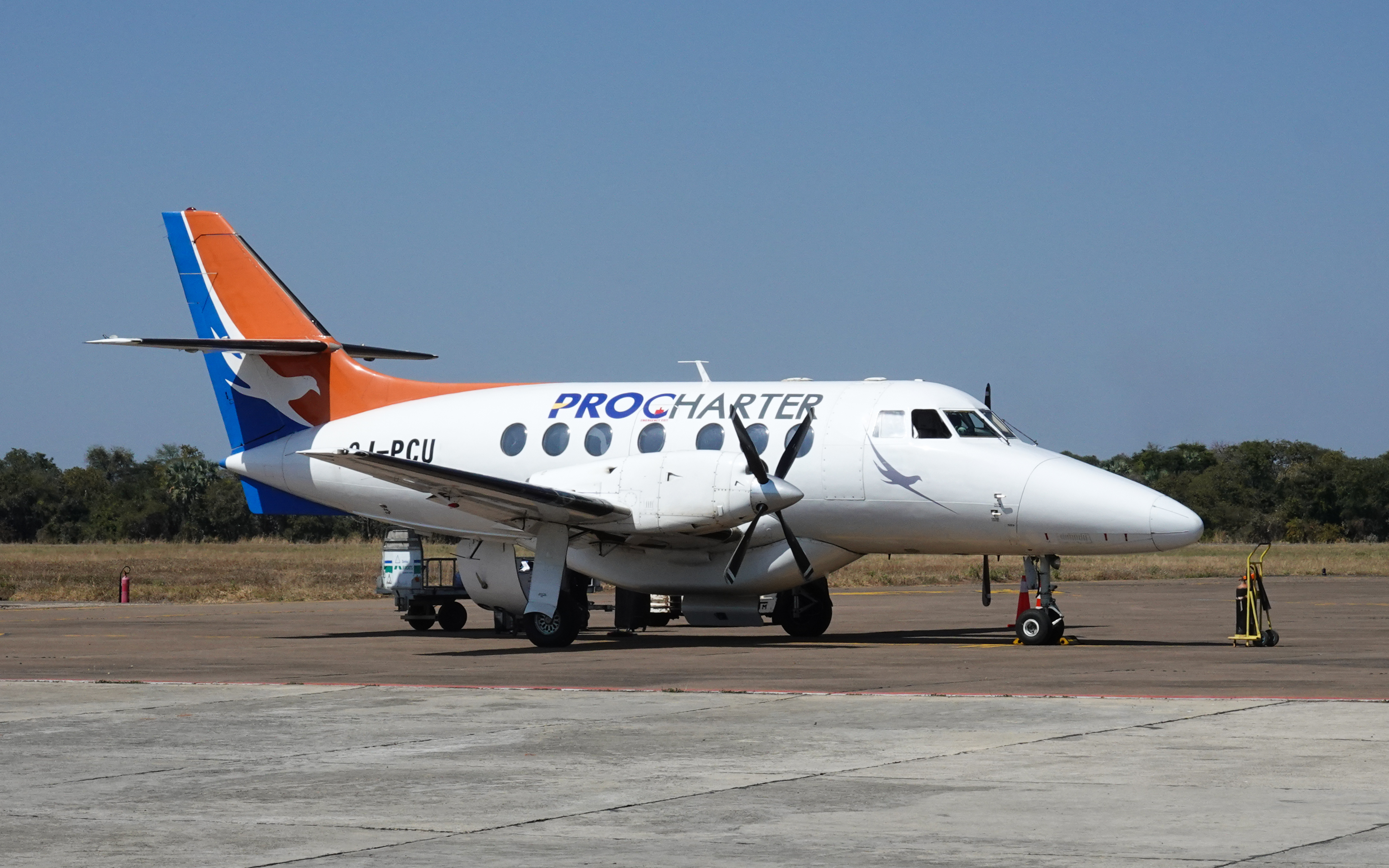
ProCharter Zambia 9J-PCU at Mfuwe Airport

In July 2019, 70 Jetstream 31s were in airline service: 49 in the Americas, 15 in Europe, 5 in Asia-Pacific and 1 in Africa. Airline operators with five or more aircraft were:

- Northwestern Air
- Pascan Aviation
- SARPA
- AIS Airlines
- Transmandu
- FlyPelican

== Accidents and incidents ==
- On 26 May 1987, a Continental Express flight, operated by Air New Orleans as flight 2962 (registration N331CY), crash landed just after takeoff from New Orleans International Airport. The plane crashed into eight lanes of traffic and subsequently injured two persons on the ground. All 11 occupants survived. The cause of the crash was attributed to pilot error, including failing to follow checklists.
- On 26 December 1989, United Express Flight 2415 operated by N410UE of North Pacific Airlines crashed short of the runway at Tri-Cities Airport, Washington, USA. The crew executed an excessively steep and unstabilized ILS approach. That approach, along with improper air traffic control commands and aircraft icing, caused the aircraft to stall. Both crew members and all four passengers were killed.
- On 12 March 1992, a repositioning USAir Express flight operated by CC Air Jetstream 31 crashed on landing at McGhee Tyson Airport near Knoxville, Tennessee after the pilot failed to lower the landing gear. There were no passengers aboard, but the two crew members were killed.
- On 1 December 1993, Northwest Airlink Flight 5719 had a controlled flight into terrain killing all 18 occupants.
- On 13 December 1994, Flagship Airlines Flight 3379 stalled and crashed while on approach to Raleigh-Durham International Airport in the United States, killing 13 of the 18 passengers and both crewmembers. The captain mistakenly thought that an engine had failed and decided to abandon the landing approach, then lost control of the aircraft.
- On 21 May 2000, an East Coast Aviation Services Jetstream (N16EJ) crashed into terrain after running out of fuel on the flight's second approach into Wilkes-Barre/Scranton International Airport, killing all 19 occupants.
- On 8 July 2000, Aerocaribe Flight 7831 crashed into a mountainous area as the aircraft was on approach into Villahermosa International Airport and killed all 19 passengers and crew.
- On 19 October 2004, Corporate Airlines Flight 5966 crashed on approach to Kirksville Regional Airport killing 13 out of 15 passengers and crew. The NTSB stated that pilot error was the cause of the crash.
- On 18 November 2004, Venezolana Flight 213 crashed into a fire station on landing at Simón Bolívar International Airport (Venezuela) after a flight from Juan Pablo Perez Alfonso Airport. Four passengers were killed out of 21 passengers and crew.
- On 8 February 2008, Eagle Airways Flight 2279 was hijacked by a passenger over New Zealand just after taking off from Woodbourne Airport. The pilot managed to restrain the hijacker eventually and the aircraft landed safely at Christchurch International Airport. The two pilots and one passenger were injured in the hijacking.
- On 8 March 2012, BAe Jetstream 3102 G-CCPW of Links Air, operating Manx2 Flight 302 from Leeds Bradford Airport, United Kingdom to Ronaldsway Airport, Isle of Man, departed the runway on landing at Ronaldsway. The aircraft was substantially damaged when the starboard undercarriage collapsed. There were no injuries amongst the twelve passengers and two crew.
- Following the 8 March 2012 crash, the same BAe Jetstream 3102 suffered a similar incident, again operated by Links Air under a new registration, when it crashed at Doncaster's Robin Hood Airport on a flight from Belfast on 15 August 2014. This further incident came after reported problems with its undercarriage while landing. The single passenger was taken to hospital for reported minor injuries.
- On 12 October 2014, an engine of a Jetstream 32 aircraft belonging to Air Century Airlines caught fire while landing after a charter flight from Luis Munoz Marin International Airport in Puerto Rico to Puntacana international airport in the Dominican Republic. The aircraft was destroyed in the subsequent fire. There were no injuries among the 13 passengers and two crew members on the flight.
- On 23 January 2024, a Jetstream aircraft operating as Northwestern Air Flight 738 crashed just after takeoff 500 meters from the runway of Fort Smith Airport while carrying out a charter flight to the Diavik Diamond Mine on behalf of Rio Tinto. Of the 7 people on board, 4 passengers and 2 crew were killed. 1 passenger survived and was transported to hospital in Yellowknife, N.W.T.
- On 17 March 2025, a Jetstream 32 under a charter flight operating as Aerolínea Lanhsa Flight 018 crashed into water less than half a mile from the runway, killing 13 of the 18 occupants on board.

== Specifications (Jetstream 31) ==
Data from Jane's All the World's Aircraft, 1988–1989

General characteristics

- Crew: 2
- Capacity: 19 passengers
- Length: 47 ft 1.75 in (14.3701 m)
- Wingspan: 52 ft 0 in (15.85 m)
- Height: 17 ft 5.5 in (5.321 m)
- Wing area: 271 sq ft (25.2 m^{2})
- Airfoil: root: NACA 63A418; tip: NACA 63A412
- Empty weight: 9,613 lb (4,360 kg)
- Max takeoff weight: 15,332 lb (6,954 kg)
- Powerplant: 2 × Garrett TPE331-10UG turboprop engines, 940 shp (700 kW) each
- Propellers: 4-bladed constant-speed propellers

Performance

- Maximum speed: 263 kn (303 mph, 487 km/h)
- Cruise speed: 230 kn (260 mph, 430 km/h)
- Stall speed: 86 kn (99 mph, 159 km/h)
- Range: 680 nmi (780 mi, 1,260 km)
- Service ceiling: 25,000 ft (7,600 m)
- Rate of climb: 2,080 ft/min (10.6 m/s)
- Wing loading: 56.6 lb/sq ft (276 kg/m^{2})
- Power/mass: 0.123 hp/lb (0.202 kW/kg)

== See also ==
Related development

- British Aerospace Jetstream 41

Aircraft of comparable role, configuration, and era

- Beechcraft 1900
- Dornier 228
- Embraer EMB 110 Bandeirante
- Embraer/FMA CBA 123 Vector
- Fairchild Swearingen Metroliner

Related lists

- List of civil aircraft
