= David Meredith (photographer) =

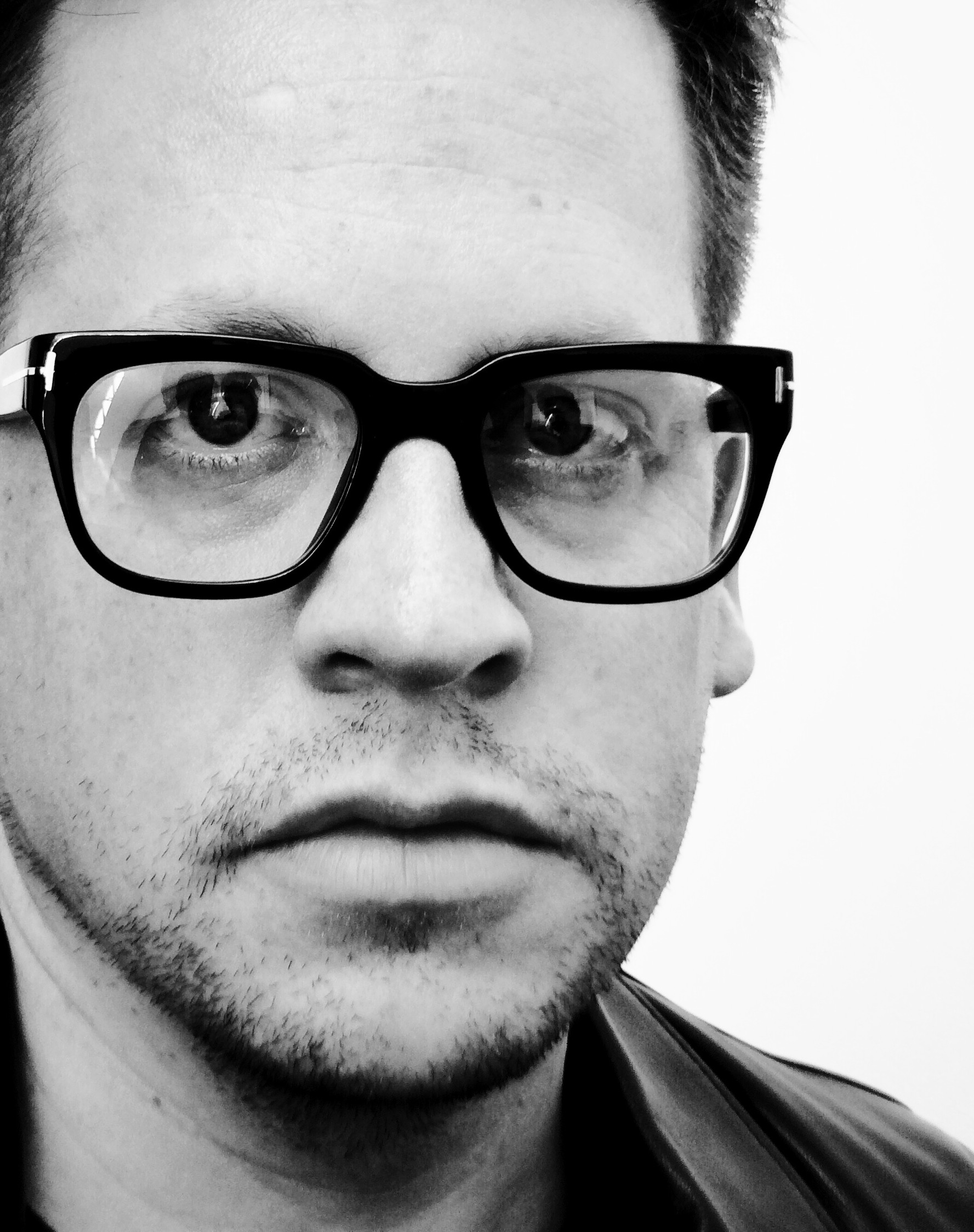
- Born: 1969 (age 56–57)
- Education: Brigham Young University
- Known for: Photography, book design
- Website: davidmeredith.com

David Meredith (born 1969) is an American photographer and graphic designer

== Career ==
Meredith attended Brigham Young University, and also worked with one of his professors, Adrian Pulfer, in a graphic design studio in Salt Lake City. In 1997, David relocated to New York, and worked as an assistant to photographers Hans Gissinger and Rodney Smith. He then went to work for Susan Slover Associates as a graphic designer. After about a year, he was offered a position as a designer for Robert Valentine, where he helped design the launch issues of Real Simple. He also photographed for clients, including Interface and Barbara Barry. Eventually, a co-worker at Valentine left to become an art director for Aveda, and hired David to shoot for the company.

Meredith left Robert Valentine and worked as an independent photographer and designer. It was during this time that David was invited by Gale Towey, the creative director at Martha Stewart Living Omnimedia, to help redesign the logo and overall photography of the Martha Stewart Living magazine.

Soon afterwards, David founded the design firm Pilot NY, and photographed for design clients, building his photography portfolio. Book design has been his most award-winning work, especially designing for fellow photographers Rodney Smith and Andrew Zuckerman.

Most recently, Meredith partnered with Barbara Barry to publish Around Beauty. He designed the book and took all of its photographs.

In 2014, Meredith was juror for the 2012 Communication Arts Photography Annual.

Meredith's design clients include Apple, McGuire/Kohler, Henredon, Barbara Barry, and Anthropologie. As a photographer, he is represented by Cornelia Adams, and clients include Aveda, Anthropologie, Target, Nike, Ralph Lauren, Real Simple, and Martha Stewart.

Meredith was an adjunct professor at Brigham Young University, teaching design and photography. He currently resides in California.

== Books ==
=== Books designed by David Meredith ===
- The Book of Books, by Rodney Smith and Walter Thomas, 2005. Communication Arts Award of Excellence, Self-Promo, 2006
- Creature by Andrew Zuckerman, 2007. Amazon Best of the Month, December 2007. ONE SHOW Design Bronze Pencil, 2008 Communication Arts Award of Excellence, Book Design, 2008
- Bird by Andrew Zuckerman, 2009. Communication Arts Award of Excellence, Book Design, 2010
- The End by Rodney Smith and Walter Thomas, 2009. Communication Arts Award of Excellence, Book Design, 2010 Type Directors' Club Award for Typographic Excellence, Judge's Choice, 2010. Art Directors' Club SILVER Award, Book Design, 2010. Mohawk Paper, Best of Show, 2011
- Music by Andrew Zuckerman, 2010
- Wisdom by Andrew Zuckerman, 2011
- Flower by Andrew Zuckerman, 2012

=== Books designed and illustrated David Meredith ===
- Around Beauty by Barbara Barry, David Meredith, and Dominique Browning, 2012.
