= Jay Ramsdell =

American basketball executive (1964–1989)

- Born: January 30, 1964; Bar Harbor, Maine, U.S.
- Died: July 19, 1989 (aged 25); Sioux City, Iowa, U.S.
- Occupation: Commissioner of the Continental Basketball Association

Jay L. Ramsdell Jr. (January 30, 1964 – July 19, 1989) was the commissioner of the Continental Basketball Association (CBA), a professional men's basketball league in the United States, from 1988 until his death.

== Early life ==
Ramsdell was born on January 30, 1964, in Bar Harbor, Maine, to Jay Sr. and Linda Ramsdell. He attended Mount Desert Island High School.

== Continental Basketball Association ==
As a ninth-grade student in 1978, Ramsdell interviewed the owner of a new CBA expansion team, the Maine Lumberjacks, for an article in his high-school newspaper. The owner was so impressed that he invited Ramsdell to help the team on opening night at the scorer's table; by the end of the game, he was the statistics crew chief. Within a week, Ramsdell had assumed the role of the team's director of public relations.

Ramsdell remained with the Lumberjacks until his high-school graduation in 1982 when he was hired by CBA commissioner Jim Drucker as the league's administrative assistant. Within a year, he was the league's director of operations.

He returned to Bangor, Maine to serve as the general manager for the Maine Windjammers in 1985–86. After that franchise folded after one season, at the age of 20, Ramsdell returned to the CBA front office as deputy commissioner.

With the resignation of commissioner Mike Storen in 1988, Ramsdell became the youngest commissioner in the history of professional sports when he assumed the position at the age of 24.

== Death and legacy ==
Ramsdell and deputy commissioner Jerry Schemmel were aboard United Airlines Flight 232 on July 19, 1989, as they traveled from league headquarters in Denver to the player draft in Columbus, Ohio. The plane crash-landed in Sioux City, Iowa, after losing all hydraulics. Ramsdell was among the 112 passengers who were killed, while Schemmel survived.

In 1989, the CBA league championship trophy was named the Jay Ramsdell Trophy to honor his memory. Ramsdell was posthumously inducted into the Maine Basketball Hall of Fame in 2019.
