= Gissinger =

Gissinger is a surname. Notable people with the surname include:

- Andrew Gissinger (1959–2019), American football player and CEO
- Hans Gissinger, Swiss photographer
