= Dennis Nielsen =

American politician

- Born: February 5, 1947
- Died: September 23, 2023 (aged 76)
- Military career
- Allegiance: United States
- Branch: United States Air Force
- Service years: 1967–2002
- Rank: Colonel
- Commands: Air National Guard

Dennis Dean Nielsen (February 5, 1947 – September 23, 2023) was a retired United States Air Force Colonel who was most widely known for having participated in rescue effort of the United Airlines Flight 232 crash in Sioux City, Iowa in 1989. Born in Shelby, Iowa on February 5, 1947, he lived in the small town of Middlesex, North Carolina since retiring from the Air National Guard in 2002.

== United Airlines Flight 232 ==
On July 19, 1989, United Airlines Flight 232 made an emergency crash-landing in Sioux City, Iowa, killing 112 people on board, 44 minutes after suffering a catastrophic failure of its tail-mounted engine, which led to the loss of many flight controls. Dennis Nielsen had been serving with the United States Air Force since 1967 and the Iowa Air National Guard since 1972. He was one of 285 airmen of the Air National Guard who was on duty at Sioux Gateway Airport when the crash occurred, and he was well known for carrying Spencer Bailey, a baby on board the flight, to safety.

== Political career ==
After his military retirement, he has attempted to be elected to various offices in North Carolina. In 2004, he ran as a Republican against Democratic state senator A. B. Swindell; in 2006, he ran unsuccessfully in the primary for state House of Representatives; and in the 2008 primary elections, he attempted to become the Democratic candidate for Governor of North Carolina, opposing the sitting Lieutenant Governor, Beverly Perdue and the State Treasurer, Richard H. Moore. In the elections, Nielsen came last, receiving 60,000 of the 1.3 million votes cast. Beverly Perdue eventually became the new governor, narrowly beating Republican Pat McCrory (who became governor after Perdue in 2013).

=== Campaign platform ===
In his 2008 campaign, Nielsen advocated the elimination of property tax for those over 65 years of age with an annual adjusted gross income of less than $40,000; he wanted to give tax credits to parents who home-schooled or sent their children to private schools; he proposed the creation of citizen groups that inspected state government activities on behalf of the governor; he wanted much more liberal gun laws in North Carolina; he wanted to remove vehicle inspections in North Carolina; and he promised to prosecute any employer who hired illegal immigrants, didn't submit income taxes and social security from their employees, and possibly also those who didn't pay their employees minimum wage.

== In popular culture ==
- American actor John M. Jackson portrayed Dennis Nielsen in the TV film A Thousand Heroes (1992).

== See also ==
- 2008 North Carolina gubernatorial election
