= David Meredith =

David Meredith may refer to:

- David Meredith (photographer)
- David Meredith (minister)
- David Lloyd Meredith, English actor
