= Wide chord =

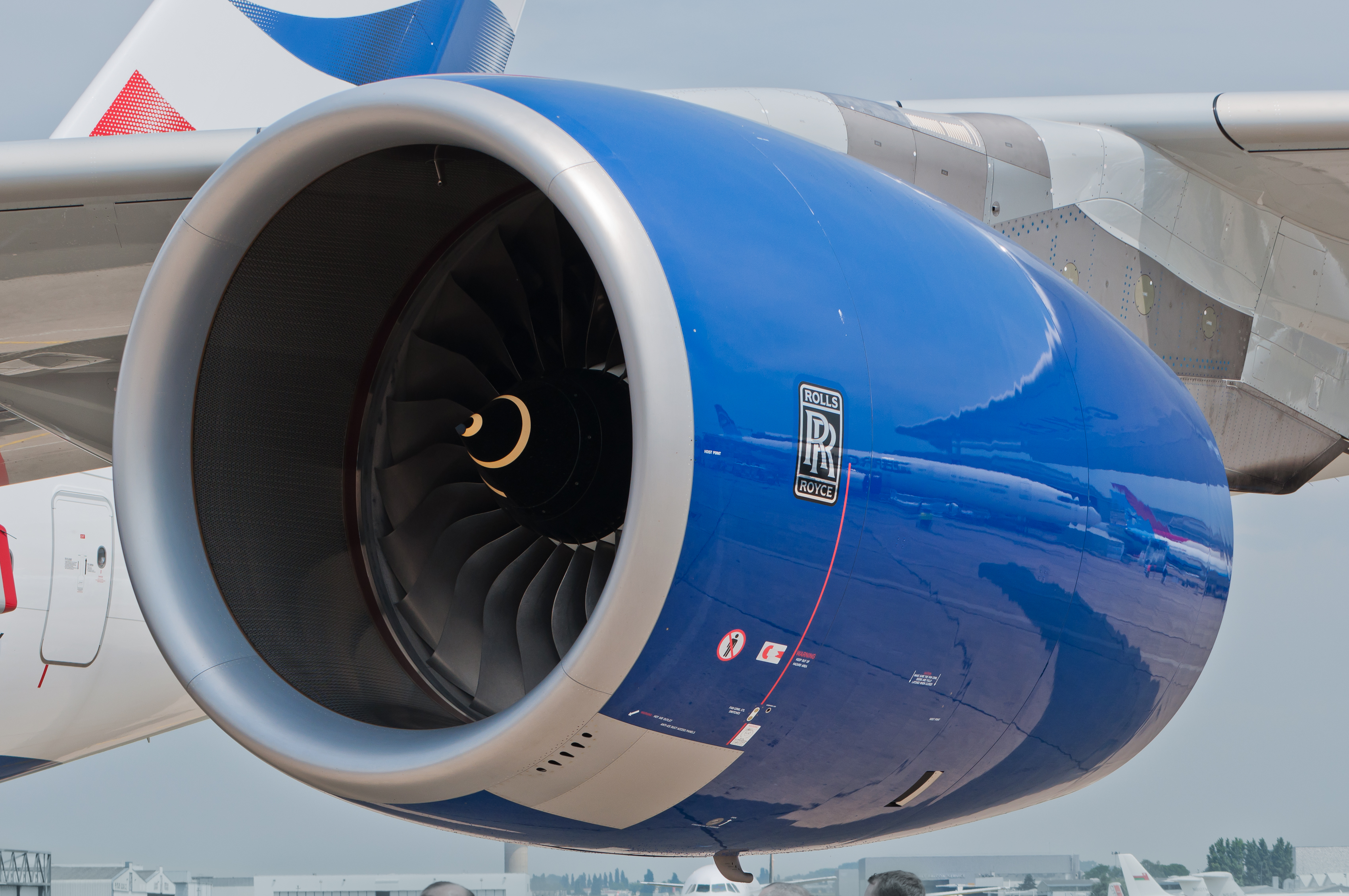
The wide chord fan on a Rolls-Royce Trent 970B- 84 installed on a British Airways Airbus A380

Wide chord describes the fan blades on certain turbofan engines that have a blade design with a specific geometry - In layman's terms, they would be described as having wider blades than other jet engines. The technology was pioneered by Geoff Wilde at Rolls-Royce in the 1970s.

== Overview ==
The main fan on a jet engine consists of a number of aerofoils mounted at the rotational center on the fan disk, and as the engine core rotates the fan blades accelerate an air mass and create the force to move forward which gives thrust (in accordance with Newton's third law).

In theory the larger the fan diameter (the line from the tip of one fanblade to its opposite member) the greater the thrust. In practical applications, fan size is limited by the weight, the space available around the aircraft and by the increased drag (resistance) generated by the larger frontal area.

In the race to achieve better fuel economy, more thrust and less weight & noise from jet engines, designers have refined the blade design and materials to extract more thrust for any given fan disk area. One significant improvement is to make blade chords wider and, more recently, alter the blade geometry to give it a scimitar-like shape. Further refinements include making the blades from a light material such as titanium and to manufacture them with a hollow cross-section.

Modern jet engines such as the Rolls-Royce Trent 900 and the Engine Alliance GP7000, which both power the Airbus A380, are examples of engines with wide-chord fans.

== Key design considerations ==
A wide chord fan has fewer, wider blades compared to the narrower blades on earlier technology fans. The blades are often hollow and made from titanium. The wide-chord fan blade was designed and developed at Rolls-Royce Barnoldswick in Lancashire. The manufacturing process uses superplastic forming, diffusion-bonded technology to achieve a lightweight, strong design.
