= Al Haynes =

American-born airplane pilot (1931–2019)

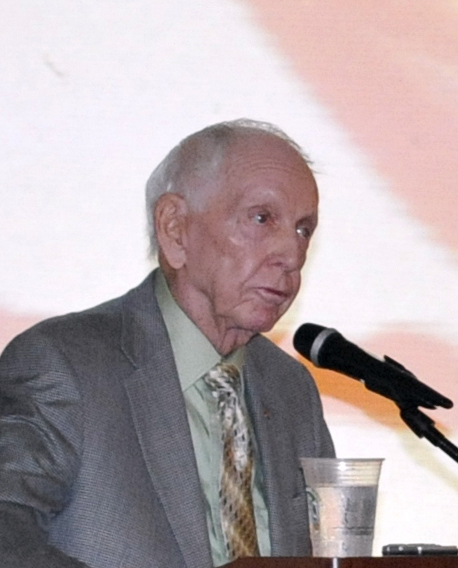
- Haynes in 2012
- Born: Alfred Clair Haynes; August 31, 1931; Paris, Texas
- Died: August 25, 2019 (aged 87); Seattle, Washington
- Occupation: Airline pilot
- Spouse: Darlene Flora Sumovich (m. 1959; died 1999)
- Children: Laurie Haynes-Arguello; Anthony Clair “Tony” Haynes; Daniel Clair “Dan” Haynes
- Parent(s): Herbert Clair Haynes; Fannie Temperance Baker
- Relatives: 3 grandchildren, 1 great-grandchild

Alfred Clair Haynes (August 31, 1931 – August 25, 2019) was an American airline pilot who flew for United Airlines for 35 years. In 1989 he came to international attention as the captain of United Airlines Flight 232, which crashed in Sioux City, Iowa, after suffering a total loss of controls. Having recovered and returned to service as a pilot, Haynes retired from United Airlines in 1991, and subsequently became a public speaker for aviation safety.

== Early life ==
Al Haynes was born on August 31, 1931, at the family home in Paris, Texas. He was the third child born to Herbert Clair Haynes (1896–1972) and Fannie Temperance Baker (1896–1991). His father worked as a district manager of a telephone company and his mother was a homemaker. By 1940, the family relocated to Dallas, Texas, where Haynes attended Woodrow Wilson High School. Haynes graduated from Texas A&M College (now Texas A&M University) prior to joining the United States Marine Corps. He became a first lieutenant and was an instructor pilot. He served until 1956 and then joined United Airlines, which was his employer for the next 35 years. He retired in 1991.

== Career ==
=== Military career ===
Haynes lost his draft deferment while taking a semester off from Texas A&M, while the United States was engaged in the Korean War, and decided to join the U.S. Marine Corps. He spent four years in the Marine Corps, serving as a pilot.

=== United Airlines flying career ===
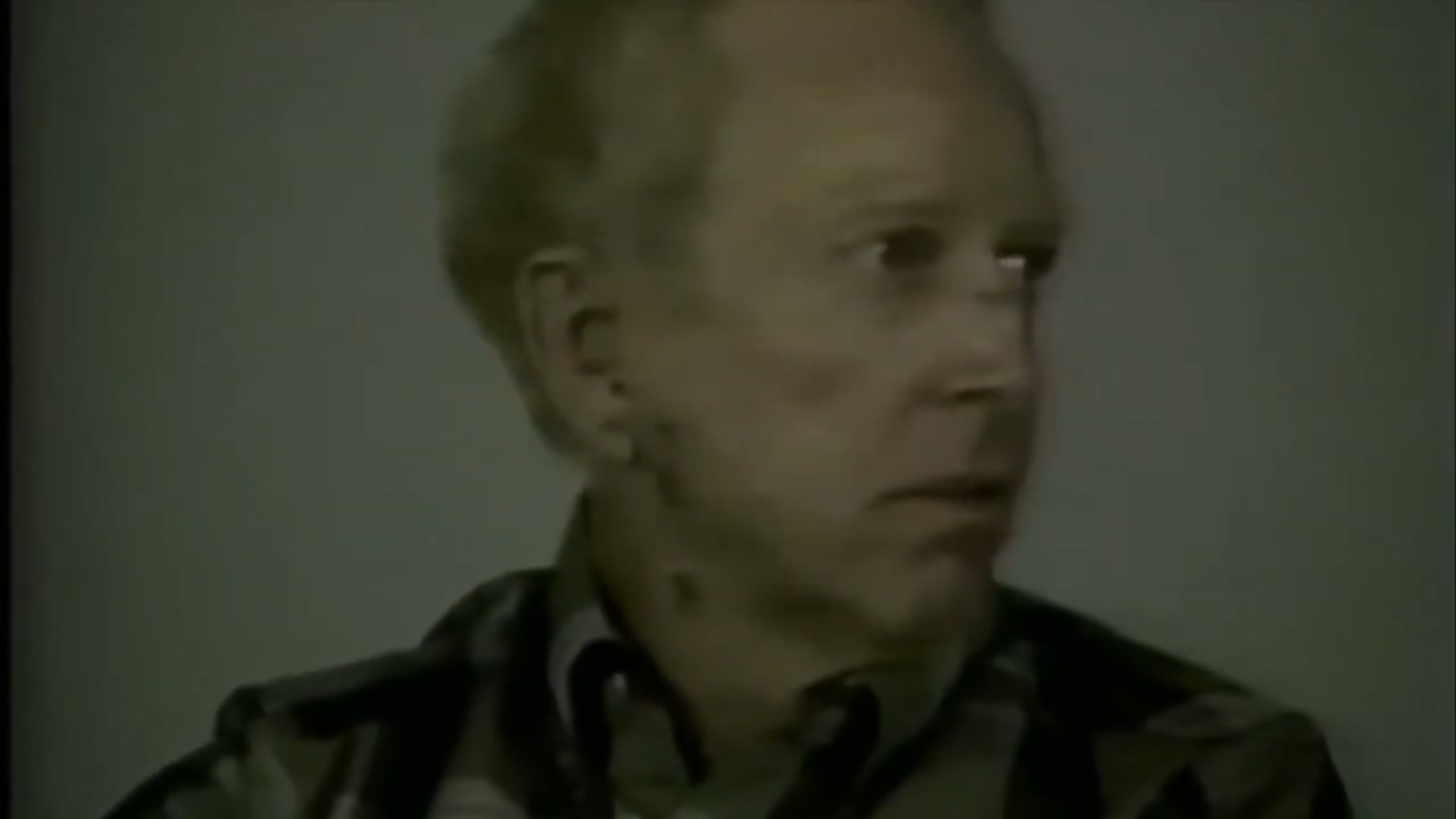
Haynes in 1989 after surviving the crash of Flight 232

In 1956, Haynes joined United Airlines after his wartime service. For most of his career with United Airlines he served as a flight engineer or co-pilot, refusing offers of promotion, because they would have required relocating from Seattle. However, in 1985, he did accept a promotion to captain, because he would be approaching retirement soon, and his retirement pay would be based upon his pay during his last five years.

On July 19, 1989, Haynes was the Captain of United Airlines Flight 232, piloting a DC-10, a large trijet airliner, carrying 296 passengers and crew. The airplane had left Denver for Chicago, with a final destination of Philadelphia, but experienced a catastrophic engine failure in its rear engine (#2), which triggered a loss of hydraulic fluid. Without hydraulic fluid Haynes and his flight crew could not move the airplane's flaps and rudder or almost any other control surfaces.

Without flight controls the airplane began a right descending turn, a tendency that persisted for the rest of the flight. Haynes reduced the thrust on the left engine (#1), allowing differential thrust from the right engine (#3) to level the aircraft. An off-duty pilot, Dennis Edward Fitch, joined Haynes and his co-pilot, William Roy Records, and flight engineer Dudley Joseph Dvorak, on the flight deck.

The airplane was diverted to Sioux City for an emergency landing. With very limited ability to control the airplane, Haynes had difficulty aligning with a runway, reducing speed and landing nose-up. Consequently, the airplane approached the runway at almost twice the desired landing speed, resulting in a very hard landing, with catastrophic damage to the airframe. The airplane then broke into pieces as it slid off the runway, with the remaining fuel bursting into flames. As can be heard in the cockpit flight recording, it was the intervention of Fitch that ultimately got the airplane to the airport.

184 people survived the crash-landing while 32 died of smoke inhalation and 80 died of traumatic injuries. Haynes and his colleagues were trapped in the cockpit. Thirty-five minutes after the crash-landing, rescuers identified the cockpit and rescued the flight crew. Most had minor injuries, apart from Denny Fitch, who almost died, having suffered multiple fractures and other organ injuries.

Haynes believed five factors contributed to the degree of success in Sioux City; luck, communications, preparation, execution, and cooperation.

Haynes resumed flight duty after his recovery.

=== Career after United Airlines ===
According to NPR, "Haynes is widely seen as a hero among aviation experts, akin to Chesley "Sully" Sullenberger and his 'miracle on the Hudson.'"

He was also a volunteer umpire for Little League Baseball for more than 33 years and a stadium announcer for high school football for more than 25 years. He was an umpire in the 1978 Little League World Series.

He was referred to as a hero, but refused to say he was one. He gave all the credit to the flight attendants, who he believed did not receive enough credit for the work they did.

== Awards ==
- Smithsonian Wall of Honor
- Dr. Earl Weiner Award

== Death ==
Haynes died on August 25, 2019, in a Seattle hospital after a brief illness, six days before his 88th birthday. United Airlines issued a statement thanking him for "his exceptional efforts aboard Flight UA232".

== In popular culture ==
- American actor Charlton Heston portrayed Captain Al Haynes in the TV film A Thousand Heroes (1992).
- Captain Al Haynes appeared in the documentary Seconds from Disaster Season 2: Episode 7 (2005) called "Crash Landing at Sioux City" as well as the episode "Crisis in the Cockpit" (Season 2, Episode 1) of Why Planes Crash.
- Canadian actor Stewart Arnott portrayed Captain Al Haynes in the Canadian TV series Mayday Season 11: Episode 13 (2012) called "Impossible Landing" and Air Crash Investigation Special Report Season 3: Episode 8 (2020) called "Courage in the Cockpit".
