= United Airlines Flight 232 =

1989 aviation accident in Iowa

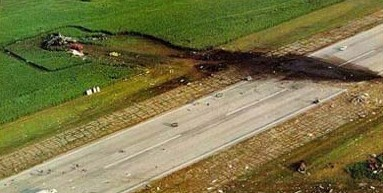
- Wreckage of the aircraft

Accident
- Date: July 19, 1989
- Summary: Uncontained engine failure due to fan disk separation resulting in loss of hydraulics and loss of control
- Site: Sioux Gateway Airport, Sioux City, Iowa, U.S.; 42°25′N 96°23′W

Aircraft
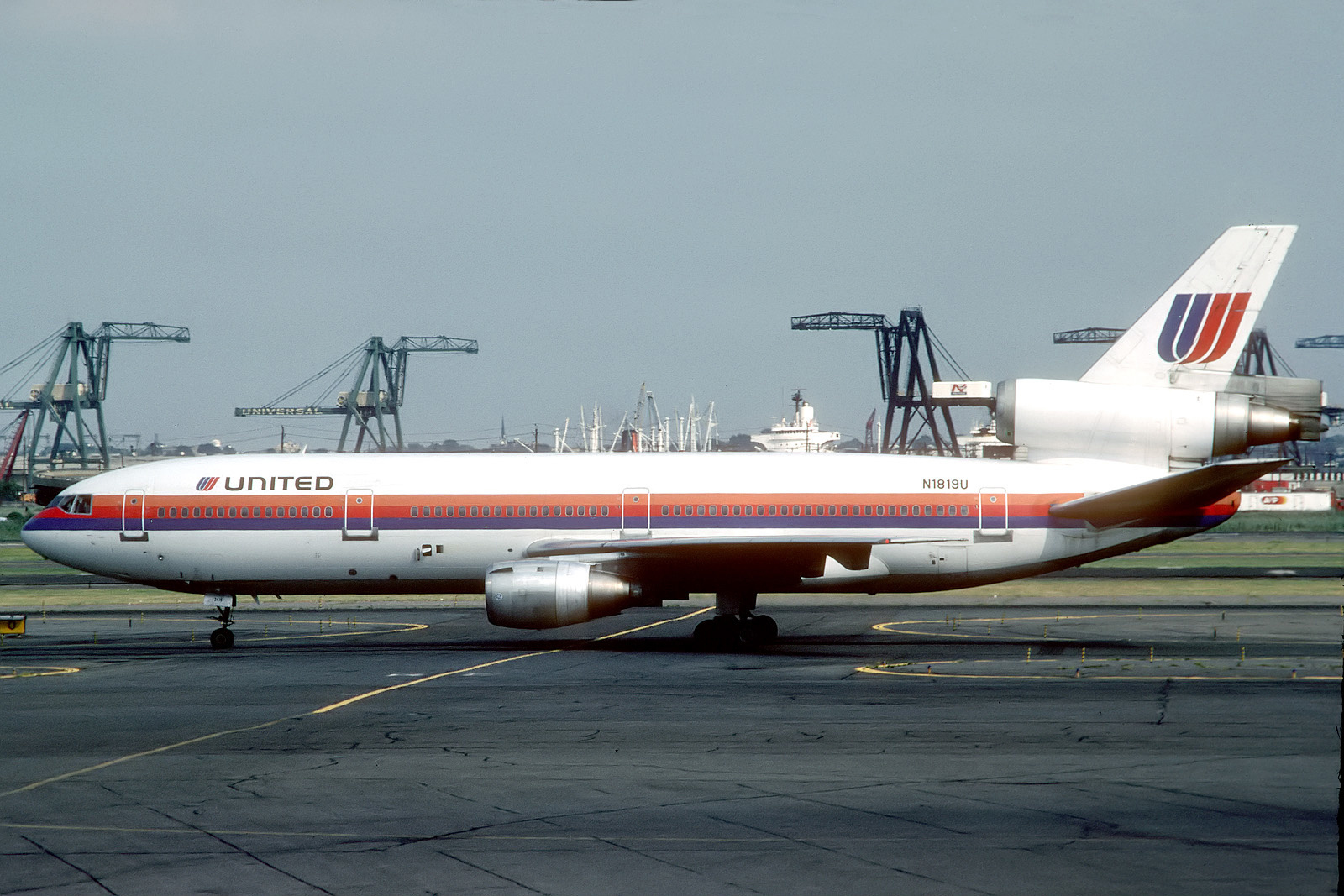
- N1819U, the aircraft involved in the accident, seen in 1980
- Aircraft type: McDonnell Douglas DC-10-10
- Operator: United Airlines
- IATA flight No.: UA232
- ICAO flight No.: UAL232
- Call sign: UNITED 232 HEAVY
- Registration: N1819U
- Flight origin: Stapleton International Airport, Denver, Colorado, U.S.
- Stopover: O'Hare International Airport, Chicago, Illinois, U.S.
- Destination: Philadelphia International Airport, Philadelphia, Pennsylvania, U.S.
- Occupants: 296
- Passengers: 285
- Crew: 11
- Fatalities: 112 (Note: This figure includes one passenger who died 31 days after the accident. The NTSB explained in its final report that in accordance with 49 CFR 830.2, it classified this passenger as a survivor with "serious" injuries. The regulation legally defines "fatal injury" as an injury resulting in death within 30 days after the accident.)
- Injuries: 171
- Survivors: 184

United Airlines Flight 232 was a regularly scheduled United Airlines flight from Stapleton International Airport in Denver to O'Hare International Airport in Chicago, continuing to Philadelphia International Airport in Philadelphia, United States. On July 19, 1989, the McDonnell Douglas DC-10 serving the flight crash-landed at Sioux Gateway Airport in Sioux City, Iowa, after suffering a catastrophic failure of its tail-mounted engine due to an unnoticed manufacturing defect in the engine's fan disk, which resulted in the loss of all flight controls. Of the 296 passengers and crew on board, 112 died, while 184 people survived. Thirteen passengers were uninjured.

Despite the fatalities, the accident is considered a good example of successful crew resource management, still a relatively new concept at the time. Contributing to the outcome was the crew's decision to recruit the assistance of a company check pilot, on board as a passenger, to assist controlling the aircraft and troubleshooting of the problem the crew was facing. A majority of those aboard survived; experienced test pilots in simulators were unable to reproduce a survivable landing. It has been termed "The Impossible Landing", as it is considered one of the most impressive landings performed in the history of aviation.

== Aircraft ==
The airplane, a McDonnell Douglas DC-10-10 (registration N1819U), was delivered in 1971 and owned by United Airlines since then. Before departure on the flight from Denver on July 19, 1989, the airplane had been operated for a total of 43,401 hours and 16,997 cycles (takeoff-landing pairs). The aircraft was equipped with three General Electric CF6-6D high-bypass turbofan engines produced by General Electric Aircraft Engines (GEAE). The aircraft's No. 2 (tail-mounted) engine had accumulated 42,436 hours and 16,899 cycles of operating time immediately prior to the accident flight.

The DC-10 used three independent hydraulic systems, each powered by one of the aircraft's three engines, to power movement of the aircraft's flight controls. In the event of loss of engine power or primary pump failure, a ram air turbine could provide emergency electrical power for electrically powered auxiliary pumps. These systems were designed to be redundant, such that if two hydraulic systems were inoperable, the one remaining hydraulic system would still permit the full operation and control of the airplane. However, at least one hydraulic system must have fluid present and the ability to hold fluid pressure to control the aircraft. Like other widebody transport aircraft of the time, the DC-10 was not designed to revert to unassisted manual control in the event of total hydraulic failure. The DC-10's hydraulic system was designed and demonstrated to the Federal Aviation Administration (FAA) as compliant with regulations that "no single [engine] failure or malfunction or probable combination of failures will jeopardize the safe operation of the airplane..."

== Crew ==
Flight 232's captain, Al Haynes, 57, had been hired by United Airlines in 1956. He had 29,967 hours of total flight time with United, of which 7,190 were in the DC-10.

Haynes' co-pilot was Bill Records, 48. He estimated that he had 20,000 hours of total flight time. He was hired first by National Airlines in 1969, and had worked for Pan American World Airways after that. He was hired by United in 1985, and had accrued 665 hours as a DC-10 first officer while at United.

Flight engineer (Note: The NTSB's report describes Dvorak as Flight 232's "second officer", but on first use of the term they note that it means the flight engineer.) Dudley Dvorak, 51, was hired by United Airlines in 1986. He estimated that he had about 15,000 hours of total flying time. While working for United, he had accumulated 1,903 hours as a flight engineer in the Boeing 727 and 33 hours as a flight engineer in the DC-10.

Denny Fitch, 46, was a training check pilot who was on Flight 232 as a passenger. He had studied the crash of Japan Air Lines Flight 123 which suffered a total hydraulic system failure and loss of flight controls, and he had practiced similar situations in a flight simulator. He was hired by United in 1968 and he estimated that, prior to working for United, he had accrued at least 1,400 hours of flight time with the Air National Guard, making his total flight time around 23,000 hours. His total DC-10 time with United was 2,987 hours, including 1,943 hours as a flight engineer, 965 hours as a first officer, and 79 hours as a captain.

There were eight flight attendants on board.

== Accident ==
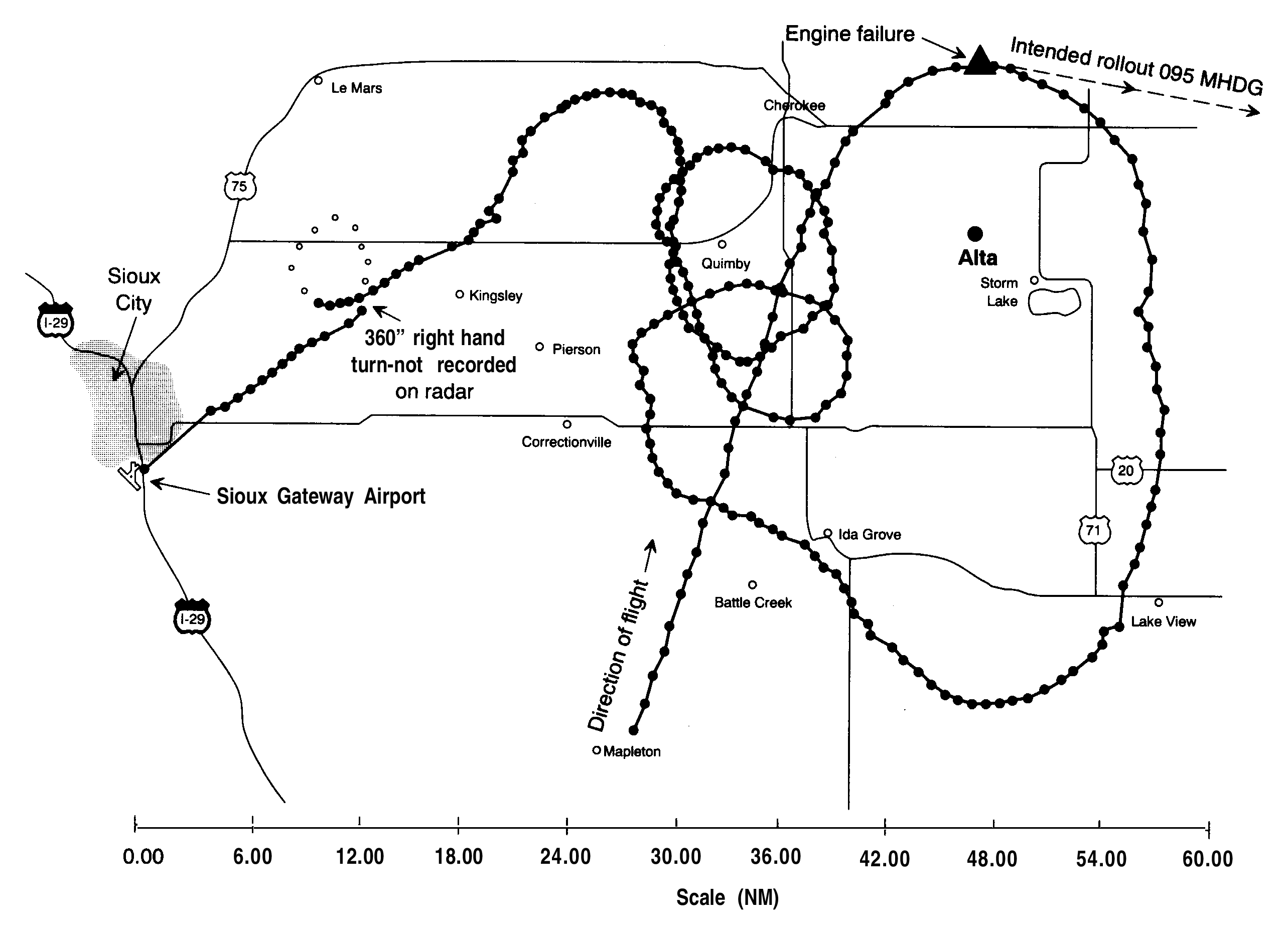
Radar plot of the final hour (approximately) of the plane's flight path, from the NTSB report

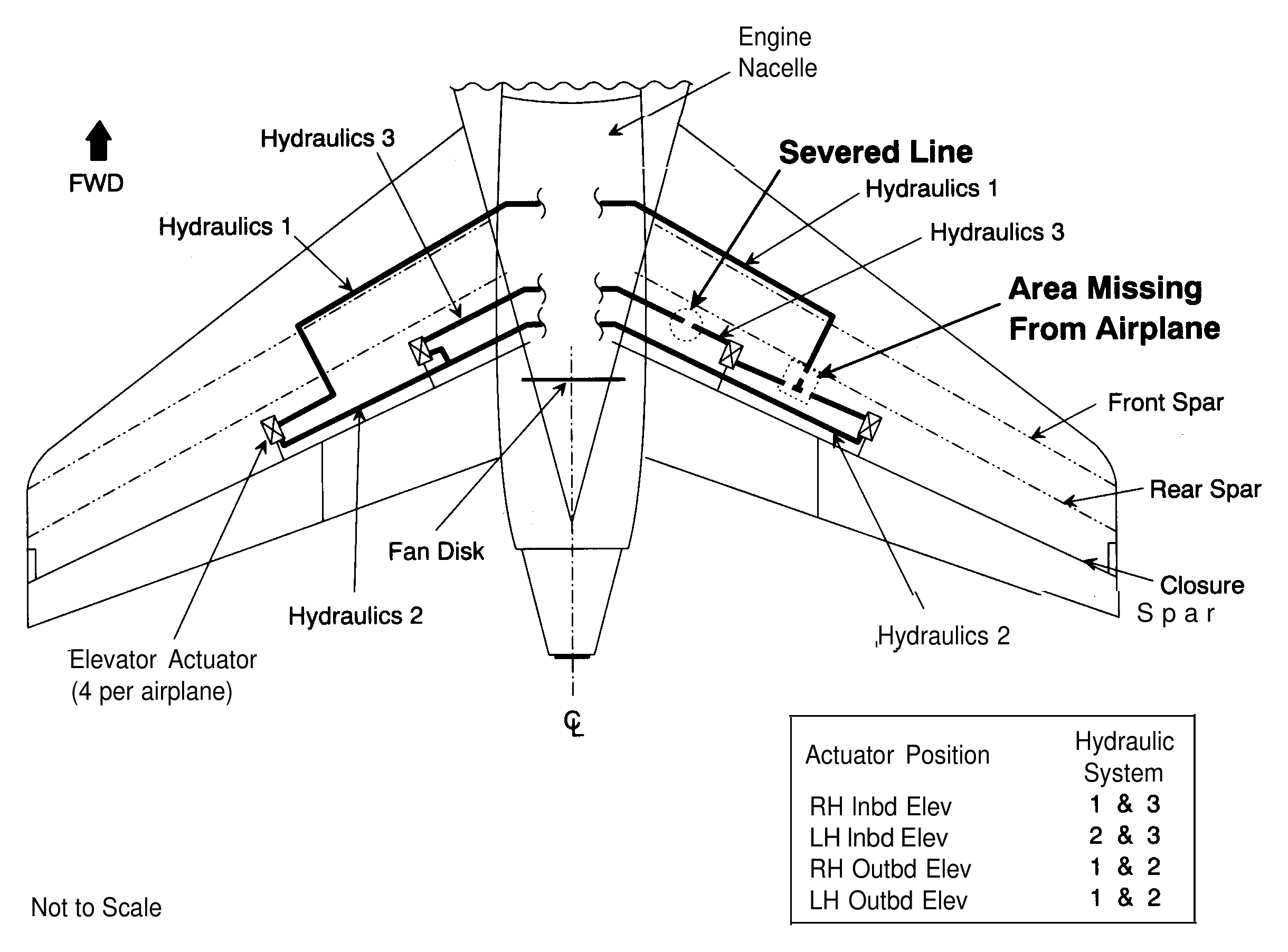
Damage to the rear of the plane, from the NTSB report

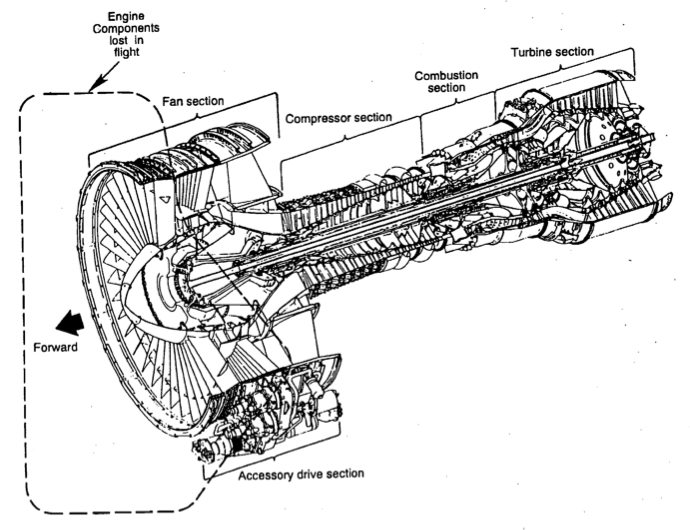
Diagram showing engine components lost in flight, from the NTSB report

=== Takeoff and engine failure ===
Flight 232 departed from Stapleton International Airport in Denver at 14:09 Central Daylight Time, (Note: While Colorado is wholly contained within the Mountain Time Zone, all times in this article are provided in Central Daylight Time, consistent with local time for the crash site in Iowa and the NTSB report.) en route to O'Hare International Airport in Chicago with continuing service to Philadelphia.

At 15:16, while the airplane was making a slight right turn at its cruising altitude of 37,000 feet (11,000 m), the fan disk of its tail-mounted General Electric CF6 engine disintegrated explosively. The uncontained failure resulted in the engine's fan disk departing the aircraft, tearing out components including parts of the No. 2 hydraulic system and supply hoses in the process; these were later found near Alta, Iowa. Engine debris penetrated the aircraft's tail section in numerous places, including the horizontal stabilizer, severing the No. 1 and No. 3 hydraulic system lines where they passed through the horizontal stabilizer.

The pilots felt a jolt, and the autopilot disengaged. As First Officer Records took hold of his control column, Captain Haynes concentrated on the tail engine, the instruments for which indicated it was malfunctioning; he found its throttle and fuel supply controls jammed. At Dvorak's suggestion, a valve for fuel to the tail engine was shut off. This part of the emergency took 14 seconds.

=== Attempts to control the plane ===
Meanwhile, Records found that the airplane did not respond to his control column. Even with the control column turned all the way to the left, commanding maximum left aileron, and pulled all the way back, commanding maximum up elevator – inputs that would never be used together in normal flight – the aircraft was banking to the right with the nose dropping. Haynes attempted to level the aircraft with his own control column, then both Haynes and Records tried using their control columns together, but the aircraft still did not respond. Afraid the aircraft would roll into a completely inverted position (a nearly unrecoverable situation), the crew reduced the left wing-mounted engine to idle and applied maximum power to the right engine. This caused the airplane to level slowly.

While Haynes and Records performed the engine shutdown checklist for the failed engine, Dvorak observed that the gauges for fluid pressure and quantity in all three hydraulic systems were indicating zero. The loss of all hydraulic fluid meant that control surfaces were inoperative. The flight crew deployed the DC-10's air-driven generator in an attempt to restore hydraulic power by powering the auxiliary hydraulic pumps, but this was unsuccessful. The crew contacted United Airlines maintenance personnel via radio, but were told that the possibility of a total loss of hydraulics in a DC-10 was considered so remote that no procedure had been established for such an event.

The airplane was tending to pull right and oscillated slowly vertically in a phugoid cycle – characteristic of planes in which control surface command is lost. With each iteration of the cycle, the aircraft lost about 1,500 feet (460 m) of altitude. Dennis Fitch, an experienced United Airlines captain and DC-10 flight instructor, was among the passengers and volunteered to assist. The message was relayed by senior flight attendant Jan Brown Lohr to the flight crew, who invited Fitch into the cockpit; he began assisting at about 15:29.

Haynes asked Fitch to observe the ailerons through the passenger cabin windows to see if control inputs were having any effect. Fitch reported that the ailerons were not moving at all. Nonetheless, the crew continued to manipulate their control columns for the remainder of the flight, hoping for at least some effect. Haynes then asked Fitch to take control of the throttles so that Haynes could concentrate on his control column. With one throttle in each hand, Fitch was able to mitigate the phugoid cycle and make rough steering adjustments.

Air traffic control (ATC) was contacted and an emergency landing at nearby Sioux Gateway Airport was organized. The conversation was recorded by the airplane's cockpit voice recorder (CVR), including:

Sioux City Approach: "United Two Thirty-Two Heavy, the wind's currently three six zero at one one; three sixty at eleven. You're cleared to land on any runway."

Haynes: "[laughter] Roger. [laughter] You want to be particular and make it a runway, huh?"

ATC asked the crew to make a left turn to keep them clear of the city:

Haynes: "Whatever you do, keep us away from the city."

Haynes later noted, "We were too busy [to be scared]. You must maintain your composure in the airplane, or you will die. You learn that from your first day flying."

=== Crash landing ===
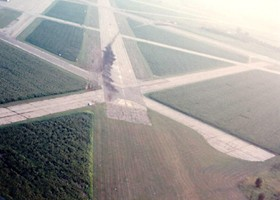
View of the initial touchdown area

As the crew began to prepare for arrival at Sioux Gateway Airport, they questioned whether they should deploy the landing gear or belly-land the aircraft with the gear retracted. They decided that having the landing gear down would provide some shock absorption on impact. The complete hydraulic failure left the landing gear lowering mechanism inoperative. Two options were available to the flight crew. The DC-10 is designed so that if hydraulic pressure to the landing gear is lost, the gear will fall down slightly and rest on the landing gear doors. Placing the regular landing gear handle in the down position will unlock the doors mechanically, and the doors and landing gear will then fall down into place and lock due to gravity. An alternative system is also available using a lever in the cockpit floor to cause the landing gear to fall into position. This lever has the added benefit of unlocking the outboard ailerons, which are not used in high-speed flight and are locked in a neutral position. The crew hoped that there might be some trapped hydraulic fluid in the outboard ailerons and that they might regain some use of flight controls by unlocking them. They elected to extend the gear with the alternative system. Although the gear deployed successfully, no change of the controllability of the aircraft resulted.

Landing was originally planned for 9,000-foot (2,700 m) Runway 31. Difficulties in controlling the aircraft made alignment with the runway almost impossible. While dumping some of the excess fuel, the airplane executed a series of mostly right-hand turns (turning the airplane in this direction was easier) with the intention of aligning with Runway 31. When they finished they were instead aligned with the closed 6,888-foot (2,099 m) Runway 22, and had little ability to maneuver. Runway 22 had been closed permanently a year earlier. Fire trucks had been placed on Runway 22, anticipating a landing on nearby Runway 31, so all the vehicles were quickly moved out of the way before the airplane touched down.

ATC also advised that a four-lane Interstate highway ran north and south just east of the airport, which they could land on if they did not think they could make the runway. Captain Haynes replied that they were passing over the interstate at that time and they would try for the runway instead.

Fitch continued to control the aircraft's descent by adjusting engine thrust. With the loss of all hydraulics, the flaps could not be extended, and since flaps control both the minimum required forward speed and sink rate, the crew was unable to control either the airspeed or the sink rate. On final approach, the aircraft's forward speed was 220 knots (250 mph; 410 km/h) and it had a sink rate of 1,850 feet per minute (9.4 m/s), while a safe landing would require 140 knots (160 mph; 260 km/h) forward speed and 300 feet per minute (1.5 m/s) sink rate. Moments before landing, the roll to the right suddenly worsened significantly and the aircraft began to pitch forward into a dive; Fitch realized this and pushed both throttles to full power in a desperate, last-ditch attempt to level the plane. It was now 16:00. The CVR recorded these final moments:

A screenshot from a video of the accident taken by local news station KTIV

First Officer Records: "Close 'em off."

Captain Haynes: "Left turn, close 'em off."

First Officer Records: "Pull 'em all off."

Captain Fitch: "Nah, I can't pull 'em off or we'll lose it, that's what's turning ya."

First Officer Records: "Okay."

Captain Fitch: "Back, Al!"

Captain Haynes: "Left, left throttle, left, left, left, left, left, left, left, left, left, left, left!"

Ground Proximity Warning System: "Whoop whoop pull up. Whoop whoop pull up. Whoop whoop pull up."

Captain Haynes: "Everybody stay in brace!"

GPWS: "Whoop whoop pull up."

Captain Haynes: "God!"

[Sound of impact]

End of recording.

The engines were not able to respond to Fitch's controls in time to stop the roll, and the airplane struck the ground with its right wing, spilling fuel which ignited immediately. The tail section broke off from the force of the impact, and the rest of the aircraft bounced several times, shedding the landing gear and engine nacelles and breaking the fuselage into several main pieces. At final impact, the right wing was torn off and the main part of the aircraft skidded sideways, rolled over onto its back, and slid to a stop upside-down in a corn field to the right of Runway 22. Witnesses reported that the aircraft "cartwheeled" end-over-end, but the investigation did not confirm this. The reports were due to misinterpretation of the video of the crash that showed the flaming right wing tumbling end-over-end and the intact left wing, still attached to the fuselage, rolling up and over as the fuselage flipped over.

== Injuries and deaths ==
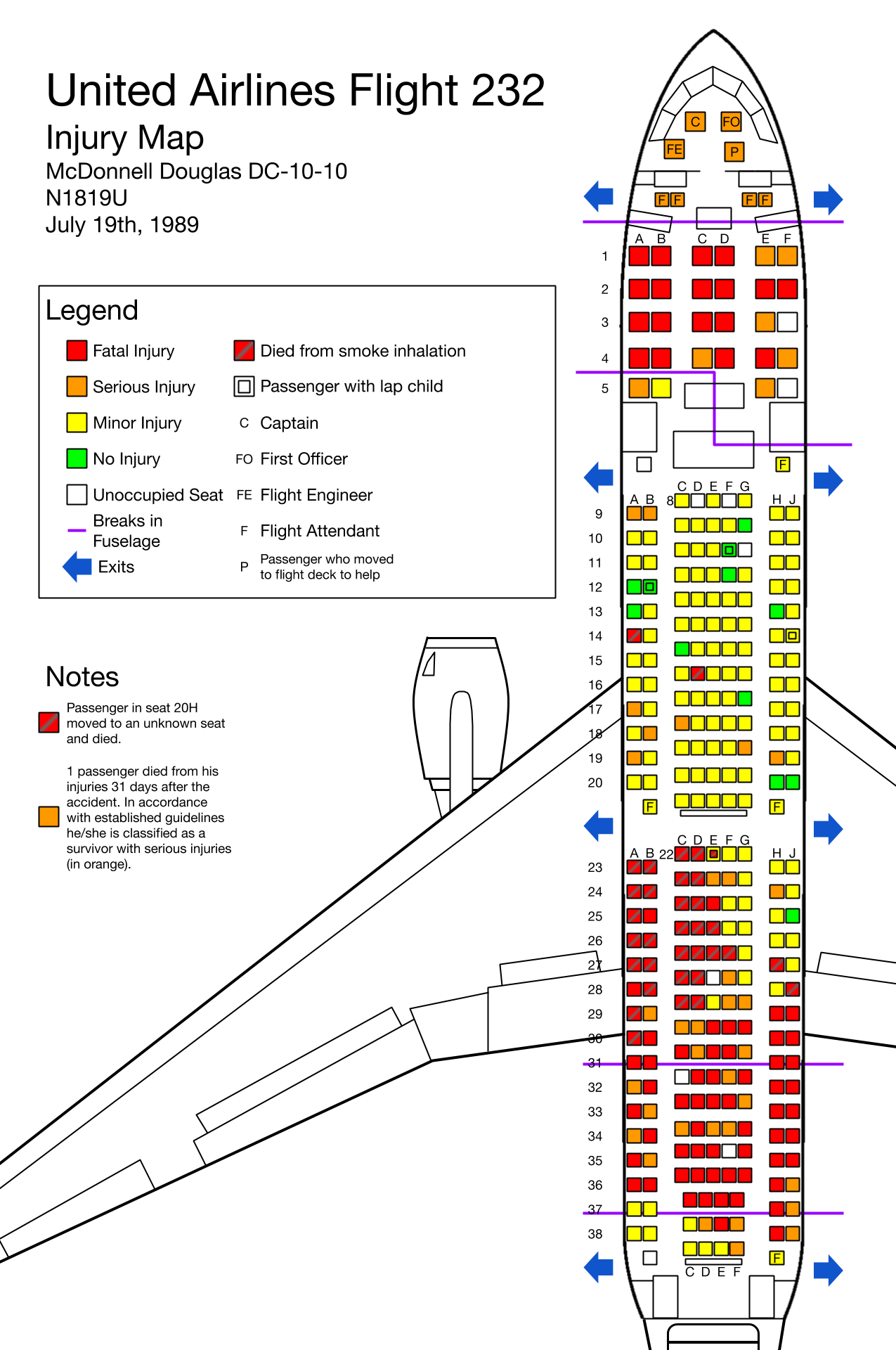
Locations of passengers indicated by severity/lack of injury, and reason of death from the NTSB report

Of the 296 people aboard, 112 died from the accident. Most were killed by injuries sustained during the multiple impacts, but 35 people in the middle fuselage section directly above the fuel tanks died from smoke inhalation in the post-crash fire. Of those, 24 had no traumatic blunt-force injuries. The majority of the 184 survivors were seated behind first class and ahead of the wings. Many passengers were able to walk out through the ruptures of the structure.

Of all of the people aboard (passengers and crew):

- 35 died because of smoke inhalation (none were in first class).
- 76 died for reasons other than smoke inhalation (17 in first class).
- 47 were injured seriously (8 in first class). This includes 1 passenger who died a month after the crash.
- 125 had minor injuries (1 in first class).
- 13 had no injuries (none in first class).

The passengers who died for reasons other than smoke inhalation were seated in rows 1–4, 24–25, and 28–38. Passengers who died because of smoke inhalation were seated in rows 14, 16, and 22–30. The person assigned to seat 20H moved to an unknown seat and died of smoke inhalation.

One crash survivor died one month after the accident; he was classified according to NTSB regulations as a survivor with serious injuries.

Fifty-two children, including four "lap children" without their own seats, were aboard the flight because of a United Airlines promotion for "Children's Day". Eleven children, including one lap child, died. Many of the children were traveling alone.

Rescuers did not identify the remains of the cockpit, with the four crew members alive inside, until 35 minutes after the crash. All four recovered from their injuries and eventually returned to flight duty.

=== Notable people on board ===
==== Victims ====
- Jay Ramsdell – commissioner of the Continental Basketball Association
- John Kenneth Stille – chemist

==== Survivors ====
- Spencer Bailey – writer, editor, and journalist
- Helen Young Hayes – investment fund manager
- Al Haynes – captain of UA232
- Michael R. Matz – Olympian and racehorse trainer
- Jerry Schemmel – former radio broadcaster for the Colorado Rockies and Denver Nuggets
- Pete Wernick – musician, who managed to resume performing two days after the crash

== Investigation ==
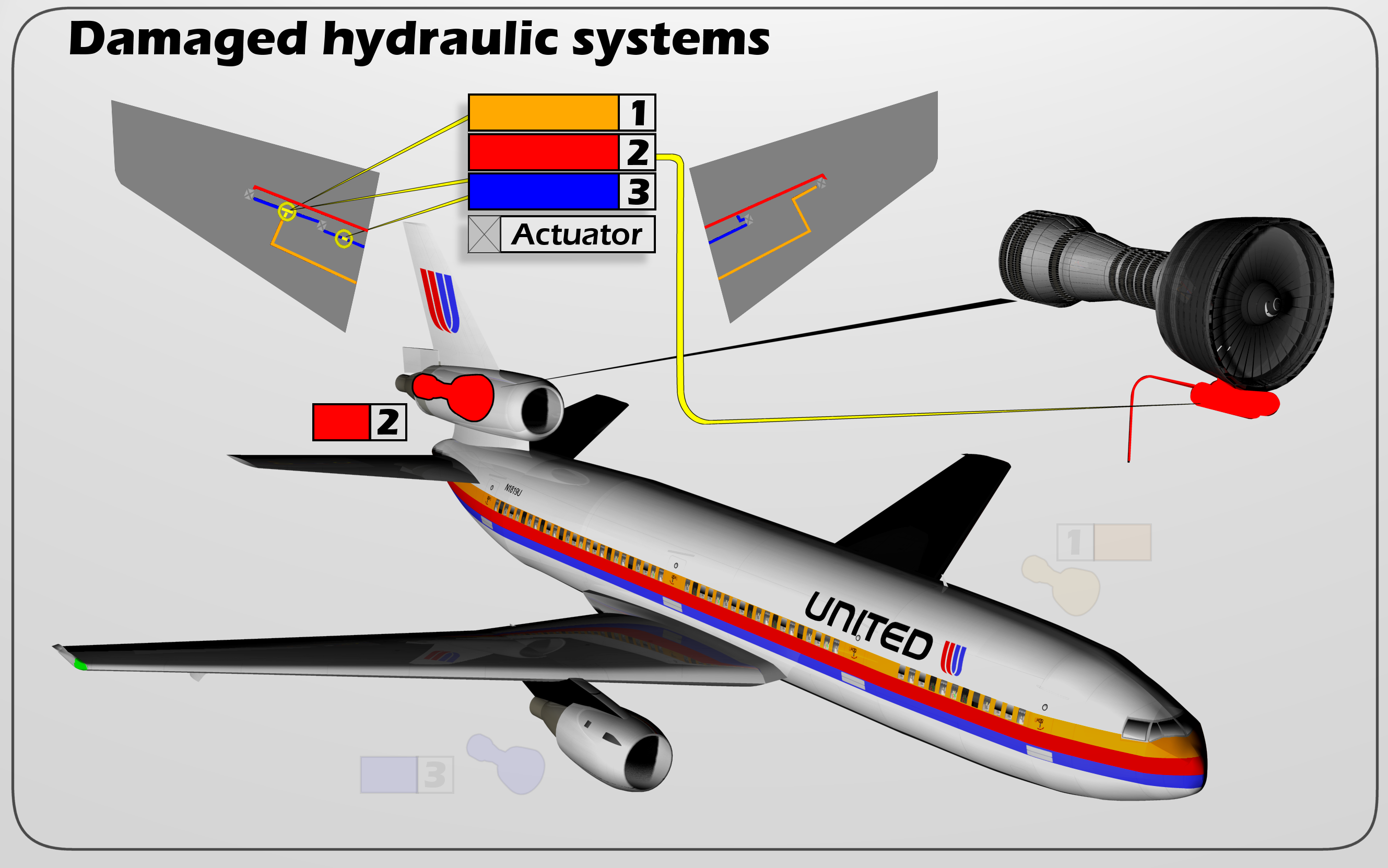
Damaged hydraulic systems in the DC-10

The rear engine's fan disk and blade assembly – about 8 ft (2.4 m) across – could not be located at the accident scene despite an extensive search. The engine's manufacturer, General Electric, offered rewards of $50,000 for the disk and $1,000 for each fan blade. Three months after the crash, a farmer discovered most of the fan disk, with several blades still attached, in her cornfield, thereby qualifying her for a reward, as a General Electric lawyer confirmed. The rest of the fan disk and most of the additional blades were later found nearby.

The NTSB determined that the probable cause of this accident was the inadequate consideration given to human factors limitations in the inspection and quality control procedures used by United Airlines' engine overhaul facility. These resulted in the failure to detect a fatigue crack originating from a previously undetected metallurgical defect located in a critical area of the titanium-alloy stage-1 fan disk that was manufactured by General Electric Aircraft Engines. The uncontained manner in which the engine failed resulted in high-speed metal fragments being hurled from the engine; these fragments penetrated the hydraulic lines of all three independent hydraulic systems aboard the aircraft, which rapidly lost their hydraulic fluid. The subsequent catastrophic disintegration of the disk resulted in the liberation of debris in a pattern of distribution and with energy levels that exceeded the level of protection provided by design features of the hydraulic systems that operate the DC-10's flight controls; the flight crew lost its ability to operate nearly all of them.

=== Failed component ===
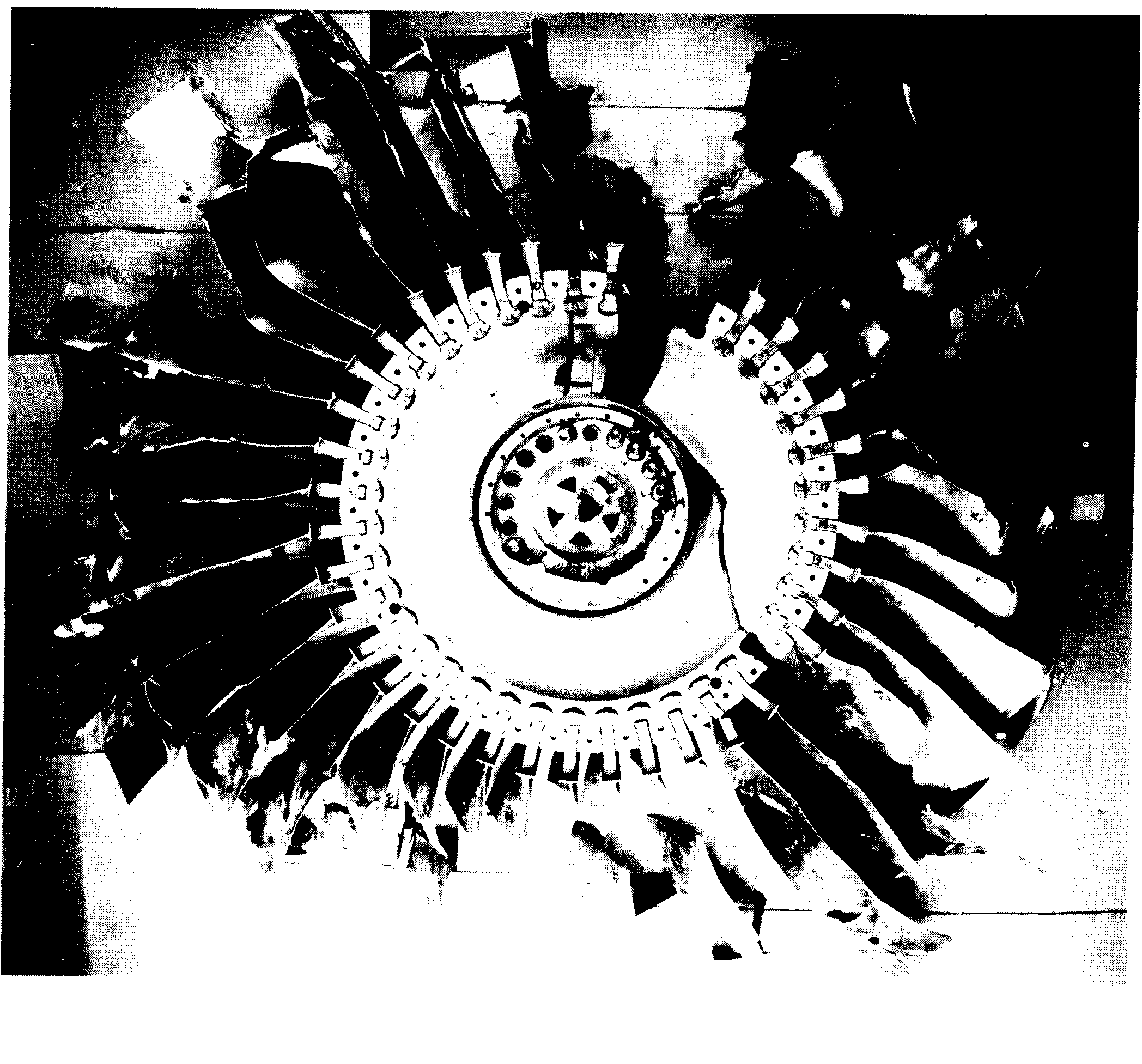
The fracture is clearly visible in the recovered fan disk from the center engine of UAL 232.

The investigation praised the actions of the flight crew for saving lives and identified the cause of the accident as a failure by United Airlines maintenance processes and personnel to detect an existing fatigue crack. The Probable Cause in the report by the NTSB read as follows:

The National Transportation Safety Board determines that the probable cause of this accident was the inadequate consideration given to human factors limitations in the inspection and quality control procedures used by United Airlines' engine overhaul facility which resulted in the failure to detect a fatigue crack originating from a previously undetected metallurgical defect located in a critical area of the stage 1 fan disk that was manufactured by General Electric Aircraft Engines. The subsequent catastrophic disintegration of the disk resulted in the liberation of debris in a pattern of distribution and with energy levels that exceeded the level of protection provided by design features of the hydraulic systems that operate the DC-10's flight controls.

Post-crash analysis of the crack surfaces showed the presence of a penetrating fluorescent dye used to detect cracks during maintenance. The presence of the dye indicated that the crack was present and should have been detected at a prior inspection. The detection failure arose from poor attention to human factors in United Airlines' specification of maintenance processes.

Investigators discovered an impurity and fatigue crack in the disk. Titanium reacts with air when melted, which creates impurities that can initiate fatigue cracks like that found in the crash disk. To prevent this, the ingot that would become the fan disk was formed using a "double vacuum" process: the raw materials were melted together in a vacuum, allowed to cool and solidify, then melted in a vacuum once more. After the double vacuum process, the ingot was shaped into a billet, a sausage-like form about 16 inches in diameter, and tested using ultrasound to look for defects. Defects were located and the ingot was processed further to remove them, but some nitrogen contamination remained. GE added a third vacuum-forming stage in 1971 because of their investigation into failing rotating titanium engine parts.

The contamination caused what is known as a hard alpha inclusion, where a contaminant particle in a metal alloy causes the metal around it to become brittle. The brittle titanium around the impurity then cracked during forging and fell out during final machining, leaving a cavity with microscopic cracks at the edges. For the next 18 years, the crack grew slightly each time the engine was powered up and brought to operating temperature. Eventually, the crack broke open, causing the disk to fail.

The origins of the crash disk are uncertain because of significant irregularities and gaps, noted in the NTSB report, in the manufacturing records of GE Aircraft Engines (GEAE) and its suppliers. Records found after the accident indicated that two rough-machined forgings having the serial number of the crash disk had been routed through GEAE manufacturing. Records indicated that Alcoa supplied GE with TIMET titanium forgings for one disk with the serial number of the crash disk. Some records show that this disk "was rejected for an unsatisfactory ultrasonic indication", that an outside laboratory performed an ultrasound inspection of this disk, that this disk was subsequently returned to GE, and that this disk should have been scrapped. The FAA report stated, "There is no record of warranty claim by GEAE for defective material and no record of any credit for GEAE processed by Alcoa or TIMET".

GE records of the second disk having the serial number of the crash disk indicate that it was made with an RMI Titanium Company titanium billet supplied by Alcoa. Research of GE's records showed no other titanium parts were manufactured at GE from this RMI titanium billet between 1969 and 1990. GE records indicate that final finishing and inspection of the crash disk were completed on December 11, 1971. Alcoa records indicate that this RMI titanium billet was first cut in 1972 and that all forgings made from this material were for airframe parts. If the Alcoa records were accurate, the RMI titanium could not have been used to manufacture the crash disk, indicating that the initially rejected TIMET disk with "an unsatisfactory ultrasonic indication" was the crash disk.

CF6 engines like the one containing the crash disk were used to power many civilian and military aircraft at the time of the crash. Due to concerns that the accident could reoccur, a large number of in-service disks were examined by ultrasound for indications of defects. The fan disks on at least two other engines were found to have defects like that of the crash disk. Prioritization and efficiency of inspections of the many engines suspected would have been aided by determination of the titanium source of the crash disk. Chemical analyses of the crash disk intended to determine its source were inconclusive. The NTSB report stated that if examined disks were not from the same source, "the records on a large number of GEAE disks are suspect. It also means that any AD [Airworthiness Directive] action that is based on the serial number of a disk could fail to have its intended effect because suspect disks could remain in service."

== Influence on the industry ==
The NTSB investigation, after reconstructions of the accident in flight simulators, deemed that training for such an event involved too many factors to be practical. While some degree of control was possible, no precision could be achieved, and a landing with these conditions was stated to be "a highly random event". Expert United and McDonnell Douglas pilots were unable to reproduce a survivable landing; according to a United pilot who flew with Fitch, "Most of the simulations never even made it close to the ground" with the aircraft under control. The NTSB stated that "under the circumstances the UAL (United Airlines) flight crew performance was highly commendable and greatly exceeded reasonable expectations." At the time of the crash, McDonnell Douglas had ended production of DC-10's, with the last of these being delivered to Nigeria Airways during the summer of 1989. The last passenger version of the DC-10 flew in 2014, although freighter versions continued to operate until late 2022.

Because this type of aircraft control (with loss of control surfaces) is difficult for humans to achieve, some researchers have attempted to integrate this control ability into the computers of fly-by-wire aircraft. Early attempts to add the ability to real airplanes were not very successful; the software was based on experiments performed in flight simulators where jet engines are usually modeled as "perfect" devices with exactly the same thrust on each engine, a linear relationship between throttle setting and thrust, and instantaneous response to input. Later, computer models were updated to account for these nonlinear factors, and aircraft such as the F-15 STOL/MTD have been flown successfully with this software installed.

=== Titanium processing ===
The manufacturing process for titanium was changed to eliminate the type of gaseous anomaly that served as the starting point for the crack. Newer batches of titanium use much higher melting temperatures and a "triple vacuum" process in an attempt to eliminate such impurities (triple melt VAR).

=== Aircraft designs ===
Newer aircraft designs have incorporated hydraulic fuses to isolate a punctured section and prevent a total loss of hydraulic fluid. After the United 232 accident, such fuses were installed in the number three hydraulic system in the area below the number two engine on all DC-10 aircraft to ensure sufficient control capability remained if all three hydraulic system lines should be damaged in the tail area. Although elevator and rudder control would be lost, the aircrew would still be able to control the aircraft's pitch (up and down) with stabilizer trim, and would be able to control roll (left and right) with some of the aircraft's ailerons and spoilers. Although not ideal, the system provides greater control than that which was available to the crew of United 232.

Losing all three hydraulic systems remained possible if serious damage occurs elsewhere, as nearly happened to a cargo DC-10-40F in April 2002 during takeoff in San Salvador when a main-gear tire exploded after running over a lost thrust reverser cascade. The extensive damage in the left wing caused total loss of pressure from the number-one and the number-two hydraulic systems. The number-three system was dented but not penetrated. NTSB then recommended that FAA "Require adequate protection of DC-10 hydraulic system components in the wing area from tire fragments" by better shielding or adding fuses in this area.

=== Restraints for children ===
Of the four children deemed too young to require seats of their own ("lap children"), one died from smoke inhalation. The NTSB added a safety recommendation to the FAA on its "List of Most Wanted Safety Improvements" in May 1999 suggesting a requirement for children younger than two years old to be restrained safely, which was removed in November 2006. The accident began a campaign directed by United Flight 232's senior flight attendant, Jan Brown Lohr, for all children to have seats on aircraft.

The argument against requiring seats on aircraft for children younger than age two is the higher cost to a family of having to buy a seat for the child, and this higher cost will motivate more families to drive instead of fly, and incur the much greater risk of driving (see epidemiology of motor vehicle collisions). The FAA estimates that a regulation that all children must have a seat would equate, for every one child's life saved on an aircraft, to 60 people dying in highway accidents.

Though it is no longer on the "most wanted" list, providing aircraft restraints for children younger than age two is still recommended practice by the NTSB and FAA, though it is not required by the FAA as of May 2016. The NTSB asked the International Civil Aviation Organization to make this a requirement in September 2013.

=== Crew resource management ===
The accident has since become an example of successful crew resource management (CRM). For much of aviation's history, the captain was considered the final authority, and crews were expected to respect the captain's expertise without question. This began to change during the 1970s, especially after the Tenerife airport disaster in 1977 and the crash of United Airlines Flight 173 outside Portland, Oregon, in 1978. CRM, while still considering the captain as final authority, instructs crew members to speak up when they detect a problem, and instructs captains to listen to crew concerns. United Airlines instituted a CRM class during the early 1980s. The NTSB later credited this training as valuable for the success of United 232's crew in handling their emergency.

== Factors contributing to survival rate ==
Of the 296 people aboard, 112 were killed and 184 survived. Haynes later identified three factors relating to the time of day that increased the survival rate:

1. The accident occurred during daylight hours in good weather;
2. The accident occurred as a shift change was occurring at both a regional trauma center and a regional burn center in Sioux City, allowing for more medical personnel to treat the injured;
3. The accident occurred when the Iowa Air National Guard was on duty at Sioux Gateway Airport, allowing for 285 trained personnel to assist with triage and evacuation of the injured.

"Had any of those things not been there," Haynes said, "I'm sure the fatality rate would have been a lot higher."

Haynes also credited CRM as being one of the factors that saved his own life, and many others.

[...] the preparation that paid off for the crew was something [...] called cockpit resource management [...] Up until 1980, we kind of worked on the concept that the captain was THE authority on the aircraft. What he said, goes. And we lost a few airplanes because of that. Sometimes the captain isn't as smart as we thought he was. And we would listen to him, and do what he said, and we wouldn't know what he's talking about. And we had 103 years of flying experience there in the cockpit, trying to get that airplane on the ground, not one minute of which we had actually practiced, any one of us. So why would I know more about getting that airplane on the ground under those conditions than the other three. So if I hadn't used CRM, if we had not let everybody put their input in, it's a cinch we wouldn't have made it.

When Haynes died in August 2019, United Airlines issued a statement thanking him for "his exceptional efforts aboard Flight UA232".

As with the Eastern Air Lines Flight 401 crash of a similarly sized Lockheed L-1011 in 1972, the relatively shallow angle of descent (Note: Angle of descent and rate of descent are two different things. The aircraft approached at a high rate of descent but, because its forward speed was also high, a shallow angle.) likely played a large part in the relatively high survival rate. The National Transportation Safety Board concluded that under the circumstances, "a safe landing was virtually impossible".

== In media ==
=== Depictions ===
- The accident was the subject of 11th-season episode 13 of the documentary series Mayday (also known as Air Crash Investigation), titled "Impossible Landing" (13 April 2012). The episode featured interviews with survivors and showed actual footage of the crash.
- The accident was the subject of the 1992 television movie A Thousand Heroes, also known as Crash Landing: The Rescue of Flight 232.
- The episode "Engineering Disasters" (season 6, episode 18) of Modern Marvels featured the crash.
- The accident was featured in an episode of Seconds from Disaster (S2E7 9/13/05 "Crash Landing in/at Sioux City") on the National Geographic Channel and MSNBC Investigates on the MSNBC news channel.
- The History Channel distributed a documentary named Shockwave; a portion of Episode 7 (originally aired January 25, 2008) detailed the events of the crash.
- The episode "A Wing and a Prayer" of Survival in the Sky (UK title: Black Box) featured the accident.
- The Biography Channel series I Survived... explained in detail the events of the crash through passenger Jerry Schemmel, flight attendant Jan Brown Lohr, and pilot Alfred Haynes.
- The episode "Crisis in the Cockpit" (Season 2, Episode 1) of Why Planes Crash on The Weather Channel featured the accident.
- The 1999 play Charlie Victor Romeo (made into a film in 2013) dramatically reenacted the incident using transcripts from the cockpit voice recorder (CVR).
- The 1991 novel Cold Fire, by Dean Koontz, includes a fictional crash based on Flight 232.
- The 1993 film Fearless portrayed a fictional plane crash based in part on the crash of Flight 232.
- In 2016, The House Theatre of Chicago produced United Flight 232. The play was a new work directed and adapted by Vanessa Stalling and based on the book Flight 232 by Laurence Gonzales. Surviving crew members attended the play in April 2016, and the production was subsequently nominated for six Equity Jeff Awards, winning two.
- In 2021, the accident was covered in episode 5 of the UK TV series Plane Crash Recreated.

=== Survivor accounts ===
- Dennis Fitch described his experiences in Errol Morris's television show First Person, episode "Leaving the Earth".
- Martha Conant told her story of survival to her daughter-in-law, Brittany Conant, on "Storycorps" during NPR's Morning Edition of January 11, 2008.
- Flight 232: A Story of Disaster and Survival by Laurence Gonzales (2014, W. W. Norton & Company; ISBN 978-0-393-24002-3).
- Miracle in the Cornfield – an inside survivor narrative by Joseph Trombello (1999, PrintSource Plus, Appleton, WI; ISBN 0966981502)
- When the World Breaks Your Heart: Spiritual Ways of Living With Tragedy by Gregory S. Clapper, a chaplain in the National Guard who relates the stories of some of the survivors he aided in the aftermath of the crash (1999; 2016, Wipf and Stock; ISBN 978-1-498-28428-8)
- Chosen to Live: The Inspiring Story of Flight 232 Survivor Jerry Schemmel by Jerry Schemmel with Kevin Simpson (Victory Pub. Co.,1996; ISBN 978-0-965-20865-9).
- Spencer Bailey discussed his experiences on the Time Sensitive podcast, in a 2019 interview with Andrew Zuckerman.

== Flight 232 Memorial ==
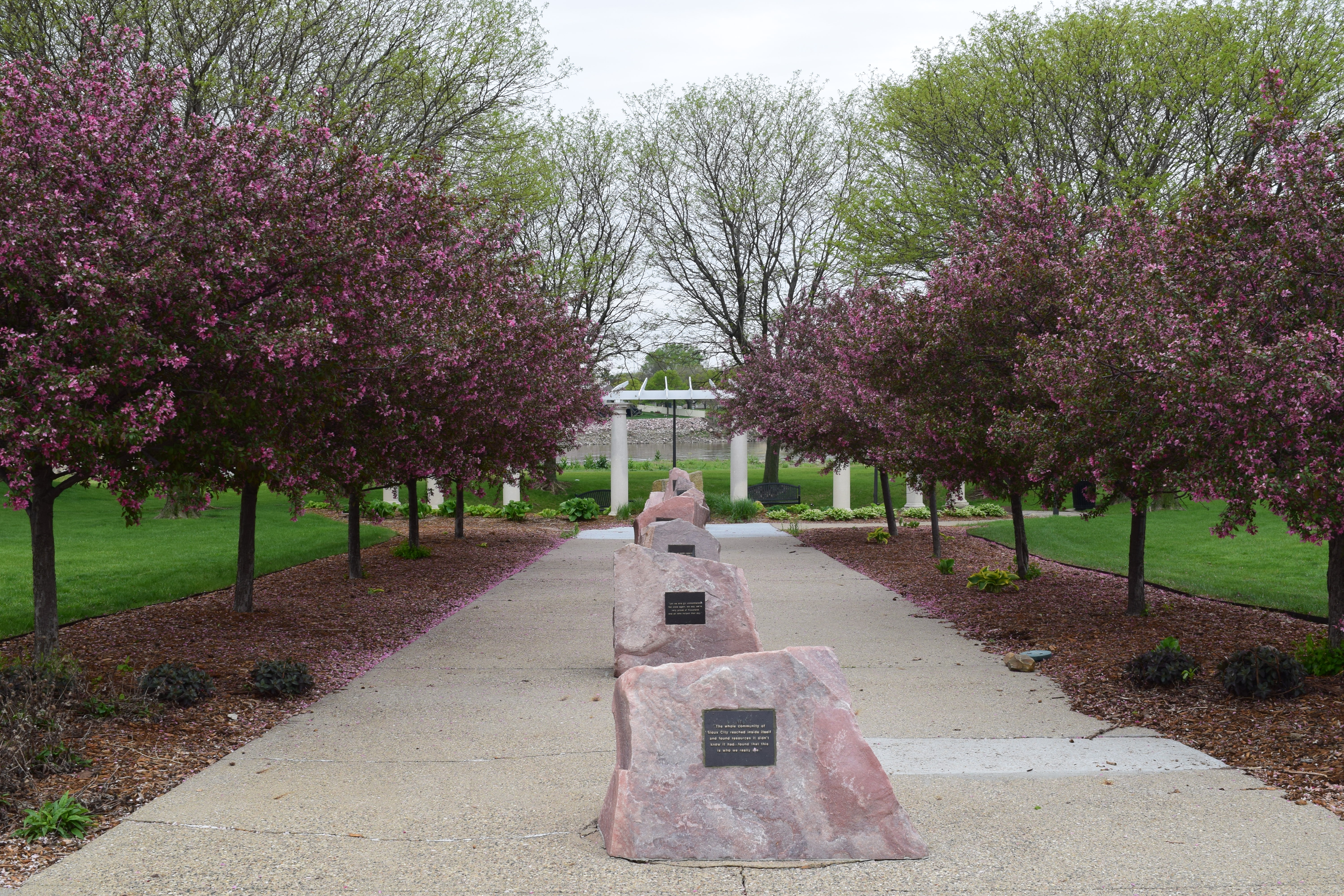
Flight 232 Memorial

The Flight 232 Memorial was built along the Missouri River in Sioux City, Iowa, to commemorate the heroism of the flight crew and the rescue efforts the Sioux City community undertook after the crash. It features a statue of Iowa National Guard Lt. Col. Dennis Nielsen from a news photo that was taken that day while he was carrying a three-year-old to safety.

== See also ==
- Azerbaijan Airlines Flight 8243
- Baikal Airlines Flight 130
- Eastern Air Lines Flight 935
- Japan Air Lines Flight 123
- LOT Flight 007
- LOT Flight 5055
- National Airlines Flight 27
- Pan Am Flight 845
- List of aircraft accidents and incidents resulting in at least 50 fatalities
- List of United Airlines accidents and incidents
