= Spencer Bailey =

American writer, editor, and journalist

- Born: August 18, 1985 (age 41); Denver, Colorado
- Education: Dickinson College, Columbia University
- Occupations: Writer, editor, journalist, podcast host
- Spouse: Emma Bowen (m. 2023)

Spencer Bailey (born August 18, 1985) is an American writer, editor, journalist, and podcast host. He is founder and editor-in-chief of The Slowdown and host of Time Sensitive. He previously served as editor-in-chief of Surface magazine.

== Early life ==
Bailey was born and raised in Denver, Colorado.

=== United Airlines Flight 232 ===
On July 19, 1989, a month before his fourth birthday, Bailey survived the crash landing of United Airlines Flight 232 in Sioux City, Iowa. His brother Brandon also survived, but their mother, Frances, was one of the 112 passengers who died. Bailey was in a five-day coma following the crash, and he has no memory of the event. Bailey's twin brother, Trent, and their father, Brownell, were not on the plane.

Bailey is the subject of a famous photograph by Gary Anderson showing Lt. Colonel Dennis Nielsen carrying him to safety. The image was widely published, including on the cover of the July 31, 1989, issue of Time magazine. A statue based on the picture is part of the Flight 232 Memorial in Sioux City's riverfront development.

Bailey has said that surviving the crash has shaped his perspective on time and memory, recurring themes in his writing and interviews.

== Education ==
Bailey graduated from Pomfret School in Pomfret, Connecticut, in 2004. He received a B.A. in English from Dickinson College in Carlisle, Pennsylvania, in 2008 and an M.S. in journalism from Columbia University Graduate School of Journalism in 2010. He wrote his Dickinson College thesis about Philip Larkin as a jazz poet.

In 2009, he was a student in a fiction-writing seminar taught by Gordon Lish. He has credited the Lish workshop as "central to my journey as a writer and editor."

== Career ==
=== 2009–2010: Early work ===
In 2009 and 2010, Bailey interned in the editorial departments at Esquire and Vanity Fair.

=== 2010–2014: Bloomberg Businessweek, The New York Times Magazine ===
From 2010 to 2013, Bailey was a frequent contributor to Bloomberg Businessweek, and from 2011 to 2014, The New York Times Magazine.

Reporting for The New York Times Magazine, in October 2011, he spent a night at Zucotti Park and a nearby McDonald's during the Occupy Wall Street movement. Over the next three years, he interviewed authors, celebrities, politicians, and cultural figures such as Tony Hawk, Rodney King, Cyndi Lauper, Yoko Ono, and Al Sharpton for a "How to ..." column. Bailey's interview with Rodney King was one of King's last before his fiancée found him dead at the bottom of a swimming pool.

=== 2010–2018: Surface Media ===
In 2010, Bailey briefly worked at The Daily Beast, then was hired as assistant editor at Surface magazine.

In 2013, at age 27, Bailey became editor-in-chief of Surface. During his tenure, Surface broadened its editorial scope beyond the design industry while evolving from a magazine into a broader media company. At Surface, Bailey interviewed hundreds of leading architects, artists, designers, and cultural figures, including Tadao Ando, Frank Gehry, Zaha Hadid, Renzo Piano, Ian Schrager, and Kanye West, and created the Design Dialogues conversation series. His interview with West, published in the December 2016/January 2017 issue, was covered internationally. Billboard called it "thoughtful."

In 2017, Bailey was named editorial director of Surface Media. In 2018, he announced he was leaving Surface Media.

=== 2018–Present: The Slowdown ===
In 2018, Bailey was named a contributing editor at Town & Country, where he covers architecture and design, and joined the book publisher Phaidon as editor-at-large.

In 2019, with Andrew Zuckerman, Bailey co-founded The Slowdown, an independent media company known for long-view storytelling through its Time Sensitive podcast, newsletters, books, and other editorial projects exploring art, architecture, design, travel, and culture. In 2023, Bailey became the sole owner of the company. Writing about The Slowdown in 2024, Galerie magazine highlighted it as a media platform emphasizing attention, reflection, and the value of time.

On Time Sensitive, Bailey interviews artists, architects, writers, poets, chefs, musicians, scientists, and other figures across culture about how time has shaped their lives and work. Guests have included fashion designer Gabriela Hearst, author and translator Jhumpa Lahiri, poet and playwright Claudia Rankine, architect John Pawson, and artist and photographer Hiroshi Sugimoto.

From 2020 to 2023, The Slowdown also produced the At a Distance podcast, co-hosted by Bailey, which in 2021 was turned into a book, At a Distance: 100 Visionaries at Home in a Pandemic. Guests on the show included Bill McKibben, Tatiana Schlossberg, Suzanne Simard, Rebecca Solnit, and Bessel van der Kolk.

In October 2020, Phaidon published Bailey’s book In Memory Of: Designing Contemporary Memorials, which features more than 60 memorials commemorating some of the most destructive events of the 20th and 21st centuries, including war, genocide, massacres, terrorism, famine, and slavery. The book was named a Literary Hub "favorite book of the year" and a Financial Times "best book of 2020."

In 2024, The Leading Hotels of the World announced that it had named Bailey editor-in-chief of a five-year, five-volume book series, with The Slowdown overseeing the editorial direction of the entire project.

== Bibliography ==
- Tham ma da: The Adventurous Interiors of Paola Navone (Pointed Leaf Press, 2016)
- In Memory Of: Designing Contemporary Memorials (Phaidon, 2020)
- At a Distance: 100 Visionaries at Home in a Pandemic (Apartamento, 2021)
- Alchemy: The Material World of David Adjaye (Phaidon, 2023)
- Design: The Leading Hotels of the World (Monacelli, 2024)
- Culture: The Leading Hotels of the World (Monacelli, 2025)
- Explore: The Leading Hotels of the World (Monacelli, 2026)
