= Designed by Apple in California =

Photobook of Apple products

- Author: Jonathan Ive
- Illustrator: Andrew Zuckerman
- Publisher: Apple Inc.
- Publication date: November 15, 2016
- ISBN: 9780997513813
- OCLC: 964571563

Designed by Apple in California is a photo-book written by Jonathan Ive with photos taken by Andrew Zuckerman, and published by Apple Inc. in 2016. The book is intended to showcase the company's history, containing 450 pictures of Apple products released from 1998 to 2015.

Designed by Apple in California received praise for its showcase of late Apple co-founder Steve Jobs' work and the book's physical design, while it took criticism for being considered a "vanity project" and that many of its pictures were already publicized.

== Synopsis ==
The book contains 450 photographs of new and old Apple products taken by Andrew Zuckerman, showcased on stark white backgrounds. They cover 20 years of the company's product design, from the iMac G3 released in 1998 to the Apple Pencil released in 2015, although not all products during that timeframe are included. In addition to its photographs, the book also discusses the materials used in Apple products and techniques used by the company's design team. The book was dedicated to Apple co-founder Steve Jobs and contains an introduction written by then-Apple chief design officer Jony Ive. Ive described the book as an "archive". Apple stated that the book is printed on "specially milled, custom-dyed paper with gilded matte silver edges, using eight color separations and low-ghost ink", and that it was linen-bound, hardcover, and developed "over an eight-year period".

== Release ==
The book was announced by Apple Inc. on November 15, 2016. It was published in two sizes, a "small" version measuring 10.2 inches by 12.75 inches (260x324mm) for $199 (£169), and a "large" version measuring 13 inches by 16.25 inches (330x413mm) for $299 (£249), sold by Apple online and in some of its retail Apple Store locations. The book was discontinued by Apple in August 2019, selling out worldwide by September of the same year.

== Reception ==
Rene Ritchie of iMore gave a positive review, noting that the book "collects and catalogs the products willed into the world by Steve Jobs, Jony Ive, and the team they assembled in Cupertino" and that it "is one of the most finely crafted books [he has] ever owned". Brian Fagioli of BetaNews commented that the book's high price "sets the value and desirability at a high level" and that it is "intended to be a collectible piece of art".

Kif Leswing of Business Insider gave a negative review, describing the book as "Ive's vanity project" and stating that many of its photos have been released by Apple before. Leswing felt the book itself was large in size and "not that special" for its price, compared to art books, and that he could spend the book's price "on way more fun things — like Snapchat's Spectacles, or a discounted Apple Watch".

James Vincent of The Verge said that the book's release "show[s] a certain amount of self-interest, navel-gazing, and even arrogance from Apple" and that he would "be interested to see if the company can justify releasing another such book 20 years from now".
