= A Thousand Heroes =

1992 television film directed by Lamont Johnson

- Film poster
- Also known as: Crash Landing: The Rescue of Flight 232
- Written by: Harve Bennett
- Directed by: Lamont Johnson
- Starring: Charlton Heston; Richard Thomas; James Coburn
- Composer: Charles Fox
- Country of origin: United States
- Original language: English

Production
- Executive producer: Dorothea G. Petrie
- Producers: Bradley Wigor; Joseph Maurer
- Cinematography: William Wages
- Editor: Paul LaMastra
- Running time: 95 minutes
- Production companies: Dorothea G. Petrie Productions; Helios Productions; Bob Banner Associates; The Gary L. Pudney Company

Original release
- Network: ABC
- Release: February 24, 1992

A Thousand Heroes aka Crash Landing: The Rescue of Flight 232 is a 1992 American disaster drama television film directed by Lamont Johnson and written by Harve Bennett. The film stars Charlton Heston, Richard Thomas, and James Coburn. It is based on a true story of United Airlines Flight 232, which crash-landed at Sioux City, Iowa on July 19, 1989.

== Cast ==
- Charlton Heston as Al Haynes
- Richard Thomas as Gary Brown
- James Coburn as Jim Hathaway
- Leon Russom as Bob Hamilton
- John M. Jackson as Dennis Nielsen
- Tom O'Brien as Chris Porter
- Philip Baker Hall as Sam Gochenour
- Tom Everett as Mack Zubinski
- Carmen Argenziano as Bill Records
- Bruce McGill as Dudley Dvorak
- Arthur Rosenberg as Dennis Fitch
- Bill Geisslinger as Chuck Sundberg
- Steven M. Porter as Gary Anderson
- Stephanie Dunnam as Elaine Brown
- Mariangela Pino as Marcia Poole

== Awards and nominations ==
| Year | Award | Category | Recipient(s) | Result | Ref. |
|---|---|---|---|---|---|
| 1992 | 44th Primetime Emmy Awards | Outstanding Individual Achievement in Directing for a Miniseries or a Special | Lamont Johnson | Nominated | |
| 1992 | 44th Primetime Emmy Awards | Outstanding Individual Achievement in Sound Editing for a Miniseries or a Special | Andre Caporaso; Clark Conrad; Gary Gelfand; Stephen Grubbs; Philip Jamtaas; Joseph A. Johnston; Stan Jones; Craig Otte; David A. Scharf; Randal S. Thomas; Terence Thomas | Won | |
| 1992 | 44th Primetime Emmy Awards | Outstanding Sound Mixing for a Drama Miniseries or a Special | David E. Fluhr; George R. Groves Jr. Troy Porter; Kenneth B. Ross | Nominated | |
| 1992 | 39th Golden Reel Awards | Best Sound Editing in Television Long Form – Sound Effects & Foley | Stephen Grubbs | Won | |
