= List of United Airlines accidents and incidents =

The following is a list of accidents and incidents involving major US carrier United Airlines. This includes flights operated under the United Express brand.

== 1930s ==
- October 10, 1933 – United Air Lines Flight 23, a Boeing 247, was destroyed by explosives near Charlestown, Indiana, killing all 7 on board.
- February 23, 1934 – a Boeing 247 crashed in Summit County, Utah, killing all 8 on board.
- October 7, 1935 – United Air Lines Flight 4, a Boeing 247, crashed in Laramie County, Wyoming, killing all 12 on board.
- November 24, 1936 – a Boeing 247 crashed into a marsh north of Newark Airport. The 4 occupants survived.
- December 27, 1936 – United Air Lines Flight 34, a Boeing 247, crashed in Rice Canyon, Los Angeles County, killing all 12 on board.
- February 9, 1937 – a Douglas DC-3 crashed into San Francisco Bay on approach, killing all 11 on board. The first officer had dropped his microphone, which jammed the elevator controls.
- October 17, 1937 – United Air Lines Flight 1, a Douglas DC-3, crashed into Hayden Peak in adverse weather, killing all 19 on board.
- May 24, 1938 – United Air Lines Flight 9, a Douglas DST, crashed east of Cleveland Airport following an engine fire, killing all 10 on board.
- November 29, 1938 – United Air Lines Flight 6, a DC-3, ditched off Point Reyes following fuel exhaustion. 5 of the 7 on board were killed.

== 1940s ==
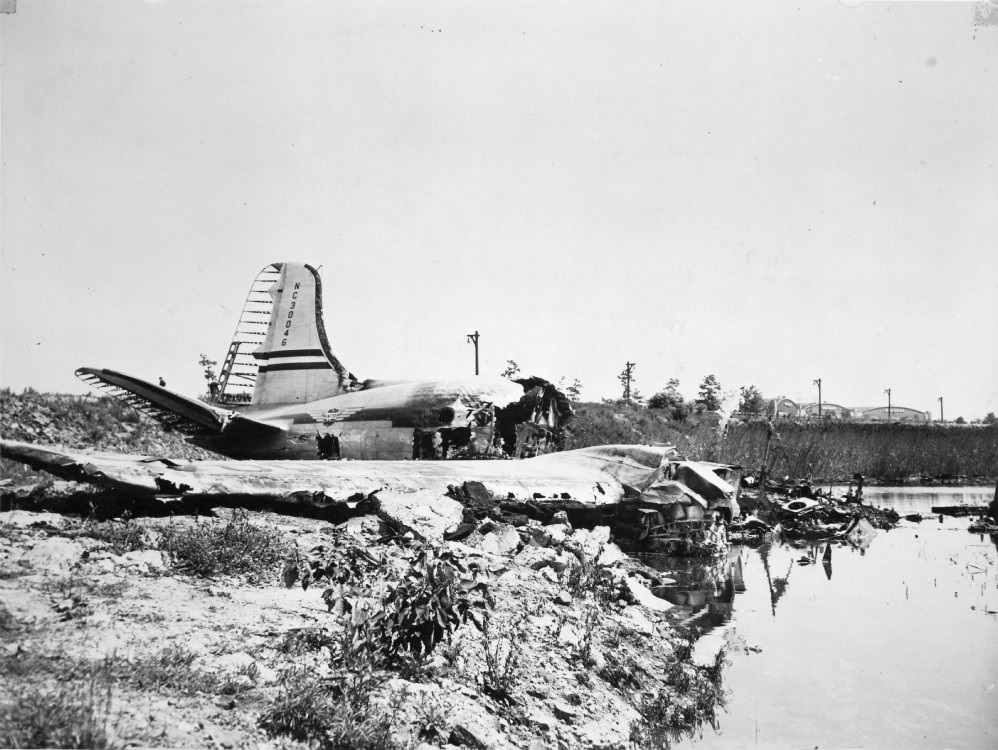
Wreckage of Flight 521

- November 4, 1940 – a Douglas DC-3 crashed into Bountiful Peak following navigational failure, killing all 10 on board.
- December 4, 1940 – a DC-3 stalled and crashed on landing at Chicago Midway Airport, killing 10 of the 16 on board.
- May 1, 1942 – United Air Lines Flight 4, a DC-3, crashed into a hill on approach to Salt Lake City Municipal Airport, killing all 17 on board.
- August 2, 1943 – a USAAF Consolidated C-87 Liberator Express operated by United crashed in Whenuapai, New Zealand, killing 16 of the 30 on board.
- January 31, 1946 – a DC-3 crashed into Elk Mountain, killing all 21 on board.
- May 29, 1946 – a Douglas DC-4 on a training flight suffered a hard landing at Chicago Municipal Airport, causing the landing gear and wings to collapse. The 4 on board survived.
- October 8, 1946 – a DC-4 crashed on landing at Cheyenne Airport, killing 2 of the 41 on board.
- November 11, 1946 – United Air Lines Flight 404, a DC-3, crashed short of the runway in Cleveland, killing 2 of the 20 on board.
- December 24, 1946 – a DC-4 overran the runway at Los Angeles International Airport. All 45 on board survived but the aircraft was written off.
- May 29, 1947 – United Air Lines Flight 521, a DC-4, overran the runway on takeoff from LaGuardia Airport, crashing into an embankment, plunging into a pond, and exploding. 43 of the 48 on board were killed.
- October 24, 1947 – United Air Lines Flight 608, a Douglas DC-6, crashed into Bryce Canyon National Park following an in-flight fire, killing all 52 on board.
- June 17, 1948 – United Air Lines Flight 624, a DC-6, crashed outside Aristes, Pennsylvania, killing all 43 on board. The aircraft suffered a false fire warning, and the pilots followed the aircraft's CO2 fire extinguisher procedure incorrectly, leading to their incapacitation.
- January 27, 1949 – a DC-3 crashed while the pilots attempted to return to Oakland Airport due to engine troubles. The 3 crew on board survived.

== 1950s ==
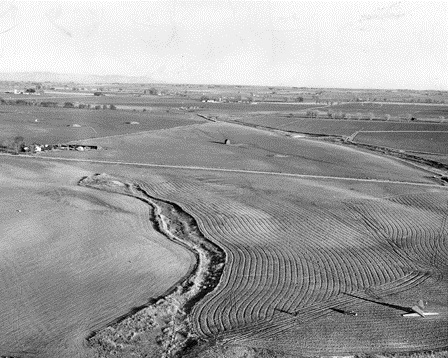
Crash site of Flight 629

- April 28, 1951 – United Air Lines Flight 129, a Douglas DC-3, crashed in poor weather during an aborted approach at Fort Wayne International Airport, killing all 11 on board.
- June 30, 1951 – United Air Lines Flight 610, a Douglas DC-6, crashed into Crystal Mountain west of Fort Collins, Colorado, killing all 50 on board.
- August 24, 1951 – United Air Lines Flight 615, a DC-6, crashed on approach to Oakland Municipal Airport, killing all 50 on board.
- September 12, 1951 – a Boeing 377 on a training flight stalled and crashed on approach to San Francisco International Airport, killing all 3 crew members.
- December 4, 1951 – United Air Lines Flight 16, a DC-3 on a training flight, stalled and crashed in Denver, killing all 3 crew members.
- April 4, 1955 – a DC-6 on a training flight stalled and crashed during a simulated engine failure exercise, shortly after takeoff from Long Island MacArthur Airport, killing all 3 crew members.
- October 6, 1955 – United Air Lines Flight 409, a Douglas DC-4, crashed into Medicine Bow Peak, killing all 66 on board.
- November 1, 1955 – United Air Lines Flight 629, a DC-6, was destroyed by a bomb near Denver, killing all 44 on board. Jack Gilbert Graham was responsible for the bombing, which he carried out to exact revenge on his mother and claim life insurance.
- June 30, 1956 – the 1956 Grand Canyon mid-air collision occurred when United Air Lines Flight 718, a Douglas DC-7, collided with Trans World Airlines Flight 2, a Lockheed L-1049, above the Grand Canyon. All 128 on both aircraft were killed.
- April 21, 1958 – United Air Lines Flight 736, a Douglas DC-7, collided in mid-air with a USAF F-100 Super Sabre over Enterprise, Nevada. All 49 on both aircraft were killed.

== 1960s ==
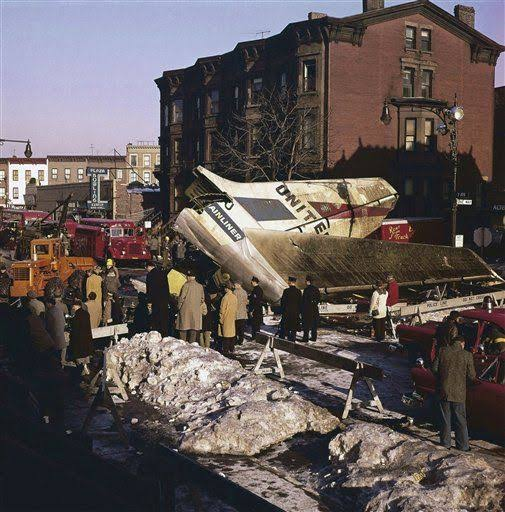
Flight 826

- December 16, 1960 – the 1960 New York mid-air collision occurred when United Air Lines Flight 826, a Douglas DC-8, collided in mid-air with TWA Flight 226, a Lockheed L-1049, above New York City. All 128 on both aircraft were killed, as well as 6 on the ground.
- July 11, 1961 – United Air Lines Flight 859, a DC-8, veered off the runway during an emergency landing at Denver Stapleton International Airport following a hydraulic failure. The aircraft caught fire, and 17 people were killed as well as 1 on the ground.
- November 23, 1962 – United Air Lines Flight 297, a Vickers Viscount, lost control following bird strikes and crashed in Howard County, Maryland. All 17 on board were killed.
- July 9, 1964 – United Air Lines Flight 823, a Vickers Viscount, suffered an in-flight fire and crashed in Cocke County, Tennessee, killing all 39 on board.
- August 16, 1965 – United Air Lines Flight 389, a Boeing 727, crashed into Lake Michigan on approach to O'Hare International Airport after the pilots misread the altimeter. All 30 on board were killed.
- October 17, 1965 – a DC-6 suffered an uncommanded retraction of the nose-gear on takeoff from Huntsville International Airport. The nose of the aircraft touched the runway and the aircraft overran. All 16 on board survived, but the aircraft was written off.
- November 11, 1965 – United Air Lines Flight 227, a Boeing 727, crashed short of the runway at Salt Lake City International Airport and caught fire. 43 of the 91 people on board were killed.
- May 18, 1966 – a Douglas DC-7 on a training flight suffered a landing gear collapse at Denver Stapleton International Airport. The 4 occupants survived but the aircraft was written off.
- January 19, 1967 – a Vickers Viscount collided with a snow plough on landing at Norfolk Municipal Airport, tearing off one of the aircraft's wings. No one was killed.
- November 28, 1967 – a Vickers Viscount suffered a nose gear collapse on landing at Raleigh–Durham International Airport. All 43 occupants survived but the aircraft was written off.
- December 11, 1967 – a Vickers Viscount overran the runway at Akron–Canton Airport. No one was killed but the aircraft was written off.
- January 18, 1969 – United Air Lines Flight 266, a Boeing 727, lost all electrical power and crashed after the pilots suffered spatial disorientation. All 38 on board were killed.

== 1970s ==
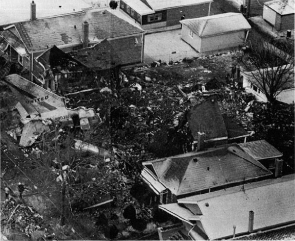
Crash site of Flight 553

- July 19, 1970 – a Boeing 737-200 overran the runway at Philadelphia International Airport, after the aircraft suffered an engine failure on takeoff, and the pilots elected to touch back down on the runway. The aircraft was written off.
- December 8, 1972 – United Air Lines Flight 553, a Boeing 737-200, stalled and crashed into a neighborhood while approaching Chicago Midway Airport. 43 on board and 2 on the ground were killed.
- December 18, 1977 – United Airlines Flight 2860, a Douglas DC-8 Freighter, crashed into the Wasatch Range while in a holding pattern. All 3 crew members were killed.
- December 28, 1978 – United Airlines Flight 173, a Douglas DC-8-61, ran out of fuel while circling above Portland, while the pilots attempted to troubleshoot a landing gear issue. The aircraft crashed into a suburb, killing 10 of the 189 people on board.

== 1980s ==
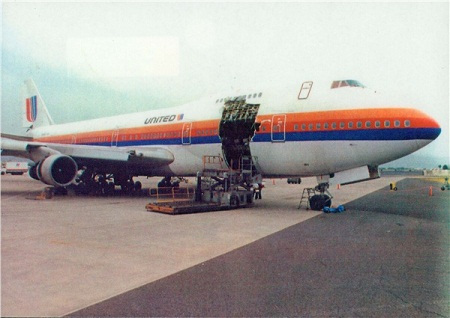
Flight 811

- January 11, 1983 – United Airlines Flight 2885, a Douglas DC-8 Freighter, stalled and crashed on takeoff from Detroit Metropolitan Airport due to pilot error. The crew had allowed the flight engineer to fly the aircraft. All 3 crew were killed.
- February 2, 1988 – United Express Flight 3749, a Convair 580 operated by Aspen Airways, veered off the runway at Durango–La Plata County Airport and struck a snow bank. No one was killed but the aircraft was written off.
- February 24, 1989 – United Airlines Flight 811, a Boeing 747-100, suffered an explosive decompression above the Pacific ocean after the cargo door opened in-flight. The decompression tore off a section of fuselage and resulted in the ejection of several rows of seats, killing 9 passengers. The aircraft returned to Honolulu and made a successful emergency landing.
- July 19, 1989 – United Airlines Flight 232, a McDonnell Douglas DC-10-10, suffered an uncontained failure of the no. 2 engine, causing damage to several hydraulic systems and the loss of all flight controls. The pilots were able to maneuver the aircraft to Sioux Gateway Airport by manipulating the throttles. The aircraft crashed on landing, killing 112 of the 296 people on board.
- December 26, 1989 – United Express Flight 2415, a BAe Jetstream 31 operated by North Pacific Airlines, stalled and crashed on approach to Tri-Cities Airport, Washington, killing all 6 on board.

== 1990s ==
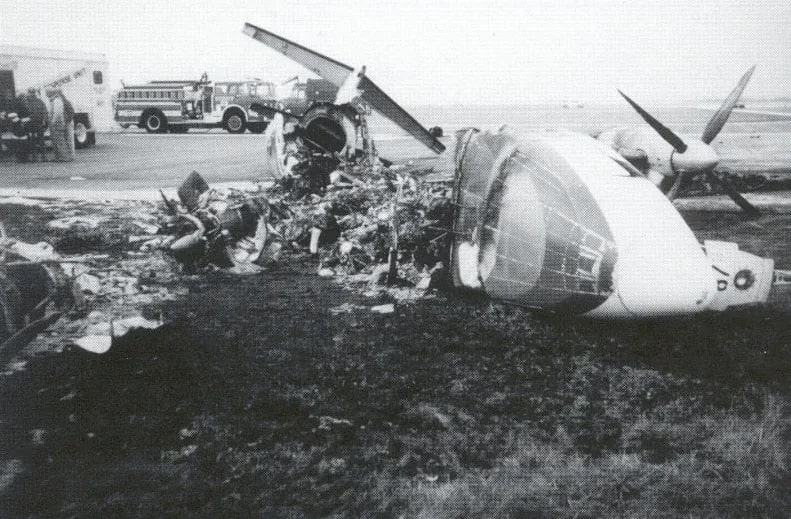
Wreckage of Flight 5925

- March 3, 1991 – United Airlines Flight 585, a Boeing 737-200, suffered a rudder hardover on approach to Colorado Springs Airport. The aircraft lost control and dived into the ground, killing all 25 on board.
- January 7, 1994 – United Express Flight 6291, a BAe Jetstream 41 operated by Atlantic Coast Airlines, stalled and crashed into a building short of the runway at John Glenn Columbus International Airport. 5 people were killed; a family of 3 escaped the aircraft.
- November 19, 1996 – United Express Flight 5925, a Beech 1900 operated by Great Lakes Airlines, collided on landing with a private Beech King Air that was departing from an intersecting runway at Quincy Regional Airport. All 14 on both aircraft were killed; the 12 on board the commercial flight survived the crash, but could not open the aircraft door in time and were killed by the ensuing fire.
- December 28, 1997 – United Airlines Flight 826, a Boeing 747-100, suffered severe clear-air turbulence over the Pacific ocean, while en-route from Tokyo to Honolulu. The aircraft returned to Narita Airport, but one passenger was killed.

== 2000s ==
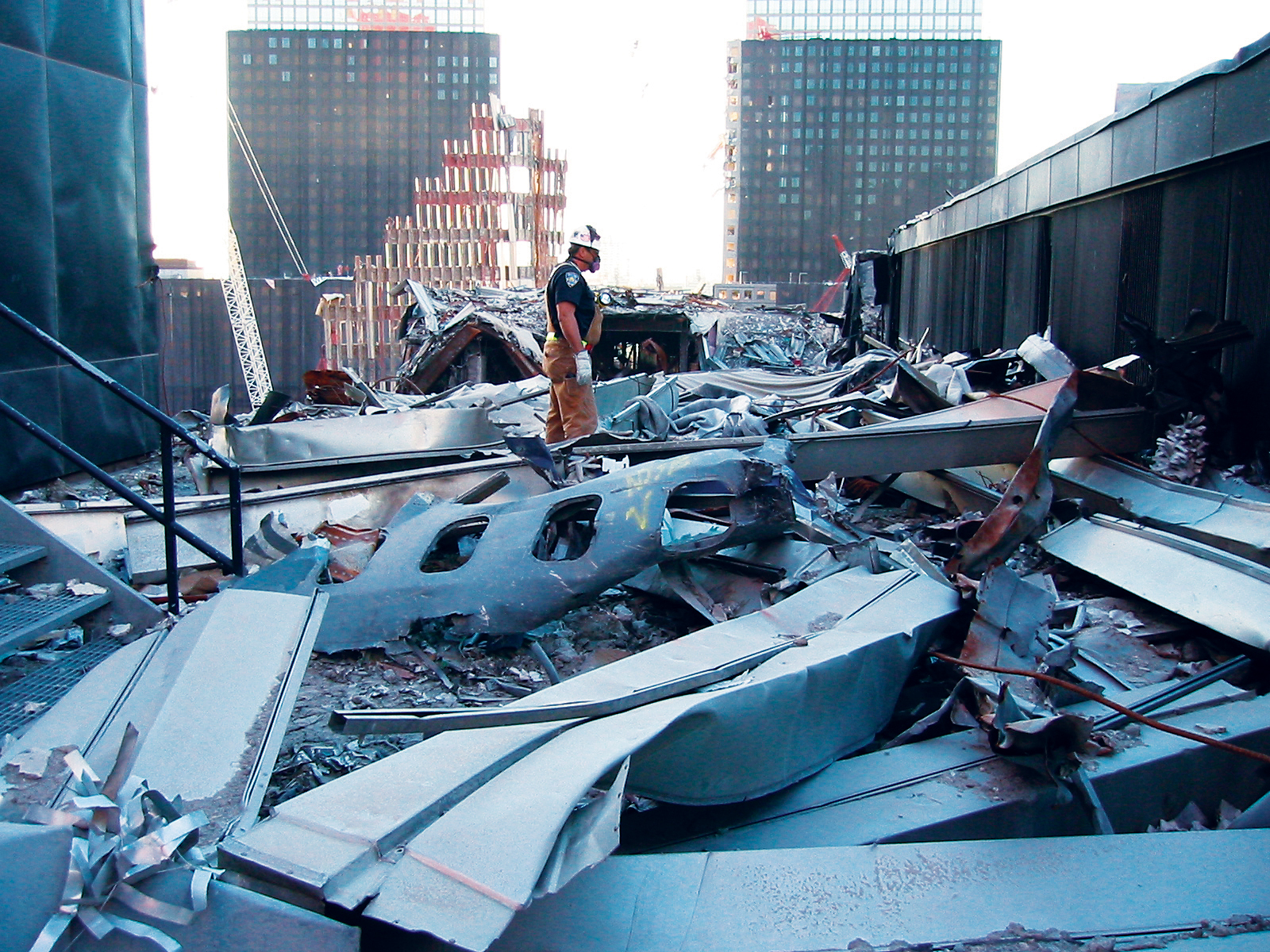
Debris from Flight 175

- September 11, 2001 attacks:
  - United Airlines Flight 175, a Boeing 767-200, was hijacked and flown into the South Tower of the World Trade Center. Approximately 1,000 people were killed, including all 60 passengers and crew on board, and all 5 hijackers.
  - United Airlines Flight 93, a Boeing 757-200, was hijacked. Passengers fought against the hijackers, and the aircraft crashed into a field in Shanksville, Pennsylvania, killing all 40 passengers and crew and 4 hijackers.
- September 25, 2008 – a Boeing 737-300 struck a lavatory truck on pushback at Chicago O'Hare Airport and was written off.

== 2010s ==
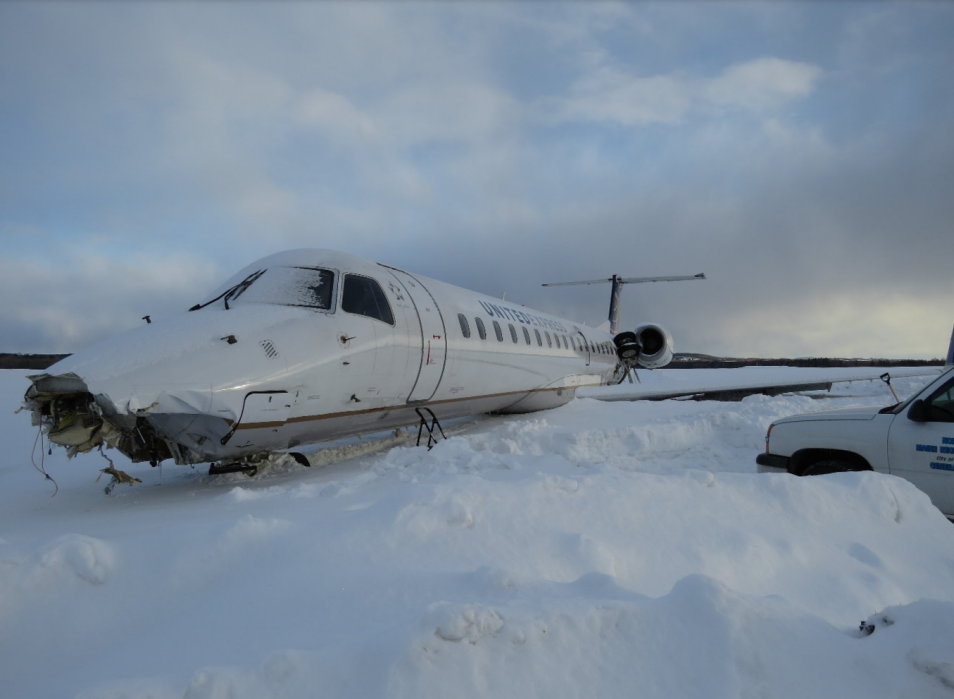
Flight 4933

- January 10, 2010 – United Airlines Flight 634, an Airbus A319, landed at Newark Liberty International Airport with the right main landing gear stuck in the retracted position. The aircraft received substantial damage, but all occupants were safely evacuated.
- July 29, 2014 – United Airlines Flight 345, a Boeing 757, suffered a tailstrike on landing at San Diego International Airport. The aircraft was written off.
- March 4, 2019 – United Express Flight 4933, an Embraer ERJ-145 operated by CommutAir, landed on the snow-covered grass besides the runway at Presque Isle International Airport. 3 people were injured and the aircraft was written off.
- June 15, 2019 – United Airlines Flight 627, a Boeing 757, suffered a hard landing at Newark Liberty International Airport, leading to the aircraft being written off.
