= Fan disk =

Turbofan engine component

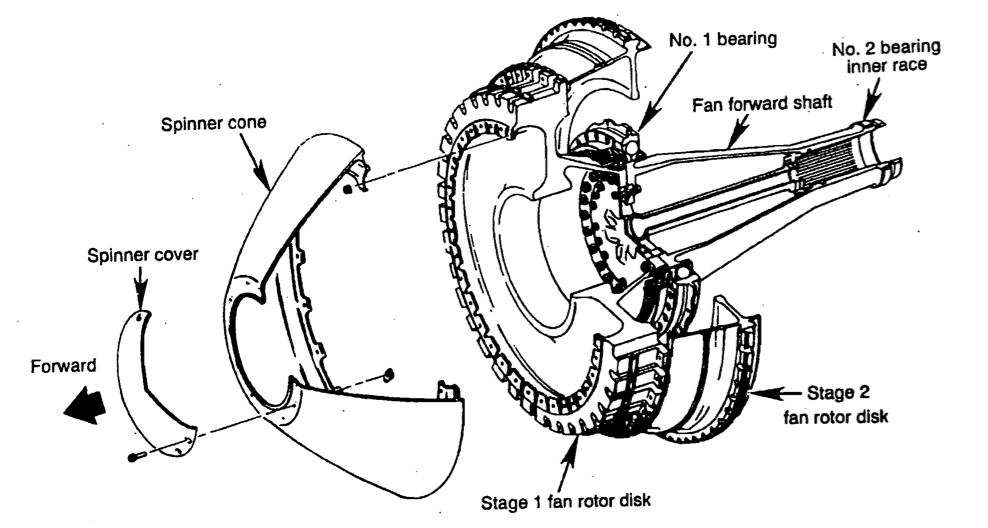
Diagram of a fan disk

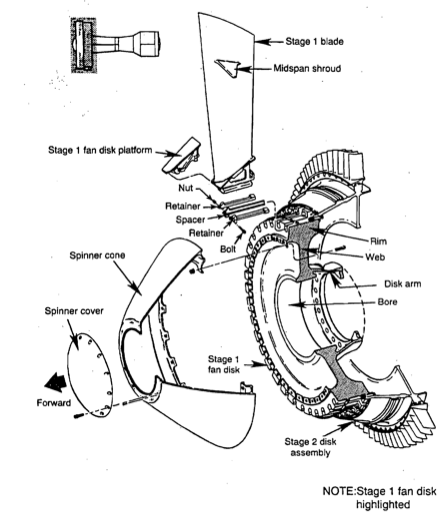
Fan disk assembly diagram, showing one blade and attachment hardware

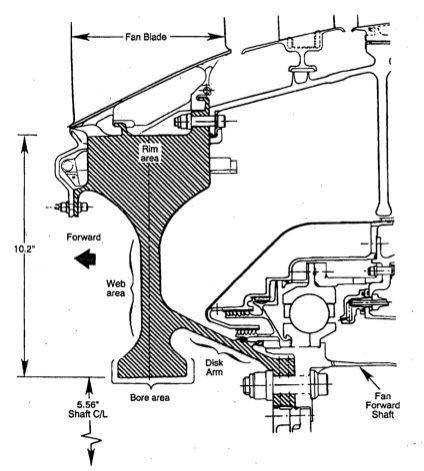
Cross section of fan disk

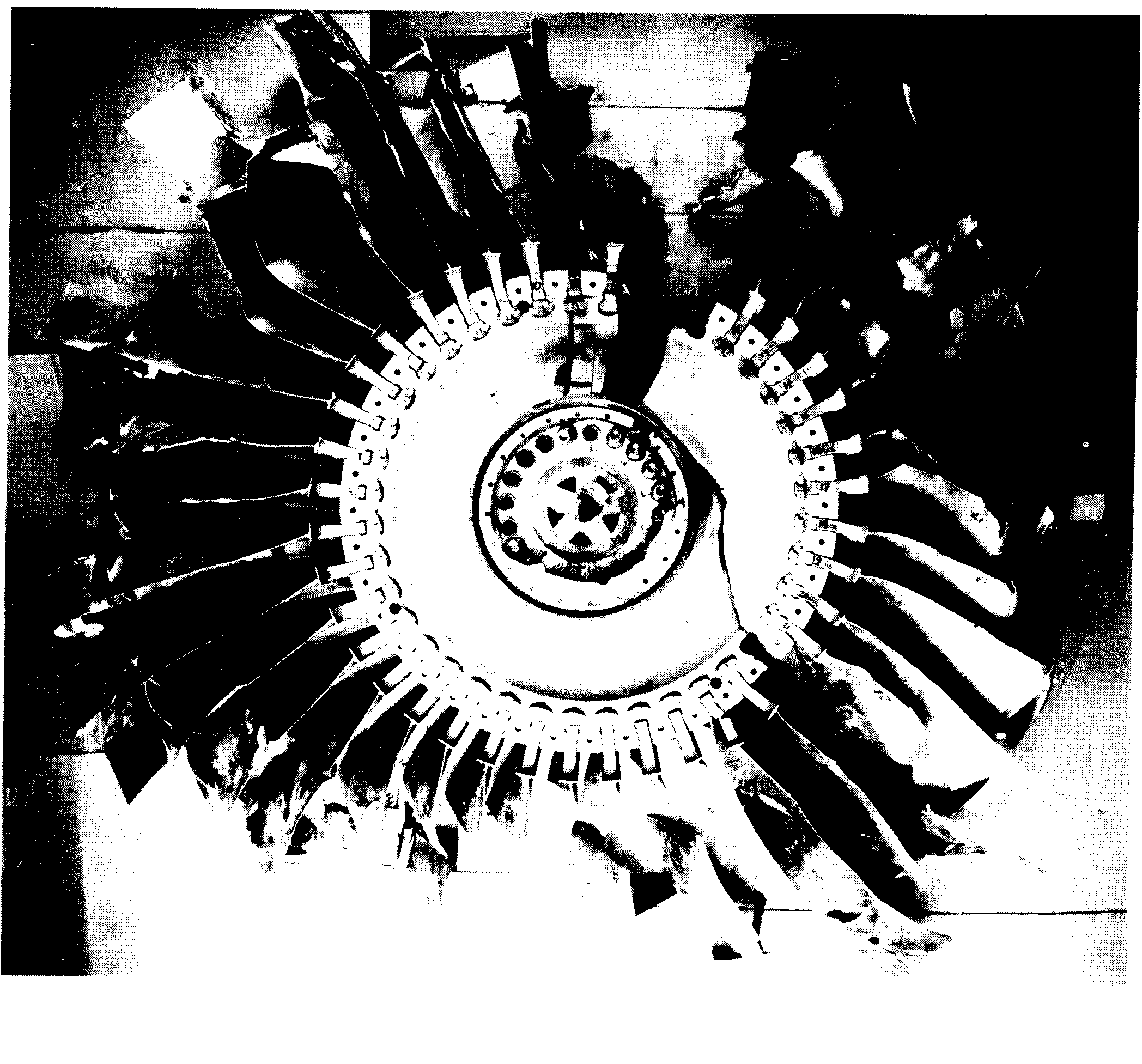
Failed fan disk recovered from the center engine of UAL 232.

A fan disk is the central hub of a fan in a turbofan engine. Fan blades are attached to the fan disk, which is rotated by a shaft driven by a gas turbine. In modern passenger aircraft, most of the propulsive thrust comes from fans, which are driven by gas turbines. A single stage fan was developed to produce high thrust and act as a multi-bladed propeller. Fan disks are attached to a shaft that is driven by a multistage Low Pressure Turbine (LPT) to reduce mechanical stress.

Air enters the front of an engine, where a fan increases the pressure by rotating within a duct. Most of the pressurized air is exhausted through the rear of the engine, where it expands and its velocity increases.

Fan disks are large and heavy. The one shown in the photo is over 31 inches (1.2 m) in diameter, and rotates up to 3800 rotations per minute (RPM). Fan disks must withstand the centrifugal force of the attached fan blades. Because of their size and weight, a failed fan disk can severely damage an aircraft, as happened with United Airlines Flight 232 in 1989. While operating there is increased aerodynamic loading on the fan disk while the fan blade tips are traveling faster than sound. A fan blade weighing 15-lbs can experience upwards of 60 tons of centrifugal force.

Fan disks are usually made of a titanium alloy, which is strong, light weight, and resistant to corrosion.

== See also ==
- United Airlines Flight 232, which crashed after the fan disc in its number two engine shattered and damaged all hydraulic systems
