= Communication Arts =

American trade journal

'Communication Arts'
- Frequency: Bi-monthly
- Format: Magazine; Website
- Circulation: 21,000
- Publisher: Patrick Coyne
- Founder: Richard Coyne; Robert Blanchard
- Founded: 1959
- First issue: August 1959
- Company: Coyne & Blanchard, Inc.
- Country: United States of America
- Based in: Menlo Park, California
- Language: English
- Website: commarts.com
- ISSN: 0010-3519

Communication Arts (acronym: CA) is the largest international trade journal of visual communication. Founded in 1959 by Richard Coyne and Robert Blanchard, the magazine's coverage includes graphic design, advertising, photography, illustration, typography and interactive media. The magazine continues to be edited and published under the guidance of Coyne's son Patrick Coyne. Currently, Communication Arts publishes six issues a year and hosts six creative competitions in graphic design, advertising, photography, illustration, typography and interactive media and two websites, commarts.com and creativehotlist.com.

== History ==
The magazine was established in 1959. The first issue debuted in August 1959 as the Journal of Commercial Art. Among a number of innovations, it was the first U.S. magazine printed by offset lithography.

After Blanchard left to go into business by himself, Coyne, along with his wife Jean and a small staff, continued to write, design, and produce the magazine. Eventually, paid circulation increased to 38,000.

As of 2021, CA's paid circulation was about 21,000, down from 59,429 in 2009.

== Competitions ==
To generate additional income and editorial content, the magazine began an annual juried competition in 1960. Within a few years, the annual competition grew, and eventually segmented into four annual competitions: graphic design, advertising, photography, and illustration. A fifth competition, interactive, was added in 1995 and since early 2011, CA also introduces a typography competition. All the Communication Arts competitions are juried by creative professionals. The judges hand out awards based on creativity and not ROI.

== Websites ==
CA was the first major design publication to launch a web presence in 1995. In addition to showcasing creative work in visual communications, it included job listings. The jobs section grew, and was relaunched in 2001 as a standalone website, Creative Hotlist. These two websites receive approximately three million page views and 250,000 unique visitors per month.
