= Jerry Schemmel =

American sportscaster (born 1959)

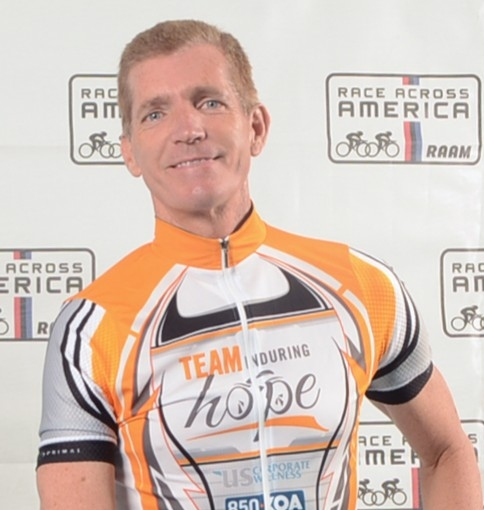
- Schemmel in 2015
- Born: November 26, 1959 (age 66); Madison, South Dakota, U.S.
- Occupations: Broadcaster; Motivational speaker

Gerard H. Schemmel (born November 26, 1959) is an American sportscaster, formerly working as a play-by-play radio announcer for the Colorado Rockies of Major League Baseball. He previously called Denver Nuggets games on both Radio and TV for 18 seasons.

He is a survivor of the United Airlines Flight 232 disaster that occurred on July 19, 1989.

Schemmel is also an endurance cyclist, and holds several state of Colorado cycling records. In 2015, he and cycling partner Brad Cooper won the Two Person Division of the Race Across America. The pair finished 3,062 miles in little over seven days. A documentary about their effort, called Godspeed, was released in 2017.

Schemmel is the author of three books. "Chosen To Live," "The Extravagant Gift," and "Pedaling With Purpose."

== Publications ==
- Schemmel, Jerry; Simpson, Kevin (1996). Chosen to Live: The Inspiring Story of a Flight 232 Survivor. Victory Publishing. ISBN 0-9652086-5-6.
