= Hans Gissinger =

Swiss photographer

Hans Gissinger (born 1946) is a Swiss photographer whose work spans commercial, editorial, and fine-art photography. His photographs have been featured in various publications and projects, including the cover of Michael Pollan's book The Omnivore's Dilemma.

== Early life and education ==
Gissinger was born in Zurich, Switzerland, where he completed his secondary education. Following military service, he traveled throughout Europe, engaging in various professions before returning to Switzerland in 1970 to work in the film and photography department of Pro Helvetia, a Swiss governmental cultural-exchange foundation.

== Career ==
In 1972, Gissinger moved to Vézelay in the Burgundy region of France. There he formed a close friendship with Claude Stassart and his son Gilles Stassart, who would later become key collaborators in his publishing projects.

By 1976, Gissinger had committed fully to photography, establishing a successful career across Switzerland, Germany, Italy, England, and France. He first traveled to Los Angeles in 1987, and later returned to the United States to connect with his art agent. In 1994, he relocated to New York City, where he began developing artistic projects focused on photography and book publication.

In 2000, Gissinger published La Conversation, a photographic book created in collaboration with French chef Marc Meneau, featuring 370 black-and-white photographs and texts by Meneau and Gilles Stassart. His second book, Salami (2001), again in collaboration with Stassart and writer Gérard Oberlé, featured 60 photographic portraits of Italian sausages. Concurrently, Gissinger produced a series of 15 large-format two-color silk screens based on La Conversation.

In 2003, he began working on a new project themed around fire, in collaboration with New York chef Frank De Carlo. Two years later, Gissinger launched Tartas, a project with renowned pastry chef Christian Escribà, celebrating the centenary of the Escribà bakery in Barcelona. The work consisted of photographs and videos of exploding cakes, conceived as a metaphor for lightness, freedom, and subversion of traditional forms.

== Collaborations and commercial work ==
Gissinger has worked with numerous international brands and publications, including Jaguar, Condé Nast, Donna Karan, Nike, Ebel, Cartier, Ruinart Champagne, The New York Times Magazine, Vanity Fair, Vogue, Neiman Marcus, and Lincoln Mercury.

== Exhibitions and collections ==
His photographs have been exhibited individually and as part of group shows in France, the United States, and other countries. Notable solo exhibitions include the Musée de la Chasse et de la Nature (2000) and the Musée de la Citadelle (2004) in Paris. His work is held in several prominent private and public art collections across Europe and the United States.

== Awards and recognition ==
In 2009, Gissinger received a Silver Medal from the Society of Publication Designers for his photographic work in Martha Stewart Living, in an article titled "Exemplary Eggs."

== Personal life ==
Hans Gissinger is based in New York City.

== Bibliography ==
- "La Conversation", Woodstock Editions, 2000 ISBN 0-9703527-0-0
- "Salami ", Woodstock Editions, 2001 ISBN 0-9703527-1-9
