= Andrew Zuckerman =

American filmmaker and photographer (born 1977)

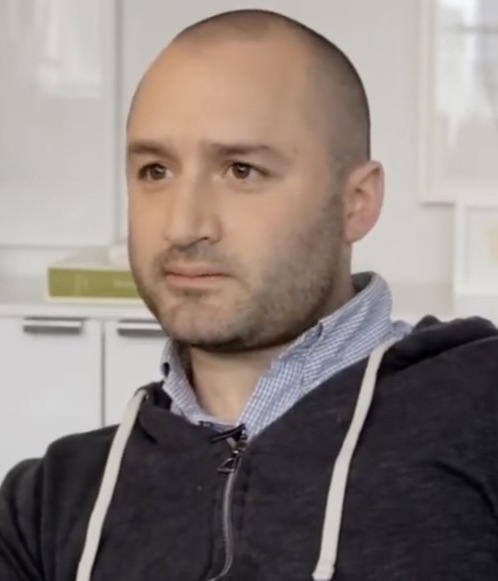
- Zuckerman in 2019
- Born: 1977 (age 48–49)
- Education: School of Visual Arts
- Occupations: Filmmaker, photographer

Andrew Zuckerman (born 1977) is an American filmmaker and photographer working in still life and portrait photography. His subjects included politicians, humanitarians, artists, birds, and endangered species of animals. Using solid white backgrounds and short shutter speeds, he captures images with extreme sharpness and high level of detail.

Zuckerman received his BFA from the School of Visual Arts in 1999. He began his career as a commercial still life photographer, before releasing the book, Creature, a portrait series of animals, in 2007. He has since published four additional volumes: Wisdom (2008), Bird (2009), Music (2010), and Flower (2012). Wisdom and Music were also realized as feature length, interview-format documentary films. In 2006, Zuckerman co-founded a company Late Night and Weekends, through which he released the acclaimed documentary, Still Bill, about the life of Blues musician, Bill Withers, and created campaigns for brands including Puma and Gap.

He produced and directed his first short narrative film, High Falls, starring Maggie Gyllenhaal and Peter Sarsgaard, in 2007. It premiered at the Sundance Film Festival and received the award for best short narrative at the Woodstock Film Festival the same year. Writing for The New York Times, David Carr called the project "a pretty film, and a pretty smart film."

His photographic and film work has been exhibited in solo and group exhibitions internationally.

Zuckerman's brand work for Apple, Inc. has spanned commercials, launch videos, and special projects, including the book, Designed by Apple in California.

== Works, technique and exhibitions ==
Zuckerman has spoken extensively about his interest in systematically collecting and organizing data to create multiple entry points into work that is conceptual in nature. One such system is a comprehensive mobile studio, consisting of fourteen cases of equipment, with which Zuckerman has traveled the world in order to situate all of his subjects in the same space.

In addition to photographers including Richard Avedon and Irving Penn, he cites designers like Massimo and Lella Vignelli and Buckminster Fuller as influences, and has said that his minimalist style is "a function of what I was after conceptually with the work I was creating [and] a solution to a series of desires I have for what I want my work to communicate" rather than an aesthetic choice. He has discussed his use of white as a transportational device that allows him to draw out the essential nature of his subjects.

=== Creature (2007) ===
Zuckerman began exploring his signature approach in Creature. By dispensing with the environmental framework of conventional nature photography, the images focus on the form and character of a specific animal in a specific space, rather than its behavior in a habitat or evolutionary purpose. Zuckerman has said that he drew inspiration from the dioramas at the Museum of Natural History and was interested in creating a kind of two-dimensional taxidermy. The book includes a taxonomical index for each of the species photographed. In 2014, works from the Creature series were displayed as a part of the Nevada Museum of Art's Late Harvest exhibit and two were retained for the museum's permanent collection. Private collectors of Zuckerman's work from the series include the architect Bjarke Ingels, Adam Levine and Behati Prinsloo.

=== Wisdom (2008) ===
Zuckerman applied the same visual language – intimate, close-up portraits against a bright white background – to the Wisdom project, for which he filmed, photographed, and interviewed 60 politicians, artists, entertainers, designers and religious and business leaders over the age of 65, including Chuck Close, Frank Gehry, Judi Dench, Clint Eastwood, Jane Goodall, Desmond Tutu, and Ted Kennedy.

During the making of Wisdom, Zuckerman became interested in the idea of the dynamic portrait, one that incorporates voice, physical presence, and written word. Interviewing subjects around the common themes of love, work, conflict resolution, and the environment, and utilizing a mobile studio, Zuckerman aimed to place his contributors in the same virtual space and conversation, creating what he refers to as a "group of global elders to speak to our global village". The Wisdom traveling exhibit, which premiered at The Library of New South Wales in Sydney, Australia, incorporates text, video, and images from the project, and continues to tour internationally today.

=== Bird (2009) ===
Following the release of Wisdom, Zuckerman began work on Bird. His hyper-detailed photographs of over seventy species nod at John James Audubon's ornithological drawings. In order to capture physical qualities and flight activity rarely visible to the viewer, Zuckerman instituted a variety of techniques, including a custom-built delay system, in which the bird's movement triggered the exposure. In 2012, his photograph of the blue-fronted amazon in flight was included in Florian Heine's Photography: The Groundbreaking Moments. Of Zuckerman's imagery, Heine lauded "the variety and the brilliant colors [which] have never been shown in this way before." The Bird website features a short accompanying film, and incorporates additional data such as wingspan and audio files of each species' call. Both Creature and Bird are informed by a conservationist element, and include portraits of many rare or endangered animals.

=== Music (2010) ===
Music was released as a book, film, and iPad application in 2010, and features portraits of and interviews with musicians from disparate genres, including Lenny Kravitz, Ozzy Osbourne, Herbie Hancock, and Philip Glass. Following the footprint he laid out in Wisdom, Zuckerman touched upon similar themes in interviews with each of his contributors, and the documentary intersects footage of the artists as they discuss performance, collaboration, inspiration, and success.

=== Flower (2012) ===
Returning to his visual survey of the natural world with his 2012 project, Flower, Zuckerman photographed over 230 varieties of flora, drawing inspiration from 19th century botanical drawings. He has expressed his desire to create, with the use of modern technology, "the best possible two-dimensional representation of three-dimensional living things", and to separate his subject from its metaphorical associations in art. Like Creature and Bird, Flower includes a taxonomical index. The project, which filmmaker David Lynch has called "a grand celebration of mother nature's artistry", also incorporates time lapse films of the life cycles of seven different species. The films were created from high definition stills, as opposed to video footage. The 2013 Flowers and Mushrooms show at the Museum de Moderne in Salzburg included four works from the Flower series, along with work by Andy Warhol, David LaChapelle, and Peter Fischli and David Weiss. Zuckerman's flowers were also exhibited at the Museum Schloss Moyland. Zuckerman later developed a line of wallpapers from the photographs, which were acquired for the permanent collections of the Cooper Hewitt Design Museum and the Smithsonian.

Zuckerman has expressed his interest in exploring singular subjects from a multitude of perspectives and engaging his audience across a variety of platforms. In 2016, he engaged in a year-long curation of design objects that reflected the intersection of man and nature at Chamber Gallery in New York.

In 2022, Zuckerman won a Clio award for his photographic collaboration with UNDP and the Lions Share Fund for the Eye to Eye campaign, aimed at catalyzing a movement to preserve global biodiversity.

== Commercial work ==
Zuckerman's brand work has included projects for Puma, BMW, Gap, Gucci, and Tiffany & Co. He collaborated with Apple on product launches and other media, including the book Designed by Apple in California, which collected over 200 of Zuckerman's images of Apple products, from the first iMac through the Apple Watch. According to the 2022 book After Steve, Zuckerman's "work resonated with [Jony] Ive and [Steve] Jobs because he shared their obsessions with perfectionism and minimalism."

== Media company ==
In 2018, Zuckerman launched The Slowdown, a media company he founded with former Surface editor-in-chief Spencer Bailey that "seeks to engage with nature while thinking about our society's relationship to time." The Slowdown produces the podcasts Time Sensitive and At a Distance. Interviews from the latter have been collected and condensed in book form.

== Books ==
- Creature (2007)
- Wisdom (2008)
- Bird (2009)
- Music (2010)
- "Flower" (2012)
- Designed by Apple in California (2016)

== Films ==
- High Falls (2007), Director, Producer
- Wisdom (2008), Director, Producer, Executive Producer
- "Bird" (2009), Director, Producer
- Still BIll (2009), Executive Producer
- Music (2010), Director, Producer, Executive Producer
- "Flower" (2012), Director, Producer

== Exhibitions ==
=== Solo exhibitions ===
- 2007 Creature, Forma International Center of Photography, Milan, Italy
- 2008 Wisdom, State Library of New South Wales, Sydney, Australia
- 2009 Bird Film, High Line, New York City, NY Bird, Colette, Paris, France
- 2010 Bird Film, Institute of Contemporary Art, Boston, MA Bird Film, International Film Festival Breda, Breda, The Netherlands Wisdom Exhibit, World Financial Center, Winter Garden, New York City, NY Wisdom Exhibit, Siamsa Tire Gallery, Dingle, Ireland
- 2011 Wisdom, Bank of America Plaza, Los Angeles, CA Wisdom, Brookfield Place Adam Lambert Galleria, Toronto, CA Wisdom, Bay Adelaide Center, Toronto, CA

=== Group exhibitions ===
- 1999 SVA mentor show
- 2003 Young Guns Show
- 2007 SUNY ULSTER, Muroff Kotler Gallery, Stone Ridge New York, USA
- 2008 Paris Photo, Carrousel du Louvre, Paris, France
- 2011 Obstacle, Invisible Dog Gallery, Brooklyn, NY, USA, Getxphoto Festival, Bilbao, Spain
- 2013 Flowers and Mushrooms, Museum der Moderne, Salzburg, Austria
- 2014 Late Harvest, Nevada Museum of Art, Reno, NV, USA
- 2016 Say It with Flowers, Museum Schloss Moyland, Bedburg-Hau, Germany

== Honors and awards ==
- 2003 Art Directors Club, Young Guns
- 2005 Broadcast Design Award
- 2006 D&AD Yellow Pencil For Photography
- 2007 High Falls, Woodstock Film Festival, Best Short Film
- 2007 High Falls, Sundance Film Festival, Official Selection

== Annuals ==
- 2003 American Photography Annual, Communication Arts Annual
- 2005 Communication Arts Photography Annual, PDN Photography Annual, PDN 30
- 2006 Communication Arts Annual, PDN Photography Annual
- 2007 PDN Digital_Personal, PDN Digital_Music, Graphis Advertising Annual, Graphis Photography Annual, PDN Photography Annual
- 2008 Communication Arts Annual, PDN Photo Annual, Graphis Photography Annual
- 2009 American Photography 25, Communication Arts Annual
- 2010 Graphis Photography Annual, American Photography 26, PDN Photo Annual, Communication Arts, D&AD Annual
- 2011 Graphis Photography Annual, 100 Best in Photography

== Video links ==
- Creature Behind the Scenes
- Wisdom Trailer
- Wisdom Behind the Scenes
- Bird Film
- Bird Behind the Scenes
- Music Trailer
- Music Making of Footage
- Andrew Zuckerman on Ellen
- Creative Mornings Talk
- Zuckerman on Carson Daly
- Zuckerman at the 2011 99% Conference
