= I Survived... =

TV documentary

- Genre: Documentary, reality
- Original language: English
- No. of seasons: 6
- No. of episodes: 68

Production
- Running time: 60 minutes (including commercials); 1 hour, 30 minutes (9/11 episode)

Original release
- Network: The Biography Channel (Seasons 1-5); Lifetime Movie Network (current)
- Release: March 24, 2008 – January 26, 2015

I Survived... is a documentary television series produced by NHNZ that aired on Lifetime Movie Network and, as of 2022, can be seen on Court TV.

The show allows survivors to explain in their own words how they overcame life-threatening circumstances without dramatic reenactments. Most episodes feature two or three separate stories involving scenarios such as kidnapping, assaults, or getting injured or stranded in a remote location. The format shows the survivor speaking into the camera to describe their experiences, with occasional use of title cards to summarize events or photographs of locations or people mentioned by the narrators.

The official website states:

What would you do if you were confronted with death? What gives someone the strength to survive? Is it luck, chance, instinct? In a stripped-down, simple-yet-cinematic interview style, I Survived... allows survivors to explain, in their own words, how they overcame unbelievable circumstances – offering insight into what got them through the experience that changed their lives forever. I Survived... is storytelling at its most dramatic, most basic, and most honest.

The series premiered on March 24, 2008 and aired its last episode on January 26, 2015. Its sister series "I Survived... Beyond and Back" (in which people share their near death experiences) debuted in 2011.

== Episodes ==
Season	Episodes	Originally aired	Season premiere	Season finale
1	11	2008	March 24, 2008	June 16, 2008
2	18	2008–2009	December 1, 2008	August 30, 2009
3	26	2009–2011	December 6, 2009	January 30, 2011
4	30	2011–2012	May 5, 2011	September 30, 2012
5	26	2012–2013	October 7, 2012	July 21, 2013
6	6	2014–2015	December 12, 2014	January 26, 2015

=== Season 1 ===
No.	Title	Original release date
1	"Bridget/Daryl/Ryan and John"	March 24, 2008
Bridget, a schoolteacher from Killeen, Texas, is attacked by an intruder in her apartment, raped, shot three times, and left for dead in a desert field; Daryl is traveling to a camp in Mount Adams, Washington, when a freak snowstorm buries him alive in his Jeep, as he tries to survive on meager rations of food and water and freezing temperatures for two weeks; and two teenagers, Ryan and John, return from a concert in Oklahoma with their friend Ryan S. and his father Mark, when the plane they are traveling on crashes in a remote forest in Wichita, Kansas, killing Ryan S. and Mark. Ryan and John survive, but suffer serious injuries and must maintain phone contact with a 911 operator while rescue teams desperately try to find them.
2	"Brandi/Joseph/Sam and Suzanne"	March 31, 2008
In New Philadelphia, Ohio, Brandi and her friend Liz are preparing for a sleepover when they meet a man at a local video store, and they both offer a ride. During the trip, the man turns on them, threatening the girls at gunpoint, fatally stabbing Liz, repeatedly sexually assaulting Brandi, and then throwing her into a river to leave her to die. Joseph, his friend Lorenzo, and an unlicensed guide, Jose, are stranded on a rocky, desolate island in the Sea of Cortez for 13 days, with the three fishermen surviving without fresh water, hot and cold temperatures, and shark-infested waters. Sam and Suzanne, a couple from Fort Smith, Arkansas, return from a funeral, and pick up a hitchhiker, who kidnaps them and forces them to drive hundreds of miles, at gunpoint. The gunman turns out to be a criminal wanted for murder in Oklahoma.
3	"Christine and Heidi/Debbie/Jim"	April 7, 2008
Christine and Heidi's trip on the Greek ferry MS Express Samina turns into a nightmare when the ship begins to sink after hitting a rock in the Aegean Sea, and the crew abandons ship, leaving panicked passengers to fend for themselves. Debbie, a resident of Newark, Delaware, endures a five-day ordeal, kidnapped by an attacker who murdered her husband, Nino, and kept blindfolded and gagged, raped and forced to sleep beside him. Jim, an elderly resident of an apartment in Rockford, Illinois, invites his neighbor Tom to speak, and is seriously injured in a brutal attack, carried out by him due to his cocaine influence.
4	"Lonnie/Rulon/Stanley"	April 14, 2008
Lonnie, a resident of Portland, Oregon, plays dead for four agonizing hours after her boyfriend, Michael, strangles her and shoots her four times in the head after she discovers that he has committed insurance fraud with her card. Rulon, a super-strong Olympic wrestler, becomes trapped in a half-frozen stream in Star Valley, Wyoming, when he sets out on a snowmobile and is faced with a big decision, abandoning the vehicle and walking across the frozen stream, without food, water, or cell phone, and suffering from hypothermia and frostbite. Stanley, a resourceful federal prosecutor from Manhattan, New York, is kidnapped by men with machine guns and uses his unique talents and personality to appear sympathetic to his captors in the hopes that they will release him.
5	"Denise/Nick/Leonilda"	April 21, 2008
Denise, a dollar store manager, is savagely attacked by two robbers in Jacksonville, North Carolina, while trying to rob the safe, and she is repeatedly stabbed and slashed. Nick, a former Marine from San Francisco, must survive for several days in cold temperatures when he is stranded on a mountain in Lake Tahoe in the middle of a snowstorm without a cell phone, without food and without winter clothing, while he was skiing. In Reading, Pennsylvania, Leonilda is kidnapped by her violent ex-boyfriend, Luis, who thinks he has been cheating on her, and shot six times while trying to hide in a parked truck.
6	"Wayne and Mary/Holly/Linda"	April 28, 2008
Wayne and Mary, a farming couple from Macdona, Texas, wake up to find their farmhouse surrounded by a cloud of deadly chlorine gas following a train derailment. The couple, along with their families and pets, begin a harrowing six-hour ordeal for emergency services to arrive, where they struggle to breathe, cough up blood, and watch their metal appliances literally melt before their eyes. While Holly and her boyfriend Chris take a quiet walk near the train tracks in Lexington, Kentucky, after leaving a college party, they are greeted by a man who demands money. Both are tied up, gagged and then brutally beaten. Chris dies at the scene, but Holly miraculously survives the rape and being stabbed in the neck, and tries to seek help. What Holly doesn't know is that the man is serial killer Angel Maturino Resendiz. Linda is driving home from work to her lakeside cabin in Canyon County, Idaho, when she is run off the road in the middle of the night by four strangers. High on drugs, they brutally attack her, demand money from her, set fire to her car and abandon her in a deserted field, leaving her for dead. She is rescued by two passing teenagers who witness the blaze.
7	"Cari/Kevin/Joe and Katherine"	May 12, 2008
Cari, a young mother living in Chico, California, is brutally stabbed, beaten, and sexually assaulted by an intruder in her home, but knows she must survive the attack to save her 3-year-old son. While working on an old cemetery in Clarksville, California, a four-inch steel tow hook accidentally lodges in Kevin's throat, and any movement could sever his jugular vein and end his life. When a gunman shoots and wounds several people in Tacoma Mall, Washington, during the Christmas season, Katherine, a music store manager, must obey his demands or risk having her co-worker Joe, also an Iraq War veteran, a customer and a boy taken hostage, be shot at point-blank range in the head with a machine gun.
8	"Michelle/Troy and Josh"	May 19, 2008
Three armed, masked men break into Michelle's home in Needles, California, then strap dynamite to the bodies of the bank executive, her daughter, 7-year-old Breea, and her roommate, and order her to rob the bank vault where she works or they will blow up her young daughter. Teenagers Troy and Josh take a small sailboat to an inlet near Charleston, South Carolina, to go fishing when they get caught in a dangerous current and are swept out to sea for six days. They must fight to survive against rough seas, freezing temperatures at night, scorching temperatures during the day, and sharks that keep circling their boat.
9	"Maria/Jerry/Melissa"	June 2, 2008
Maria, a nurse manager at a hospital in Norristown, Pennsylvania, fears for her safety when one of her coworkers, Denis Czajkowski, becomes increasingly erratic and volatile. She gets him fired, but two months later, Denis breaks into her office with a gun, shoots Maria and her colleague Carol, and holds them hostage for three days. While driving in a deserted area outside Fort Worth, Texas, Jerry, a defense lawyer, swerves his car to avoid a deer and crashes into an embankment where a tree branch lodges in his throat. Barely alive, he survives two days in the ravine until he finally manages to crawl to the side of the road, where he is spotted and saved. Melissa and her two-year-old daughter are sleeping at their home in Grand Rapids, Michigan, when she is awakened by an armed intruder. The man stabs her with a knife and sexually assaults her before stuffing her into the trunk of his car. He then drives for hours, picks up his friends, and assaults her again. He eventually abandons the car, leaving a terrified and injured Melissa to drive home to her abandoned daughter.
10	"Virginia Tech Massacre/Minneapolis School Bus Crash"	June 9, 2008
On April 16, 2007, Seung-Hui Cho, a student at Virginia Tech in Blacksburg, Virginia, opened fire inside a classroom building, killing 33 students and teachers, and wounding 23. Derek and Colin, two students, were shot and witnessed their classmates and teachers being brutally murdered. Ishwar, a professor, hid in his office, from the massacre occurring outside in the hallways. Derek and his classmates tried to block the classroom door to prevent the gunman from entering, and Colin played dead as the gunman shot him four times before taking his own life. On August 1, 2007, Kim, a school bus driver, is taking 53 children and 8 adults, including her daughter Arrianna, during a school trip in Minneapolis, Minnesota. As the bus was crossing the I-35W Mississippi River Bridge, it collapsed, sending vehicles into the river below, killing 13 people. The bus plummeted 45 feet, trapping Kim in her seat, with serious injuries. As she holds the brakes to prevent the bus from falling backwards, Jimmy, one of the counselors evacuated the children and adults from the bus, saving everyone on board.
11	"Jennifer/Sampson/Norina"	June 16, 2008
Jennifer, a young lawyer living in an apartment in Houston, Texas, is assaulted by a security guard, who slashes her face and tries to sexually assault her. She must use all her instincts to fight him off, hiding in the bathroom, and refusing to open the door to a security guard, as she speaks to the 911 operator. Sampson is a corn farmer in Kershaw County, South Carolina, who faces the agonizing decision of amputating his arm or risking burning to death when his hand becomes trapped in a burning combine. Norina, an elementary school principal in Winterstown, Pennsylvania, must fight off a crazed machete-wielding man to save the lives of her students, being attacked and wounded several times.

=== Season 2 ===
No.	Title	Original release date
1(12)	"Dan and Danielle/James and David/Karli"	December 1, 2008
Dan and Danielle are having a second romantic date, walking near a river in Goldsboro, Pennsylvania, when they are attacked by a man who forces them into his truck, at gunpoint, sexually attacks Danielle, and shoots both of them, throwing their bodies into the river. A snowmobile ride in Chippewa Falls, Wisconsin, ends in a near-death experience for brothers James and David, after the ice on a frozen river breaks, causing them both to fall into cold water. Karli, a woman from Chicago, Illinois, is attacked in the parking lot of her apartment by a gang, who burn her with battery acid and lock her in the trunk of their car. Two months later, Karli moves to Evanston, Illinois, only to be attacked with battery acid again, by the same people that attacked her in Chicago.
2(13)	"Reverend Albert/Lois"	December 8, 2008
Reverend Albert along with his family, are fishing in Port Arthur, Texas, when their boat capsizes due to bad weather, and they become trapped in cold waters for more than 13 hours. Albert's wife, Carolyn, and his two sons-in-law Chris and Cedric succumb to hypothermia, but he and his two daughters Leatrice and Cherie survive the tragedy. Lois, a prison officer at the Arizona State Prison in Buckeye, is taken hostage along with her partner, Officer Jason, in a guard tower, by inmate, Ricky Wassenaar, posing as a prison officer, and his partner, inmate, Steven Coy. Lois is sexually assaulted by both inmates, and Jason is beaten by a metal paddle. Being in her tower for 15 days, Lois survived the longest prison hostage siege in US history.
3(14)	"Jewish Federation/Alberto/Tamara"	December 15, 2008
Cheryl, Layla and Carol are three employees of the Jewish Federation of Greater Seattle, Washington. One Friday, Naveed Haq, a Pakistani man, breaks into the offices, shooting 6 female workers, killing director Pamela Waechter, and wounding Cheryl, Layla, Carol, and two other workers inside. Haq carries out a hostage situation demanding an end to the Iraq War and U.S support for Israel, before surrendering to the authorities. Alberto, a former law enforcement officer from Corpus Christi, Texas, survives an attempted murder by a criminal who breaks into his home, being shot several times. Three months later, he is food poisoned by Elizabeth Reynolds, a woman who frequently harassed him and plotted against him to commit murder. In Ormond Beach, Florida, Tamara along with her three friends Christy, Daniel and Randy, become trapped in shark-infested water after their boat sinks in a storm. Suffering from dehydration, exhaustion and exposure, Tamara tries to swim to shore, and her friend Christy is killed by sharks.
4(15)	"Christi/Fred/Maria"	December 22, 2008
Christi, a single mother from Fort Smith, Arkansas, visits a bar late at night, and is kidnapped, raped, stabbed with a screwdriver, and left for dead in a ravine, by three criminals, with her seriously injured, trying to get help. Fred, a long-haul trucker, must drive his 40-ton truck through the largest fire in Utah history, surviving the searing heat on the highway. Maria, a woman from Independence, Missouri, is stalked by her ex-boyfriend Michael for six months, until one night he shoots her and kidnaps her into his car, traveling at 70 mph on a highway. With no other options, Maria makes the decision to jump out of the car at high speed, to flee from him and run for help.
5(16)	"Jackie/Todd/Stephanie"	January 5, 2009
Jackie, a teacher takes EgyptAir Flight 648 from Athens to Cairo along with 86 passengers on board. After taking off from Athens, three hijackers from the terrorist organization, Abu Nidal (the show mistakenly mentions five), hijack the flight, starting a gunfight with an armed sky marshal on board, causing the plane to make an emergency landing in Malta. After landing, the hijacker Omar Rezaq executes 5 passengers, including Jackie who is shot in the skull, but she survives and is rescued by paramedics. Unfortunately, 56 passengers are killed when Egyptian commandos storm the plane shooting the hijackers. Todd is surfing on a beach in Monterey, California, when he is brutally attacked by a great white shark that clamps its jaws all over his body and shakes him around like a ragdoll, tearing his back and one of his legs. He manages to escape after a pod of dolphins approaches the shark, and he loses much of his blood. Stephanie, a young single mother from Cincinnati, Ohio, is sleeping with her 3-year-old son when she is sexually assaulted and strangled by an intruder who turns out to be her friend's husband, Lou.
6(17)	"Jim and Nell/Jennifer/Tammi"	January 12, 2009
While on a hike in a state forest in Orick, California, elderly couple, Jim and Nell, are attacked by a ferocious 6-foot mountain lion. The mountain lion brutally begins to bite Jim's head, and Nell must try to find a solution to save her husband. In Lufkin, Texas, Jennifer and her 16-year-old cousin Ana are driving at midnight when their car is shot at by a nearby driver. The gunman shoots both girls, killing Ana, and kidnapping Jennifer, taking her to the woods to sexually assault her. Tammi, a mother from Shelbyville, Indiana, stops at a gas station to buy some snacks, only to be held hostage by a fugitive criminal who threatens her at gunpoint in front of the police for 20 hours.
7(18)	"Darren and Chastity/Ryan/Julie"	January 19, 2009
Darren, his wife Chastity, and their 11-year-old son Dustin live in a semi-rural area of Madera, California. One night, the family suffers a home invasion by members of the Nazi Lowriders gang, who believe Darren is a drug dealer. The criminals fracture Darren's skull with a metal bat, ransack the house, inject Dustin with meth, and lock the family in the bathroom for 24 hours. Ryan, a railroad station worker in Allentown, Pennsylvania, witnesses six runaway gasoline tankers run out of control down a hill toward a rail yard full of deadly chemicals, causing Ryan to make the decision to climb aboard the cars to stop them, thus preventing a tragedy that could affect the entire town. Julie, a real estate agent from St. Petersburg, Florida, is violently attacked in a vacant home by a client who turns out to be a convicted criminal, who has a manifesto of murdering female real estate agents.
8(19)	"Donna/Danelle/Robert and Ana"	February 2, 2009
Donna, a convenience store clerk in rural Pasadena, Maryland, is kidnapped by a man he claims knows her sister, and takes her into the woods to rape her, stab her, and bury her in a pit of sand and gravel, with her playing dead, to escape and survive. Danelle, an endurance athlete, is jogging with her dog Taz in the canyons of Moab, Utah, when she slips on ice and falls down a 60-foot cliff, fracturing her pelvis in four pieces. For three days, Danelle, seriously injured and bleeding, must survive with her dog in the cold temperatures, waiting for help. In Pocatello, Idaho, Ana and Robert return home with their three children after a weekend away, and that night, the couple is awakened by an intruder in their room who threatens them with a gun, and Robert must think of a plan to save his wife and three children who must flee the house.
9(20)	"Kelly/Rose/Lt. Prescott and Gwen"	February 9, 2009
Kelly, a mother of three from Perrinton, Michigan is attacked one night by her estranged husband, Don, who beats, rapes and tortures her in a van and in their basement. Months later, after her case is dismissed by the police, Don breaks into her home and shoots her twice in the head before beating her again. Rose, a newly pregnant quality control officer on a fish processing vessel in the Bering Sea, suffers a gruesome accident where her legs are caught and mutilated in a fish processing machine during a storm. Gwen, a librarian at the Salt Lake City Public Library in Utah, is held hostage along with others for over six hours by Clifford Lynn Draper, who demands money and gold or else he will detonate a bomb. Lt. Lloyd Prescott, who witnesses the situation in his office near the library, decides to enter the building and act as a hostage, in order to prevent the gunman from murdering everyone.
10(21)	"Sarah/Sherman and Dee Ann/Ellen"	February 16, 2009
Sarah, a 9-month pregnant woman from Fort Mitchell, Kentucky, receives a mysterious call from a woman claiming that she received an incorrect package in her name, which is also "Sarah." Sarah goes to the woman's house, and the woman, revealing herself to be Katie, begins to attack her with a hunting knife, in an attempt to remove her unborn baby. Sherman and Dee Ann, a couple from Crystal Beach, Texas, cling to the attic rafters of their home as Hurricane Ike destroys the coast with high winds and large waves. The next morning, the couple remains trapped in the ruins for three days, waiting for rescue. Ellen, a housewife from Austin, Texas, is brutally attacked by a man in a ninja suit who has been hiding in her attic for several days, blindfolding her, tying her up, raping, stabbing, and hammering her multiple times.
11(22)	"Teri/Angela/Ed"	July 12, 2009
Teri, a mother from Wind Lake, Wisconsin, is brutally beaten by her ex-husband David with a baseball bat in his home, then leaves her body locked in a snow-filled trash can, then left to die in a storage garage so that he can gain custody of their two daughters. Angela and her family are trapped in a grotesque pile of bodies after an escalator at a stadium in Denver, Colorado, malfunctions, leaving her with serious injuries. Ed, a bartender from Manhattan, New York is brutally stabbed on a street, by three young men, members of a Latino gang, as a gang initiation.
12(23)	"Alfred, Jan and Jerry/Ebony"	July 19, 2009
Three survivors, Captain Alfred 'Al' Haynes, senior flight attendant Jan Brown Lohr, and passenger Jerry Schemmel, recount their survival from the crash of United Airlines Flight 232, one of the worst airline accidents in the United States at the time. During a flight between Denver and Chicago, the tail engine exploded mid-flight due to a malfunction, causing the plane to lose control and crash during an emergency landing at the Sioux City, Iowa, airport, killing 112 people. Ebony, a 16-year-old teenager from Alexandria, Virginia, is brutally raped by two Salvadoran men as she walks home from roller skating with her friends, and she does everything she can to escape her attackers.
13(24)	"April/Mark/Jesse"	July 26, 2009
April, a young girl from Paris, Tennessee, is brutally beaten and raped by Virgil, the friend of her ex-boyfriend Brandon. After Brandon escapes, leaving April alone, she is locked in the trunk of her car and set on fire, sustaining serious injuries. Mark, an oil worker from southeastern Illinois, has his right leg brutally amputated after getting trapped in an oil well drive shaft. After doing an act of kindness, giving a ride to two hitchhikers and their dog, Jesse is brutally beaten by the two men with a sledgehammer as he drives through a freak snowstorm. While trying to escape, the two men steal his van and run him over, leaving him for dead in a remote area of Pampa, Texas.
14(25)	"Jens and Jim/Dawn/Agnes"	August 2, 2009
Two friends, Jim and Jens, and their fathers, fly to Loreto, Mexico, for fishing, but turbulence and bad weather cause the plane to crash into the Sea of Cortez. The four men are trapped for 24 hours in the water, and Jens does his best to swim to land, in order to find help. Dawn and her two daughters are minding a beach house in Norfolk, Virginia, when they are robbed by four men who break into the home, threatening to kill her two daughters if she does not collaborate with them. Dawn attempts to escape, only to be shot five times, leaving her paralyzed from the chest down. Agnes, a night shift convenience store worker in Winnie, Texas, is kidnapped by a gunman, who takes her to his car in a rural area, and she is sexually assaulted for three hours, along with another kidnapped woman named Barbara who was locked in the trunk of the car. The gunman murders Barbara, and shoots Agnes, leaving her temporarily blinded and left for dead in a countryside area.
15(26)	"Brent/Susan/Denise"	August 9, 2009
Brent, a surveyor working in a forest in Bella Coola, British Columbia, is brutally attacked by a grizzly bear, which tears his scalp and arms. To escape from the creature, Brent decides to play dead. In Jacksonville, Florida, Susan is robbed in her home by three armed robbers who shoot her and her husband Mike. In an attempt to save her husband, Susan decides to start a gun fight against the three robbers. Denise, a woman from Houston, Texas, is brutally beaten and raped in her apartment by a man posing as a building maintenance man.
16(27)	"Patrick/Reneé/Sharon"	August 16, 2009
Patrick and his diving buddy are spearfishing in Port St. Lucie, Florida, when a strong rip current drags Patrick away from shore, leaving him stranded for 23 hours in the ocean. He is battered by strong waves and sustains severe injuries to his right hand after a rescue device detonates. Renee, a woman from Zanesville, Ohio, is robbed at gunpoint in her home by her best friend, Eva, and her brother, Terry, who also try to kidnap her. Sharon, a Coconut Creek, Florida woman, is driving when she is shot in the face by a nearby driver, leaving her permanently blinded. The same man who shot her takes her to his apartment, assuming he is taking her to the hospital, only to kidnap and rape her, stab her twice, and slice her abdomen.
17(28)	"Timothy/Scott and Sean/Stacey"	August 23, 2009
Timothy, a family man, is walking his dog in the woods of Tetonia, Idaho, when he comes face to face with a grizzly bear that begins to attack him, tearing his scalp, and leaving him seriously injured. Timothy decides to play dead, and his dog decides to scare the creature away. Scott and Sean are enjoying some time fishing on the Appalachian Trail in Virginia, when a drifter lurking in the woods, which they invite over for a meal, starts shooting at them, leaving them both with serious injuries, and causing them to flee the woods in their truck for help. Scott and Sean are unaware that the drifter murdered two hikers 27 years earlier in the same place. After moving into an apartment in Queens, New York, Stacey and her best friend are robbed and raped by a man who breaks into their home, and begins threatening to cut them into pieces if they don't obey his commands.
18(29)	"Dr. Roger and Dena/Sydney/Jennifer"	August 30, 2009
Roger and Dena live in their dream house in the San Pasqual Valley of Escondido, California. Everything is going well until one day, they both decide to hide and survive in their swimming pool, after a firestorm destroys their home completely. Sydney, a 15-year-old teenager from Gary, Indiana, decides to jump off the balcony of her apartment in order to escape from her two captors who robbed her home when she was alone, shot her and sexually assaulted her. Jennifer, a single mother from East Marlborough, Pennsylvania, breaks up with her possessive boyfriend Kenny, only to have him break into her home with the intention of killing her and then committing suicide. Jennifer is shot in the leg and tries to help her 8-year-old son Matt call 911 as they are held hostage by Kenny for three hours.
*	"Death and Back"	August 30, 2009
This special profiles the extraordinary stories of three ordinary people who literally died and then came back to life. Deb's heart stops shortly after delivering her second child, Steve is brutally stabbed by his schizophrenic brother, and Michaela is severely injured in a deadly car accident--each one literally flatlines, yet has inexplicable but very real experiences while they are clinically dead.

=== Season 3 ===
No.	Title	Original release date
1(29)	"Mary/Brooke/Sharene"	December 6, 2009
A young runaway in Modesto, California, has her arms cut off by a man in a horrific assault. A pregnant woman and her father flee a deadly firestorm in Marysville, Australia. A Fallbrook, California, woman survives multiple stab wounds in a drug-fuelled attack by her enraged boyfriend.
2(30)	"Terry/Anne and Debi/Earleen"	December 13, 2009
An Emory, Texas, man's family suffers a deadly home invasion arranged by his own daughter. Two mountain bikers are mauled by a mountain lion along a remote trail in Mission Viejo, California. A hotel receptionist in Columbus, Mississippi, goes into fight mode to survive a brutal attack by a man posing as a guest.
3(31)	"Maggie/Gary/Barbara"	December 20, 2009
A 15-year-old girl is snatched off the street in Galion, Ohio, on an early morning run. A man goes head-to-head with a killer chimpanzee in Sierra Leone, and a woman working in a restaurant in Davie, Florida, is shot and left for dead in a freezer with two slain co-workers.
4(32)	"Jessyca/Derek/LaToya"	January 3, 2010
A 13-year-old girl from Eau Claire, Wisconsin, Jessyca Mullenberg, is kidnapped and held captive by her neighbor Steven Oliver who has sexually assaulted her numerous times before. A man crawls down Mount Adams in Washington state after breaking his ankle. A pregnant woman, Carnomas "LaToya" Manning, is attacked in Memphis, Tennessee, by her jealous meth-addicted neighbor, Jacqueline Hurt.
5(33)	"Ron and Jill/Randy/Julie"	January 10, 2010
A Fort Worth, Texas, couple fight for their lives in a terrifying home invasion. A lineman is electrically shocked while working alone up a 35-foot power pole in Rowley, Iowa. A Charlotte, North Carolina, woman makes a desperate dash for safety after being repeatedly stabbed by her ex-boyfriend.
6(34)	"Rudrani/Tracey/Teresa"	January 17, 2010
A woman is left for dead when two terrorists storm the Mumbai hotel that she is staying in. A 14-year-old girl saves her brother when their Long Island home is destroyed in a tragic house fire. A Redwater, Texas, woman is left permanently scarred in a deadly domestic abuse incident.
7(35)	"Verna/Theo/Debra"	January 24, 2010
A single mom living in Ball Ground, Georgia, is attacked by an old classmate after spurning his affections. A gold prospector survives five days in the Outback. A woman is left for dead in the woods outside Fayetteville, North Carolina, after being carjacked and then shot several times at close range.
8(36)	"Christine/Mike/Chris"	January 31, 2010
In Fort Lauderdale, Florida, a doctor's assistant is violently attacked at home by a former patient whom she spurned several years earlier. A Pine Mountain, Georgia, man is attacked by a swarm of hornets on the roof of his holiday home and falls down a 100-foot bank. A man in Blue Springs, Missouri, is shot and assaulted by his girlfriend when he tries to end their relationship.
9(37)	"Franklin/Jeff and Frank/Connie"	February 14, 2010
A husband and wife survive the crash of Ethiopian Airlines Flight 961 that killed 125 passengers and crew after 3 men hijack it. A heroic rescue bid goes horribly wrong when 2 police officers are stranded on an iceberg with several other people on frigidly cold Lake Saint Clair. A woman is beaten, raped, and left for dead after 2 men break into her remote Tyler, Texas, farmhouse and kill her husband.
10(38)	"Brandy/Steve/James"	February 21, 2010
In Aurora, Colorado, a 16-year-old girl and her deaf friend Jeff are abducted and assaulted by two gunmen. The gunmen shot at Jeff, who escaped unhurt and raped Brandy before driving into a pole. A Fredericksburg, Texas, deer hunter drags himself up a dry creek bed after falling out of a tree and breaking both legs. A college student is used as a human shield by a gunman.
11(39)	"Susan/John and Jean/Penny"	July 25, 2010
A woman fights an intruder in her Portland, Oregon, home and kills him only to find out that he was hired by her husband. A family survives the wreck of their catamaran in shark-infested waters. A restaurant manager in Evansville, Indiana, is sexually assaulted and beaten before her attacker attempts to drown her.
12(40)	"Glen/Barbara"	July 25, 2010
A man from California survives after being taken hostage by Marxist rebels in Colombia by pretending that he's dying. In Spring Lake, North Carolina, two abducted teenage girls are sexually assaulted and brutally stabbed. One is found dead on the scene, but the other survives this horrific event and lives to tell her story.
13(41)	"Stephanie/Rick and Laura/Craig and Crystal"	August 1, 2010
A Puyallup, Washington, a woman is shot in the head and wounded three times by her abusive ex-husband. A family is attacked by bees at Sequoia National Park. Two survivors of the Columbine High School massacre in Columbine, Colorado, tell their stories of survival.
14(42)	"Alga/Blaine/Lincoya"	August 8, 2010
An elderly woman living in Altus, Oklahoma, is abducted, bludgeoned, stabbed, and locked in the trunk of her car by a church acquaintance. Miners are trapped for 77 hours in a flooded coal mine in Lincoln Township, Somerset County, Pennsylvania. A student and his roommate are held hostage by two gunmen in Nashville, Tennessee.
15(43)	"Frederic/Henry and Becky/Missy and Mandy"	August 15, 2010
A family from Tampa, Florida, is stranded on a plane in flight when the pilot collapses. A boy witnesses his mother being attacked during a home invasion in Los Angeles. In Paducah, Kentucky, teen twin sisters become survivors of the 1997 Heath High School shooting when they are caught in the middle of a fellow student's shooting rampage.
16(44)	"Sharon/Al and Linda/Misty"	August 22, 2010
A North Aurora, Illinois, woman is assaulted by Brian Dugan, a man who had murdered before. A father falls through the ice during a family snowmobiling trip in Coös County, New Hampshire. Two teenage girls have an encounter with a killer in Abbotsford, British Columbia.
19 (Season 2)	"Phillip/Tunnelers/Karen"	August 29, 2010
A missionary working in Haiti is shot and held for ransom by a gang. In Fall River, Massachusetts, a man goes into a flooding underground cavity to rescue two co-workers. A man viciously assaults his wife in Yonkers, New York.
17(45)	"Danielle/Deborah/Gordy and Betty"	September 12, 2010
A 17-year-old girl from Schenectady, New York, is attacked in her home by her mother's boyfriend, who cuts her throat. A sailor survives at sea after the yacht that she's on sinks in shark-infested waters. An elderly couple is held hostage in their Owatonna, Minnesota, home by an escaped convict.
18(46)	"Albert/Matt/Kristie"	September 19, 2010
A soldier at Fort Bragg is attacked by a fellow soldier who wants to kill him. A climber breaks his leg and survives in the New Zealand mountains for 11 days. In Manassas, Virginia, a 14-year-old girl comes home to find her sister murdered by a killer who's still in the house.
19(47)	"Cults"	December 5, 2010
A girl becomes a sex slave after her parents sell their Ogden, Utah, pharmacy to join a Mormon split-off cult. A Miami, Florida, man is brainwashed by a cult and does whatever he can to stay alive when the prophet begins to kill innocent people. A young woman in Fouke, Arkansas, breaks free from a violent religious organization in which she was raised after she is brutally beaten with a log and sexually tortured by the prophet, who accuses her of killing his wife.
20(48)	"Tere/Christa/Brian"	December 12, 2010
An 11-year-old girl is stranded on a sinking yacht in the Bahamas. An aid worker in Haiti is buried alive in the aftermath of an earthquake. A Jackson, Mississippi, truck driver's cab is invaded by armed men.
21(49)	"Gracia/Michelle/Richard"	December 19, 2010
A couple is kidnapped in the Philippines by Islamic militants. A Kamiah, Idaho, woman is impaled in the neck and shoulder by a branch that smashes through her car window. A man is attacked by a home intruder armed with a dagger in Standish, Maine.
22(50)	"Tennille/Chris/Joyce"	January 2, 2011
A woman living in Columbia, Maryland, is abducted and raped by a man that she upset at the bank that she worked at. A diver on a boat has an accident in the middle of the night on the California coast. A restaurant manager in Grantsville, Utah, gets in the middle of a deadly domestic argument.
23(51)	"Lori and Pat/David/Kevin"	January 9, 2011
A California couple faces life-threatening danger during a robbery in Mexico. In Warren, Michigan, a pastor is disembowelled during a home invasion but miraculously survives and forgives his attacker. A tornado survival story from Murfreesboro, Tennessee, is also told.
24(52)	"Kristine/Jon/Amanda"	January 16, 2011
A Simi Valley, California, woman is attacked by her mentally ill boyfriend, who stabs her in the chest and skull. A Hartford, Connecticut, man is trapped in his basement for three days with his arm caught in a boiler, and is forced to amputate it to free himself. A schoolteacher from Charlotte, North Carolina, is kidnapped and held hostage by a carjacker who refuses to go back to jail.
25(53)	"Danielle/Amy/Mark"	January 23, 2011
In Conway, South Carolina, a good deed backfires on a live theatre actress, who is abducted by a teen she agreed to drive home and shot in the head. A hiker is critically injured in a 60-ft. fall into a California ravine. A man is attacked on his docked Mexican fishing boat by an intruder with a knife who was in several mental hospitals.
26(54)	"Teka/Robert/Debbie"	January 30, 2011
In the third-season finale, a pregnant woman living in Suitland, Maryland, is abducted by another woman who wants to surgically remove her unborn baby from her body. A Nome, Alaska, geologist is attacked by a grizzly bear. In Merrillville, Indiana, a woman and her family are held hostage on Christmas morning and shot with a shotgun by her drunken ex-marine brother-in-law.

=== Season 4 ===
No.	Title	Original release date
1(55)	"Jennifer/Neely Ann"	May 15, 2011
A Palm Springs, California, nurse is kidnapped and sexually tortured by a serial killer. A mother and her daughter are trapped in an attic during a flood in Nashville, Tennessee.
2(56)	"Sharetha/Joe/John"	May 22, 2011
A pregnant woman living in Flint, Michigan, is abducted, assaulted, and has her throat cut. A man survives a plane crash and is stranded in an icy river. A man plays dead when his ex-co-worker, who wants revenge after being fired from his previous job, shows up at the Warren, Ohio, warehouse where he works and starts executing people.
3(57)	"Kara/Dan/Tamecka"	June 5, 2011
A man abducts and assaults a teen girl in West Columbia, South Carolina. A photographer is trapped during the Haitian earthquake under debris in a hotel. A Lancaster, Texas, woman is beaten and slashed with scissors by her neighbor.
4(58)	"Jason/Dave and Joe/Martin"	June 12, 2011
Three Utah men go over waterfalls during a flash flood and fight to stay alive. A teenage boy from Portsmouth, Virginia, is abducted and assaulted by a pedophile and then left to die chained in a box, buried under a thick layer of snow.
5(59)	"Julie/John"	June 19, 2011
A mother and her children are abducted from Palmetto Bay, Florida, and taken to the Everglades. A man survives a bear attack in Moses Lake, Washington.
* (60)	"9/11 Survivors"	September 6, 2011
The stories of 12 survivors from the September 11 attacks are recalled in a one-hour-and-a-half special.
6(61)	"Harold/John/Lisa"	October 23, 2011
A store manager in Saint Louis, Missouri, is shot during a robbery. A Minot, North Dakota, teen loses his arms in a farming accident. A girl from Tampa, Florida, is kidnapped by a serial killer.
7(62)	"Yvette/Jeremy and Jenny/Arkesha"	October 30, 2011
In Salt Lake City, Utah, an 18-year-old girl and her friend are shot late one night on their first date in the hills of the Little Dell Reservoir. Two people's lives cross in a split second when two Chatsworth, California-bound trains collide on the same track. A 13-year-old girl walking home from a school dance in New Orleans, Louisiana, is raped, separately, by 3 men.
8(63)	"Anita/Jim and Glen/Sabret"	November 6, 2011
A woman in Kokomo, Indiana, is kidnapped, raped, and forced to live, chained up, in a metal box, for 13 days. Two brothers are struck by lightning in a cabin at Yosemite National Park. A propane truck driver in Miami, Florida, displays extraordinary courage when she is viciously beaten by a stranger.
9(64)	"Amy/Jeff/Tyler"	November 13, 2011
A De Soto, Missouri, woman is raped and choked by a man she met at a party. A snowboarder is caught up in an avalanche. In Altona, Manitoba, two boys are attacked during a sleepover by a school bully who stabs them and sets the house on fire.
10(65)	"Michelle/Terri-Lynn/Jennifer"	November 20, 2011
A Fort Wayne, Indiana, woman is carjacked and raped. When a tornado sweeps through Huntsville, Alabama, a woman and her boyfriend become trapped in their collapsed apartment complex, not knowing they are the only survivors in the entire building. An 8-year-old girl is abducted from her Dickinson, Texas, condo and raped before her attacker slits her throat and leaves her to die in a sawgrass prairie.
11(66)	"Jessica/Jeff and Mark/Kerri"	January 15, 2012
A woman in West Palm Beach, Florida, is attacked by a man with a machete. Two friends are attacked by a bear in Alaska. A Wauwatosa, Wisconsin, teenager is attacked with an Arkansas toothpick while jogging but manages to stab her attacker before he flees.
12(67)	"Lisa/Chris/Jeannette"	January 22, 2012
A courageous story unfolds when a college student and her friend go out clubbing in Lake Havasu City, Arizona, but are abducted by a man who drives them out of town and sexually assaults them. He shoots Lisa after she escapes, leaving her to die in the desert winds. A man survives a tornado in Tuscaloosa, Alabama. A 9-year-old girl has to assume the patience of an adult when she is abducted, raped, and stabbed by a friend's father.
13(68)	"Kaye/Johnny/Scott"	January 29, 2012
A Laurel, Delaware, insurance agent is sexually assaulted and stabbed over 150 times in the chest, face, and neck but miraculously survives. A Mount Hood, Oregon, man crashes his car into a deep ravine. In Rockland County, New York, a man and his best friend are abducted at gunpoint and driven to a snowy construction site where the two are shot at point-blank range in the head.
14(69)	"Eduardo and Jayne"	February 12, 2012
A man is kidnapped for ransom in Mexico and tortured for several months while his fearful wife does everything she can to save him.
15(70)	"Kim & Nina/Michael & Charles"	February 19, 2012
Two women fight for their lives when a knife-wielding attacker ambushes them on a mountain trail. Two men on vacation survive 14 hours adrift at sea after their ship sinks in 15 to 20-foot waves (survivors of The Erik which sank in the Gulf of California).
16(71)	"Tanya/Andy/Denise"	April 1, 2012
A 13-year-old girl is abducted in McKeesport, Pennsylvania, and sexually tortured over 10 years. A Littleton, Colorado, man is attacked by a mountain lion. A woman is stalked by a man on the subway in Brooklyn, New York. She thought nothing of it until he follows her home one night.
17(72)	"Paul/Tressel/Melissa"	April 8, 2012
A Burnsville, Minnesota, man is stabbed, shot, and left to die in his burning home in a botched robbery. A man and his friends are stuck on a sunken fishing boat for days in Port Aransas, Texas. Snow falls in Memphis, Tennessee, as a woman is robbed, abducted at gunpoint, and locked in the trunk of her car as it begins to sink in a lake.
18(73)	"Angela/Pat/Tricia"	April 15, 2012
A young woman from suburban Chicago, Illinois, is kidnapped and raped. A farmer in Auburn, New York, loses his arm in a crop harvester. A young girl is stabbed in her Spring, Texas, home by a man she thought was her friend.
19(74)	"Jenn/Neil and Blake/Tiffany"	April 22, 2012
A Fairfield, Ohio, woman is attacked by her psychotic boyfriend who forces her to drink boiling water and whacks her with a meat cleaver. A father-son rafting trip turns into a nightmare when the boat capsizes and the two men must survive in the bitter cold conditions of the North Alaska wilderness. A college student in Tucson, Arizona, is attacked in her home by a serial killer who sexually assaults her and slashes her throat.
20(75)	"Donna/Michael/Sheila"	April 29, 2012
A Bakersfield, California, woman and her infant daughter are attacked. A man must stay afloat when his plane crashes over Lake Huron. A 17-year-old girl fights for her life when she is attacked in her Kettering, Ohio, home by her husband and his friend. After raping her and stabbing her in the throat and face several times, they toss her into a dumpster, leaving her to die.
21(76)	"Mijalina and Yvonne/Peter"	July 8, 2012
A Sacramento, California, man stabs his young daughter before unleashing his anger on their next-door neighbors in a drug-induced frenzy. After a man decides to move to Washington state, he purchases a fixer-upped in Freeland, Washington. However, his life becomes a nightmare when his contractor shows up at the house, beats him with a wooden board, and kidnaps him.
22(77)	"A Crime of Passion; Crystal/Johanna"	July 15, 2012
A Carlsbad, California, woman is raped by her husband after a rocky breakup. A 17-year-old girl from Euclid, Ohio, is shot in the face at point-blank range with a shotgun by her jealous ex-boyfriend.
23(78)	"Lenore/Steven/Ellen and Jim"	July 22, 2012
A woman is stabbed 31 times by a customer in the shop where she works. A doctor is kidnapped by an armed sociopath criminal. A couple are hijacked by pirates in their boat off the coast of Venezuela in the Caribbean.
24(79)	"Midsi/Tammy/Leona"	July 29, 2012
An 8-year-old girl is kidnapped while walking home from school and sexually abused over 2 horrifying days. A Clayton County, Georgia, woman is abducted in broad daylight, taken to a salt quarry, stabbed, raped, and left for dead. Two newlyweds who are enjoying their honeymoon in the Trinity Alps near Weaverville, California, are gunned down by a mentally insane man who believes that they have contaminated his distilled water. Leona managed to drive to a house and get to a hospital. Her husband's killer was found not guilty because of insanity.
25(80)	"Terri/Walter/James"	August 5, 2012
A Colorado Springs, Colorado, woman is taken hostage with her daughter and raped by her ex-husband. An Ashdown, Arkansas, man becomes trapped when an airplane crashes into him. A Bethlehem, Pennsylvania, man is attacked in his basement by a man with a golf club, who then burns him with chemicals.
26(81)	"Cynthia, Russ and Carol/Ron and Christine"	August 26, 2012
Students and teachers are taken hostage during the Cokeville Elementary School hostage crisis in Cokeville, Wyoming, when a husband and wife enter the school with guns and a bomb. A couple is attacked during their honeymoon in Jamaica.
27(82)	"Kirby and Suzanna/Raegan"	September 2, 2012
While eating lunch in Killeen, Texas, two strangers are caught up in the infamous Luby's shooting when a man crashes his car into the restaurant and opens fire. A mother of two is stalked by her ex-husband and beaten in the face with a crowbar in Rochester, New York.
28(83)	"Lynda/Kendra"	September 9, 2012
A Shingle Springs, California, woman displays extraordinary courage when she is attacked and raped by her former boyfriend, whom she met on an online dating website. A young mother from San Luis Obispo, California, is stabbed several times by her boyfriend, Shelley Malil.
29(84)	"Heather/Donna/Kim"	September 16, 2012
While driving on the highway in Gaston, Oregon, a woman is stabbed with a screwdriver by a man she offered to give directions to. A Waterbury, Connecticut, woman is sexually assaulted at gunpoint by a man who she and her husband knew well. A teenage girl working at a gas station in Winthrop, Missouri, is viciously attacked by a robber, who takes her to the beer fridge and saws through her jugular vein.
30(85)	"Laurie/Sandra/Melinda: Serial Killers"	September 30, 2012
In Windsor, Ontario, Canada, Sandra is attacked by Carl Eugene Watts, who slashes her face open. A Tweed, Ontario, Canada woman is beaten and sexually assaulted by serial killer, Russell Williams. When Carl Eugene Watts moves to Houston, Texas, he attempts to drown a woman and her roommate in the bathtub of their apartment.

=== Season 5 ===
No.	Title	Original release date
1(86)	"Shannon/Ken/Angela"	October 7, 2012
A Colorado Springs, Colorado, woman is shot in the back when she and her infant son are taken hostage by her ex-husband. A man is stranded on the remains of his sunken boat in the Gulf of Mexico. An Akron, Ohio, woman is sexually attacked at a public payphone and will stop at nothing to bring her attacker to justice.
2(87)	"Debbie/Ray/Jasmine"	October 14, 2012
A Williamsburg, Virginia, woman is attacked in her kitchen and raped in the woods outside her home. An Australian pilot and his friend fight for their lives in the Pacific Ocean after their plane crashed in the water. A small get-together with 3 friends in Indianapolis, Indiana, turns into a nightmare when a friend's jealous ex-husband kills everyone but her.
3(88)	"Gilles/Angela and Richard/Jeffrey"	October 21, 2012
An Edmonton, Alberta, Canada man is led into the lair of a serial killer. A husband and wife are attacked by a bear in their Pennsylvania home. A vampire movie comes to life when a Nanuet, New York, man awakes to find his neighbor ready to pound a sharpened crucifix into his chest.
4(89)	"Kim/John/Charlene"	October 28, 2012
A model in Memphis, Tennessee, is stabbed and raped by a close friend of hers. A man is kidnapped and held for ransom in Colombia. An Edgewood, Washington, woman's family movie night turns into a bloodbath when her home is broken into by 3 men with butcher knives.
5(90)	"A.J/Carolyn and Stacy/Lynne"	November 4, 2012
A heavily-armed teenager goes on a killing spree at a mall in Salt Lake City, Utah. A woman working on a cruise ship is scared for her life when the boat begins to sink on the south coast of Africa.
6(91)	"Natasha/Tim/Kellie"	November 11, 2012
A Manhattan, New York, woman is raped on the roof of her apartment building. A man working at a chemical plant in Jacksonville, Florida, is victim to a large explosion. A young woman in Orlando, Florida, is attacked by a man who rapes her, beats her with a tea kettle and slashes her throat to the bone.
7(92)	"Audrey/Todd/Kimberley"	November 25, 2012
A mother of two teenage boys in Apollo Beach, Florida, filed for divorce when she learned her husband was a compulsive liar. Outraged, her husband attacked her one day, beating her with a hammer, dousing her in gasoline, and setting her on fire. A man in Sun Valley, Idaho, survives for days in a freezing cold blizzard, after his car breaks down on a deserted road. A woman in San Francisco, California, jumps 8 feet out her apartment window to escape her attacker.
8(93)	"The Taliban: Jere"	December 5, 2012
A journalist is kidnapped and held captive in Pakistan.
9(94)	"Tricia and Linae/Jason/Mary"	December 9, 2012
After witnessing their mother and grandmother being shot dead, and their father critically injured in their Oakley, Utah, home, two young sisters are abducted by two men and driven off a cliff. A man and his friends are buried in a Montana avalanche while going snowmobiling. A Concord, Nebraska, woman is held hostage at her law office by a man who has stalked her for years.
10(95)	"The Norway Massacre: Sofie/Adrian/Magnus/Rebekka"	December 16, 2012
Two hours after detonating a massive car bomb in Oslo, Norway, killing 8 people, the bomber disguises himself as a policeman and makes his way to Utoya Island where 530 teenagers are attending a summer camp. During an 80-minute rampage, he stalks and shoots the defenseless teenagers. Sofie, Adrian, Rebekka, and Magnus survive the massacre, but 69 others die.
11(96)	"Louie and Wade/Sayeh"	December 30, 2012
Two Canadian forest workers are attacked by a bear. In Pensacola, Florida, an 8-year-old girl and her little sister are abducted by their mother's pedophile ex-boyfriend. He drives them into the woods where, after repeatedly raping the older girl, slits both girls' throats, leaving them to die.
12(97)	"John/Kevin/Helena"	March 3, 2013
A Kirkwood, Missouri, man is shot by a friend. A man is subjected to a vicious storm that lashes against his fishing boat in the Atlantic Ocean. A 17-year-old girl is raped at gunpoint in Santa Monica, California.
13(98)	"Brent/Hanna and Miranda/Karen"	March 10, 2013
An Atlanta, Georgia, stockbroker is attacked by a man who used to trade at his facilities who had already started a shooting spree. Two sisters and one friend must find shelter after their rowboat capsizes in Tustumena Lake in Alaska. Their father and one other friend had died from hypothermia before they could make it ashore. A Hackettstown, New Jersey, woman is kidnapped for ransom.
14(99)	"Hostage: Keith and Marc"	March 17, 2013
A routine drug surveillance mission over the Colombian jungle turns into a nightmare when Keith and Marc's plane crash-lands and they are captured by FARC guerillas and held hostage for five grueling years.
15(100)	"Amy/Trish and Darrell"	March 24, 2013
A New Haven, Connecticut, bartender is raped and beaten with a tree branch by a co-worker. A family seeks shelter as a tornado rips apart their Henryville, Indiana, home.
16(101)	"Angel/Elyse/Richard"	March 31, 2013
A woman is shot and run over by a car in Webster, Texas. A snowboarder survives an avalanche in Washington state. A Dallas lawyer is shot in the neck by a former client.
17(102)	"Morgan and Aaron/David/Amanda"	April 7, 2013
Two minor league baseball players are held hostage in a Kissimmee, Florida motel. An Alaskan fishing boat catches fire. A convenience store worker in Cedar Rapids, Iowa, is abducted, taken to an apartment, and raped.
18(103)	"Kristen/Kimball/Thadius"	April 14, 2013
A college student is abducted in Newark, Delaware, and sexually assaulted in a cellar. A man swims to shore after his boat sinks in Strawberry Reservoir, Utah. A 12-year-old boy from Baraboo, Wisconsin, is kidnapped and tortured by a neighbor who twists the boy's ankles until they snap.
19(104)	"Mike/Chris/Neza"	June 2, 2013
Survivors of Hurricane Sandy tell their stories.
20(105)	"Regan/Gary and Scott"	June 9, 2013
A 14-year-old girl and her friend are abducted by two men and taken to a house in the orange groves outside Vero Beach, Florida, where they are repeatedly sexually assaulted. Two men are horrifically burned in a plane crash in Alaska.
21(106)	"David/Sandy and Ken/Maura"	June 16, 2013
A 13-year-old boy from Orange County, California, is abducted and raped by a serial killer. A nanny is attacked by a Nile crocodile in the Ituri Forest in Africa. A Pacifica, California, woman is carjacked and stabbed 4 times.
22(107)	"Singer/Romina and John"	June 23, 2013
Four young Americans, kidnapped in Kyrgyzstan, face a difficult decision to either kill or be killed. A young couple's dream holiday at a Thai beach resort turns into a terror-filled fight for survival as a tsunami strikes.
23(108)	"Dorothy/Jim/Bud and Katrina"	June 30, 2013
A mother in Eustis, Florida, is abducted, raped, and shot 4 times and her two daughters are murdered. A man picking blueberries in Clayton, Georgia, is bitten by a timber rattlesnake. A gunman opens fire at a swimming hole in Niagara, Wisconsin, killing three people.
24(109)	"Bill, Mike and Ginger/Wanda"	July 7, 2013
3 people are shot at a televised school board meeting in Panama City Beach, Florida. A Birmingham, Alabama, woman is kidnapped and raped at gunpoint.
25(110)	"Rhonda/Jason/Patrick"	July 14, 2013
A Pensacola, Florida, woman is kidnapped, stabbed, and raped, but fakes amnesia to escape her attacker. A Henryville, Indiana, man clings to his mobile home when a tornado threatens to rip it from the ground. A man is brutally shot by his brother-in-law at his family Thanksgiving dinner in Jupiter, Florida.
26(111)	"Shaunna and Brad/Lee/Emily"	July 21, 2013
A woman and her boyfriend are shot by her ex-boyfriend before he sets their Los Angeles, California, home on fire. A man is trapped after he wrecks his car. A single mom from Grape Creek, Texas, is attacked and stabbed in the throat with a knife.

=== Season 6 ===
No.	Title	Original release date
1(112)	"Amanda/Erinn"	December 12, 2014
A woman is imprisoned on a remote rural property in Pottawatomie County, Oklahoma, by a man who sexually assaults her and murders her boyfriend; and a young mother living in Ridgecrest, California, is abducted at gunpoint, taken to the desert and subjected to hours of assault, beatings and mental torture.
2(113)	"Kristy/Jamison"	December 19, 2014
In Roaring Spring, Kentucky, a mother of three children is sexually assaulted, stabbed, and left to die in her burning home while her children are murdered; a Memphis, Tennessee, man is carjacked at gunpoint, taken to a remote field, shot and left for dead when his ATM card fails to work.
3(114)	"Kim/Erin and Claire"	January 26, 2015
A young woman is abducted by four armed men in Gladstone, Missouri, and held captive and sexually assaulted for 15 hours; two teenage sisters are attacked and raped in their Port Arthur, Texas, home, after their uncle is shot by a masked gunman.
4(115)	"Joan/Ida"	January 26, 2015
A Bethlehem, New York, woman is attacked in bed with a fireman's axe by an unknown man after he murders her husband; a cook is left to die in a burning room after she is shot twelve times at close range by an unknown assailant in Las Cruces, New Mexico.
5(116)	"Rosalie/Jane"	January 26, 2015
A Gilmer, Texas, woman is abducted from the prison where she works by a convicted murderer, and held captive at gunpoint for 26 hours on the run with him, sparking the largest search in Texas history; a heavily pregnant woman is stabbed 27 times at a gas station in West Swanzey, New Hampshire, by a man who accuses her of beating up his sister.
6(117)	"Roger/Julie"	January 26, 2015
A man is held hostage on a shuttle bus with several others by a man with a gun for over 8 hours in Atlantic City, New Jersey; a Bullhead City, Arizona, woman is sexually assaulted and shot after a botched home invasion leaves her friends and her husband dead.
7(118)	"Nate/Denna"	January 26, 2015
A 15-year-old boy from Bothell, Washington, is shot through the jaw and plays dead for three hours during a horrific school shooting; and an elderly woman, whose daughter deals drugs, winds up stabbed four times in her yard in Barnardsville, North Carolina, in a case of apparent mistaken identity.
