= Northwest Weather and Avalanche Center =

The Northwest Weather and Avalanche Center (NWAC) is a non-profit weather forecasting center located in Seattle, Washington, focusing primarily on weather conditions that can lead to avalanches in the Pacific Northwest. Its twice daily forecasts are important for recreational and professional users of mountains and other rural areas in the Pacific Northwest.

== Avalanche forecasting and reporting ==
The center focuses on forecasting for weather conditions that can lead to avalanches the Mount Hood region in Oregon, the northern Cascade Range in Washington, and the Olympic Mountains in Washington. The center also compiles and publishes accident reports when avalanches cause injury or death. Administered by the Mount Baker–Snoqualmie National Forest, the program consists of two avalanche meteorologists based in the Seattle National Weather Service Forecast office, and six avalanche specialists based in satellite offices across Washington and Oregon.

Former director NWAC director Mark Moore gained notoriety for his rhyming weather forecasts. He released his final such forecast shortly before retiring in December, 2012:

So my wish is simple when the season is done. That no one has died, not even one.

— Mark Moore

== Avalanche awareness ==
Director Moore summarized NWAC's mission as "we try to promote safe use of the mountains in the wintertime". As part of this mission, it issues warnings when there are conditions that increase the risk of avalanches. For example, NWAC had issued an avalanche advisory on the day of the 2012 Tunnel Creek avalanche, which all of the involved freeskiers had read and disregarded before starting down the mountain.
