= John Dwight Canaday =

American serial killer

John Canaday
- Canaday c. 1969
- Born: John Dwight Canaday; December 16, 1944; Washington, U.S.
- Died: December 26, 2012 (aged 68); Clallam Bay Prison, Clallam Bay, Washington, U.S.
- Conviction: First-degree murder (3 counts)
- Penalty: Death; commuted to life imprisonment

Details
- Victims: 3
- Span of crimes: 1968–1969
- Country: United States
- State: Washington
- Date apprehended: March 1969

John Dwight Canaday (December 16, 1944 – December 26, 2012) was an American serial killer who raped and killed three young women in Seattle, Washington, from 1968 to 1969. He was considered Washington's first known serial killer. At the time of his death, Canaday was serving three life sentences at Clallam Bay Prison.

== Early life ==
John Canaday was born December 16, 1944, in Washington state. He married Suzan Gray Higgins on September 17, 1964, in Idaho. At the time of their marriage, John was 19 and Suzan was 17. On March 3, 1969, Suzan was granted a divorce on grounds of cruelty. By the time of their divorce, they had two children together.

== Murders ==
In the early hours of December 17, 1968, 16-year-old Sandra Bowman, a pregnant newlywed, informed her husband Thomas that she had fallen ill, and was going to be bedridden for the rest of the day. Thomas returned home from his job at the American Can Company around 11:30 in the evening. He discovered Sandra dead, mostly nude, with her hands bound behind her back. She had been stabbed 60 times. A reward was put out for the killer, with Thomas Bowman initially cashing in some of his own money. Thomas was ruled out as a suspect based on part of an alibi, and eventually police exhausted all leads. Thomas and Bowman had been married for five months.

On January 4, 1969, 21-year-old Mary Annabelle Bjornson was preparing dinner for her boyfriend, Duane Thornton, at her apartment. She shared the apartment with a roommate named Suzette Gore. On the day she went missing, Mary's roommate was in Los Angeles. At around 9:00 PM, Thornton arrived at the apartment and found the food still cooking, with Bjornson nowhere to be found. She had taken her coat, but had left her cigarettes, purse, and identification. Thornton and a neighbor immediately called the police and reported her missing after searching for her. Bjornson was a University of Washington student. At the time of her disappearance, she was employed by the Sears store in Ballard, working to fund her schooling.

On January 24, 20-year-old Lynne Carol Tuski, a junior at the University of Washington, disappeared in Shoreline, Washington. She was last seen walking to her car around 7:15 PM after finishing her job at Sears on Aurora Ave. Her car was parked approximately 300 feet from the store's door. She was last seen by a coworker who was walking with her to the parking lot before going back into the store for something she forgot. When Tuski failed to arrive home, her father drove to the Sears parking lot to search for her. She had disappeared right before her 21st birthday, and had planned to have dinner with her parents to celebrate. After Tuski's disappearance, two women came forward and reported that they had been grabbed by an unknown man while walking to their cars in the same parking lot.

== Arrest and trial ==
By March 1969, Seattle police launched an investigation into Canaday, a Vietnam War veteran who had been accused of raping two women. Once in custody, he agreed to lead investigators to the bodies of Bjornson and Tuski. He had hidden them in a snow-covered patch off a forest access road off of Highway 2 in Index, Washington. Tuski was identified by her dental charts and her scars.

In Canaday's confession, he admitted that on January 4, the day Bjornson was last seen, he knocked on her apartment door claiming he was having car trouble. Once outside, he pulled out a knife and forced her into his vehicle and drove her to Seward Park, where he raped and strangled her to death. Canaday also admitted to abducting, raping, and killing Tuski the day she went missing, January 24.

Canaday was indicted on two counts of murder the following month, and pleaded not guilty by reason of insanity. In the end, a jury deliberated for only two hours to find Canaday guilty on all counts, on the basis of which days later he was sentenced to hang. His hanging was scheduled for May 15, 1972. Canaday won a reprieve after the Supreme Court of the United States' ruling on Furman v. Georgia. He was one of eight inmates that were on death row at the time. He was later resentenced to life imprisonment on both counts.

== Further identification and death ==
By 2002, the murder of Sandra Bowman had still yet to be solved. The Washington State Crime Lab agreed to examine the evidence from Bowman's murder and subsequent autopsy in hopes of finding new clues. Amy Jagmin, a forensic scientist, created a DNA profile from a sample of the perpetrator's semen. The profile was sent into a database of convicted felons, which matched with Canaday's DNA. Once confronted with the news, Canaday admitted that he had killed Bowman, receiving yet another life sentence in 2004.

At the time of Bowman's murder, Canaday was working as a pipeman's helper for the city water department. The identification was a record moment as, at the time, Bowman's murder was the oldest cold case solved in Washington. It also identified Canaday as Washington's first known serial killer. On December 26, 2012, Canaday was found unresponsive in his cell at Clallam Bay Prison. His death, according to the State's department of corrections, was from natural causes.

== See also ==
- List of serial killers in the United States
