= Angela Rose =

American activist (born 1978)

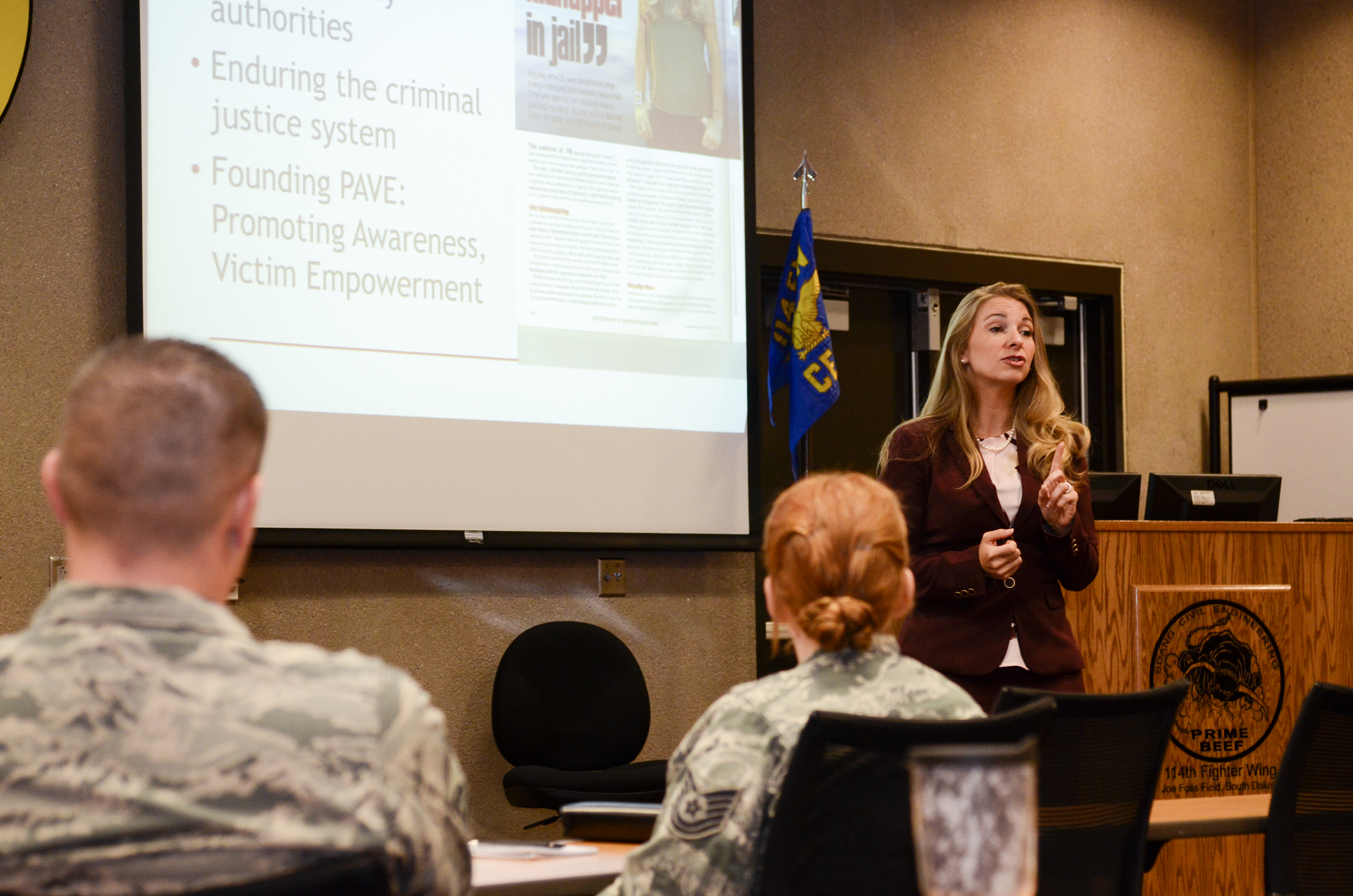
- Born: September 1, 1978 (age 47); Oak Park, Illinois, U.S.
- Education: Lake Park High School, Illinois (Class of 1996)
- Alma mater: University of Wisconsin–Madison (B.A., 2002)
- Occupation: Real estate agent

Angela Rose (born September 1, 1978) is an American activist known for helping other survivors heal from trauma. Her story of being kidnapped and sexually assaulted by Robert Koppa at age 17 in 1996 in Wauconda, Illinois has been widely publicized. She is a motivational speaker and the founder and executive director of the nonprofit PAVE: Promoting Awareness, Victim Empowerment. She is a frequent contributor to local and national media.

== Activism ==
=== Kidnapping and assault ===
Rose was kidnapped by Robert Koppa at knifepoint on July 13, 1996, from the Woodfield Mall in Schaumburg, Illinois, where she worked when she was seventeen years old. Rose was approached from behind and her assailant held a "sharp object" to her throat. She was driven to a forest preserve in Wauconda, Illinois, where she was sexually assaulted. After forcing her to change into a dress and sexually abusing her, he then allowed her to change back into her clothes. Koppa then drove her to a rear stairwell of One Schaumburg Place and left her. Rose then contacted mall security. Rose and her parents contacted the police after she was released. She later picked Koppa out of a police lineup, identifying him as her assailant. On July 18, 1996, the police charged Koppa with "aggravated kidnapping, aggravated criminal sexual abuse and armed violence." Koppa was also suspected as being the perpetrator of several other similar crimes. Koppa was on parole for murder when he kidnapped Rose. Koppa was convicted on "four counts of aggravated criminal sexual abuse, two counts of aggravated kidnapping and two counts of armed violence" in June 2000. While the trial had been ongoing, Rose, along with other victims, had been circulating a petition to "urge legislators to get tough on sex offenders." In 1998, the Illinois General Assembly passed the Sexually Violent Persons Commitment Act.

Rose has appeared on an episode of 48 Hours: Live To Tell called "I Remember Everything" (aired October 21, 2014, on CBS), The Montel Williams Show, I Survived..., The John Walsh Show, and newscasts across the country promoting her organization PAVE. Rose has presented workshops and given speeches at various conferences, military trainings, and on college campuses throughout the United States. In 2005, she was giving more than 100 speeches a year to high schools and college campuses.

=== PAVE: Promoting Awareness, Victim Empowerment ===
Rose founded PAVE: Promoting Awareness, Victim Empowerment in 2001 when she was still a senior at the University of Wisconsin. PAVE uses education and action to shatter the silence of sexual violence. PAVE's work has been illustrated on CNN and The Today Show. PAVE has created educational programming and tools as well as grassroots action campaigns. In 2002, PAVE produced a documentary called Transition to Survivor Parts 1 & 2 in which sexual assault survivors tell their stories. In the film, one woman talks about "blocking" her memories, becoming anorexic and self-harming. Another cries and talks of suicide. Eventually all the survivors went through counseling, friends, and family support. PAVE's Survivor Justice Campaign aims to bring awareness to perceived acts of misconduct towards victims of sexual assault throughout the criminal justice process. The organization, PAVE, inspired the creation of a chapter at the University of Wisconsin-Eau Claire and a men's sexual assault awareness group, Men Opposed to Sexual Assault (MOSA).

Rose has since been removed as Executive Director by the board of the organization and is no longer in leadership.

In 2005, Rose released a CD-ROM called "Sexual Violence: It Can Happen to You," in order to help educate people about sexual violence.

==== Binding Project ====
Through PAVE, Rose launched the Binding Project: Breaking Old Binds, Creating New Ties. The Binding Project is an international art empowerment campaign where participants write a word of empowerment on plastic zip ties, one to wear and one to send back to PAVE to be included in an installation art piece. This project was launched on the tenth anniversary of the day Rose was abducted. Zip ties were used to bind her hands behind her back when she was kidnapped.

=== Awards ===
- Moxie Award, Illinois Coalition Against Sexual Assault (ICASA), 2007
- Do the Right Thing Award, Ameriquest Mortgage, June 2006
- Undergraduate Excellence Award, University of Wisconsin–Madison, September 2001
- Louise Troxell Leadership Award, University of Wisconsin–Madison, May 2000
- Peacemaker of the Year Award, Wisconsin Network for Peace and Justice, April 2000

== Personal life ==
Rose graduated from the University of Wisconsin–Madison in 2002.
