= Clallam Bay Corrections Center =

Prison in Washington, United States

Clallam Bay Corrections Center (CBCC)
- Location in Washington
- Location: Clallam Bay, Washington; 48°14′24″N 124°17′16″W
- Status: Operational
- Security class: Medium, Close, Maximum
- Capacity: 858
- Opened: 1985
- Managed by: Washington State Department of Corrections
- Warden: Eddie Reetz, Superintendent
- Website: www.doc.wa.gov/corrections/incarceration/prisons/cbcc.htm

Clallam Bay Corrections Center is situated on the Olympic Peninsula in Clallam County, two miles (3.2 km) south of the community of Clallam Bay, Washington.

CBCC opened as a medium-custody 450-bed facility in 1985 and converted to a Close Custody facility in 1991. In 1992, it expanded to house an additional 400 medium-custody inmates. Today, the facility can house 900 inmates.

The facility provides medium-, maximum-, and close-custody housing for inmates who are serving sentences for crimes committed in Washington State. Currently, 68.4% of Clallam Bay's offenders were convicted of violent offenses, with an average age of 32.1 years old.

There are 400 full-time professional correctional employees at Clallam Bay. Five correctional industries staff members manage the on-site garment industry. Thirty members of the staff and faculty from Peninsula College serve at the facility, providing adult offender education and staff training programs.

== Notable inmates ==
Inmate Name	Register Number	Status	Details
Barry Loukaitis	771782	Serving 189 years	Perpetrator of the 1996 Frontier Middle School shooting in which he murdered two students and one teacher.

- George Russell - serial killer
- Paul Kenneth Keller - serial arsonist
- Timothy Forrest Bass - Mandy Stavik killer
- Kurtis Monschke - White supremacist murderer
- Alex Baranyi - one of the Bellevue murderers
- Nga Ngoeung - Spanaway murderer convicted in the 1994 murders of 17-year-olds Robert Forrest & Michael Welden
- Dominick Sergio Maldonado - Tacoma Mall shooter was previously held at Clallam Bay Corrections Center but in 2016 was transferred to ADX Florence after an unsuccessful escape attempt.
- John Dwight Canaday (1945 – December 26, 2012) was an American serial killer who raped and killed three young women in Seattle from 1968 to 1969

== See also ==
- List of law enforcement agencies in Washington (state)
- List of United States state correction agencies
- List of U.S. state prisons
- List of Washington state prisons
