= Tacoma Mall shooting =

Attempted mass murder in Tacoma, Washington

Coordinates: 47°12′57″N 122°28′07″W

- Location: Tacoma, Washington, U.S.
- Date: November 20, 2005; 20 years ago
- Target: Tacoma Mall
- Attack type: Attempted mass murder, mass shooting
- Weapons: Norinco MAK-90 semi-automatic rifle; Kimel AP-9 semi-automatic pistol
- Deaths: 0
- Injuries: 7 (6 by gunfire)
- Perpetrator: Dominick Sergio Maldonado

The Tacoma Mall shooting was a mass shooting and attempted mass murder that occurred on November 20, 2005, at the Tacoma Mall in Tacoma, Washington, United States. The gunman, Dominick Maldonado, entered the mall with a semi-automatic Norinco MAK-90 rifle and a pistol, injuring six before he instigated four armed kidnappings.

== Details ==
Dominick Maldonado entered the Tacoma shopping mall around 12:15pm, November 20, 2005, and quickly opened fire with a MAK-90 semi-automatic rifle. During the course of the shooting, Brendan (Dan) McKown, a mall employee, intervened. McKown drew his 9 mm CZ pistol but then had second thoughts of shooting "a kid". McKown (with his handgun still holstered) verbally commanded Maldonado to put down his gun. Maldonado's response was to fire on McKown, striking him once in the leg and four times in the torso, damaging McKown's spine and leaving him paralyzed. In addition to McKown, five other people were shot but not seriously injured, and a seventh person received a non-gunshot injury. At least one other person in the mall at the time also pulled a gun on Maldonado, but did not fire for fear of hitting innocent bystanders. No one was killed during the shooting.

Maldonado then took four people hostage in a Sam Goody store, including two employees, a customer, and a 12-year-old boy whom he only briefly held captive before releasing. The hostage situation lasted until 4 p.m. when Maldonado surrendered to a Tacoma police SWAT team without further incident.

Hostages taken during the incident chronicled their story on Biography Channel's I Survived....

== Perpetrator ==
Dominick Sergio Maldonado (born September 22, 1985) was identified as the perpetrator in the shootings and had an extensive juvenile criminal record including burglary, theft, and possession of burglary tools. He had also been given a court order not to possess any weapons. At the time of the shooting, Maldonado had recently separated from his girlfriend, and had been using methamphetamine without sleep for almost a week.

=== Trial and imprisonment ===
Maldonado was charged with eight counts of first-degree assault, four counts of first-degree kidnapping, and two counts of unlawful possession of a firearm, pleading not guilty to the charges. He has been represented by five different lawyers and three defense teams.

Maldonado was convicted on October 2, 2007, and sentenced to 163 years in prison on November 2. He unsuccessfully attempted to escape from the Clallam Bay Corrections Center on June 29, 2011. During the escape attempt, Maldonado took a corrections officer hostage using a pair of scissors. Kevin Newland, a second inmate who had been serving a 45 year sentence for murdering Jamie Lynn Drake in 2006, was shot once and killed by a guard after driving a forklift through a set of doors and crashing it into a perimeter fence. The guard who Maldonado held hostage was sent to the hospital for minor injuries. Maldonado was married in prison in the spring of 2007.

Citing "safety/security concerns", the Washington State Department of Corrections transferred Maldonado to ADX Florence in Colorado on May 11, 2016. He was briefly transferred out of ADX Florence but returned in May 2023, and remains incarcerated there.

== See also ==
- Westroads Mall shooting
- Trolley Square shooting
- Sello mall shooting
