= Randall Lee Smith =

American murderer (1953–2008)

- Born: June 29, 1953; Pearisburg, Virginia, U.S.
- Died: May 10, 2008 (aged 54); Dublin, Virginia, U.S.
- Other name: A.T. Killer (Note: A.T. stands for Appalachian Trail)
- Status: Deceased
- Conviction: Second degree murder (2 counts)
- Penalty: 30 years imprisonment

Details
- Date: May 6, 2008; 18 years ago
- Span of crimes: 1981–2008
- Location: Appalachian Trail
- Killed: 2
- Injured: 2
- Weapon: .22 Short Pistol

Randall Lee Smith (June 29, 1953 – May 10, 2008) was an American convicted murderer from Pearisburg, Virginia. He pleaded guilty shortly before trial commenced to two counts of second-degree murder in the deaths of hikers Robert Mountford Jr. and Laura Susan Ramsay, both 27-year-old social workers from Maine who were murdered by Smith while hiking the Appalachian Trail in May 1981. He was sentenced to two concurrent 15 year terms, in a plea bargain, and released in 1996 on mandatory parole after serving 15 years.

Smith's sentence and his early release were both met with anger by the victims' families as well as the hiking community. Hikers protested outside the courtroom the day after his sentencing, and a spokesman for the Appalachian Trail Conference said Smith is the "first person convicted of murdering a hiker who has had the opportunity to leave prison". His probation ended in 2006.

On May 6, 2008, Smith attempted to kill Scott Johnston, 38, and Sean Farmer, 33, on a fishing trip near Dismal Creek, less than two miles from the site of the 1981 murders. He was befriended by the two men, who shared their dinner with Smith, before he opened fire on them without warning, shooting Farmer in the head and chest and Johnston in the neck and back; both would survive their wounds. Smith was arrested that day after attempting to escape in Johnston's truck and subsequently crashing. He died in jail four days later as a result of injuries sustained in the crash.

The novel Murder on the Appalachian Trail (1985), by Jess Carr, is a fictionalized account of the 1981 murders.

The 1981 murders and 2008 attacks were depicted in the Investigation Discovery series Dead Silent: The Curse of Dismal Creek, season 1, episode 1, broadcast on October 25, 2016. Smith was also referenced in season 12, episode 4 of Criminal Minds. The 2008 attack was also featured on season 2, episode 17 of I Survived...
