= Mary Vincent (artist) =

American artist and victims' advocate (born 1963)

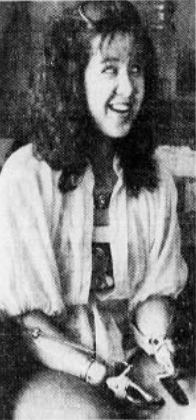
Mary Vincent, pictured wearing prosthetic limbs in 1979

Mary Bell McGriff (née Vincent; born 1963) is an American artist and victim advocate. She became known to the public after surviving a violent attack while hitchhiking in 1978, in which her forearms were severed with a hatchet. McGriff has focused her adult life on her art, and she generally avoids the public spotlight.

== Early life ==
Vincent is one of seven children and lived with her parents in Las Vegas. She is half-Filipino. Her father worked as a mechanic and married her mother, a blackjack dealer, while serving in the military. Vincent's parents were going through a messy divorce, which caused her to run away from their home in Las Vegas. In September 1978, after a brief period living on the streets and inside unlocked cars, Vincent hitchhiked to her grandfather's home in Berkeley, California.

=== Attack ===
During the journey to her grandfather's house, she accepted a ride from Lawrence Singleton. When Singleton began driving in the wrong direction, Vincent grew suspicious and attempted to flee, but Singleton knocked her unconscious with a sledgehammer. After she regained consciousness, Singleton tied her up, raped her, and amputated both arms at the forearm with a hatchet. He then threw her down a cliff and drove off, leaving her for dead. Vincent survived the fall and climbed back up the cliff despite her injuries. She dipped the stumps of her forearms in mud and held them up to reduce the bleeding, then attempted to flag down drivers for help. After trudging along Interstate 5 for over three miles, she attracted the attention of a couple who helped her get medical attention.

=== Aftermath and recovery ===
In the hospital, Vincent immediately worked with police to help identify and find her attacker, insisting on postponing sleep to finish creating a composite sketch for investigators. She also testified in Singleton's trial, leading to his conviction. Vincent won a civil judgment against Singleton and was awarded $2.56 million, but did not receive the payment due to his unemployment and inability to pay. Also, according to Vincent, when she walked by Singleton in the courtroom, he surreptitiously told her he would "finish her off" when he was released from prison.

Singleton was released from prison in 1987 after serving eight years of his fourteen-year sentence, despite massive public protests against his release. During this time, Vincent, harrowed by Singleton's threat, had enlisted a friend to be her bodyguard. Singleton moved back to Florida, where in February 1997, he murdered a mother of three in Sulphur Springs. Vincent testified against Singleton during his subsequent murder trial in February 1998, and he was sentenced to death. Singleton died in December 2001 from cancer while on death row.

== Adult life ==
Vincent began using prosthetic arms within two weeks of the attack. As someone who likes to "tinker", Vincent has used spare parts from broken-down electronics to modify her prosthetics into custom designs. Among the changes in her life after the attack, she began a career in art. Vincent attended the University of Nevada, Las Vegas as an adult. She married and subsequently divorced a man named Tom and has two sons. She currently lives in Vaughn, Washington, with her husband Tony McGriff.

=== Advocacy ===
After her attacker was released from prison and attacked and murdered a woman, Vincent volunteered to testify against him again at his trial. She has spoken openly about finding healing by becoming a victims' advocate in support of victims' rights and delivering motivational speeches.

=== Art ===
Vincent works with chalk pastels to create "powerfully upbeat women" like "female action figures". She also draws family and individual portraits on commission. Her customized prosthetics are also self-creations, including a custom prosthetic for bowling.

== In media ==
=== Podcasts ===
- Morbid podcast, Episode 27: The Survival Story of Mary Vincent, Patron Saint of Badassery
- Beyond the Ferns podcast, Episode 36: The Survival Story of Mary Vincent
- Sinners Among Saints podcast, Episode 170: The Amazing Survival of Mary Vincent
- Sisters of the Strange podcast, Episode 13: The Attack on Mary Vincent
- Crime Report with Christina Randall podcast: The Sweet Grandpa Lie: The Terrifying Truth Mary Vincent Never Saw Coming
- My Favorite Murder podcast, Episode 18: Investigateighteen Discovery
