= Murder of Elizabeth Reiser =

2000 murder in Ohio, United States

- Location: Near New Philadelphia, Ohio, U.S.
- Date: May 24, 2000; 26 years ago
- Attack type: Murder by stabbing
- Victim: Elizabeth Reiser
- Perpetrator: Matthew Vaca
- Verdict: Guilty
- Sentence: 96½ years in prison

On May 24, 2000, 17-year-old Elizabeth "Liz" Reiser was murdered near the Tuscarawas River in Ohio, United States. Matthew Vaca, aged 27, was arrested the following day in connection with her death and was subsequently convicted. The case also gained attention due to the survival and escape of Reiser's friend, Brandi Hicks.

== Incident ==
Around 8:30 pm on May 24, 2000, Elizabeth Reiser and her friend Brandi Hicks were approached by Matthew Vaca as they were leaving a Hollywood Video store in the New Towne Mall. Vaca asked them for a ride, and although hesitant, they agreed. During the drive, Vaca's behavior raised suspicion, and the two friends asked him to leave the car. However, Vaca brandished a gun, threatening them, and ordered them to continue driving. He directed them to a remote field on the outskirts of town, where he tied Hicks to the car with a shoelace and led Reiser into the field.

Vaca then slashed Reiser's throat and repeatedly stabbed her in the neck, leaving her to bleed to death. He returned to the car and untied Hicks. Vaca raped Hicks multiple times and attempted to kill her by breaking her neck. Hicks pretended to be dead as Vaca attempted to dispose of her body by throwing her into the Tuscarawas River. Hicks was discovered by passersby the next morning, May 25, and received treatment at Union Hospital.

== Arrest and trial ==
On the night of May 25, the local sheriff's office was alerted to the crime when Shelia Davis, Vaca's mother, reported that her son had committed a serious offense. Vaca's brother-in-law, Jeff Mullinix, later informed authorities that Vaca had shown him the crime scene and the victim's body, confessing to the murder. Vaca, who was on probation for theft and forgery at the time, was arrested shortly after. He was charged with 11 counts, including murder, and was sentenced to 96½ years in prison.
