= Elyse Saugstad =

American skier

Elyse Saugstad is an American professional free skier. She was the 2008 Freeride World Champion. Saugstad gained additional prominence after surviving the 2012 Tunnel Creek avalanche. She credits her survival to her use of an avalanche airbag that she deployed when the slide started.
