= Carl Eugene Watts =

American serial killer (1953–2007)

- Watts in 2004
- Born: November 7, 1953; Killeen, Texas, U.S.
- Died: September 21, 2007 (aged 53); Jackson, Michigan, U.S.
- Other names: The Sunday Morning Slasher; Coral
- Spouse: Valeria Goodwill (1979–1980)
- Children: 1
- Convictions: Texas; Aggravated burglary Michigan; First degree murder (2 counts)
- Penalty: Texas; 60 years imprisonment Michigan; Life imprisonment (no parole)

Details
- Victims: 15–100+
- Span of crimes: 1974–1982
- Country: United States
- States: Michigan; Texas
- Date apprehended: May 23, 1982

Carl Eugene Watts (November 7, 1953 – September 21, 2007), dubbed the Sunday Morning Slasher, was an American serial killer who murdered numerous women and girls between 1974 and 1982. Watts is suspected of being the most prolific serial killer in United States history. He died of prostate cancer while serving two sentences of life imprisonment without parole in a Michigan prison for the murders of Helen Dutcher and Gloria Steele.

Watts officially confessed to the murders of thirteen women but later claimed he had killed forty women and also implied that there were more than eighty victims in total. He would not confess outright to having committed these murders, however, because he did not want to be seen as a "mass murderer." Police consider Watts a suspect in ninety unsolved murders, and he is now suspected to have killed more than one hundred.

== Early life and criminal history ==
Carl Eugene Watts was born on November 7, 1953, to Richard Eugene Watts and Dorothy Mae Young, both natives of Coalwood, West Virginia. Watts' father was a private first class in the United States Army, and his mother was a kindergarten art teacher. In 1942, before Watts was born, his father was transferred to Fort Hood in Killeen, Texas, the location of the Army's tank destroyer training center. Three days after Watts' birth in Killeen, the family returned to West Virginia. The couple's second child, a daughter named Sharon, was born a year later.

Watts' parents divorced when he was less than two years old, and his mother raised him as a single parent. In 1962, Watts' mother married a mechanic named Norman Caesar, with whom she had two daughters. The family moved to Inkster, Michigan, where she found employment as a high school art teacher. Watts disliked his new stepfather, however, which made it difficult for him to adapt to his new familial environment. Watts later claimed that he often worried about losing his mother's attention.

Watts, his sister and his mother frequently visited his maternal grandmother in Coalwood. In the rural region near his grandmother's home, Watts learned to hunt and skin rabbits with his grandfather, an activity he enjoyed. Watts later adopted the nickname "Coral," which was the southern pronunciation of his name, as a result of his passion for the Coalwood and the relatives who lived there. Watts reportedly had academic difficulties in Michigan but yet managed to earn decent grades.

When he was eight years old, Watts and his sister contracted meningitis, which nearly killed him. He was brought to the Herman Kiefer Hospital in Detroit for treatment and was kept apart from other patients and underwent spinal taps. Journalists claim that Watts' body temperature was so high that physicians worried it might have caused brain damage. Family members noticed a change in his personality following his illness, describing him as bashful, quiet and introverted. Watts' performance at school worsened, resulting in him being held back one grade. Watts also started having violent dreams about battling off and killing the wicked spirits of women, which interrupted his sleep cycle. When detectives later asked why he killed women, Watts responded that he wanted to "free their spirits" because they had "evil eyes."

By age 12, Watts began to relish his dreams of torturing and killing girls and young women. He began stalking girls as a teenager, and it is thought that he killed his first victim before the age of 15. On June 29, 1969, while delivering newspapers on his route, Watts knocked on the apartment door of 26-year-old Joan Gave. Watts savagely assaulted Gave when she answered the door, then continued on his route as if nothing had happened. Gave immediately contacted the authorities, who apprehended Watts at his home. He was ordered to undergo psychiatric treatment at the Lafayette Clinic in Detroit.

During a psychiatric evaluation, when asked if his dreams disturbed him, Watts replied, "No, I feel better after I have one," and claimed that they were not nightmares because "he enjoyed them." He further elaborated that his motivation for assaulting Gave was because he "just felt like beating someone up." According to a psychiatric assessment, Watts was revealed to have a mild intellectual disability with an intelligence quotient of 75, and to have a delusional thought process and no evidence of psychosis. However, a police officer interrogating Watts after his arrest later stated that he appeared to be "very, very intelligent" with an "excellent memory." Watts' psychiatrist later reported that he was an "impulsive individual who has a passive-aggressive orientation to life" and who is "struggling for control of strong homicidal impulses." He thought Watts posed a threat to society and hoped that the adolescent would benefit from outpatient therapy. Watts was discharged from the Lafayette Clinic on his 16th birthday and visited the facility nine more times for outpatient care throughout the ensuing years. During his time in various mental institutions, he was diagnosed with antisocial personality disorder.

Watts graduated from high school in 1973 at the age of 19 and was given a football scholarship to Lane College in Jackson, Tennessee, despite his subpar grades and sporadic drug use after his release. Watts said that exercising allowed him to let out his suppressed rage. He was able to achieve stardom as a football player and even greater success in boxing, becoming a Golden Gloves fighter. After just three months, he was expelled from Lane College after being charged with stalking and assaulting women and receiving minor leg injuries. The fact that many people at Lane College thought Watts was a suspect in the violent killing of a female student—even though there was insufficient evidence to hold him accountable for the crime—was another factor in his dismissal. Watts briefly resided in Houston, Texas, following his expulsion, and then spent a year working as a mechanic for a Detroit wheel manufacturer. In 1974, when Watts enrolled in Western Michigan University in Kalamazoo, a string of heinous assaults and attacks on women started to occur.

== Murders ==
Watts' first confirmed murders took place in 1974, by kidnapping his victims from their homes and then murdering them. He attacked in several different jurisdictions and even different states. Most of his victims were thin, attractive white women, and he used methods such as strangulation, stabbing, bludgeoning and drowning. His victims ranged between the ages of 14 and 44. Watts murdered dozens of women between 1974 and 1982, and despite the scale of his killings, he was not discovered for almost eight years. Even with the advent of DNA testing, it was still nearly impossible to connect them because he rarely performed sexual acts on his victims; his crimes were not thought to be sexually motivated.

On September 6, 1972, the body of Zenaida Tomes, aged 20, was discovered in a field in Taylor, Michigan, adjacent to North Line Road and Lange Close. She had suffered forty-five stab wounds. Over the years, rumors have circulated that Tomes' death may have been caused by Watts, who was present in the area at the time. However, Tomes was taken from Detroit and murdered somewhere else, which is contradictory with Watts' known modus operandi. Watts may also have been involved in the disappearance of 16-year-old Nadine Jean O'Dell, who disappeared on August 16, 1974. O'Dell was last seen walking down John Daly Street in Inkster, on her way to babysit at her boyfriend's house. Her body has never been found, and no one witnessed her presumed abduction.

At 10:45 a.m. on October 25, 1974, Watts knocked on the apartment door of 23-year-old Lenore Knizacky. He called for "Charles," which was the name of one of his siblings, when she unlocked the door while the door was still chained. When she responded in the negative, she asked if he would like to leave a note, and she undid the chain lock and went to get paper. Watts then attacked Knizacky and choked her into unconsciousness. Police were later alerted by Knizacky, but were unable to find her attacker.

Gloria Steele, a 20-year-old student at Western Michigan University (WMU), was tortured and killed by Watts on October 30, 1974, having suffered a crushed windpipe and thirty-three stab wounds to the chest. There were no witnesses other than Diane Williams, an apartment manager, who saw a black man "searching for Charles" strolling throughout the complex. When Watts saw Williams, he grabbed her, pushed her door open and dragged her inside her own apartment. Williams' phone started to ring as the two were fighting, so she knocked it off the hook and yelled for help. She spotted the attacker getting into a tan Pontiac Grand Prix after he fled. Police assembled a line-up, and Williams and Knizacky recognised Watts, who had just been apprehended stealing plywood from the WMU campus. For both the Knizacky and Williams cases, Watts was taken into custody and charged with assault and battery.

After being diagnosed with antisocial personality disorder, and attempting suicide with a length of cord at the Kalamazoo Psychiatric Hospital, Watts was moved to the Center for Forensic Psychiatry in Michigan. When he was questioned about the Steele killing in 1975, he acknowledged that he had been nearby the day before the murder, but insisted that he had not killed Steele despite having admitted to attacking around fifteen other young women. When Detroit police executed a search warrant for Watts' residence, they discovered wooden carving tools but no evidence connecting him to Steele. Watts entered a "no contest" plea at his trial for the assault and battery of Knizacky and Williams and was sentenced to a year in county jail. Watts' psychologists classified him as being extremely hazardous, lacking in remorse for his crimes, impetuous, careless and emotionally distant, with a high likelihood of recidivism.

Watts returned to Inkster after being released from prison in 1976 and moved in with his mother and stepfather. In 1979 he impregnated Deloris Howard, a childhood friend, resulting in the birth of Nakisha Watts. Watts and Howard soon split, and he wed Valeria Goodwill not long after. Goodwill claimed that shortly after their wedding, Watts started behaving oddly. Watts kept moving the furniture around, using knives to chop up houseplants, broke candles and melted them into the table and dumped trash all over the floors without picking it up. He would also get up and depart after they had sex or had an "intimate encounter," and would disappear for several hours at a time. Their union only lasted six months.

Five women were attacked and killed in the Detroit region over the course of a year by a perpetrator who was dubbed by Ann Arbor newspapers as the "Sunday Morning Slasher," since all of the attacks took place on Sunday mornings at around 4 a.m. On October 31, 1979, Jeanne Clyne, a 44-year-old reporter for Detroit News, walked home after a doctor's appointment and was attacked. She was approached in broad daylight next to her Grosse Point Farms home and stabbed eleven times, resulting in her death. Insufficient evidence was discovered by police to identify a suspect. Detectives initially suspected Clyne's husband, but once Watts admitted to her murder, they ruled him out.

Shirley Small, a 17-year-old high school student from Ann Arbor, was fatally stabbed twice in the heart outside her home on April 20, 1980. Glenda Richmond, aged 26, was the victim of a comparable assault on July 13, 1980, in front of her summer residence in the Ann Arbor region. A diner manager, Richmond sustained twenty-eight knife wounds to her chest. At both crime scenes, insufficient evidence was yielded. However, both murders displayed characteristics of Watts' crimes. University of Michigan graduate student Rebecca Huff, aged 30, was found dead in front of her house on September 14, 1980. Huff had suffered about fifty stab wounds. Her case was the first homicide that could be directly attributed to Watts.

On July 31, 1980, 28-year-old Lilli Marlene Dunn was last seen at around 3 a.m. on Agnes Street in Southgate. She had left her house at 6:30 p.m. to go bowling, after which she proceeded to a bar on Ford Road in Dearborn. When Dunn returned home at around 2:30 in the morning, an assailant attacked her after she had parked her car in her garage. She was thrown into a light-coloured vehicle kicking and screaming. Authorities believe Dunn could have been a victim of Watts. It is also believed that Watts was behind the 1979 murder of Malak “Mimi” Haddad, aged 34, whose headless body was found in Allen Park. Her case is still open, and her head has never been found.

Canadian authorities believe Watts then crossed the border into Windsor, Ontario, assaulting 20-year-old Sandra Dalpe outside her apartment on October 6, 1980, and leaving her near death with multiple wounds to the face and throat. She ended up with partially paralyzed muscles, could hardly eat or move her head and her arms barely moved over her head due to deep slashes sustained to her face, one of which ruptured her jugular vein. On November 1, "Angus," a 30-year-old woman, spotted a black man wearing a hooded sweatshirt as she was making her way home from a Halloween party. He bent down to tie his shoe as soon as she pulled out her keys and then immediately followed her. Angus ran to her front door while screaming at the top of her lungs. The attacker was startled by her response, so he turned and fled the other way. Angus identified Watts from a line-up of photos, but she was not sure because the outside area was dimly lighted at the time of her attack.

By that time, Watts had fallen under scrutiny from Michigan homicide investigators. A task force was organized in July 1980 to probe the Sunday slashings, and Watts was placed under sporadic surveillance; a November court order permitted officers to plant a homing device in his car.

On November 15, in the early morning, two police officers on patrol in the vicinity of Main Street in Ann Arbor saw a suspicious man in a car following a woman who was walking home. She attempted to hide in a doorway after realising she was being followed in the hopes that her stalker would lose her. Watts was detained by police after they pulled him over for having outdated license plates and a suspended license. Upon examining his car, police discovered a package containing wood-filing equipment and a few screwdrivers. Their most important discovery, however, was a dictionary belonging to Huff which had the phrase "Rebecca is a lover" carved into the cover. It was insufficient proof, though, to hold him responsible for her murder. Watts relocated to Columbus, Texas, in the spring of 1981, where he worked for an oil firm. He spent his weekend nights travelling more than seventy miles to his next hunting ground in the Houston region.

== Arrest and discovery ==
Houston General Post Office (G.P.O.): Several women at the G.P.O. were assaulted by Carl Eugene Watts. Carl bumped into June Reynolds car with his car. She was pregnant at the time. Two other women, Lucia DeStefano and Karen Koslicky, also had a man bothering them on the freeway when they drove home from work. Cheryl Sibolo was assaulted by Carl Eugene Watts on the night of April 14, 1982. She spotted him in her rear-view mirror while exiting the Federal parking lot, and she pulled over immediately in front of the G.P.O. to confront him. She exited her car, yelling very loud and flailing her arms at him with threats to leave her alone or else. He tried to exit his vehicle but Cheryl kept threatening him. He was very scared and got back in his car and so did Cheryl. He drove around her vehicle with a scared look on his face, but it appeared to be a mock look and he drove down Franklin Street. Carrie Mae Jefferson was assaulted on April 16, 1982, when Watts accosted outside her home as she was returning from work at the downtown post office. Watts choked Jefferson into semiconsciousness, threw her into the trunk of her car and drove her to White Oak Bayou as she frantically tried to escape from the vehicle. There he killed her and buried her body, then returned her car to the street where she lived.

Watts was finally arrested by Houston police on May 23, 1982, and charged with the kidnapping and attempted murder of Lori Lister, and aggravated kidnapping of Lister's friend, Melinda Aguilar, in the course of a burglary at Lister's residence. Later on Sunday, the body of Michele Maday, 20, was found after she had been assaulted, beaten, and choked in her Houston apartment. Maday's assailant entered her bathroom, filled the tub with water, and drowned her before departing. After the killing of Maday, Watts entered the Houston residence of Lori Lister, 21, and Melinda Aguilar, 18. He choked Lister on the steps below the apartment when she returned from work. Then he went inside the apartment and choked Aguilar too. She pretended to be unconscious while Watts tied her hands behind her back with wire. In order to drown Lister, he hauled her body upstairs and into the bathroom, where he filled the bathtub with water. Aguilar was able to escape while Watts was focused on Lister and leapt out of a window to get assistance. Lister was saved, and Watts was apprehended while trying to evade capture. While Watts was being held, investigators started to connect him to several recent killings of women. However, prosecutors in Texas did not believe they had enough evidence to find Watts guilty of murder.

In May 1982, after the attacks on Aguilar and Lister, Harris County Assistant District Attorney Ira Jones brokered a plea bargain. Watts would only be charged with burglary with intent to murder if he confessed fully to his crimes and received immunity from prosecution on the murder accusations. A 60-year sentence was imposed for this offence. The deal was accepted, and he later led the detectives to the graves of three of his victims. Watts finally acknowledged attacking 19 women, murdering 13 of them. Watts admitted to killing 44-year-old Jeanne Clyne in Detroit in 1979, but he refrained from confessing to the deaths of Richard, Small, or Huff. However, Michigan authorities refused to go in on the deal so the cases in that state remained open.

Linda Tilley, 22, a student at the University of Texas, was drowned in the swimming pool of her apartment complex in September 1981, according to his confession. One week later, he also killed Elizabeth Montgomery, 25, by stabbing her. Susan Wolf, 21, was several steps from her apartment when she was fatally stabbed in the arm and chest while going home after purchasing ice cream from a grocery store. Watts acknowledged another murder from January 1982—that of 27-year-old Phyllis Tamm, who was attacked while jogging. Watts alleged that after choking her with his hands, he tied an elastic strap to a tree branch and hung her there.

Margret Fossi, 25, was murdered by Watts almost two days later. At Rice University, her body was discovered in the trunk of her vehicle. Additionally, Watts said to authorities that on January 16 he later saw Julia Sanchez, a young woman, attempting to fix a flat tire on a motorway. Sanchez was left for dead after Watts sliced her throat. Despite this, she lived. Watts claimed to have assaulted two additional women in the Houston region that same month. Patty Johnson, then 19, was attacked on January 30, 1982, as she exited her car on her way home. Watts slashed her throat in an attempt to kill her. Johnson survived, and up until Watts admitted guilt, another man had received a life sentence for the assault. The second victim Watts cited was "Martell," a 19-year-old who had been attacked outside of her residence and stabbed three times with a screwdriver but had managed to survive.

Watts also admitted to killing Elena Semander, 20, Emily LaQua, 14, Anna Ledet, 34, Yolanda Garcia, 21, Carrie Jefferson, 32, Suzanne Searles, 25, and Michele Maday, 20, between February and May 1982. Watts was never put on trial for the majority of the murders despite his confessions due to the agreement he made.

== Michigan trial and death ==
Watts was sentenced to the agreed 60 years in 1982. However, shortly after he began serving time, the Texas Court of Appeals ruled that he had not been informed that the bathtub and water he attempted to drown Lori Lister in was considered a deadly weapon. The ruling reclassified him as a non-violent felon, making him eligible for early release. At the time, Texas law allowed nonviolent felons to have three days deducted from their sentences for every one day served as long as they were well behaved. Watts was a model prisoner, and had enough time deducted from his sentence that he could have been released as early as May 9, 2006. The law allowing early release was abolished after public outcry but could not be applied retroactively according to the Texas Constitution.

In 2004, Michigan Attorney General Mike Cox went on national television asking for anyone to come forward with information in order to try to convict Watts of murder to ensure he was not released. Joseph Foy of Westland, Michigan, came forward to say that he had seen a man fitting Watts' description murder Helen Dutcher, a 36-year-old woman who died after being stabbed 12 times on December 1, 1979. Foy identified Watts by his eyes, which he described as being "evil" and devoid of emotion. Although Watts had immunity from prosecution for the 13 killings he had admitted to in Texas, he had no immunity agreement in Michigan. Before his 2004 trial, law enforcement officials asked the trial judge to allow the Texas confessions into evidence, to which he agreed.

Watts was promptly charged with the murder of Helen Dutcher. A Michigan jury convicted him on November 17, 2004, after hearing eyewitness testimony from Joseph Foy. On December 7, he was sentenced to life imprisonment. Two days later, authorities in Michigan started making moves to try him for the murder of Western Michigan University student Gloria Steele, who was stabbed to death in 1974. Watts' trial for the Steele murder began in Kalamazoo, Michigan on July 25, 2007; closing arguments concluded July 26. The following day the jury returned a guilty verdict. Watts was sentenced to life imprisonment without parole on September 13. He was incarcerated at the Ionia Correctional Facility in Ionia, Michigan. He died of prostate cancer on September 21, 2007, in a Jackson, Michigan hospital.

== See also ==
- List of homicides in Michigan
- List of serial killers in the United States
- List of serial killers by number of victims

== Bibliography ==
- Bell, Rachael. "Coral Eugene Watts, The Sunday Morning Slasher". Crime Library. Archived from the original on November 27, 2004.
