= Lawrence Singleton =

American murderer (1927–2001)

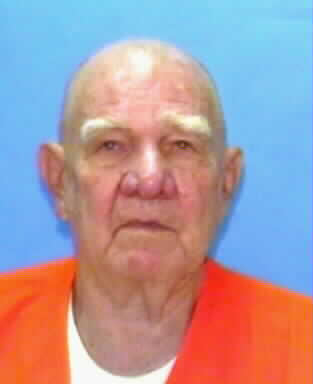
- Prison mugshot
- Born: Lawrence Bernard Singleton; July 28, 1927; Tampa, Florida, U.S.
- Died: December 28, 2001 (aged 74); Starke, Florida, U.S.
- Other names: The Mad Chopper; Larry Singleton
- Occupation: Former merchant seaman
- Status: Deceased
- Convictions: California: Rape, kidnapping, mayhem, attempted murder, child sexual abuse material, theft Florida: First-degree murder
- Penalty: California: 14 years (served 8); Florida: Death

Lawrence Bernard "Larry" Singleton (July 28, 1927 – December 28, 2001) was an American criminal who raped and mutilated adolescent hitchhiker Mary Vincent in California in September 1978, and then murdered Roxanne Hayes after being released from prison eight years later. He raped Vincent and amputated her forearms, then left her to die in a culvert off Interstate 5 in Del Puerto Canyon. She managed to stop a car, and get to safety and later acted as a critical witness against Singleton and also in the later murder trial. Released from prison on good behavior after serving eight years of his 14-year sentence, he later murdered Roxanne Hayes, a mother of three. On February 19, 1997, police found him covered in blood after stabbing her in his new home.

== Biography ==
Lawrence Singleton was born in Tampa, Florida. He worked as a merchant seaman.

== First conviction ==
On September 29, 1978, Singleton picked up 15-year-old Mary Vincent of Las Vegas, Nevada, while she was hitchhiking to her grandfather's house in Berkeley, California, after running away from her abusive step-father at home in Las Vegas. He picked her up outside of Modesto, California, after which he knocked her unconscious with a sledgehammer, spent the night raping her, and tortured her by amputating her forearms with a hatchet. Singleton figured she was dead or near death, and he threw her off a 30-foot cliff on Interstate 5 near Del Puerto Canyon, leaving her naked and bleeding out. She reduced the bleeding from her forearms by sinking them into mud, which suppressed her bleeding while she managed to pull herself back up the cliff. She walked for 3.9 miles, naked, covered in blood, and armless, before finding and alerting a passing couple who took her to a hospital. By the time of Singleton's arrest, Vincent was fitted with prosthetic arms.

Six months after the assault, Vincent faced Singleton at his trial, where her testimony helped to convict him. Singleton was sentenced to fourteen years in prison, the maximum allowed by law in California at that time. The presiding judge remarked: "If I had the power, I would send him to prison for the rest of his natural life."

While Vincent won a $2.56 million civil judgment against Singleton, she was unable to claim it as Singleton was unemployed, in poor health, and had only $200 in savings.

Along with the particularly gruesome and callous aspects of the crime, the case became even more notorious after Singleton was paroled having served only eight years in prison. He reduced his time through good behavior and working as a teaching assistant in a prison classroom. Singleton was paroled to Contra Costa County, California. Still, no town would accept his presence, so he had to live in a trailer on the grounds of San Quentin prison until his parole ended a year later.

According to Time magazine, "as authorities attempted to settle him in one Bay Area town after another, angry crowds and Tampa's chapter of Guardian Angels led protests, screamed, picketed and eventually prevailed." In Rodeo, about 25 miles northeast of San Francisco, a crowd of approximately 500 local protestors forced officers to move him under armed guard from a hotel room. Authorities tried housing him across the street from Concord's City Hall, but that was met with protests and failed too. He was removed from one apartment in Contra Costa County in a bullet-proof vest after 400 residents surrounded the building to protest a decision to place him there permanently. Governor George Deukmejian ordered that Singleton be placed in a trailer on the grounds of San Quentin for the duration of his one-year parole.

The outrage at this sentence resulted in legislation, supported by Mary Vincent, which prevents the early release of offenders who have committed a crime in which torture is used: in 1987, Singleton's parole led to passage of California's "Singleton bill", which carries a 25-years-to-life sentence. (Harrower, 1998). The leniency of the legal system shocked and outraged many. One journalist who interviewed him remarked, "What was most surprising to me, however, was not his sentence. Larry Singleton had worked his crimes around in his mind so completely that they did not warrant punishment at all." Right before Singleton's parole ended, Donald Stahl, the Stanislaus County prosecutor at Singleton's trial, said, "I think, if anything, he's worse now. He has not taken responsibility. He lives in a bizarre fantasy land and acquits himself each day. He doesn't accept his guilt and won't resolve never to do it again."

== Return to Florida ==
Singleton returned to his native Florida after his release. In 1990, he was twice convicted of theft. He served a 60-day sentence for stealing a $10 disposable camera in the spring of 1990 and, in the winter, received a two-year prison term for stealing a $3 hat. Before his sentencing for the latter crime, he described himself to the judge as "a confused, muddleheaded old man".

In the spring of 1997, a neighbor called police to report Singleton assaulting a woman in his home in Sulphur Springs, Florida. When police responded, they found the dead body of Roxanne Hayes; she had been stabbed multiple times in the upper body. Hayes was a mother of three.

Mary Vincent traveled from California to Tampa to appear at Singleton's sentencing. During her testimony, she described Singleton's attack and the toll the ordeal had taken on her. On February 20, 1998, the jury found Singleton guilty, and on April 14, 1998, the judge sentenced Singleton to death. Singleton died in 2001 of cancer in a prison hospital at the North Florida Reception Center near Starke, Florida.
