= Kidnapping of Tanya Nicole Kach =

1996 American kidnapping and sexual assault

Tanya Nicole Kach-McCrum
- Born: Tanya Nicole Kach; October 14, 1981 (age 44); U.S.
- Known for: Being held captive for ten years (1996–2006)

Thomas Hose
- Born: 1957 (age 68–69); U.S.
- Occupation: security guard at Cornell Middle School in McKeesport, Pennsylvania
- Known for: convicted and served 15 years for holding Tanya Nicole Kach captive (1996–2006)

Tanya Nicole Kach-McCrum (born October 14, 1981) is an American woman who was held captive for ten years by a security guard who worked at the school she attended. Her captor, Thomas Hose, eventually pleaded guilty to involuntary deviant sexual intercourse and other related offenses and was sentenced to five to fifteen years in prison. Ultimately, he served the full 15 years.

== Captivity ==
Thomas Hose (born 1957) was a security guard at Cornell Middle School in McKeesport, Pennsylvania, where Kach was an eighth-grade student. Hose befriended Kach, often taking her out of classes to talk to her, and one day when he caught her skipping class, he kissed her. Over time, Hose convinced Kach to run away from her family and move in with him, which she did in February 1996. She was 14 years old at the time.

For the first four years, she was not allowed out of the house. Hose lived with his parents and son, and went to great lengths to keep Kach hidden from them. She was confined entirely to his second-story bedroom, and had to go to the toilet in a bucket. In 2000, Hose created a new identity for Kach, "Nikki Allen", and introduced her to his parents as his girlfriend who would be moving in with them. After this, she was occasionally allowed to leave the house, but had a strict curfew. Six years later, she escaped.

== Escape and later life ==
After being allowed some time outside of the house, Kach began to realize that her relationship with Hose was not normal. She escaped from captivity on March 21, 2006, with the help of Joe Sparico, a grocery store owner in her neighborhood whom she had befriended, by revealing her true identity to him and asking him to send police to the house. In 2007, Hose pleaded guilty to three counts of involuntary deviant sexual intercourse, aggravated indecent assault, statutory sexual assault, interfering with the custody of a child, corruption of a minor and child endangerment. Hose was sentenced to a maximum of 15 years in prison and was released in 2022, subsequently registering as a sex offender.

Kach was happy to be reunited with her family, but has since become estranged from her father and stepmother, who, despite her being underage at the time, believed her to be partly responsible for what happened.

Since her escape, Kach attempted to sue numerous government organizations for failing her, including the police and school board. All were dismissed. She has also written a New York Times bestselling book titled Memoir of a Milk Carton Kid: The Tanya Nicole Kach Story.

== Adaptation ==
On Saturday June 8, 2024, Lifetime aired a TV movie called The Girl Locked Upstairs: The Tanya Kach Story starring Jordyn Ashley Olson as Tanya Kach and Robert Baker as Tom Hose. Elizabeth Smart serves as an executive producer.

== Other Media ==
The kidnapping was covered in 2023 on the TV series People Magazine Investigates in the episode "Held Captive: The Disappearance of Tanya Kach."

== See also ==
- List of kidnappings (1990–1999)
- List of solved missing person cases (1990s)
- List of long-term false imprisonment cases
