= Andrew Urdiales =

American serial killer (1964–2018)

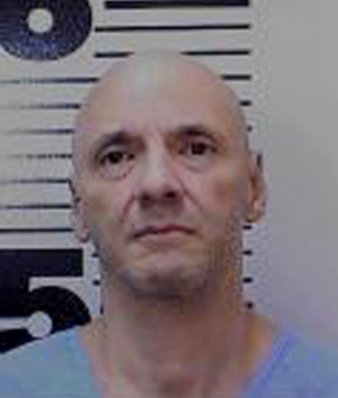
- Urdiales in 2018
- Born: June 4, 1964; Chicago, Illinois, U.S.
- Died: November 2, 2018 (aged 54); San Quentin State Prison, San Quentin, California, U.S.
- Cause of death: Suicide by hanging
- Status: Deceased
- Convictions: Illinois; First degree murder (3 counts); California; First degree murder with special circumstances (5 counts)
- Penalty: Illinois; Death; commuted to life imprisonment California; Death

Details
- Victims: 9
- Span of crimes: 1986–1996
- Country: United States
- States: Illinois, Indiana, California
- Date apprehended: April 23, 1997

Andrew Urdiales (June 4, 1964 – November 2, 2018) was an American serial killer who was convicted in Illinois in 2002 of killing three women and convicted in California in 2018 of killing five women. He was sentenced to death in California and died by suicide a few months later in California's San Quentin Prison.

== Life ==
=== Early life ===
Andrew Urdiales was born on June 4, 1964, in Chicago, Illinois. Little is known about his childhood. In June 1977, shortly before his 13th birthday, he beat the family dog to death with a baseball bat and told his parents the animal had been fatally injured in a fall. He attended Thornridge High School in Dolton, and graduated in 1982. After graduating, Urdiales joined the United States Marine Corps.

Between 1984 and 1991, he was stationed at the Marine Corps Base Camp Pendleton in California. Urdiales completed combat training. He was trained as a radio operator at Marine Corps base in Twentynine Palms and then served in Desert Storm.

=== Murders ===
Urdiales committed his first murder on the evening of January 18, 1986. At Saddleback Community College in Mission Viejo, California, he stalked 23-year-old communication arts student Robbin Brandley and stabbed her 41 times with a knife. Two years later, on July 17, 1988, he shot 29-year-old Julie McGhee with a .45 ACP caliber pistol. Her body was found in a ditch near Cathedral City, California. Two months later, Urdiales struck in San Diego, killing 31-year-old Mary Ann Wells, whose body was found by police on September 25, 1988, in an abandoned warehouse. His fourth victim, 18-year-old Tammie Erwin, was found on the streets of Palm Springs on April 17, 1989.

In 1991, he was honorably discharged from the Marine Corps and moved back to his parents' home in Chicago. In September 1992, however, he returned to California for a holiday. On the evening of September 27, 1992, he encountered 19-year-old nurse Jennifer Asbenson, who was in need of a ride to work. Upon dropping her off, he asked for her phone number. Asbenson gave him a fake number. When she finished her shift, Urdiales was waiting outside and offered her a ride home, which she accepted. As he drove, Urdiales confronted the young woman about the fake phone number and began to assault her, tying her hands and cutting off her clothes. He attempted to rape her, but he was unable to perform. Asbenson called him a "coward", begging him to just kill her. Urdiales beat her, bit her neck to the point she bled, and then put her in the trunk of his car. Asbenson was eventually able to untie her hands and open the trunk from the inside and escape. She ran down the highway naked from the waist down. Urdiales chased after her with a machete but she was able to flag down a truck with two marines in it, and Urdiales escaped in his own vehicle. The authorities had no evidence other than the bite on Asbenson's neck and the description of her attacker. His tire tracks had been destroyed by a bulldozer that happened to go down that path.

For three years he committed no murders due to fear of being discovered. When he returned to California in March 1995, he happened upon 31-year-old sex worker Denise Maney in Cathedral City, California. Urdiales forced her into his car and drove her into the California desert. There he shot her, undressed her, and left the corpse for scavengers.

As a security guard in a Chicago mall, he enjoyed great trust among customers in the family friendly environment. He crossed the state line into Bloomington, Indiana in April 1996, where he murdered 25-year-old Laura Ulyaki. Her body was found on April 14 in Wolf Lake on the border of Chicago (Cook County, Illinois) and Hammond, Indiana. On July 14, 1996, police found the body of 21-year-old Cassandra Corum in the Vermilion River in Livingston County, Illinois. On August 2, 1996, the body of 22-year-old Lynn Huber was found in Wolf Lake. Huber is presumed to have been Urdiales' last victim.

In December 1996, Urdiales was arrested for possession of an unlicensed weapon but was released after paying a fine.

=== Arrest and prosecution ===
Urdiales was arrested on April 23, 1997, when the police wanted to check his gun in connection to the ongoing series of murders. While ballistics tests were ongoing, Urdiales made a full confession to all eight murders. The subsequent lab tests supported Urdiales' confession and his involvement in the murders of Ulyaki, Corum and Huber. In collaboration with the California police, Illinois law enforcement agencies began drafting the indictment. Urdiales had no rational motive and said he was agitated when the women had begged for their lives.

On April 29, 1997, an indictment was brought against Urdiales. However, legal and political debates delayed the trial opening for four years. The question was whether Urdiales should be punished with the death penalty. At that time in Illinois, there was discussion as to whether the death penalty should be completely abolished. On April 30, 2001, the prosecutor decided to request the death penalty. Urdiales' trial for the murders of Ulyaki and Huber opened on April 8, 2002. Urdiales was found guilty of two murders on May 23, 2002, and sentenced to death seven days later on May 30, 2002.

Urdiales' case became a political issue for a short time. After a study by Northwestern University concluded that some death row inmates had been innocent, and that innocence no longer could be judicially recognized, then-Governor of Illinois, George Ryan, determined on January 11, 2003, that all 167 people sentenced to death in Illinois at that time would have their sentences commuted to life imprisonment. Urdiales also fell under this commutation. Therefore, his first death sentence was commuted. Subsequently, the prosecution prepared an indictment for the previously unresolved Cassandra Corum murder case. The process was opened on April 24, 2004. Urdiales, encouraged by defender Stephen Richards, changed his tactics, pleading guilty but claiming that he was mentally ill. Presiding Judge Harold Frobish nonetheless re-sentenced Urdiales to death on May 10, 2004. This death sentence – Urdiales's second – was commuted to life in prison in March 2011 when Governor Pat Quinn signed into law legislation that abolished the death penalty in Illinois.

At this time, Urdiales was incarcerated in the Menard Correctional Center in Chester, Illinois.

== California prosecution ==
Within hours of Illinois Governor Quinn's decision to commute Urdiales's death sentence in that state, prosecutors in Orange County, California sought to extradite Urdiales to be tried in California for the murders of five women in the 1980s when Urdiales was stationed at Marine Corps Base Camp Pendleton and after he was discharged from the military.

On May 23, 2018, Urdiales was convicted in the murders of five Southern California women. On Wednesday, June 13, 2018, a jury rendered a death verdict for Urdiales. The jury deliberated for one day. On October 5, 2018, Urdiales was sentenced to death for the third time.

== Death ==
On November 2, 2018, at around 11:15 PM, Urdiales was found unresponsive in his cell in the Adjustment Center of San Quentin State Prison. Urdiales was alone in his cell, and prison officials said the apparent cause of death was suicide by hanging. He was 54 years old.

== See also ==
- List of serial killers in the United States

== Sources and further literature ==
- Michael Newton: The Encyclopedia of Serial Killers. 5. updated and expanded edition. Graz 2009, 534 Seiten, ISBN 978-3-85365-240-4.
- Peter Murakami, Julia Murakami: Dictionary of serial killers. 450 case studies of a pathological killing type. Ullstein Tb, München März 2000, 639 Seiten, ISBN 3-548-35935-3.
- “Confessions of a Serial Killer Part 1 and 2”, Inside Evil with Chris Cuomo, HLN (parent company CNN), 6/30/2019, American Pay Television News Channel.
