= 2007 Trolley Square shooting =

Mass shooting in Utah, U.S.

Trolley Square shooting
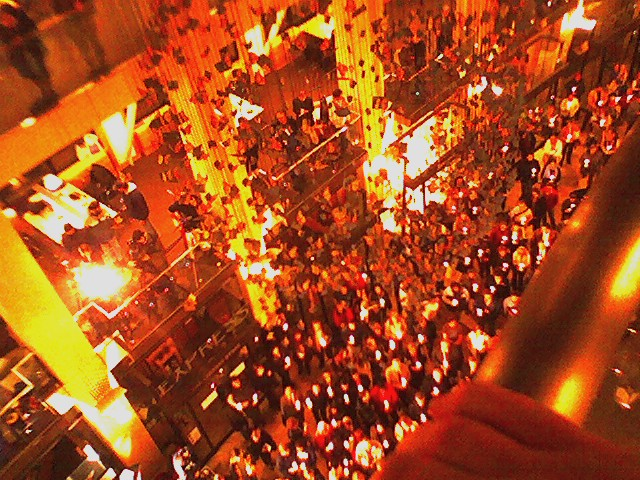
- Candlelight vigil for victims at the Salt Lake City Public Library on February 15, 2007
- Location: 40°45′26″N 111°52′21″W; Salt Lake City, Utah, U.S.
- Date: February 12, 2007; 6:44 – 6:50 p.m. (MST)
- Target: Trolley Square
- Attack type: Mass shooting; mass murder; mass killing; shootout
- Weapons: 12-gauge Mossberg Maverick 88 Security 6-shot pump-action shotgun w/ pistol grip; Smith & Wesson Model 36 .38-caliber revolver
- Deaths: 7 (including the perpetrator and a victim who died in 2023)
- Injuries: 3
- Perpetrator: Sulejman Talović

During the evening of February 12, 2007, a mass shooting occurred at Trolley Square in Salt Lake City, Utah, United States. 18-year-old Sulejman Talović opened fire with a shotgun and a revolver at people at the mall, most of whom were shot at a card store located inside the mall. Talović was killed by responding police officers, and six people were killed as a result of the attack (including one victim who died in 2023) and three others were injured.

No motive was found by investigators for the shooting. The man who sold Talović the revolver used in the attack was sentenced to 15 months in federal prison, and three other men were given probation sentences for their roles in selling the revolver or shotgun to Talović.

== Events ==
=== Shooting ===
On February 12, 2007, at 6:42 p.m. MST, Talović arrived at the Trolley Square Mall, parking his vehicle in the upper level of the mall's west parking garage. He was wearing a white shirt, a tan trench coat, and was carrying a pistol grip 6-shot 12-gauge pump-action shotgun, a 38-caliber revolver , and a backpack full of extra ammunition. Two minutes after exiting his vehicle, Talović encountered 52-year-old Jeffrey Walker and his 16-year-old son Alan in the parking garage. He shot and wounded both in the head with his shotgun; Alan Walker managed to run down a staircase to the lower parking level, where he was assisted by other citizens. However, Talović stood over Jeffrey Walker, who had fallen to the ground after being shot, and shot him repeatedly in the head and back, killing him.

Continuing onward to the west entrance of the mall, Talović shot 34-year-old Shawn Munns twice with the shotgun from approximately 30 yards away. Munns managed to flee the scene and survive his injuries. Talović then fired twice at the entrance doors, causing shoppers inside the store to hide or flee. Entering the mall, he approached the west stairs, where he fired at a security guard, missing, then walked down the main level hallway in the opposite direction. There, he shot 29-year-old Vanessa Quinn in the chest with his revolver; when she fell to the ground, Talović stood over her and killed her with a second gunshot to the head.

Talović then entered Cabin Fever, a card store where seven people were hiding. He first approached 44-year-old Carolyn Tuft, who was crouched down near a display table at the front of the store, and shot her in the left side and arm with the shotgun, causing her to fall over to the ground. He then spotted 53-year-old Stacy Hanson crouching near the southeast glass wall of the store. Hanson said to him "Everyone just wants to go home," to which Talović told him to "Shut up!" before shooting and injuring him in the lower abdomen and arm with the shotgun, also shattering the glass wall; Hanson fell face-down into the glass.

Talović then approached a group of three people: 15-year-old Kirsten Hinckley (whose mother was the injured Carolyn Tuft), 24-year-old Brad Frantz, and 29-year-old Teresa Ellis. All three victims were lying on the floor in the southern front of the store. Talović fired from his shotgun, hitting all three people. Frantz died of a gunshot wound to the forehead, while Hinckley suffered a wound to the torso and Ellis suffered wounds to the right arm, torso, and leg. He then left the store briefly to reload, during which Carolyn Tuft crawled towards her injured daughter. Talović returned, shooting Tuft, Hinckley, and Ellis again; Hinckley and Ellis both died of gunshot wounds to the head, while Tuft survived a wound to the back.

=== Police response ===
Leaving Cabin Fever a second time, Talović encountered off-duty police officer Kenneth Hammond of the Ogden City Police Department. At the time, Hammond was at Trolley Square on an early Valentine's Day dinner with his pregnant wife, 911 dispatcher Sarita Hammond, when they heard gunshots. Sarita Hammond borrowed a waiter's cell phone to call 911. Drawing his weapon, Hammond identified himself as a police officer, and Talović fired twice at him with his shotgun, missing. Moving around the central hallway area, Talović focused his gunfire at three restaurant employees, firing from near the south entrance of the Pottery Barn Kids home-furnishing store. Witnessing him returning to Cabin Fever and shooting Stacy Hanson in the back, an employee, Barrett Dodds, yelled at Talović, prompting him to walk back towards Pottery Barn. Hanson initially survived his injuries, but was paralyzed, and died from his injuries 16 years later on November 5th, 2023.

Meanwhile, Sergeant Andrew Oblad of the Salt Lake City Police Department entered Trolley Square through the south entrance and encountered Kenneth Hammond. Talović fired at both officers, and Hammond fired back in return. An active shooter contact team composed of Salt Lake City PD SWAT team members Sergeant Joshua Scharman, Detective Dustin Marshall, Detective Brett Olsen, and Officer Gordon Worsencroft eventually arrived and confronted Talović from behind. Scharman and Olsen shot him a total of eight times in the back with their Heckler & Koch MP5 service weapons, and Marshall also shot him five times with his AR-15 service rifle. When Talović turned around and aimed his shotgun towards the team, Scharman and Olsen fired again and killed him. Talović's body was later found to have been struck a total of 15 times by bullets fired by police. At least 30 rounds were fired by Talović, 29 of which came from his shotgun and at least one from his revolver. The entire shooting lasted for six minutes.

According to local TV station KTVX, several witnesses reported that most of the shooting took place on the ground floor near the Pottery Barn store, though the majority of the dead and injured were found in Cabin Fever. One of the victims, having been shot, apparently entered the nearby Hard Rock Cafe and told customers to lock the doors. The wounded victims were transported to local hospitals, some in critical condition.

At a news conference the following day after the shooting, Chief Chris Burbank shared the victims' names and later worked to initiate a public conversation about preventing individuals with mental illness from accessing firearms.

=== Victims ===
Killed

- Jeffrey Walker, 52 (shot at the west parking garage)
- Vanessa Quinn, 29 (shot at the main level hallway)
- Brad Frantz, 24 (shot inside Cabin Fever)
- Kirsten Hinckley, 15 (shot inside Cabin Fever)
- Teresa Ellis, 29 (shot inside Cabin Fever)
- Stacy Hanson, 53 (shot inside Cabin Fever) Initially injured by shotgun, death declared a homicide in April of 2024.

Injured

- Alan "A.J." Walker, 16 (son of Jeffrey Walker, shot at the west parking garage)
- Shawn Munns, 34 (shot near the west entrance)
- Carolyn Tuft, 43 (mother of Kirsten Hinckley, shot inside Cabin Fever)

== Perpetrator ==
Sulejman Talović (October 6, 1988 – February 12, 2007) was identified as the perpetrator of the shooting. He was born in Cerska, a town in the Vlasenica municipality of Bosnia and Herzegovina, and later immigrated with his family to the United States in 1998. Talović was a permanent resident who received a green card in 2005 and lived with his mother, father and three sisters in Salt Lake City at the time of the shooting. As a child, Talovic frequently spent time at the mall, and it was described as "the only place he went." The family at one point lived one block away. He had a record of minor juvenile incidents and had dropped out of high school at age 16.

After the shooting, Talović was buried in his birthplace, the small village of Talovići near Cerska, Bosnia and Herzegovina, on March 2, 2007. Sulejman's father Suljo Talović soon moved back to Bosnia and told media outlets that he was too sad and ashamed to stay living in a country where his son committed mass murder.

=== Motive ===
Talović's aunt Ajka Omerović emerged briefly from the family's house to say relatives had no idea why he attacked so many strangers. She said that Talović had lived in Sarajevo as a child, and that his family moved to Utah from Bosnia. "He was such a good boy. I don't know what happened," she told Salt Lake City television station KSL-TV.

In another KSL interview, with Omerović, and Talović's father, Suljo Talović, the two indicated concern that some outside influence might have induced Sulejman to commit the killings. "I think this [Sulejman] did. I think somebody (is) behind him, I think, but I am not sure...."

The father suggested that the U.S. government bears some responsibility for his son's actions, saying "The authorities are guilty for not alerting us that he bought a gun. In the U.S., you cannot buy cigarettes if you are under-aged, but you can buy a gun." Federal law prohibits the sale of handguns and handgun ammunition to those under 21 from federally licensed gun dealers although some states allow 18+ to purchase handguns through legal private sales. Long guns (being a rifle or shotgun) and rifle/shotgun ammunition are prohibited to those under 18. Talović had bought the guns in a pawn shop.

In the light of the war on terrorism some commentators, including John Gibson and U.S. Representative Chris Cannon suggested that Talović repeatedly shouted "Allahu Akbar" prior to his death, suggesting a religious motive, citing video of the rampage which supposedly captures Talović's religious shouting. After being told that police investigators had not uncovered any evidence to support his claims, Cannon's spokesman said the congressman accepts that Talović did not yell anything of a religious nature. FBI agent Patrick Kiernan stated that he had no reason to suspect terrorism. Ajka Omerović was quoted as saying, "We are Muslims, but we are not terrorists."

== Officers honored ==
Five officers were honored at the Utah State Capitol on February 16 for their bravery in the Trolley Square shooting.

They are Sergeant Andrew Oblad, Sergeant Joshua Scharman, Detective Dustin Marshall, and Detective Brett Olsen, all of the Salt Lake City Police Department; and Officer Kenneth Hammond of the Ogden Police Department.

On February 13, 2007, Salt Lake City police officials thanked Hammond as a hero for saving countless lives.

On March 2, 2009, Kenneth Hammond, who had quit his police job by then, pleaded no contest to sexual battery in relation to a 2005 incident involving a 17 year old girl. On April 21, he was sentenced to 90 days in jail, followed by a year of supervised release, and a $370 fine.

== Litigation ==
Four people were charged in connection with the shooting.

Mackenzie Glade Hunter pleaded guilty to selling the .38 revolver to the assailant. The revolver was sold in June-July 2006 for $800. In January 2008, Hunter was sentenced to 15 months in federal prison, followed by 36 months of supervised release. Hunter died from an overdose in 2017.

Brenden Taylor Brown was sentenced to 12 months of probation for also selling the revolver. He was later sentenced to 2 months in jail for violating his probation.

Matthew Hautala was sentenced to a year of probation. After violating his probation by being charged in Wyoming with drug dealing and burglary, he was sentenced to 9 months in federal prison.

Westley Wayne Hill sold the shotgun to the assailant on November 13 at a pawnshop. He was the last of the four men to plead guilty, doing so in late November 2007. He was sentenced to a year of probation and a $500 fine.

In May 2008, injured victims and family members of victims filed lawsuits against the pawnshop and Westley Hill. These lawsuits were settled for an undisclosed amount in April 2013.

== See also ==
- Ward Parkway Shopping Center shooting
- Hudson Valley Mall shooting
- Tacoma Mall shooting
- Westroads Mall shooting
- Sello mall shooting
