= 2012 Tunnel Creek avalanche =

Fatal snow avalanche in Washington state, US

Coordinates: 47.7277°N 121.1069°W

Location in the United States
Location in Washington

The 2012 Tunnel Creek avalanche occurred in the northwest United States on February 19, 2012. It happened at about noon PST in the Tunnel Creek section of Stevens Pass, a mountain pass through the Cascade Mountains of Washington, at the border of King and Chelan counties. There were three fatalities and one injured.

The avalanche was characterized as a slab avalanche, or 200 feet (60 m) across and three feet (0.9 m) deep. Three days before the avalanche occurred, a large snow storm dumped 32 inches (0.8 m) into Stevens Pass, which resulted in the unstable snow pack that was disrupted by skiers on their excursion.

== Avalanche ==
The avalanche was triggered when sixteen of the nation's top free skiers and free snowboarders were making a run together. They had been gathered by Chris Rudolph, a charismatic marketing director at the attached ski area. One or more of the skiers triggered the avalanche 300 feet (90 m) below the top of the mountain. Starting at an elevation of 5,800 feet (1,770 m) and a slope of 42 degrees, it rushed down a vertical drop of 2,650 feet (810 m), carrying away five skiers.

One of the skiers wedged himself between two trees and avoided being swept away as the avalanche rushed over him. Another skier, Elyse Saugstad, deployed an avalanche survival airbag and suffered minor injuries, despite being trapped until her fellow skiers rescued her. The remaining three skiers, Jim Jack, Chris Rudolph and John Brenan, were killed through a combination of blunt force trauma and asphyxia.

The Wellington avalanche of 1910, the deadliest in U.S. history with 96 fatalities, occurred in the vicinity 102 years earlier. It happened about a mile (1.6 km) to the northwest, along the Great Northern Railway, in the early hours of March 1.

== Media coverage ==
The avalanche attracted a high level of media attention because of the experience and notoriety of all sixteen skiers and snowboarders on the trip. Participants included professional competitive skiers and members of the freeskiing media, including reporters and a photographer from Powder Magazine. In December 2012, The New York Times published an interactive multimedia feature piece called "Snow Fall" that was critically acclaimed, including winning the 2013 Pulitzer Prize for Feature Writing.
