= 2008 in aviation =

This is a list of aviation-related events in 2008.

== Events ==
=== January ===
- 4 January – A Transaven Let L-410 Turbolet crashes near the Los Roques archipelago off Venezuela, killing all 14 on board.
- 12 January – A Macedonian Army Mil Mi-17 helicopter crashes in thick fog southeast of Skopje, killing all 11 military personnel on board.
- 17 January – British Airways Flight 38, a Boeing 777-236ER with 152 people on board, lands short of the runway at London Heathrow Airport. Forty-seven people – of which nine receive medical treatment – suffer minor injuries, but there are no fatalities. The aircraft becomes the first Boeing 777 to be written off.
- 23 January – A Polish Air Force EADS CASA C-295M crashes near Mirosławiec, killing 20 Polish Air Force officers aboard, including Brigadier General Andrzej Andrzejewski.

=== February ===
- The last flight of a Martin 4-0-4 takes place, when the last airworthy 4-0-4, a former Trans World Airlines airliner, makes a ferry flight to the Planes of Fame Museum in Valle, Arizona.
- 3 February – Silver State Helicopters ceases operations and enters bankruptcy. At the time of closing Silver State operated 194 helicopters from its 34 flight schools.
- 8 February – Eagle Airways Flight 2279, a BAe Jetstream 32 is hijacked ten minutes after taking off from Blenheim, New Zealand by a passenger who attacked both pilots. The hijacker is eventually restrained by the co-pilot and the flight lands safely at Christchurch. All nine people on board survive the incident.
- 14 February – Belavia Flight 1834, a Bombardier CRJ200, hits its left wing on the runway while taking off from Yerevan, Armenia. All 21 people on board escape the aircraft before it erupts into flames.
- 21 February – Santa Bárbara Airlines Flight 518, an ATR 42-300, crashes shortly after taking off from Mérida, Venezuela, killing all 46 people on board.
- 23 February – A United States Air Force B-2 Spirit bomber crashes shortly after takeoff from Andersen Air Force Base in Guam. Both pilots eject from the plane before it crashes.
- 28 February – Boston-Maine Airways, operating as Pan Am Clipper Connection, ceases operations.

=== March ===
- The People's Republic of China makes the Civil Aviation Administration of China a component of the Ministry of Transport.
- 30 March
  - The EU–US Open Skies Agreement goes into effect. It allows any airline of the European Union (EU) and any airline of the United States to fly between any point in the European Union and any point in the United States. It also allows airlines of the United States to fly between points in the European Union, and airlines of the European Union to fly between the United States and non-EU countries like Switzerland.
  - British race car drivers Richard Lloyd and David Leslie are killed along with all of the other three people on board when a Cessna 500 Citation I Lloyd is piloting crashes into homes in a residential area of Farnborough, London shortly after takeoff from London Biggin Hill Airport.
- 31 March – Aloha Airlines ceases operations and declares bankruptcy. It halts all passenger operations and transfers all of its cargo operations to Aloha Air Cargo.

=== April ===
- 3 April
  - An Antonov An-28 operated by Blue Wing Airlines crashes near Benzdorp in Suriname. All 19 people on board are killed.
  - ATA Airlines ceases operations due to bankruptcy.
- 5 April – Skybus Airlines ceases operations, citing the poor economy and rising fuel prices.
- 15 April – Hewa Bora Airways Flight 122, a McDonnell Douglas DC-9-30 with 94 people on board, experiences an engine fire during takeoff at Goma International Airport. It overruns the runway and crashes into homes, shops, and market stalls in a residential area of Goma, killing three people on the aircraft and 37 people on the ground. Another 40 people on the aircraft and 71 people on the ground suffer injuries.
- 27 April – Bankrupt Eos Airlines ceases operations.

=== May ===
- 15 May – Aloha Air Cargo commences operations as an independent airline after Aloha Airlines has ceased operations.
- 30 May
  - The British all-business-class airline Silverjet ceases operations. It was the last all-business-class airline in service.
  - TACA Flight 390, an Airbus A320-233, overruns the runway on landing at Toncontín International Airport in Tegucigalpa, Honduras, rolls onto a street, collides with several cars, and crashes into an embankment. Three people on the plane – including Nicaraguan businessman Harry Brautigam – and two on the ground die, and 65 other people suffer injuries.
- 31 May – Champion Air ceases operations, citing high fuel prices and fuel inefficiency as the two main reasons it is going out of business.

=== June ===
- The Spanish low-cost airlines Clickair and Vueling announce that they plan to merge.
- 2 June – Aeroméxico Travel, operated by Aeroméxico , commences operations.
- 10 June – Fire engulfs Sudan Airways Flight 109, an Airbus A310-300 carrying 214 people, after it crashes and breaks apart on landing at Khartoum International Airport in Khartoum, Sudan. Thirty of those on board die, and six are unaccounted for.

=== July ===
- 3 July – Jat Airways establishes the first commercial air links between Serbia and Croatia since the outbreak of the Yugoslav Wars in 1991.
- 31 July – A Hawker 800 business jet crashed after failing to go around in Owatonna Degner Regional Airport, killing 8.

=== August ===
- 5 August - 2008 Carson Helicopters Iron 44 crash - a Sikorsky S-61N helicopter, N612AZ, operated by Carson Helicopters, impacted trees and terrain during its initial climb after taking off from Helispot 44 near Weaverville, California, while transporting firefighters under contract to the U.S. Forest Service. The pilot and eight firefighters were killed.
- 17 August – All five crew and passengers are killed aboard two light aircraft that collide in mid-air while on final approach to Coventry Airport in England.
- 20 August – Spanair Flight 5022, a McDonnell Douglas MD-82, crashes shortly after takeoff from Madrid Barajas Airport. Of 172 on board, just 18 survive. It is the world's worst aviation accident in 2008 and Spain's worst in 25 years.
- 24 August – Iran Aseman Airlines Flight 6895 crashes upon takeoff near Manas International Airport in Bishkek, Kyrgyzstan, killing 68.
- 28 August – Zoom Airlines ceases operations due to financial struggles.

=== September ===
- 2 September – ExpressJet Airlines ends operations as an independent carrier.
- 12 September – The British charter airline XL Airways UK, a subsidiary of the XL Leisure Group, ceases operations with immediate effect, due to a deteriorating financial position. 90,000 Britons holidaying abroad are left stranded. It had been the 3rd largest package holiday group in the UK. XL Airways France and Germany are sold and continue operations.
- 14 September – Aeroflot Flight 821, operated by Aeroflot Nord, crashes on approach to Perm Airport, killing all 82 passengers and six crew members. Following the accident and concerns about safety procedures, Aeroflot chief executive Valery Okulov announces Awefolfot will be stripping Aeroflot-Nord of the right to use the brand name Aeroflot and would be severing all ties between the companies.
- 30 September
  - The Philippine airline Asian Spirit announces its rebranding as Zest Airways.
  - Almaty International Airport in Almaty, Kazakhstan, opens its second runway, the longest runway in Central Asia. The first aircraft to use the new runway is a BMI airliner which takes off for a flight to Heathrow Airport in London.

=== October ===
- 1 October
  - The Japanese Aircraft and Railway Accidents Investigation Commission merges with the Japan Marine Accident Inquiry Agency to form the Japan Transport Safety Board, which becomes responsible for investigating aviation accidents in Japan.
  - The United States Air Force reactivates the Seventeenth Air Force for service as a component of United States Africa Command. The Seventeenth Air Force had been inactive since September 1996.
  - The wreckage of the Bellanca Super Decathlon of American aviation adventurer Steve Fossett – who had disappeared during a flight on 3 September 2007 – is discovered; his remains will be found on 29 October. An investigation determines that he had crashed into a granite cliff 7 miles (11 km) from Mammoth Lakes, California, at an altitude of 10,000 feet (3,000 meters).
- 6 October – Sun Country Airlines files for Chapter 11 Bankruptcy Protection for a second time.
- 8 October – Yeti Airlines Flight 103 crashes on final approach to Tenzing-Hillary Airport in Lukla, Nepal, killing 18 of the 19 people on board.
- 29 October
  - Northwest Airlines is merged into Delta Air Lines.
  - Peruvian Airlines begins flight operations.

=== December ===
- 20 December – After hearing a bumping or rattling sound near the end of their takeoff roll at Denver International Airport in Denver, Colorado, the flight crew of Continental Airlines Flight 1404, a Boeing 737-524 with 115 people on board, aborts their takeoff. The plane veers off the runway and crashes. There are no fatalities, but 38 people on board are injured, two of them critically, and the aircraft is written off.

== Deaths ==
=== January ===
- 18 January – Bertram James, 92, British veteran of the Royal Air Force who survived the "Great Escape" from Stalag Luft III.
- 23 January – Andrzej Andrzejewski, 46, Polish Air Force general, in the crash of an EADS CASA C-295.

=== February ===
- 11 February – Frank Piasecki, 88, creator and pilot of America's second successful helicopter, the PV-2, and creator of the tandem-rotor helicopter design.

=== March ===
- 3 March
  - Donald S. Lopez Sr., 84, United States Army Air Forces and United States Air Force fighter and test pilot and deputy director of the Smithsonian Institution's National Air and Space Museum.
  - Norman "Hurricane" Smith, 85, English musician, record producer, and audio engineer who served as a Royal Air Force glider pilot during World War II.
- 6 March – Albert William Baker, 89, Canadian aviator and aeronautical engineer.
- 15 March – Vicki Van Meter, 26, American pilot, youngest-pilot distance-flying record setter; committed suicide.
- 20 March – Ann Baumgartner, 89, first American woman to fly a jet.
- 25 March – Jimmy Dell, 83, British test pilot
- 26 March – Wally Phillips, 82, World War II United States Army Air Forces veteran who later became a radio personality.

=== April ===
- 7 April – Joe Shell, 89, California politician who was a World War II United States Navy pilot.
- 8 April – Diana Barnato Walker, 90, English aviator and horse rider, the first British woman to break the sound barrier.
- 11 April – Harry Goonatilake, 78, Sri Lankan Air Chief Marshal, Commander of the Air Force from 1976 to 1981.

=== June ===
- 3 June – Tadeusz Kotz, 94, World War II Polish fighter ace.
- 5 June – Frank Blackmore, 92, British traffic engineer who was a Royal Air Force veteran.
- 8 June – Gene Damschroder, 86, American politician and World War II pilot, in a plane crash.
- 16 June – Bert Shepard, 87, American Major League Baseball player who served as a World War II United States Army Air Forces fighter pilot.

=== July ===
- 23 July – Dick Johnson, 85, American glider pilot and aeronautical engineer, in a plane crash.
- 28 July – Margaret Ringenberg, 87, American aviator who logged more than 40,000 hours of flight time, of natural causes.

=== September ===
- 3 September – Donald Blakeslee, 90, World War II United States Army Air Forces fighter ace.
- 16 September – John Fancy, 95, British World War II Royal Air Force airman.

=== October ===
- 3 October – Edsel Dunford, 73, American aerospace engineer, of cancer.
- 6 October – Richard Heyser, 81, American U-2 pilot during the 1962 Cuban Missile Crisis.

== First flights ==
=== February ===
- 6 February – Falcomposite Furio carbon-fibre kit aircraft
- 19 February – Sukhoi Su-35 (NATO reporting name "Flanker-E")

=== March ===
- 8 March – Cessna 162 Skycatcher (conforming prototype)

=== April ===
- 29 April – Embraer Phenom 300

=== May ===
- 19 May – Sukhoi Superjet 100's maiden flight.

=== July ===
- 3 July – Cirrus Vision SF50's maiden flight.
- 30 July – Piper PA-47 PiperJet

=== August ===
- 27 August – Sikorsky X2

=== September ===
- 3 September – Bombardier CRJ1000

=== November ===
- 28 November – Comac ARJ21

=== December ===
- 18 December – Schweizer 434
- 21 December – Scaled Composites White Knight Two

== Retirements ==
=== March ===
- 20 March – BAE Systems Phoenix UAV by the British Army.

== Deadliest crash ==
The deadliest crash of this year was Spanair Flight 5022, a McDonnell Douglas MD-80 which crashed on takeoff in Madrid, Spain on 20 August, killing 154 of the 172 people on board.
