= AAIC =

AAIC may refer to:

- Alzheimer's Association International Conference; see Alzheimer's Association#Alzheimer's Association International Conference
- Aircraft Accident Investigation Commission, government agency, Japan
- Aircraft Accident Investigation Committee, government agency, Thailand
