= Shin Seibijō Station =

Monorail station in Tokyo, Japan

MO09 Shin Seibijō Station 新整備場駅
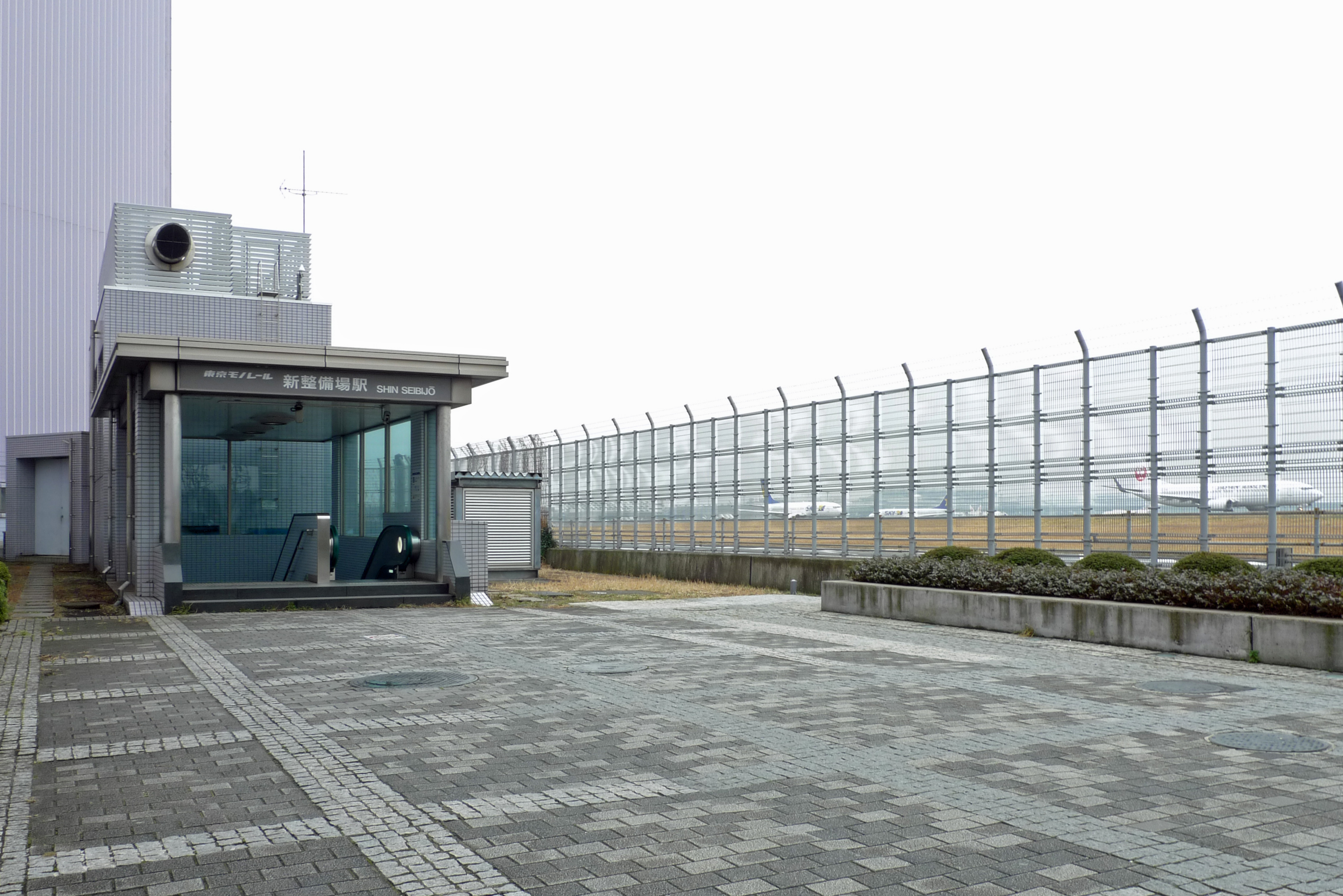
- The station entrance in February 2015

General information
- Location: 3-5-1 Haneda Kūkō, Ōta-ku, Tokyo; Japan
- Coordinates: 35.5429°N 139.7875°E
- Operator: Tokyo Monorail
- Line: Tokyo Monorail Haneda Airport Line
- Distance: 16.1 km (10.0 mi) from Monorail Hamamatsuchō
- Platforms: 2 side platforms
- Tracks: 2

Construction
- Structure type: Underground

Other information
- Website: Official website

History
- Opened: 27 September 1993; 32 years ago

Passengers
- FY2011: 3,156 daily

Services
Preceding station	Tokyo Monorail	Following station
Haneda Airport Terminal 3 MO08 towards Monorail Hamamatsuchō	Haneda Airport Line Local	Haneda Airport Terminal 1 MO10 towards Haneda Airport Terminal 2
Location
- Location within Special wards of Tokyo Location within Tokyo Location within Japan

Shin Seibijō Station (新整備場駅, Shin-Seibijō-eki; lit. "New Maintenance facility Station") is a station on the Tokyo Monorail in Ōta, Tokyo, Japan.

== Lines ==
Shin Seibijō Station is served by the 17.8 km (11.1 mi) Tokyo Monorail Haneda Airport Line from Monorail Hamamatsuchō in central Tokyo to Haneda Airport Terminal 2, and lies 16.1 km (10.0 mi) from the northern terminus of the line at Monorail Hamamatsuchō. Only all-stations "Local" services stop at this station.

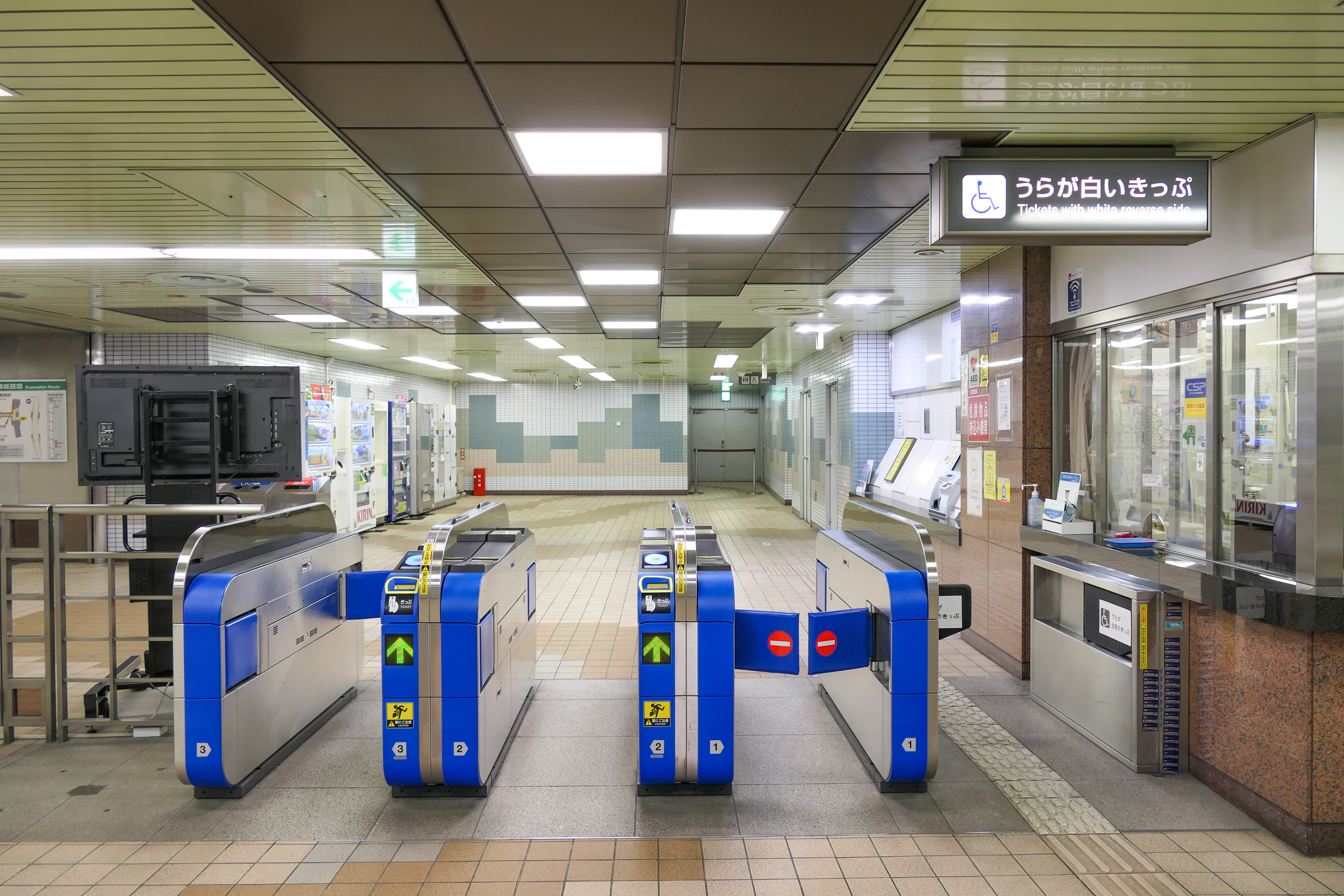
The ticket barriers in September 2021

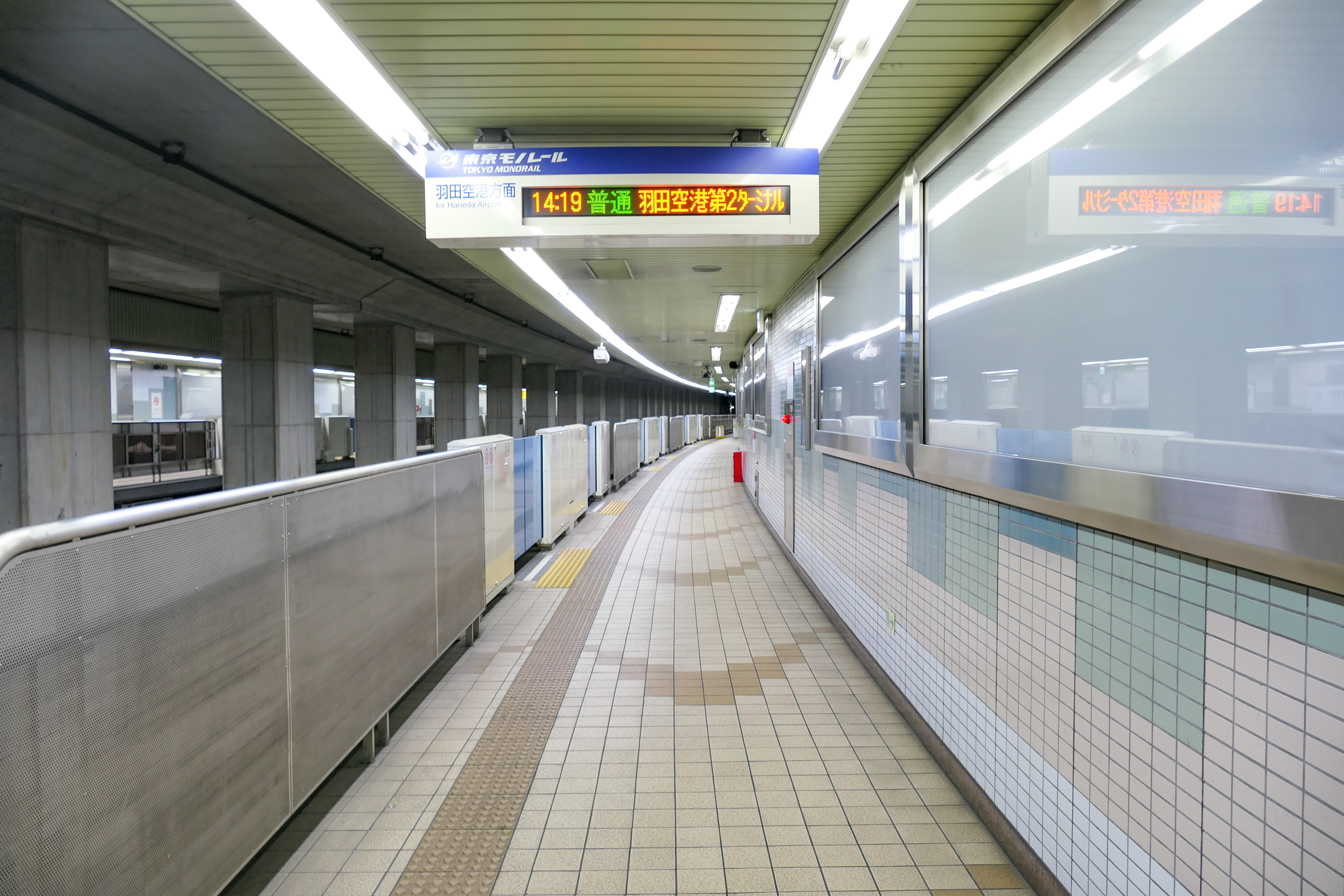
The 1 platform in September 2021

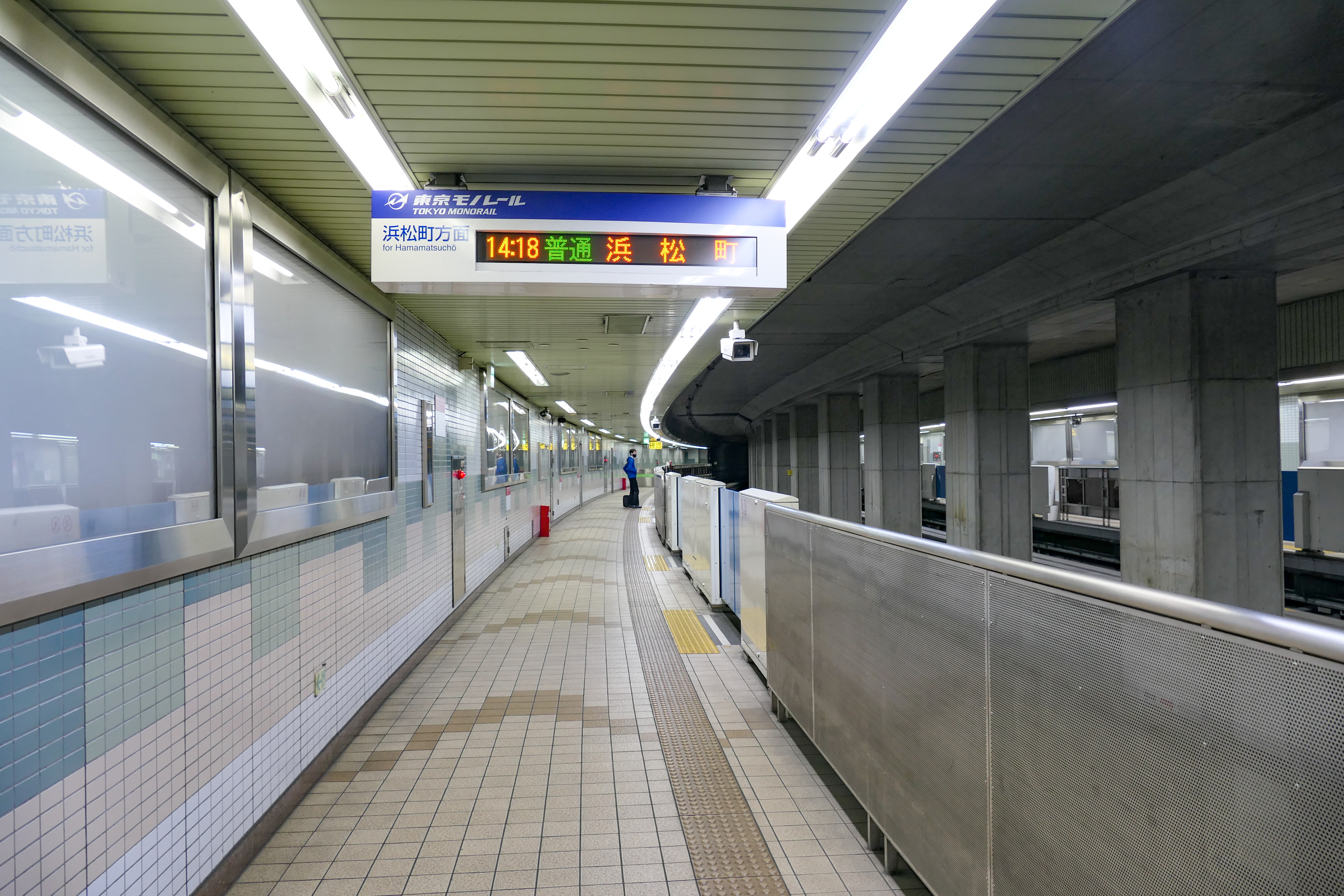
The 2 platform in September 2021

== History ==
The station opened on 27 September 1993.

== Passenger statistics ==
Year	# of passengers	Source
1993	1,425	
1994	1,556	
1995	1,620	
1996	1,562	
1997	1,504	
1998	1,844	
1999	1,377	
2000	951	
2001	940	
2002	1,008	
2003	863	
2004	1,082	
2005	1,329	
2006	1,600	
2007	1,727	
2008	1,918	
2009	1,717	
2010	1,477	
2011	1,155	
2012	1,551	
2013	1,649	
2014	1,718	

== Surrounding area ==
The station serves the maintenance facilities of Haneda Airport and is mainly used by airline and support industry workers. It is located adjacent to the JAL Maintenance Center, which houses the JAL Sky Museum and the Safety Promotion Center, and is within walking distance of the ANA Maintenance Center which is also used for public tours.

== See also ==
- List of railway stations in Japan
