= My Papa's Persimmon Tree =

Picture book by Machiko Taniguchi

My Papa's Persimmon Tree (パパの柿の木, Papa no Kaki no Ki) is a children's picture book written by Machiko Taniguchi (谷口 真知子, Taniguchi Machiko), with illustrations by Kazuhiro Teishima (亭島 和洋, Teishima Kazuhiro), a friend of the writer. One Peace Books published the English version.

The author lives in Minoh, Osaka Prefecture. The author's husband, Masakatsu, died on board Japan Air Lines Flight 123 in 1985. He was the breadwinner of the family, which consisted of himself, his wife, and his two boys. Taniguchi obtained employment after her husband's death. He had planted a persimmon tree, and fruit began appearing from the tree two months after JAL123 occurred. Taniguchi wrote about this experience in the book. The book uses the point of view of the younger boy.

Taniguchi's granddaughter told Taniguchi, while she visited the site of JAL123 impact, that she wished to have interacted with Masakatsu. Taniguchi decided to create the book, with the statement by her granddaughter as having inspired her. The original Japanese version was published in 2016. The writer published the book herself.

A company suggested that an English version of the book should be made. The staff at Senri International School told Taniguchi that she should have an English version. Eight students at the senior high school level translated the book as part of their instructional time, with this project commencing in April 2019. The translation was done in four months. The English translation was released in July 2020. The English version has a letter addressed to Boeing, which manufactured the aircraft that was on the JAL123 accident flight.
