= Aircraft Accident Investigation Commission =

Former government agency of Japan

The Aircraft Accidents Investigation Commission (AAIC, 航空事故調査委員会 Kōkūjiko chōsa iinkai) was a government agency of Japan which investigated aviation accidents and incidents. It was subordinate to the Ministry of Transport, and after January 2001 the Ministry of Land, Infrastructure, Transport and Tourism (MLIT).

It was founded in 1974, following the All Nippon Airways Flight 58 Shizukuishi aircraft accident on July 30, 1971, and the Toa Domestic Airlines Flight 63 accident. On 1 October 2001 the agency was replaced by the Aircraft and Railway Accidents Investigation Commission (ARAIC). After a train accident occurred on the Tokyo Metro Hibiya Line on March 8, 2000, the former AAIC was restructured to ARAIC to also deal with railway accidents.

== Investigations ==
- China Airlines Flight 140
- Garuda Indonesia Flight 865
- Japan Air Lines Flight 123
- Japan Air Lines Flight 350
- Japan Air System Flight 451

== See also ==
- Japan Civil Aviation Bureau
