= Japan Civil Aviation Bureau =

Japanese civil aviation authority

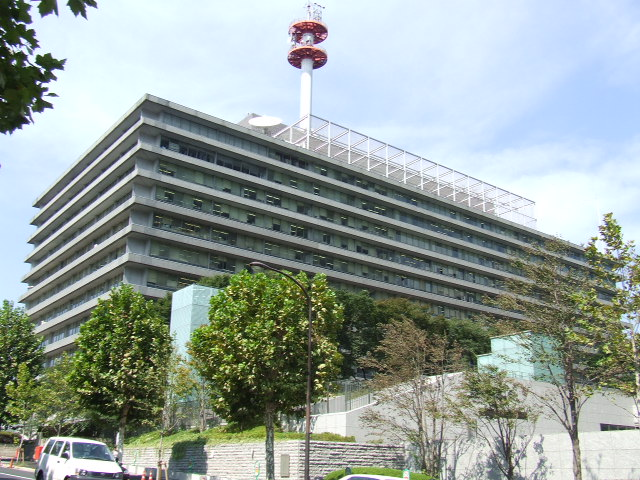
Offices of the Ministry of Land, Infrastructure, Transport and Tourism, which house the CAB

The Japan Civil Aviation Bureau (航空局, Kōkūkyoku; JCAB) is the civil aviation authority of Japan and a division of the Ministry of Land, Infrastructure, Transport and Tourism (MLIT). Its head office is in the MLIT building in Kasumigaseki, Chiyoda, Tokyo. It is the Japanese equivalent of the U.S. Federal Aviation Administration.

== Aircraft ==
The JCAB operates or has operated the following aircraft:

Jet

- Bombardier Global Express
- Cessna Citation CJ4 (525C model) - five in service for calibration duties as of June 2022.
- Cessna Citation Longitude - one, equipped for calibration of ground-based navigation and landing systems, received in June 2022, to replace the Dash 8.
- Gulfstream IV

Turboprop

- de Havilland Canada DHC-8-300 Dash 8
- NAMC YS-11
- Saab 2000

Helicopter

- Bell 412EP

== See also ==
- Japan Transport Safety Board (current accident investigation agency)
- Aircraft and Railway Accidents Investigation Commission (predecessor air and rail accident investigation agency)
- Aircraft Accident Investigation Commission (predecessor air accident investigation agency)
