= Diana Yukawa =

Japanese and British violinist and composer (born 1985)

Diana Yukawa ダイアナ湯川
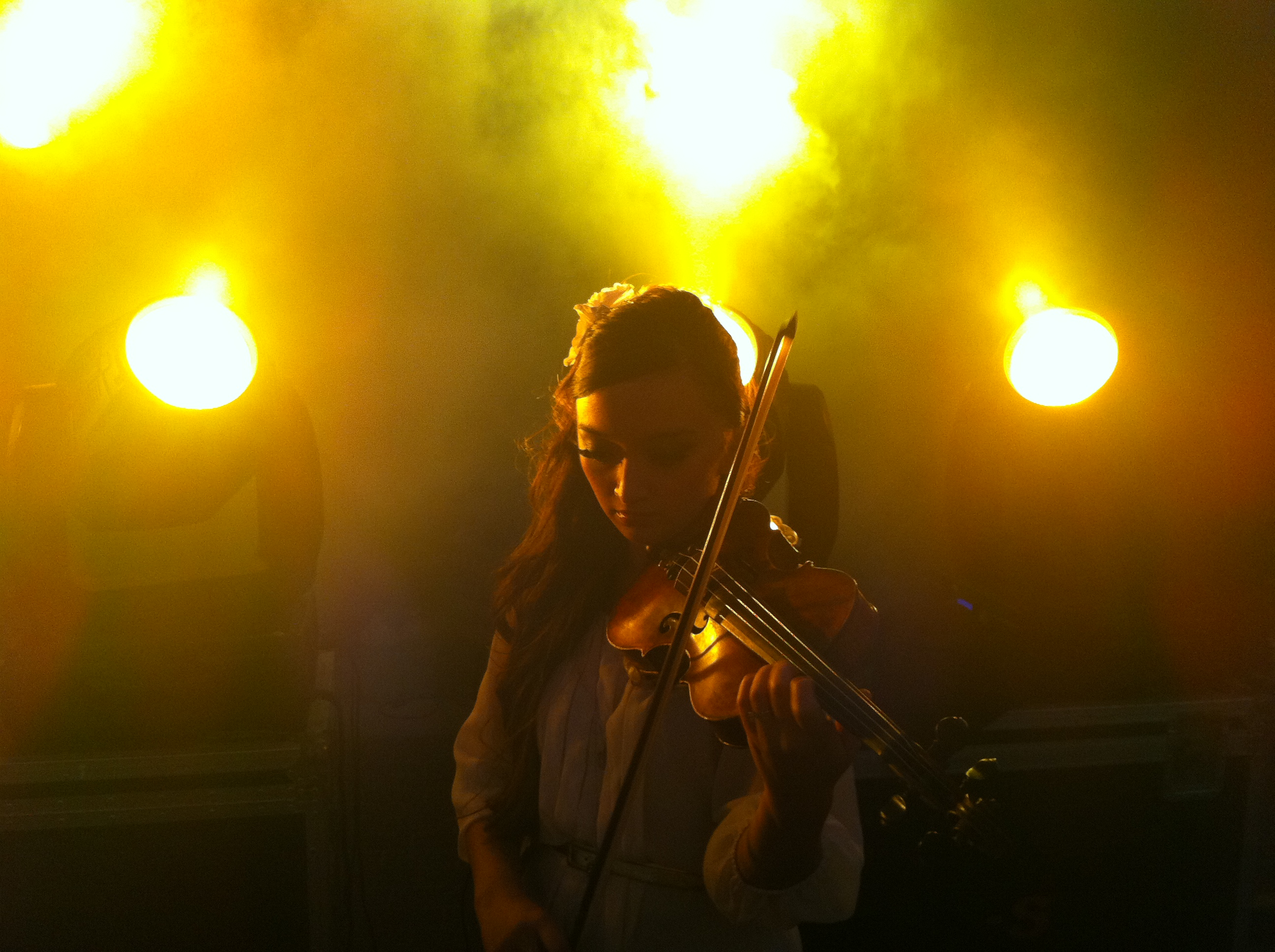

Background information
- Born: 16 September 1985 (age 41); Tokyo, Japan
- Genres: Modern, electronic, classical/crossover
- Occupations: Violinist, composer
- Labels: Sony, Longbody
- Website: dianayukawa.com

Diana Yukawa (ダイアナ湯川, Daiana Yukawa) (born 16 September 1985) is a Japanese and British violinist and composer. She has released four solo albums and one digital EP.

== Personal life ==
Yukawa was born in Tokyo, Japan, to Japanese banker Akihisa Yukawa and English ballet dancer Susanne Bayly. Her father died one month before she was born; he was killed in the crash of Japan Air Lines Flight 123 while travelling from Tokyo to Osaka. Yukawa has lived in the United Kingdom since she was 2 months old and began learning the violin when she was 5 years old.

Because Diana was born after her father's death, his name was excluded from her British birth certificate until the High Court of England in March 2000 ruled that, under the laws of England and Wales, Diana and her pianist sister Cassie were also in the eyes of the law Akihisa's offspring. The certificate was amended to include the name in June 2009.

Yukawa's brother-in-law is the actor Simon McBurney.

== Career ==
Yukawa has performed solo at The Royal Albert Hall, Hollywood Bowl, Wilderness Festival, Latitude Festival, St James Piccadilly, Cadogan Hall, the Khalifa Stadium in Qatar, and at the 2012 New Year concert at Burj in Dubai. She has supported Katherine Jenkins at Cheltenham Racecourse, the Tivoli Festival, the Place Des Arts in Montreal for Vincero. She also opened Jam Dubai and the FINA world swimming championship in Dubai. She headlined at Kenwood House Picnic Concerts on 7 August and performed music from Halo at the Video Game Awards 2010.

Yukawa has collaborated with Nitin Sawhney, Jeff Beck, Paul Oakenfold, Japanese group Deen, Craig Armstrong and appeared on various PBS shows.

Yukawa played during a memorial service for the Japan Air Lines Flight 123 victims on 12 August 2009. The service included playing a piece of music she had composed for her father.

In 2015 Yukawa began collaborating with electronic artists John Foxx and Benge in a musical group named Ghost Harmonic.

== Discography ==
Solo

- Elegy (AKA La Campanella) (September 2000); reached No. 1 in Japan
- Concerto (August 2001)
- The Butterfly Effect (October 2009)
- Finding the Parallel (EP) (March 2013)
- Spaces Between Shadows (February 2016)
- Spirals (September 2022)

with Ghost Harmonic

- Codex (25 May 2015)

== In popular culture ==
The title of an article on Yukawa in Japan Today in 2009, "Violinist linked to JAL crash blossoms", gave rise to the term "crash blossoms" for ambiguous headlines.
