= Safety Promotion Center =

Airplane safety exhibit in Tokyo, Japan

Coordinates: 35°32′32″N 139°47′20″E

The Japan Airlines Safety Promotion Center (日本航空安全啓発センター, Nihon Kōkū Anzai Keihatsu Sentā) is a museum and educational center operated by Japan Airlines to promote airline safety. It is located on the grounds of Tokyo International Airport in Ota, Tokyo, Japan. The center estimates that its facility is within two minutes walking distance from the Tokyo Monorail Shin Seibijō Station.

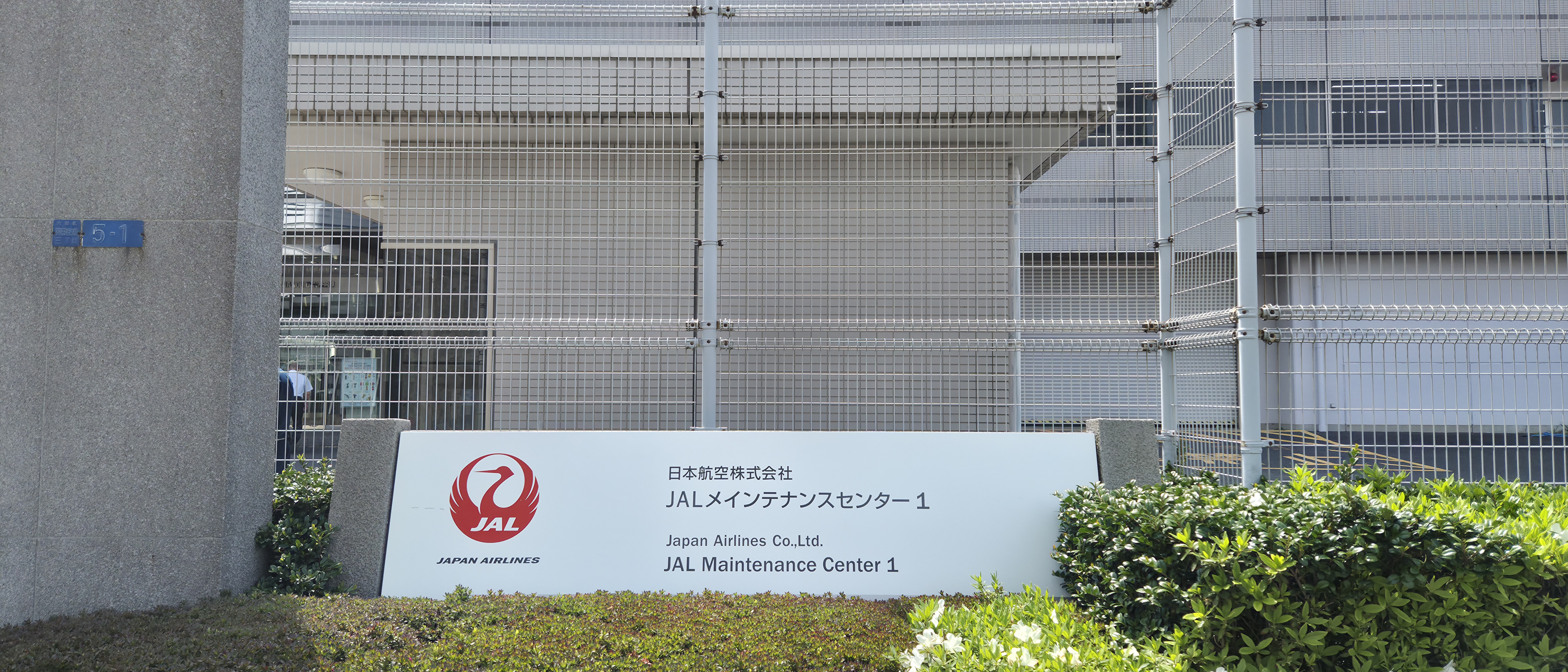
JAL Maintenance Center 1 houses the Safety Promotion Center

A major objective of the Safety Promotion Center is to establish safety awareness among JAL Group staff. The main exhibits of the center explain the events leading to the crash of Japan Air Lines Flight 123 in 1985, which used a Boeing 747.

== History ==
In 1985, Japan Air Lines Flight 123, a flight from Tokyo International Airport (informally called Haneda Airport) to Osaka International Airport (also known as Itami Airport), crashed into Mount Takamagahara. The accident was the deadliest involving a single aircraft. The crash was eventually attributed to an improper repair in the rear bulkhead seven years earlier, leading to catastrophic structural failure.

A five-member panel of external safety experts was established by Japan Airlines in 2005, the 20th anniversary of the crash of JAL 123, to brainstorm ideas to prevent future air disasters. Chaired by Kunio Yanagida, a well-known writer specializing in scientific, aviation, and crisis management topics, the panel recommended the creation of the center.

The center opened in 2006. Yutaka Kanasaki was the founding director. One of the main objectives of the center is to establish safety awareness among Japan Airlines employees. As a result, all new JAL employees, regardless of their position, are required to attend a tour of the center as part of their employment, as well as visit the crash site at Osutaka Ridge. In 2013, the center moved from its original location on the second floor of the Daini Sogo Building (第二綜合ビル, Daini Sōgō Biru) near Seibijō Station to its current location beside Shin Seibijō Station.

== Access ==
The center is located in the JAL Maintenance Center 1 near Haneda Airport, reachable by the Shin Seibijō Station on the Tokyo Monorail Haneda Airport Line. It is open to the public, but reservations are necessary.

== Exhibits ==
Wreckage from the aft fuselage, the cockpit voice recorder, newspaper reports of the accident, and photographs of the crash site are on display at the center. Owing to the amount of time the aircraft remained in the air after being crippled, a number of passengers chose to write farewell letters. Some of these letters are also on display. The center also has displays about other Japan Airlines accidents, as well as other historical aviation accidents. The center occupies 622 square meters (6,700 sq ft) of floor space.
