= Japan Transport Safety Board =

Japanese government commission

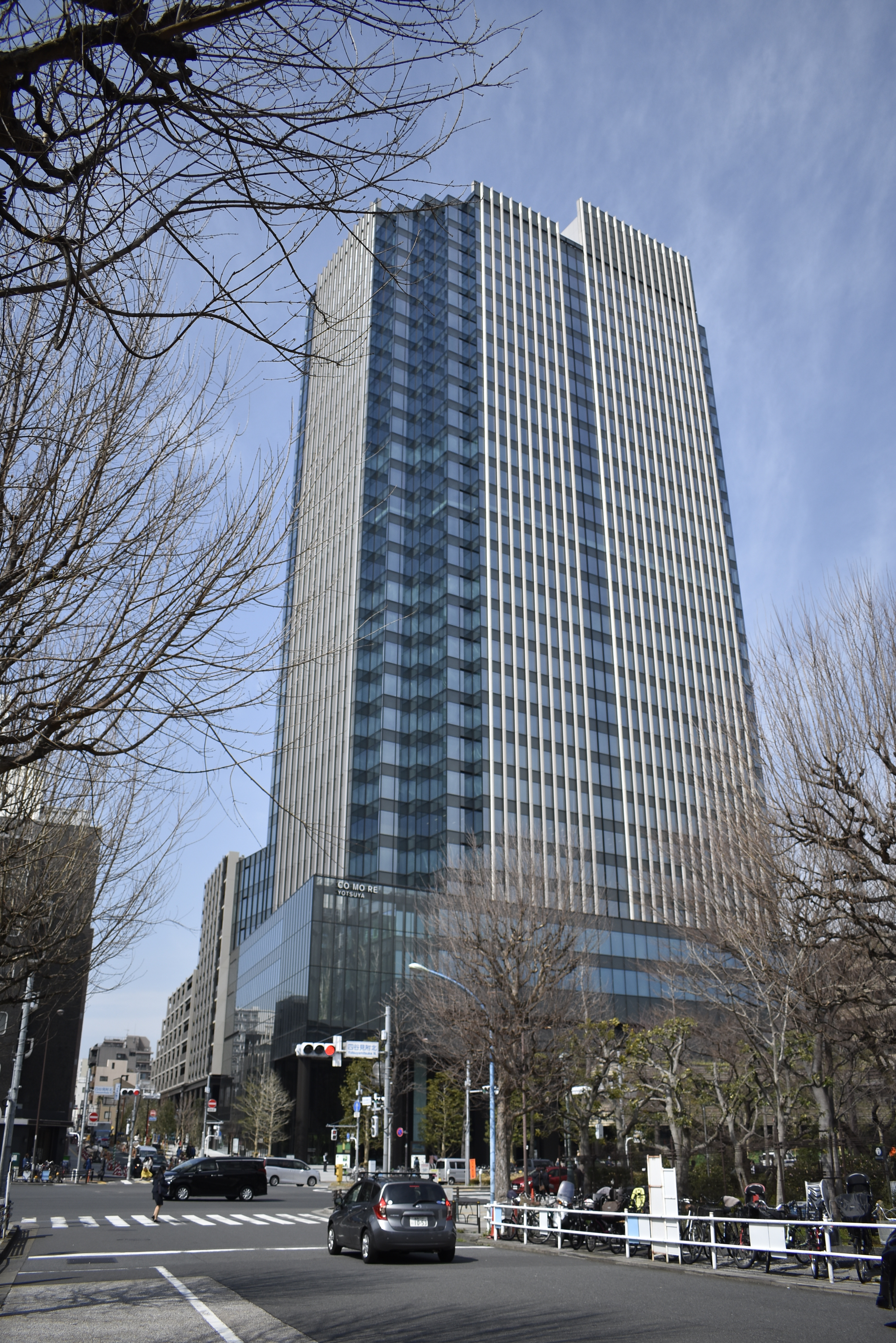
- Yotsuya Tower, where the agency has its headquarters

Agency overview
- Formed: 1 October 2008; 18 years ago
- Jurisdiction: Government of Japan
- Headquarters: 15th Floor, Yotsuya Tower, 1-6-1 Yotsuya, Shinjuku-ku, Tokyo (160-0004)
- Website: jtsb.mlit.go.jp

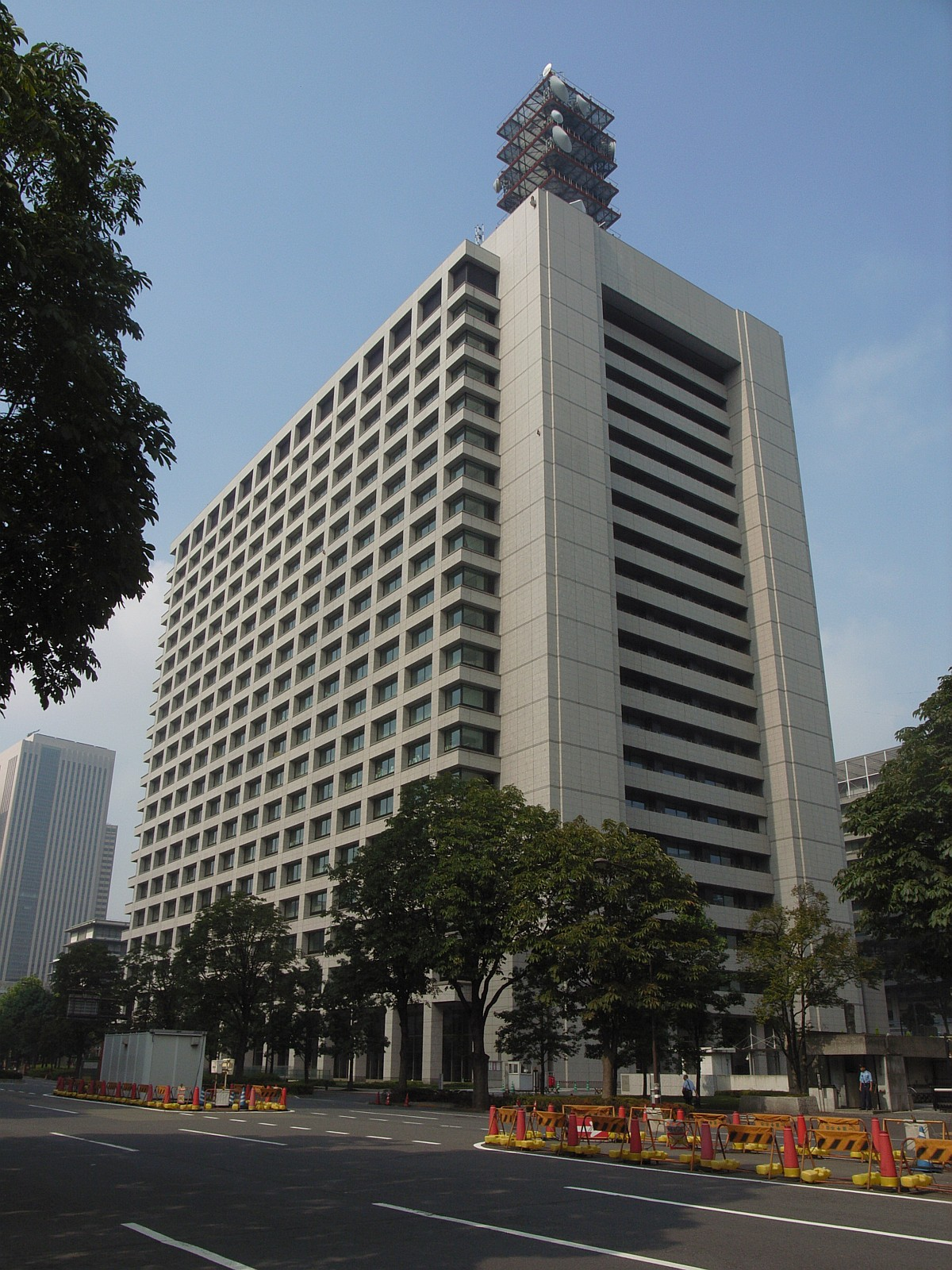
2nd Building of the Central Common Government Office, a building which housed the agency

The Japan Transport Safety Board (運輸安全委員会, Un'yu Anzen Iinkai; JTSB) is Japan's authority for establishing transportation safety (excluding related United States Forces Japan). It is a division of the Ministry of Land, Infrastructure, Transport and Tourism (MLIT).

The agency formed on 1 October 2008 as a merger between the Japan Marine Accident Inquiry Agency (JMAIA) and the Aircraft and Railway Accidents Investigation Commission (ARAIC).

As of 2020 the chairperson is Nobuo Takeda (武田 展雄, Takeda Nobuo).

== Administrative affairs ==
The headquarters is currently in the Yotsuya Tower (四谷タワー) in Yotsuya, Shinjuku, Tokyo.

The headquarters was previously in the 2nd Building of the Central Common Government Office in Kasumigaseki, Chiyoda, Tokyo.

== Logo ==
In March 2012, the JTSB adopted a logo. The sphere represents the desire to carry out investigations of accidents and to maintain independence and fairness. The lines around the sphere represent the air, land, and sea. The blue-green color of the sphere represents safety.

== Air accident investigations ==
- Japan Air Lines Flight 123
- China Airlines Flight 120
- FedEx Express Flight 80
- Asiana Airlines Flight 162
- Korean Air Flight 2708
- 2024 Haneda Airport runway collision

Other than that, responsible for investigating other non-United States Forces Japan accidents.

== See also ==
- Japan Civil Aviation Bureau
