= Aircraft and Railway Accidents Investigation Commission =

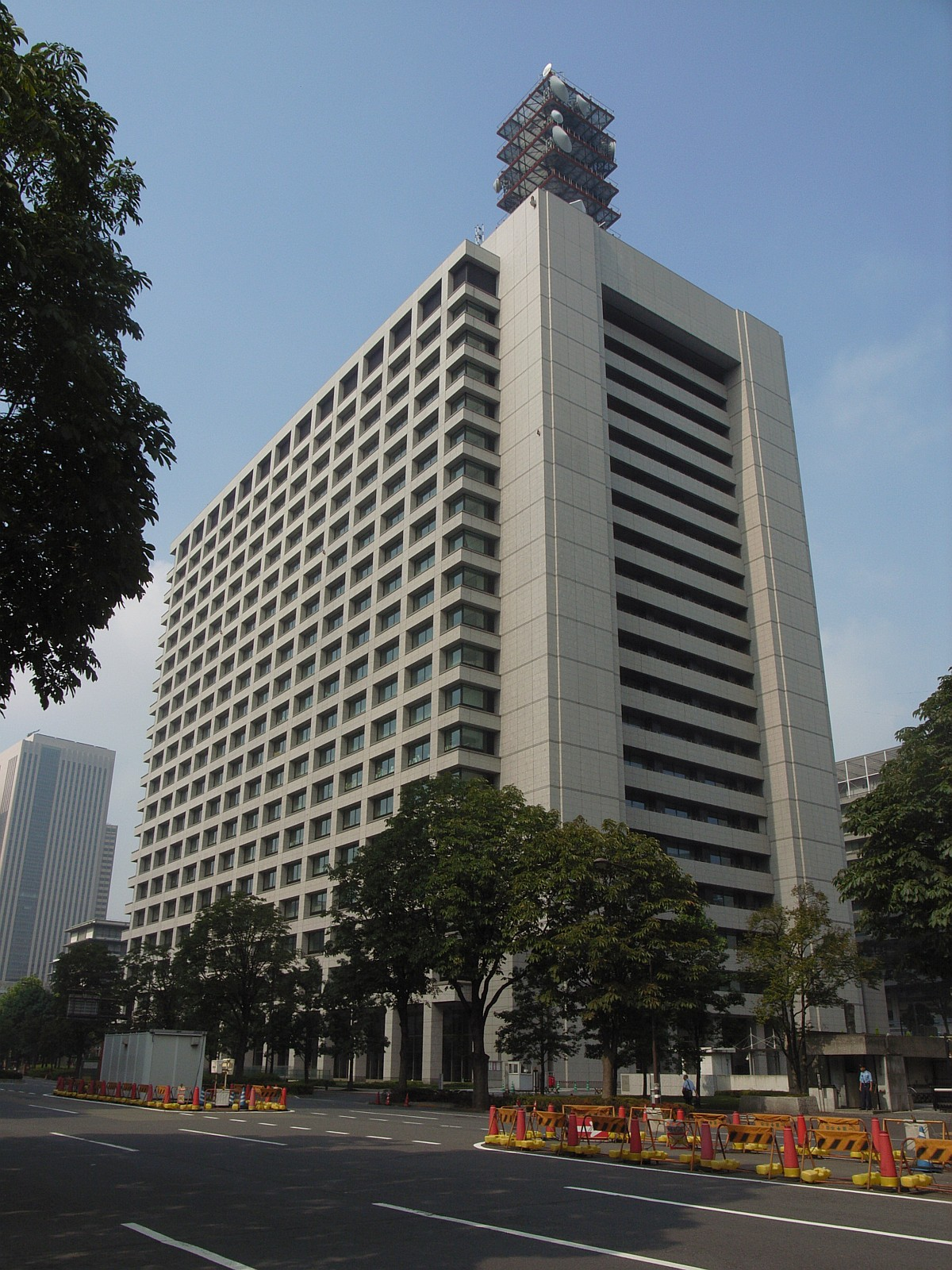
2nd Building of the Central Common Government Office, the building which housed the agency

The Aircraft and Railway Accidents Investigation Commission (ARAIC) (航空・鉄道事故調査委員会, Kōkū-tetsudōjiko chōsa iinkai) was a commission belonging to Japan's Ministry of Land, Infrastructure and Transport. Members of the commission were appointed by the transport minister to investigate the causes of aircraft and railway accidents and to make recommendations on improvements to prevent similar accidents. It was housed in the 2nd Building of the Central Common Government Office at 2-1-2 Kasumigasaeki in Chiyoda, Tokyo.

It was founded on October 1, 2001, replacing the Aircraft Accident Investigation Commission. After a train accident occurred on the Tokyo Metro Hibiya Line on March 8, 2000 the former AAIC was restructured to ARAIC to also deal with railway accidents.

The Japan Transport Safety Board began on October 1, 2008 as a merger between the Japan Marine Accident Inquiry Agency (JMAIA) and the ARAIC.

== Investigations ==
- 2001 Japan Airlines mid-air incident
- China Airlines Flight 120

== See also ==
- Japan Civil Aviation Bureau
