= Japan Air Lines Flight 123 =

1985 aviation accident in Japan

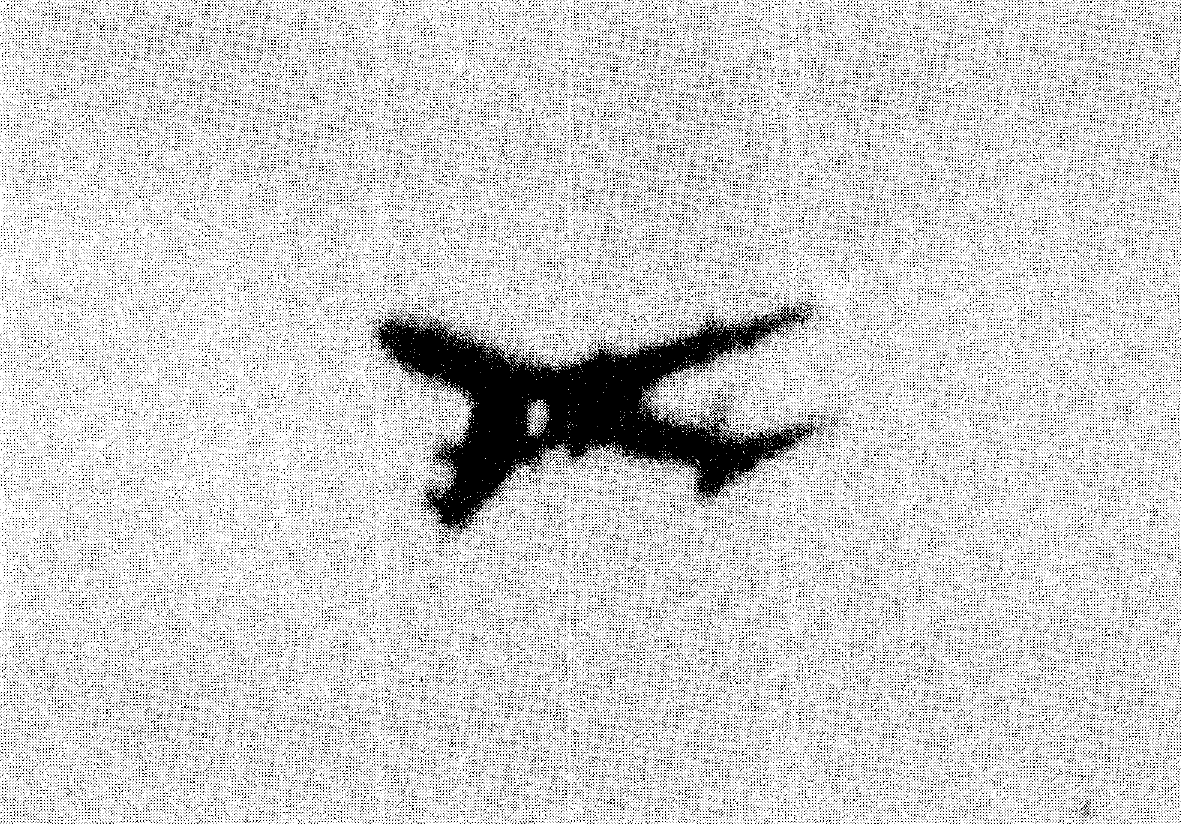
- The damaged 747 photographed over Okutama approximately six minutes before the crash; the vertical stabilizer is largely missing

Accident
- Date: August 12, 1985
- Summary: In-flight breakup due to improper maintenance leading to explosive decompression and loss of control
- Site: Mount Takamagahara, Ueno, Tano District, Gunma, Japan; 36°0′5″N 138°41′38″E

Aircraft
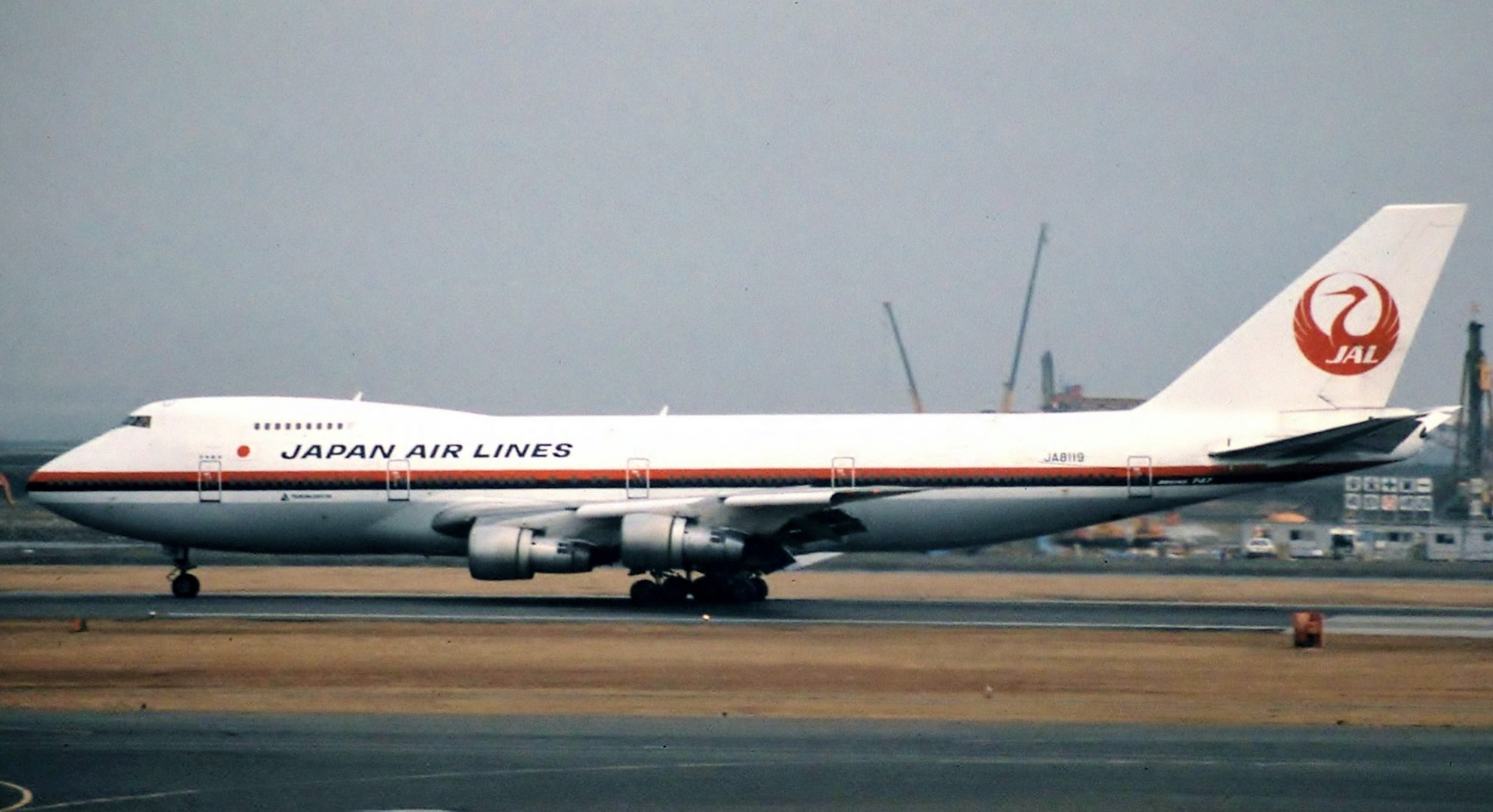
- JA8119, the aircraft involved in the accident, pictured in March 1985
- Aircraft type: Boeing 747SR-46 (Note: SR denotes that it was a short-range variant of the 747-100 with lower fuel capacity and greater payload capability; the 46 suffix is the Boeing customer code for Japan Airlines.)
- Operator: Japan Air Lines
- IATA flight No.: JL123
- ICAO flight No.: JAL123
- Call sign: JAPAN AIR 123
- Registration: JA8119
- Flight origin: Haneda Airport, Tokyo, Japan
- Destination: Itami Airport, Osaka, Japan
- Occupants: 524
- Passengers: 509
- Crew: 15
- Fatalities: 520
- Injuries: 4
- Survivors: 4

Japan Air Lines Flight 123 was a scheduled domestic passenger flight from Tokyo to Osaka, Japan. On the evening of Monday, August 12, 1985, the Boeing 747 flying the route suffered a severe structural failure and explosive decompression 12 minutes after takeoff. After flying under minimal control for 32 minutes, the plane crashed in the area of Mount Takamagahara, 100 kilometres (62 mi; 54 nmi) from Tokyo.

The aircraft, featuring a high-density seating configuration, was carrying 524 people. The initial crash killed all 15 crew members and 460–490 of the 509 passengers on board. An estimated 20 to 50 passengers survived the initial crash but died from their injuries while awaiting rescue, leaving only four survivors; 520 people died as a result of the crash. The crash is the deadliest single-aircraft accident in aviation history, and it remains the deadliest aviation incident in Japan.

Japan's Aircraft Accident Investigation Commission (AAIC), assisted by the U.S. National Transportation Safety Board, concluded that the structural failure was caused by a faulty repair by Boeing technicians following a tailstrike seven years earlier. When the faulty repair eventually failed, it resulted in a rapid decompression that ripped off a large portion of the tail and caused the loss of all hydraulic systems and flight controls.

== Background ==
=== Aircraft ===
The Boeing 747SR-46 with registration JA8119 was built and delivered to Japan Air Lines in 1974. It had accumulated slightly more than 25,000 flight hours and 18,800 cycles (one cycle consisting of takeoff, cabin pressurization, depressurization, and landing).

==== 1978 tailstrike incident ====
On June 2, 1978, while operating Japan Air Lines Flight 115 along the same route, JA8119 bounced heavily on landing while carrying out an instrument approach to runway 32L at Itami Airport. The pilot then excessively flared the aircraft, causing a severe tailstrike on the second touchdown. The tailstrike cracked open the aft pressure bulkhead, and 25 of the 394 people on board were injured. The damage was repaired by Boeing technicians, and the aircraft was returned to service. The aircraft had flown for an additional 8,830 hours between the completion of bulkhead repairs and the crash.

=== Crew ===
At the time of the accident, the aircraft was on the fifth of its six planned flights of the day. The flight had 15 crew members, consisting of three cockpit crew and 12 cabin crew.

The cockpit crew consisted of:

- Captain Masami Takahama (高浜 雅己, Takahama Masami), aged 49, served as a training instructor for First Officer Yutaka Sasaki on the flight, supervising him while handling the radio communications. Takahama was a veteran pilot, having logged about 12,424 flight hours, including about 4,842 hours in 747s.
- First Officer Yutaka Sasaki (佐々木 祐, Sasaki Yutaka), age 39, was the pilot flying and was undergoing training for promotion to captain, and flew Flight 123 as one of his final training and evaluation flights. He had logged about 3,963 flight hours, including about 2,665 hours in 747s.
- Flight Engineer Hiroshi Fukuda (福田 博, Fukuda Hiroshi), age 46, was a veteran flight engineer having logged about 9,831 flight hours, including about 3,846 hours in 747s.

In 1987, when the investigation concluded, all three cockpit crew members were posthumously awarded the Polaris Award.

=== Passengers ===
Seat plan for Flight 123, showing the seat locations of the four survivors

The flight was during the Obon holiday period when many Japanese people travel to their hometowns or to resorts. Twenty-two non-Japanese were on board the flight, including four residents of Hong Kong, two from Italy and six from the United States, and one each from West Germany and the United Kingdom. Some apparent foreigners had dual nationality, and some of them were residents of Japan.

The four survivors, all Japanese women, were seated on the left side and toward the middle of seat rows 54–60, in the rear of the aircraft. They were Yumi Ochiai, a Japan Air Lines off-duty flight attendant; Hiroko and Mikiko Yoshizaki, a mother and her 8-year-old daughter whose relatives died in the crash; and Keiko Kawakami, a 12-year-old girl whose parents and sister also died in the crash. Among the victims were Japanese singer and actor Kyu Sakamoto, and banker Akihisa Yukawa, the father-to-be of violinist and composer Diana Yukawa, born a month after the accident.

The flight connected two of the largest cities of Japan, and a number of other celebrities initially booked the flight but ultimately had either switched to another flight or used the Tokaido Shinkansen instead. These include Sanma Akashiya, Masataka Itsumi and his family, Johnny Kitagawa, and the then–cast of Shōten. Some members of the Shonentai were also scheduled to travel with Kitagawa but had stayed in Tokyo.

Nationality	Passengers	Crew	Survivors	Total
Japan	487	15	4	502
China	1	0	0	1
West Germany	2	0	0	2
British Hong Kong	4	0	0	4
India	3	0	0	3
Italy	2	0	0	2
South Korea	3	0	0	3
United Kingdom	1	0	0	1
United States	6	0	0	6
Total	509	15	4	524

== Accident ==
=== Take-off and decompression ===
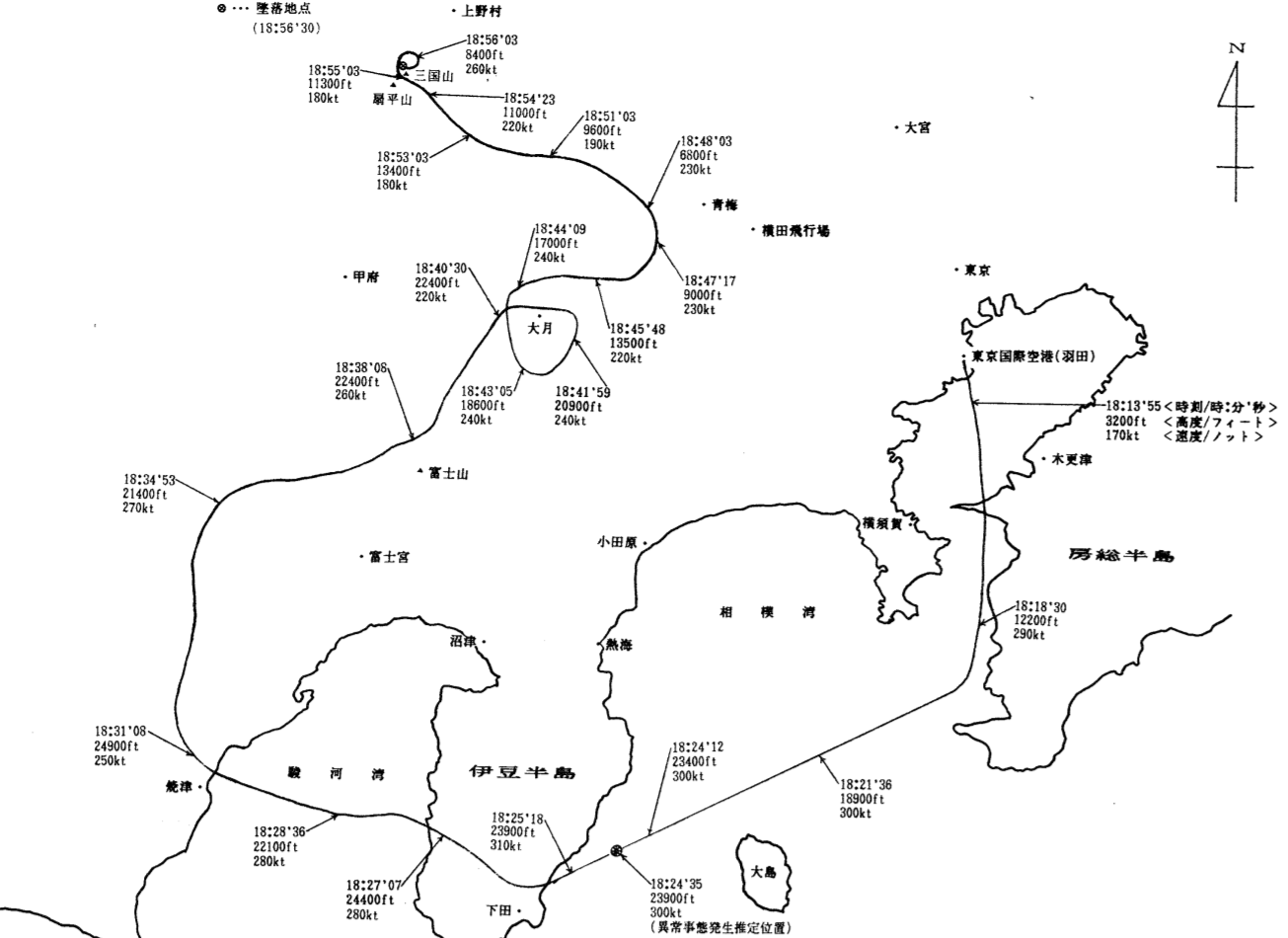
Route of Japan Air Lines Flight 123

The aircraft landed as JL366 at Haneda Airport in Ōta, Tokyo, from Fukuoka Airport at 17:12. After almost an hour on the ground, Flight 123 pushed back from gate 18 at 18:04 and took off from Runway 15L at 18:12, 12 minutes behind schedule. Twelve minutes after takeoff, at 18:24, at near cruising altitude over Sagami Bay 3.5 miles (3.0 nmi; 5.6 km) east of Higashiizu, Shizuoka, the aircraft underwent explosive decompression, bringing down the ceiling around the rear lavatories, damaging the unpressurised fuselage aft of the plane, unseating the vertical stabilizer, and severing all four hydraulic lines. A photograph taken from the ground shows the vertical stabilizer missing.

Vertical stabilizer decompression and separation sequence (in Japanese)

The pilots set their transponder to broadcast a distress signal. Captain Takahama contacted Tokyo Area Control Center to declare an emergency and request a return to Haneda Airport, descending and following emergency landing vectors to Oshima. Tokyo Control approved a right-hand turn to a heading of 090° back toward Oshima, and the aircraft entered an initial right-hand bank of 040°, several degrees greater than observed previously. Captain Takahama ordered First Officer Sasaki to reduce the bank angle, and expressed confusion when the aircraft did not respond to the control wheel being turned left. The flight engineer reported that hydraulic pressure was dropping. The captain repeated the order to reduce the bank angle, as the autopilot had disengaged. He ordered the first officer to bank it back, then ordered him to pull up. None of these attempted maneuvers produced a response. The pilots realised the aircraft had become virtually uncontrollable, and Captain Takahama ordered the copilot to descend.

=== 18:27–18:34 ===
Heading over the Izu Peninsula at 18:26, the aircraft turned away from the Pacific Ocean and back toward the shore, but only turned right far enough to fly a north-westerly course. Seeing that the aircraft was still flying west away from Haneda, Tokyo Control contacted the aircraft again. After confirming that the pilots were declaring an emergency, the controller asked the nature of the emergency. At this point, hypoxia appeared to have begun setting in, as the pilots did not respond. Also, the captain and co-pilot asked the flight engineer repeatedly if hydraulic pressure had been lost, seemingly unable to comprehend it. Tokyo Control contacted the aircraft again and repeated the direction to descend and turn to a 090° heading to Oshima. Only then did the captain report that the aircraft had become uncontrollable. (Tokyo: "Japan Air 124 [sic] fly heading 090 radar vector to Oshima." JAL123: "But now uncontrol." Tokyo: "Uncontrol, roger understood.")

The aircraft traversed Suruga Bay and passed over Yaizu, Shizuoka, at 18:31:02. Tokyo Control asked if they could descend, and Captain Takahama replied that they were now descending, stating that their altitude was 24,000 feet (7,300 m). Captain Takahama declined Tokyo Control's suggestion to divert to Nagoya Airport 72 nautical miles (83 mi; 133 km) away, instead preferring to land at Haneda, which had the facilities to handle the 747. The flight data recorder shows that the flight did not descend, but was rising and falling uncontrollably. With the total loss of hydraulic control and non-functional control surfaces, the aircraft entered phugoid oscillations lasting about 90 seconds, in which airspeed decreased as it climbed and increased as it fell. The rise in airspeed increased the lift over the wings, resulting in the aircraft climbing and slowing down, then descending and gaining speed again. Almost immediately after the separation of the stabiliser and rudder removed the only means of damping yaw, the aircraft began to exhibit Dutch roll, simultaneously yawing right and banking left, before yawing back left and banking right. At some points the banking motion became very profound, with large arcs of around 50° in cycles of 12 seconds.

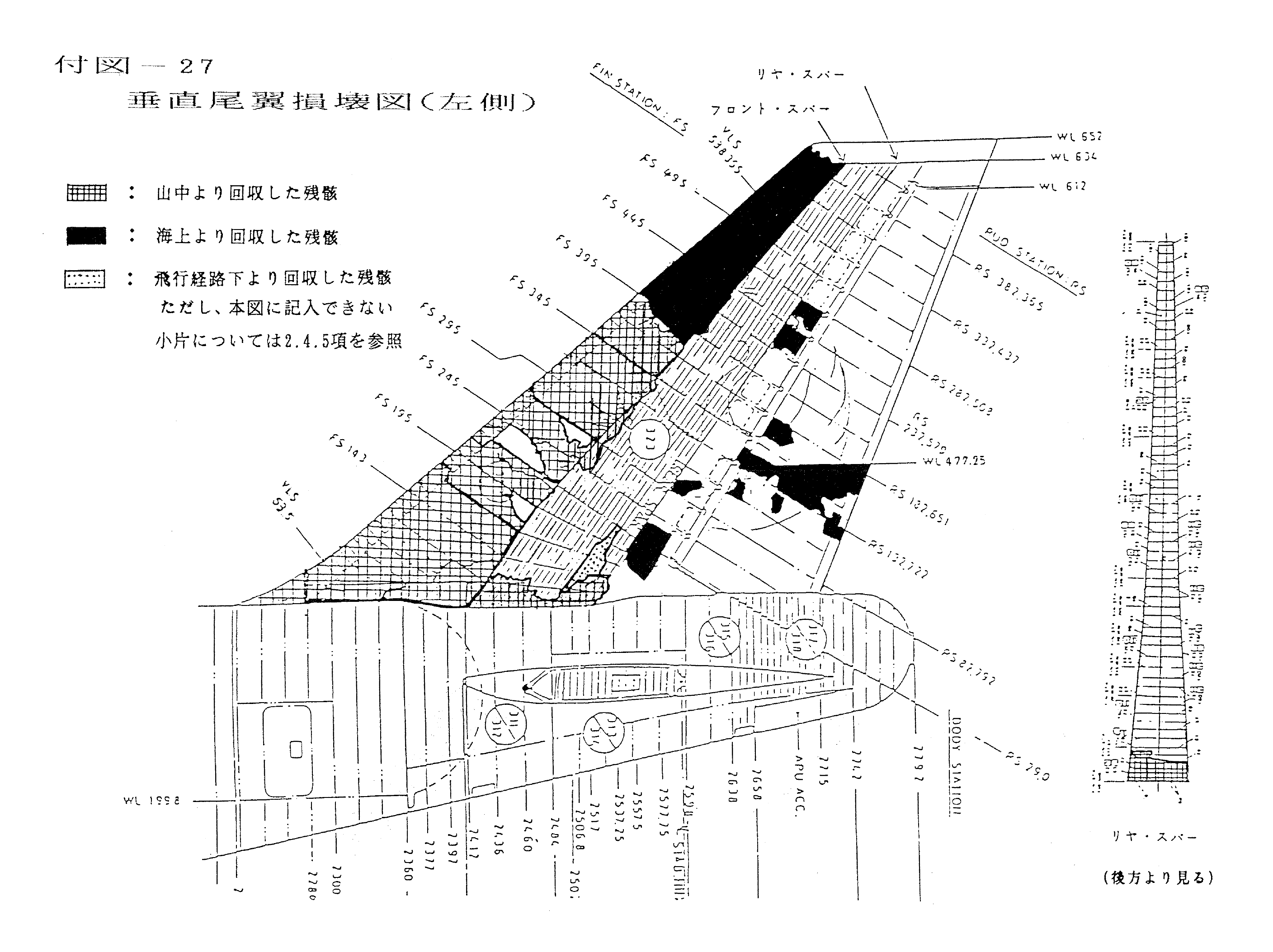
Diagram of the damage to the vertical stabilizer on the left side

Despite the complete loss of control, the pilots continued to turn the control wheel, pull on the control column, and move the rudder pedals until the moment of the crash. The pilots also began efforts to establish control using differential engine thrust, as the aircraft slowly wandered back toward Haneda. Their efforts had limited success. The unpressurised aircraft rose and fell in an altitude range of 20,000–25,000 feet (6,100–7,600 m) for 18 minutes, from the moment of decompression until around 6:40 p.m., with the pilots seemingly unable to figure out how to descend without flight controls. This was possibly due to the effects of hypoxia at such altitudes, as the pilots seemed to have difficulty comprehending their situation as the aircraft pitched and rolled uncontrollably. The pilots possibly were focused, instead, on the cause of the explosion they had heard, and the subsequent difficulty in controlling the jet. The flight engineer suggested donning oxygen masks when word reached the cockpit that the rear-most passenger masks had stopped working. None of the pilots complied, however, but the captain simply replied "yes" to both suggestions by the flight engineer to do so. The accident report indicates that the captain's disregard of the suggestion is one of several features "regarded as hypoxia-related in [the] CVR record[ing]." Their voices can be heard relatively clearly on the cockpit area microphone for the entire duration, until the crash, indicating that they never donned their oxygen masks.

=== 18:34–18:48: Limited control ===
Flight 123 audio transcript
- Flight 123 CVR and ATC transcript in English with map of flight on YouTube

At 18:35, the flight engineer responded for the first time to multiple calls from Japan Air Tokyo via the SELCAL (selective-calling) system. Having just been informed about the inoperative oxygen masks, the flight engineer voiced the (erroneous) assumption that the R-5 door was broken and informed the company that they were making an emergency descent. Japan Air Tokyo asked if they intended to return to Haneda, to which the flight engineer responded that they were making an emergency descent, and to continue to monitor them.

Eventually, the pilots regained limited control of the aircraft by adjusting engine thrust. In doing so, they dampened the phugoid cycle and somewhat stabilized their altitude. However, given jet engines' inertia and the resulting response time (to changes in throttle), "[s]uppressing of Dutch roll mode by use of the differential thrust between the right and left engines is estimated practically impossible for a pilot." Shortly after 6:40 p.m., they lowered the landing gear using the emergency extension system in an attempt to dampen the phugoid cycles and Dutch rolls further. This was somewhat successful, as the phugoid cycles were dampened almost completely, and the Dutch roll was damped significantly, but lowering the gear also decreased the directional control the pilots were getting by applying power to one side of the aircraft, and their ability to control the aircraft deteriorated.

Shortly after lowering the gear, the flight engineer asked if the speed brakes should be used, but the pilots did not acknowledge the request. The aircraft then began a right-hand descending 420° turn from a heading of 040° at 6:40 p.m. to a heading of 100° at 18:45, flying in a loop over Otsuki, due to a thrust imbalance created from having the power setting on Engine 1 (the left-most engine) higher than the other three engines. The aircraft also began descending from 22,400 feet (6,800 m) to 17,000 feet (5,200 m), as the pilots had reduced engine thrust to near idle from 18:43 - 18:48. Upon descending to 13,500 feet (4,100 m) at 18:45:46, the pilots again reported an uncontrollable aircraft. At this time, the aircraft began turning slowly to the left, while continuing to descend. The thicker air allowed the pilots more oxygen, and their hypoxia appeared to have subsided somewhat, as they were communicating more frequently. The pilots also appeared to understand the gravity of their situation, with Captain Takahama exclaiming, "This may be hopeless" at 18:46:33. At 18:47, the pilots recognised that they were beginning to turn toward the mountains. Despite efforts by the crew to get the aircraft to continue to turn right, it instead turned left, flying directly toward the mountainous terrain on a westerly heading.

Around 18:50 – approximately six minutes before the aircraft crashed – a photographer on the ground in Okutama captured a photograph of the 747, which showed that the vertical stabiliser was missing.

=== 18:48–18:55: Final loss of control ===
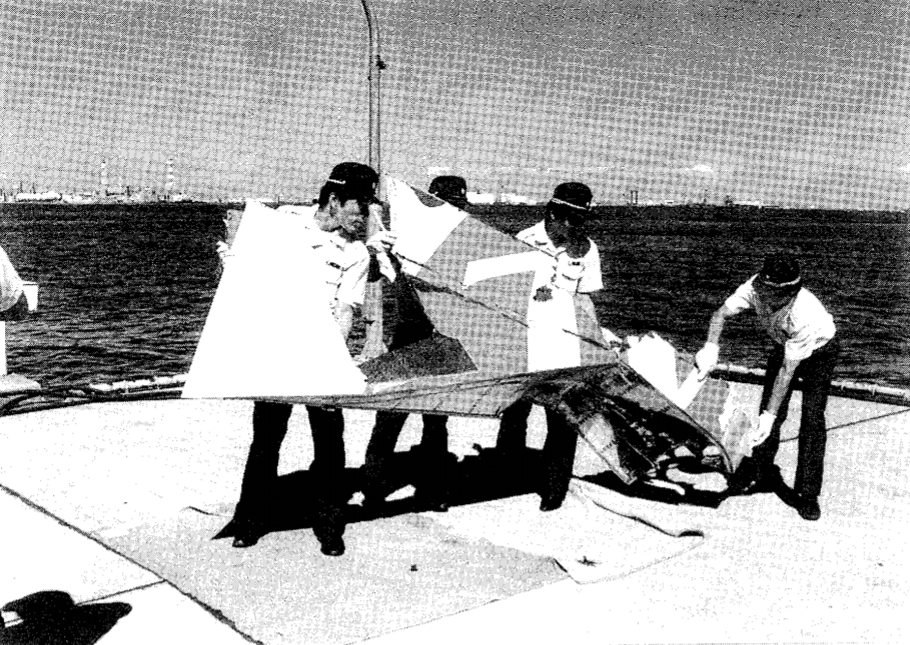
Parts of the vertical tail fin being recovered from the sea

As the aircraft continued west, it descended below 7,000 feet (2,100 m) and was getting dangerously close to the mountains. Because of the thicker air at lower altitude, the cabin altitude alert momentarily turned off at this time, before resuming for the rest of the flight. The captain briefly ordered maximum engine power to attempt to get the aircraft to climb to avoid the mountains, and engine power was added abruptly at 18:48, before being reduced back to near idle; then at 18:49, it was ordered raised again. This greatly excited the phugoid motion, and the aircraft pitched up, before pitching back down after power was reduced. When power was added again, the aircraft rapidly pitched up to 40°, and the airspeed dropped down to 108 knots (200 km/h; 124 mph) at 18:49:30, briefly stalling at 9,000 feet (2,700 m). The captain immediately ordered maximum power at 18:49:40 as the stick shaker sounded. The aircraft's airspeed increased as it was brought into an unsteady climb. Possibly in order to prevent another stall, at 6:51 p.m., the captain lowered the flaps to 5 units—due to the lack of hydraulics, using an alternate electrical system—in an additional attempt to exert control over the stricken jet. It took 3 minutes and 10 seconds for the trailing edge flaps to reach 5 units. The leading edge flaps except for the left and right outer groups were also extended and the extension was completed at 18:52:39 From 18:49:03 to 18:52:11, Japan Air Tokyo attempted to call the aircraft again via the SELCAL radio system. During the entire period, the SELCAL alarm continued to ring, but the pilots did not react to it.

The aircraft reached 13,000 feet (4,000 m) at 6:53 p.m., when the captain reported an uncontrollable aircraft for the third time. Shortly afterward, the controller asked the crew to switch the radio frequency to 119.7 for Tokyo Approach; the pilots complied but did not acknowledge the request. Tokyo Approach then contacted the flight via the SELCAL system, briefly activating the corresponding alarm again until the flight engineer responded. At this point, the flight crew requested their position, which, at 18:54, was reported as 45 nmi (83 km) northwest of Haneda, and 25 nmi (46 km) west of Kumagaya. At 18:55, the captain requested flap extension, and the co-pilot called out a flap extension to 10 units, but the flaps had already extended past 5 units at 18:54:30 and had reached 20 units 1 minute and 2 seconds later. Meanwhile, the aircraft had started banking abnormally toward the right; this might have been most likely due to an imbalance in the lift generated by the left and right flaps. Power was increased at the same time. While the flaps continued to extend, a differential thrust setting caused engine power on the left side to be slightly higher than on the right side, exacerbating the roll to the right.

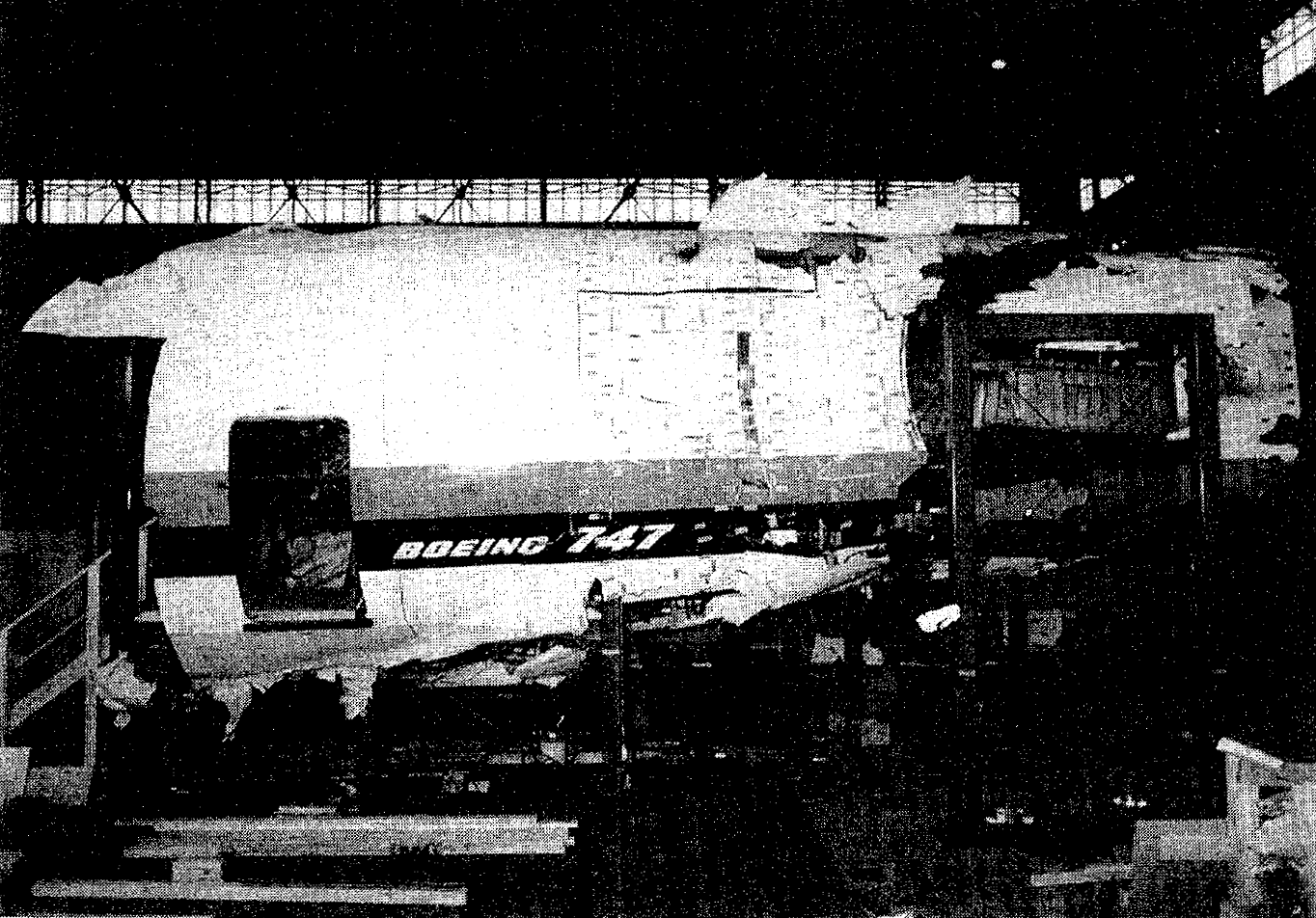
Reconstruction of the left side of the fuselage

One minute later, the flaps were extended to about 25 units, the bank angle exceeded 60°, and the nose began to drop. Captain Takahama immediately ordered the flaps to be retracted, and power was added abruptly, but still with higher power settings on the left engines than on the right. The asymmetric thrust settings continued to increase as the bank angle continued and exceeded 80°. The captain was heard on the CVR desperately asking that the flaps be retracted and that more power be applied in a last-ditch effort to raise the nose. The aircraft continued an unrecoverable right-hand descent toward the mountains as the bank angle recovered to about 70° and engines were pushed to full power, during which the ground proximity warning system sounded.

In the final moments, as the airspeed exceeded 340 knots (630 km/h; 390 mph), the pitch attitude leveled out and the aircraft ceased descending, with the aircraft and passengers/crew being subjected to 3 g of upward vertical acceleration.

=== 18:56:30: Crash ===
The aircraft was still in a 40° right-hand bank when the right wing clipped a ridge containing a "U-shaped ditch" 520 metres (1,710 ft) west-northwest of the previous ridge at an elevation of 1,610 metres (5,280 ft). It is speculated that this impact separated the outer third of the right wing, and two engines, which were "dispersed 500–700 metres (1,600–2,300 ft) ahead". After this impact, the aircraft flipped on its back, struck another ridge 570 metres (1,870 ft) northwest from the second ridge, near Mount Takamagahara, and exploded.

The impact registered on a seismometer located in the Shin-Etsu Earthquake Observatory at Tokyo University from 18:56:27, as a small shock, to 18:56:32 as a larger shock, believed to have been caused by the final crash. The shockwaves took an estimated 2.0–2.3 seconds to reach the seismometer, making the estimated time of the final crash 18:56:30. Thirty-two minutes had elapsed from the bulkhead failure to the crash.

=== Crash site ===
The aircraft crashed at an elevation of 1,565 metres (5,135 ft) in Sector 76, State Forest, 3577 Aza Hontani, Ouaza Narahara, Ueno Village, Tano District, Gunma Prefecture. The east–west ridge is about 2.5 kilometres (8,200 ft) north-northwest of Mount Mikuni. Ed Magnuson of Time magazine said that the area where the aircraft crashed was referred to as the "Tibet" of Gunma Prefecture.

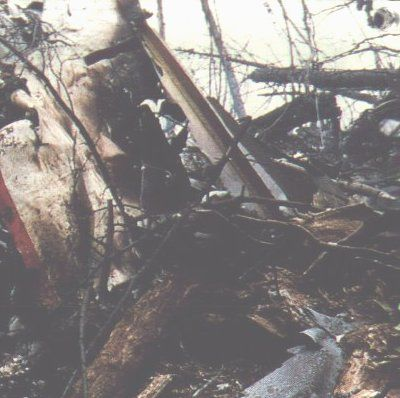
Wreckage at the crash site

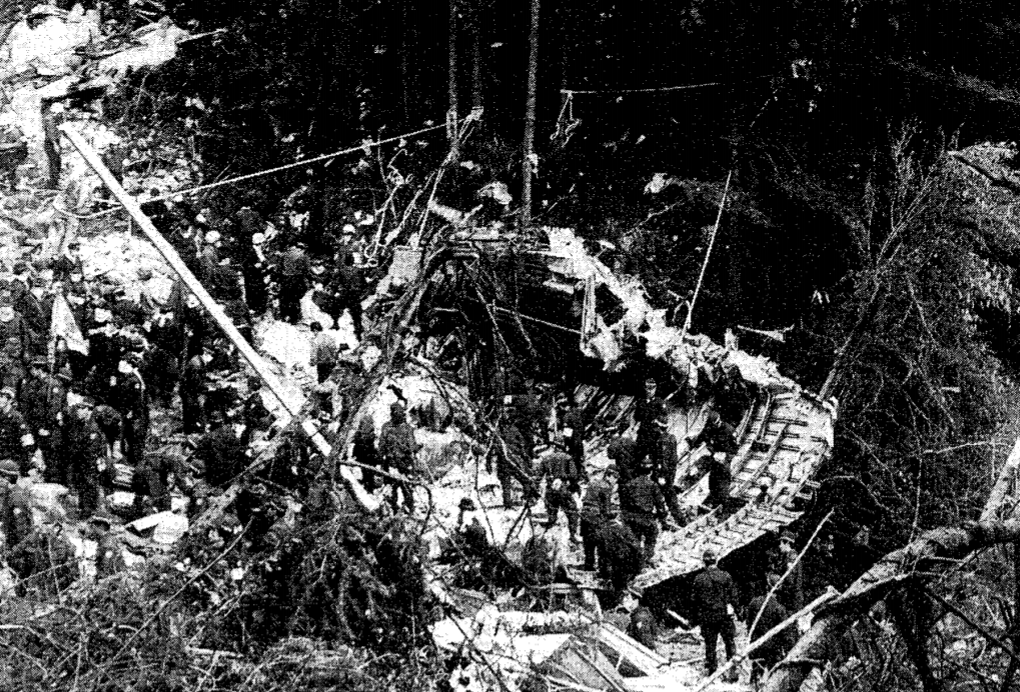
Rescuers at the crash site

== Delayed rescue operation ==
- Crash location
- Tokyo International Airport (origin)
- Osaka International Airport (destination)

A United States Air Force navigator stationed at Yokota Air Base published an account in 1995, stating that the U.S. military had monitored the distress calls and prepared a search-and-rescue operation that was aborted at the call of Japanese authorities. A U.S. Air Force C-130 crew was the first to spot the crash site 20 minutes after impact, before dusk, and radioed the location to the Japanese and Yokota Air Base, where an Iroquois helicopter was dispatched. An article in the Pacific Stars and Stripes from 1985 stated that personnel at Yokota were on standby to help with rescue operations, but were never called by the Japanese government.

A JSDF helicopter later spotted the wreck after nightfall. Poor visibility and the difficult mountainous terrain prevented it from landing at the site. The pilot reported from the air no signs of survivors. Based on this report, JSDF personnel on the ground did not set out to the site on the night of the crash. Instead, they were dispatched to spend the night at a makeshift village erecting tents, constructing helicopter landing ramps, and engaging in other preparations, 63 kilometres (39 miles) from the crash site. Rescue teams set out for the site the following morning. Medical staff later found bodies with injuries suggesting that people had survived the crash only to die from shock, exposure to low temperatures overnight in the mountains, or injuries that, if tended to earlier, would not have been fatal. One doctor said, "If the discovery had come 10 hours earlier, we could have found more survivors."

One of the four survivors, off-duty Japan Air Lines flight purser Yumi Ochiai (落合 由美, Ochiai Yumi) recounted from her hospital bed that she recalled bright lights and the sound of helicopter rotors shortly after she awoke amid the wreckage, and while she could hear screaming and moaning from other survivors, these sounds gradually died away during the night.

== Investigation ==
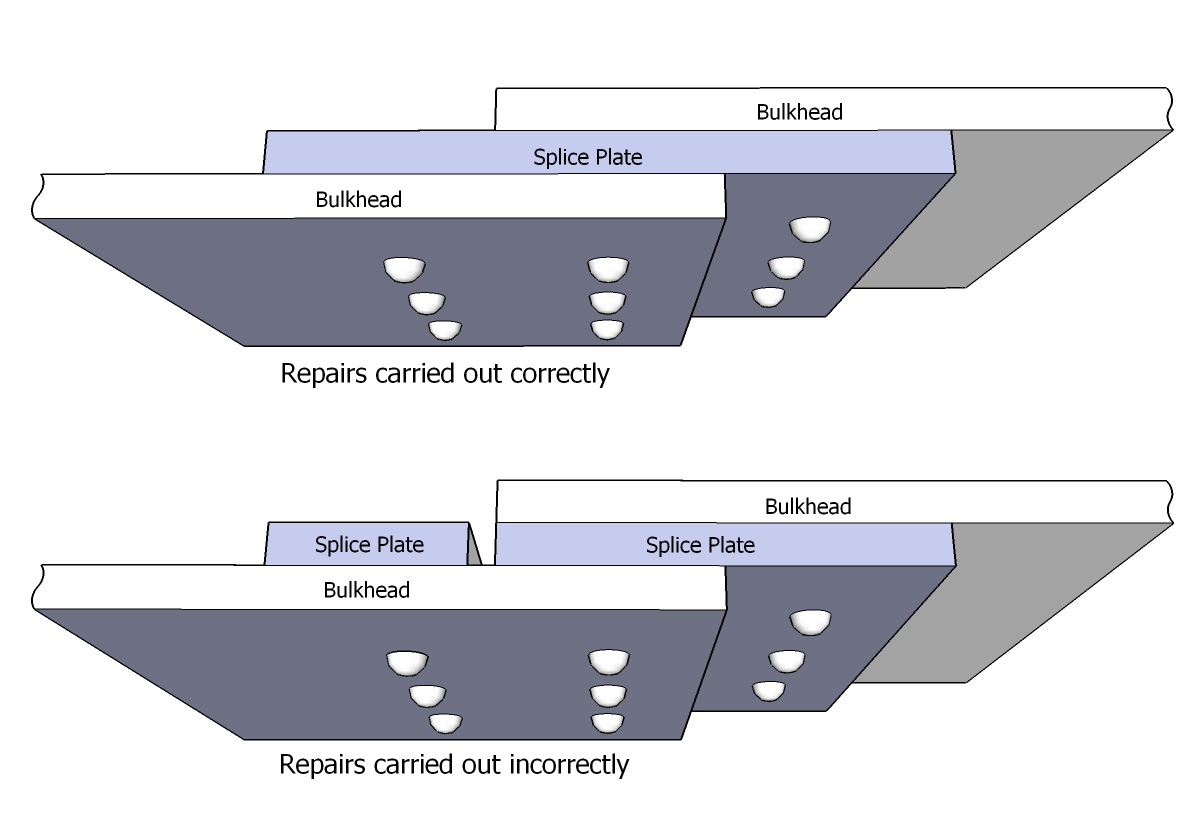
Correct (top) and incorrect (bottom) splice plate installations

A diagram of the aft pressure bulkhead on Flight 123

Japan's Aircraft Accident Investigation Commission published their final report on the accident on June 19, 1987. The official cause of the crash according to the investigation was:

- The aircraft was involved in a tailstrike incident at Osaka International Airport seven years earlier as JAL Flight 115, which damaged its aft pressure bulkhead.
- The subsequent repair of the bulkhead did not conform to Boeing's approved repair methods. For reinforcing a damaged bulkhead, Boeing's repair procedure calls for one continuous splice plate with three rows of rivets. The Boeing repair technicians, however, had used two splice plates parallel to the stress crack. Cutting the plate in this manner negated the effectiveness of the row of rivets, reducing the part's resistance to fatigue cracking to about 70% of that for a correct repair. The post-repair inspection by JAL did not discover the defect, as it was covered by overlapping plates. During the investigation, the Accident Investigation Commission calculated that this incorrect installation would fail after about 11,000 pressurization cycles; the aircraft accomplished 12,318 successful flights from the time the faulty repair was made to when the crash happened.

Consequently, after repeated pressurization cycles during normal flight, the bulkhead gradually began cracking near the row of rivets holding it together. When it finally failed, the resulting rapid decompression ruptured the lines of all four hydraulic systems and ejected the vertical stabiliser. With many of its flight controls disabled, the aircraft became uncontrollable.

In 2025, it was reported that, according to Hideji Kenjo, an officer with the Gunma Prefectural Police who worked on the case, the identification and autopsies of the victims was conducted in a gymnasium that had been converted into a morgue for the purposes of the investigation, and that the process lasted over a month from the date of the crash.

== Aftermath and legacy ==
The Japanese public's confidence in Japan Air Lines took a dramatic downturn in the wake of the disaster, with passenger numbers on domestic routes dropping by one-third. Rumors persisted that Boeing had admitted faults to cover up shortcomings in the airline's inspection procedures to protect the reputation of a major customer. In the months after the crash, domestic air traffic decreased by as much as 25%. In 1986, for the first time in a decade, fewer passengers boarded JAL's overseas flights during the New Year period than the previous year. Some of them considered switching to All Nippon Airways, JAL's main competitor, as a safer alternative.

In the aftermath of the incident, JAL president Yasumoto Takagi resigned. Hiroo Tominaga, a JAL maintenance manager, committed suicide intended to atone for the incident. Susumu Tajima, an engineer who had inspected and cleared the aircraft as flightworthy following the tailstrike incident, later also killed himself, leaving a suicide note that cited "work problems".

In 1989, a McDonnell Douglas DC-10 serving United Airlines Flight 232 experienced a similar total loss of hydraulic pressure after suffering an uncontained engine failure while flying over the Midwestern United States. United Airlines check pilot Dennis Fitch, who was aboard Flight 232 as a passenger, had studied the case of Japan Air Lines 123 and had practiced similar scenarios in a flight simulator. This experience enabled him to assist the flight crew in making a controlled crash landing at Sioux Gateway Airport in Sioux City, Iowa, directly contributing to the survival of 184 of the 296 people on board.

In 2009, stairs with a handrail were installed to facilitate visitors' access to the crash site. On August 12, 2010, for the 25th anniversary of the accident, Japan Land, Infrastructure, Transport, and Tourism Minister Seiji Maehara visited the site to remember the victims. Families of the victims, together with local volunteer groups, hold an annual memorial gathering every 12 August near the crash site in Gunma Prefecture.

The crash led to the 2006 opening of the Safety Promotion Center, which is located on the grounds of Haneda Airport. This center was created for training purposes to alert employees to the importance of airline safety and their responsibility to ensure it. The center has displays regarding aviation safety, the history of the crash, and selected pieces of the aircraft and passenger effects (including handwritten farewell notes). It is open to the public by appointment. In an effort to promote safety awareness within the airline, all new JAL employees, regardless of their position, are required to attend a tour of the center as part of their employment, as well as visit the crash site at Osutaka Ridge.

The captain's daughter, Yoko Takahama, a high-school student at the time of the crash, later became a JAL flight attendant.

In 2022, an oxygen mask belonging to Flight 123 was found near the crash site during road repair work; engine parts had been found nearby in 2021.

In 2024, the 39th anniversary day climb was joined by JAL's President and CEO Mitsuko Tottori, who began her career with the airline as a flight attendant in 1985, the year of the Flight 123 accident. Speaking with reporters at the event, Tottori said, "I renewed my awareness that there should be no compromise in safety."

== Memorials ==
Memorials dedicated to Japan Air Lines Flight 123
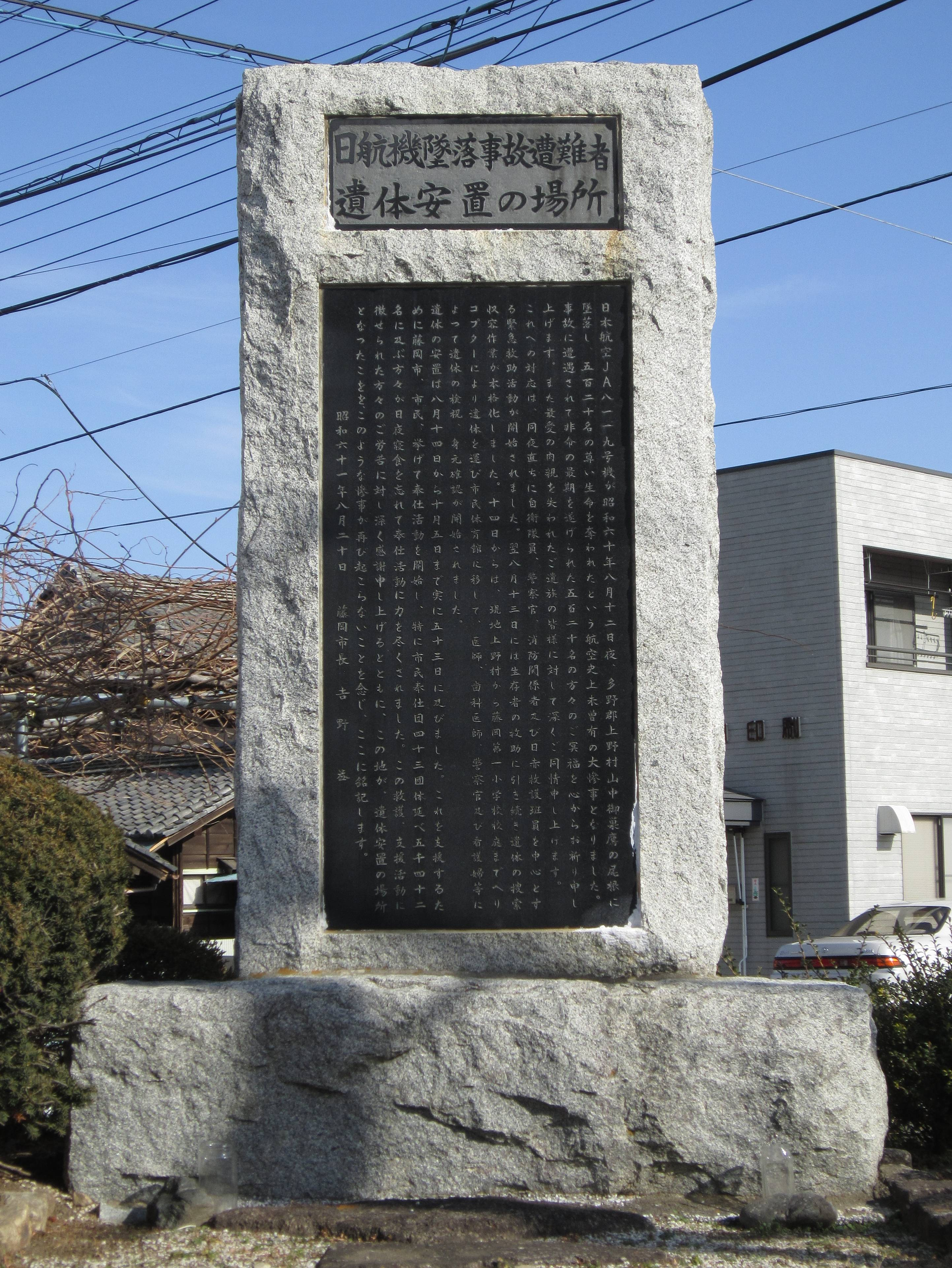
Flight 123 accident monument in Fujioka

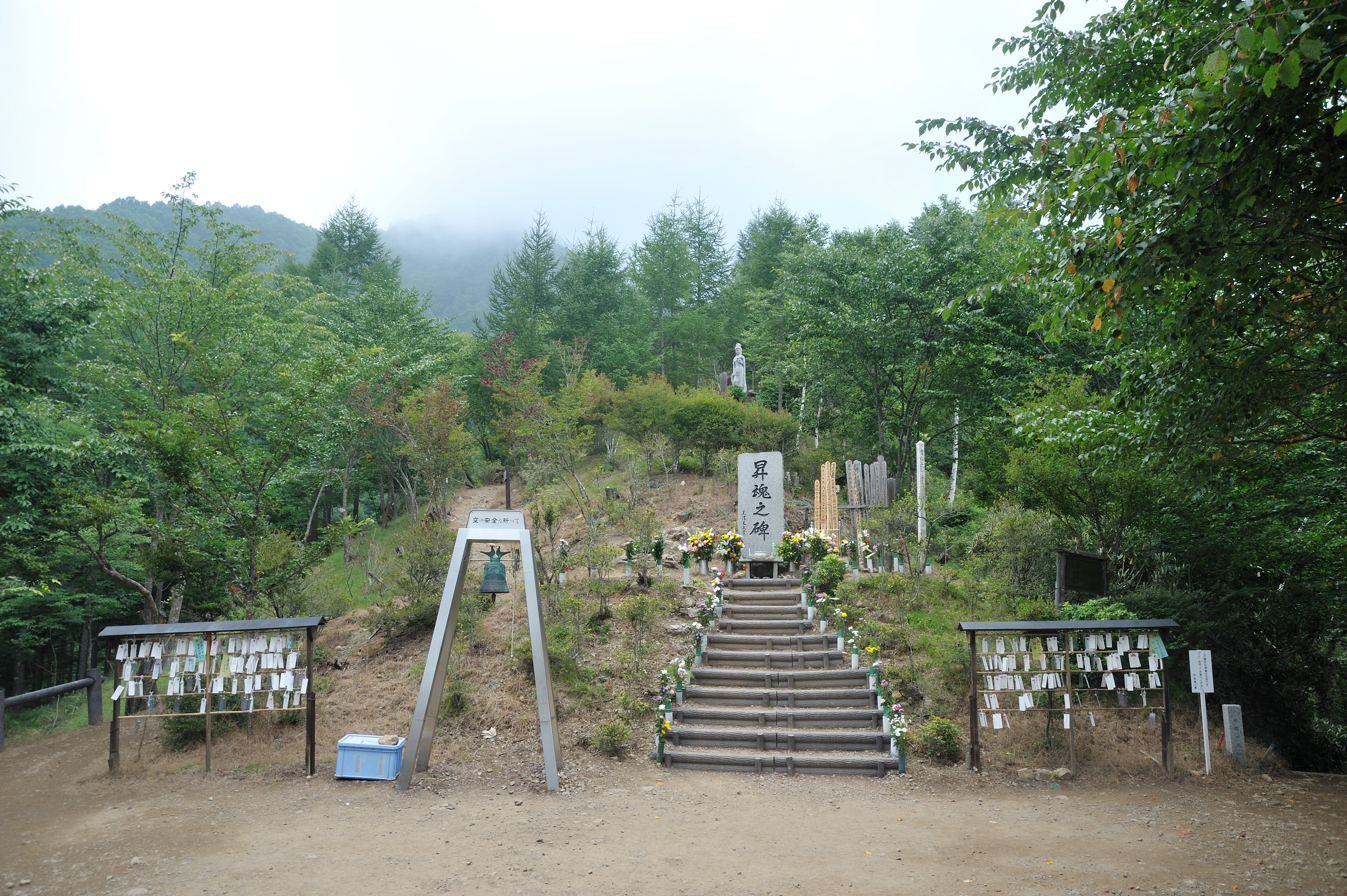
Cenotaph of Flight 123 at Osutaka Ridge

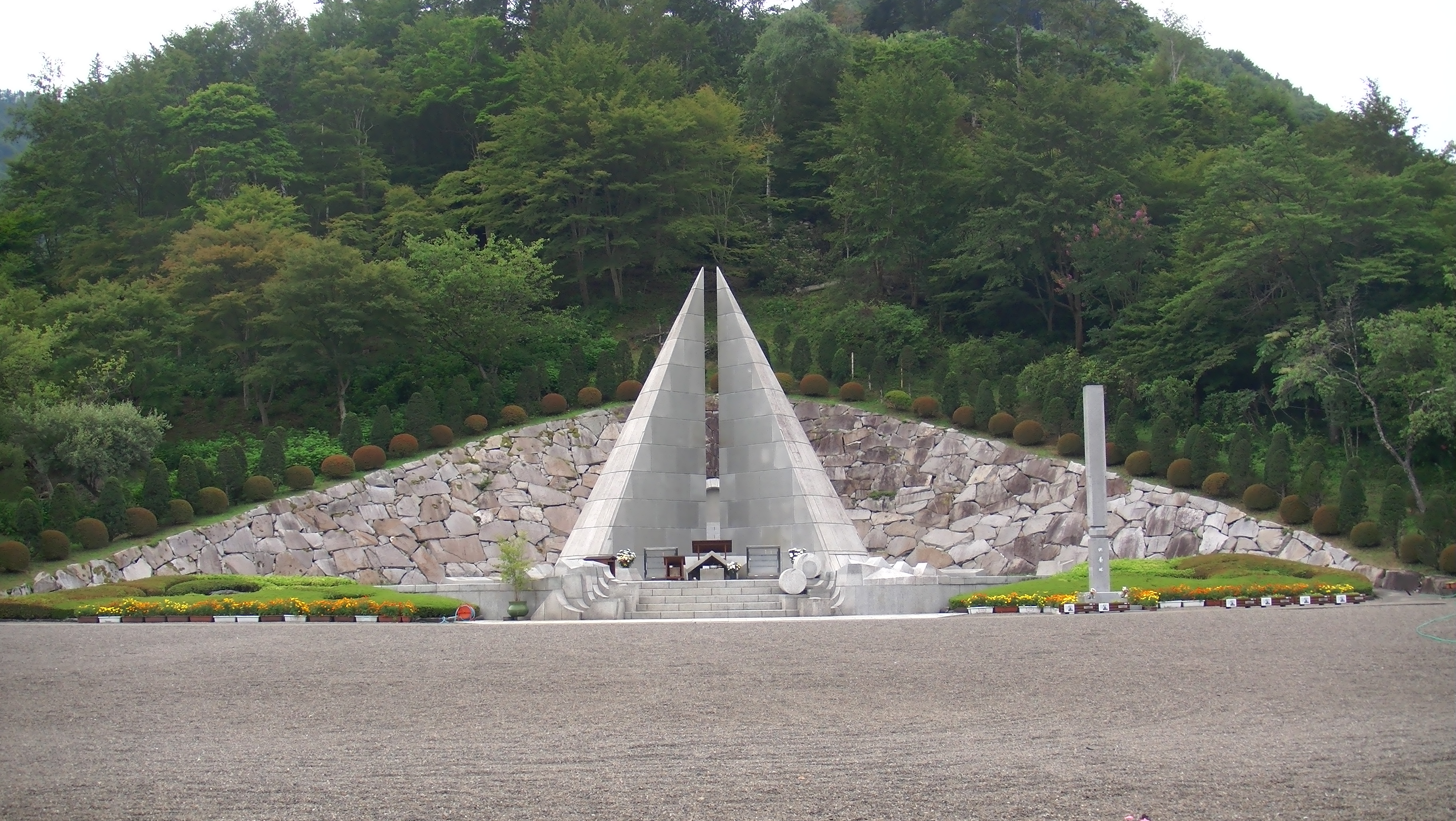
Memorial at Ueno, Gunma

== In popular culture ==
- The crash of Japan Air Lines Flight 123 appeared in three episodes of the Canadian-made, internationally distributed documentary series Mayday: "Out of Control" (2005), "Pressure Point" (2023), and as one of the seven crashes addressed in the 2007 special episode "Fatal Flaw".
- Seventeen (titled in Japanese as Climber's High), the best-selling novel by Hideo Yokoyama, revolves around the reporting of the crash at the fictional newspaper Kita-Kanto Shimbun. Yokoyama was a journalist at the Jōmō Shimbun at the time of the crash. A film released in 2008, and also titled Climber's High, is based on the novel.
- In 2009, the film Shizumanu Taiyō, starring Ken Watanabe, was released for national distribution in Japan. The film gives a semifictional account of the internal airline corporate disputes and politics surrounding the crash. The film uses the name "National Airlines" instead of "Japan Air Lines". JAL refused to co-operate with the making of the film, which it bitterly criticised, saying that it "not only damages public trust in the company but [also] could lead to a loss of customers." The movie features music by Diana Yukawa, whose father was one of the victims of this disaster.
- The cockpit voice recording of the incident was incorporated into the script of a 1999 play called Charlie Victor Romeo.
- The 2004 album Reise, Reise by German Neue Deutsche Härte band Rammstein is loosely inspired by the crash. The final moments of the cockpit voice recording are hidden in the pregap of the first track on some CD pressings of the album.
- In 2016 Machiko Taniguchi, widow of victim Masakatsu Taniguchi, partnered with illustrator Kazuhimo Teishima to self-publish a children's picture book titled My Papa's Persimmon Tree, inspired by her and her family's experience of the crash. The book was translated into English in 2020.

== Sources ==
- Aircraft Accident Investigation Commission (June 19, 1987). Nihonkōkū (kabu) shozoku Boeing 747 SR-100-gata JA8119 Gunma ken Tano-gun Ueno-mura 日本航空(株)所属 ボーイング 747SR-100型 JA8119 群馬県多野郡上野村 [Japan Airlines Co., Ltd. Boeing 747SR-100 JA8119 Ueno Village, Tano District, Gunma Prefecture] (Report) (in Japanese).
  - Aircraft Accident Investigation Commission (July 19, 1987). Aircraft Accident Investigation Report on Japan Air Lines JA8119, Boeing 747 SR-100 (Tentative Translation from Original in Japanese) (PDF) (Report). Archived (PDF) from the original on 2021-08-28.
- Aircraft Accident Investigation Commission (December 14, 1978). Nihonkōkū kabushikigaisha shozoku bōingu-shiki 747 SR-100-gata JA8119 ni kansuru kōkū jiko hōkoku-sho 日本航空株式会社所属 ボーイング式747SR-100型JA8119に関する航空事故報告書 [Japan Airlines Co., Ltd. Boeing 747SR-100 type JA8119 Aviation Accident Report] (PDF) (Report) (in Japanese). Archived from the original (PDF) on 2021-08-28. (Tailstrike incident report)
- Hood, Christopher (2013). Dealing with Disaster with Japan: Responses to the Flight JL123 Crash. Taylor & Francis. ISBN 978-1-136-64109-1.
