= Margaret Ringenberg =

American aviator

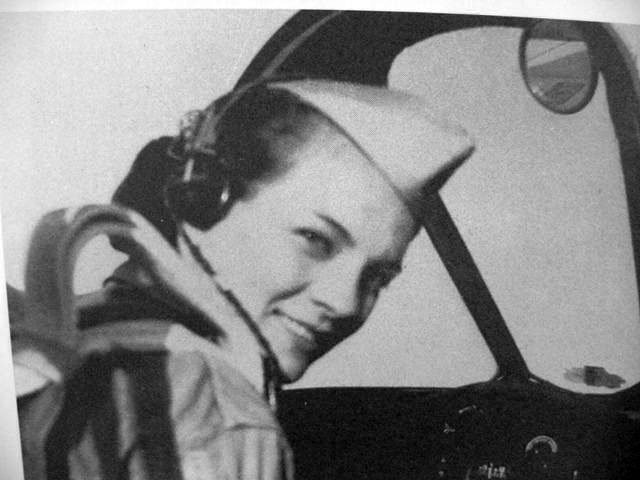
- Margaret at the controls of a fighter during World War II.
- Born: June 17, 1921; Fort Wayne, Indiana
- Died: July 28, 2008 (aged 87); Oshkosh, Wisconsin
- Occupations: Aviator; Author; Spokesperson
- Spouse: Morris Ringenberg

Margaret Ringenberg (née Ray; June 17, 1921 – July 28, 2008) was an American aviator, who had logged more than 40,000 hours of flying time during her career.

== Career and accomplishments ==
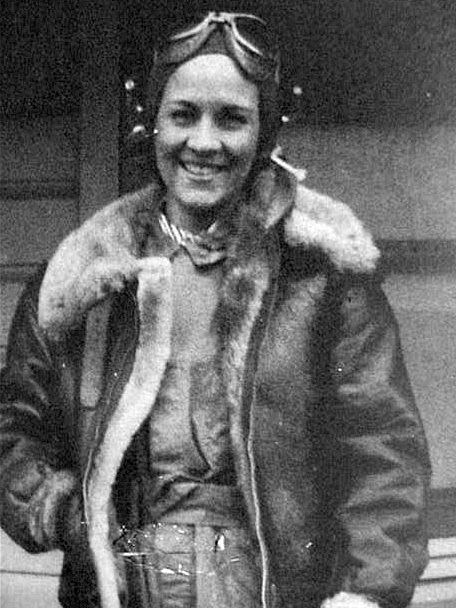
Ringenberg in her flight suit.

Ringenberg became interested in flying as an eight-year-old when she saw a barnstormer land in a field near her family's farm. She trained at a flight training school and had her first solo flight in 1941 as a 19-year-old. Ringenberg began her aviation career in 1943 during World War II when she became a ferry pilot with the Women Airforce Service Pilots (WASP). Although WASP pilots were not allowed to fly combat missions, they served grueling, often dangerous duties, such as ferrying, test flying, and target towing. The WASP corps was disbanded at the end of 1944. Ringenberg went on to become a flight instructor in 1945 and flew as a commercial pilot and instructor for the rest of her life. After the war, she answered phones at an airport.

She began racing airplanes in the 1950s. She raced in every Powder Puff Derby from 1957 to 1977, every Air Race Classic since 1977, the Grand Prix and the Denver Mile High and many others, garnering over 150 trophies for her accomplishments. She completed the Round-the-World Air Race in 1994 at age 72, and in March 2001 at the age of 79 she flew in a race from London to Sydney.

Altogether, Ringenberg logged over 40,000 hours as a pilot.

In 1999, she received the NAA Elder Statesman in Aviation Award in a presentation ceremony in Washington, D.C.

Margaret Ringenberg was married to banker Morris Ringenberg in 1946. He preceded her in death in 2003. They had two children and five grandchildren. All of her children have flown with her in races and all have been in the winner's circle with her to receive trophies.

== Books ==
Tom Brokaw devoted a chapter to Margaret Ringenberg in his book The Greatest Generation. During an interview with Brokaw she said, “I started out flying because I wanted to be a stewardess—you call them flight attendants nowadays—and I thought ‘what if the pilot gets sick or needs help? I don’t know the first thing about airplanes’ and that's where I found my challenge. I never intended to solo or be a pilot. I found it was wonderful.” Following her death, Brokaw said, in a telephone interview "Margaret was one of my favorites".

Ringenberg's autobiography Girls Can’t Be Pilots, written with Jane L. Roth was published by Daedalus Press in 1998 (ISBN 0-9661859-0-0). It was illustrated with several photos from her career both as a WASP and as an air racer. In addition to her autobiography, Ringenberg's daughter, Marsha Wright, wrote a biography of her mother in 2007 called Maggie Ray: World War II Air Force Pilot (ISBN 0-9790446-8-5).

== Death ==
Ringenberg died in her sleep of natural causes on July 28, 2008, while attending the Experimental Aircraft Association annual airshow. She was representing the WASPs.

== Further Information ==
- Paluso, Philip. Wings for Maggie Ray. [Fishers, IN]: Medium Cool Pictures, 2012. ISBN 9781618944443
