= Falcomposite Furio =

Furio
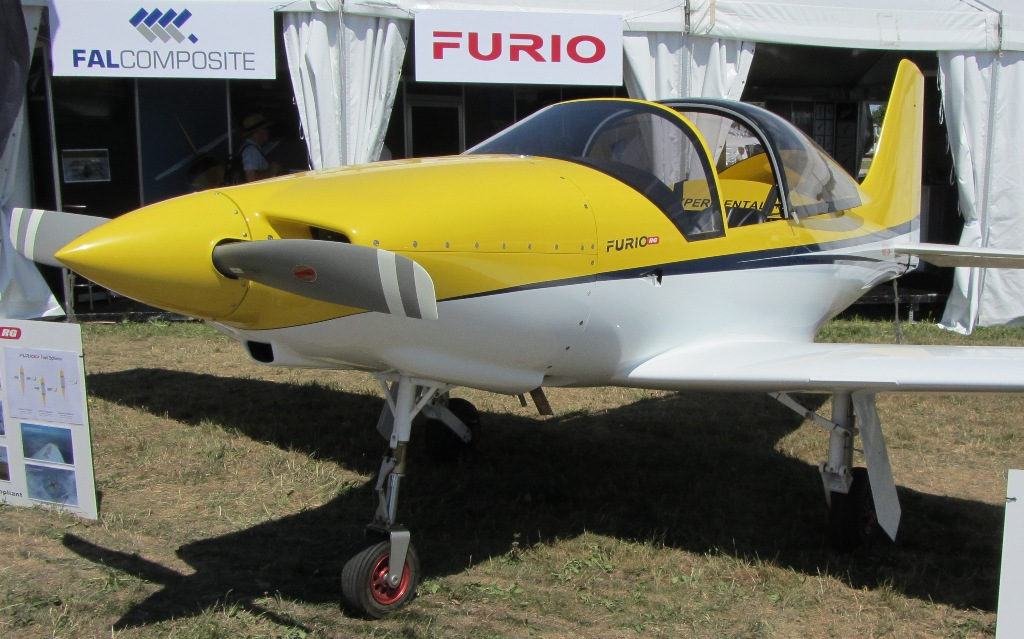

General information
- Type: Homebuilt aircraft
- National origin: New Zealand
- Manufacturer: Falcomposite
- Designer: Falcomposite

History
- First flight: 6 February 2008

The Falcomposite Furio is a two-seat kitplane of carbon fibre construction. It is a two-seat, low-wing monoplane with retractable landing gear. The Furio may be powered by a range of four cylinder horizontally opposed piston aircraft engines.

The aircraft kit, designed in New Zealand by brothers Lapo and Giovanni Nustrini, uses advanced composite material technology to reduce the complexity of the structure and therefore reduce the time required to complete construction.

The prototype, registered ZK-LLG, took off on its first flight on 6 February 2008. As of October 2022, five aircraft are identified on the New Zealand register and one in the United States.

== Registered Aircraft ==
New Zealand

- ZK-LLG (s/n 001)
- ZK-NJS (s/n 002)
- ZK-WBW (s/n 003)
- ZK-PPK (s/n 007)
- ZK-FUO (s/n 014)

Australia

- VH-FUY (s/n 004)

United States

- N861SA (s/n 005)

United Kingdom

- G-FURO (s/n LAA 414-15609)

Canada

- C-FURX (s/n RGN-001)

== Specifications (Furio LN27 RG) ==
Data from Manufacturer's Website

General characteristics

- Crew: 2: student, instructor
- Length: 22 ft 4 in (6.8 m)
- Wingspan: 26 ft 4 in (8.02 m)
- Height: 7 ft 10 in (2.4 m)
- Wing area: 110 sq ft (10.2 m^{2})
- Empty weight: 1,366 lb (620 kg)
- Useful load: 1014 lb (460 kg)
- Max takeoff weight: 2,381 lb (1080 kg)
- Powerplant: 1× XP-IO-360 piston engine, 180 hp (135 kW)

Performance

- Never exceed speed: 240 mph (209 kn)
- Maximum speed: 219 mph (190 kn)
- Range: 1265 mi (1100 nmi)
- Rate of climb: 610 m/min (2000 ft/min)
