= Japan Marine Accident Inquiry Agency =

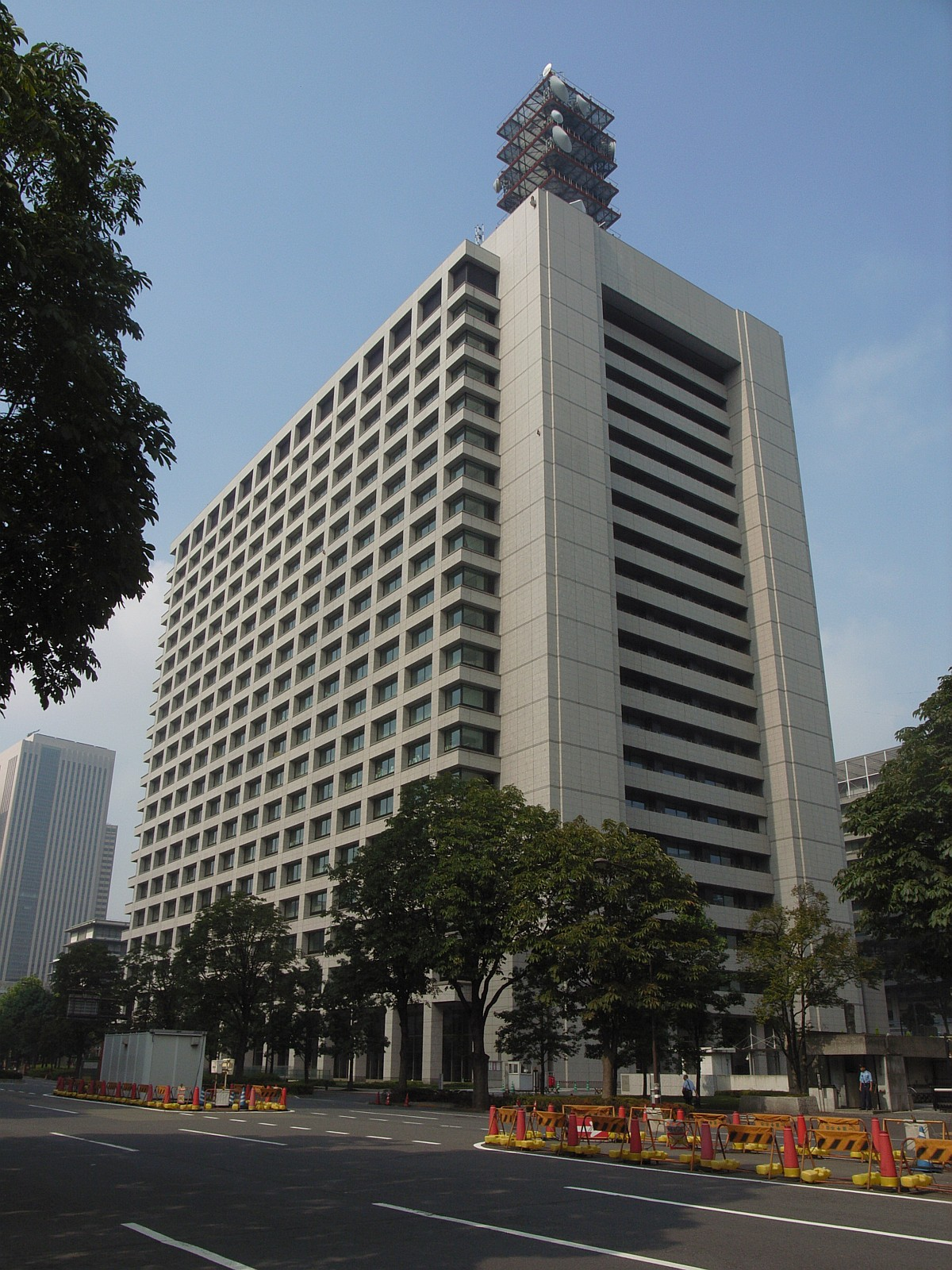
2nd Building of the Central Common Government Office, the building which housed the agency

Japan Marine Accident Inquiry Agency (海難審判庁, Kainan Shinpanchō; JMAIA) was a body of the Japanese government that investigated accidents regarding boats and other marine equipment.

It was established in June 1949. It was housed in the 2nd Building of the Central Common Government Office at 2-1-2 Kasumigasaeki in Chiyoda, Tokyo. On October 1, 2008, the Aircraft and Railway Accidents Investigation Commission (ARAIC) and the JMAIA merged, producing the Japan Transport Safety Board.
