= Ministry of Land, Infrastructure, Transport and Tourism =

Government ministry of Japan

- 国土交通省; Kokudokōtsūshō

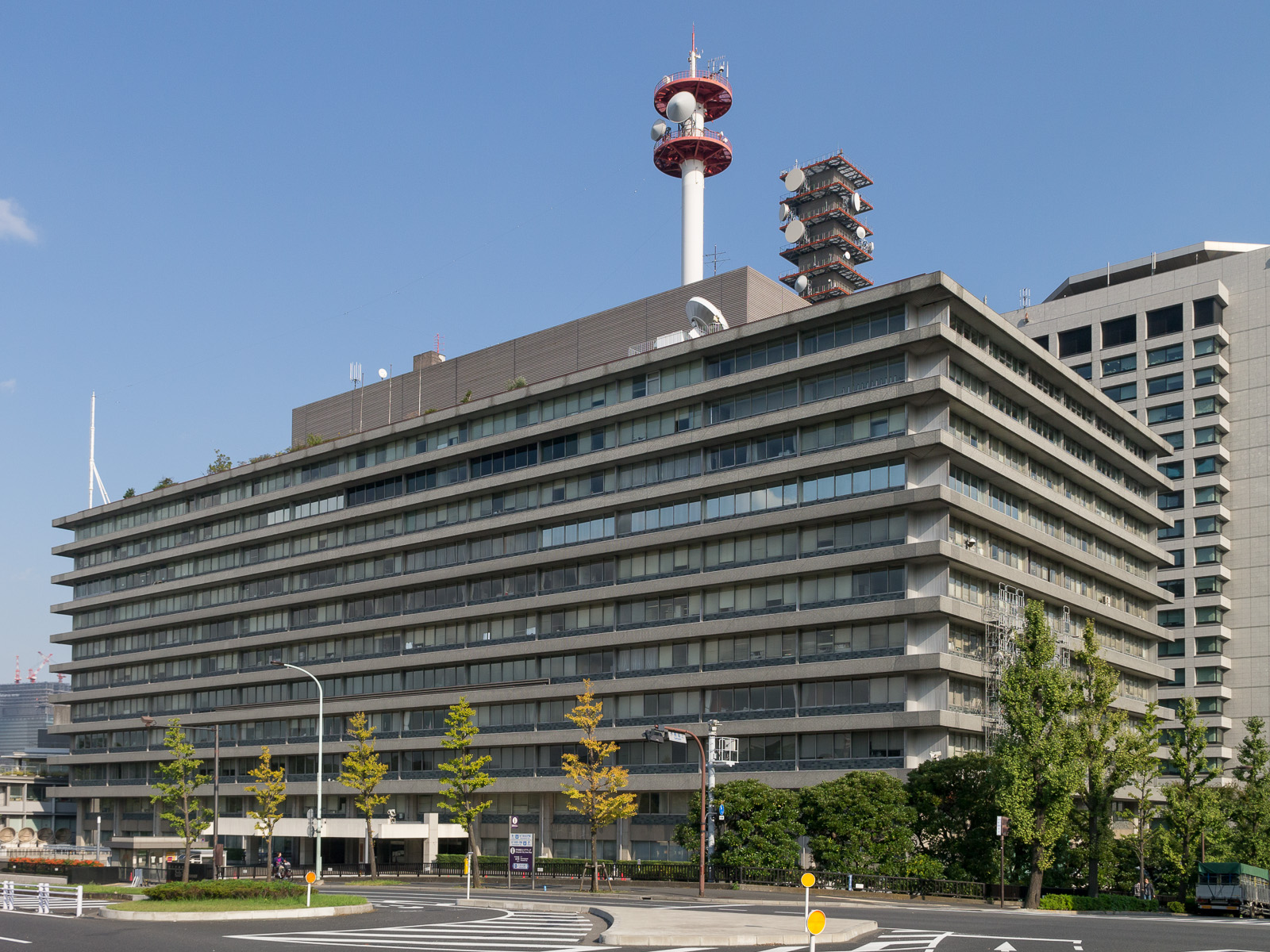
- Central Government Building No. 3, MLIT headquarters

Agency overview
- Formed: 2001
- Preceding agencies: Ministry of Transport; Ministry of Construction; Hokkaido Development Agency (北海道開発庁, Hokkaidō-kaihatsu-chō); National Land Agency (国土庁, Kokudo-chō)
- Jurisdiction: Government of Japan
- Headquarters: 2-1-3 Kasumigaseki, Chiyoda-ku, Tokyo 100-8918 Japan; 35°40′34″N 139°45′01″E
- Ministers responsible: Tatsunori Ibayashi, Minister of Land, Infrastructure, Transport and Tourism; Takashi Ōtsuka, State Minister of Land, Infrastructure, Transport and Tourism; Ichiro Tsukada, State Minister of Land, Infrastructure, Transport and Tourism
- Website: mlit.go.jp/en

The Ministry of Land, Infrastructure, Transport and Tourism (国土交通省, Kokudo-kōtsū-shō; lit. 'Ministry of Land and Transport'; MLIT) is a ministry of the Japanese government. It is responsible for one-third of all the laws and orders in Japan and is the largest Japanese ministry in terms of employees, as well as the second-largest executive agency of the Japanese government after the Ministry of Defense. The ministry oversees four external agencies including the Japan Coast Guard, the Japan Meteorological Agency and the Japan Tourism Agency.

== Background ==
MLIT was established as part of the administrative reforms of January 6, 2001, which merged the Ministry of Transport, the Ministry of Construction, the Hokkaido Development Agency (北海道開発庁 Hokkaidō-kaihatsu-chō), and the National Land Agency (国土庁 Kokudo-chō). Before the ministry renamed itself on January 8, 2008, the ministry's English name was "Ministry of Land, Infrastructure and Transport". One of the mother ministries, the Ministry of Construction, along with the former Ministry of Home Affairs, the National Police Agency and the former Ministry of Health and Welfare, is the successor to the pre-WW2 Home Ministry, and has sent deputy governors and deputy mayors to each prefecture and municipality since becoming the Ministry of Land, Infrastructure and Transport.

== Organization ==
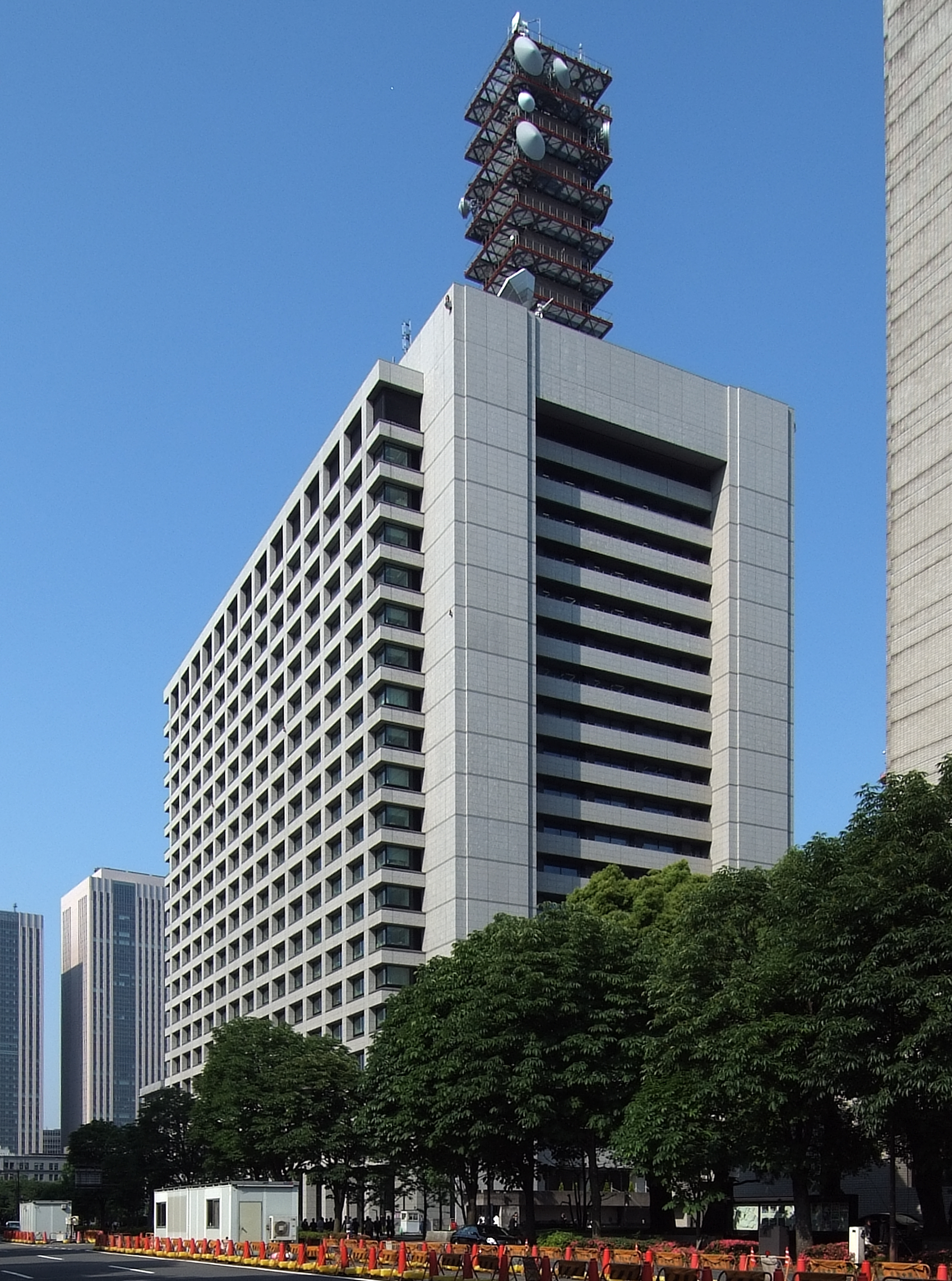
Ministry of Land, Infrastructure and Transport Branch (Central Junction Hall No. 2 Building)

MLIT is organized into the following bureaus:

- Minister's Secretariat (大臣官房)
- Policy Bureau (総合政策局)
- National and Regional Policy Bureau (国土政策局)
- Real Estate and Construction Economics Bureau (不動産・建設経済局)
- City Bureau (都市局)
- Water and Disaster Management Bureau (水管理・国土保全局)
- Road Bureau (道路局)
- Housing Bureau (住宅局)
- Railway Bureau (鉄道局)
- Logistics/Road Transport Bureau (物流・自動車局)
- Maritime Bureau (海事局)
- Ports and Harbours Bureau (港湾局)
- Civil Aviation Bureau (航空局)
- Hokkaido Bureau (北海道局)
- Director-General for Policy Planning (政策統括官)
- Director-General for International Affairs (国際統括官)

=== External agencies ===
- Japan Coast Guard (海上保安庁)
- Japan Meteorological Agency (気象庁)
- Japan Tourism Agency (観光庁)
- Japan Transport Safety Board (運輸安全委員会)
- National Institute for Sea Training (former)
