= National Transportation Safety Board =

U.S. government investigative agency for civil transportation accidents

- Official emblem and seal

Agency overview
- Formed: April 1, 1967; 59 years ago
- Preceding agency: Civil Aeronautics Board
- Jurisdiction: Federal government of the United States
- Headquarters: 490 L'Enfant Plaza SW, Washington, D.C.
- Employees: 437 (2024)
- Annual budget: US$145 million (2024)
- Agency executives: Jennifer Homendy, Chairwoman; vacant, Vice Chairman
- Parent agency: Federal government of the United States
- Website: www.ntsb.gov

The National Transportation Safety Board (NTSB) is an independent agency of the United States federal government responsible for civil transportation accident investigation. The NTSB investigates and reports on aviation accidents and incidents, certain types of highway crashes, ship and marine accidents, pipeline incidents, bridge failures, and railroad accidents. The NTSB is also in charge of investigating cases of hazardous materials releases that occur during transportation.

The board is based in Washington, D.C. It has three regional offices, located in Anchorage, Alaska; Aurora, Colorado; and Federal Way, Washington. The agency also operated a national training center at its Ashburn facility.

== History ==
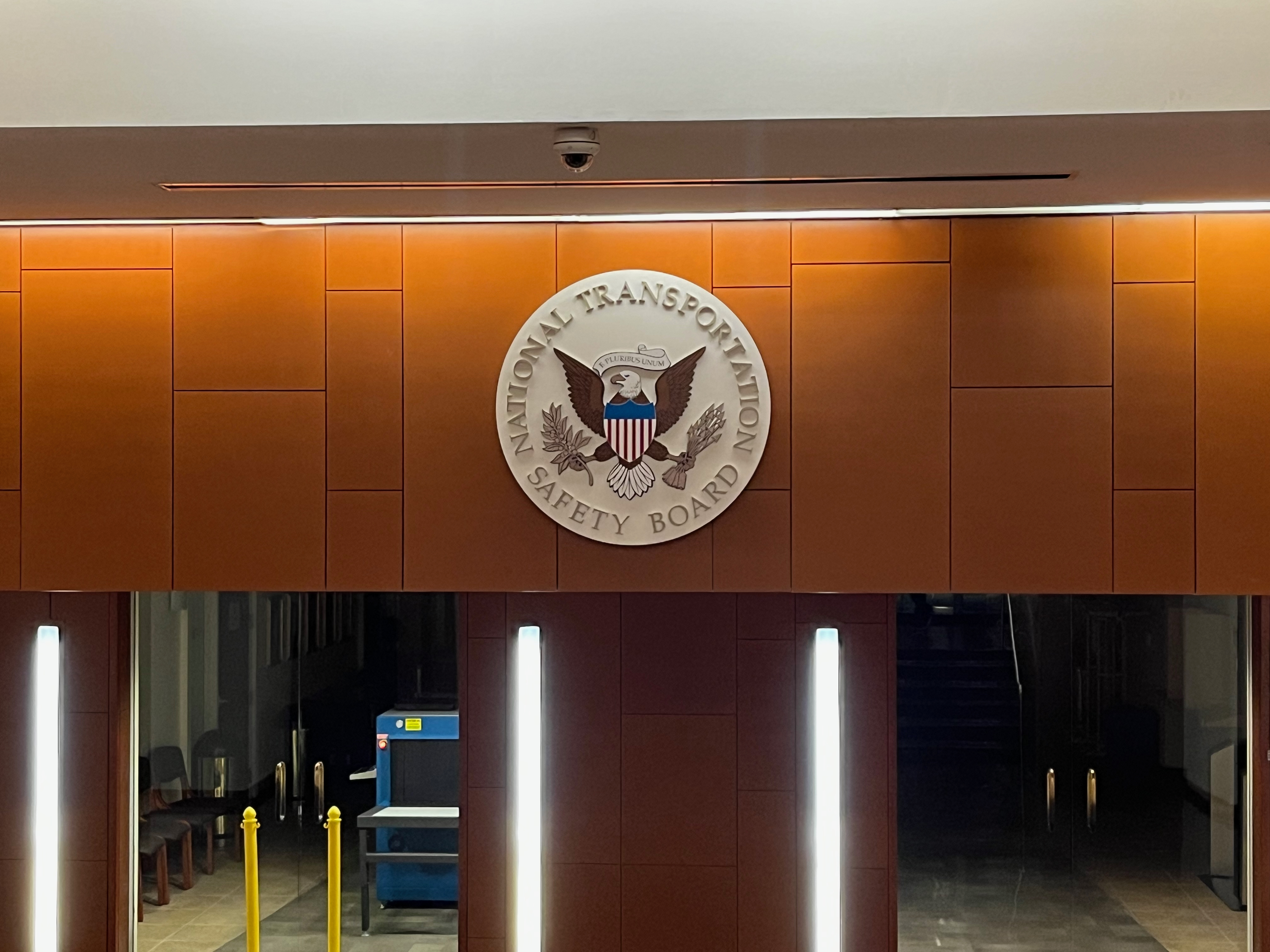
NTSB headquarters

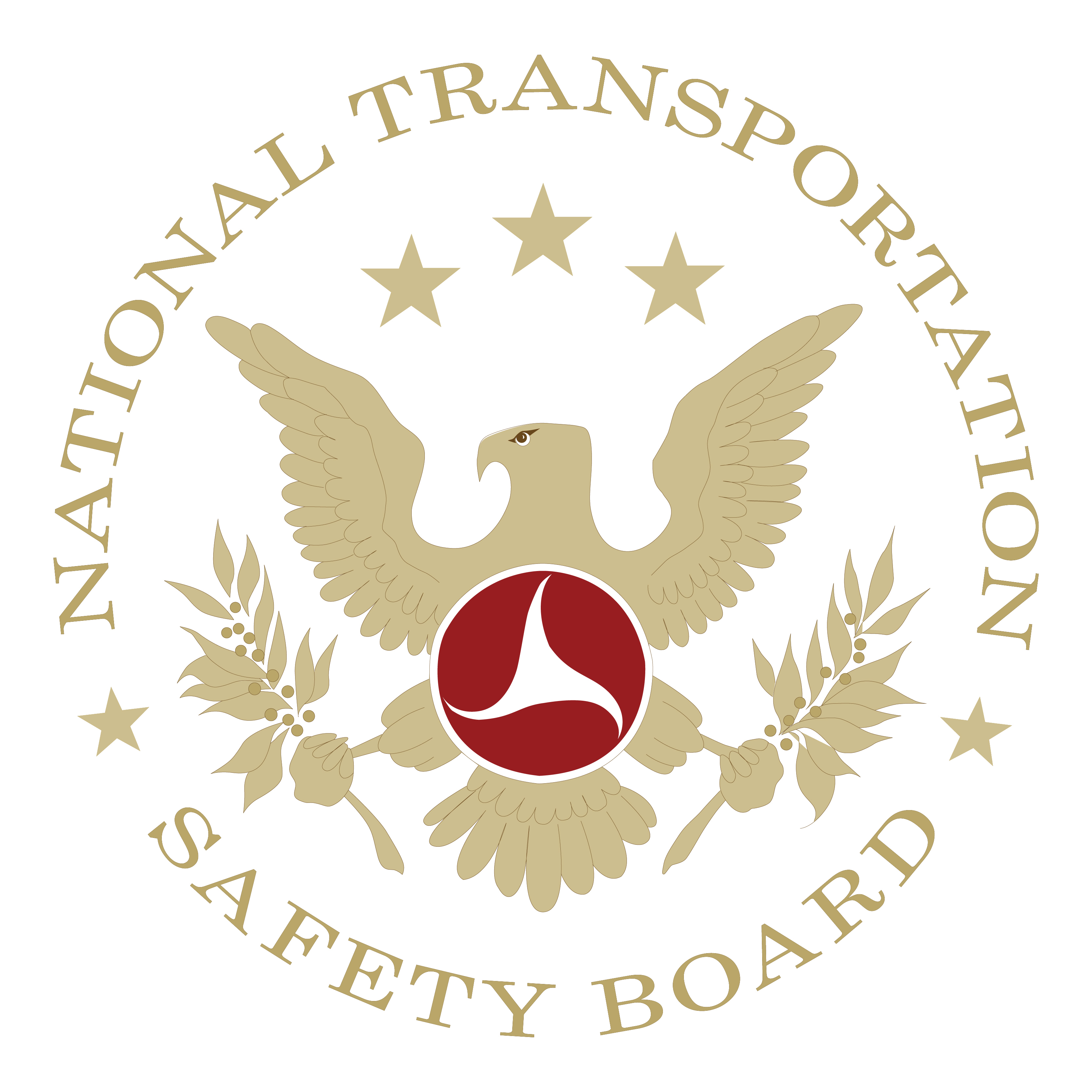
The NTSB seal in use 1967–74.

The origin of the NTSB was in the Air Commerce Act of 1926, which assigned the United States Department of Commerce responsibility for investigating domestic aviation accidents. Before the NTSB, the Federal Aviation Administration's (FAA; at the time the Civil Aviation Authority) independence was questioned as it was investigating itself and would be biased to find external faults, coalescing with the 1931 crash killing Notre Dame coach Knute Rockne and the 1935 crash that killed Senator Bronson Cutting. The United States's first "independent" Air Safety Board was established in 1938: it lasted only fourteen months. In 1940, this authority was transferred to the Civil Aeronautics Board's newly formed Bureau of Aviation Safety.

On April 1, 1967, the Congress created a separate cabinet-level Department of Transportation (DOT), which among other things, established the Federal Aviation Administration as an agency under the DOT. At the same time, the NTSB was established as an independent agency which absorbed the Bureau of Aviation Safety's responsibilities. However, from 1967 to 1975, the NTSB reported to the DOT for administrative purposes, while conducting investigations into the Federal Aviation Administration, also a DOT agency.

To avoid any conflict, the Congress passed the Independent Safety Board Act, and on April 1, 1975, the NTSB became a fully independent agency. As of 2015, the NTSB has investigated over 140,000 aviation incidents and several thousand surface transportation incidents.

== Organization ==
Formally, the "National Transportation Safety Board" refers to a five-manager investigative board whose five members are nominated by the President and confirmed by the Senate for five-year terms. Board members may continue to serve until a successor is confirmed and takes office. No more than three of the five members may be from the same political party. One of the five board members is nominated as the chair by the President and then approved by the Senate for a fixed three-year term; another is designated as vice-chair for a fixed three-year term and who becomes acting chair when there is no formal chair. This board is authorized by Congress under Chapter 11, Title 49 of the United States Code to investigate civil aviation, highway, marine, pipeline, and railroad accidents and incidents. This five-member board is authorized to establish and manage separate sub-offices for highway, marine, aviation, railroad, pipeline, and hazardous materials investigations.

Since its creation, the NTSB's primary mission has been "to determine the probable cause of transportation accidents and incidents and to formulate safety recommendations to improve transportation safety (in the USA)". Based on the results of investigations within its jurisdiction, the NTSB issues formal safety recommendations to agencies and institutions with the power to implement those recommendations. The NTSB considers safety recommendations to be its primary tool for preventing future civil transportation accidents. However, the NTSB does not have the authority to enforce its safety recommendations.

=== Current board members ===
The board members as of November 10, 2026 are:

| Position | Name | Party | Took office | Term expires |
|---|---|---|---|---|
| Chair | Jennifer Homendy | Democratic | August 20, 2018 (Note: As member, became chair on August 13, 2021) | December 31, 2029 (Note: As member, term as chair expires on August 13, 2027) |
| Vice Chair | vacant | —N/a | — | December 31, 2027 |
| Member | Thomas B. Chapman | Democratic | January 6, 2020 | December 31, 2028 |
| Member | John DeLeeuw | Republican | March 16, 2026 | December 31, 2026 |
| Member | vacant | —N/a | — | December 31, 2027 |

== Accident and incident investigations ==
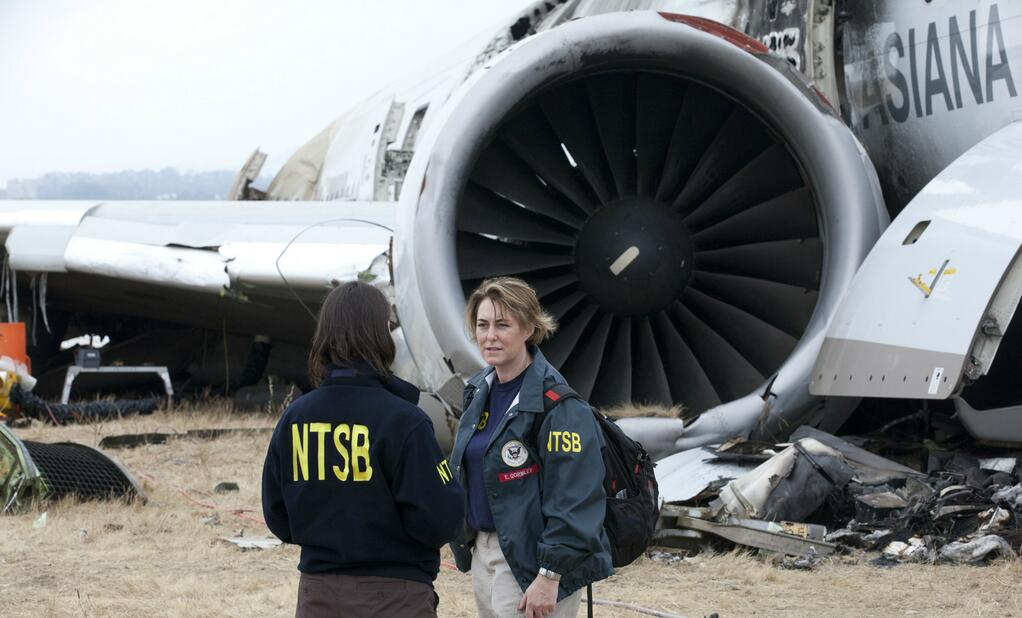
NTSB "go team" members at the Asiana Airlines Flight 214 crash site

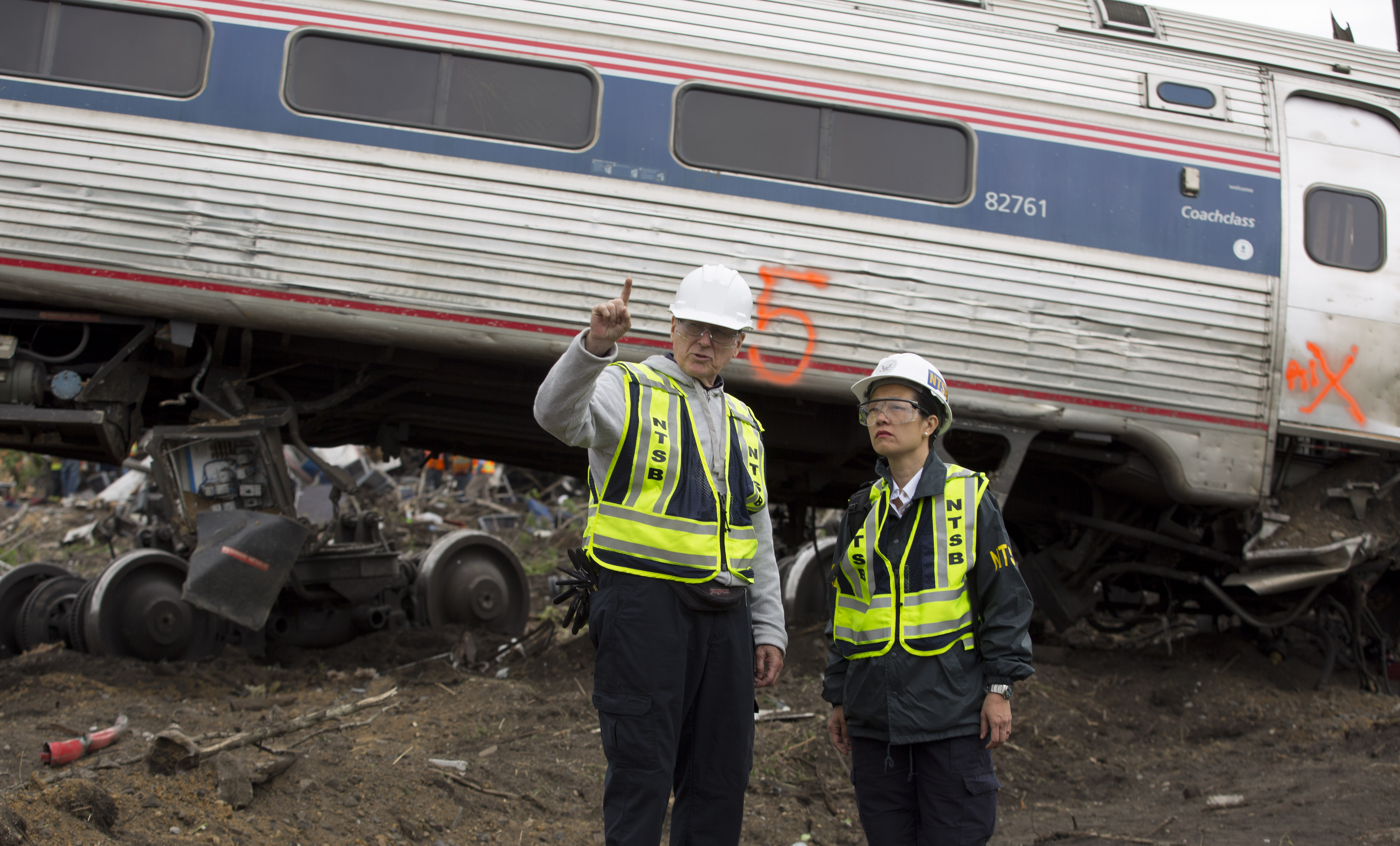
NTSB investigators on-scene at the 2015 Philadelphia train derailment

The NTSB is the lead agency in investigating a civil transportation accident or incident within its sphere. An investigation of a major accident within the United States typically starts with the creation of a "go team", composed of specialists in fields relating to the incident who are rapidly deployed to the incident location. The "go team" can have as few as three people or as many as a dozen, depending on the nature of the incident. The agency may then hold public hearings on the issue following the investigation. Ultimately, it will publish a final report which may include safety recommendations based on its findings. The NTSB has no legal authority to implement or impose its recommendations. Its recommendations are often implemented by regulators at the federal or state level or by individual transportation companies.

If the structure of an aircraft remains largely intact during a crash and does not transmit gravitational forces to occupants that a human cannot tolerate, the NTSB deems it a survivable incident. Humans can generally tolerate 4 to 5 Gs.

=== Jurisdiction over investigations ===
Aviation
The NTSB has primary authority to investigate every civil aviation accident in the United States; the agency is also authorized to conduct investigations involving both civilian and military aircraft "with the participation of appropriate military authorities". Aviation includes certain commercial space accidents. For certain accidents, due to resource limitations, the Board will ask the FAA to collect the factual information at the scene of the accident; the NTSB bases its report on that information.
Surface Transportation
The NTSB has the authority to investigate all highway accidents and incidents, including incidents at railway grade crossings, "in cooperation with a State". The NTSB has primary jurisdiction over railway accidents and incidents which result in death or significant property damage, or which involve a passenger train.
Marine
For marine investigations, jurisdiction into investigations is divided between the NTSB and the U.S. Coast Guard. The division of investigative jurisdiction and responsibilities is prescribed in a detailed Memorandum of Understanding between the two agencies.
Pipeline
The NTSB has primary jurisdiction over pipeline incidents (often the result of third-party excavation damage) which involve "a fatality, substantial property damage, or significant injury to the environment".
Assistance to criminal investigations
The NTSB has primary jurisdiction over civil transportation investigations, not criminal ones. If the Attorney General declares the case to be linked to a criminal act, the NTSB must relinquish control of the investigation to the Federal Bureau of Investigation. The NTSB may still provide technical support to the FBI in such investigations. In two high-profile examples, the NTSB sent aviation accident investigators with knowledge of aircraft structures and flight recorders to assist the FBI's criminal investigation into the murder-suicide of Pacific Southwest Airlines Flight 1771 in 1987, and the September 11, 2001, attacks fourteen years later.
Assistance to other domestic agencies
In addition to assisting the Department of Justice in criminal investigations, the NTSB has also assisted the National Aeronautics and Space Administration (NASA) in its investigations of both the Challenger and the Columbia Space Shuttle disasters. The NTSB can also assist the U.S. military in investigating military incidents within the realm of the NTSB's expertise, such as the crash of an Air Force transport plane in former Yugoslavia that killed more than 30 Americans, including Commerce Secretary Ron Brown.
Assistance to foreign governments
The NTSB may assist in incident or accident investigations outside the United States under certain circumstances. These may include accidents or incidents involving American-registered or American-owned civil aircraft or aircraft with U.S.-manufactured components in foreign air space. Officially, NTSB employees are prohibited from releasing information about "another country's investigation", although this has happened in the past.

=== Use of the "party system" ===
To conduct its investigations, the NTSB operates under the "party system", which utilizes the support and participation of industry and labor representatives with expertise or technical knowledge specifically useful to its investigation. The NTSB may invite these individuals or organizations to become parties to the investigation and participate under the supervision of the NTSB. The NTSB has discretion over which organizations it allows to participate. Only individuals with relevant technical expertise can represent an organization in an investigation, and attorneys and insurance investigators are prohibited by law from participating.

The NTSB considers the party system crucial to the investigative process, as it provides the NTSB with access to individuals with specialized expertise or knowledge relevant to a particular investigation. However, the use of the party system is not without controversy. The NTSB invited Boeing to participate as a party to the investigation of the crash of TWA Flight 800, a Boeing 747, in 1996. While the NTSB relied on Boeing's sharing of expertise, it was later determined that Boeing had withheld a study of military versions of the 747 that investigated flammable vapor combustion in the center fuel tank. Boeing had told the NTSB that it had no studies proving or disproving the vapor combustion theory. In response to political pressure after the Boeing incident, the NTSB commissioned the nonprofit Rand Corporation to conduct an independent study of the NTSB's aircraft investigation process.

In 2000, Rand published its report, which concluded that the party system is "a key component of the NTSB investigative process" and that participant parties "are uniquely able to provide essential information about aircraft design and manufacture, airline operations, or functioning of [the National Airspace System] that simply cannot be obtained elsewhere". However, Rand also found conflicts of interest inherent in the party system, "may, in some instances, threaten the integrity of the NTSB investigative process". The Rand study recommended that the NTSB reduce its reliance on party representatives and make greater use of independent investigators, including from NASA, the Department of Defense, government research laboratories, and universities. As of 2014, the NTSB has not adopted these recommendations and instead continues to rely on the party system.

== Safety recommendations adopted ==
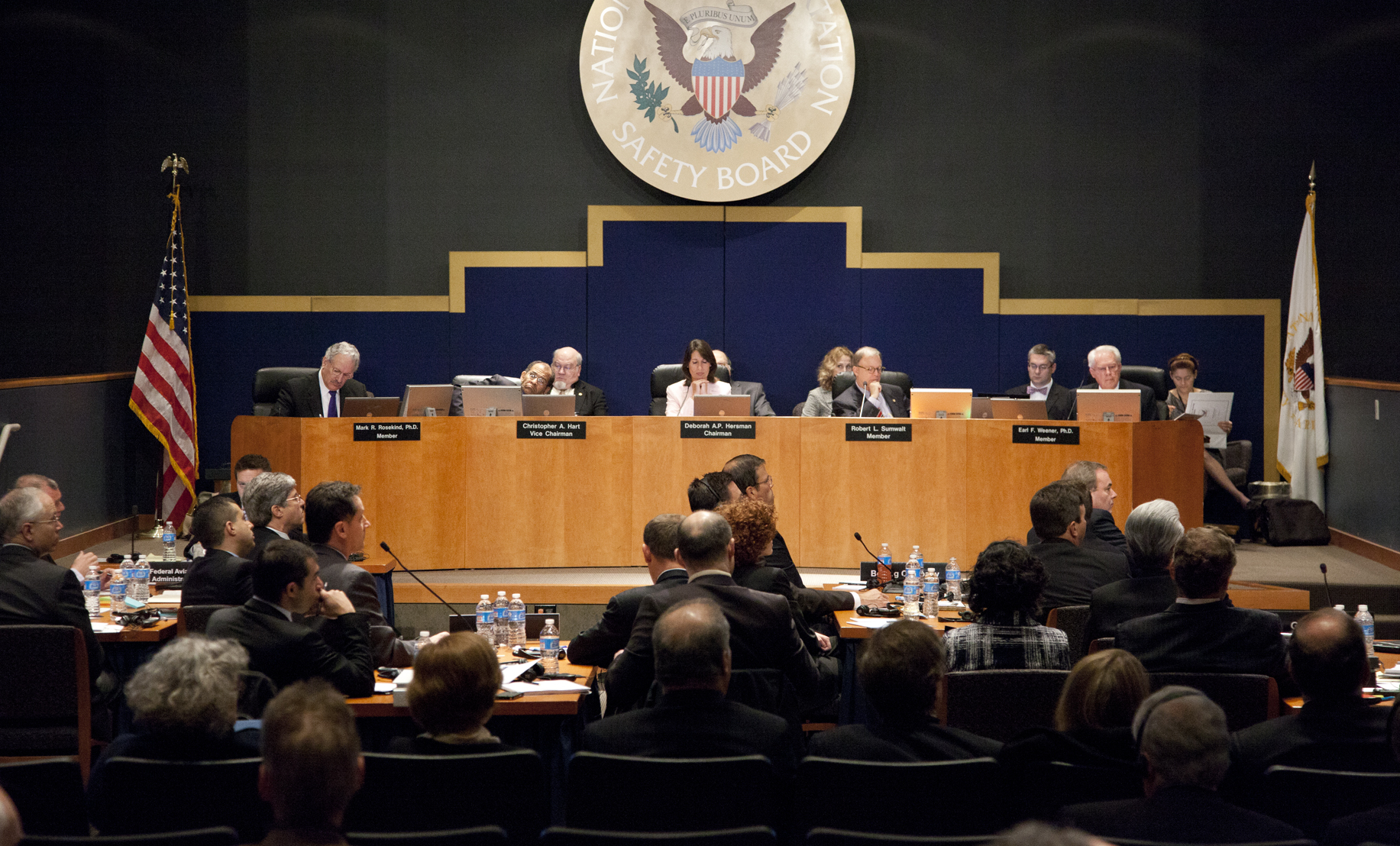
NTSB hearing in 2013 on the Boeing 787 Dreamliner battery problems

As of 2014, the NTSB has issued about 14,000 safety recommendations in its history, 73 percent of which have been adopted in whole or in part by the entities to which they were directed. From 1990 to 2023, the NTSB annually published a "Most Wanted List", which highlighted safety recommendations that the NTSB believed would provide the most significant — and sometimes immediate — benefit to the traveling public.

Among transportation safety improvements brought about or inspired by NTSB recommendations:

- Aviation: Mid-air collision avoidance technology, ground proximity warning systems, airborne wind shear detection and alert systems, smoke detectors in lavatories and fuel tank inerting.
- Highway: Graduated drivers license laws for young drivers, age-21 drinking laws, smart airbag technology, center high-mounted stop lights, commercial drivers licenses, and improved school bus construction standards.
- Rail: Positive train control, improved emergency exits for passenger rail cars, and double-shelf couplers for hazardous material rail cars.
- Marine: Recreational boating safety, improved fire safety on cruise ships, and lifesaving devices on fishing vessels.
- Pipeline: Excavation damage prevention, pipe corrosion protection, and remote shutoff valves.
- Multimodal: Alcohol and drug testing in all modes of transportation.

== Other responsibilities ==
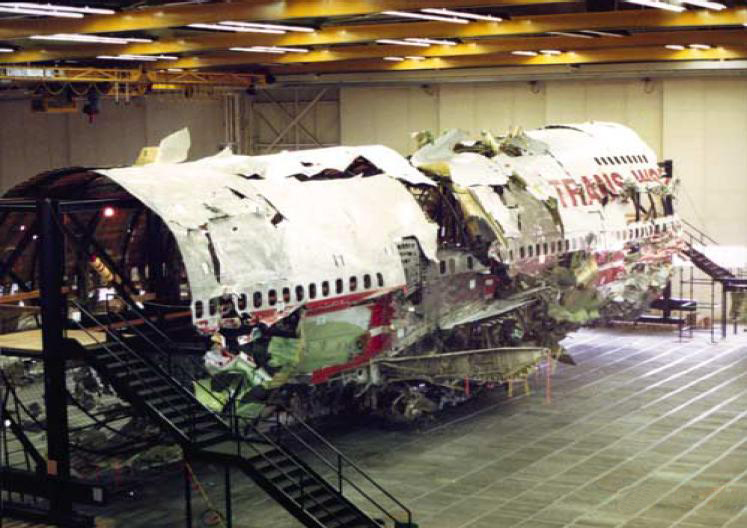
TWA Flight 800 wreckage, as reconstructed by the NTSB

A less well-known responsibility of the NTSB is that it serves as a court of appeals for airmen, aircraft mechanics, certificated aviation-related companies, and mariners who have their licenses suspended or revoked by the FAA or the Coast Guard. The NTSB employs administrative law judges who initially hear all appeals, and the administrative law judge's ruling may be appealed to the five-member Board. The Board's determinations may be appealed to the federal court system by the losing party, whether it is the individual or company, on the one hand, or the FAA or the Coast Guard, on the other. However, from Ferguson v. NTSB, the NTSB's determinations are not overturned by the federal courts unless the NTSB abused its discretion or its determination is wholly unsupported by the evidence.

The Safety Board maintains a training academy in Ashburn, Virginia, where it conducts courses for its employees and professionals in other government agencies, foreign governments or private companies, in areas such as general accident investigation, specific elements of investigations like survival factors or human performance, or related matters like family affairs or media relations. The facility houses for training purposes the reconstruction of more than 90 feet of the TWA Flight 800 Boeing 747, which was recovered from the Atlantic Ocean after it crashed on July 17, 1996, following a fuel tank explosion.

On February 22, 2021, the NTSB announced that the TWA Flight 800 recreation would be decommissioned on July 7, 2021. This decision comes as the lease for the Ashburn training center expires shortly. The NTSB indicated it is moving away from large-scale reconstructions like with TWA Flight 800 and towards using 3D scans to reconstruct accidents. Under an agreement made with the victims' families, when the reconstruction was retained as a training tool, the reconstruction was not allowed to be used as a public exhibit or put on display. For this reason, the NTSB is planning to dismantle and destroy the reconstruction.

== See also ==
- Aviation safety
- Federal Bureau of Investigation
- List of pipeline accidents
- Operation Lifesaver
- School bus safety
- U.S. Chemical Safety and Hazard Investigation Board
- Vehicle inspection in the United States
- Work-related road safety in the United States
- Transportation safety in the United States

=== Other countries ===
- Australia: Australian Transport Safety Bureau (ATSB)
- Canada: Transportation Safety Board of Canada (TSB)
- Denmark: Accident Investigation Board Denmark (HCLJ)
- European Union: European Network of Civil Aviation Safety Investigation Authorities (ENCASIA)
- France: Bureau of Enquiry and Analysis for Civil Aviation Safety (BEA), French Marine Accident Investigation Office (BEAmer), French Land Transport Accident Investigation Bureau (BEA-TT)
- Germany: German Federal Bureau of Aircraft Accident Investigation (BFU), Federal Bureau for Maritime Casualty Investigation (BSU), Federal Authority for Railway Accident Investigation (BEU)
- India: Aircraft Accident Investigation Bureau (AAIB), Commission of Railway Safety (CRS)
- Indonesia: National Transportation Safety Committee (NTSC)
- Italy: National Agency for the Safety of Flight (ANSV), Agenzia Nazionale per la Sicurezza delle Ferrovie e delle Infrastrutture Stradali e Autostradali (ANSFISA)
- Japan: Japan Transport Safety Board (JTSB)
- Malaysia: Civil Aviation Authority of Malaysia (CAAM)
- New Zealand: Transport Accident Investigation Commission (TAIC)
- Nigeria: Nigerian Safety Investigation Bureau (NSIB)
- Sweden: Swedish Accident Investigation Authority (SHK)
- Taiwan: Taiwan Transportation Safety Board (TTSB)
- United Kingdom: Air Accidents Investigation Branch (AAIB), Rail Accident Investigation Branch (RAIB), Marine Accident Investigation Branch (MAIB)
