= European Network of Civil Aviation Safety Investigation Authorities =

Inter-government agency

Agency overview
- Formed: 1 January 2011; 15 years ago
- Jurisdiction: European Union
- Key document: Regulation (EU) No 996/2010
- Website: ec.europa.eu/transport/modes/air/encasia_en

The European Network of Civil Aviation Safety Investigation Authorities (ENCASIA) is a network of civil aviation accident investigation authorities of the European Union.

== History ==
ENCASIA was created by Regulation (EU) No 996/2010 in January 2011.

== Members ==
- Accident Investigation Board Denmark (Denmark)
- Administration for Technical Investigations (Luxembourg)
- Agenzia Nazionale per la Sicurezza del Volo (Italy)
- Air Accident and Incident Investigation Board (Cyprus)
- Air Accident Investigation and Aviation Safety Board (Greece)
- Air Accidents Investigation Institute (Czech Republic)
- Air Accident Investigation Unit (Ireland)
- Air Accident Investigation Unit (Belgium)
- Air Accident Investigation Unit (Bulgaria)
- Air, Maritime and Railway Traffic Accidents Investigation Agency (Croatia)
- Air, Maritime and Railway Accident and Incident Investigation Unit (Slovenia)
- Austrian Civil Aviation Accident Investigation Authority (Austria)
- Aviation and Maritime Investigation Authority (Slovakia)
- Bureau of Air Accident Investigation (Malta)
- Bureau of Enquiry and Analysis for Civil Aviation Safety (France)
- Civil Aviation Accident and Incident Investigation Commission (Spain)
- Civil Aviation Safety Investigation and Analysis Authority (Romania)
- Dutch Safety Board (Netherlands)
- Estonian Safety Investigation Bureau (Estonia)
- Gabinete de Prevenção e Investigação de Acidentes com Aeronaves e de Acidentes Ferroviários (Portugal)
- German Federal Bureau of Aircraft Accident Investigation (Germany)
- Safety Investigation Authority (Finland)
- State Commission on Aircraft Accidents Investigation (Poland)
- Swedish Accident Investigation Authority (Sweden)
- Transport Accident and Incident Investigation Bureau (Latvia)
- Transport Accident and Incident Investigation Division (Lithuania)
- Transportation Safety Bureau (Hungary)

== See also ==
- European Union Aviation Safety Agency
- National Transportation Safety Board (United States)
- Air Accidents Investigation Branch (United Kingdom)
