= Amia =

Amia, AMIA, or AMiA may refer to:

- Amia (fish), a genus of fish
- American Medical Informatics Association
- Anglican Mission in the Americas
- Asociación Mutual Israelita Argentina, a Jewish community center in Buenos Aires, Argentina
  - AMIA bombing, a 1994 terrorist attack
- Association of Moving Image Archivists
- Aviation and Maritime Investigation Authority, an agency of the government of Slovakia
- Mizuki Akiyama, online alias "Amia", a fictional character from Project Sekai: Colorful Stage! feat. Hatsune Miku
- A family of peritoneal dialysis machines manufactured by Baxter International

== See also ==
- Australian Interactive Media Industry Association, or AMIA
- Aimia (company), a frequent flyer loyalty program company
