= European Union Aviation Safety Agency =

European Union civil aviation authority

European Union Aviation Safety Agency (EASA)

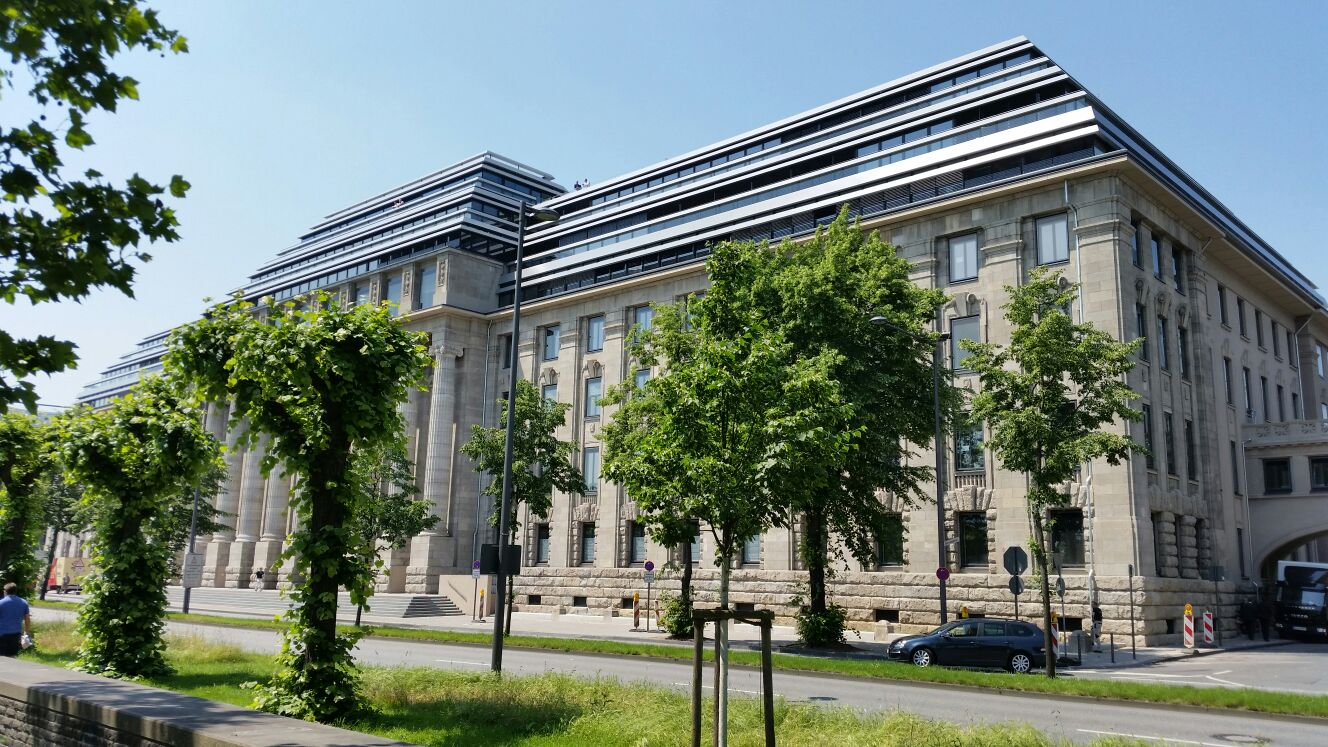
- The offices of the agency in Cologne, Germany

Agency overview
- Formed: 12 July 2002
- Jurisdiction: EU and EFTA members
- Headquarters: Cologne, Germany
- Agency executive: Florian Guillermet, Executive director
- Key document: Regulation (EU) 2018/1139
- Website: easa.europa.eu

Map
- European Union Aviation Safety Agency (European Union)

The European Union Aviation Safety Agency (EASA) is an agency of the European Commission with responsibility for civil aviation safety in the European Union. It carries out certification, regulation and standardisation and also performs investigation and monitoring. It collects and analyses safety data, drafts and advises on safety legislation and co-ordinates with similar organisations in other parts of the world.

The concept of a European-level aviation safety authority goes back to 1996, but the agency was only legally established in 2002; it began its work in 2003.

== History ==
Based in Cologne, Germany, the agency was created on 15 July 2002 as the "European Aviation Safety Agency", and reached full functionality in 2008, taking over functions of the Joint Aviation Authorities. It was renamed the "European Union Aviation Safety Agency" in 2018. European Free Trade Association countries participate in the agency. The United Kingdom was a member until the end of the Brexit transition period on 31 December 2020.

The responsibilities of the agency include the analysis and research of safety parameters, authorising foreign operators, and advising the European Commission on the drafting of EU legislation. It also implements and monitors safety rules (including inspections in the member states), gives type certification of aircraft and components, and approves organisations involved in the design, manufacture and maintenance of aeronautical products.

As part of Single European Sky II (SES-II), an initiative to standardise and coordinate all air traffic control over the EU, the agency has been given additional tasks, which were implemented before 2013. Since 4 December 2012, EASA is able to certify functional airspace blocks if more than three parties are involved.

The EU commission is proposing to further expand EASA mandate to act the European Performance Review Board, with a clear separation of National Supervisory Agencies and Air Navigation Service Providers.

In 2012, the European Court of Auditors (ECA) found that the agency did not have an agency-specific conflict of interest policy and procedures. EASA did not obtain or assess the declarations of interest for staff, management board, board of appeal and experts. In its report, ECA declared that:

The worst performer among the four was the EASA, based in Cologne, which failed in all four areas that the report analyzed – on experts, staff, management board, and board of appeals.

It was recommended that the organisation adopt its own ethical standards because the then-existing condition exposed the agency to a substantial crisis of credibility as well as the incidence of favouritism and conflict of interest. For member-countries and other stakeholders, fairness is of paramount importance. This is because the European Union has been increasingly strengthening EASA's role, giving the agency independence. A discussion regarding the permission for the agency to impose financial penalties for safety violations is also underway.

== Responsibilities ==
EASA is responsible for new type certificates and other design-related airworthiness approvals for aircraft, engines, propellers and parts. EASA works with the EU member states' civil aviation authorities (CAAs) but has taken over many of their functions in the interest of aviation standardisation across the EU and in the non-EU member Turkey. EASA is also responsible for assisting the European Commission in negotiating international harmonisation agreements with the "rest of the world" on behalf of the EU member states, and it concludes technical agreements at a working level directly with its counterparts around the world such as the US Federal Aviation Administration (FAA). EASA also sets policy for aeronautical repair stations (Part 145 organisations in Europe and the US, also known as Part 571 organisations in Canada) and issues repair station certificates for repair stations located outside the EU, which permit foreign repair stations to perform work that is acceptable to the EU on its aircraft). EASA has developed regulations for air operations, flight crew licensing and non-EU aircraft used in the EU, which applied since the required European legislation to expand the agency's remit entered into force. The legislation was published on 19 March 2008.

EASA has had its scope enlarged, as part of the new delegation in 2018, to also cover UAVs. The first 2 regulations (EU DR 2019-945 & EU IR 947) for drones were effective by 30 December 2019 in order for them to also cover the UK (Brexit).

=== Annual safety review ===
The agency publishes an annual safety review with statistics on European and worldwide civil aviation safety. Some information derives from the International Civil Aviation Organization and the NLR Air Transport Safety Institute.

In June 2020, EASA banned Pakistan International Airlines from flying to Europe after a fatal crash in May caused by pilot error. An investigation discovered that one third of pilot licenses in Pakistan are fraudulent.

== States subject to EASA services and oversight ==
As an EU agency, the EASA is not a membership organisation. All states which are a member of the EU also take part in EASA's services and are subject to oversight by EASA. It is not possible to opt out of the arrangement without withdrawing from the EU.

Those European countries which are not members of the EU but members of EFTA, namely Liechtenstein, Norway, Switzerland, and Iceland, have been granted participation to the arrangement under Article 129 of the Basic Regulation (Regulation 2018/1139). These states are members of the management board, but do not have voting rights. While the legal basis is different for states which are members of the EU and those who are not, the EASA has the same power for all states who participate in the arrangement.

There are also working relationships with other regional and international authorities. For example, EASA cooperates with most of the EU's Eastern Partnership member states through EASA's Pan-European Partners (PANEP) initiative in which countries such as Armenia, Azerbaijan, Georgia, Moldova and Ukraine co-operate on the implementation of EU aviation safety rules and comprehensive aviation agreements.

=== List of Current EASA Member-States ===
- (Austria) Supreme Civil Aviation Authority (Oberste Zivilluftfahrtbehörde)
- (Belgium) Belgian Civil Aviation Authority
- Civil Aviation Administration (Bulgaria)
- (Croatia) Croatian Civil Aviation Agency
- Department of Civil Aviation (Cyprus)
- Civil Aviation Authority of the Czech Republic
- (Denmark) Danish Civil Aviation and Railway Authority
- (Estonia) Estonian Civil Aviation Administration
- (Finland) Finnish Transport and Communications Agency
- Directorate General for Civil Aviation (France)
- (Germany) Federal Aviation Office
- (Greece) Hellenic Civil Aviation Authority
- National Transport Authority (Hungary)
- (Iceland) Icelandic Transport Authority
- (Republic of Ireland) Irish Aviation Authority
- (Italy) National Agency for Civil Aviation
- (Latvia) Latvian Civil Aviation Agency
- Office of Civil Aviation of Liechtenstein
- (Lithuania) Public Transport Competence Agency
- Directorate of Civil Aviation of Luxembourg
- Civil Aviation Directorate of Malta
- (Netherlands) Human Environment and Transport Inspectorate
- Civil Aviation Authority of Norway
- (Poland) Civil Aviation Authority
- National Authority of Civil Aviation of Portugal
- (Romania) Romanian Civil Aeronautical Authority
- (Slovakia) Civil Aviation Authority of the Slovak Republic
- (Slovenia) Civil Aviation Authority of the Slovenian Republic
- (Spain) Spanish Aviation Safety and Security Agency
- (Sweden) Swedish Transport Agency
- (Switzerland) Federal Office for Civil Aviation

=== Former EASA Member-States ===
Prior to the UK's withdrawal from the EU, the UK Civil Aviation Authority was an EASA member-state.

== Certification ==
On 28 September 2003, the agency took over responsibility for the airworthiness and environmental certification of all aeronautical products, parts, and appliances designed, manufactured, maintained or used by persons under the regulatory oversight of EU Member States.

Certain categories of aeroplanes are however deliberately left outside EASA responsibility, thus remaining under control of the national CAAs: ultralights, experimentals, and balloons are a few examples. They are referred to as "Annex I" aeroplanes (formerly known as "Annex II" aeroplanes), and are listed on the EASA website.

In July 2017, EASA and the Civil Aviation Authority of Singapore entered into a working arrangement to recognise each other's certifications.

=== Aircraft classification ===
The agency defines several classes of aircraft, each with their own ruleset for certification and maintenance and repair. EASA established safety levels according to a risk hierarchy. For non-commercial operations, a set of rules was developed to achieve safety goals. EASA difference non-commercial operations between non-commercial operations other than complex aircraft (NCO) and non-commercial operations with complex motor-powered aircraft.

EASA has started to introduce basic regulations for unmanned aircraft (drones) which are divided between open category (no operational approval is required), specific category (requires risk-based operational authorisation), and certified category, where pilots needs a license and operators receive a certificate.

== See also ==
- EASA pilot licensing
- List of aviation, aerospace and aeronautical abbreviations
- EASA CS-VLA (Certification Specification for Very Light Aircraft)
- European Civil Aviation Conference (ECAC)
- European Network of Civil Aviation Safety Investigation Authorities (ENCASIA)
- European Organisation for the Safety of Air Navigation (Eurocontrol)
- Federal Aviation Regulations
- Civil aviation authority
