= French Marine Accident Investigation Office =

French government agency

BEAmer has been headquartered in La Défense, seen in this image. Its current head office is the Grande Arche (centre) while it had been previously based in the Tour Pascal B (to the far left of the Grande Arche) and Tour Voltaire

Bureau d'Enquêtes sur les Événements de Mer ('Marine Accident Investigation Office'), known as BEAmer, is the French agency that investigates accidents and incidents of ships. Its head office is in the Grande Arche Sud (South) in the La Défense business district and the commune of Puteaux, Hauts-de-Seine, in the Paris metropolitan area.

== History ==
France established BEAmer, a marine casualties investigation board, on 16 December 1997. In 2003 and 2004 the agency's role within the framework of the French government was finalized.

There is an equivalent agency in regards to state and military vessels, the Bureau enquêtes accidents défense mer (BEAD-mer).

== Governance ==
The director since May 2019 is rear admiral François-Xavier Rubin de Cervens, (Administrator for Maritime Affairs). Merchant marine Captain and chief engineer.

Its head office was previously in Tour Pascal B in Puteaux and La Défense, and before that, in the Tour Voltaire in Puteaux and La Défense. In the past the head office was in the 5th arrondissement of Paris.

== See also ==
- Bureau of Enquiry and Analysis for Civil Aviation Safety (Bureau d'Enquêtes et d'Analyses pour la Sécurité de l'Aviation Civile, BEA)
- French Land Transport Accident Investigation Bureau (Bureau d'Enquêtes sur les Accidents de Transport Terrestre, BEA-TT)
- Federal Bureau for Maritime Casualty Investigation
- Marine Accident Investigation Branch
- National Transportation Safety Board
