= Ministry of Transport and Construction (Slovakia) =

Government ministry of Slovakia

- Ministerstvo dopravy, výstavby a regionálneho rozvoja Slovenskej republiky
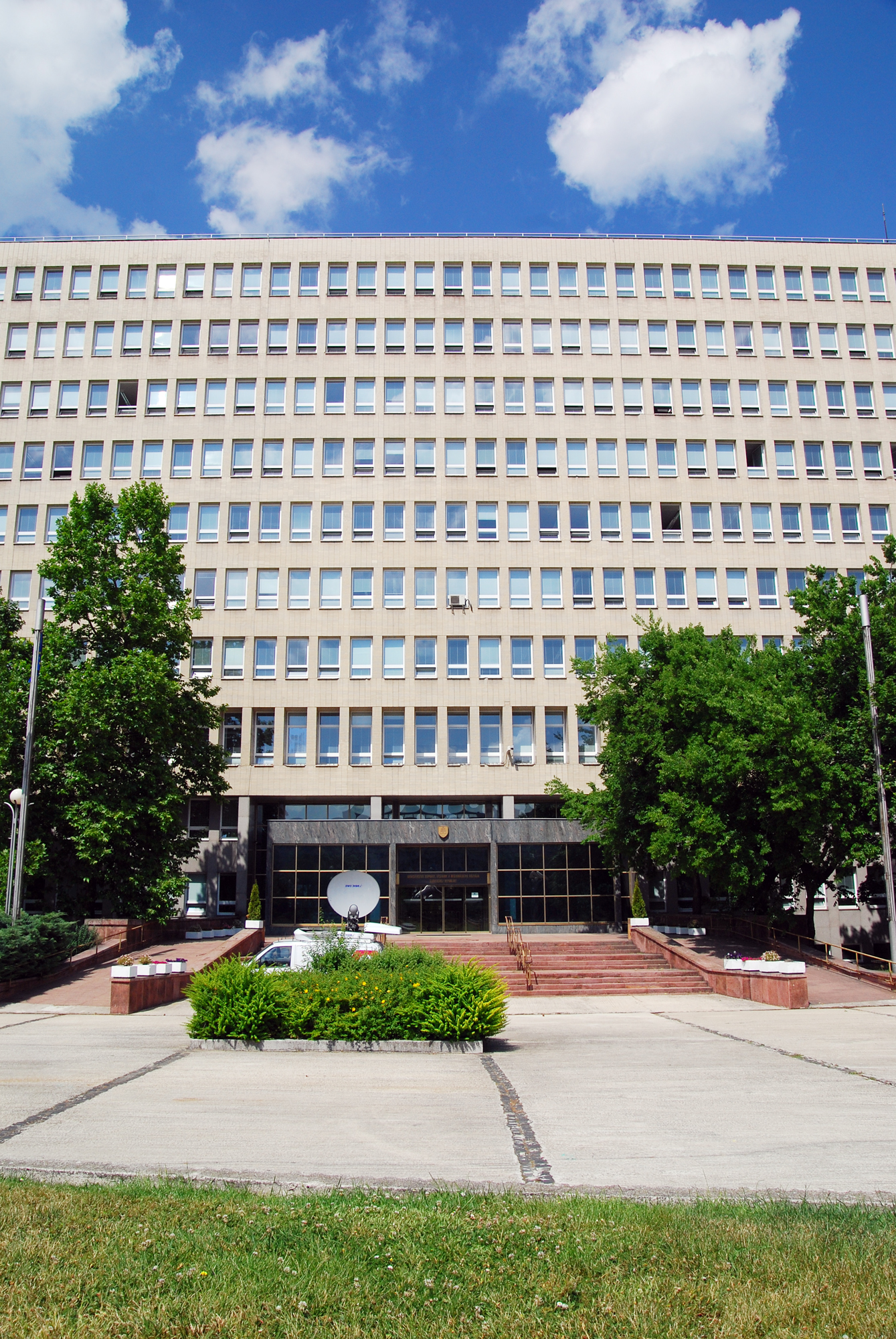

Agency overview
- Formed: 1992
- Jurisdiction: Slovakia
- Headquarters: Námestie Slobody 6, Bratislava
- Agency executive: Jozef Ráž
- Website: https://www.mindop.sk/

The Ministry of Transport and Construction (Slovak: Ministerstvo dopravy, výstavby a regionálneho rozvoja Slovenskej republiky, MDVRR), previously the Ministry of Transport, Posts and Telecommunications of SR (Slovak: Ministerstvo dopravy, pôšt a telekomunikácií SR, MTPT SR), is a government ministry of Slovakia. Its headquarters are in Bratislava. As of 2023, Jozef Ráž is the Minister. It is also known as the MoT SK.

== Agencies ==
The Aviation and Maritime Investigation Authority (AMIA, Letecký a námorný vyšetrovací útvar), an independent part of the MDVRR, is the accident and incident investigation authority of Slovakia.
