= Marine Accident Investigation Branch =

British government agency

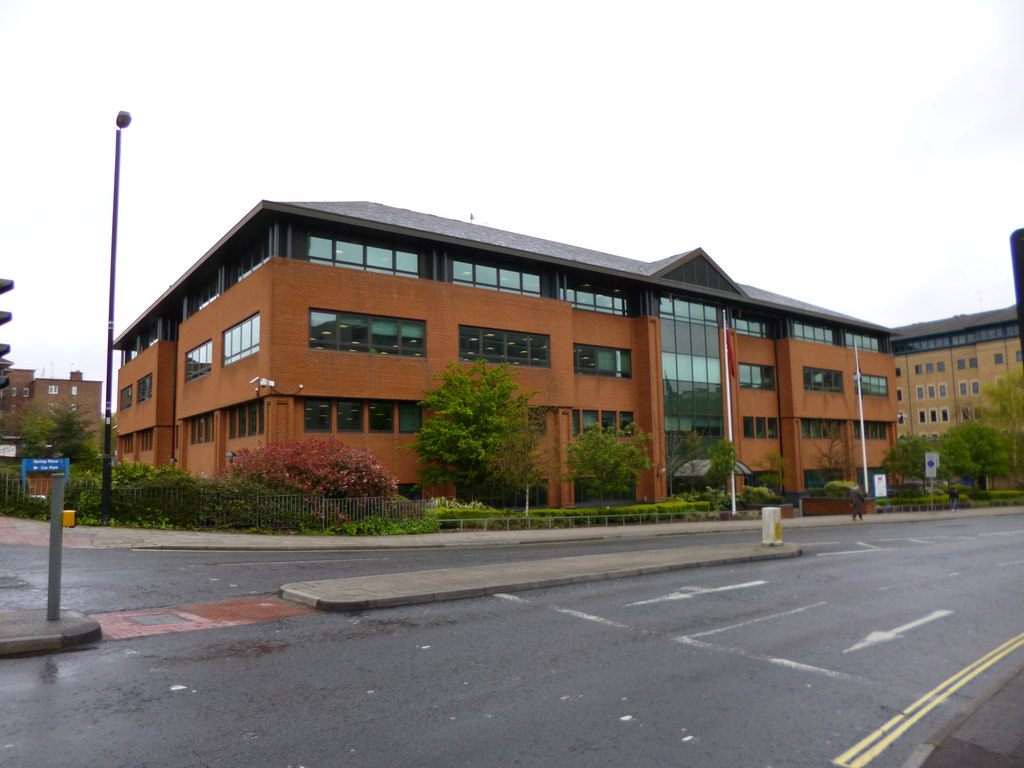
- Spring Place, head office of the MAIB

Agency overview
- Formed: 1989
- Jurisdiction: UK vessels worldwide, any vessels in UK waters
- Headquarters: Southampton, Hampshire, United Kingdom
- Employees: 36
- Annual budget: £4,505,000 (2025)
- Agency executive: Rob Loder, Chief Inspector of Marine Accidents
- Parent department: Department for Transport
- Website: Official website

The Marine Accident Investigation Branch (MAIB) is a UK government organisation, authorised to investigate all maritime accidents in UK waters and accidents involving UK registered ships worldwide. Investigations are limited to establishing cause, promoting awareness of risks and preventing recurrence. It may also participate in other maritime investigations where British citizens are involved or where the UK has a substantial interest. The MAIB is an independent branch of the Department for Transport and is based in Southampton. It was established in 1989 following recommendations from the inquiry into the Herald of Free Enterprise disaster in 1987.

== History ==
The Marine Accident Investigation Branch (MAIB) was established in 1989 as a result of a recommendation of the public enquiry into the Herald of Free Enterprise disaster in 1987, when a ro-ro passenger ferry capsized off Zeebrugge, leading to the loss of 193 lives, many of them British citizens.

== Responsibilities ==
The MAIB is an independent branch of the United Kingdom Department for Transport which can investigate any accident occurring in UK waters, regardless of the nationality of the vessel(s) involved, and accidents involving UK registered ships worldwide.

Empowered by the Merchant Shipping Act 1995, it is a government organisation headed by the Chief Inspector of Marine Accidents, currently Rob Loder.

Investigations are thorough but are strictly limited to establishing cause, promoting awareness of risks and preventing recurrence. Reporting of accidents to the MAIB is mandatory for all commercially operated vessels in UK waters and for all UK registered vessels worldwide. The MAIB receives around 1,200 accident reports annually of which 25 to 30 become full investigations with published reports. The choice of which accidents are investigated is made on the basis of the scope of the safety lessons that may be learned as a result of the investigation; however, accidents meeting the definition of a 'very serious marine casualty' as defined in the regulations covering marine accident reporting and investigation in the UK must be investigated. The reports, which are without prejudice, do not apportion blame and do not establish liability.

== Location ==
As of 2017, its offices are located in Spring Place, Commercial Road, Southampton, Hampshire.

Beginning on 3 August 2009 the MAIB had been headquartered in the Mountbatten House in Southampton. Previously the MAIB was headquartered in the Carlton House in Southampton.

== Publications ==
Accident reports provide a very detailed analysis of one specific accident and recommendations to parties involved.
Safety Bulletins set out immediate safety concerns which may be identified during an investigation.
Annual Safety digests summarise the type of accidents and lessons which can be learnt. This is now classified by vessel type.
Safety flyers are issued if an investigation reveals an urgent general risk.
Safety studies look at patterns of accidents to inform policy makers, including the International Maritime Organization, Maritime and Coastguard Agency and Health and Safety Executive, some of whom have overlapping responsibilities. For example, the Review of lifeboats and launching systems' accidents revealed that 16% of fatalities investigated on merchant ships occurred during lifeboat training exercises. Not one life was saved by a ship's lifeboat, reported in the UK, from 1989 to 1999.

== See also ==
Other British accident investigation agencies

- Air Accidents Investigation Branch - Responsible for the investigation of air accidents in the United Kingdom
- Rail Accident Investigation Branch - Responsible for the investigation of rail accidents in the United Kingdom
- Road Safety Investigation Branch

Equivalent agencies in other countries

- Bureau d'Enquêtes sur les Événements de Mer - France
- Federal Bureau for Maritime Casualty Investigation - Germany
- National Transportation Safety Board - United States
- Canadian Transportation Accident Investigation and Safety Board - Canada
