= Farnborough Airport =

Executive airport in Hampshire, England

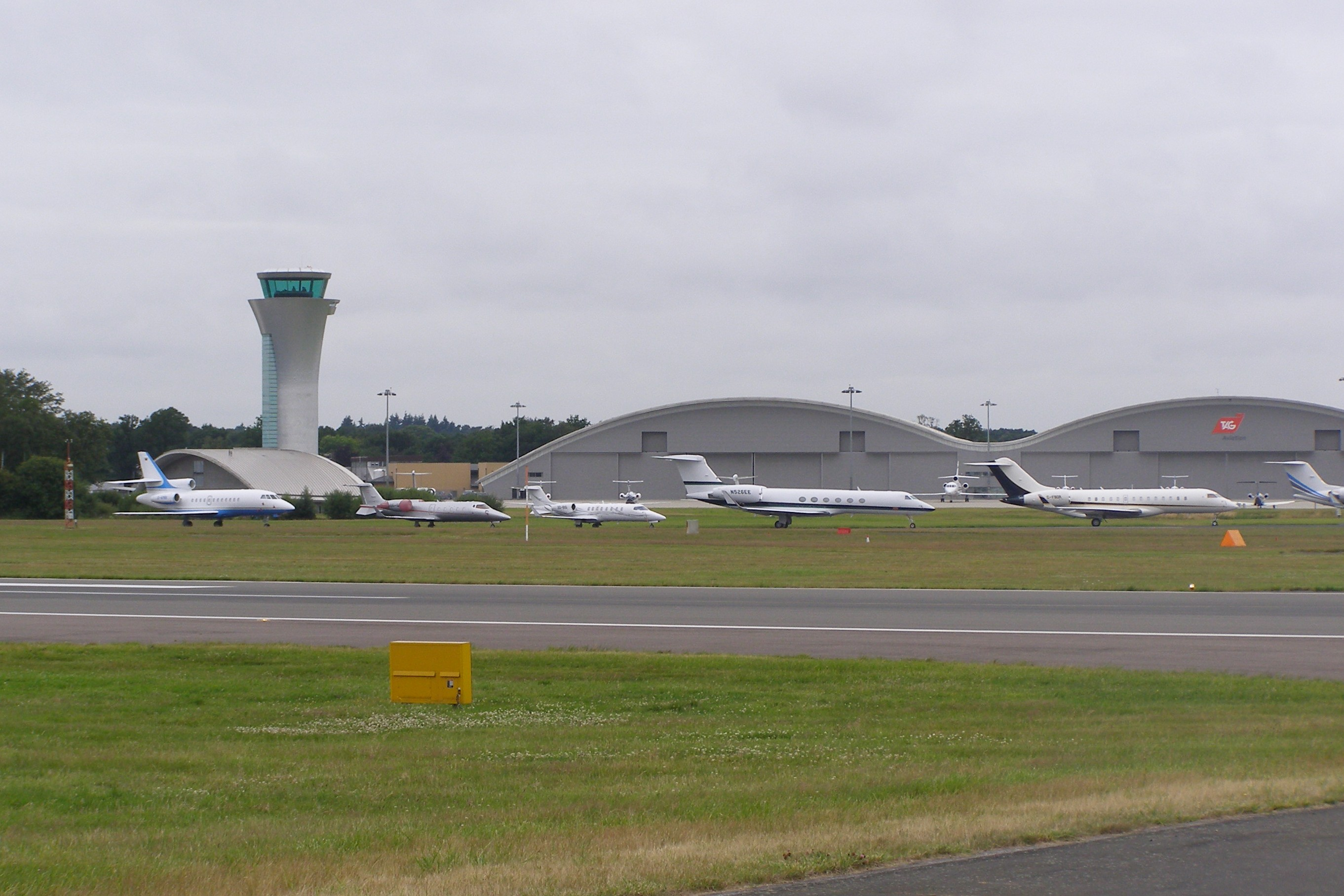
- IATA: FAB; ICAO: EGLF

Summary
- Airport type: Private
- Owner: Macquarie Infrastructure and Real Assets (MIRA)
- Operator: Farnborough Airport Ltd.
- Serves: Farnborough, Aldershot
- Location: Farnborough, Rushmoor, Hampshire
- Elevation AMSL: 238 ft (73 m)
- Coordinates: 51°16′31″N 000°46′39″W
- Website: www.farnboroughairport.com

Map
- Location in Hampshire FAB/EGLF (the United Kingdom)

Runways
Direction	Length		Surface
Direction	m	ft	Surface
06/24	2,440	8,005	Asphalt
- Sources: UK AIP at NATS

Farnborough Airport (IATA: FAB, ICAO: EGLF) (previously called: TAG Farnborough Airport, RAE Farnborough, ICAO Code EGLF) is an operational business/executive general aviation airport in Farnborough, Rushmoor, Hampshire, England. The 310-hectare (770-acre) airport covers about 8% of Rushmoor's land area.

Farnborough Aerodrome has a CAA Ordinary Licence (Number P864) that allows flights for the public transport of passengers or for flying instruction as authorised by the licensee (TAG Farnborough Airport Limited).

The first powered flight in the United Kingdom was at Farnborough on 16 October 1908, when Samuel Cody took off in his British Army Aeroplane No 1.

The airfield is the home of the Farnborough International Airshow which is held in even numbered years. It is also home to the Air Accidents Investigation Branch (AAIB) and the southern office of Rail Accident Investigation Branch (RAIB), both part of the Department for Transport.

== History ==
Farnborough Airport has a long history, beginning at the start of the 20th century with the creation of His Majesty's Balloon Factory and the first powered flight in the United Kingdom in 1908. This subsequently became the Royal Aircraft Establishment, a connection which continues in the Farnborough Air Sciences Trust museum.

Farnborough aerodrome and RAE were bombed during the Second World War, on 13 August 1940 by a flight of Luftwaffe Junkers Ju 88s.

The civil enclave was operated by Farnborough Business Aviation until 2003, when the Ministry of Defence stopped operations at Farnborough. All experimental aircraft were moved to MoD Boscombe Down; the airport was taken over by TAG Aviation. On 27 September 2019 TAG Farnborough Airport Ltd was acquired by Macquarie Infrastructure and Real Assets (Europe) Limited. Its name changed on 10 October 2019 to Farnborough Airport Ltd. Commercial defence research by research firm QinetiQ continues in the adjoining Cody Technology Park.

Farnborough Airfield appeared in the 2008 James Bond film Quantum of Solace, as the Austrian airport from which Bond flies. The airfield was also a location for the 2010 film Inception.

== Units ==
The following units were here at some point:

- No. 1 Anti-Aircraft Co-operation Unit RAF between 11 April 1938 and 1 October 1942
  - ‘A’ Flight between September 1938 and 27 March 1939
  - ‘B’ Flight between 28 September 1938 and 14 April 1939
  - ‘C’ Flight between 26 September 1938 and 14 April 1939
  - ‘D’ Flight between 26 September 1938 and 28 April 1939
  - ‘E’ Flight between 6 January and May 1939
  - ‘F’ Flight formed here on 28 April 1938
  - ‘H’ Flight between 1 and 8 January 1942
  - ‘J’ Flight between 1 December 1939 and 16 February 1940
  - ‘K’ Flight during December 1939
  - ‘L’ Flight between 26 March and 5 April 1940
  - ‘R’ Flight between 30 June and September 1941
  - ‘T’ Flight between 21 January and 25 February 1941
  - ‘Z’ Flight between 11 April and 14 May 1938
- No. 1 (Army Co-operation) Wing RAF reformed here on 5 January 1925 with No. 4 Squadron RAF and No. 13 Squadron RAF. It was disbanded on 12 April 1926
- No. 1 Gunnery Co-operation Flight formed here on 1 April 1934, moving to Calafrana during May 1934
- No. 1 School of Photography RAF formed here during April 1941, moved to Heath End on 17 March 1947
- No. 1 Squadron RAF
- No. 1 Squadron RNAS
- No. 1 (Training) Wireless School formed here at Blenheim Barracks on 8 November 1917. It moved to Flowerdown on 13 November 1918
- No. 2 Aircraft Park formed here on 17 March 1915. Renamed to No. 2 Aircraft Depot on 13 December 1915
- No. 2 Squadron RAF
- No. 4 Reserve Aeroplane Squadron between 29 January and 1 March 1915
- No. 4 Squadron RAF
- No. 5 Squadron RAF
- No. 6 Squadron RAF
- Detachment of No. 7 Anti-Aircraft Co-operation Unit RAF between 14 June 1942 and 30 November 1943
- No. 7 Squadron RAF
- No. 8 Squadron RAF
- No. 10 Squadron RAF
- No. 15 Squadron RAF
- No. 16 Squadron RAF
- No. 22 Group Communication Flight RAF between 6 October 1939 and 1 December 1940
- No. 31 Squadron RAF
- No. 53 Squadron RAF
- No. 70 Group Communication Flight RAF between 1 December 1940 and 17 July 1945
- No. 70 Squadron RAF
- No. 71 Group Communication Flight RAF between 28 June and 22 August 1941
- No. 100 Squadron RAF
- No. 101 Squadron RAF
- No. 108 Squadron RAF
- No. 285 Squadron RAF
- No. 287 Squadron RAF
- No. 290 Squadron RAF
- No. 653 Squadron RAF
- No. 656 Squadron AAC
- No. 664 Squadron AAC
- 845 Naval Air Squadron between 6 and 23 September 1968 with Westland Wessex HU.5's
- 893 Naval Air Squadron between 27 August and 20 September 1962 with de Havilland Sea Vixen FAW.1's
- Detachment 4 of 899 Naval Air Squadron between 4 and 23 September 1983 with Sea Harrier's
- Administrative Wing between 29 November 1914 and 15 January 1918 became Reserve Depot, RFC
- Detachment of 'B' Flight of Airborne Forces Experimental Establishment during December 1943
- Aircraft Park between 18 August 1914 and 22 March 1917
- Aircraft Repair Park formed 25 November 1916
- Army Aircraft Factory
- RAF Army Cooperation Command between 1 December 1940 and 31 May 1943.
- Empire Test Pilots' School between 12 July 1947 and 29 January 1968, attached to the RAE.
- Headquarters Flight between June and August 1914
- Joint Helicopter Support Unit from 1 September 1983
- Meteorological Research Flight between 1 September 1946 and 18 December 1950 then again between December 1952 and 1994
- Photographic Flight formed here during 1918, moved to RAF Chingdford on 9 April 1918
- Photographic Park formed here on 16 June 1919, reverted to School of Photography on 23 December 1919
- RAE Gliding Club
- RAF Photographic Centre between 29 April and 16 June 1919
- Recruits Depot between May 1916 and 15 January 1918
- Reserve Aeroplane Squadron formed here during August 1914, renamed to No. 1 Reserve Aeroplane Squadron on 12 November 1914, renamed to No. 1 Reserve Squadron on 13 January 1916. It moved to Gosport on 7 April 1916
- Royal Aircraft Factory between 11 April 1912 and 1 April 1918
- School for Wireless Operators
- School of Photography between 1 January and 1 October 1917 then became the School of Photography, Maps & Reconnaissance. This unit was disbanded on 16 June 1919
- Southern Aircraft Depot between 1 May 1916 and 1 January 1917 became Southern Aircraft Repair Depot between 1 January and 12 October 1917 became No. 1 (Southern) Aircraft Repair Depot on 12 October 1917, the depot moved to Shrewsbury on 28 June 1919
- Wireless Flight between August and 27 September 1914
- Wireless School between 1915 and 24 August 1916 then again between 18 October and 8 November 1917

== Infrastructure ==
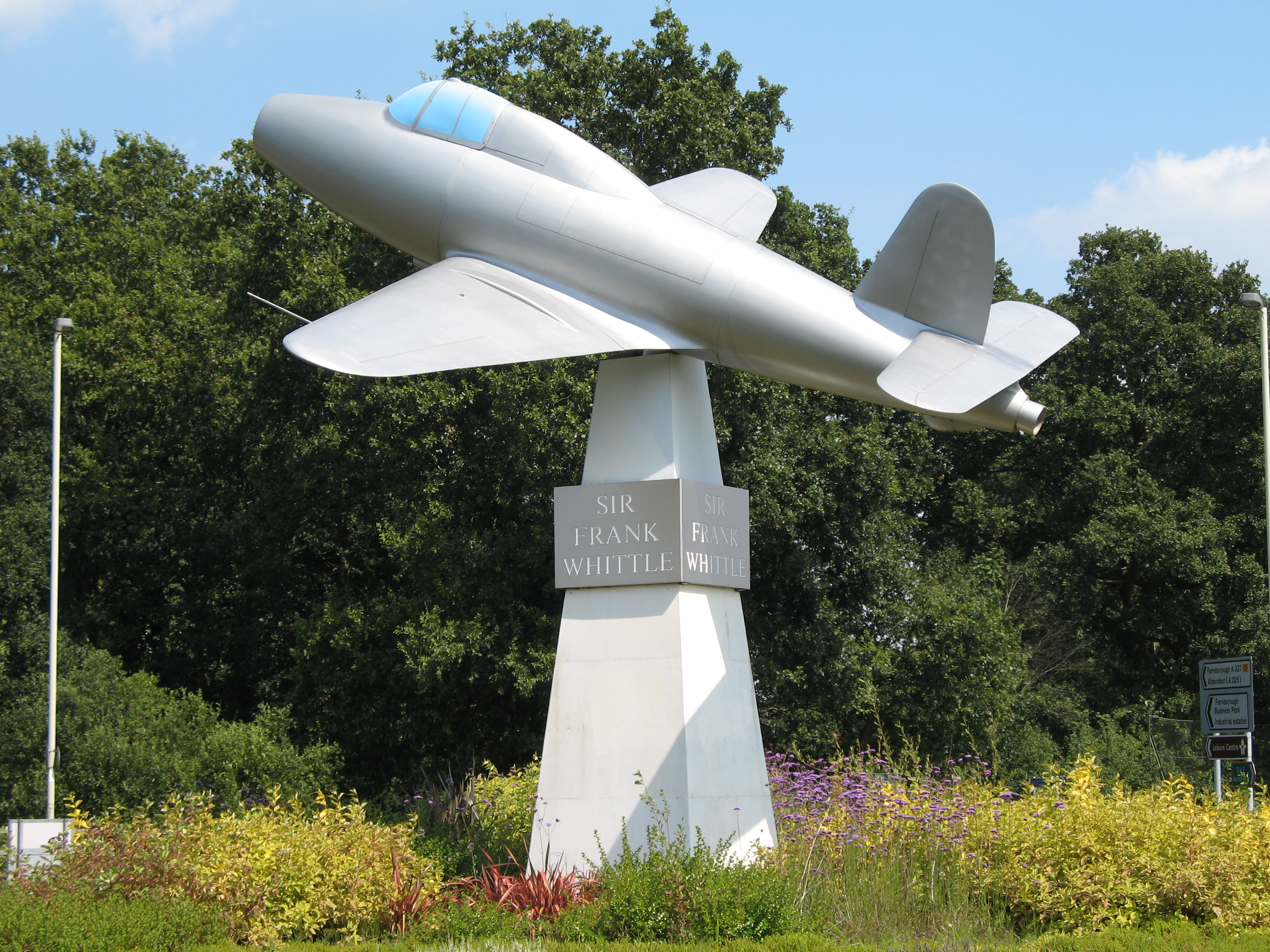
Full-scale model of the Gloster E.28/39 displayed as a gate guardian recalling the early days of the airfield as a research establishment

After TAG took control of the airport from the MOD, it invested in a series of new infrastructure projects, including a new radar unit and a resurfaced runway. The most striking new constructions were a new control tower, a large hangar unit, and finally a brand new terminal building that opened in 2006, all designed by Reid Architecture and Buro Happold. The designs won a series of awards, and were nominated for Building of the Year by Building magazine in 2007. The terminal was formally opened by the then Prince Andrew.

== Operations ==
Activity at the airport has grown from a low level in 1989 to around 30,000 movements in 2018. The airport is home to a number of the UK's largest business jet companies, including Gama Aviation, Executive Jet Charter and Bookajet.

Farnborough Airport sees the bulk of its traffic from conventional business jets. The airport is also popular with operators of larger aircraft, such as the Boeing BBJ and Airbus A319CJ; however, the use of these types is heavily restricted, with nothing larger than a BBJ2 permitted except during the airshow.

The airport's only scheduled services are private and are operated by BAE Systems, whose headquarters are nearby: it operates an Embraer 135 on a regular shuttle service to Warton Aerodrome. BAE also operates a Beechcraft King Air 200 to Walney Island. This service runs 1–4 times a day Monday–Friday.

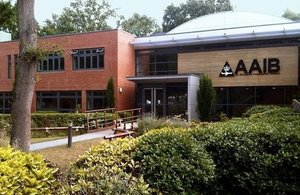
Air Accidents Investigation Branch head office

Farnborough Airport was the operations base for Citelynx, now defunct.

The Air Accidents Investigation Branch has their head office in Farnborough House, located in a compound within Farnborough Airport. The Rail Accident Investigation Branch has their southern office on the same property, next to AAIB.

== Incidents and accidents ==
During the Farnborough Airshow on 6 September 1952 the prototype de Havilland DH.110 Sea Vixen crashed. Following a demonstration of its ability to break the sound barrier, the aircraft disintegrated, killing 31 people, including the crew of two: test pilot and record breaker John Derry and Tony Richards. This incident led to major changes to the safety regulations for air shows in the UK.

During the 4 September 1984 show, a de Havilland Canada DHC-5 Buffalo was destroyed when it struck Runway 25 during landing after a steep short-final descent while demonstrating its STOL capabilities to spectators and customers. The nose-gear collapsed, followed by failure of the wing spar on both sides near the fuselage, both propellers shedding blades and the wrecked aircraft skidding to a halt on the runway. The two crew and one passenger survived the crash; nobody else was injured. The accident was attributed to pilot error, with gusty wind conditions as a major factor.

== Opposition to airport expansion ==
The airport was originally restricted to 28,000 movements each year, of which no more than 2,500 were permitted at weekends. In October 2005, TAG applied to Rushmoor Borough Council to have the weekend limit raised. The application was initially refused, but allowed by the Government on appeal in March 2008 after a Public Inquiry. A further application for an increase in the overall limit to 50,000 movements per annum was refused by Rushmoor Borough Council in 2009 and an appeal against this refusal was heard in May 2010. In February 2011 the joint Secretaries of State decided to uphold the planning appeal and allow 50,000 annual movements, phased in until 2019. The neutrality of the government was questioned by the Green Party of England and Wales after Eric Pickles, local government minister, attended a lobbying dinner where TAG chief executive, Brandon O'Reilly was present.

Opposition to the business airport has been chronicled by Blackwater Environmental Justice, and Farnborough Aerodrome Residents Association (FARA) was formed by the local community to oppose the airport expansion.

The annual movement in 2010 were 23,511 and had risen to 23,944 by 2014. However, in February 2014 TAG Farnborough applied for controlled airspace to allow business jets to operate at lower levels as far as the South Downs to allow greater predictability for its clients. Opponents of this proposal state that a far larger number of other flights will then divert into a hazardous bottle-neck to the west, causing a serious risk of collisions, increased noise and increased emissions of carbon dioxide. The closing date for comments on TAG's proposal was extended, after TAG failed to record and acknowledge anything for five days. The Civil Aviation Authority granted the controlled airspace in July 2018, though its implementation was delayed until 2020 by an unsuccessful application by Lasham Gliding Society for a judicial review. By 2018, total annual movements at the airport were 29,958.

== Aviation enthusiast scheme ==
To promote a closer working relationship with local aviation enthusiasts, Hampshire Police established an Aviation/Airport Watch Scheme. Originally run by the airport operator, this is now run under the auspices of Project Pegasus.Members can chat with representatives of TAG Aviation and are entitled to special entry to the Farnborough Air Show.

== See also ==
- Airports of London - Wikipedia
