= Federal Bureau for Maritime Casualty Investigation =

Coordinates: 53.546683°N 9.967453°E

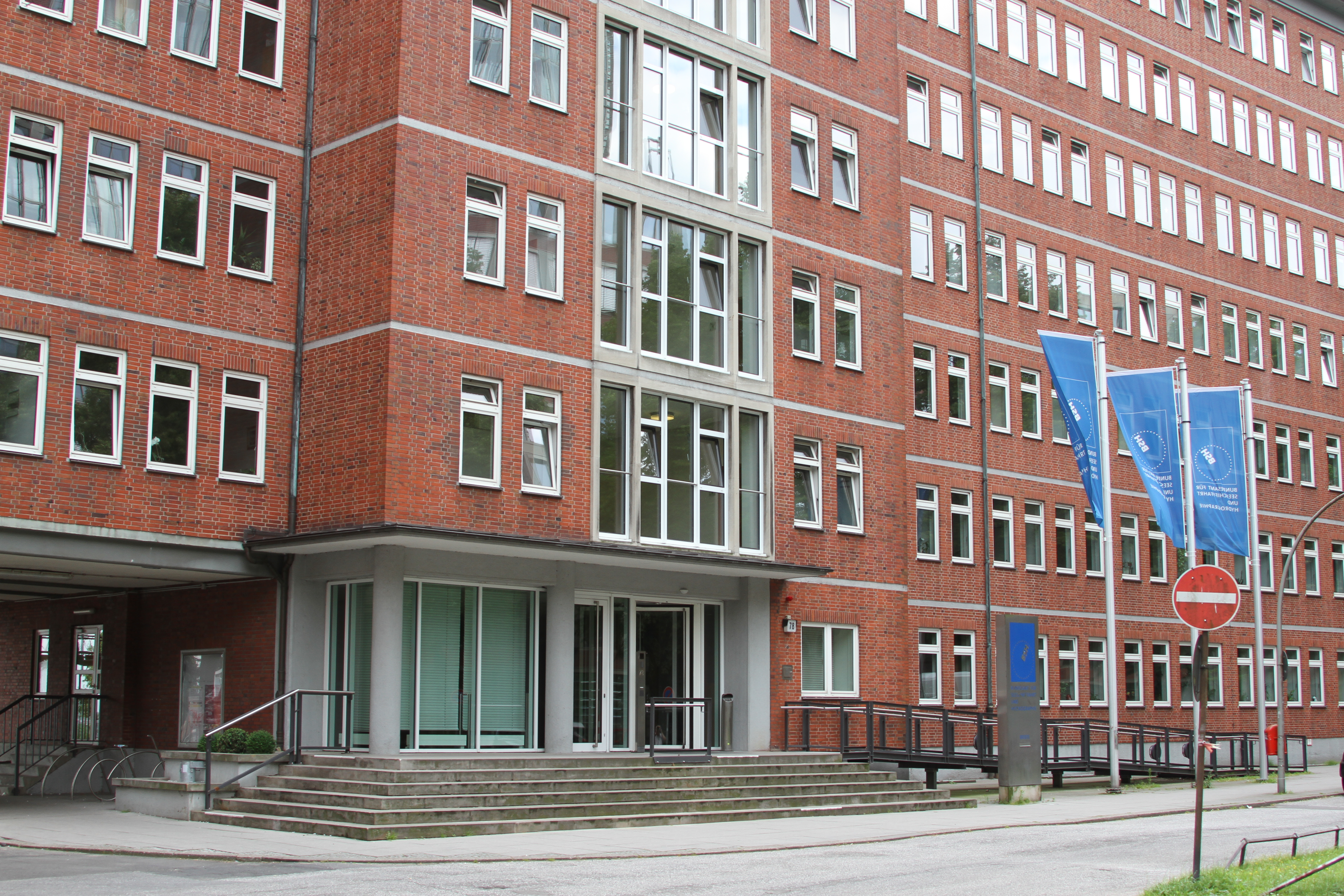
BSU head office in the Federal Maritime and Hydrographic Agency of Germany facility in Hamburg

The Federal Bureau for Maritime Casualty Investigation (German: Bundesstelle für Seeunfalluntersuchung, BSU) is the German agency for investigating maritime accidents and incidents. It is subordinate to the Federal Ministry of Transport, Building and Urban Development. Its head office is in the Federal Maritime and Hydrographic Agency of Germany (BSH) facility in St. Pauli, Hamburg-Mitte, Hamburg.

The office also investigates marine environmental-related incidents, such as incidents of oceanic pollution or incidents which cause a risk of pollution.

== See also ==
- German Federal Bureau of Aircraft Accident Investigation
- Federal Authority for Railway Accident Investigation
- Bureau d'Enquêtes sur les Événements de Mer
- Marine Accident Investigation Branch
- National Transportation Safety Board
