= Jozef Ráž (politician) =

Slovak politician (born 1979)

Minister of Transport
- Incumbent
- Assumed office 25 October 2023
- Prime Minister: Robert Fico
- Preceded by: Pavol Lančarič

Personal details
- Born: 17 July 1979 (age 47) Bratislava, Czechoslovakia
- Children: 2

Jozef Ráž (born 17 July 1979) is a Slovak politician. He currently serves as the minister of Transport.

== Early life ==
The son of namesake singer Jozef Ráž, he was born on 17 July 1979 in Bratislava. Ráž studied international business at the University of Economics in Bratislava and law at the Bratislava University of Law.

== Career ==
After graduation, Ráž had a career in civil service. Between 2005 and 2010 he worked at the ministry of defense. In 2010 he joined the Slovenská pošta, where he became a board member. In 2016 the director of Slovenská pošta Tomáš Drucker became the health minister and made Ráž his chief of staff. Ráž held the position until 2018, when his name was put forward by the prime minister Peter Pellegrini for the position of the interior affair minister. Nonetheless, the president Andrej Kiska refused the nomination over Ráž's links to the former minister Robert Kaliňák accused of power abuse and ties to organized crime.

Following his rejection, Ráž withdrew from public life and focused on running his catering business.

In 2023, Ráž became the minister of transportation.

== Personal life ==
Ráž is married with two daughters.
