= Road Safety Investigation Branch =

British road crash investigation body

The Road Safety Investigation Branch (RSIB) is a proposed road safety investigation organisation announced by the government of the United Kingdom in June 2022. The RSIB will provide independent safety recommendations based on thematic analysis of road accidents, and will provide insights into evolution of road safety policy in response to new technologies such as self-driving vehicles, e-scooters and electric vehicles.

== History and context of creation ==
In the Autumn of 2018, a Road Collision Investigation Project was started to study causes of road traffic collisions and their impact and assess business case for a Road Collision Investigation Branch..

In October 2021, the Department for Transport (DfT) launched a consultation on the establishment of a Road Collision Investigation Branch (RCIB).

The UK has accident investigation organisations for air, maritime and rail accidents, but no independent body to investigate road incidents and their causes, while in Great Britain road collisions account for more fatalities than other modes of transport. Hitherto, investigations in the road sector were limited to a Collision Reporting and Sharing System (CRASH) and to Forensic Collision Investigation reports and Prevention of Future Death. (See also Reported Road Casualties Great Britain)

On 29 June 2022, Baroness Vere of Norbiton announced governmental intention of primary legislation for the creation of the Road Safety Investigation Branch (RSIB). Creation of the announced body will rely on proposals being brought forward in a future Transport bill.

== Mission ==
The branch shall investigate thematics in the causes of crashes and also specific incidents to learn safety lessons. Independent safety recommendations shall be provided to government and police forces.

It can also analyze safety trends in new or evolving technologies such as automated vehicles, e-scooters and electric vehicles.

To achieve such a mission, the body might use data from insurance companies, vehicle manufacturers, the emergency services and the NHS.

== See also ==
- Other British accident investigation organizations
  - Office of Rail and Road
  - Air Accidents Investigation Branch - Responsible for the investigation of air accidents in the United Kingdom and UK Overseas Territories, as well as ones and involving British aircraft and those of overseas territories in international waters
  - Rail Accident Investigation Branch - Responsible for the investigation of rail accidents in the United Kingdom
  - Marine Accident Investigation Branch
- Equivalent road agencies
  - French Land Transport Accident Investigation Bureau
  - United-States
    - National Transportation Safety Board
    - National Highway Traffic Safety Administration
