= Luftfahrt-Bundesamt =

National civil aviation authority of Germany

- Luftfahrt-Bundesamt
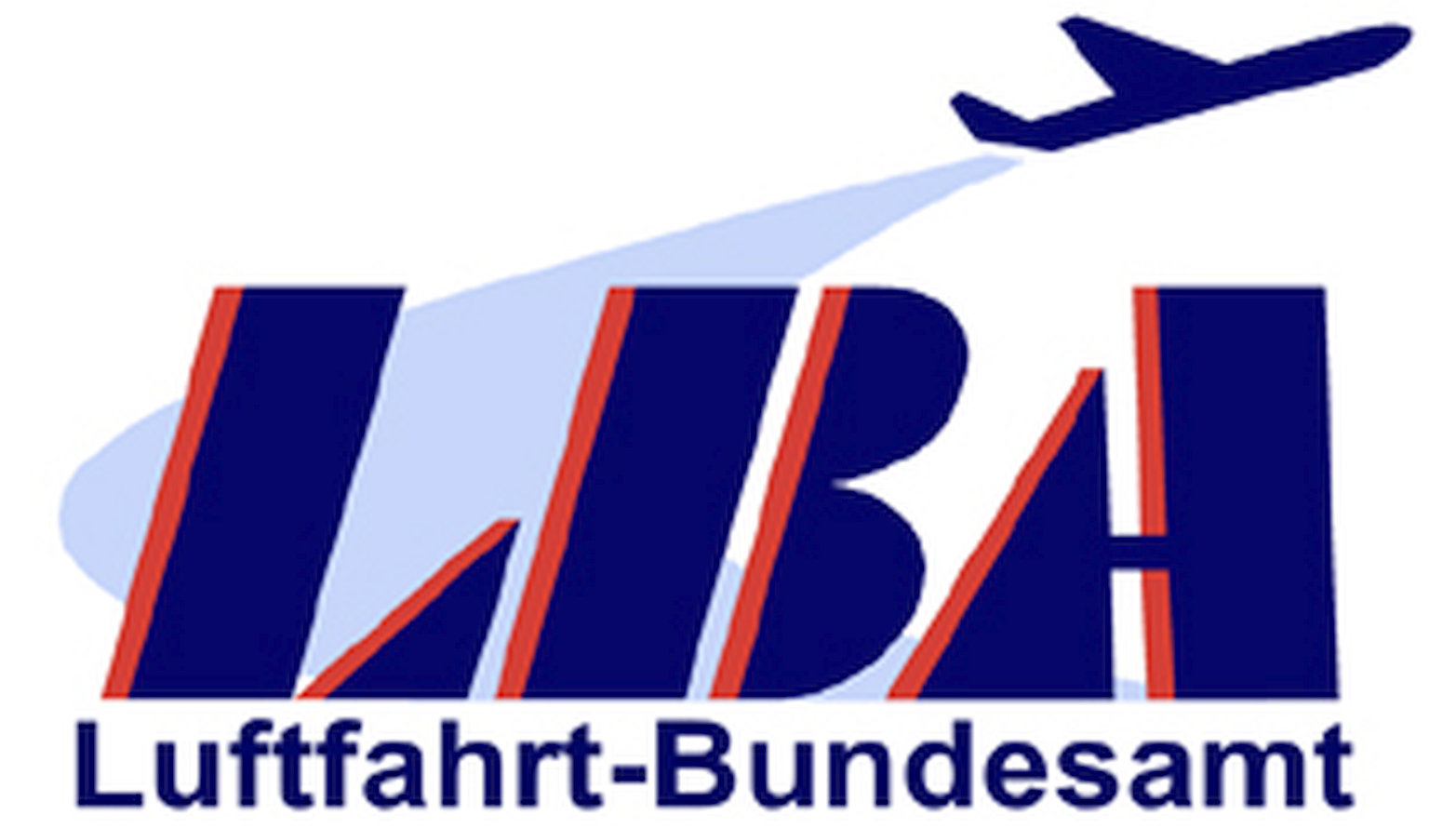

Civil Aviation Authority overview
- Formed: February 1, 1955
- Preceding agencies: Reichsluftamt; Vorläufige Bundesstelle für Luftfahrtgerät und Flugunfalluntersuchung
- Type: Executive agency
- Jurisdiction: Germany
- Status: Active
- Headquarters: Braunschweig, Germany; 52.3145°N 10.5488°E
- Parent department: Federal Ministry of Transport and Digital Infrastructure
- Key document: Gesetz über das Luftfahrt-Bundesamt (Act on the Luftfahrt-Bundesamt)
- Website: www.lba.de

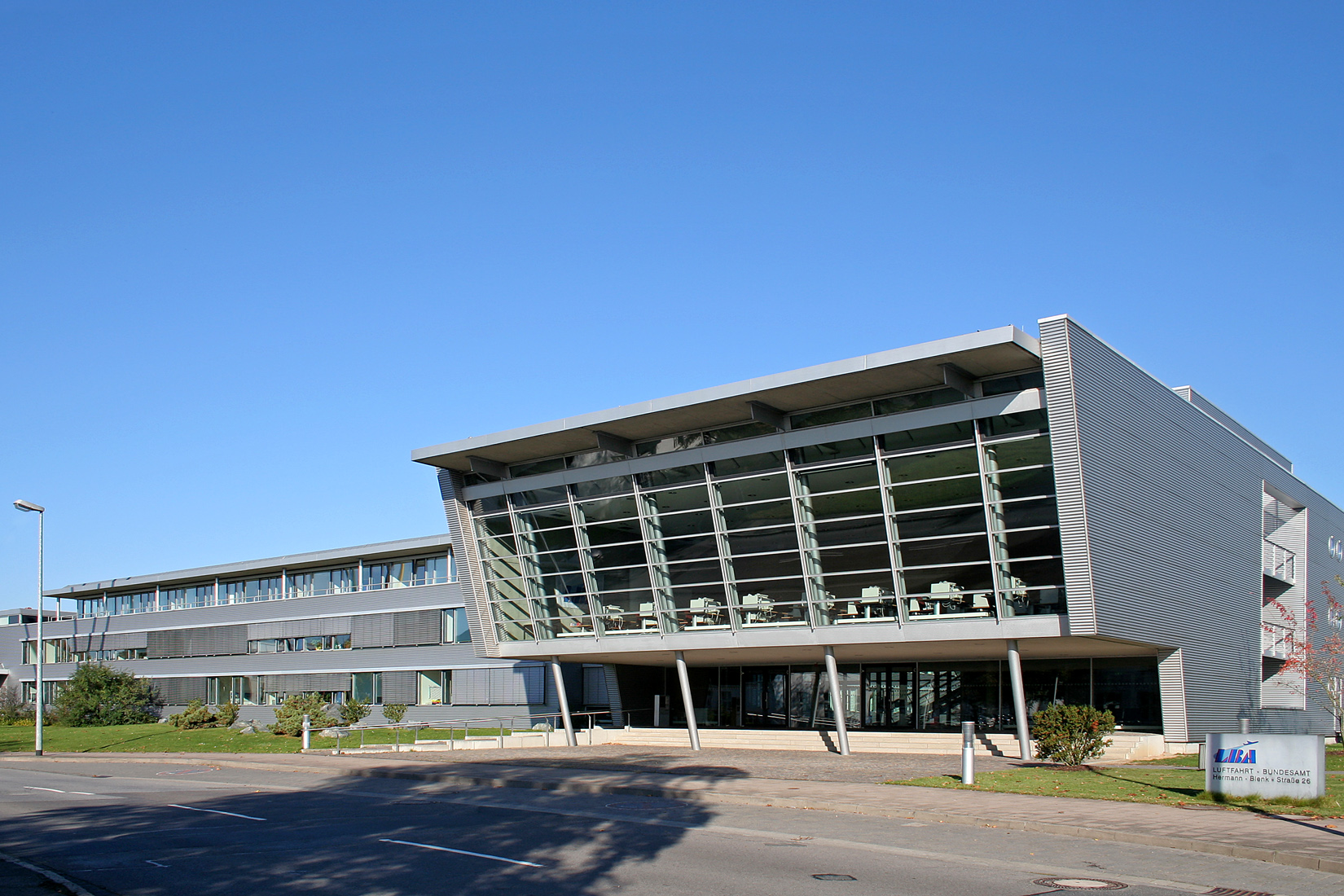
Headquarters of the Luftfahrt-Bundesamt

The Luftfahrt-Bundesamt (LBA, "Federal Aviation Office") is the national civil aviation authority of Germany headquartered in Braunschweig.

It maintains regional offices in Düsseldorf, Frankfurt am Main (Raunheim), Hamburg, Munich (Airport), Stuttgart, and Berlin and reports directly to the Federal Ministry of Transport and Digital Infrastructure.

The LBA is responsible for developing and maintaining aviation safety standards, as well as certifying airlines, airports, and training devices such as simulators and flight training devices (FTDs). Some of these tasks are fulfilled on behalf of the European Aviation Safety Agency (EASA). Investigation of accidents is not a responsibility of the LBA but of the German Federal Bureau of Aircraft Accident Investigation.

== History ==
In 1918, when the Weimar Republic had been established, matters of aviation were provisionally assigned to the Reichsamt des Inneren (Imperial Ministry of the Interior). In 1918, the Reichsluftamt (Imperial Agency of Aviation) was established.

After World War II, matters of aviation were initially handled by the administration of the Allied occupation powers. Some matters of aviation were transferred to the '"Vorläufige Bundesstelle für Luftfahrtgerät und Flugunfalluntersuchung'" (Provisional Federal Office for Avionic Devices and Investigation of Aviation Accidents) established on 15 September 1953 in Bonn. Eventually, the Luftfahrt-Bundesamt was established by the Gesetz über das Luftfahrt-Bundesamt (Act on the Luftfahrt-Bundesamt) of 30 November 1954 (BGBl. I 354) and commenced operation on 1 February 1955.

In East Germany, the Hauptverwaltung der Zivilen Luftfahrt (Central Administration for Civil Aviation) was established on 1 January 1961. It was replaced by the Staatliche Luftfahrt-Inspektion der DDR (Public Department of Aviation of the GDR) on 1 January 1968, from which the Luftfahrt-Bundesamt took over all operations and most of the staff on 4 October 1990, the day after German re-unification.

On 28 September 2003, substantial competences were formally transferred to the European Aviation Safety Agency established by Regulation (EC) 1592/2002.

== Criticism ==
In 2024, the LBA faced criticism over lengthy delays in processing medical fitness certificates for pilots. Three major German aviation associations jointly wrote a formal letter of protest to Federal Minister of Transport Volker Wissing, stating that comparable processing times were "completely unknown" in other European countries and that pilots had in some cases waited "months or years" for their certificates. Lufthansa stated that grounded pilots awaiting decisions were costing the airline millions of euros. Critics also warned that the delays paradoxically undermined flight safety, as pilots were reportedly reluctant to disclose health problems for fear of prolonged grounding.
