= Agenzia Nazionale per la Sicurezza delle Ferrovie =

Italian rail safety agency

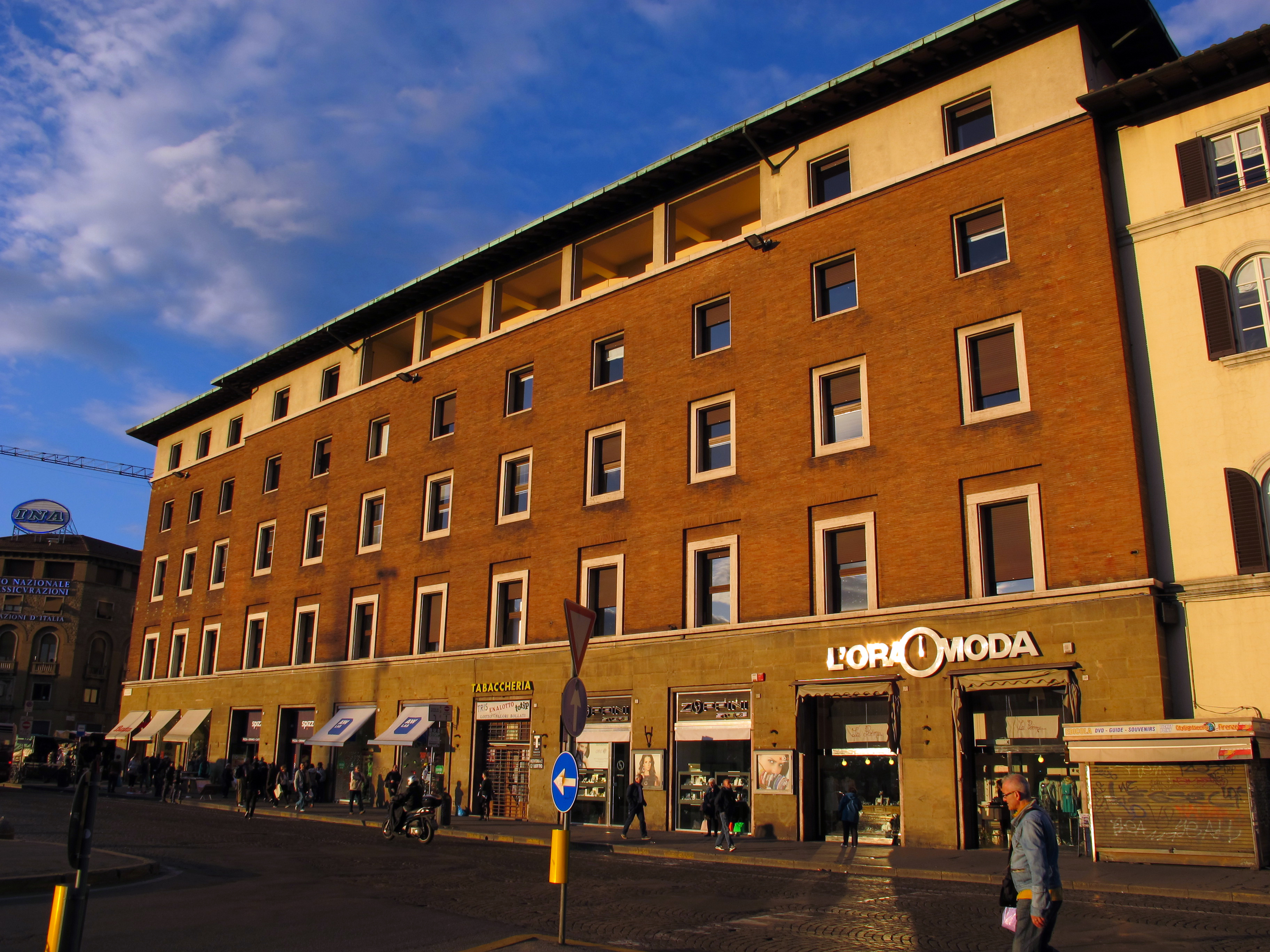
Agency headquarters

Agenzia Nazionale per la Sicurezza delle Ferrovie (ANSF; English: National Railways Safety Agency) was an Italian government agency that oversaw the safety of the country's rail system. Its head office was in Florence, within the complex of the Firenze Santa Maria Novella railway station.

On 3 November 2020, the agency was replaced by the Agenzia Nazionale per la Sicurezza delle Ferrovie e delle Infrastrutture Stradali e Autostradali (ANSFISA; English: National Railway and Highway Infrastructures Safety Agency).

== See also ==
- National Agency for the Safety of Flight – Italian air accident investigation agency
