= French Land Transport Accident Investigation Bureau =

French land transport accident investigation agency

BEA-TT has been headquartered in La Défense, seen in this image. Its current head office is the Grande Arche (centre) while it had been previously based in the Tour Pascal B (to the far left of the Grande Arche) and Tour Voltaire

The French Land Transport Accident Investigation Bureau (Bureau d'Enquêtes sur les Accidents de Transport Terrestre, abbreviated BEA-TT) is an agency of the French government formed in 2004 and charged with the investigation into accidents involving all forms of land transport, including railways, urban guided transportation systems (metros, trams), cable-hauled transport systems, road transport (heavy goods vehicles, and public transport by coach and bus), and canals and other navigable inland waterways.

== History ==
Prior to the formation of the BEA-TT, the government minister with responsibility for transportation would set up ad hoc investigation commissions, for example after the 1988 Paris-Gare de Lyon rail accident and 1999 Mont Blanc tunnel fire. These commissions were supported by the Conseil Général des Ponts et Chaussées (CGPC, "Civil Engineering General Council").

The CGPC's experience, particularly following the Mont Blanc tunnel fire, showed there was a need for a new legal framework that guaranteed investigators access to sites, recordings and information covered by commercial confidentiality or pre-trial non-disclosure agreements. An Act of parliament passed on 3 January 2002 supplied the legal basis for technical investigations and reaffirms and mandates the investigatory principals of independence, and commits to the publishing of the report. The BEA-TT was founded by a decree on 26 January 2004, with the right of access to all elements useful to an investigation, even those covered by non disclosure or confidentiality requirements such as those pre-trial or for commercial and medical reasons.

== Administrative affairs ==
Its current head office is in the Grande Arche in La Défense business district and in Puteaux.

It formerly was headquartered in the Tour Voltaire in La Défense business district and in Puteaux, and previously in the Tour Pascal B in Puteaux and La Défense.

== Investigations ==
- Brétigny-sur-Orge train crash

There is an equivalent agency in regards to state and military land transport, the Bureau enquêtes accidents défense de transport terrestre (BEAD-TT).

== See also ==
- Bureau d'Enquêtes et d'Analyses pour la Sécurité de l'Aviation Civile (BEA)
- Bureau d'Enquêtes sur les Evénements de Mer (BEAmer)
- Rail Accident Investigation Branch (United Kingdom)
- Road Safety Investigation Branch (United Kingdom)
