= National Agency for the Safety of Flight =

Italian aircraft accident investigation agency

- Italian: Agenzia Nazionale per la Sicurezza del Volo
- Seal of the Italian Republic

Agency overview
- Formed: February 25, 1999; 27 years ago
- Jurisdiction: Government of Italy
- Parent department: Ministry of Infrastructure and Transport
- Website: ansv.it

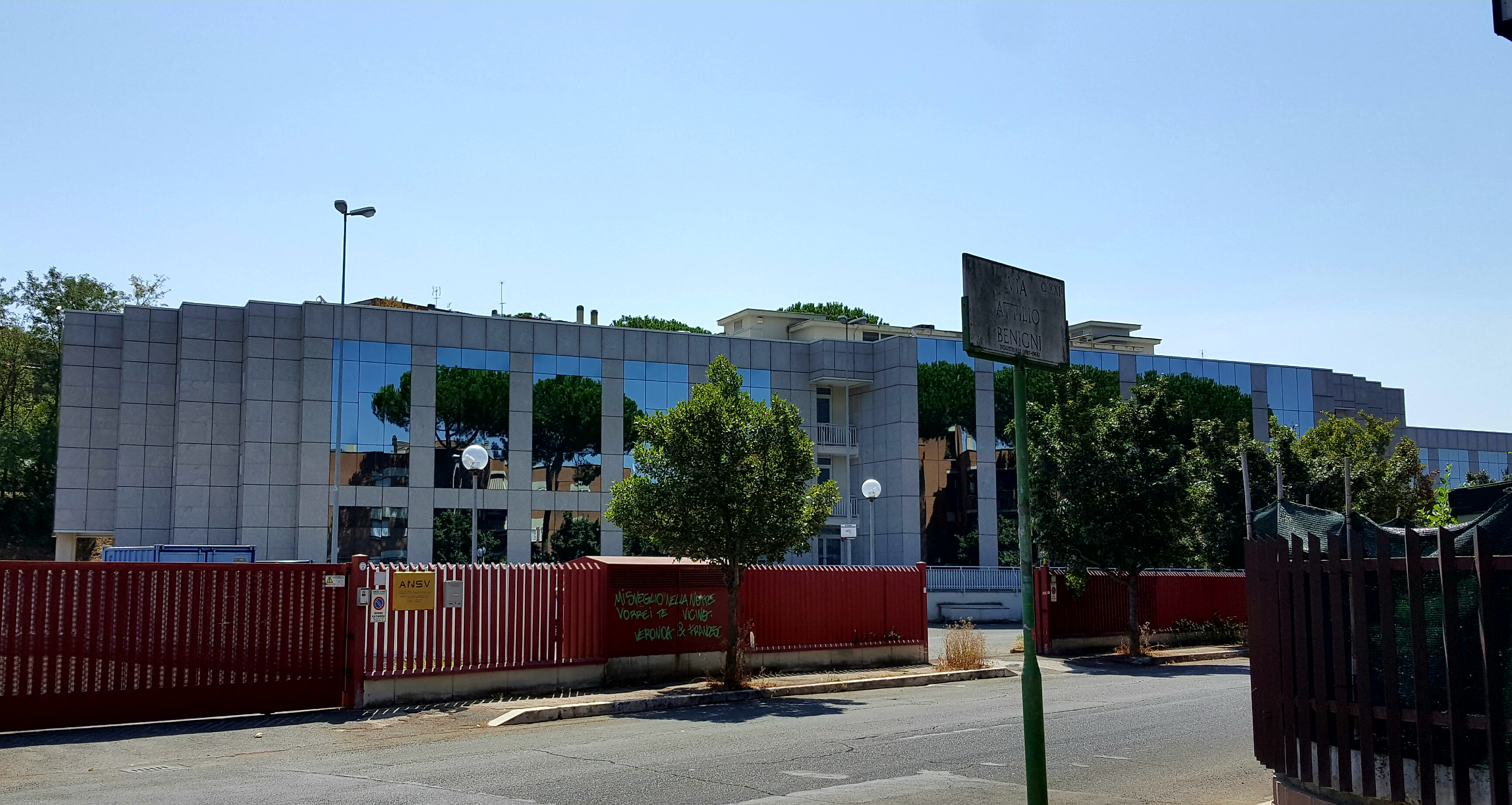
ANSV head office

The National Agency for the Safety of Flight (Italian: Agenzia Nazionale per la Sicurezza del Volo) is the Italian aviation accident investigation agency. The ANSV is headquartered in Rome. The italian Prime Minister oversees the agency.

It was established by legislative decree No. 66, 25 February 1999. Prior to the establishment of the ANSV, there would be two different investigations for each aviation accident or incident, one by the airport director and another more formal and technical investigation by an ad hoc committee appointed by the Ministry of Infrastructure and Transport. After its establishment, only one investigation has been made.

== Accidents investigated by the ANSV ==
- 2001 Linate Airport runway collision
- Tuninter Flight 1153
- Air Algérie Flight 2208
- Ryanair Flight 4102

== See also ==
- Aviation safety
- Agenzia Nazionale per la Sicurezza delle Ferrovie e delle Infrastrutture Stradali e Autostradali - Current rail and road accident investigation agency
- Agenzia Nazionale per la Sicurezza delle Ferrovie – Former rail accident investigation agency
