= Civil Aviation Authority (Slovakia) =

Government agency of Slovakia

The Civil Aviation Authority of the Slovak Republic (CAA, Slovak: Letecký úrad Slovenskej republiky, LÚ SR) is a government agency of Slovakia. Its head office is located on the property of M. R. Štefánik Airport in Bratislava.

It was established by Law 143/1998 Act of April 2, 1998 on Civil Aviation (Aviation Act) and on Amendment of Some Acts.

== See also ==
- Aviation and Maritime Investigation Authority
