= Air Accidents Investigation Branch =

UK government investigative agency for civil aviation accidents

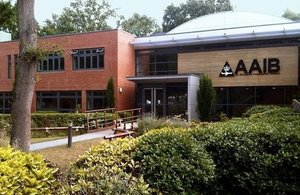
- Farnborough House, AAIB head office at Farnborough Airport

Agency overview
- Formed: 1915
- Jurisdiction: United Kingdom; British Overseas Territories; Crown Dependencies
- Headquarters: Farnborough House; Farnborough Airport, Rushmoor
- Employees: 64
- Annual budget: >£18 million
- Agency executive: Crispin Orr, Chief Inspector of Air Accidents
- Parent department: Department for Transport
- Website: www.gov.uk/government/organisations/air-accidents-investigation-branch

The Air Accidents Investigation Branch (AAIB) investigates civil aircraft accidents and serious incidents within the United Kingdom, its overseas territories and crown dependencies. It is also the Space Accident Investigation Authority (SAIA) for the United Kingdom. The AAIB is a branch of the Department for Transport and is based in the grounds of Farnborough Airport, Hampshire.

== History ==
Aviation accident investigation in the United Kingdom started in 1912, when the Royal Aero Club published a report into a fatal accident at Brooklands Aerodrome, Surrey.

The AAIB was established in 1915 as the Accidents Investigation Branch (AIB) of the Royal Flying Corps (RFC). Captain G B Cockburn was appointed "Inspector of Accidents" for the RFC, reporting directly to the Director General of Military Aeronautics in the War Office.

After the First World War, the Department of Civil Aviation was set up in the Air Ministry and the AIB became part of that department with a remit to investigate both civil and military aviation accidents.

Following the Second World War a Ministry of Civil Aviation was established and in 1946 the AIB was transferred to it, but continued to assist the Royal Air Force with accident investigations – a situation which has continued ever since.

After working under various parent ministries, including the Department of Trade, the AIB moved to the then Department of Transport in 1983 and in November 1987 its name was changed to its current form, the Air Accidents Investigation Branch (AAIB). Latterly, the AAIB has become part of the reorganised Department for Transport (DfT) since 2002. In 2024, the AAIB was awarded the Lennox-Boyd Award by the Aircraft Owners and Pilots Association.

== Organisation ==
The AAIB has 57 employees.

These are:

- Chief Inspector of Air Accidents
- Deputy Chief Inspector of Air Accidents
- Six teams of inspectors from all disciplines each led by a principal inspector

AAIB Inspectors fall into one of three categories:

- Operations inspector – must hold a current Airline Transport Pilot Licence with a valid Class I medical certificate. Able to offer appropriate command experience on fixed-wing aircraft or helicopters. Broad-based knowledge of aviation.
- Engineering inspector – must hold an engineering degree and/or be a Chartered Engineer with a minimum of five years' post qualifications experience. Knowledge and experience of modern aircraft control systems.
- Flight recorder inspector – degree level in electronics/electrical engineering or an aeronautical engineering related subject and/or is a chartered member of a relevant engineering institute with eight years' experience since qualifying. Knowledge and experience of modern avionics.

There is also a Head of Administration who is supported by two teams, the Inspector Support Unit (ISU) who provide administrative support to the principal inspectors and their teams and the Information Unit (IU), who are the first port of call for accidents being reported.

AAIB administrative staff are part of the Department for Transport (DfT) and are recruited according to civil service guidelines.

== Space Accident Investigation Authority ==
In 2021, it was announced that the AAIB had been appointed as the Space Accident Investigation Authority for the United Kingdom, in accordance with the Spaceflight Activities (Investigation of Spaceflight Accidents) Regulations 2021. Independent of the UK Space Agency, it will investigate spaceflight accidents that occur in or over the United Kingdom.

== Investigations ==
The AAIB conducts investigations defined under one of two categories; "Accident" or "Serious Incident". An "Accident" occurs where a person suffers a fatal or serious injury, the aircraft sustains damage or structural failure which adversely affects its performance, or where the aircraft is missing or inaccessible. A "Serious Incident" means an incident where an accident nearly occurred.

The AAIB is responsible for the investigation of civil aircraft accidents and serious incidents within the UK and its overseas territories. These are Anguilla, Bermuda, the British Virgin Islands, Cayman Islands, Gibraltar, the Falkland Islands, Montserrat and the Turks and Caicos Islands. A 2009 document by the AAIB stated, "In practice the majority of accidents that occur in the Territories are non-fatal and involve small aircraft. Such accidents do not normally justify a full field investigation by the AAIB."

They are also involved in overseas investigations in other countries when the accident or incident involves a British-registered or British-built aircraft or UK airline, or where their involvement is specifically requested by the investigating host nation.

== Head office ==
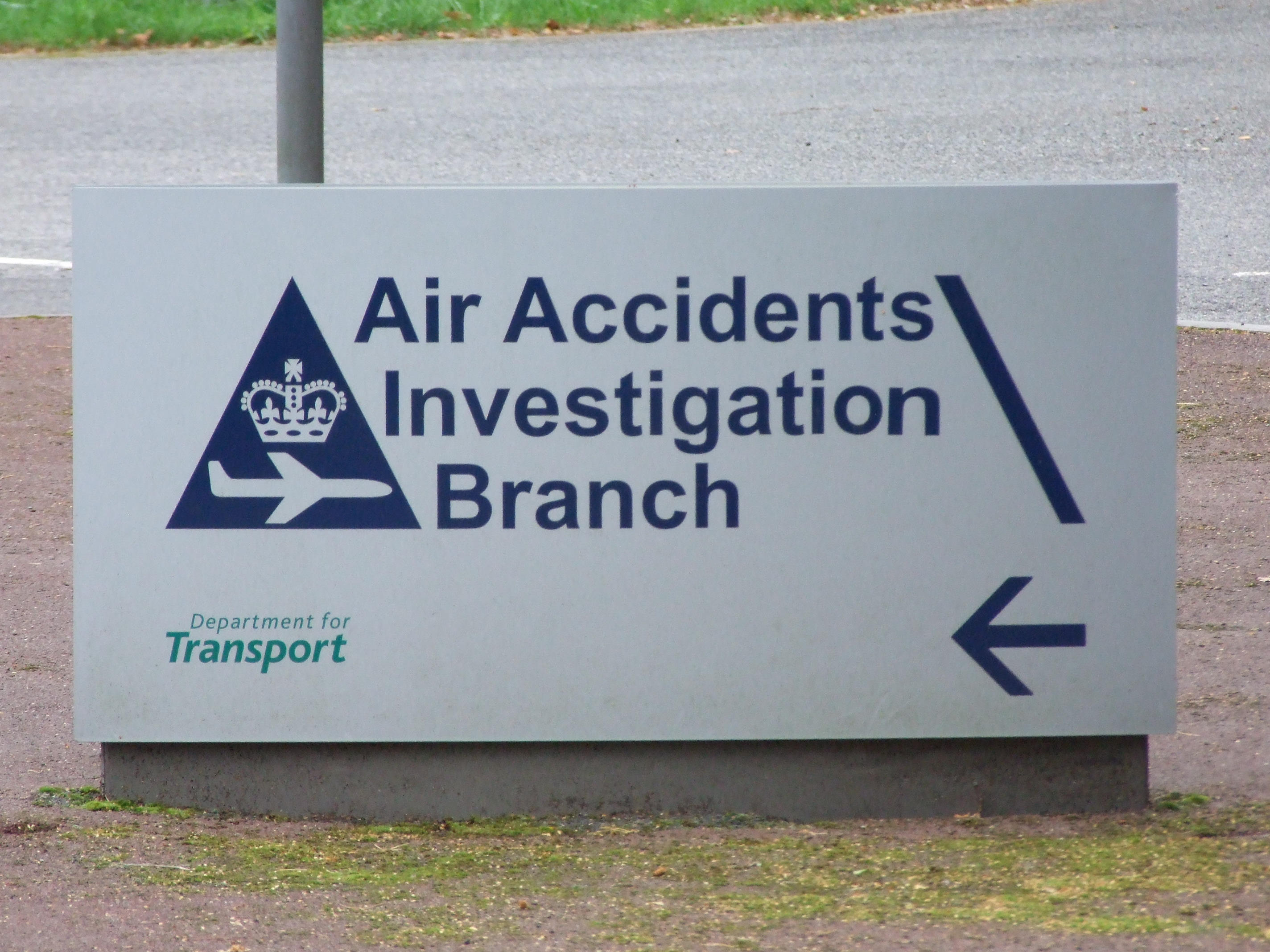
Sign leading to the entrance of Farnborough House, the AAIB head office

The Air Accidents Investigation Branch has its head office in Farnborough House, a building that is a part of a compound within the boundary of Farnborough Airport, located between Aldershot and Farnborough, within the borough of Rushmoor. The approximately 1.75-hectare (4.3-acre) head office site, which houses three large buildings and car park facilities, is in a lightly wooded area south of the main runway of Farnborough Airport. The buildings at the AAIB site include an (as of 2005) L-shaped, two-storey flat roof office building and a hangar. The original buildings were from the 1970s. Lana Design supervised the construction of a 4,700-square-metre (51,000 sq ft) two-storey new addition to the main building. It includes offices, acoustic laboratories and a lecture theatre. The addition had a cost of £2.6 million.

The AAIB site is south of the airfield and east of the Puckeridge Ammunition Depot, and it is located near the Basingstoke Canal. Cove Brook, about 150 metres (500 ft) south of the AAIB head office, runs from the south to the north. The AAIB head office is accessible from Berkshire Copse Road, which dissects through the length of the AAIB head office site. The Borough of Rushmoor stated that the AAIB complex "requires a secluded" and "secure" location due to "the nature of its operation."

Previously the AAIB head office was in Shell Mex House on the Strand in the City of Westminster, London.

== See also ==
Other United Kingdom accident investigation bodies

- Military Aviation Authority
- Marine Accident Investigation Branch
- Rail Accident Investigation Branch
- Road Safety Investigation Branch
- Aviation safety
- List of accidents and incidents involving military aircraft
- List of accidents and incidents involving airliners in the United Kingdom
- Air Accident Investigation Unit – Ireland
- National Transportation Safety Board – United States
- Transportation Safety Board of Canada – Canada
- International Board for Research into Air Crash Events
