= Agenzia Nazionale per la Sicurezza delle Ferrovie e delle Infrastrutture Stradali e Autostradali =

Italian transport safety agency

- Italian: Agenzia Nazionale per la Sicurezza delle Ferrovie e delle Infrastrutture Stradali e Autostradali
- Logo of the Agency with Seal of the Italian Republic

Agency overview
- Formed: September 28, 2018; 8 years ago
- Jurisdiction: Government of Italy
- Agency executive: Domenico Capomolla, director
- Parent department: Ministry of Infrastructure and Transport
- Website: ansfisa.gov.it

Agenzia Nazionale per la Sicurezza delle Ferrovie e delle Infrastrutture Stradali e Autostradali (ANSFISA) is the rail and road transport safety agency of Italy, headquartered in Rome. It is an agency of the Ministry of Infrastructure and Transport.

It is the successor of the former Agenzia Nazionale per la Sicurezza delle Ferrovie. Since 11 April 2023 its director is engineer Domenico Capomolla.

== History ==
The Agency was established through Legislative Decree no. 109-2018, converted with amendments by Law no. 130-2018, replacing the Agenzia Nazionale per la Sicurezza delle Ferrovie (ANSF), of which it absorbed all the human, instrumental and financial resources. On 30 November 2020 it became totally operational.

On 1 January 2022, in compliance with Legislative Decree no. 121-2021, converted with amendments by Law no. 156-2021, it absorbed the skills, resources and staff of the six Special Offices for Fixed-Plant Transport (USTIF).

== See also ==
- Road Safety Investigation Branch - Proposed United Kingdom road safety agency
