= Rail Accident Investigation Branch =

British government agency

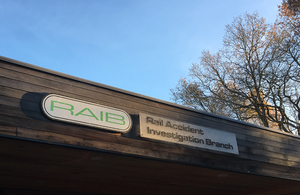
- Cullen House, office of the RAIB at Farnborough Airport
- Formation: 17 October 2005
- Type: Government Agency
- Location(s): Derby Farnborough Airport
- Region served: United Kingdom
- Chief Inspector: Andrew Hall
- Staff: 43
- Website: www.gov.uk/government/organisations/rail-accident-investigation-branch

The Rail Accident Investigation Branch (RAIB) is a British government agency that independently investigates rail accidents in the United Kingdom and the Channel Tunnel in order to find a cause, not to lay blame. Created in 2005, it is required by law to investigate accidents causing death, serious injuries or extensive damage. It also has authority to investigate incidents that could have resulted in accidents.

== Creation and remit ==
The Cullen Report into the Ladbroke Grove rail crash in 1999 recommended the establishment of an accident investigation body within the Department for Transport along the same lines as the Marine Accident Investigation Branch and the Air Accidents Investigation Branch, bodies that have distinguished themselves by their professionalism and objectivity.

During 2003, Parliament legislated – in the Railways and Transport Safety Act 2003 – to create the RAIB as an independent body charged solely with establishing the facts of the case and assessing and evaluating causes, but not apportioning blame or establishing liability; nor does the RAIB enforce safety law or conduct prosecutions. The RAIB became operational on 17 October 2005; Carolyn Griffiths served as its founding director.

Before the creation of the RAIB, railway accidents were investigated by His Majesty's Railway Inspectorate (which in 1990 became part of the Health and Safety Executive but is now part of the Office of Rail and Road), and the British Transport Police (if there were grounds for suspecting the commission of a crime). Whilst the police must always be involved when there may have been a crime, the involvement of HMRI as the principal safety investigating agency attracted criticism on the grounds that the HSE might be investigating itself, if, for example, the HSE had approved a track layout or a signalling scheme later suspected to have been at fault.

The RAIB also satisfied the government's duty under European Union legislation (the European Railway Safety Directive 2004/49/EC) to provide an independent body that investigates rail incidents and accidents in a blame-free manner.

The RAIB has its remit laid down in law by The Railways (Accident Investigation and Reporting) Regulations 2005, which principally require the branch to investigate any accident or dangerous occurrence that results in:

- The death of at least one person;
- Serious injury to five or more people; or
- Extensive damage to rolling stock, the infrastructure or the environment.

The RAIB has authority to investigate any incident on the following railway transport systems, but especially investigates those that may have implications for railway safety or those that "...under slightly different circumstances, may have resulted in an accident":

- The national railway networks in the United Kingdom including Northern Ireland;
- The Channel Tunnel (in co-operation with its equivalent operation in France, the French Land Transport Accident Investigation Bureau);
- The London Underground, Glasgow Subway and other metro systems;
- Tramways;
- Heritage railways (including narrow-gauge systems over 350 mm [14 in] gauge); and
- Cable-hauled systems of 1 km (0.62 miles) or longer.

== Operation ==
The agency has two operational centres: one in Derby (The Wharf) and the other in the Farnborough/ Aldershot area, at Farnborough Airport. The Farnborough/Aldershot centre is Cullen House, adjacent to the Air Accidents Investigation Branch head office.

Previously, its southern office was in Woking, Surrey. The move from Woking to Farnborough was scheduled for 2012.

The Chief Inspector and Deputy Chief Inspector operate out of both Derby and Farnborough offices. Each office has two inspectorate teams and its own operational support staff.

== Notable incidents investigated by the RAIB ==
- Grayrigg derailment, 23 February 2007;
- Barrow upon Soar rail crash, 1 February 2008;
- Channel Tunnel fire, 11 September 2008 (joint investigation with the French Land Transport Accident Investigation Bureau);
- Falls of Cruachan derailment, 6 June 2010;
- Little Cornard derailment, 17 August 2010;
- Wootton Bassett rail incident, 7 March 2015;
- Croydon tram derailment, 9 November 2016;
- Lewisham train strandings, 2 March 2018;
- Stonehaven derailment, 12 August 2020;
- Llangennech derailment, 26 August 2020;
- Kirkby train crash, 13 March 2021;
- Salisbury rail crash, 31 October 2021;
- Talerddig train collision, 21 October 2024;
- Shap derailment, 3 November 2025 (investigation in progress, initial report issued in November 2025);
- Bedford train collision, 19 June 2026 (investigation in progress);
- Lewes derailment, 13 August 2026 (investigation in progress).

== See also ==
- Road Safety Investigation Branch
- Railway Accident Investigation Unit, the corresponding body for the Republic of Ireland
