= Federal Authority for Railway Accident Investigation =

Federal authority in Germany

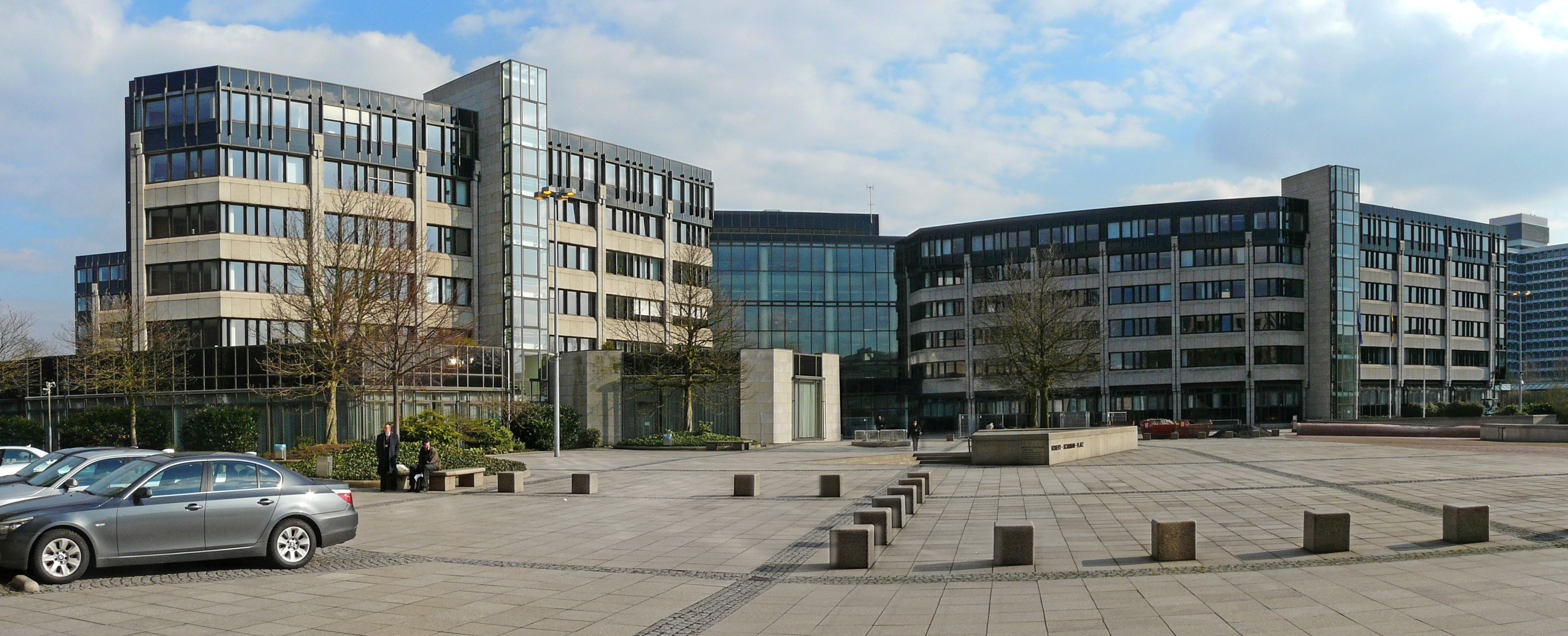
The BMVI offices in Bonn had the head office of the EUB.

The Federal Authority for Railway Accident Investigation (German: Bundesstelle für Eisenbahnunfalluntersuchung, BEU) is an agency of the Government of Germany established in 2017 and charged with investigating rail accidents. Its head office is in Bonn.

The predecessor was the Eisenbahn-Unfalluntersuchungsstelle des Bundes (EUB), which was headquartered in the Federal Ministry of Transport and Digital Infrastructure (BMVI) Robert-Schuman-Platz 1 office building in Bonn.

== See also ==
- Federal Bureau for Maritime Casualty Investigation
- German Federal Bureau of Aircraft Accident Investigation
