= German Federal Bureau of Aircraft Accident Investigation =

German aviation federal agency

Coordinates: 52°18′51″N 10°33′11″E

- Bundesstelle für Flugunfalluntersuchung

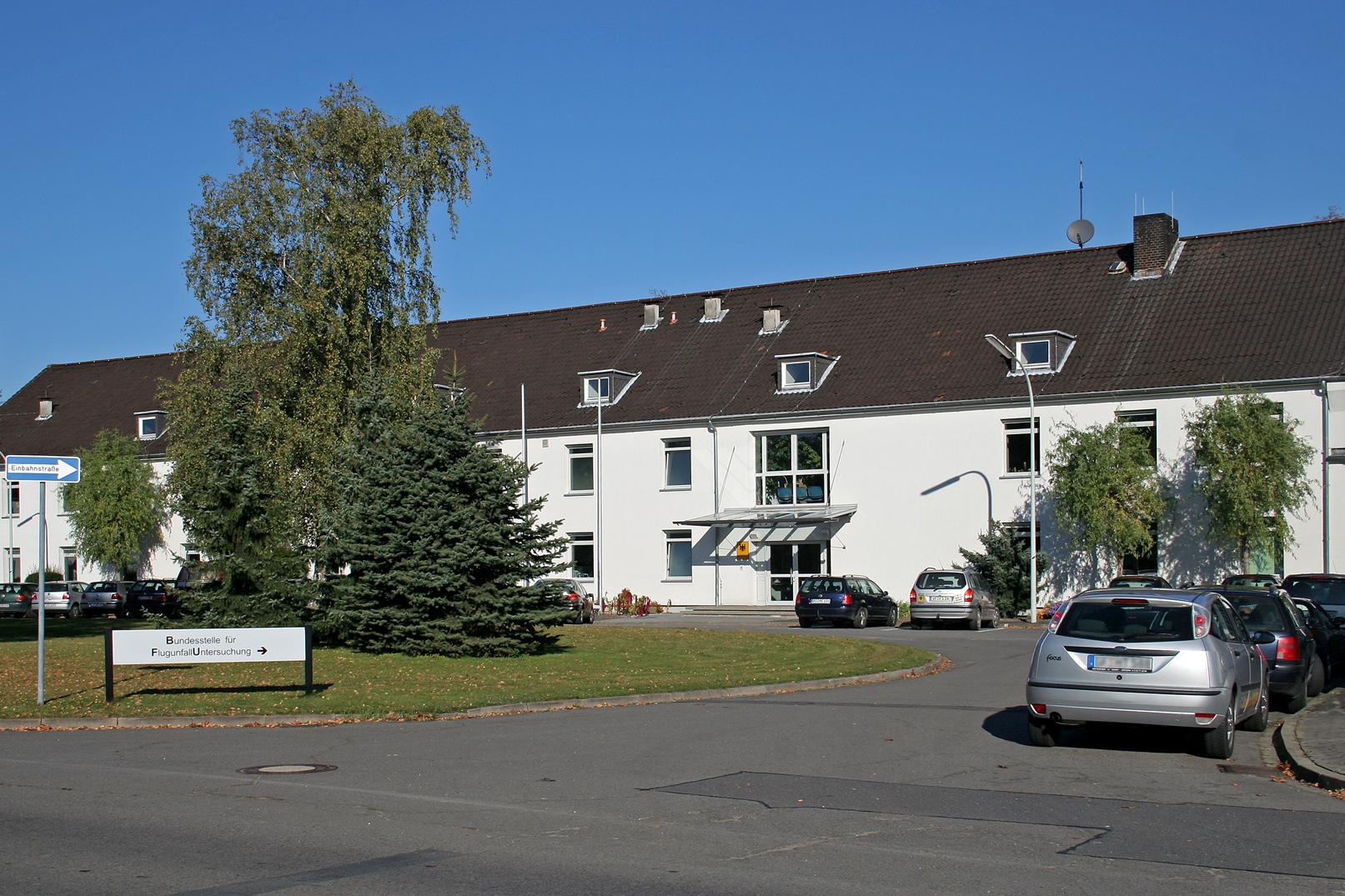
- BFU building, Braunschweig Airport
- Abbreviation: BFU
- Formation: 1 September 1998; 28 years ago
- Type: Federal agency
- Legal status: Established by Law on the Investigation of Accidents and Malfunctions in Operation of Civil Aircraft
- Purpose: Aviation accident and incident investigation
- Headquarters: Braunschweig
- Region served: Germany
- Official language: German
- Director: Ulf Kramer
- Website: www.bfu-web.de

The German Federal Bureau of Aircraft Accident Investigation (German: Bundesstelle für Flugunfalluntersuchung, BFU) is the German federal agency responsible for air accident and incident investigation.

The purpose of BFU is to determine the causes of air accidents and incidents and how they can be prevented. The BFU facility is located in Braunschweig, Lower Saxony. The agency is subordinate to the Federal Ministry for Transport.

West Germany joined the Convention on International Civil Aviation including the standards and recommended practices on aircraft accident and incident investigation (Annex 13) in 1956. Initially subordinate to the neighbouring Luftfahrt-Bundesamt (Federal Aviation Office), the Bureau of Aviation Accident Investigation according to a recommendation by the International Civil Aviation Organization in 1980 was put under the direct authority of the Federal Ministry of Transport. The BFU was formally established as an upper-level federal agency in 1998.

== See also ==
- Aviation accidents and incidents
- Aviation safety
- Federal Authority for Railway Accident Investigation
- Federal Bureau for Maritime Casualty Investigation
