= Aviation and Maritime Investigation Authority =

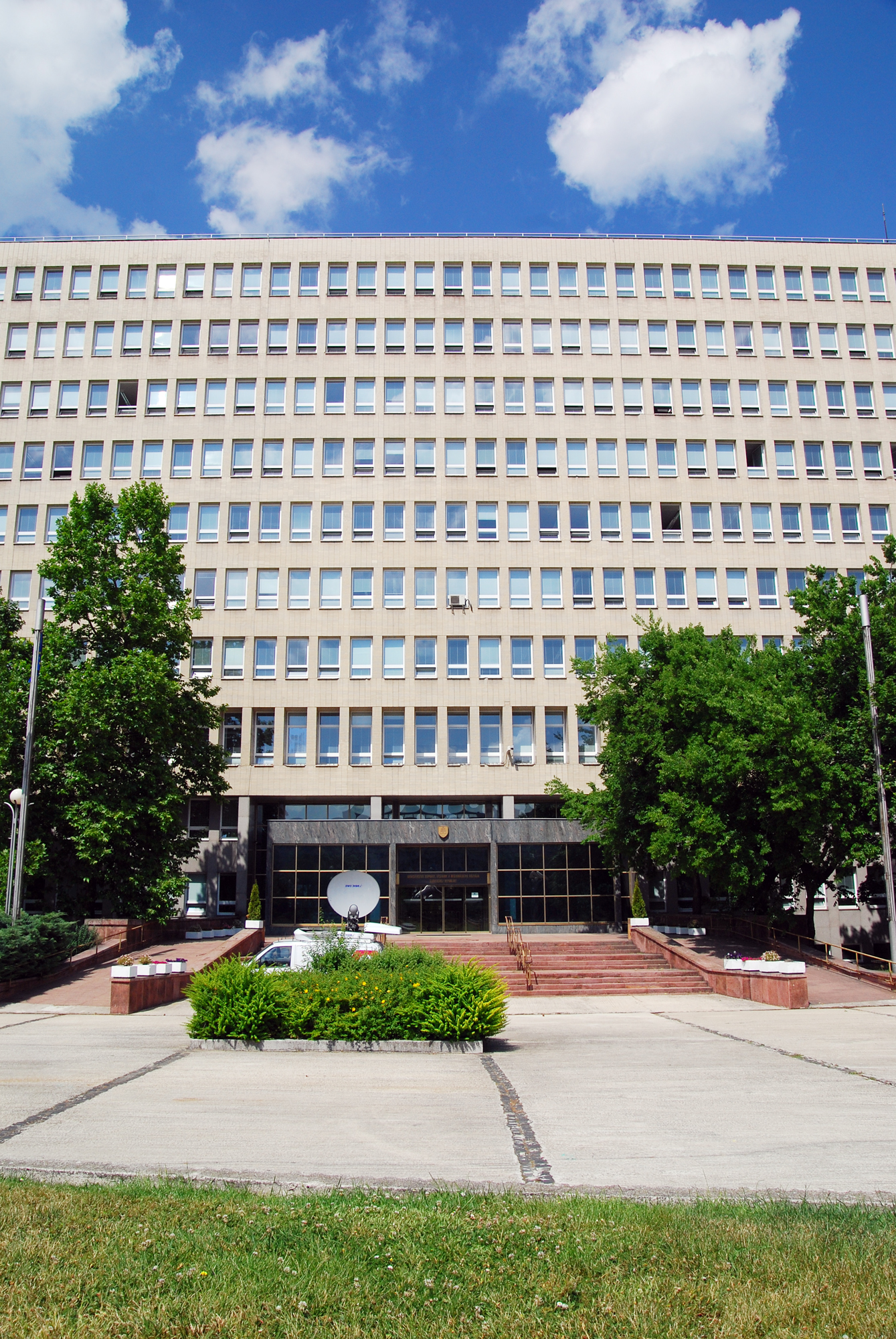
Head office of the Ministry of Transport, Construction, and Regional Development, which houses the AMIA head office

The Aviation and Maritime Investigation Authority (AMIA, Slovak: Letecký a námorný vyšetrovací útvar, LNVÚ) is the accident and incident investigation authority of Slovakia for aviation and nautical matters. It is an independent part of the Ministry of Transport, Construction, and Regional Development. Its head office is in the Ministry of Transport offices in Bratislava.

Previously, the Civil Aviation Inspectorate Slovak Republic (Štátna letecká inšpekcia SR) conducted investigations on aviation accidents and incidents.

== See also ==
- Civil Aviation Authority (Slovakia)
