= Aviation accidents and incidents =

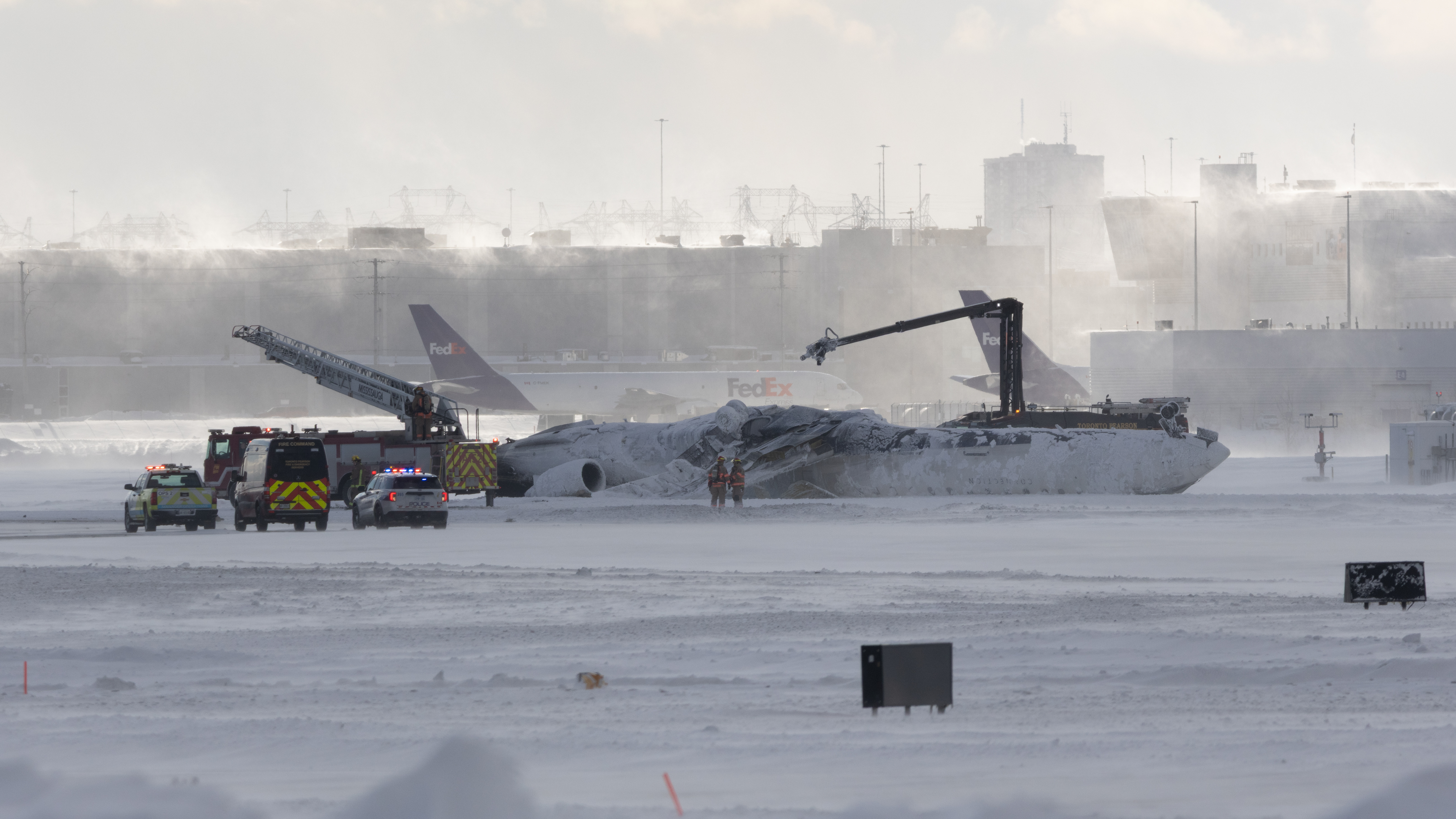
A Bombardier CRJ900, operating as Delta Connection Flight 4819, after it crashed upon landing at Toronto Pearson International Airport on February 17, 2025

An aviation accident is an event during aircraft operation that results in serious injury, death, or significant destruction. An aviation incident is any operating event that compromises safety but does not escalate into an aviation accident. Preventing both accidents and incidents is the primary goal of aviation safety.

The most common causes of these accidents and incidents are technical or mechanical failures of the aircraft and pilot error. Adverse weather conditions, including turbulence, thunderstorms, icing, and low visibility, have also historically been major contributing factors in aviation accidents and incidents worldwide.

Since civil aviation became widespread in the mid-20th century, hundreds of incidents have occurred every year, with most being minor and non-fatal.

== Definitions ==
According to Annex 13 of the Convention on International Civil Aviation, an aviation accident is an occurrence associated with the operation of an aircraft, which takes place from the time any person boards the aircraft with the intention of flight until all such persons have disembarked, and in which (a) a person is fatally or seriously injured, (b) the aircraft sustains significant damage or structural failure, or (c) the aircraft goes missing or becomes completely inaccessible. Annex 13 defines an aviation incident as an occurrence, other than an accident, associated with the operation of an aircraft that affects or could affect the safety of operation.

A hull loss occurs if an aircraft is damaged beyond repair, is lost, or becomes completely inaccessible.

== History ==
One of the earliest recorded aviation accidents occurred on May 10, 1785, when a hot air balloon crashed in Tullamore, County Offaly, Ireland. The resulting fire seriously damaged the town, destroying over 130 homes.

The first accident involving a powered aircraft and the first involving an airplane occurred on September 17, 1908, when a Wright Model A crashed at Fort Myer, Virginia, USA. The pilot and co-inventor, Orville Wright, was injured, and the passenger, Signal Corps Lieutenant Thomas Selfridge, was killed.

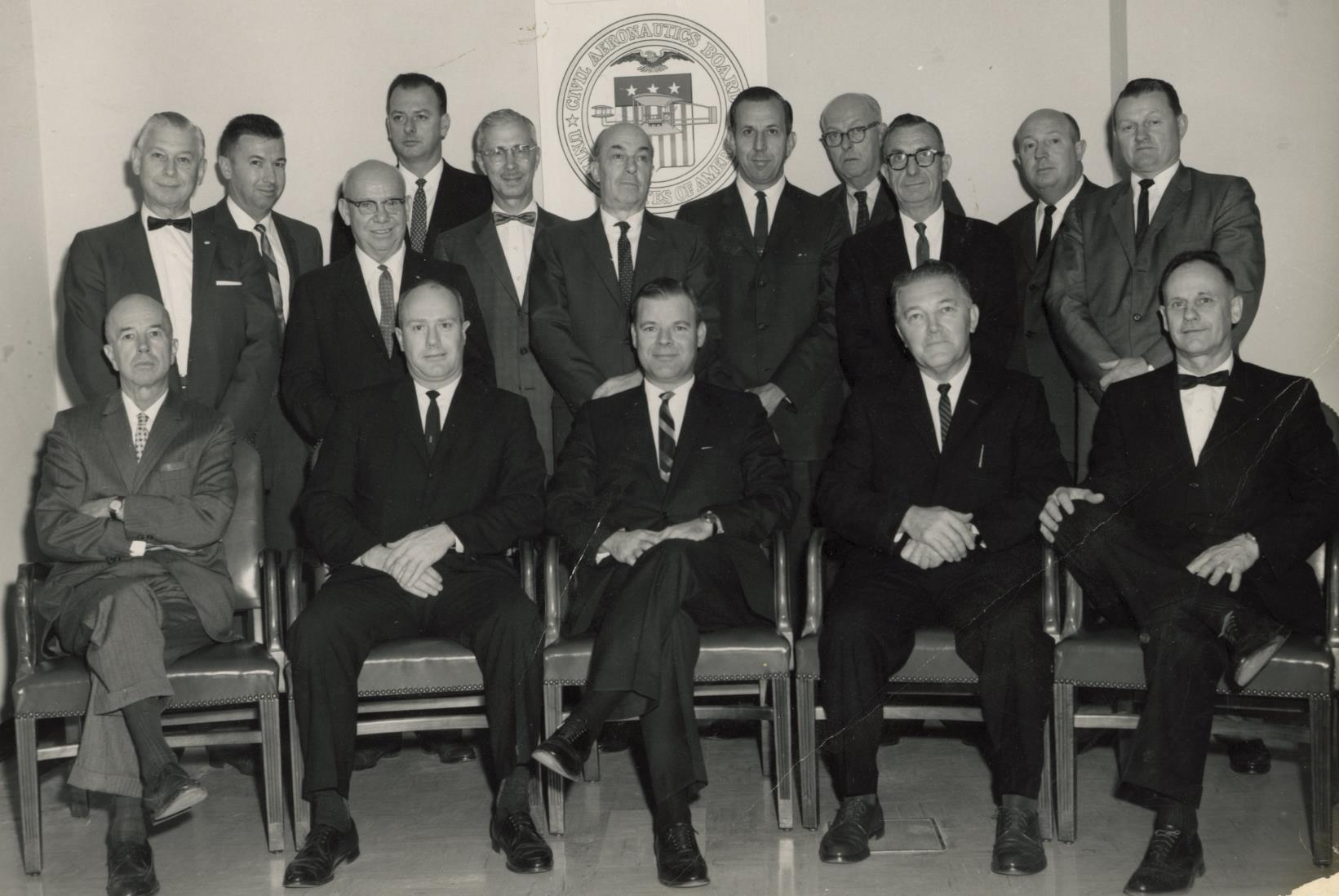
Accident Investigation Team from the Civil Aeronautics Board with Director, Bobbie R. Allen – about 1965

The period from 1958 to 1968 saw tremendous growth in aviation. Improvements in aviation safety and accident investigation procedures were rapidly advancing. In 1963, the Civil Aeronautics Board, under the leadership of then Deputy Director Bobbie R. Allen, established the National Aircraft Accident Investigation School in Oklahoma City.

The ICAO's third accident investigation division meeting, held in Montreal, Canada, in January 1965, laid the foundation for accident investigations throughout the world. The proposals were presented by the Director of the Civil Aeronautics Board Bureau of Safety, Bobbie R. Allen, who headed the U.S. delegation. The U.S. formally adopted the proposals at the White House on December 1, 1965.

The top 10 countries with the highest number of fatal civil airliner accidents from 1945 to 2021 are the United States, Russia, Canada, Brazil, Colombia, United Kingdom, France, Indonesia, Mexico, and India. The United Kingdom is noted to have the highest number of air crashes in Europe, with a total of 110 air crashes within the time period, and Indonesia is the highest in Asia at 104, followed by India at 95.

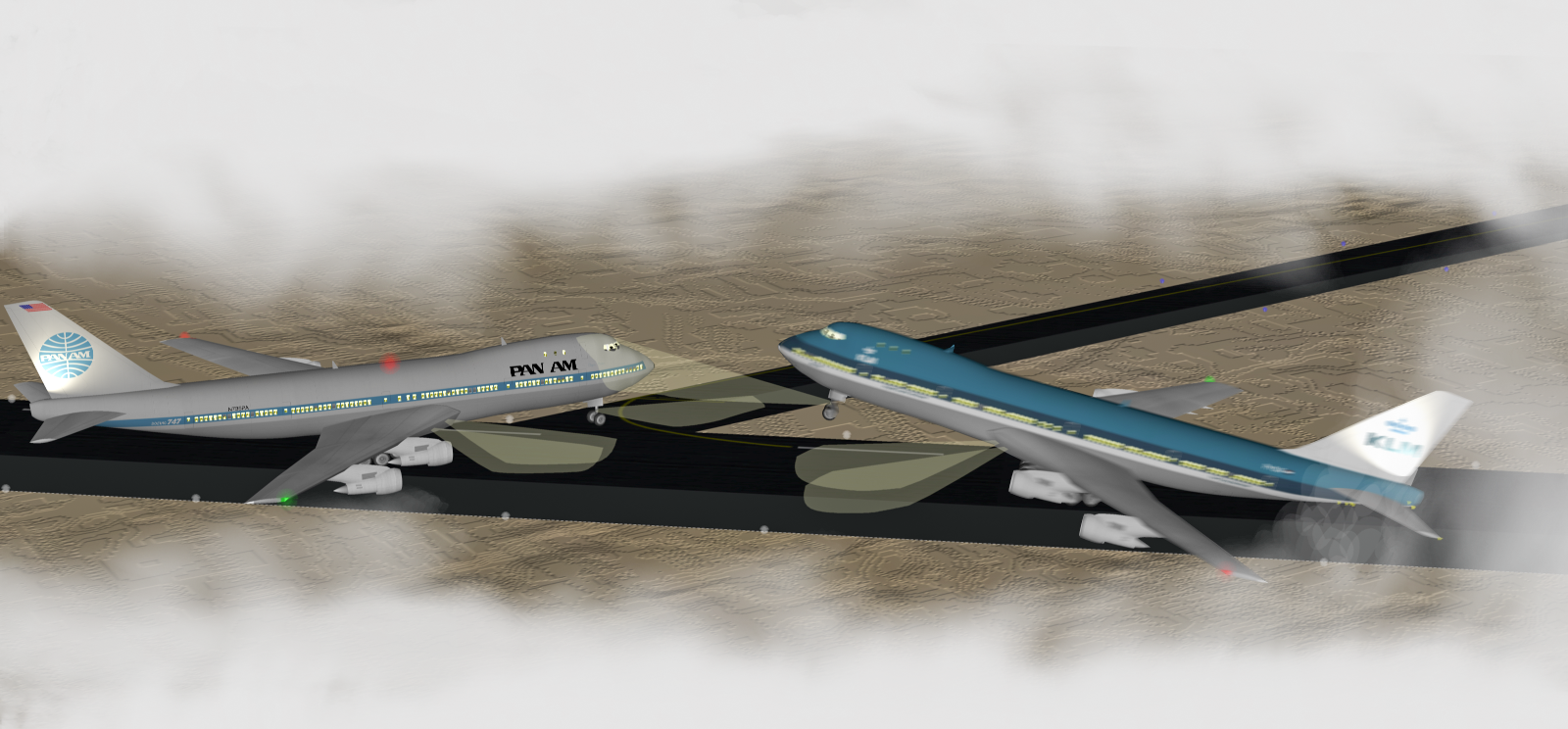
Computer graphics reconstruction of the moment immediately before the disaster: KLM Flight 4805 (right) is about to collide with Pan Am Flight 1736 (left). Part of the fog has been removed to give a clearer picture of the two planes.

The 1970s decade saw the most fatalities from civil aviation accidents and the highest total number of them. The 1977 Tenerife airport disaster, in which two Boeing 747s collided, resulted in the largest loss of life in a single aviation accident, with 583 fatalities.

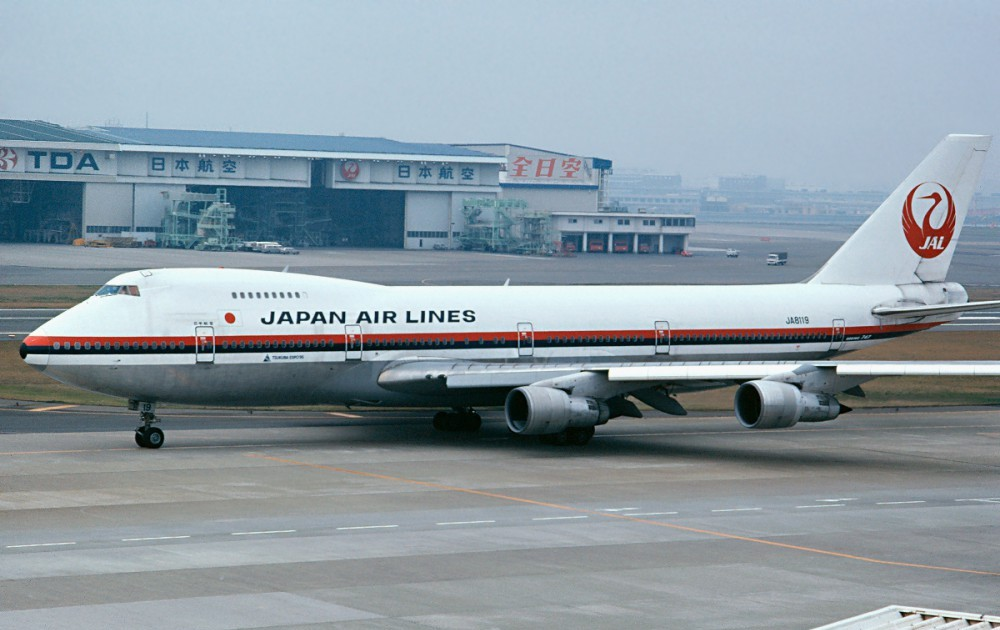
JA8119, the Boeing 747 involved in Flight 123

The rate of fatal accidents declined significantly from the early 1960s to the 1980s, falling by nearly 50% in ICAO-member countries during that period of time. However, the 1980s saw many high-profile crashes. 1985 was the worst year for aviation in terms of death toll from accidents. This includes the crash of Japan Airlines Flight 123, which is the deadliest aviation accident involving a single aircraft, excluding intentional crashes.

The rate of fatal aviation accidents involving airliners continued to decline worldwide through the 1990s. In the United States, deregulation generally did not impede this trend.

== Safety ==
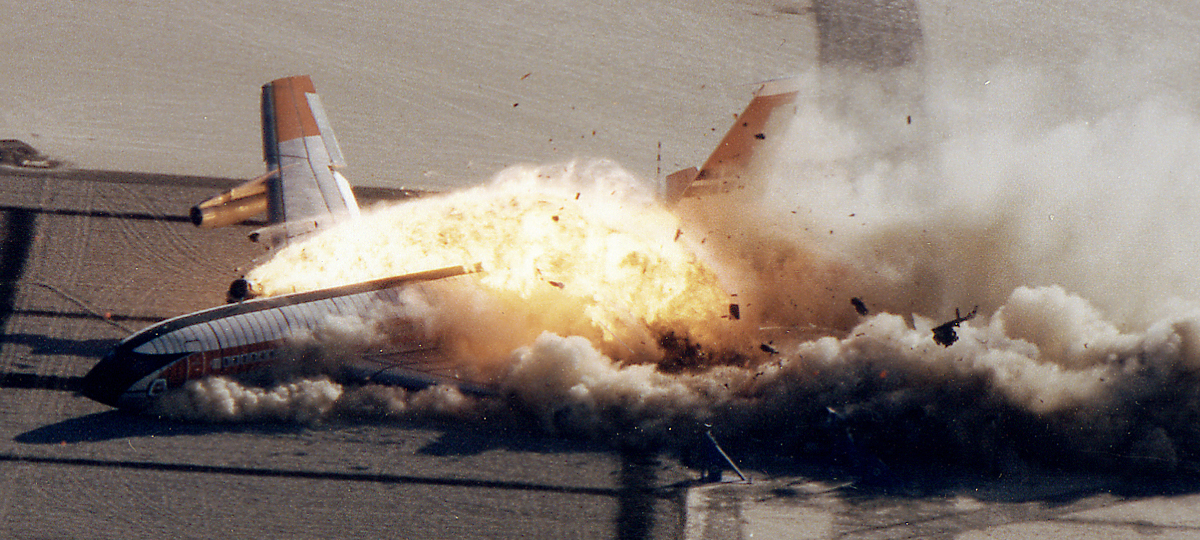
Controlled Impact Demonstration by NASA and the FAA, December 1984

In over one hundred years of implementation, aviation safety has improved considerably. In modern times, two major manufacturers still produce heavy passenger aircraft for the civilian market: Boeing in the United States, and the European company Airbus. Both of these manufacturers place a huge emphasis on the use of aviation safety equipment, now a billion-dollar industry in its own right; safety is a key selling point for these companies, as they recognize that a poor safety record in the aviation industry is a threat to corporate survival.

Some major safety devices now required in commercial aircraft are:

- Evacuation slides, to aid rapid passenger exit from an aircraft in an emergency situation
- Advanced avionics, incorporating computerized auto-recovery and alert systems
- Turbine engines with improved durability and failure containment mechanisms
- Landing gear that can be lowered even after loss of power and hydraulics

Measured on a passenger-distance calculation, air travel is the safest form of transportation available. The BBC states, "UK airline operations are among the safest anywhere. When compared against all other modes of transport on a fatality per mile basis, air transport is the safest – six times safer than travelling by car and twice as safe as rail."

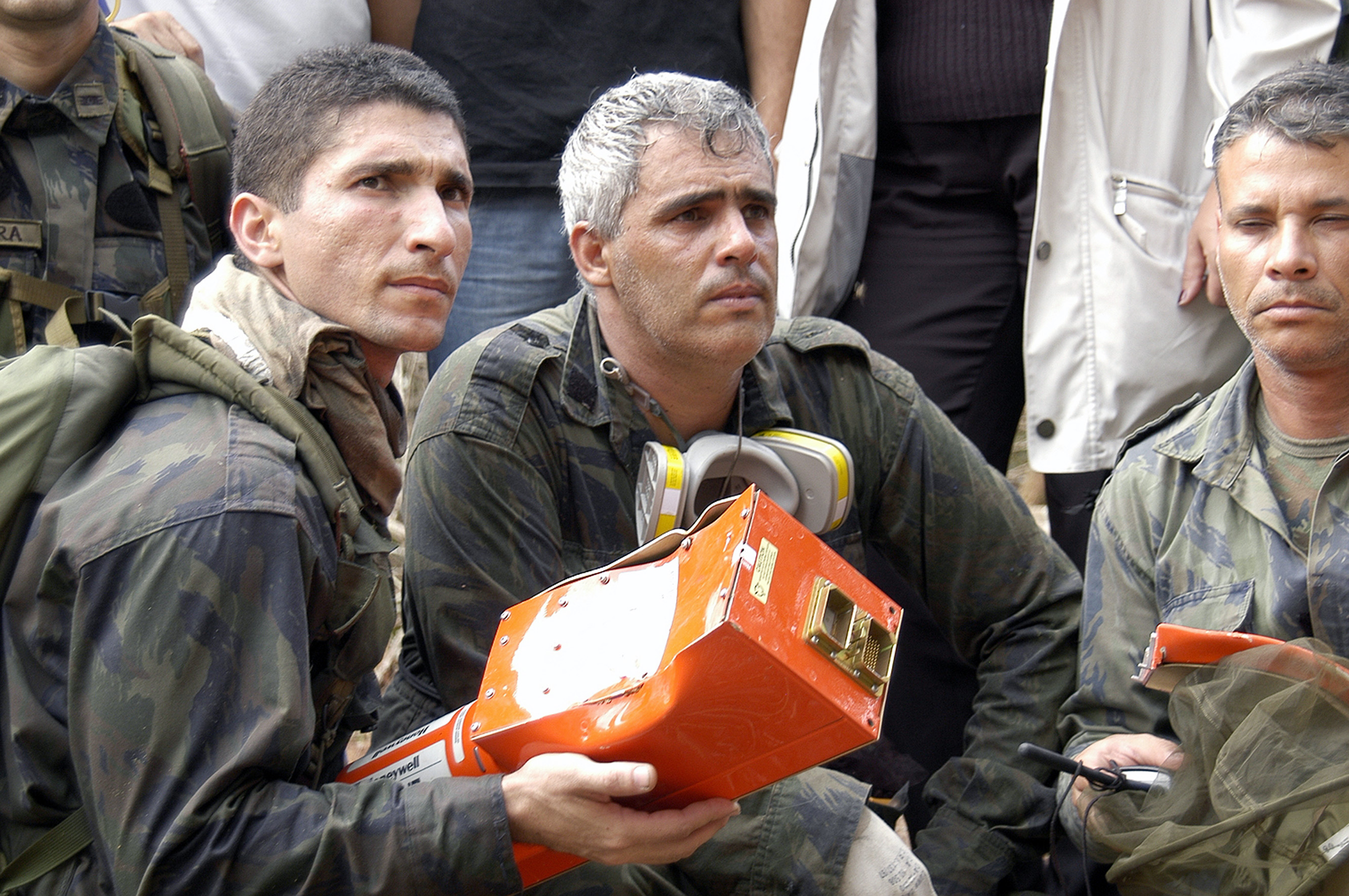
Brazilian Air Force personnel recover the flight data recorder of Gol Transportes Aéreos Flight 1907, which crashed on September 29, 2006.

When measured by fatalities per person transported, however, buses are the safest form of transportation. The number of air travel fatalities per person are surpassed only by bicycles and motorcycles. This statistic is used by the insurance industry when calculating insurance rates for air travel.

For every billion kilometers traveled, trains have a fatality rate that is 12 times higher than that of air travel, and the fatality rate for automobiles is 62 times greater than for air travel. By contrast, for every billion journeys taken, buses are the safest form of transportation; using this measure, air travel is three times more dangerous than car transportation, and almost 30 times more dangerous than travelling by bus.

A 2007 study by Popular Mechanics magazine found that passengers sitting at the back of an aeroplane are 40% more likely to survive a crash than those sitting at the front. The article quotes Boeing, the FAA, and a website on aircraft safety, all of which claim that there is no "safest" seat. The study examined 20 crashes, not taking into account the developments in safety after those accidents. However, a flight data recorder is usually mounted in the aircraft's empennage (tail section) where it is more likely to survive a severe crash.

Between 1983 and 2000, the survival rate for people in U.S. plane crashes was greater than 95 percent.

=== Global Aeronautical Distress and Safety System ===
In an effort to prevent incidents such as the disappearance of Malaysia Airlines Flight MH370, a new standard has been issued requiring all commercial aircraft to report their position every 15 minutes to air traffic controllers regardless of the country of origin. Introduced in 2016 by the ICAO, the regulation has no initial requirement for any new aircraft equipment to be fitted. The standard is part of a long-term plan, called the Global Aeronautical Distress and Safety System (GADSS), which will require new aircraft to be equipped with data broadcast systems that are in constant contact with air traffic controllers. The GADSS is similar to the Global Maritime Distress and Safety System (GMDSS) used for maritime safety.

=== Aviation Safety Reporting System ===
The Aviation Safety Reporting System (ASRS) collects voluntarily submitted aviation safety incident/situation reports from pilots, controllers and others. The ASRS uses reports to identify system deficiencies, issue alert messages, and produce two publications, CALLBACK, and ASRS Directline. The collected information is made available to the public, and is used by the FAA, NASA and other organizations working in research and flight safety.

== Statistics ==
=== Bureau of Aircraft Accidents Archives (B3A) ===
The Bureau of Aircraft Accidents Archives (B3A), formerly known as the Aircraft Crashes Record Office (ACRO), a non-government organization based in Geneva, Switzerland, compiles statistics on aviation accidents of aircraft capable of carrying more than six passengers, excluding helicopters, balloons, and combat aircraft. ACRO only considers crashes in which the aircraft has suffered such damage that it is removed from service, which will further reduce the statistics for incidents and fatalities compared to some other data. The total fatalities due to aviation accidents since 1970 are 83,772. The total number of incidents is 11,164.

According to ACRO, recent years have been considerably safer for aviation, with fewer than 170 incidents every year between 2009 and 2017, compared to as many as 226 as recently as 1998.

The annual fatalities figure is less than 1,000 for ten of the fourteen years between 2007 and 2020, the year 2023 experiencing the lowest number of fatalities, at 246, since the end of World War II.

2014 included the disappearance of flight MH370 over the Indian Ocean and the shootdown of flight MH17 as part of the war in Donbas. The total number of fatalities in 2014 was 869 more than in 2013.

Deaths and incidents in the world per year according to ACRO and Bureau of Aircraft Accident Archives data, as of November 9, 2026:

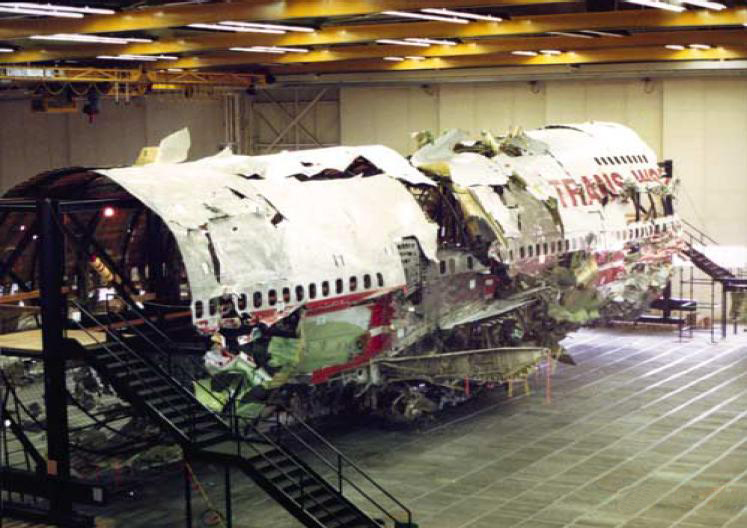
The reconstructed wreckage of TWA Flight 800 inside a hangar at Calverton Executive Airpark, New York state

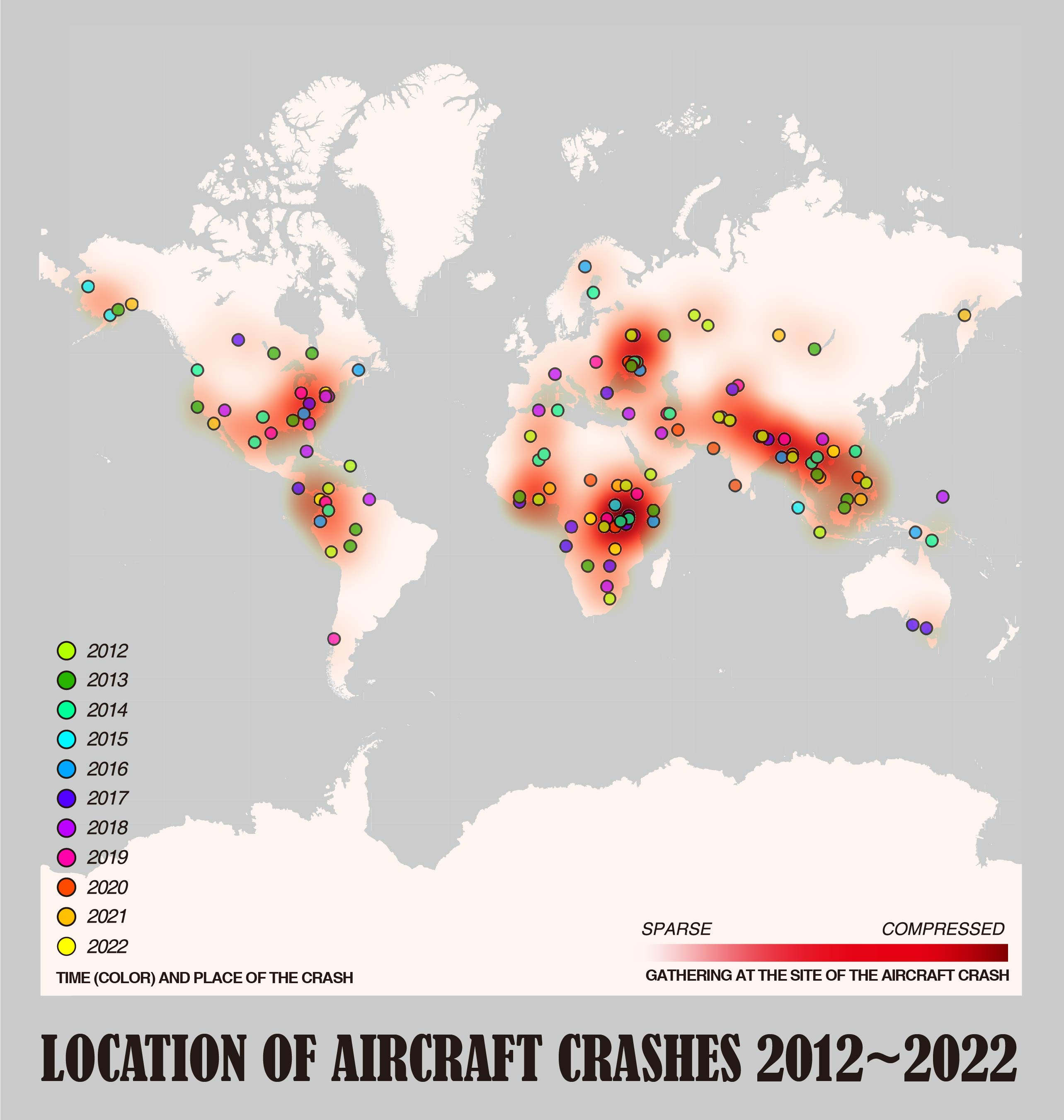
Location of aircraft crashes from 2012 to 2022

Year	Deaths	Number of incidents
1970	2,219	331
1971	2,278	312
1972	3,355	376
1973	2,950	372
1974	2,782	317
1975	1,930	332
1976	2,416	307
1977	2,556	372
1978	2,220	408
1979	2,593	382
1980	2,343	379
1981	1,585	320
1982	2,066	309
1983	2,047	289
1984	1,329	284
1985	3,023	296
1986	1,781	276
1987	2,157	341
1988	2,392	306
1989	2,603	337
1990	1,417	282
1991	2,023	269
1992	2,325	289
1993	1,782	299
1994	1,998	249
1995	1,848	295
1996	2,856	273
1997	1,797	252
1998	1,761	250
1999	1,178	233
2000	1,634	232
2001	1,545 (Note: Does not include victims of the September 11 attacks outside the planes. There were 2740 fatalities outside the planes, which would bring the total to 4279 if counted.)	230
2002	1,388	230
2003	1,260	225
2004	795	195
2005	1,478	212
2006	1,322	212
2007	1,008	195
2008	916	212
2009	1,120	182
2010	1,153	188
2011	850	181
2012	807	178
2013	465	173
2014	1,352	167
2015	938	175
2016	647	152
2017	404	129
2018	1,038	133
2019	586	148
2020	483	115
2021	411	115
2022	366	101
2023	246	109
2024	622	118
2025	810	110
2026 year-to-date as of Nov 9	393	80

(Data have significantly changed since November 2015 after a major upgrade to the death rate and crash rate web pages. This may reflect a change between a static and dynamic web page, where data were made to be automatically updated based on the incidents in their archives.)

Air accident fatalities recorded by ACRO 1918–2018

Air accident incidents recorded by ACRO 1918–2019

=== Annual Aviation Safety Review (EASA) ===
The European Aviation Safety Agency (EASA) is tasked by Article 15(4) of Regulation (EC) No 216/2008 of the European Parliament and of the Council of February 20, 2008, to provide an annual review of aviation safety.

The Annual Safety Review presents statistics on European and worldwide civil aviation safety. Statistics are grouped according to type of operation, for instance, commercial air transport, and aircraft category, such as aeroplanes, helicopters, gliders, etc. The Agency has access to accident and statistical information collected by the International Civil Aviation Organization (ICAO). States are required, according to ICAO Annex 13, on Aircraft Accident and Incident Investigation, to report to ICAO information, on accidents and serious incidents to aircraft with a maximum certificated take-off mass (MTOM) over 2250 kg. Therefore, most statistics in this review concern aircraft above this mass. In addition to the ICAO data, a request was made to the EASA Member States to obtain light aircraft accident data. Furthermore, data on the operation of aircraft for commercial air transport were obtained from both ICAO and the NLR Air Transport Safety Institute.

=== Other crashes with death tolls of 200 or more ===
Number of deaths	Date	Flight name	Aircraft type	Accident details
349	November 12, 1996	Saudia Flight 763 / Kazakhstan Airlines Flight 1907	Boeing 747 / Ilyushin Il-76	Saudia Flight 763 and Kazakhstan Airlines Flight 1907 collided mid-air over the town of Charkhi Dadri, near Delhi, India. The collision was mainly the result of the Kazakh pilot flying lower than the assigned clearance altitude. All 349 occupants on board the two aircraft died. It remains the world's deadliest mid-air collision without survivors. The Ramesh Chandra Lahoti Commission, empowered to study the causes, recommended the creation of the "semi-circular rule", to prevent aircraft from flying in opposite directions at the same altitude. The Civil Aviation Authorities in India made it mandatory for all aircraft flying in and out of India to be equipped with a Traffic Collision Avoidance System (TCAS), setting a worldwide precedent for mandatory use of TCAS.
346	March 3, 1974	Turkish Airlines Flight 981	McDonnell Douglas DC-10	Turkish Airlines Flight 981 crashed in a forest northeast of Paris, France. The London-bound aircraft crashed shortly after taking off from Orly airport; all 346 people aboard died. It was later determined that the cargo door detached, which caused an explosive decompression; this caused the floor just above to collapse. The collapsed floor severed the control cables, which left the pilots without control of the elevators, the rudder and No. 2 engine. The aircraft entered a steep dive and crashed. It was the deadliest plane crash of all time until the Tenerife disaster in 1977. It remains the deadliest single-aircraft crash with no survivors. This accident was also the deadliest single-aircraft crash that did not involve a Boeing 747.
329	June 23, 1985	Air India Flight 182	Boeing 747-237	Air India Flight 182 en route from Toronto and Montreal to London and Delhi, crashed off the southwest coast of Ireland when a bomb exploded in the cargo hold. All 307 passengers and 22 crew members died. One passenger had checked in as "M. Singh". Singh did not board the flight but his suitcase, containing the bomb, was loaded onto the aircraft. "M. Singh" was never identified or captured. It was later determined Sikh extremists were behind the bombing as a retaliation for the Indian government's attack on the Golden Temple in the city of Amritsar, spiritually the most significant shrine in Sikhism. This was, at the time, the deadliest terrorist attack involving an airplane.
301	August 19, 1980	Saudia Flight 163	Lockheed L-1011	Saudia Flight 163 became the world's deadliest aviation accident that did not involve a crash. The crew performed an emergency landing at Riyadh after a fire broke out in an aft baggage compartment. The fire burned through the ceiling of the compartment and into the passenger cabin. The crew landed the aircraft safely, but the captain did not stop immediately and order an evacuation. He taxied off the runway instead, by which time everyone in the cabin had become unconscious due to fumes and were unable to open any doors or evacuate. All 301 passengers and crew aboard died of suffocation before rescue ground crews could open any door, after which the aircraft burst into flames and was consumed by fire.
298	July 17, 2014	Malaysia Airlines Flight 17	Boeing 777-200ER	Malaysia Airlines Flight 17 flying from Amsterdam to Kuala Lumpur, was shot down in an area of Eastern Ukraine near the Ukraine/Russian border during the war in Donbas. There were 298 people on board: 283 passengers and 15 crew members, all of whom died. The crew were all Malaysians, while the passengers were of various nationalities, most from the Netherlands. Several Ukrainian Air Force (UAF) aircraft had been shot down over the rebel-controlled territory before the MH17 incident. Immediately after the crash, a post appeared on the VKontakte social media profile attributed to Igor Girkin, leader of the Donbas separatist militia, claiming responsibility for shooting down a Ukrainian An-26 military transport near Torez. The post was removed later the same day, and the separatists then denied shooting down any aircraft.
290	July 3, 1988	Iran Air Flight 655	Airbus A300-200	Iran Air Flight 655, an Iranian civilian airliner, was shot down by two surface-to-air missiles from the U.S. Navy guided missile cruiser USS Vincennes over the Strait of Hormuz. All 290 passengers and crew aboard the aircraft died. The downing was caused by a series of mistakes that led the USS Vincennes crew to believe that the airliner was an Iranian Air Force F-14.
275	February 19, 2003	Iranian military aircraft	Ilyushin Il-76	An Iranian military Ilyushin Il-76 crashed in mountainous terrain near Kerman in Iran. The official report says bad weather brought the aircraft down; high winds and fog were present at the time of the crash.
273	May 25, 1979	American Airlines Flight 191	McDonnell Douglas DC-10-10	American Airlines Flight 191 crashed shortly after lifting off the runway at Chicago O'Hare Airport after the number one (left) engine and pylon separated from the wing. This broke hydraulic lines, causing leading edge lift devices to retract on that side of the aircraft and resulted in asymmetrical lift and loss of control. The accident was attributed to improper maintenance procedures. The crash resulted in the deaths of all 271 passengers and crew on board, as well as two people on the ground. It remains the deadliest commercial aircraft accident in United States history, and was also the country's deadliest aviation disaster until the September 11 attacks in 2001.
270	December 21, 1988	Pan Am Flight 103	Boeing 747-121	Pan Am Flight 103 bound for New York–JFK from London–Heathrow with continued service to Detroit, was destroyed by a terrorist bomb over the town of Lockerbie, Scotland. All 259 occupants and 11 people on the ground (all residents of Sherwood Crescent, Lockerbie), died, making it the worst terrorist attack involving an aircraft in the UK and the deadliest terrorist attack on British soil. Following the crash, the Federal Aviation Administration imposed new security measures on American airlines flying out of 103 airports in Western Europe and the Middle East.
269	September 1, 1983	Korean Air Lines Flight 007	Boeing 747-230	A Soviet interceptor Sukhoi Su-15 shot down Korean Air Lines Flight 007 bound for Gimpo International Airport in Seoul, South Korea, after it unintentionally flew into Soviet airspace; all 269 occupants on board died.
265	November 12, 2001	American Airlines Flight 587	Airbus A300	American Airlines Flight 587 crashed in the Belle Harbor neighborhood of Queens, New York, just after departing John F. Kennedy International Airport bound for Las Américas International Airport, Santo Domingo. The first officer's overuse of the rudder in response to wake turbulence from a Japan Airlines 747 was cited as cause. All 260 people on board, as well as five people on the ground, died from the crash. It is the second-deadliest aviation accident on U.S. soil, after American Airlines Flight 191.
264	April 26, 1994	China Airlines Flight 140	Airbus A300B4-622R	China Airlines Flight 140 was completing a routine flight and approach at Nagoya Airport, Japan, when the Airbus A300B4-622R's First Officer inadvertently pressed the takeoff/go-around button, which raises the throttle position to the same as that for take offs and go-arounds. The action and the two pilots' reaction resulted in a crash that killed 264 (15 crew and 249 passengers) of the 271 people aboard.
261	July 11, 1991	Nigeria Airways Flight 2120	Douglas DC-8-61	Nigeria Airways Flight 2120 operated by Nationair Canada, crashed in Jeddah, Saudi Arabia, after two tires ignited upon takeoff, leading to an in-flight fire. All 261 occupants were killed. It is the deadliest aviation accident involving a DC-8, the largest aviation disaster involving a Canadian-registered aircraft and the second-worst accident in Saudi Arabia (after Saudi Arabian Airlines Flight 163 – see above).
260	June 12, 2025	Air India Flight 171	Boeing 787-8 Dreamliner	Air India Flight 171 flying from Ahmedabad, India, to London, United Kingdom, crashed shortly after takeoff into the Meghaninagar neighbourhood, killing all but one of the 242 people on board and also 19 people on the ground. According to a preliminary report by India's Aircraft Accident Investigation Bureau, the crash was caused by both engines losing thrust after the fuel control switches moved from the RUN to CUTOFF position. The cause of the switch movement remains under investigation.
257	April 11, 2018	Algerian Air Force transport aircraft	Ilyushin Il-76	Algerian Air Force transport aircraft crashed shortly after take-off from Boufarik Airport, killing all 257 occupants on board the Ilyushin Il-76.
257	November 28, 1979	Air New Zealand Flight 901	McDonnell Douglas DC-10-30	Air New Zealand Flight 901, an Antarctic sightseeing flight, collided with Mount Erebus on Ross Island, Antarctica, killing all 257 occupants on board. The flight crew had not been informed that the computer coordinates for the flight path of the McDonnell Douglas DC-10-30 had been changed the night before, directing the flight towards Mount Erebus rather than the usual path down McMurdo Sound.
256	December 12, 1985	Arrow Air Flight 1285R	Douglas DC-8-63CF	Arrow Air Flight 1285R carrying American military personnel on a charter flight home for Christmas, crashed in Newfoundland; all 256 occupants on board died. The Canadian Aviation Safety Board investigating the cause of the crash issued two different reports: the majority report cited ice on the wings as cause of the crash; the minority report suggests an explosion was the likely cause. This was the deadliest aviation incident in Canadian history.
239	March 8, 2014	Malaysia Airlines Flight 370	Boeing 777-200ER	Malaysia Airlines Flight 370 flying from Kuala Lumpur, Malaysia, to Beijing, China, lost contact with air traffic controllers over the South China Sea, deviated from its planned route, and was presumed lost in the southern Indian Ocean. It carried 12 Malaysian crew members and 227 passengers from 15 nations, who are all presumed dead. A multinational search effort, the most extensive and expensive in aviation history, has thus far failed to locate the aircraft, though debris from the aircraft has been recovered from beaches around the Indian Ocean. Numerous theories have been offered to explain the disappearance of the flight, with pilot suicide considered most likely, but none have been confirmed.
234	September 26, 1997	Garuda Indonesia Flight 152	Airbus A300B4-220	Garuda Indonesia Flight 152 which departed from Jakarta, Indonesia, and was preparing to land at Medan, North Sumatra, crashed into mountainous terrain, killing all 234 occupants on board. The causes included turning left instead of right as instructed by ATC and descending below the assigned altitude of 2,000 feet due to pilot error. It is the deadliest aviation disaster in Indonesia's history.
230	July 17, 1996	TWA Flight 800	Boeing 747-131	TWA Flight 800 carrying 230 occupants, exploded and crashed into the Atlantic Ocean near East Moriches, New York, shortly after departing from John F. Kennedy International Airport on a flight to Paris and Rome. A lengthy investigation concluded that the probable cause of the accident was a short circuit in a fuel tank that contained an explosive mixture of fuel vapor and air. As a result, new requirements were developed to prevent future fuel tank explosions in aircraft.
229	September 2, 1998	Swissair Flight 111	McDonnell Douglas MD-11	Swissair Flight 111 carrying 215 passengers and 14 crew from New York City to Geneva, Switzerland, crashed into the Atlantic Ocean near Halifax, Nova Scotia, Canada, killing all 229 people aboard. After a lengthy investigation, an official report stated that flammable material used in the aircraft's structure, specifically the Personal TV Systems recently installed in the Business Class Cabin, allowed a fire to spread, resulting in a loss of control.
228	June 1, 2009	Air France Flight 447	Airbus A330-203	Air France Flight 447 carrying 228 occupants, was en route from Rio de Janeiro, Brazil to Paris, France, when it crashed into the Atlantic Ocean. The aircraft's flight recorders were not recovered from the ocean floor until May 2011, and the final investigative report was released in July 2012. It determined that the disaster was likely due to the aircraft's pitot tubes being obstructed by ice crystals, causing the autopilot to disconnect. The crew reacted incorrectly, leading to an aerodynamic stall from which the jet did not recover.
228	August 6, 1997	Korean Air Flight 801	Boeing 747-3B5	Korean Air Flight 801 crashed on approach to the international airport in the United States territory of Guam, killing 228 of the 254 people aboard. Contributing factors in the crash were fatigue and errors by the flight crew, inadequate flight crew training, and a modification of the airport's altitude warning system that prevented it from detecting aircraft below a minimum safe altitude.
227	January 8, 1996	1996 Air Africa Antonov An-32 crash	Antonov An-32B	An Antonov An-32B aircraft with six crew members on board overshot the runway at N'Dolo Airport, Kinshasa, Democratic Republic of Congo, and crashed into a market place. Four on board survived but 225 people on the ground were killed and an estimated 500 were injured (estimated 253 seriously injured). It is the crash with the most non-passenger ground fatalities (not including 9/11). It is usually known as the 1996 Air Africa crash.
225	May 25, 2002	China Airlines Flight 611	Boeing 747-209B	China Airlines Flight 611 bound for Hong Kong International Airport in Hong Kong, disintegrated in mid-air and crashed into the Taiwan Strait 20 minutes after takeoff from Chiang Kai-shek International Airport (now Taiwan Taoyuan International Airport) in Taiwan. It was determined that the crash, which killed all 206 passengers and 19 crew members aboard the plane, was caused by improper repairs to the aircraft 22 years earlier when the aircraft encountered a tailstrike.
224	October 31, 2015	Metrojet Flight 9268	Airbus A321-231	Metrojet Flight 9268 crashed in the Sinai Peninsula after departing Sharm el-Sheikh International Airport, Egypt, en route to Pulkovo Airport, Saint Petersburg, Russia. All 224 occupants on board were killed. A branch of the Islamic State of Iraq and the Levant claimed responsibility for bringing down the jet, and a Russian investigation concluded that a bomb was detonated inside the plane at a high altitude.
223	May 26, 1991	Lauda Air Flight 004	Boeing 767-3Z9ER	Lauda Air Flight 004 broke up in midair over a remote area of Thailand due to an uncommanded deployment of a thrust reverser on one of the plane's engines, killing all 223 occupants aboard. The flight, which originated at Kai Tak Airport, Hong Kong, and made a stopover at Don Mueang International Airport in Bangkok, Thailand, was en route to Vienna International Airport, Vienna, Austria, when the accident occurred.
217	October 31, 1999	EgyptAir Flight 990	Boeing 767-366ER	EgyptAir Flight 990 flying from Los Angeles International Airport, United States, to Cairo International Airport, Egypt, with a stop at John F. Kennedy International Airport, New York City, crashed into the Atlantic Ocean south of Nantucket Island, Massachusetts, killing all 217 occupants on board. The National Transportation Safety Board determined that the probable cause of the crash was deliberate action by the relief first officer in response to his removal from international service within Egyptair, a finding disputed by Egyptian authorities who maintain another cause of the accident.
213	January 1, 1978	Air India Flight 855	Boeing 747-237B	Air India Flight 855 crashed into the Arabian Sea just off the coast of Bombay, India, killing all 213 occupants on board. An investigation concluded that the captain became disoriented after the failure of one of the flight instruments in the cockpit, leading to "irrational control inputs" that caused the plane to crash.
202	February 16, 1998	China Airlines Flight 676	Airbus A300B4-622R	China Airlines Flight 676 en route from Ngurah Rai Airport in Bali, Indonesia, to Chiang Kai-shek International Airport (now Taoyuan International Airport), Taiwan, crashed into a road and residential neighborhood in Taoyuan, Taiwan, killing 182 passengers, 14 crew, and six people on the ground. An investigation determined that when the control tower ordered the pilot to abort his landing and "go around" for a second attempt, the pilot, who had unintentionally released the plane's autopilot, did nothing to take control of the plane for 11 seconds as he apparently thought the autopilot would initiate the go around. As the aircraft approached the airport, the pilot executed a sudden steep ascent that produced a stall and crash. China Airlines was also criticized for "insufficient training".
200	July 10, 1985	Aeroflot Flight 5143	Tupolev Tu-154B-2	Aeroflot Flight 5143 on a domestic Karshi–Ufa–Leningrad route, crashed near Uchkuduk, Uzbek SSR, Soviet Union, on the first leg of its route. All 200 occupants on board were killed. An investigation concluded that the plane went down due to pilot error. The air crew used an inappropriately low airspeed, causing vibrations that they incorrectly interpreted as engine surges. As a result, they further reduced engine power, causing the aircraft to stall and crash.

== Investigation ==
Annex 13 of the Chicago Convention provides the international Standards And Recommended Practices that form the basis for air accident and incident investigations by signatory countries, as well as reporting and preventive measures. The International Civil Aviation Organization (ICAO) is specifically focused on preventing accidents, rather than determining liability.

=== Australia ===
In Australia, the Australian Transport Safety Bureau is the federal government body responsible for investigating transport-related accidents and incidents, covering air, sea, and rail travel. Formerly an agency of the Department of Infrastructure, Transport, Regional Development and Local Government, in 2010, in the interests of keeping its independence it became a stand-alone agency.

=== Brazil ===
In Brazil, the Aeronautical Accidents Investigation and Prevention Center (CENIPA) was established under the auspices of the Aeronautical Accident Investigation and Prevention Center, a Military Organization of the Brazilian Air Force (FAB). The organization is responsible for the activities of aircraft accident prevention, and investigation of civil and military aviation occurrences. Formed in 1971, and in accordance with international standards, CENIPA represented a new philosophy: investigations are conducted with the sole purpose of promoting the "prevention of aeronautical accidents".

=== Canada ===
In Canada, the Transportation Safety Board of Canada (TSB), is an independent agency responsible for the advancement of transportation safety through the investigation and reporting of accident and incident occurrences in all prevalent Canadian modes of transportation – marine, air, rail and pipeline.

=== China ===
In China, the Civil Aviation Administration of China (CAAC) is solely responsible for all air investigations and safety inside the country after the split from the formal CAAC Airlines.

=== Ethiopia ===
In Ethiopia, the Civil Aviation Accident Prevention and Investigation Bureau of the Ethiopian Civil Aviation Authority (ECAA), which is an agency of the Ministry of Transport and Communications, conducts aircraft accident investigations in Ethiopia or involving Ethiopian aircraft.

=== France ===
In France, the agency responsible for investigation of civilian air crashes is the Bureau d'Enquêtes et d'Analyses pour la Sécurité de l'Aviation Civile (BEA). Its purpose is to establish the circumstances and causes of the accident and to make recommendations for their future avoidance.

=== Germany ===
In Germany, the agency for investigating air crashes is the Federal Bureau of Aircraft Accidents Investigation (BFU). It is an agency of the Federal Ministry of Transport and Digital Infrastructure. The focus of the BFU is to improve safety by determining the causes of accidents and serious incidents and making safety recommendations to prevent recurrence.

=== Hong Kong ===
The Air Accident Investigation Authority (AAIA) is responsible for investigating civil aviation accidents in Hong Kong, as well as those in other territories involving a Hong Kong-registered aircraft. It is led by Darren Straker, Chief Inspector of Accidents, and headquartered at Hong Kong International Airport. AAIA was established in 2018 in response to an ICAO directive instructing that member states maintain air accident investigation authorities that are independent of civil aviation authorities and related entities. Prior to 2018, accident investigation duties were held by the Civil Aviation Department's Flight Standards & Airworthiness Division and Accident Investigation Division.

=== India ===
Until May 30, 2012, the Directorate General of Civil Aviation investigated incidents involving aircraft. Since then, the Aircraft Accident Investigation Bureau has taken over investigation responsibilities.

=== Indonesia ===
In Indonesia, the National Transportation Safety Committee (NTSC; Indonesian: Komite Nasional Keselamatan Transportasi, KNKT) is responsible for the investigation of incidents and accidents, including air accidents. Its aim is the improvement of transportation safety, not just aviation, in Indonesia.

=== Italy ===
Created in 1999 in Italy, the Agenzia Nazionale per la Sicurezza del Volo (ANSV), has two main tasks: conducting technical investigations for civil aviation aircraft accidents and incidents, while issuing safety recommendations as appropriate; and conducting studies and surveys aimed at increasing flight safety. The organization is also responsible for establishing and maintaining the "voluntary reporting system". Although not under the supervision of the Ministry of Infrastructure and Transport, the ANSV is a public authority under the oversight of the Presidency of the Council of Ministers of Italy.

=== Japan ===
The Japan Transport Safety Board investigates aviation accidents and incidents. The Aircraft Accident Investigation Commission investigated aviation accidents and incidents in Japan until October 1, 2001, when the Aircraft and Railway Accidents Investigation Commission (ARAIC) replaced it, and the ARAIC did this function until October 1, 2008, when it merged into the JTSB.

=== Malaysia ===
Established in 2016, the Air Accident Investigation Bureau (AAIB) Malaysia is the main investigation body for aircraft accident/incident. Separate from Civil Aviation Authority of Malaysia (CAAM) and Malaysian Aviation Commission (MAVCOM) that is the national aviation authority and commission that oversee aviation economy respectively. The AAIB operates from the ministry of transport headquarters in Putrajaya, and its black box laboratory situated in STRIDE, the ministry of defenses research institute. AAIB Malaysia is teamed by civilians and seconded Royal Malaysian Airforce senior officer and a group of pool investigators from Malaysia Institute of Aviation Technology

=== Mexico ===
In Mexico, the Directorate General of Civil Aviation (DGAC) investigates aviation accidents.

=== Netherlands ===
In the Netherlands, the Dutch Safety Board (Onderzoeksraad voor Veiligheid) is responsible for the investigation of incidents and accidents, including air accidents. Its aim is the improvement of safety in the Netherlands. Its main focus is on those situations in which civilians are dependent on the government, companies or organizations for their safety. The Board solely investigates when incidents or accidents occur and aims to draw lessons from the results of these investigations. The Safety Board is objective, impartial and independent in its judgment. The Board will always be critical towards all parties concerned.

=== New Zealand ===
In New Zealand, the Transport Accident Investigation Commission (TAIC) is responsible for the investigation of air accidents. "The Commission's purpose, as set out in its Act, is to determine the circumstances and causes of aviation, rail and maritime accidents, and incidents, with a view to avoiding similar occurrences in the future, rather than to ascribe blame to any person." The TAIC investigates with accordance with annex 13 of the ICAO and specific New Zealand legislation.

=== Poland ===
In Poland, State Commission on Aircraft Accidents Investigation (Polish: Państwowa Komisja Badania Wypadków Lotniczych, PKBWL) is responsible for investigating all civil aviation accidents and incidents occurring in the country. Headquartered in Warsaw, the commission is a division of the Ministry of Infrastructure. As of November 2022, the head of the PKBWL is Bogusław Trela.

=== Russia ===
In Russia, the Interstate Aviation Committee (IAC, MAK according to the original Russian name) is an executive body overseeing the use and management of civil aviation in the Commonwealth of Independent States. This organization investigates air accidents in the former USSR area under the umbrella of the Air Accident Investigation Commission of the Interstate Aviation Committee. There are active discussion to dismantling the committee, and in 2020, Armenia and Russia has signed on a joint agreement establishing the International Bureau for investigating aviation accidents and serious incidents (In Russian: Международное бюро по расследованию авиационных происшествий и серьезных инцидентов), designed to replace the committee and to act as upper body for investigation of aviation incidents and, subordinate to the Eurasian Union. The new body has been assigned duties to investigate serious accidents and incidents in accordance with the requirements of ICAO documents, ensuring independent investigation of accidents, cooperation and interaction between the parties in relation to investigating aircraft accidents, development and use of common rules and procedures for investigating aircraft accidents.

=== Taiwan ===
In Taiwan, the Taiwan Transportation Safety Board (TTSB) is the independent government agency that is responsible for major transportation accident investigations. TTSB's predecessor was ASC, which was established in 1998. TTSB is under the administration of the Executive Yuan and independent from Civil Aviation Administration. The TTSB consisted of five to seven board members, including a chairman and a vice chairman, appointed by the Premier. The managing director of TTSB manages the day-to-day function of the organization, including accident investigations.

=== United Kingdom ===
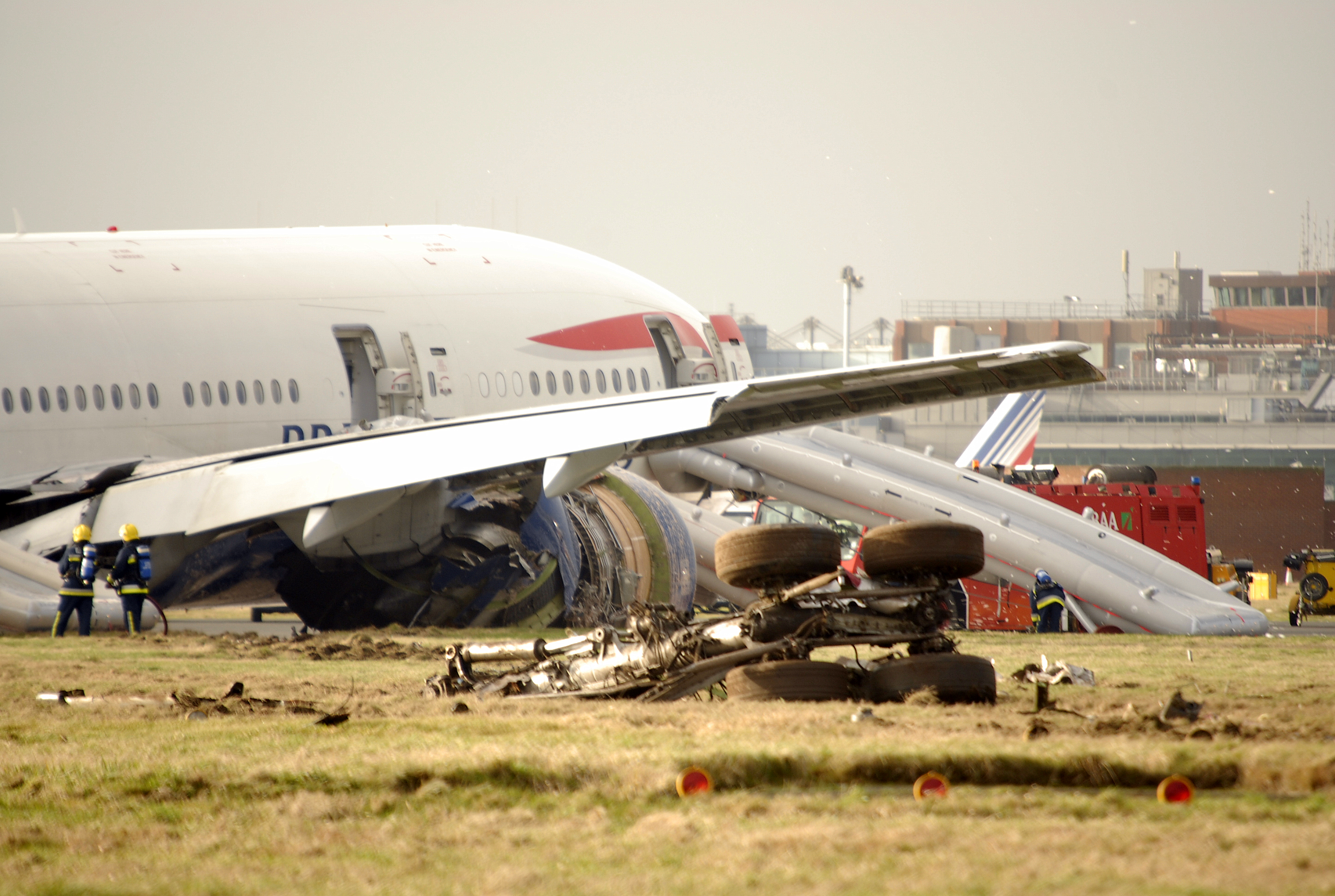
The wreckage of British Airways Flight 38, a Boeing 777 that crashed at London Heathrow Airport

In the United Kingdom, the agency responsible for investigation of civilian air crashes is the Air Accidents Investigation Branch (AAIB) of the Department for Transport. Its purpose is to establish the circumstances and causes of the accident and to make recommendations for their future avoidance.

=== United States ===
United States civil aviation incidents are investigated by the National Transportation Safety Board (NTSB). NTSB officials piece together evidence from the crash site to determine likely cause, or causes. The NTSB also investigates overseas incidents involving US-registered aircraft, in collaboration with local investigative authorities, especially when significant loss of American lives occurs, or when the involved aircraft is American-built.

=== Venezuela ===
In Venezuela, the organization tasked with investigating aviation accidents is the Ministry of Aquatic and Air Transport, more specifically the Directorate General for the Prevention and Investigation of Aeronautical Accidents.

== Retirement of flight numbers ==
Out of respect for the deceased and injured, airlines commonly retire the flight number associated with a fatal or major crash. Examples in which airlines retired a flight number after a crash include Malaysia Airlines Flight 370, Malaysia Airlines Flight 17, Korean Air Lines Flight 007, Air India Flight 171, and all four flights involved in the September 11 attacks. However, that is not always the case; for example, Delta Air Lines still used flight numbers 723 and 1288 as of 2013.

== See also ==
- Category:19th-century aviation accidents and incidents
- Category:20th-century aviation accidents and incidents
- Category:21st-century aviation accidents and incidents

By person(s) killed

- List of fatalities from aviation accidents
- List of heads of government and state who died in aviation accidents and incidents
- List of aviation accidents and incidents with a sole survivor

Lists of airliner accidents

- by year
- by airline
- by location
- by death toll
- in the United States
- in the UK

Types of accidents

- Category:Aviation accidents and incidents by aircraft
- Category:Aviation accidents and incidents by type
- Bird strike
- Controlled flight into terrain
- List of accidents and incidents involving commercial aircraft
- List of accidents and incidents involving general aviation (including chartered / non-scheduled passenger flights)
- List of aircraft structural failures
- List of airship accidents
- Mid-air collision
- Pilot error
- Runway incursion
- Shootdown
- Uncontrolled decompression

Lists of military aircraft accidents

- List of accidents and incidents involving the Lockheed C-130 Hercules
- List of aviation accidents and incidents in the war in Afghanistan
- List of aviation shootdowns and accidents during the Iraq War
- List of aviation shootdowns and accidents during the Syrian Civil War
- Lists of accidents and incidents involving military aircraft

Aviation safety

- Aviation archaeology
- Aviation safety

Aviation authorities

- Agência Nacional de Aviação Civil (ANAC, Brazil)
- Civil Aviation Administration of China (CAAC, China)
- Civil Aviation Authority of New Zealand (CAA, NZ)
- Civil Aviation Authority (United Kingdom) (CAA, UK)
- Civil Aviation Safety Authority (CASA, Australia)
- Directorate General for Civil Aviation (France) (DGAC, France)
- Directorate General of Civil Aviation (DGCA, India)
- European Aviation Safety Agency (EASA)
- Federal Aviation Administration (FAA, United States)
- International Civil Aviation Organization (ICAO)
- Italian Civil Aviation Authority (ENAC, Italy)
- Luftfahrt-Bundesamt (LBA, Germany)
- Pakistan Civil Aviation Authority (CAA, Pakistan)
- Transport Canada (TC, Canada)

Other

- Accident analysis
- Aircraft hijacking
- Flight 191 (disambiguation)
- Flight 901 (disambiguation)
- List of air show accidents and incidents in the 20th century
- List of news aircraft accidents and incidents
- List of spaceflight-related accidents and incidents
- Civil aviation authority
- Skydiving regulation in the United States
- Talk-down aircraft landing

== Bibliography ==
- Oster, Clinton V.; Strong, John S.; Zorn, C. Kurt (1992). Why Airplanes Crash: Aviation Safety in a Changing World. New York: Oxford University Press. ISBN 0-19-507223-5.
- Savage, Ian (1999). "Aviation Deregulation and Safety in the United States: Evidence After Twenty Years". In Gaudry, Marc; Mayes, Robert (eds.). Taking Stock of Air Liberalization. Springer Science+Business Media. ISBN 978-1-4613-7309-4.
