= ATSI =

ATSI may refer to:

- Atsi, another name for the Zaiwa language of China and Burma
- Aboriginal and Torres Strait Islander people, the first peoples of Australia. The ATSI abbreviation is often considered disrespectful.
- Ahtna Technical Services Incorporated a subsidiary of Ahtna, Incorporated
- NLR Air Transport Safety Institute
- Anatomy Trains Structural Integration, a school related to Rolfing
