= AAIA =

AAIA may refer to:

- Aden-Abyan Islamic Army, Islamist group, Yemen
- Air Accident Investigation Authority, a Hong Kong government agency
- Area Analysis Intelligence Agency of the United States Army Foreign Science and Technology Center, a predecessor of the Pentagon's Defense Intelligence Agency
- Asia American International Academy, Linkou District, New Taipei City, Taipei, Taiwan
- Associate of the Association of International Accountants; see Association of International Accountants#Membership
- Association on American Indian Affairs
- Automotive Aftermarket Industry Association, former name of the Auto Care Association
- Australian Archaeological Institute at Athens, foreign archaeological institute in Greece
- Australian Adult Industry Awards Australian pornography award since 2001
