= Flight 901 =

Flight 901 may refer to several aviation incidents, listed chronologically:

- Austrian Airlines Flight 901, a Vickers Viscount crash near Moscow Sheremetyevo Airport, on 26 September 1960; 31 killed
- Paradise Airlines Flight 901A, crashed on the city of Lake Tahoe, California, United States on 1 March 1964; all 85 occupants dead
- Sterling Airways Flight 901, a Sud-Aviation Caravelle which experienced a landing gear failure which subsequently ruptured the fuel tank on 15 March 1974; 15 people died
- Air New Zealand Flight 901, a McDonnell Douglas DC-10 which collided with Mount Erebus, Antarctica on 28 November 1979; 257 killed
- Austral Líneas Aéreas Flight 901, a BAC One-Eleven crash near Buenos Aires, on 7 May 1981; 31 killed
- Scandinavian Airlines System Flight 901, a McDonnell Douglas DC-10 runway excursion at John F. Kennedy Airport, on 28 February 1984; all 177 survived
- Vieques Air Link Flight 901A, crashed into the Atlantic Ocean off Vieques, Puerto Rico on 2 August 1984; all 9 occupants died
- Alas Chiricanas Flight 901, a Embraer EMB 110 Bandeirante bombing in Panama, on 19 July 1994; 21 dead
- Aviateca Flight 901, a Boeing 737-200 which collided with the San Vicente volcano in El Salvador on 9 August 1995; 65 killed
- Buddha Air Flight 901, a ATR-72 which overran the runway at Bhadrapur Airport on 2 January 2026; all 55 survived
