= Civil Aviation Department (Hong Kong) =

Hong Kong government department

- 民航處

Agency overview
- Formed: 1 May 1946; 80 years ago
- Headquarters: Civil Aviation Department Headquarters, 1 Tung Fai Road, Hong Kong International Airport, Lantau, Hong Kong
- Employees: 966 (March 2022)
- Annual budget: 1303m HKD (2022-23)
- Agency executive: Liu Chi-yung, Victor, JP, Director-General of Civil Aviation
- Parent agency: Transport and Logistics Bureau
- Website: www.cad.gov.hk

Civil Aviation Department
- Traditional Chinese: 民航處
- Simplified Chinese: 民航处
- Cantonese Yale: Màhn hòhng chyu
Transcriptions
Standard Mandarin
- Hanyu Pinyin: Mínháng Chù
Yue: Cantonese
- Yale Romanization: Màhn hòhng chyu
- Jyutping: Man4 hong4 cyu3

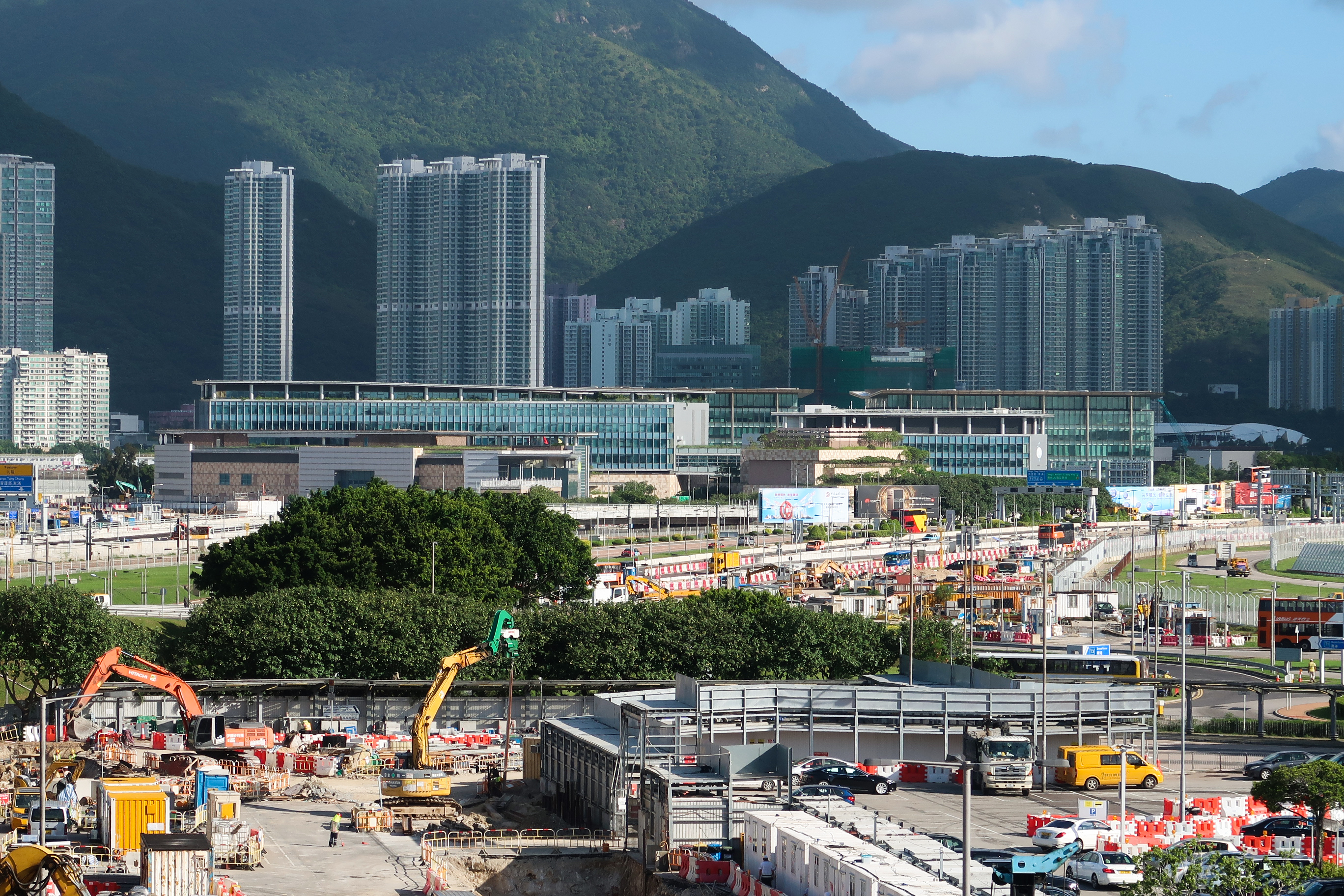
Head office

The Civil Aviation Department (CAD) is the civil aviation authority of Hong Kong, headquartered in the Civil Aviation Department Headquarters at Hong Kong International Airport. The department is responsible for providing air traffic control services to all aircraft operating within the Hong Kong Flight Information Region. It reports to the Transport and Logistics Bureau of the Hong Kong Government. The current Director-General of Civil Aviation is Victor Liu Chi-yung.

The CAD was also responsible for managing the former Hong Kong International Airport at Kai Tak, until it was retired and replaced by the new Hong Kong International Airport managed by the Airport Authority.

During British rule, CAD was not a sub-unit of the British Civil Aviation Authority. Since 1997, CAD maintains independence from the Civil Aviation Administration of China.

== History ==
The CAD was established on 1 May 1946.

In 2018, responsibility for investigation of aircraft accidents was transferred to the newly formed Air Accident Investigation Authority (AAIA).

== Structure ==
CAD includes the following divisions:

- Deputy Director-General of Civil Aviation (1)
  - Flight Standards and Airworthiness Division
  - Air Traffic Management Division
  - Air Traffic Engineering Services Division
  - Airport Standards Division
- Deputy Director-General of Civil Aviation (2)
  - Air Services and Safety Management Division
  - Administration Division
  - Finance Division

== Facilities ==
The agency is headquartered at Hong Kong International Airport on Chek Lap Kok. Previously it was on the 46th floor of the Queensway Government Offices.

== Safety concerns ==
In late 2016, CAD introduced a new air traffic system which attracted concerns over the increased risk of safety within Hong Kong airspace. On 8 February, a FactWire investigation showed that there were 6 cases of safety incidents involving "loss of separation" in January 2017 due to technical issues with CAD's new air traffic management system (ATMS). 5 of the cases occurred during peak-time Lunar New Year holidays, and were resolved internally. As a comparison, it was noted that only 10 incidents of "loss of separation" occurred per year under the previous system, with such cases being treated as very serious due to the risk of mid-air collision. After criticism of not having announced the 6 "LOS" incidents, CAD released a statement on their website to clarify that all incidents were classified as "minor" internally.

== See also ==
- Airport Authority Hong Kong
  - Hong Kong International Airport
- Civil Aviation Authority of Macau SAR
- CAAC Flight 301
- China Airlines Flight 642
