= Talk-down aircraft landing =

Unqualified passenger being talked through landing a plane

A talk-down aircraft landing is a type of aircraft landing that may be attempted in the event of the death or incapacitation of an aircraft pilot. It involves a passenger or flight attendant flying the aircraft to a landing with assistance from radioed instructions either from air traffic control or a nearby aircraft.

There is no record of a successful talk-down landing of a large commercial aircraft; several pilots have confirmed that such a task would be nearly impossible due to the complexity of a passenger plane's control system and the difficulty of navigation, as well as the landing itself, and that it is nearly impossible for both pilots to be unable to operate the plane. However, due to the fame of movies depicting the scenario, and the Dunning-Kruger effect, a YouGov poll reported that a third of Americans (excluding pilots) think they would be able to land a commercial plane in an emergency "as well as a pilot could". There have, however, been incidents where qualified pilots travelling as passengers or flight attendants on commercial flights have taken the co-pilot's seat to assist the pilot. The only recorded talk-down landings have been of simpler aircraft, such as Piper, Beechcraft, or Cessna planes.

== List of recorded talk-down landings ==
- In August 2000, the pilot of a single-engine Piper Cherokee Six collapsed over the controls. A passenger, Henry Anhalt, took over the controls of the plane and managed to land the airplane safely with radio talk-down assistance from an airborne flight instructor. He, his wife, and their three sons landed safely, although the aircraft was damaged on landing.
- In an incident in April 2009, a passenger took over control of a twin-engine turboprop Beechcraft King Air after the pilot died, and managed to land the plane safely. The passenger was a pilot but had never flown a Beechcraft King Air before.
- On 27 May 2011, a woman landed an airplane of unidentified type, on a flight between California and Colorado, with talk-down assistance from another airborne pilot, after her husband, the pilot, had breathing difficulties.
- In April 2012, the pilot of a twin-engine Cessna 414 aircraft lost consciousness while flying in Wisconsin. His 80-year-old wife Helen Collins, who had only piloted a single-engine aircraft many years earlier, was able to contact air traffic control. Air traffic controllers and the pilot of a shadow aircraft then provided instruction, and she was able to crash-land the plane without serious injury. Her husband did not survive his medical emergency.
- In October 2013, the pilot of a Cessna 172 aircraft became unwell whilst flying from Skegness, Lincolnshire, England. His 77-year-old passenger, John Wildey, who had served in the Royal Air Force but not as a pilot, controlled the plane for over an hour and landed it safely at Humberside Airport under instruction from air traffic controllers, two flying instructors, and the crew of a Westland Sea King helicopter. The pilot was taken to hospital, where he was pronounced dead. A TV documentary entitled Mayday: The Passenger Who Landed a Plane was made about the incident, including interview footage with Wildey himself.
- On 31 August 2019, the instructor of a two-seater Cessna 152 aircraft (registration VH-TFR) lost consciousness whilst on a flying lesson from Jandakot Airport, Perth, Western Australia. The 29-year-old student, Max Sylvester, on his first flying lesson in a Cessna 152, landed the aircraft undamaged at Jandakot following practice approaches, assisted by ATC and an instructor via radio. The pilot was taken to hospital and was in stable condition.
- On 10 May 2022, the passenger of a private Cessna Caravan (N333LD) with no prior flying experience landed the airplane with directions from an air traffic controller at Palm Beach International Airport in Florida.
