= NLR Air Transport Safety Institute =

Dutch research organization

- Type: Non-profit organisation
- Industry: Aviation safety
- Founded: 2007
- Headquarters: Amsterdam, Netherlands
- Key people: Michel Piers (Institute Director)
- Number of employees: 32
- Website: http://www.nlr-atsi.nl/

The NLR Air Transport Safety Institute (NLR-ATSI) is a research and consultancy organisation embedded in the National Aerospace Laboratory of the Netherlands (NLR). NLR-ATSI is one of the largest institutes of its kind in Europe. The institute was officially opened by Prof. Pieter van Vollenhoven on October 31, 2007. NLR-ATSI is a not-for-profit organisation with 32 employees. Around the world, NLR helps all air transportation stakeholders understand and address the complex safety challenges of new technologies and operations required for air transportation development. NLP's clients include air navigation service providers, aviation authorities, airports and airlines.

The institute advises government and industry in the Netherlands and abroad on air transport safety issues. The services provided by NLR-ATSI can be divided into the following expert areas:

- Safety Management
- Safety regulation
- Safety cases and safety assessments
- Operational and flight technical assessments
- Air safety data analysis
- Safety modelling for advanced operations
- Incident & Accident investigation
- Safety training
- Security

The European Aviation Safety Agency (EASA) uses data from NLR-ATSI on the operation of aircraft for commercial air transport for their annual safety review.
