= Air Accident Investigation Authority =

Hong Kong government agency

- 民航意外調查機構
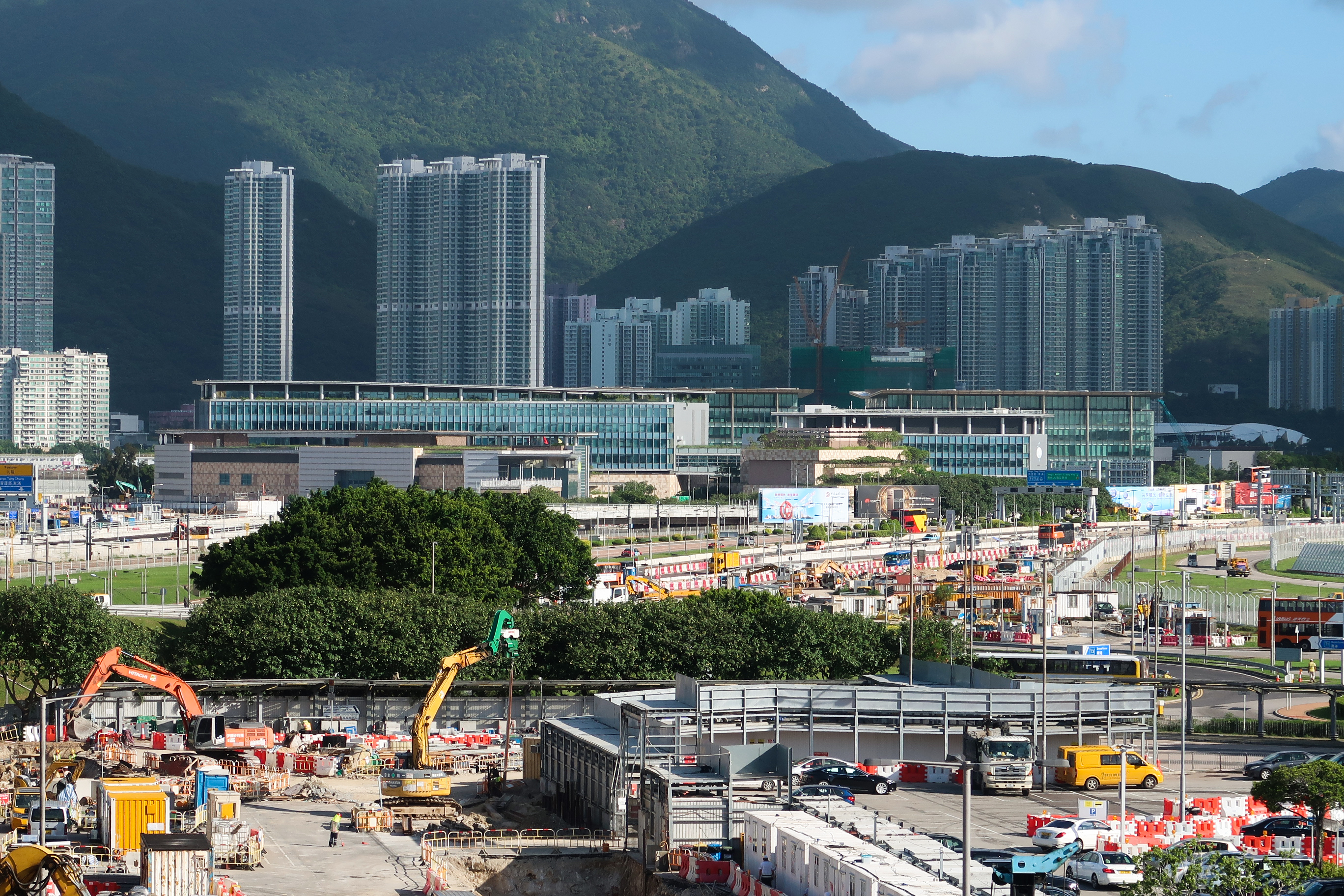
- Civil Aviation Department Headquarters, where AAIA is headquartered

Agency overview
- Formed: 10 September 2018; 8 years ago
- Jurisdiction: The Government of the Hong Kong Special Administrative Region
- Headquarters: 1 Tung Fai Road Lantau, New Territories
- Agency executives: Man Ka-chai, Chief Accident and Safety Investigator; SIU Kam-san, Andeon, Deputy Chief Accident and Safety Investigator
- Parent agency: Transport and Logistics Bureau
- Website: www.tlb.gov.hk/aaia/eng/index.html

Air Accident Investigation Authority
- Traditional Chinese: 民航意外調查機構
- Simplified Chinese: 民航意外调查机构
Transcriptions
Standard Mandarin
- Hanyu Pinyin: Mínháng Yìwài Diàochá Jīgòu
Yue: Cantonese
- Jyutping: man4 hong4 ji3 ngoi6 diu6 caa4 gei1 kau3

The Air Accident Investigation Authority (AAIA; traditional Chinese: 民航意外調查機構; simplified Chinese: 民航意外调查机构) is responsible for investigating civil aviation accidents in Hong Kong, as well as those in other territories involving a Hong Kong-registered aircraft. It was established in 2018 under the Transport and Housing Bureau, currently the Transport and Logistics Bureau of the Government of Hong Kong.

Its head office is on the property of Hong Kong International Airport.

== Background ==
Investigating aviation accidents was previously the responsibility of the Civil Aviation Department (CAD), Hong Kong's civil aviation authority. In 2016, the International Civil Aviation Organization (ICAO) implemented new standards requiring that member states maintain air accident investigation authorities that are independent of civil aviation authorities and related entities. This aims to ensure that accident investigations are conducted objectively, as the regulatory environment and air traffic control system may fall within the remit of an investigation.

The new ICAO standards took effect in November 2016, and were recommended for implementation within two years. To meet the new requirements, the Hong Kong Government set up the AAIA under the Transport and Housing Bureau. Its director, holding the title of chief inspector of accidents, took office on 10 September 2018, thereby marking the formal establishment of the AAIA. The legislative framework for the new agency came into effect on 3 December 2018, formally transferring relevant functions and powers of the director-general of civil aviation (the head of the CAD) to the chief inspector of accidents.

== Chief investigators ==
The AAIA is led by a Chief Accident and Safety Investigator (formerly Chief Inspector of Accidents):

#	Name	Tenure start	Tenure end	Tenure length
1	Darren Gregory Straker	10 September 2018	April 2020	
2	Man Ka-chai (文家齊)	April 2020	Incumbent	
