= Tonggui Township =

Tonggui Township 通贵乡
- Township
- Location in Ningxia
- Coordinates: 38°29′44″N 106°29′10″E
- Country: People's Republic of China
- Autonomous region: Ningxia
- Prefecture-level city: Yinchuan
- District: Xingqing District
- Time zone: UTC+8 (China Standard)

Tonggui Township (simplified Chinese: 通贵乡; traditional Chinese: 通貴鄉; pinyin: Tōngguì Xiāng) is a township under the administration of Xingqing District, Yinchuan, Ningxia, China. As of 2018, it has 6 villages under its administration.
