= Hedong Airport railway station =

Railway station in Yinchuan, Ningxia

Hedong Airport 河东机场

General information
- Location: Lingwu, Yinchuan, Ningxia; China
- Lines: Yinchuan–Lanzhou high-speed railway Yinchuan–Xi'an high-speed railway

History
- Opened: 29 December 2019
Location

Hedong Airport railway station (Chinese: 河东机场站) is a railway station in Lingwu, Yinchuan, Ningxia. It is an underground station which serves Yinchuan Hedong International Airport.

== History ==
The station was opened on 29 December 2019 with the first stage of the Yinchuan–Lanzhou high-speed railway.
