= China Northwest Airlines =

Airline of China (1989–2002)

China Northwest Airlines 中国西北航空公司

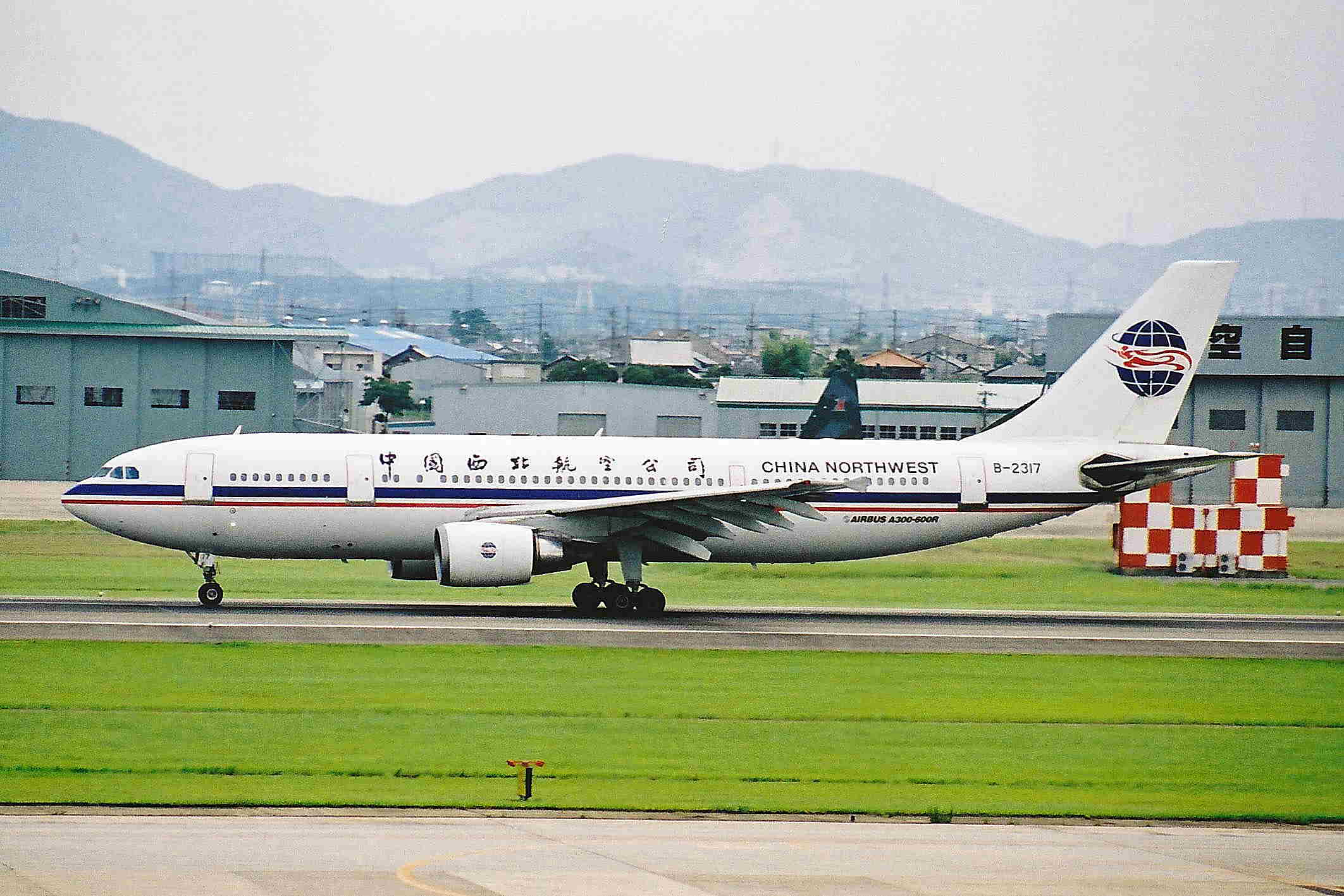
- China Northwest A300-600R in Chubu Centrair International Airport
IATA	ICAO	Call sign
WH	CNW	CHINA NORTHWEST
- Founded: 1 May 1988
- Ceased operations: 11 October 2002 (merged into China Eastern Airlines)
- Hubs: Lanzhou; Nanjing–Dajiaochang (1989–1997); Nanjing–Lukou (1997–2002); Xi'an–Xianyang (1991–2002); Xi'an–Xiguan (1989–1991); Zhuhai
- Subsidiaries: Nanjing Airlines (80%)
- Fleet size: 31
- Headquarters: Xi'an, Shaanxi, China
- Key people: Gao Junqui (president); Wang Tang (vice president); Wang Wancai (vice president)
- Employees: 4,906 (2000)

China Northwest Airlines Co., Ltd. (中国西北航空公司) was a Chinese airline headquartered in Xi'an, Shaanxi, People's Republic of China. It started operations in 1989. In 2002, the airline, along with China Yunnan Airlines, merged into China Eastern Airlines.

== History ==
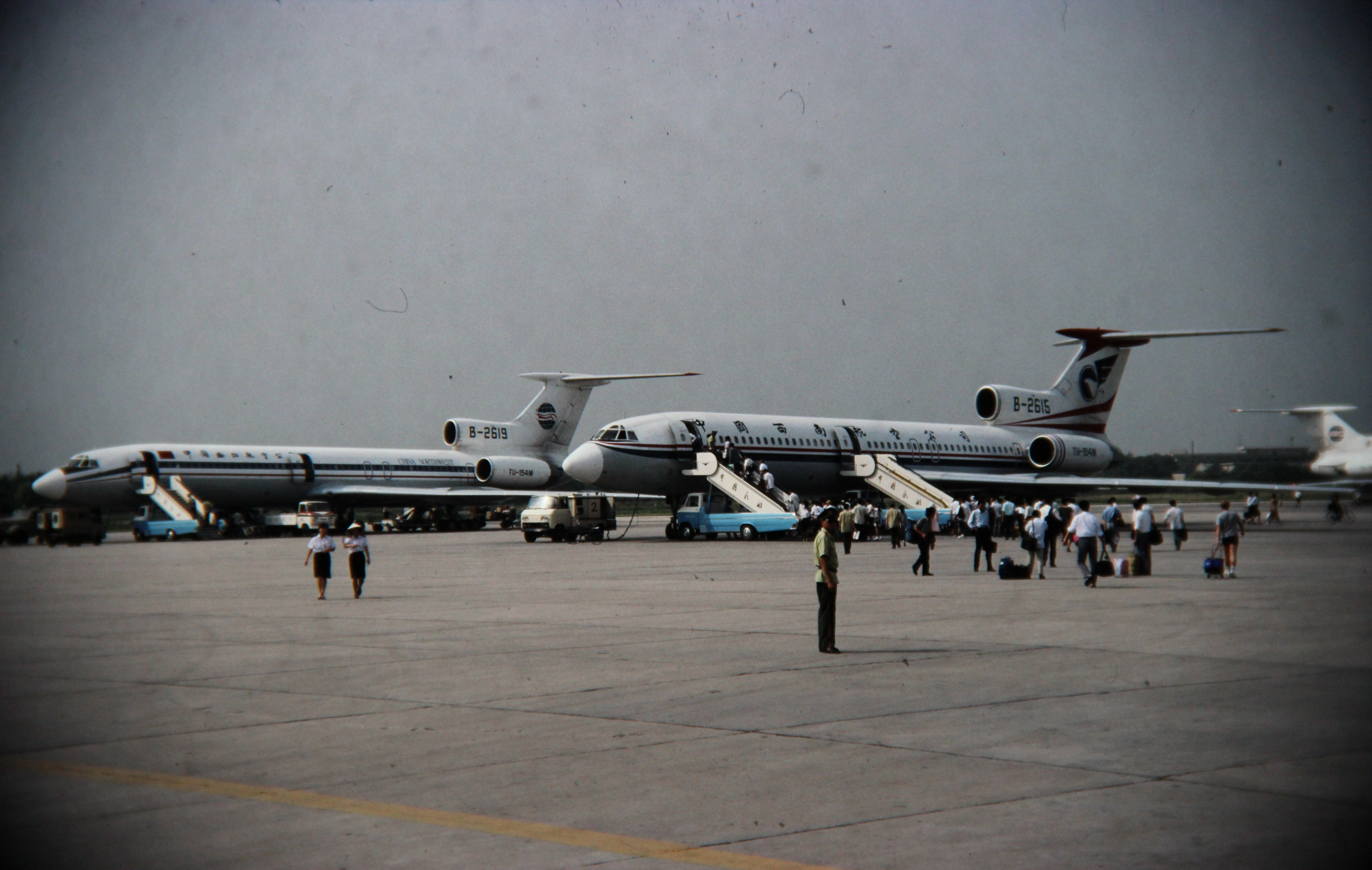
China Northwest Airlines's aircraft at the airline's main hub Xi'an Xianyang International Airport in 1991.

China Southwest Airlines
- Simplified Chinese: 中国西北航空公司
- Traditional Chinese: 中國西北航空公司
Transcriptions
Standard Mandarin
- Hanyu Pinyin: Zhōngguó xīběi hángkōng gōngsī

In 1988, the State Council decided to split CAAC into six separate airlines, of which China Northwest was one of them. The airline was based in Xi'an. It operated mostly domestic routes but also a handful of international flights to Japan.

In 1996, the airline acquired 80% of Nanjing Airlines. In October 2000, China Northwest Airlines and Shandong Airlines initialed a letter of intent for a joint merger, however, this was not approved by the Civil Aviation Administration of China. By then the airline was making a loss, and was later acquired by China Eastern Airlines in 2002. After the acquisition the airline was renamed China Eastern Xi Bei.

== Destinations ==
The following is a incomplete list of destinations served by China Northwest Airlines:

Country	City	Airport	Notes
China	Beihai	Beihai Fucheng Airport	
China	Beijing	Beijing Capital International Airport	
China	Changsha	Changsha Huanghua International Airport	
China	Chengdu	Chengdu Shuangliu International Airport	
China	Chongqing	Chongqing Jiangbei International Airport	
China	Dunhuang	Dunhuang Mogao International Airport	
China	Fuzhou	Fuzhou Changle International Airport	
China	Fuzhou	Fuzhou Yixu Airport	Airport closed
China	Golmud	Golmud Airport	
China	Guangzhou	Guangzhou Baiyun International Airport	
China	Guilin	Guilin Liangjiang International Airport	
China	Guilin	Guilin Qifengling Airport	Airport closed
China	Guiyang	Guiyang Longdongbao International Airport	
China	Haikou	Haikou Dayingshan Airport	Airport closed
China	Haikou	Haikou Meilan International Airport	
China	Hangzhou	Hangzhou Jianqiao Airport	
China	Hangzhou	Hangzhou Xiaoshan International Airport	
China	Harbin	Harbin Taiping International Airport	
China	Hefei	Hefei Luogang Airport	
China	Hong Kong	Hong Kong International Airport	
China	Hong Kong	Kai Tak Airport	Airport closed
China	Jiayuguan City	Jiayuguan Jiuquan Airport	
China	Jiuquan	Jiayuguan Jiuquan Airport	
China	Kunming	Kunming Wujiaba International Airport	
China	Lanzhou	Lanzhou Zhongchuan International Airport	Hub
China	Lianyungang	Lianyungang Baitabu Airport	
China	Macau	Macau International Airport	
China	Nanchang	Nanchang Changbei International Airport	
China	Nanchang	Nanchang Xiangtang Airport	
China	Nanjing	Nanjing Dajiaochang Airport	Airport closed
China	Nanjing	Nanjing Lukou International Airport	Hub
China	Ningbo	Ningbo Lishe International Airport	
China	Qingdao	Qingdao Liuting International Airport	
China	Quanzhou	Quanzhou Jinjiang International Airport	
China	Shanghai	Shanghai Hongqiao International Airport	
China	Shanghai	Shanghai Pudong International Airport	
China	Shantou	Shantou Waisha Airport	
China	Shenzhen	Shenzhen Bao'an International Airport	
China	Taiyuan	Taiyuan Wusu International Airport	
China	Ürümqi	Ürümqi Tianshan International Airport	
China	Wenzhou	Wenzhou Longwan International Airport	
China	Wuhan	Wuhan Tianhe International Airport	
China	Wuhan	Wuhan Wangjiadun Airport	Airport closed
China	Wuyishan City	Wuyishan Airport	
China	Xi'an	Xi'an Xiguan Airport	Airport closed
China	Xi'an	Xi'an Xianyang International Airport	Hub
China	Xiamen	Xiamen Gaoqi International Airport	
China	Xining	Xining Caojiapu International Airport	
China	Xuzhou	Xuzhou Daguozhuang Airport	
China	Xuzhou	Xuzhou Guanyin International Airport	
China	Yantai	Yantai Laishan Airport	
China	Yinchuan	Yinchuan Hedong International Airport	
China	Yinchuan	Yinchuan Xihuayuan Airport	
China	Zhanjiang	Zhanjiang Airport	
China	Zhengzhou	Zhengzhou Dongjiao Airport	Airport closed
China	Zhengzhou	Zhengzhou Xinzheng International Airport	
China	Zhuhai	Zhuhai Jinwan Airport	Hub
Japan	Fukuoka	Fukuoka Airport	
Japan	Hiroshima	Hiroshima Airport	
Japan	Nagoya	Nagoya Airfield	
Japan	Naha	Naha Airport	
Japan	Niigata	Niigata Airport	

== Fleet ==
=== Final fleet ===
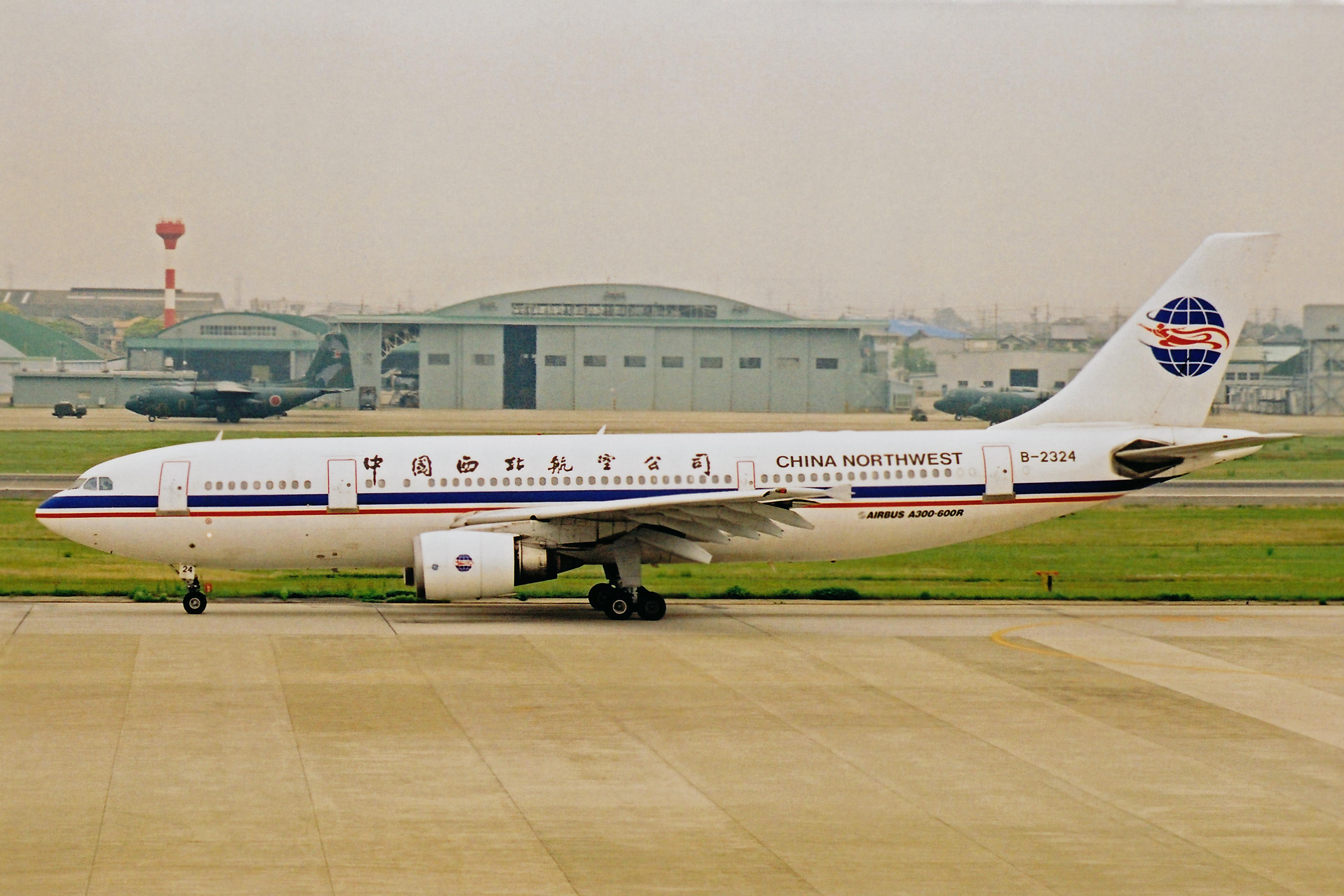
A China Northwest Airbus A300 at Nagoya Airport.

At the time that China Northwest merged into China Eastern, the airline's fleet consisted of the following aircraft:

Aircraft	Total	Orders
Airbus A300-600R	3	—
Airbus A310-200	3	—
Airbus A320-200	15	—
British Aerospace 146	10	—
Total	31	—

=== Fleet history ===
Throughout the airline's history, the airline had operated:

Aircraft	Total	Introduced	Retired	Notes
Airbus A300-600R	5	1992	2002	
Airbus A310-200	3	1992	2002	
Airbus A320-200	15	1997	2002	
British Aerospace 146	11	1989	2002	
Ilyushin IL-18	1	1989	1989	
Tupolev Tu-154	15	1989	1998	
Xian Y-7	2	1992	1996	

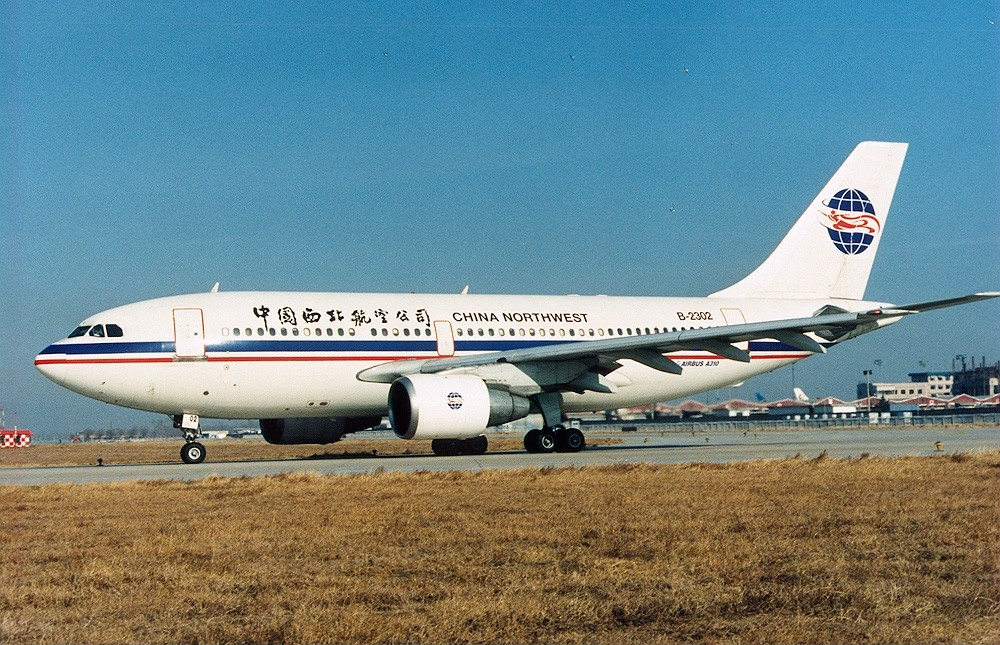
China Northwest Airlines Airbus A310-200 in 1995

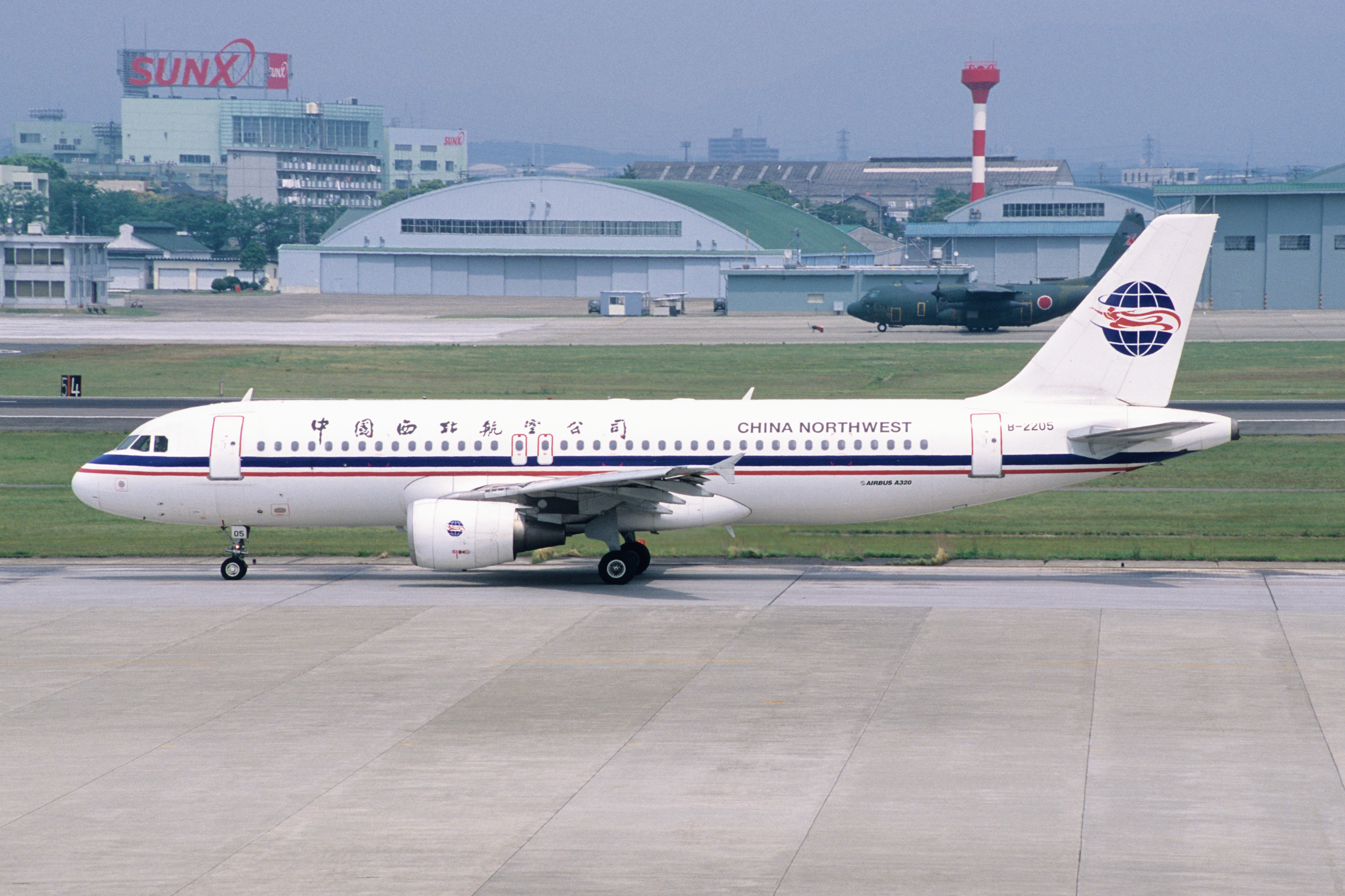
China Northwest Airlines Airbus A320-200

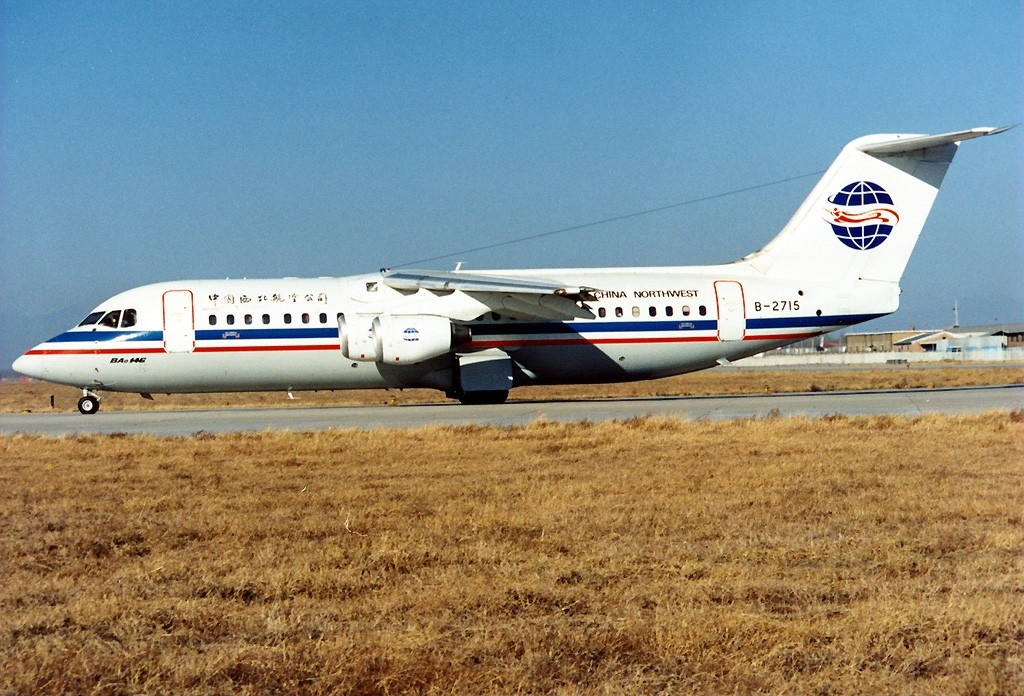
China Northwest Airlines British Aerospace 146 in 1995

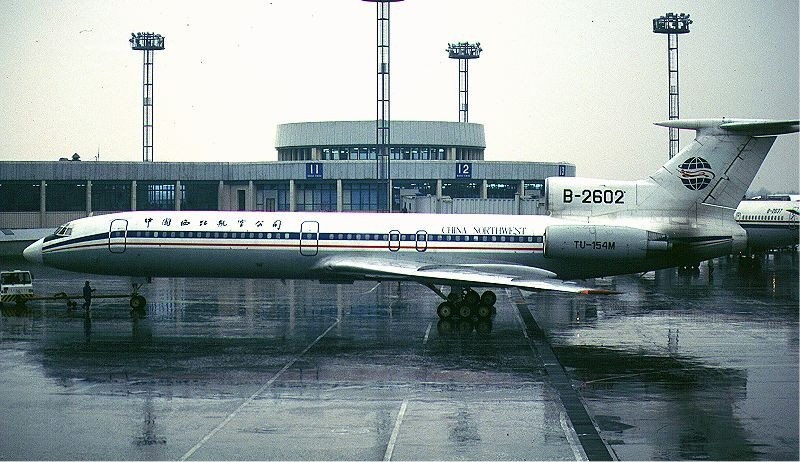
China Northwest Airlines Tupolev Tu-154 in 1997

== Incidents and accidents ==
- On July 23, 1993, Flight 2119 crashed while attempting to take off at Yinchuan Xihuayuan Airport, Ningxia, killing 54 passengers and 1 crew member on board.
- On June 6, 1994, Flight 2303 broke apart and crashed while flying between Xi'an and Guangzhou, killing all 160 people on board. This remains the deadliest aviation accident to occur in mainland China.
