= Linhe, Ningxia =

Linhe 临河镇
- Town
- Location in Ningxia
- Coordinates: 38.3529°N 106.4139°E
- Country: People's Republic of China
- Autonomous region: Ningxia
- Prefecture-level city: Yinchuan
- County-level city: Lingwu
- Time zone: UTC+8 (China Standard)

Linhe (simplified Chinese: 临河; traditional Chinese: 臨河; pinyin: Línhé) is a town under the administration of Lingwu, Ningxia, China. As of 2018, it has seven villages under its administration.

It is the site of the Yinchuan Hedong Airport.
