= Yinchuan Xihuayuan Airport =

Airport in People's Republic of China

Yinchuan Xihuayuan Airport 银川西花园机场
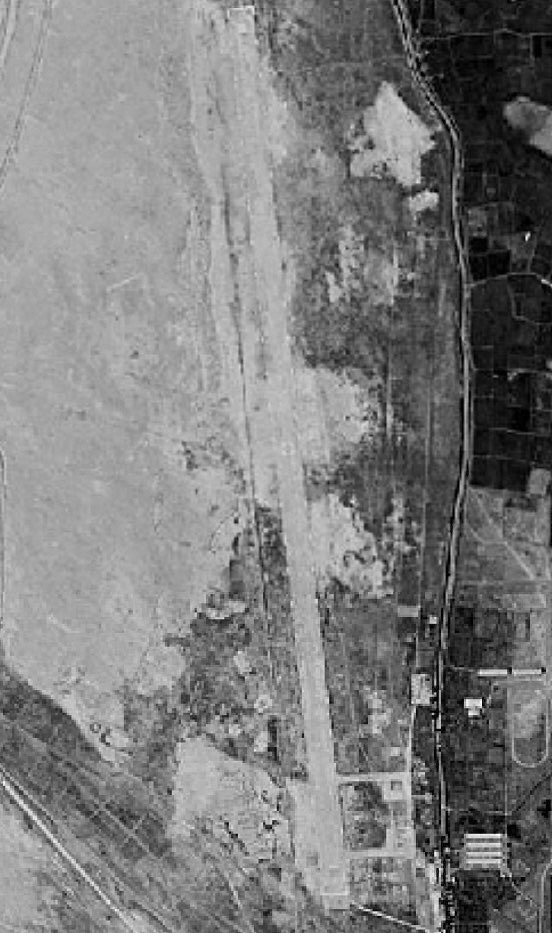
- Aerial imagery of Yinchuan Xihuayuan Airfield captured by KH-7 on 15 August, 1964.
- IATA: none; ICAO: none

Summary
- Airport type: Defunct
- Opened: 1935
- Closed: September 1997
- Coordinates: 38.501282°N 106.144622°E

Map
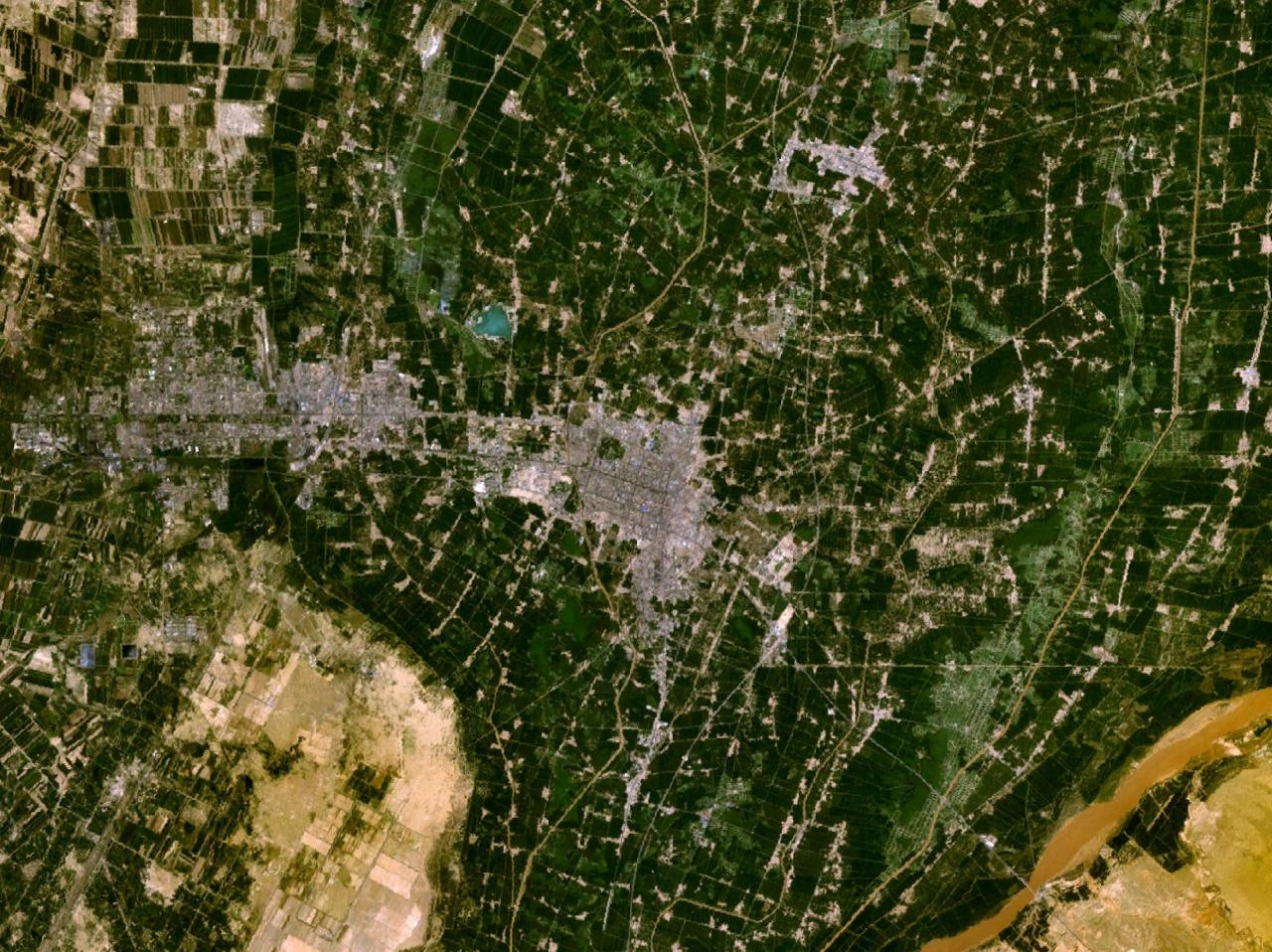
- Location of the former airport in Yinchuan

Runways
Direction	Length		Surface
Direction	ft	m	Surface
18/36	7,087	2,160	Gravel

Yinchuan Xihuayuan Airport was the former main airport of Yinchuan, Ningxia, China. It was built on orders of Ningxia governor Ma Hongkui in 1935 as a military airport with a gravel runway. The airport was closed from September 1949 to September 1958. In 1958, the airport was renovated to welcome the establishment of the Ningxia Hui Autonomous Region, of which Yinchuan became the capital. After the renovation, the Xihuayuan Airport had a gravel runway with a length of 1415 meters and a width of 40 meters. On 20 October 1958, a CAAC Il-14 passenger plane landed at the airport, marking the official resumption of flights at the airport.

In September 1986, the airport was expanded and became a 3C-class airport, being able to handle aircraft like the BAe 146 under 50 tons. The airport ceased operations in September 1997 due to the facilities being in need of upgrading and lack of expansion room. Its function was taken over by Yinchuan Hedong Airport.

The airport was the only airport in China serving a provincial capital that still had a gravel runway. At night, the runway was lit using lanterns, and during the rainy season the airport would often flood.

The airport terminal was preserved as a protected cultural heritage site by the Yinchuan Cultural Relics Department.

== Airlines and destinations ==
Airlines	Destinations
CAAC	Baotou, Beijing, Lanzhou/Gongxingdun, Lanzhou/Zhongchuan
China Northwest Airlines	Beijing/Capital, Foshan, Taiyuan, Xi'an/Xiguan, Xi'an/Xianyang

== Accidents ==
On July 23, 1993, China Northwest Airlines Flight 2119 crashed into a lake and broke apart while attempting its second takeoff from the airport. At least 59 of the 113 persons aboard the aircraft were killed.
