= China Northwest Airlines Flight 2119 =

1993 aviation accident

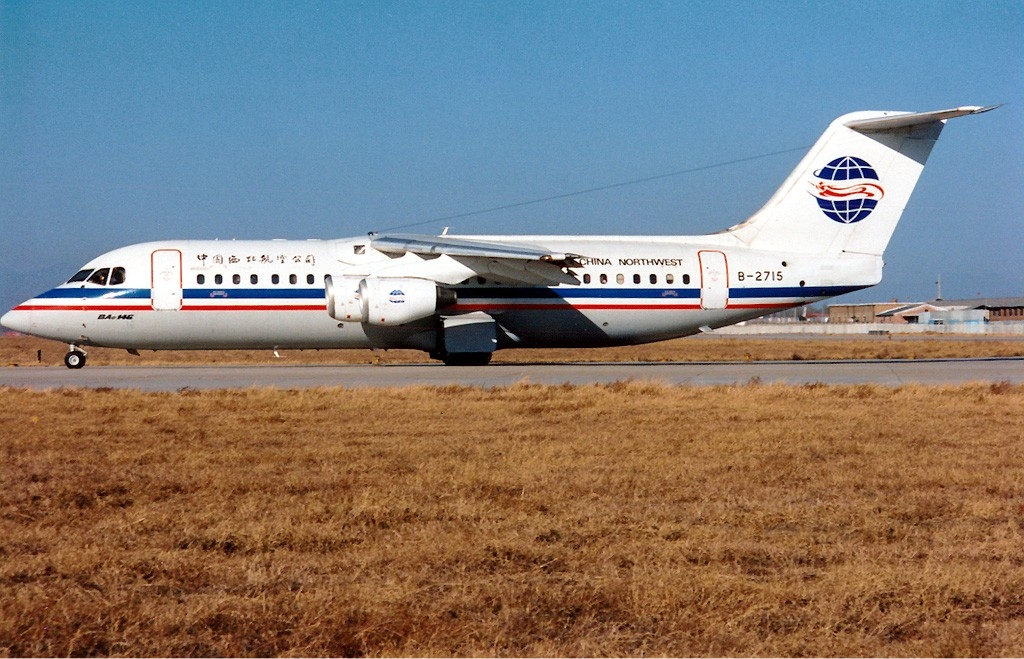
- A China Northwest BAe 146-300 similar to the one involved

Accident
- Date: July 23, 1993
- Summary: Crashed after aborted takeoff due to mechanical failure
- Site: Yinchuan Xihuayuan Airport, Yinchuan, Ningxia, China

Aircraft
- Aircraft type: BAe 146-300
- Operator: China Northwest Airlines
- IATA flight No.: WH2119
- ICAO flight No.: CNW2119
- Call sign: CHINA NORTHWEST 2119
- Registration: B-2716
- Flight origin: Yinchuan Xihuayuan Airport
- Destination: Beijing Capital International Airport
- Occupants: 113
- Passengers: 108
- Crew: 5
- Fatalities: 55
- Injuries: 52
- Survivors: 58

China Northwest Airlines Flight 2119 (WH2119) was a domestic flight from Yinchuan Xihuayuan Airport, Ningxia to Beijing Capital International Airport, China. On July 23, 1993, the BAe 146-300 crashed into a lake after it was unable to get airborne while attempting to take off at Yinchuan Airport, killing 54 passengers and 1 crew member on board.

== Accident ==
Just before rotation on takeoff, the right-side flap actuator failed, causing the flaps to retract. Unable to get the aircraft into the air, the crew had no other option but to abort the takeoff. This failed, however; the nose gear lifted off causing the tail to strike the runway. The aircraft then overran the runway and crashed into a lake.

== Cause ==
It was suspected that the crew failed to check if the flaps were deployed properly for takeoff.

== See also ==
- List of accidents and incidents involving commercial aircraft
