= Yinchuan Hedong International Airport =

Airport at Yinchuan, China

Yinchuan Hedong International Airport 银川河东国际机场
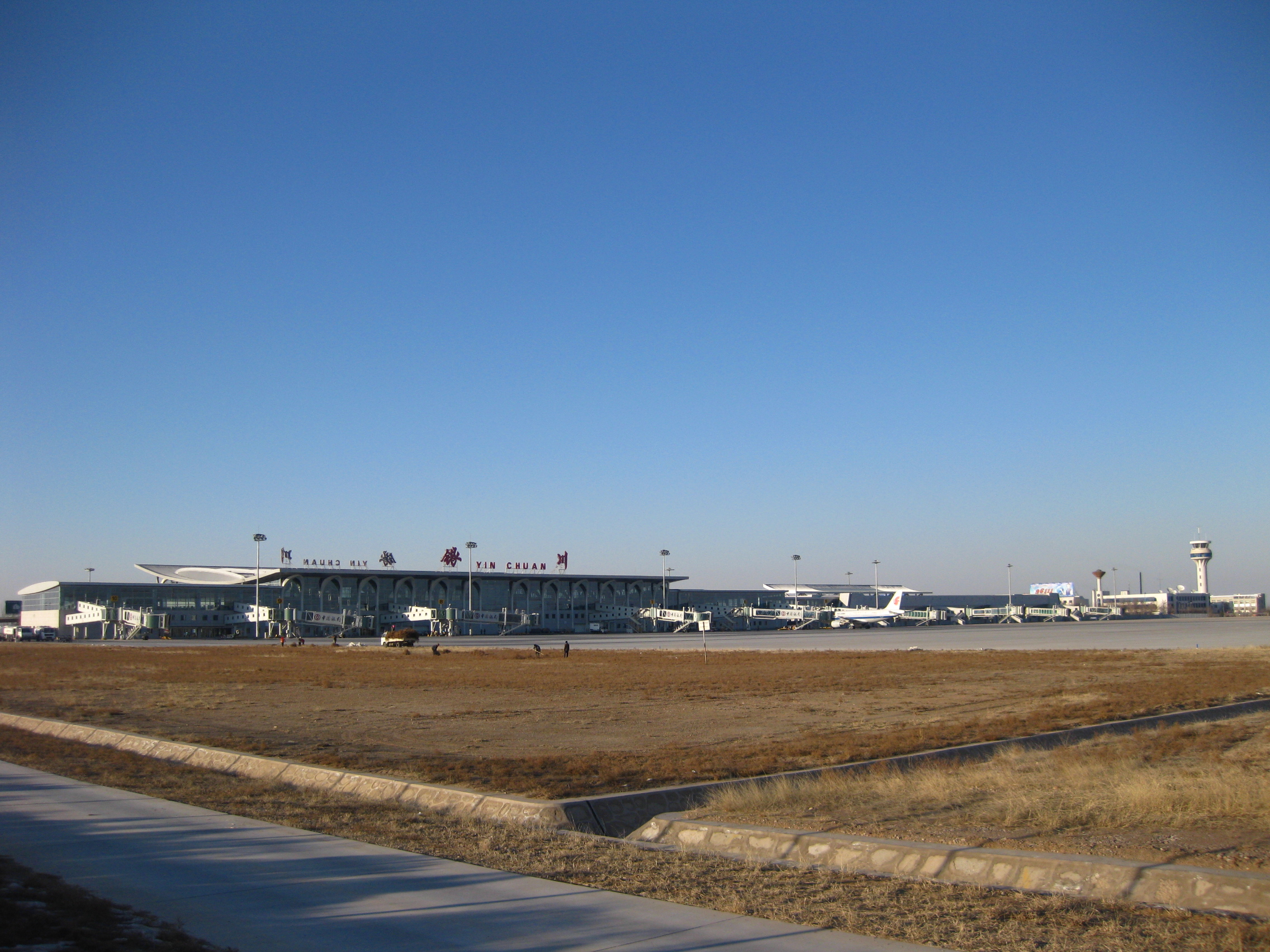
- IATA: INC; ICAO: ZLIC

Summary
- Airport type: Public
- Operator: Government
- Serves: Yinchuan, Ningxia
- Location: Linhe, Lingwu, Ningxia
- Opened: 6 September 1997; 29 years ago
- Elevation AMSL: 1,141 m (3,743 ft)
- Coordinates: 38°19′18″N 106°23′33″E
- Website: ningxia.cwag.com

Maps
- CAAC airport chart
- Location in Ningxia INC/ZLIC (China)

Runways
| Direction | Length | | Surface |
| Direction | m | ft | Surface |
|---|---|---|---|
| 03/21 | 3,200 | 10,499 | Concrete |

Statistics (2025)
- Passenger: 9,860,514
- Aircraft movements: 75,327
- Freight (in tonnes): 49,713.7
- List of the busiest airports in China

Yinchuan Hedong International Airport
- Simplified Chinese: 银川河东国际机场
- Traditional Chinese: 銀川河東國際機場
Transcriptions
Standard Mandarin
- Hanyu Pinyin: Yínchuān Hédōng Guójì Jīchǎng

Yinchuan Hedong International Airport (IATA: INC, ICAO: ZLIC) is the primary airport serving Yinchuan, the capital of Ningxia Hui Autonomous Region, People's Republic of China. It is located 25 kilometres (16 mi) southeast of downtown Yinchuan in the town of Linghe of Lingwu City. A relatively small airport compared to many airports in China, it nevertheless is the autonomous region's main aviation gateway. Its name "Hedong" literally means "East of the River" and derives from the airport's location east of the Yellow River. It is connected to 57 cities by either direct flights, or transferring in Xi'an and Beijing. The terminal building covers a total area of 15,000 square metres (160,000 sq ft).

Hedong Airport serves as an important alternate airport for both Lanzhou Zhongchuan Airport and Xi'an Xianyang International Airport. Currently, Hedong Airport covers an area of 124,000 square meters and is classified as a 4E civil airport. It has a runway that is 3,600 meters long and 45 meters wide. In 2016, Hedong Airport handled 52,500 flight movements, with a passenger throughput of 6.33 million and a cargo and mail throughput of 36,700 tons.

The passenger movements of Yinchuan Hedong International Airport in 2025 were 9,860,514, making it the 42^{nd} busiest airport in China.

== History ==
Hedong Airport was constructed after Yinchuan Xihuayuan Airport became constrained in expanding and modernizing. The first test flight was on 21 August 1997, and the airport was officially opened on 6 September that same year.

On June 5, 2008, the T2 terminal of Yinchuan Hedong Airport was officially opened.

On July 23, 2013, the Civil Aviation Administration of China approved the renaming of "Yinchuan Hedong Airport" to "Yinchuan Hedong International Airport," with the English name officially designated as "Yinchuan Hedong International Airport."

On August 24, 2015, the Northwest Regional Administration issued the civil airport usage permit, officially upgrading Yinchuan Hedong International Airport's flight zone classification to 4E, making it the third 4E airport in Northwest China.

On December 27, 2016, the T3 terminal of Yinchuan Hedong International Airport was officially put into operation, and the T2 terminal was closed for renovation.

On February 8, 2018, the new international hall (T2 terminal) of Yinchuan Hedong International Airport was officially opened, and the original international hall (T1 terminal) was closed.

On December 7, 2019, Yinchuan Hedong International Airport joined the ranks of airports with over 10 million passengers annually.

On December 29, 2019, with the opening of the Yinchuan–Lanzhou high-speed railway, the Hedong Airport railway station on the west side of the airport terminal began operation.

In 2013, the airport handled 4,247,843 passengers; in 2017, the airport handled 67,079 flights, almost 8 million passengers, and 40,000 tons of cargo.

== Airport facilities ==
=== Airport terminals ===
Yinchuan Hedong Airport currently operates three terminals: T1, T2, and T3, along with four satellite terminals: Binhe Satellite Terminal, Yuehai City Terminal, Yanchi City Terminal, and Xinhua Lian City Terminal.

Interior of Terminal 2

Terminal 1 was renovated and completed on January 18, 2010, and handles international, Hong Kong, Macau, and Taiwan flights.

Terminal 2 was opened in June 2008, with a total construction area of approximately 32,837 square meters. The airside is equipped with six jet bridges, and the landside features a viaduct with a total length of 558 meters. Currently, Terminal 2 is closed for renovation.

Terminal 3 was put into operation on December 27, 2016, with a total construction area of about 82,000 square meters. It has two floors above ground and a partial basement level, designed to handle an annual passenger throughput of 16 million and a cargo throughput of 100,000 tons.

The first floor (arrival level) covers 20,000 square meters and mainly houses the arrival hall, baggage claim, and baggage screening areas. The second floor (departure level) covers 35,000 square meters. The ticketing hall is equipped with 36 check-in counters, 30 self-check-in kiosks, and 12 security lanes.

Commercial areas are located at both ends of the terminal, with a mezzanine in the middle used for offices and a first-class lounge. The first-class lounge offers dining, business, and audiovisual facilities, providing premium services for high-end business travelers. The departure hall has 12 boarding bridges.

=== Satellite terminals ===
The Binhe Satellite Terminal began operations on June 16, 2012. Located 2 kilometers from Terminal 2 of Yinchuan Hedong Airport and situated by the Yellow River, it offers services such as flight inquiries, check-in, and VIP shuttle transfers to and from the airport. The terminal also includes facilities for dining, leisure, shopping, and sightseeing.

The Yuehai City Terminal started service on January 20, 2016. It is the first city terminal built and operated by Ningxia Airport Company and is located at the southeast corner of the Yuehai New World Shopping Plaza, approximately 19 kilometers from the airport.

The Yanchi City Terminal opened on August 26, 2016, and is the first off-site city terminal established by the Ningxia Airport Company. It is located on Yanzhou South Road in Yanchi County and covers an area of nearly 400 square meters. The terminal provides integrated services including flight information, ticketing, check-in, waiting areas, airport bus connections, travel consultation and booking, and local specialty sales.

The Xinhua Lian City Terminal and Air-Rail Interchange Center began operation on September 9, 2017. This terminal is the second city terminal in Yinchuan, following the Yuehai New World City Terminal. The opening of this terminal and its shuttle bus service to Yinchuan Railway Station fills a transportation gap and serves as an important hub for passenger travel and logistics along the Hohhot–Baotou–Yinchuan–Lanzhou railway corridor.

== Airlines and destinations ==
=== Passenger ===
| Airlines | Destinations |
|---|---|
| 9 Air | Guangzhou, Guiyang, Kuala Lumpur–International, Singapore |
| Air China | Beijing–Capital, Beijing–Daxing, Chengdu–Shuangliu, Chengdu–Tianfu, Chongqing, Hangzhou, Hohhot, Hong Kong, Shanghai–Pudong, Tianjin |
| Air Guilin | Guilin, Zhuhai |
| Beijing Capital Airlines | Beijing–Daxing, Chengdu-Tianfu, Guangzhou, Haikou, Hangzhou, Nanjing, Qitai, Yan'an |
| China Eastern Airlines | Beijing–Daxing, Chengdu–Tianfu, Dalian, Enshi, Guangzhou, Hangzhou, Harbin, Hefei, Hohhot, Jiayuguan, Jinan, Kunming, Nanchang, Nanjing, Ordos, Qingdao, Shanghai–Hongqiao, Shanghai–Pudong, Shenyang, Shijiazhuang, Taiyuan, Wuhan, Xining, Yantai |
| China Express Airlines | Chongqing, Guiyang, Hami, Hanzhong |
| China Southern Airlines | Changsha, Guangzhou, Guiyang, Shenzhen, Wuhan |
| Chongqing Airlines | Guangzhou |
| Grand China Air | Beijing–Capital |
| GX Airlines | Taiyuan |
| Hainan Airlines | Chongqing, Haikou |
| Hebei Airlines | Beijing–Daxing, Guyuan, Hangzhou |
| LJ Air | Chongqing, Guiyang, Harbin |
| Loong Air | Aksu, Changchun, Changsha, Changzhou, Chengdu–Tianfu, Hangzhou, Jiaxing, Karamay, Kashgar, Linyi, Ningbo, Shanghai–Pudong, Urumqi, Wuhan, Xiangyang, Xuzhou |
| Lucky Air | Lijiang, Luzhou |
| Okay Airways | Changsha, Chongqing, Haikou, Nanning, Sanya, Urumqi |
| Ruili Airlines | Taiyuan, Xining |
| Shandong Airlines | Jinan, Qingdao, Tianjin, Urumqi, Xiamen, Xining, Zhengzhou |
| Shanghai Airlines | Shanghai–Hongqiao, Shanghai–Pudong, Wenzhou, Zhengzhou |
| Shenzhen Airlines | Nanjing, Shenzhen, Zhengzhou |
| Sichuan Airlines | Chengdu–Shuangliu, Chengdu–Tianfu, Chongqing, Dubai–International, Guilin, Kunming, Sanya |
| Spring Airlines | Nanchang, Shijiazhuang, Yangzhou |
| Tianjin Airlines | Dalian, Huizhou, Tangshan, Yichang, Yulin (Shaanxi) |
| Urumqi Air | Haikou, Wuhan, Urumqi, Zhanjiang |
| XiamenAir | Beijing–Daxing, Changsha, Fuzhou, Guangzhou, Hangzhou, Hefei, Hong Kong, Quanzhou, Shanghai–Pudong, Tianjin, Urumqi, Wuhan, Xiamen, Zhengzhou |

== Ground transportation ==
Airport Shuttle Bus

- Yinchuan Civil Aviation Building (Xingqing District) – Hedong Airport: ¥20.
- Wuzhong Hotel – Hedong Airport: Three round trips daily.
- Yuehai Urban Terminal – Hedong Airport: ¥20.

Taxi

- The base fare in Yinchuan is ¥7 for the first 3 km, and ¥1.4 per additional km.
- A taxi ride from the airport to the city center typically costs around ¥80.

Rail

- Hedong Airport railway station on the Yinchuan–Lanzhou high-speed railway (opened in 2019).

== See also ==
- List of airports in China
- List of airports in Ningxia (宁夏回族自治区机场列表)
- Yinchuan Museum of Contemporary Art, close to the airport
