= 2023 Yinchuan gas explosion =

Gas explosion in Ningxia, China

Yinchuan gas explosion
- 2023 Yinchuan gas explosion (China)
- Date: 21 June 2023
- Time: 20:40 (BJT, UTC+8)
- Location: Xingqing District, Yinchuan, Ningxia Hui Autonomous Region, China; 38°28′39″N 106°14′40″E
- Type: Gas explosion
- Cause: Leaking liquefied petroleum gas tank
- Deaths: 31
- Injuries: 7

On 21 June 2023, 31 people died and seven others were injured at the Fuyang Barbecue Restaurant (Chinese: 富洋烧烤店) in Xingqing District, Yinchuan, Ningxia Hui Autonomous Region, China, after a gas explosion occurred on the eve of the Dragon Boat Festival.

The explosion was the deadliest in China since 2019, when 78 died in a blast at a chemical plant in the eastern province of Jiangsu.

== Explosion ==
According to the state broadcaster China Central Television (CCTV), the explosion occurred at around 8:40 p.m. local time on a busy street, following a leak of a liquefied petroleum gas tank inside the kitchen of the restaurant. Authorities are investigating the exact cause of the leak.

Over a dozen firefighters battled the blaze while smoke billowed from a large opening in the front of the restaurant. The street was strewn with shards of glass and other debris. The Ministry of Emergency Management said that more than 100 personnel and 20 vehicles from fire and rescue services were deployed to the location. A video from the social media platform Douyin showed first responders with ladders, attempting to reach victims that were trapped on the second floor.

== Casualties ==
At least 31 people died in the explosion, with seven others injured. The casualties included high school students and retirees. Of those killed, many died by smoke inhalation.

== Aftermath ==
The provincial government relocated 64 families from neighboring residential compounds to hotels.

== Investigation ==
Local media reported that based on an initial inquiry by the fire department, an employee at the restaurant detected the odor of a gas leak approximately one hour prior to the explosion. Subsequently, the employee identified a damaged valve on a liquefied gas tank and was in the midst of replacing it when the blast occurred. Nine people, including the restaurant's owner, shareholders, and staff were held by police following the explosion while their financial assets were ordered frozen.

== Reactions ==
Yinchuan city government holds a press conference on the explosion.

General Secretary of the Communist Party Xi Jinping urged for utmost efforts in providing medical care to the injured. He ordered an "all-out rescue and treatment of the injured" and requested strengthened safety measures.

On 22 June 2023, Yinchuan authorities vowed to launch an investigation into relevant industries to avoid similar calamities in the future.
