= China Northwest Airlines Flight 2303 =

1994 aviation accident

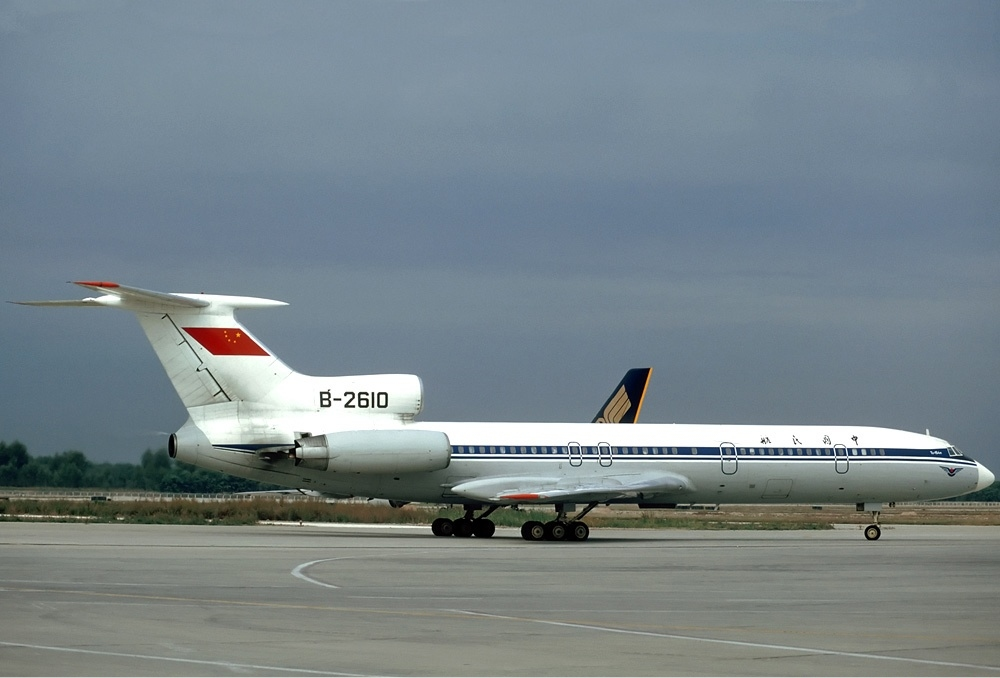
- B-2610, the aircraft involved, in CAAC livery in 1988

Accident
- Date: June 6, 1994
- Summary: In-flight break up due to improper maintenance
- Site: Near Xi'an, China; 34°16′N 108°54′E

Aircraft
- Aircraft type: Tupolev Tu-154M
- Operator: China Northwest Airlines
- IATA flight No.: WH2303
- ICAO flight No.: CNW2303
- Call sign: CHINA NORTHWEST 2303
- Registration: B-2610
- Flight origin: Xianyang Airport, China
- Destination: Guangzhou Baiyun International Airport (former), China
- Occupants: 160
- Passengers: 146
- Crew: 14
- Fatalities: 160
- Survivors: 0

China Northwest Airlines Flight 2303 was a domestic flight from Xi'an to Guangzhou, People's Republic of China. On June 6, 1994, the aircraft operating the flight, a Tupolev Tu-154M, broke up in-flight and crashed as a result of an autopilot malfunction which caused violent shaking and overstressed the airframe. All 160 people on board were killed. As of 2026, it remains the deadliest airplane crash ever in mainland China.

== Aircraft ==
The aircraft was a Tupolev Tu-154M (registration B-2610, factory 86A740, serial no. 0740). It was manufactured by the Kuibyshev Aviation Plant (KuAPO) on 22 December 1986 and was delivered to the Civil Aviation Administration of China (CAAC) few weeks later. In July 1988, due to reorganization, CAAC transferred the aircraft to China Northwest Airlines. The aircraft was powered with three Soloviev D-30KU-154-II low-bypass turbofan engines from the Rybinsk Engine Plant. On the day of the accident, the aircraft had 12,507 flying hours and 6,651 takeoff and landing cycles.

== Passengers and crew ==
=== Crew ===
The flight crew consisted of captain Li Gangqiang (Note: simplified Chinese: 李刚强; traditional Chinese: 李剛強; pinyin: Lǐ Gāngqiáng) (age 46), instructor captain Xin Tiancai (Note: Chinese: 辛天才; pinyin: Xīn Tiāncái) (47), first officer Yang Min (Note: simplified Chinese: 杨民; traditional Chinese: 楊民; pinyin: Yáng Mín) (25), navigator Zhang Nanjing (Note: simplified Chinese: 张南京; traditional Chinese: 張南京; pinyin: Zhāng Nánjīng) (34), and flight engineer Kang Youfa (Note: simplified Chinese: 康有发; traditional Chinese: 康有發; pinyin: Kāng Yǒufā) (47). There were also nine flight attendants on board.

=== Passengers ===
Nationality	Passengers	Crew	Total
China	133	14	147
Italy	4	0	4
Hong Kong	3	0	3
United States	2	0	2
United Kingdom	2	0	2
Taiwan	1	0	1
Switzerland	1	0	1
Total	146	14	160

== Accident ==
The aircraft took off from Xi'an Xianyang International Airport at 8:13 on June 6, 1994. At the time, it was raining, but this did not cause a delay in departure.

Twenty-four seconds after take-off, the crew reported that the aircraft was "floating" and making an abnormal sound, but were still able to maintain a speed of 400 km/h (220 kn; 250 mph). Three minutes after take-off, the plane flew over Xi'an City and turned southeast. The crew then reported an unstable pitch-up to 20° and 30° at 8:16:24 and 8:16:58, respectively.

At 8:17:06, while over Mingdu Township, Chang'an County, Shaanxi, the aircraft became unable to maintain its assigned altitude. The crew then temporarily engaged the autopilot, which unexpectedly caused the aircraft to turn right. At 8:22:27, with the aircraft travelling at 373 kilometres per hour (232 mph), the stall warning activated. The aircraft then banked dangerously to the left, and dropped from 4,717 metres (15,476 ft) to 2,884 metres (9,462 ft) in 12 seconds, at a speed of 747 km/h (403 kn; 464 mph).

At 8:22:42, the aircraft disintegrated in mid-air above the suburb of Tsuitou Village, Mingyu Township. All 146 passengers and 14 crew died, most on impact. Wreckage landed to the southeast of the airport, scattered over 18 miles (29 km) of farmland.

== Investigation ==
Poor maintenance was the probable cause of the accident. The previous evening, the autopilot yaw-channel had been erroneously connected to the bank control, and the bank-channel to the yaw controls, while undergoing maintenance at an unapproved facility. After takeoff, the faulty damper immediately caused the plane to experience violent roll oscillations, overstressing the airframe beyond its structural limits. This led to its break up in mid-air.

== Aftermath ==
This crash, as well as the crash of China Southwest Airlines Flight 4509 in 1999, resulted in China's decision to retire the Tupolev Tu-154. All Tu-154s in China were removed from service on October 30, 2002. In 2003, China Northwest airlines merged into China Eastern Airlines. Flight 2303 is still in use by China Eastern Airlines for their Xian-Guangzhou flight.

== See also ==
- Air Astana Flight 1388
