= Taizi Great Mosque =

Mosque in Yinchuan, Ningxia, China

- 台子清真大寺; تَيْ‌زِ ٿٍْ‌جٍ دَاسِْ
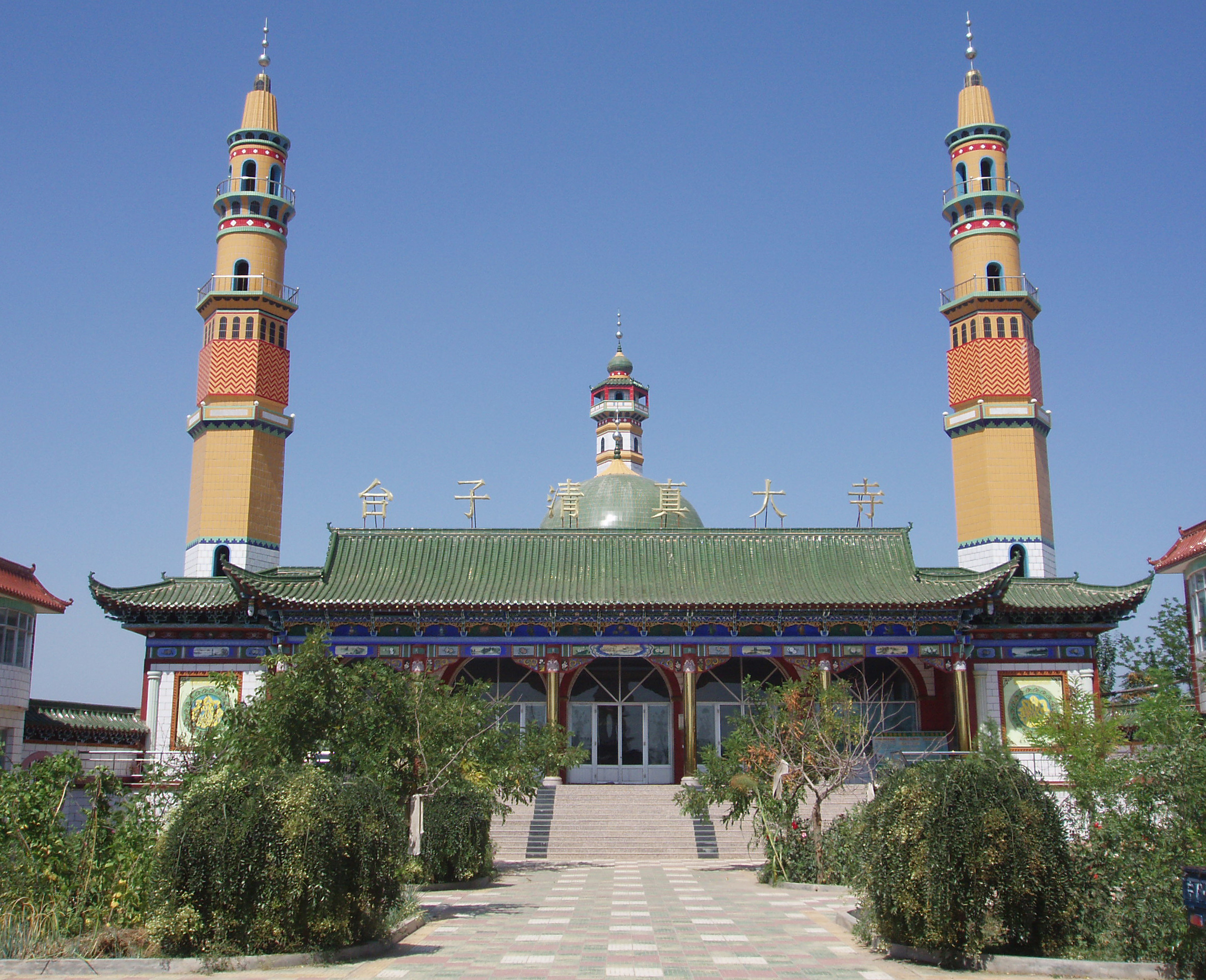

- Location of the mosque in Ningxia

Religion
- Affiliation: Sunni Islam
- Ecclesiastical or organizational status: Mosque
- Status: Active

Location
- Location: Yinchuan, Ningxia
- Country: China
- Interactive map of Taizi Great Mosque
- Coordinates: 38°02′47″N 106°18′21″E

Architecture
- Type: Mosque

Specifications
- Dome: 1
- Minaret: 2 (maybe more)

Chinese name
- Simplified Chinese: 台子清真大寺
Transcriptions
Standard Mandarin
- Hanyu Pinyin: Táizi Qīngzhēn Dàsì

The Taizi Great Mosque (Chinese: 台子清真大寺; pinyin: Táizi Qīngzhēn Dàsì; Chinese: تَيْ‌زِ ٿٍْ‌جٍ دَاسِْ) is a mosque in Yinchuan, in the Ningxia Hui Autonomous Region of China.

The mosque underwent four renovations between 1992 and 2006.

== See also ==
- Islam in China
- List of mosques in China
