= Xingqing, Yinchuan =

Xingqing 兴庆区 ثٍْ‌ٿٍْ ٿِيُوِ
- District
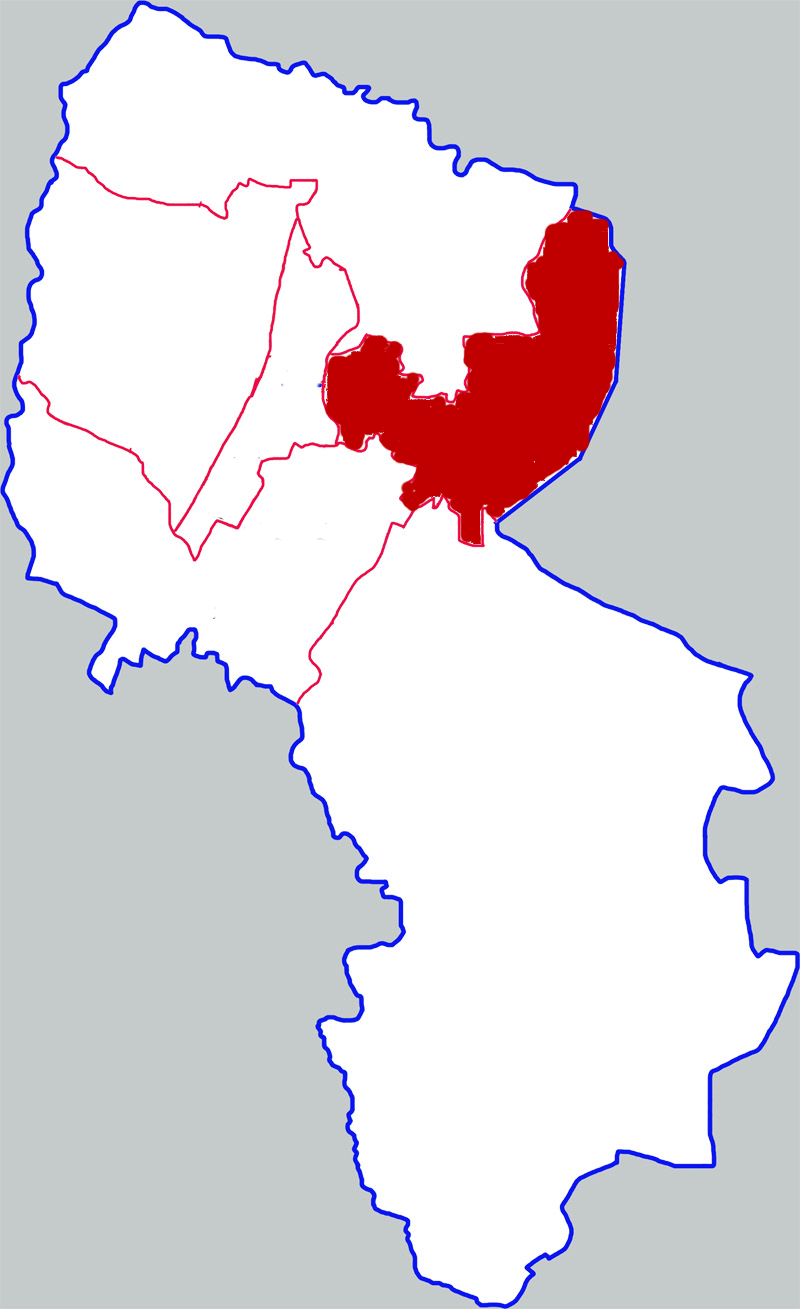
- Xingqing in Yinchuan

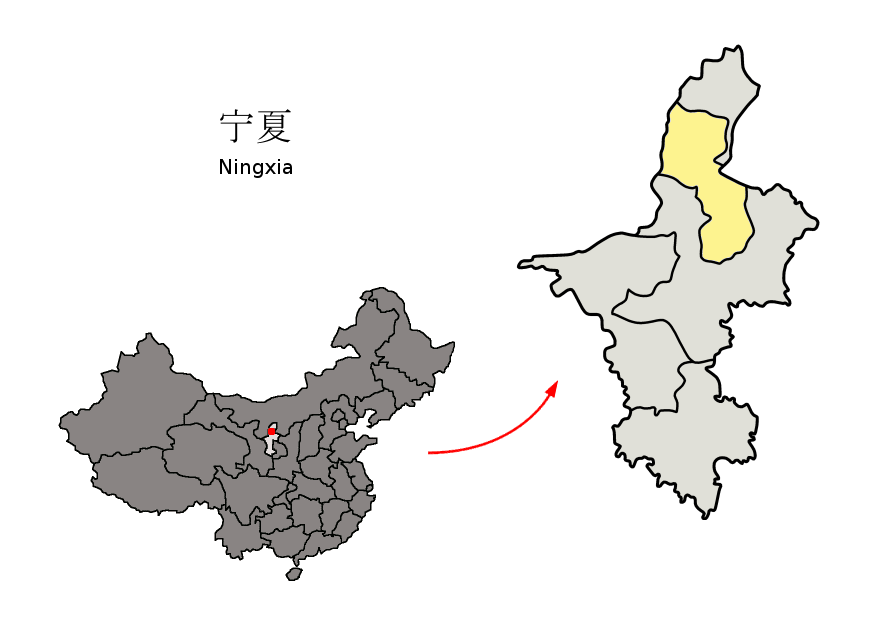
- Yinchuan in Ningxia
- Coordinates: 38°28′25″N 106°17′19″E
- Country: China
- Autonomous region: Ningxia
- Prefecture-level city: Yinchuan
- District seat: Yuhuanggebeijie Subdistrict

Area
  - Total: 648.08 km^{2} (250.23 sq mi)

Population (2020 census)
  - Total: 808,282
  - Density: 1,247.2/km^{2} (3,230.2/sq mi)
- Time zone: UTC+8 (China Standard)
- Postal code: 750004
- Website: www.xqq.gov.cn

Xingqing District (simplified Chinese: 兴庆区; traditional Chinese: 興慶區; pinyin: Xīngqìng Qū; Wade–Giles: Hsin-ch’ing Ch’ü, Xiao'erjing: ثٍْ‌ٿٍْ ٿِيُوِ) is one of three urban districts of the prefecture-level city of Yinchuan, the capital of Ningxia Hui Autonomous Region, Northwest China, bordering Inner Mongolia to the east. It has a total area of 757.6 km^{2} (292.5 sq mi), and, according to the 2010 China Census, a population of 678,306 people, 85,000 of which are of the Hui nationality.

Xingqing District is the political, economic, scientific, cultural, financial, and commercial center of Yinchuan. The district government is located on East Beijing Road. The 2023 Yinchuan gas explosion occurred in the district.

== Administrative divisions ==
Xingqing District is divided into 11 subdistricts, 2 towns and 2 townships:

- Fenghuangbeijie Subdistrict (凤凰北街街道, فٍْ‌خُوَانْ بِيْ ڭِيَ ڭِيَ‌دَوْ)
- Jiefangxijie Subdistrict (解放西街街道, ڭِيَ‌فَانْ ثِ ڭِيَ ڭِيَ‌دَوْ)
- Wenhuajie Subdistrict (文化街街道, وٌخُوَا ڭِيَ ڭِيَ‌دَوْ)
- Funingjie Subdistrict (富宁街街道, فُ‌نِئٍ ڭِيَ ڭِيَ‌دَوْ)
- Xinhuajie Subdistrict (新华街街道, ثٍ‌خُوَا ڭِيَ ڭِيَ‌دَوْ)
- Yuhuanggebeijie Subdistrict (玉皇阁北街街道, ۋِخُوَانْ‌قْ بِيْ ڭِيَ ڭِيَ‌دَوْ)
- Qianjinjie Subdistrict (前进街街道, ٿِيًاڭٍ ڭِيَ ڭِيَ‌دَوْ)
- Zhongshannanjie Subdistrict (中山南街街道, جْوشًا نًا ڭِيَ ڭِيَ‌دَوْ)
- Yingulu Subdistrict (银古路街道, ءٍقُ لُ ڭِيَ‌دَوْ)
- Shenglijie Subdistrict (胜利街街道, شٍْ‌لِ ڭِيَ ڭِيَ‌دَوْ)
- Lijingjie Subdistrict (丽景街街道, لَ‌ڭٍْ ڭِيَ ڭِيَ‌دَوْ)
- Zhangzheng Town (掌政镇)
- Daxin Town (大新镇)
- Tonggui Township (通贵乡)
- Yueyahu Township (月牙湖乡)
