= Lingwu =

Lingwu 灵武市 · لِئٍ‌وُ شِ
- County-level city
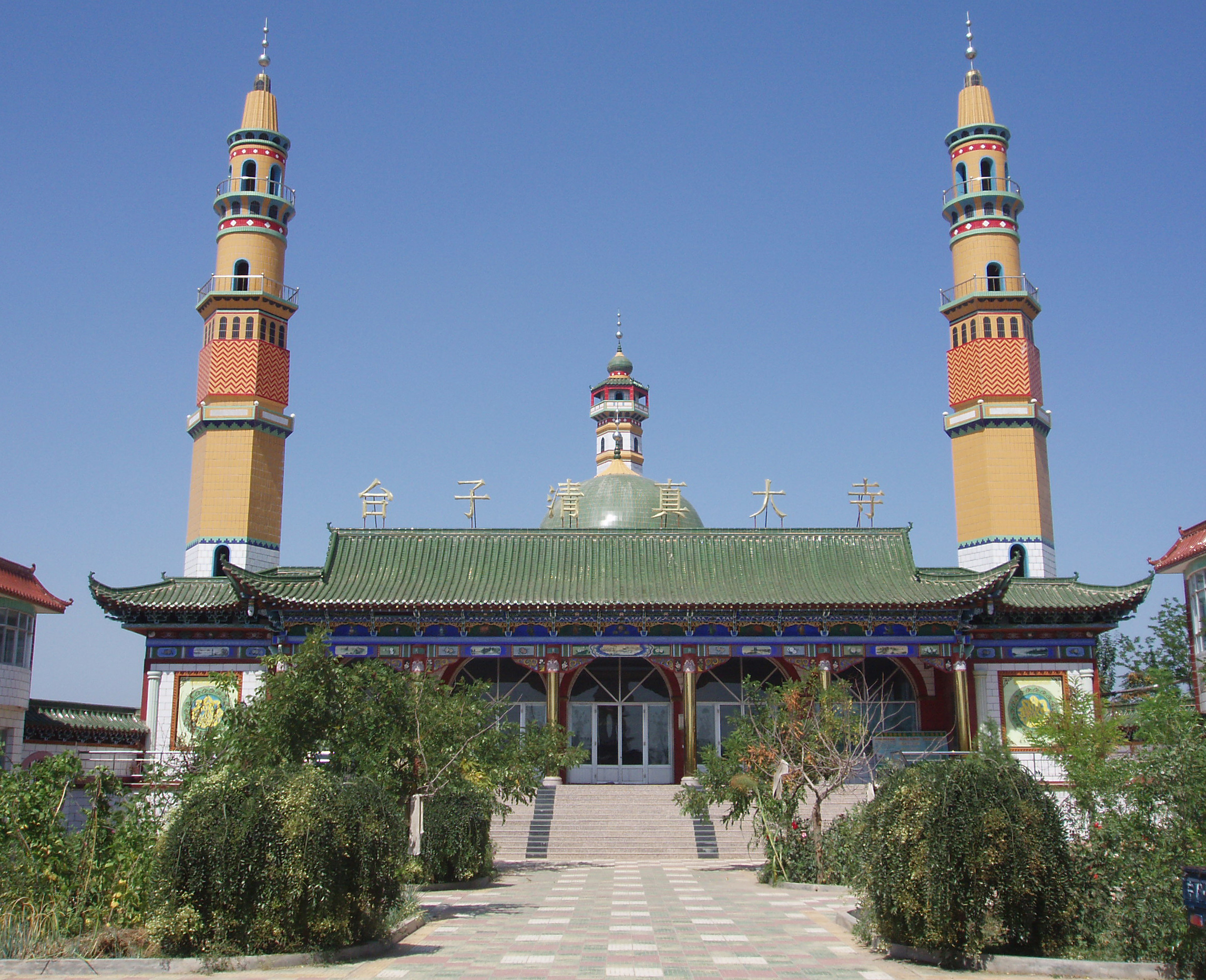
- Taizi Great Mosque

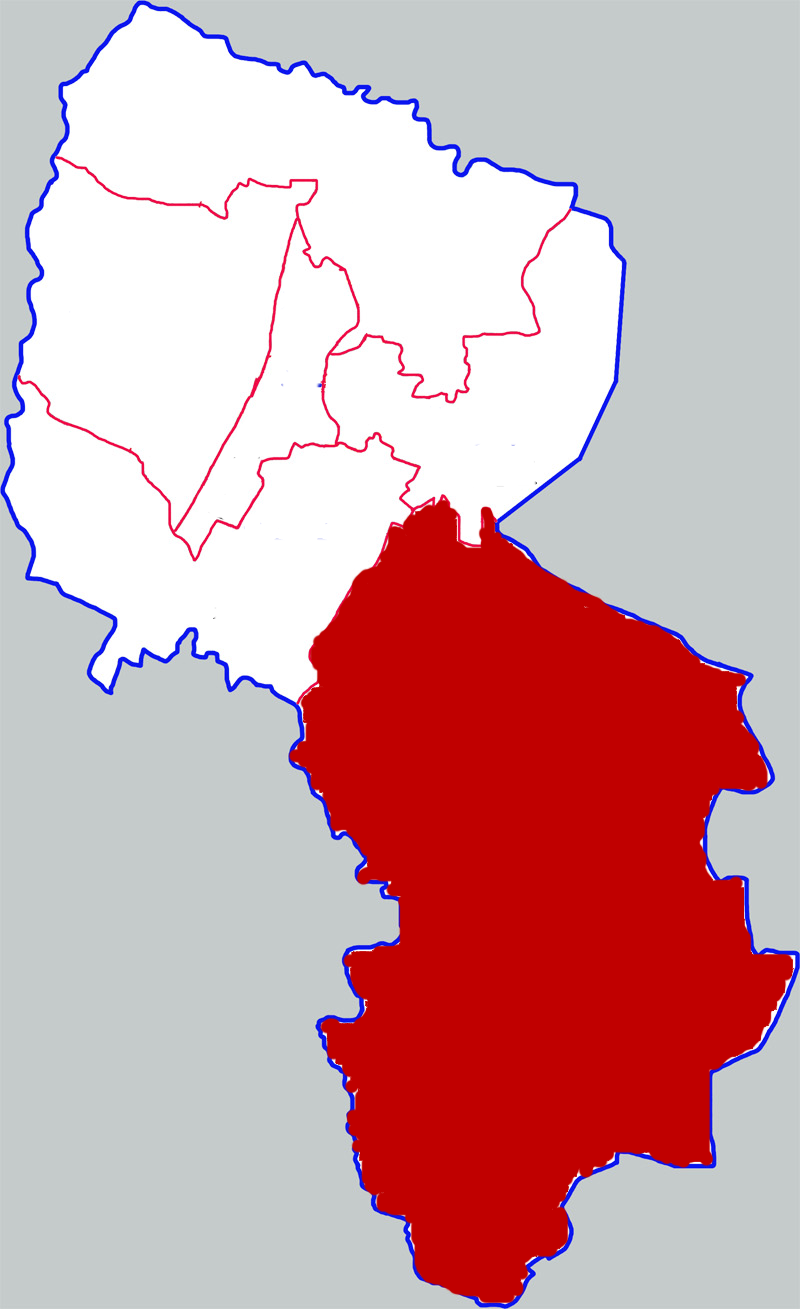
- Location of Lingwu in Yinchuan

- Location in Ningxia
- Coordinates: 38.103°N 106.340°E
- Country: China
- Region: Ningxia
- Prefecture-level city: Yinchuan
- Municipal seat: Chengqu Subdistrict

Area
  - Total: 3,009.04 km^{2} (1,161.80 sq mi)

Population (2010 census)
  - Total: 261,677
  - Density: 86.9636/km^{2} (225.235/sq mi)
- Time zone: UTC+8 (China Standard)

Lingwu (simplified Chinese: 灵武市; traditional Chinese: 靈武市; pinyin: Língwǔ Shì, Xiao'erjing: لِئٍ‌وُ شِ) is a county-level city of Ningxia Hui Autonomous Region, Northwest China, it is under the administration of the prefecture-level city of Yinchuan. It is the most important industrial city of Ningxia. Lingwu spans an area of 3,846 square kilometres (1,485 mi^{2}), and according to the 2010 Chinese census, Lingwu has a population of 261,677.

== Toponymy ==
Lingwu was historically known as Lingzhou (simplified Chinese: 灵州; traditional Chinese: 靈州; pinyin: Língzhōu, Xiao'erjing: لِئٍ‌جِوْ).

== History ==
During the Warring States period, the area was absorbed into the Qin dynasty under Beidi Commandery. The area was first incorporated into the Han dynasty in 191 BCE by Emperor Hui. In 437 CE, under the Northern Wei, the area was incorporated as Bogulu Town. In 526 CE, Bogulu Town was renamed as Lingzhou. In 756 CE, during the Tang dynasty, Emperor Suzong fled to Lingzhou during the Anshi Rebellion, where he ascended the throne with the aid of loyal bureaucrats and military supporters, only notifying his father Xuanzong after the fact. Lingzhou became part of the Western Xia in 1038. It was besieged by Genghis Khan in November 1226.

On May 20, 1996, Lingwu was upgraded from a county to a county-level city. On October 25, 2002, Lingwu was transferred from the prefecture-level city of Wuzhong to Yinchuan.

== Geography ==
The western border of Lingwu is formed by the Yellow River.

=== Climate ===
Lingwu's climate is arid, with little precipitation and high levels of sunshine.

Climate data for Lingwu, elevation 1,116 m (3,661 ft), (1991–2020 normals, extremes 1981–present)
Month	Jan	Feb	Mar	Apr	May	Jun	Jul	Aug	Sep	Oct	Nov	Dec	Year
Record high °C (°F)	12.9 (55.2)	21.1 (70.0)	27.1 (80.8)	34.3 (93.7)	36.0 (96.8)	36.6 (97.9)	37.5 (99.5)	36.3 (97.3)	35.2 (95.4)	29.0 (84.2)	24.3 (75.7)	16.0 (60.8)	37.5 (99.5)
Mean daily maximum °C (°F)	0.8 (33.4)	5.9 (42.6)	12.9 (55.2)	20.6 (69.1)	25.2 (77.4)	28.9 (84.0)	30.4 (86.7)	28.7 (83.7)	24.2 (75.6)	18.0 (64.4)	9.2 (48.6)	2.1 (35.8)	17.2 (63.0)
Daily mean °C (°F)	−7.0 (19.4)	−2.5 (27.5)	4.8 (40.6)	12.4 (54.3)	17.6 (63.7)	21.8 (71.2)	23.7 (74.7)	21.8 (71.2)	16.3 (61.3)	9.0 (48.2)	1.9 (35.4)	−5.0 (23.0)	9.6 (49.2)
Mean daily minimum °C (°F)	−13.3 (8.1)	−9.2 (15.4)	−2.1 (28.2)	4.3 (39.7)	9.4 (48.9)	14.2 (57.6)	17.1 (62.8)	15.5 (59.9)	9.8 (49.6)	2.0 (35.6)	−3.5 (25.7)	−10.5 (13.1)	2.8 (37.1)
Record low °C (°F)	−26.5 (−15.7)	−26.6 (−15.9)	−20.4 (−4.7)	−8.3 (17.1)	−3.1 (26.4)	4.3 (39.7)	8.8 (47.8)	4.8 (40.6)	−2.7 (27.1)	−11.6 (11.1)	−17.8 (0.0)	−25.1 (−13.2)	−26.6 (−15.9)
Average precipitation mm (inches)	1.3 (0.05)	2.1 (0.08)	5.2 (0.20)	11.1 (0.44)	19.4 (0.76)	27.4 (1.08)	39.0 (1.54)	40.9 (1.61)	30.1 (1.19)	12.1 (0.48)	4.4 (0.17)	1.0 (0.04)	194 (7.64)
Average precipitation days (≥ 0.1 mm)	1.5	1.1	2.3	3.6	4.7	5.9	7.5	7.9	6.6	4.1	1.9	0.9	48
Average snowy days	2.6	1.7	1.3	0.4	0	0	0	0	0	0.3	1.6	1.3	9.2
Average relative humidity (%)	53	46	42	39	48	57	65	70	71	64	60	56	56
Mean monthly sunshine hours	209.0	210.1	249.5	271.1	301.5	298.0	295.0	267.0	225.6	237.7	215.6	213.2	2,993.3
Percentage possible sunshine	68	68	67	68	68	68	66	64	61	69	72	72	68
Source: China Meteorological AdministrationAll-time Jun Record low

== Administrative divisions ==
Lingwu administers one subdistrict, six towns, two townships and one other township-level division.

=== Subdistricts ===
The city's sole subdistrict is:

- Chengqu Subdistrict (城区街道, چٍْ‌ٿِيُوِ ڭِيَ‌دَوْ).

=== Towns ===
The city's six towns are:

- Dongta (东塔镇, دْوتَا جٍ
- Haojiaqiao (郝家桥镇, خَوْڭِيَاٿِيَوْ جٍ)
- Chongxing (崇兴镇, چْوثٍْ جٍ)
- Ningdong (宁东镇, نِيٍ‌دْو جٍ)
- Majiatan (马家滩镇, مَاڭِيَاتًا جٍ), and
- Linhe (临河镇, لٍ‌حَ جٍ).

=== Townships ===
The city's two townships are:

- Wutongshu Township (梧桐树乡, وُطْوشُ ثِيَانْ), and
- Baitugang Township (白土岗乡, بَيْ‌تُ‌قَانْ ثِيَانْ).

=== Other township-level divisions ===
The city also administers the township-level division of:

- Lingwu Farm (灵武农场, لِئٍ‌وُ نْوچَانْ).

== Demographics ==
Lingwu's population was reported as 261,677 in the 2010 Chinese census. In the 2000 Chinese census, the city's population was 249,890. The city has a Hui majority population.

== Economy ==
The city has significant coal, natural gas, and petroleum reserves. Lingwu has a proven coal reserve of 27.3 billion tons.

Lingwu also has a significant agricultural sector, with rice, wheat, corn, and jujubes all being grown in the city. The city is well known for its "Lingwu long jujube" (Chinese: 灵武长枣). This fruit has proven to be one of Ningxia's most popular agricultural products, producing an income of over 10 million yuan per year.

== Notable sites ==
- Zhenhe Pagoda (Chinese: 镇河塔)
- Shuidonggou Ruins
- Portions of the Ming Great Wall

== See also ==
- Empress Erzhu (Yuan Ye's wife)
- Gao Huan
- Lingwulong, named after Lingwu
- Yuwen Tai
