= Yinchuan Plain =

Plain in Ningxia Hui Autonomous Region, China

- Chinese: 银川平原
- Country: China
- Alternative names: Ningxia Plain; Xitao Plain

Yinchuan Plain (simplified Chinese: 银川平原; traditional Chinese: 銀川平原; pinyin: Yínchuān píngyuán), also called the Yinchuan–Wuzhong Plain or Xitao Plain (西套平原) or Ningxia Plain (宁夏平原), is a plain located in the north central part of Ningxia Hui Autonomous Region, China.

Since ancient times, Yinchuan Plain has been well developed in irrigation agriculture, so it has been hailed as the "southern type of scene in the northern frontier" (塞上江南) and "the barn in the northern frontier" (塞上谷仓).

Yinchuan Plain is the largest plain in Ningxia and an important commercial grain base in Northwest China. It is a Cenozoic fault basin covered by about 2,000 metres (6,600 ft) of unconsolidated Quaternary deposits.

== Geography ==
Yinchuan Plain is located on the banks of the Yellow River in the northern part of Ningxia, China, with Shizuishan in the north, Loess Plateau in the south, the Ordos Plateau in the east, and the Helan Mountains in the west.

== Irrigation ==
Yinchuan Plain has a history of more than 2000 years of diverting water from the Yellow River for irrigation.
