= Yinchuan =

Yinchuan 银川市 Yinchwan
- Prefecture-level city
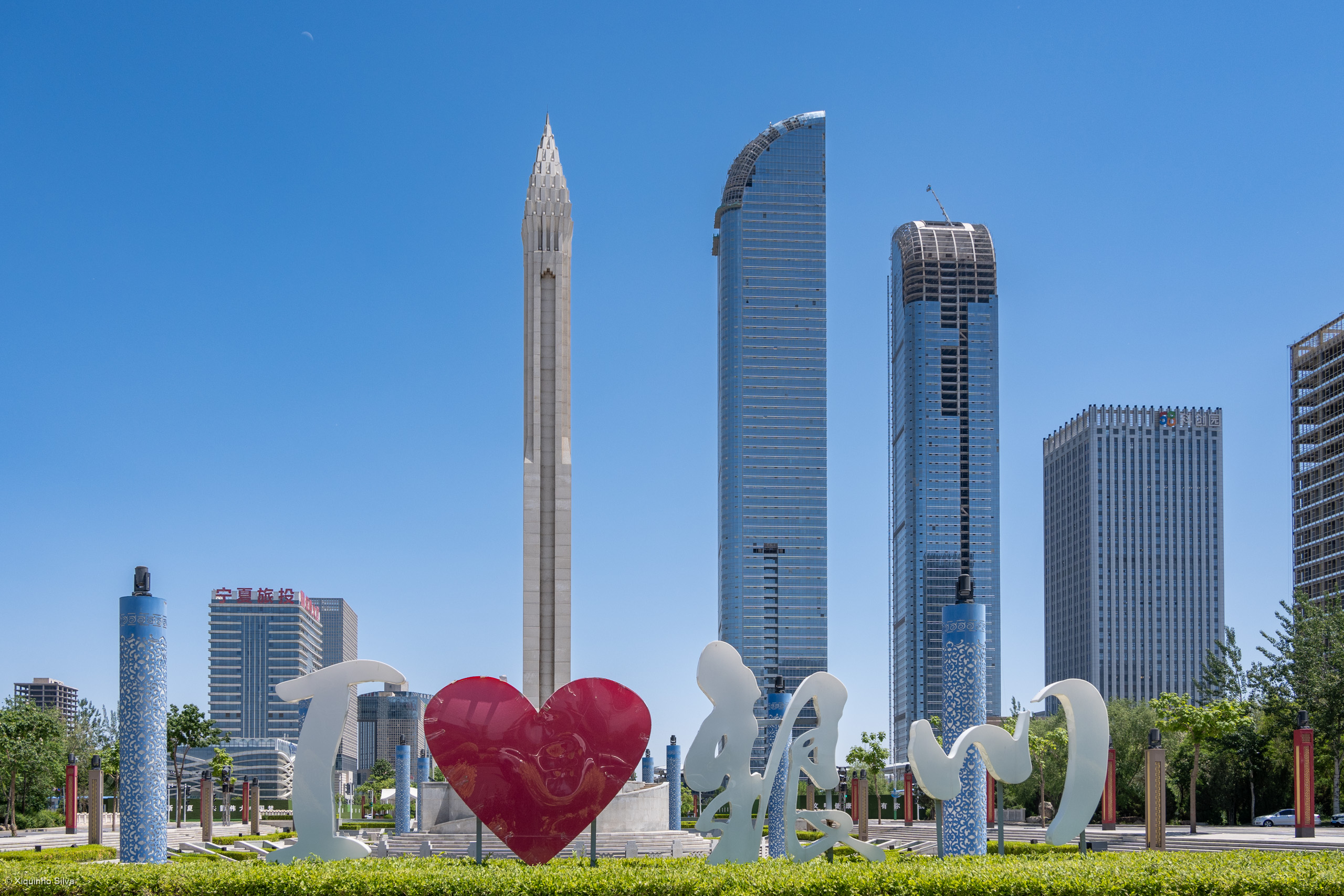
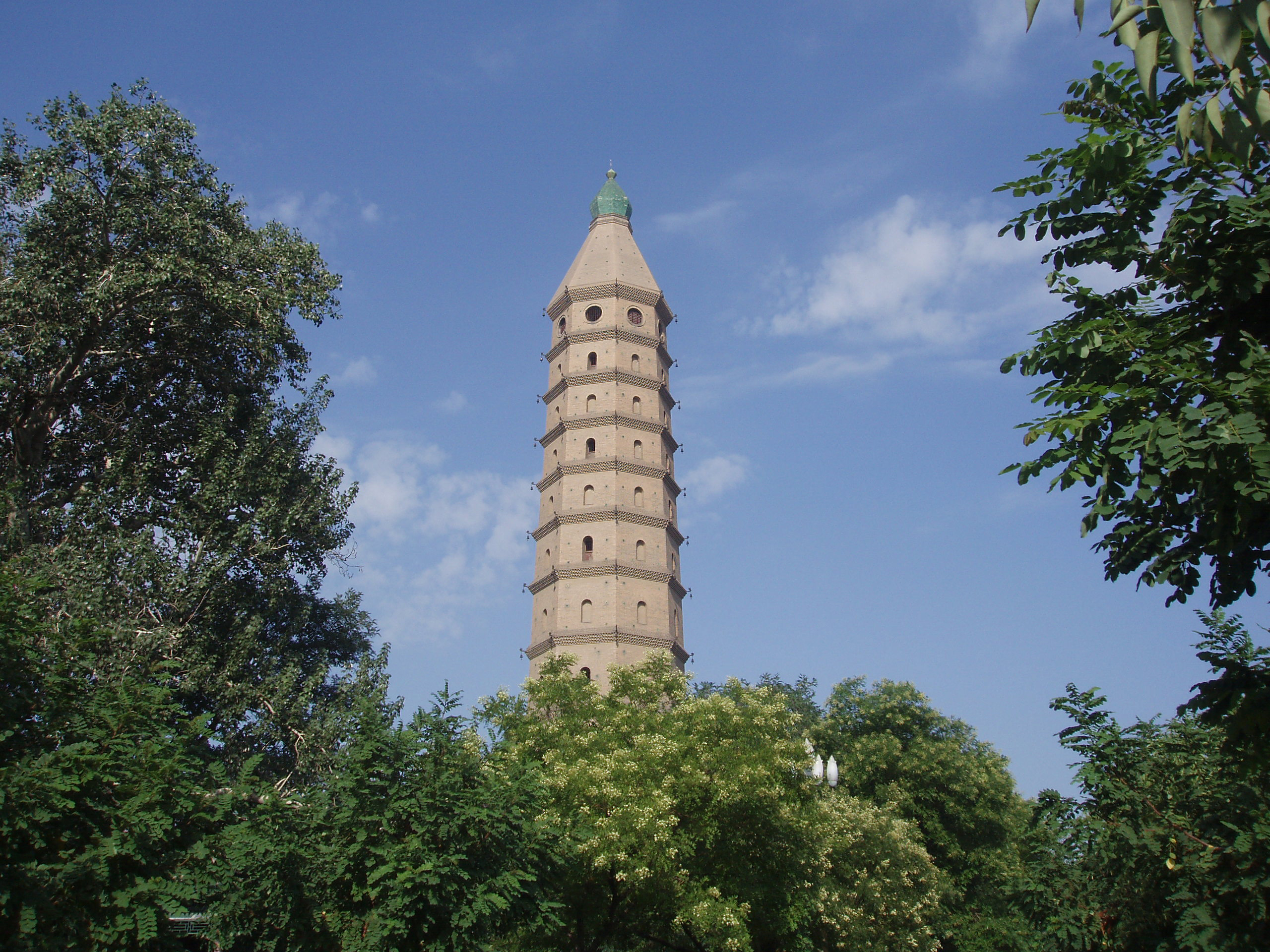
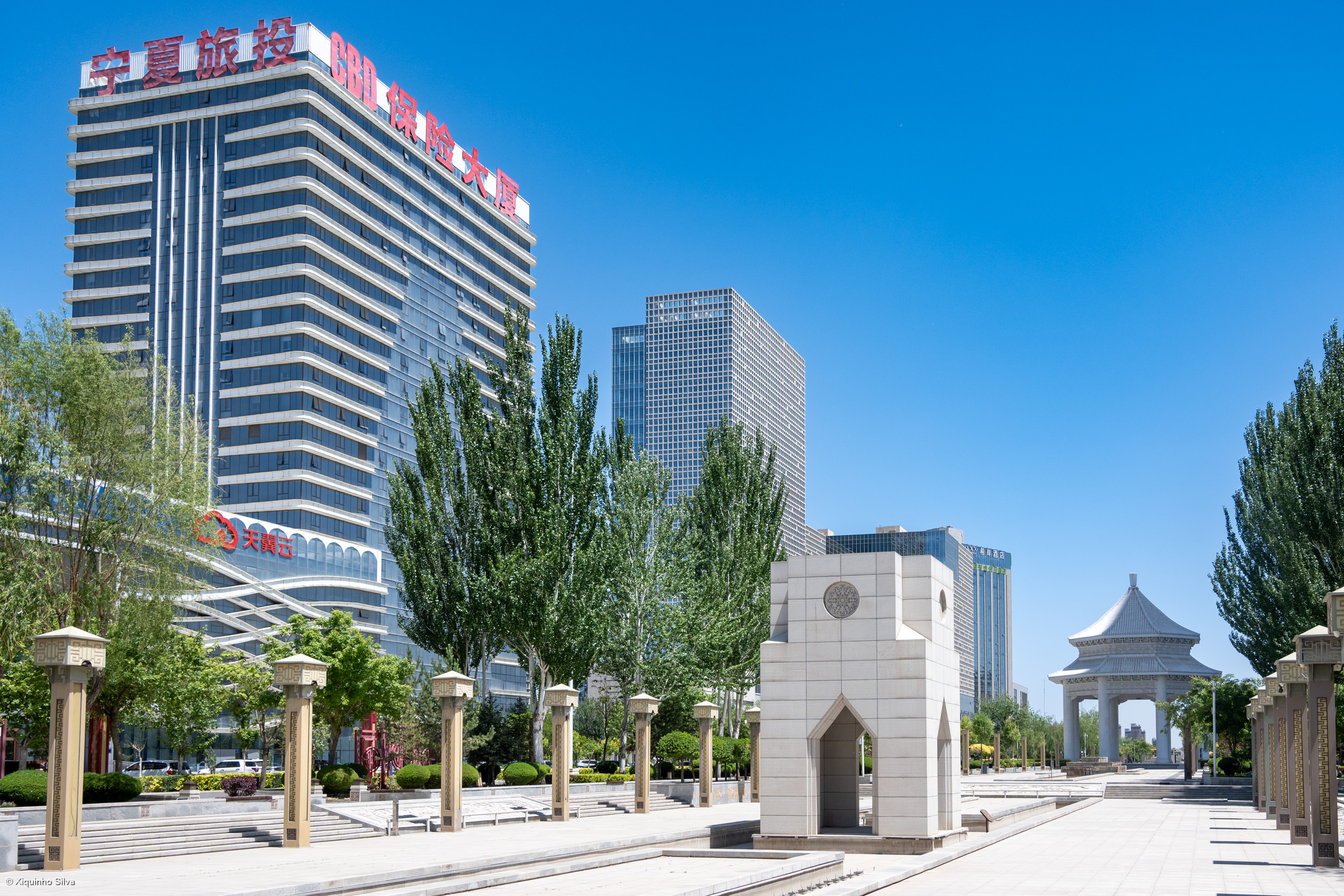
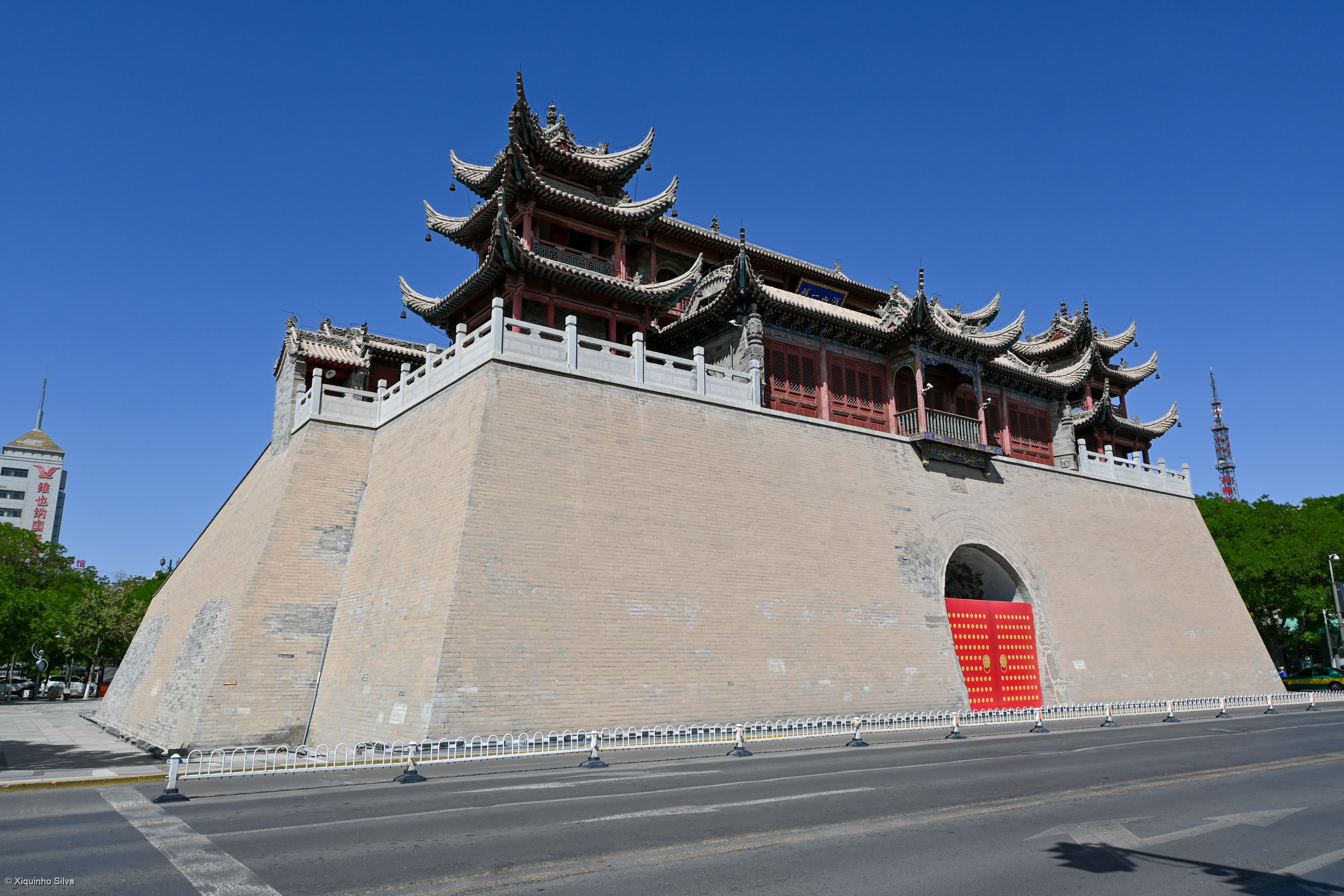
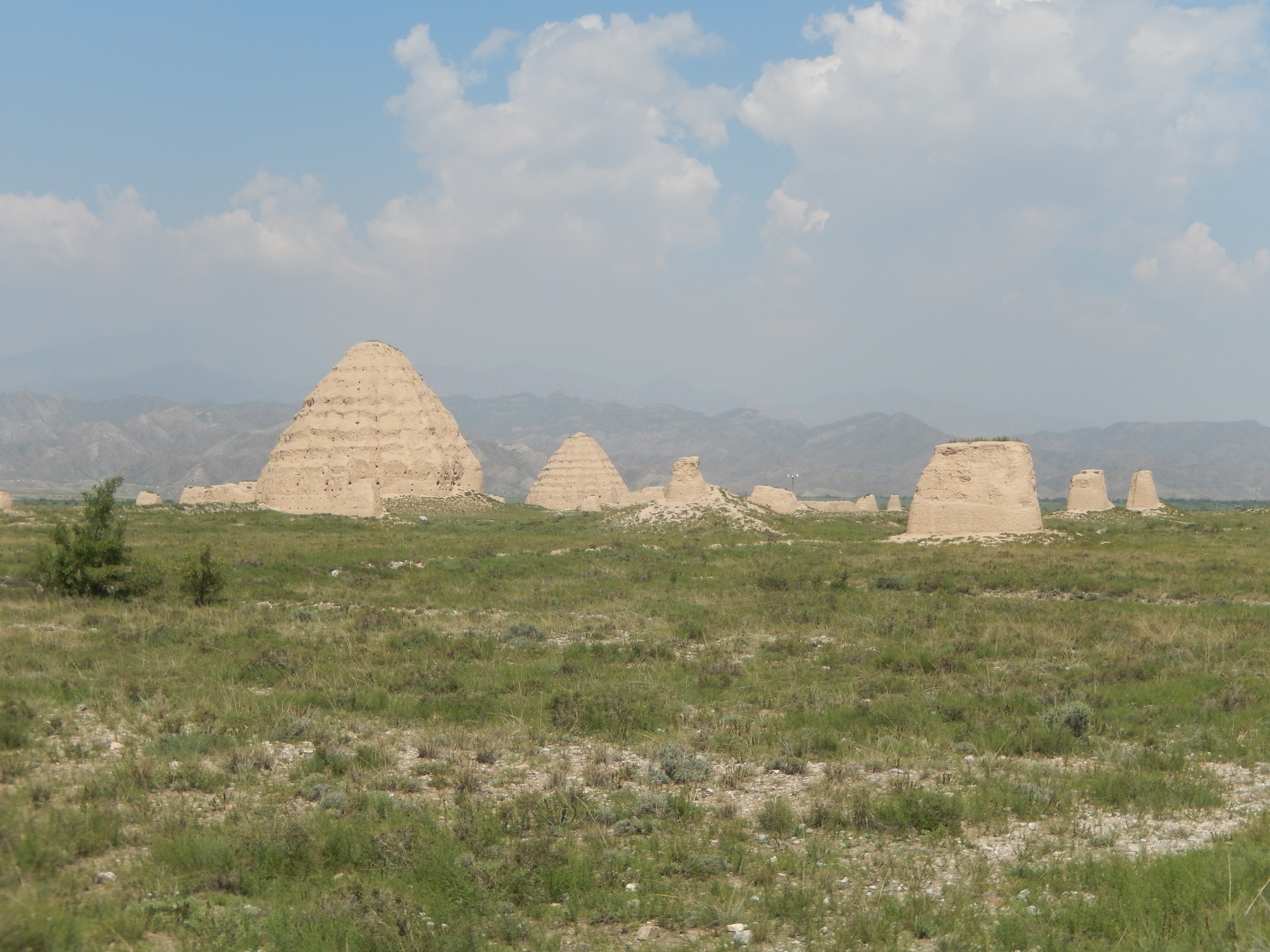
- Jinfeng District skyline Chengtian Temple pagoda Jinfeng District Yuhuang Pavilion Western Xia tombs

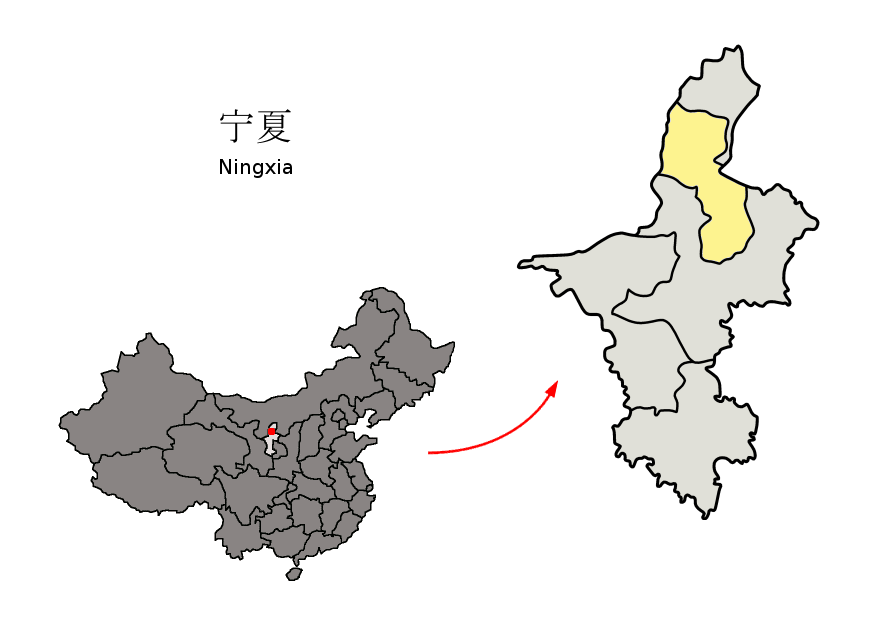
- The territory of Yinchuan prefecture-level city (yellow) within Ningxia

- Location of the city center in Ningxia Yinchuan (China)
- Coordinates (Ningxia People's Government): 38°29′06″N 106°13′30″E
- Country: China
- Autonomous region: Ningxia
- Municipal seat: Jinfeng District

Government
  - Type: Prefecture-level city
  - Body: Yinchuan Municipal People's Congress
  - CCP Secretary: Zhang Zhu
  - Congress Chairman: Li Hongru
  - Mayor: Zhao Xuhui
  - CPPCC Chairman: Ma Kai

Area
  - Prefecture-level city: 6,945.9 km^{2} (2,681.8 sq mi)
  - Urban: 3,919.9 km^{2} (1,513.5 sq mi)
  - Metro: 3,919.9 km^{2} (1,513.5 sq mi)
- Elevation: 1,100 m (3,600 ft)

Population (2020 census)
  - Prefecture-level city: 2,859,074
  - Density: 411.62/km^{2} (1,066.1/sq mi)
  - Urban: 2,564,918
  - Urban density: 654.33/km^{2} (1,694.7/sq mi)
  - Metro: 2,564,918
  - Metro density: 654.33/km^{2} (1,694.7/sq mi)

GDP (nominal) (2025)
  - Prefecture-level city: CN¥ 303.4 billion US$ 42.5 billion
  - Per capita: CN¥ 104,100; US$ 10,917
- Time zone: UTC+8 (China Standard)
- Postal code: 750000
- Area code: 0951
- ISO 3166 code: CN-NX-01
- License plate prefixes: 宁A
- Website: www.yinchuan.gov.cn (Chinese)

Yinchuan
- "Yínchuān" in Simplified (top) and Traditional (bottom) Chinese characters
- Simplified Chinese: 银川
- Traditional Chinese: 銀川
- Hanyu Pinyin: Yínchuān
- Literal meaning: "Silver River"
Transcriptions
Standard Mandarin
- Hanyu Pinyin: Yínchuān
- Bopomofo: ㄧㄣˊ ㄔㄨㄢ
- Gwoyeu Romatzyh: Ynchuan
- Wade–Giles: Yin^{2}-chʻuan^{1}
- IPA: [ǐn.ʈʂʰwán]
Wu
- Romanization: Nyin^{平}-tshoe^{平}
Yue: Cantonese
- Yale Romanization: Ngàhnchyūn
- Jyutping: Ngan4cyun1
- IPA: [ŋɐn˩.tsʰyn˥]
Southern Min
- Hokkien POJ: Gîn-chhoan
- Tâi-lô: Gîn-tshoan

Yinchuan (Chinese: 银川; pinyin: Yínchuān; lit. 'Silver River') is a prefecture‑level city and the capital of the Ningxia Hui Autonomous Region in northwest China. It served as the imperial capital of the Tangut‑led Western Xia (1038–1227).

Yinchuan hosts the biennial China–Arab States Expo. As of the 2020 Chinese census, Yinchuan’s administrative area had 2,859,074 inhabitants; the built‑up area had 2,564,918 residents, comprising the three urban districts and the urbanized parts of Helan and Yongning counties. At the end of 2024, the resident population of the city was 2,914,700, an increase of 66,600 over the end of the previous year. Among them, the urban population is 2,429,400.

== History ==
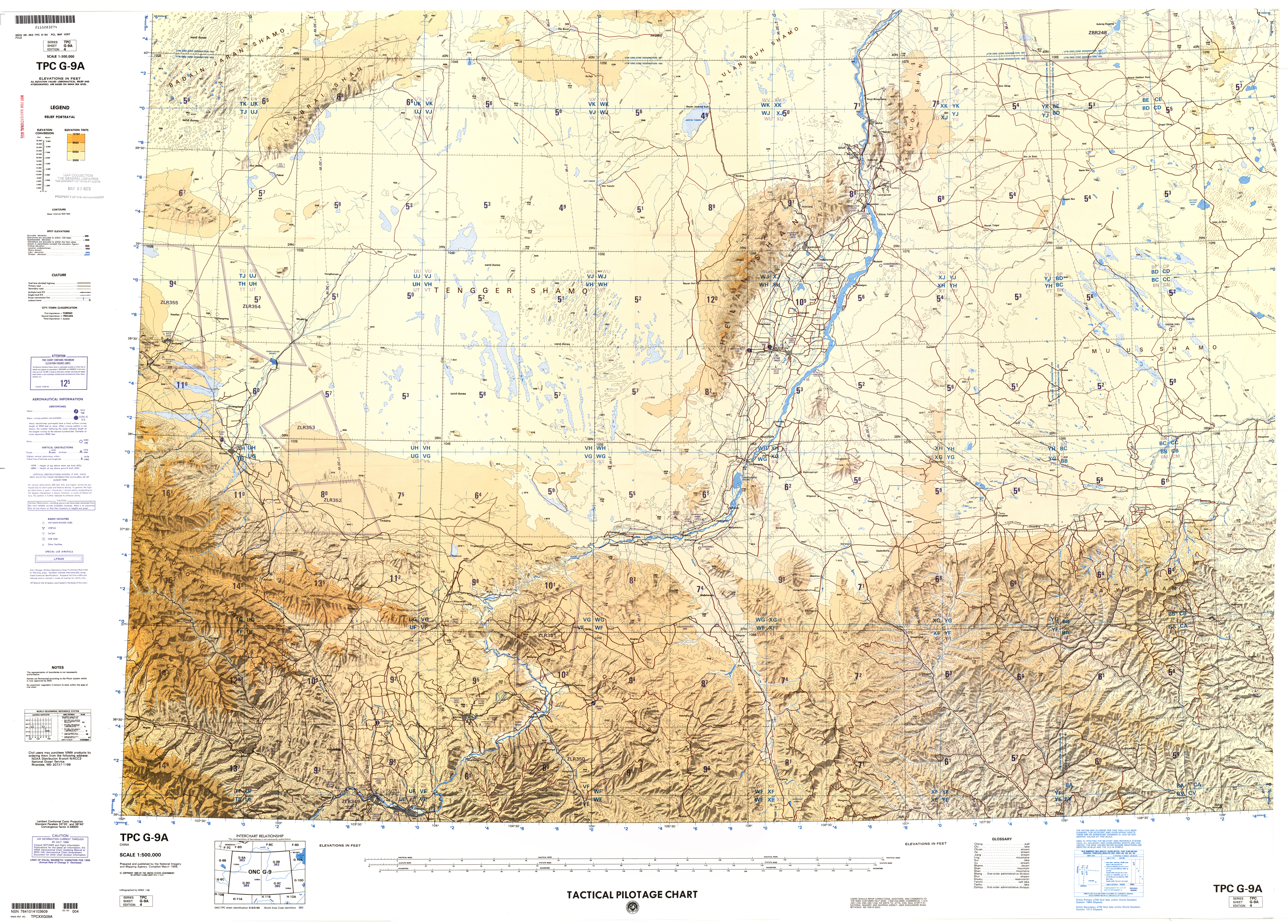
Map including Yinchuan

The area that is now Yinchuan was home to Shuidonggou, China's earliest paleolithic site. It dates from over 30,000 years ago. Later in Chinese prehistory, rock art was created in the Helan mountains adjacent to modern-day Yinchuan.

Yinchuan was originally a county under the name of Fuping in the 1st century BCE; its name was changed to Huaiyuan in the 6th century CE.

=== Western Xia and Mongol Conquest ===
After the fall of the Tang dynasty in 907, Yinchuan came under the control of the Tanguts. In 1038, the Tangut leader Yuanhao declared himself emperor of the Great Xia and made Yinchuan his capital, at that time known as "Xingqing" (simplified Chinese: 兴庆; traditional Chinese: 興慶; pinyin: Xīngqìng). This provoked much of the native Han population to emigrate. Several of Yinchuan's important cultural sites were built under the Western Xia, such as the Pagoda of Chengtian and the Western Xia mausoleums.

In the autumn of 1209, the Mongols invaded Western Xia. They laid siege to Yinchuan, which by this point was known as "Zhongxing". The garrison of 150,000 managed to hold out against the Mongols, although Western Xia submitted to Mongol suzerainty regardless. After Xia attempted to reassert its independence, in 1227 the Mongols returned and slaughtered the city's entire population. Genghis Khan died during the siege under debated circumstances. The Mongols knew the city as "Iryai".

=== Ming and Qing dynasties ===
Under the Ming (1368–1644) and Qing (1644–1911) dynasties, it was a prefecture of Ningxia. During the Dungan revolt, Dungan forces massacred 100,000 people in Yinchuan.

In 1739, the city was heavily affected by the Yinchuan–Pingluo earthquake. A maximum intensity of XII was determined on the Chinese seismic intensity scale, and XI on the Mercalli intensity scale. The earthquake collapsed most houses, temples, offices, and a city wall 10 m (33 ft) tall and 6 m (20 ft) wide. Ground fissures up to a meter wide and 100 m (330 ft) long, and great subsidence was recorded in historical records. Over 15,300 people killed and the city was completely leveled. Blazing fires burned all the way through the night as many canals were destroyed, shutting off the flow of water. The ground opened for more than 100 m (330 ft), where sand and black water erupted. Aftershocks persisted for more than two years, with the largest being a 5.5 on 13 February that same year.

=== 20th century ===
In 1928, when the province of Ningxia was formed from part of Gansu, Yinchuan became the capital city. In 1954, when Ningxia province was abolished, the city was put in Gansu province; but, with the establishment of the Ningxia Hui autonomous region in 1958, Yinchuan once again became the capital.

Traditionally, Yinchuan was an administrative and commercial center. In the 1950s, the city had many commercial enterprises, and there were some handicrafts, but no modern industry. The city has since grown considerably. Extensive coal deposits discovered on the eastern bank of the Yellow River, near Shizuishan, 100 km (62 mi) to the north, have made Shizuishan a coal-mining center.

Yinchuan, however, remains largely non-industrial. The immediate plains area, intensively irrigated by a system developed as long ago as the Han (206 BC–AD 220) and Tang (618–907) dynasties, is extremely productive. Yinchuan is the chief agricultural market and distribution center for this area and also deals in animal products from the herds tended by nomads in the surrounding grasslands. It is a market for grain and has flour mills, as well as rice-hulling and oil-extraction plants. The wool produced in the surrounding plains supplies a woolen-textile mill.

During the nationwide 1989 Protests that followed the death of Hu Yaobang, Yinchuan was the site of student demonstrations responding to the April 26 Editorial. On 28 May, numbers dropped drastically when only 3,000 students took to the streets. A similar number of people would march again, this time with wreaths and banners, when they heard the news about the June 4 crackdown in Beijing.

On 23 July 1993, China Northwest Airlines Flight 2119, en route from Yinchuan Xihuayuan Airport to Beijing Capital International Airport, crashed into a lake after it was unable to get airborne while attempting to take off at Yinchuan Airport, killing 54 passengers and 1 crew member on board.

=== 21st century ===
On 21 June 2023, a gas explosion inside a barbecue restaurant in Yinchuan killed at least 31 people and injured 7 others.

== Geography ==
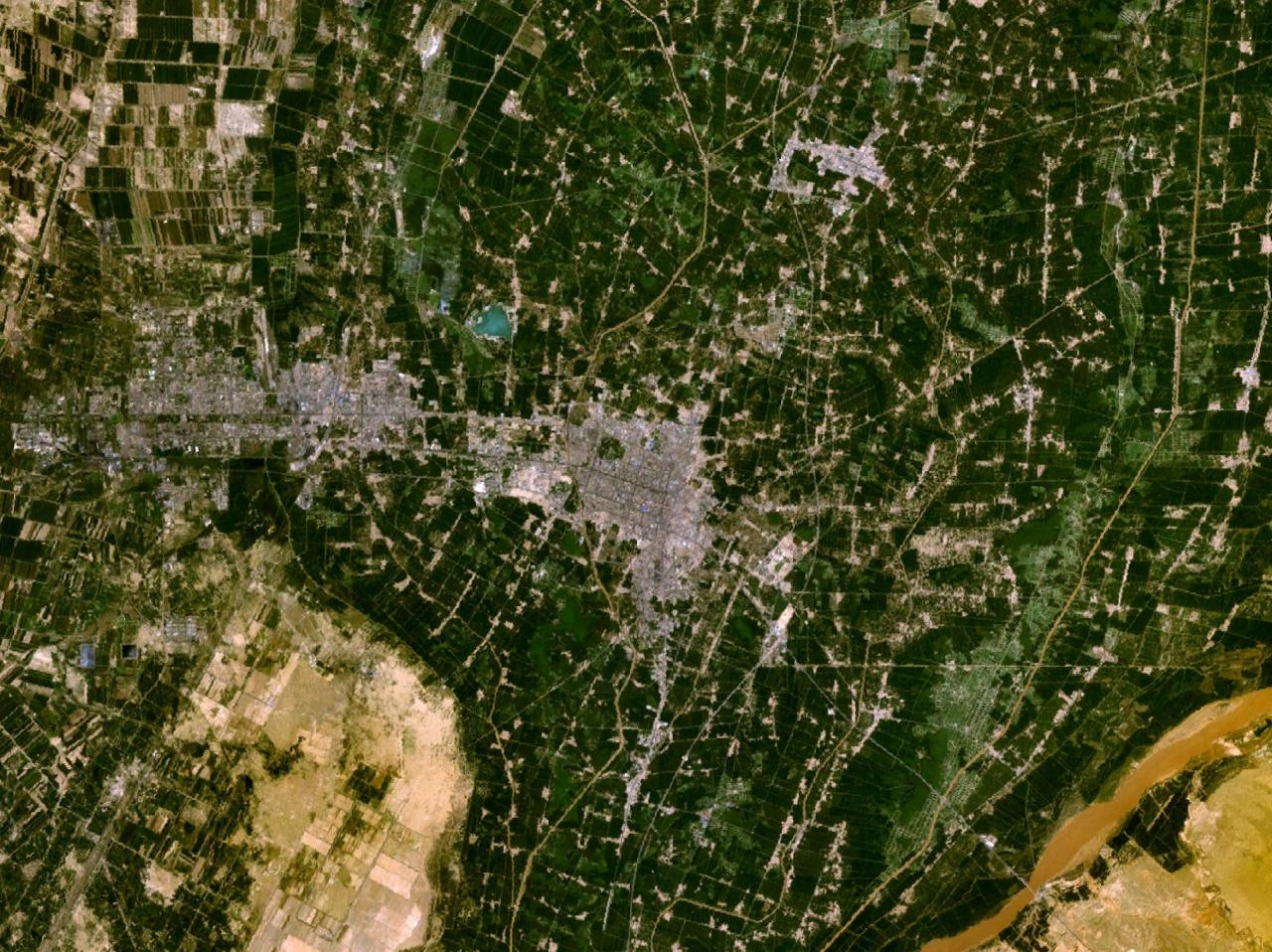
Satellite image of Yinchuan in 2005

Yinchuan lies in the middle of the Yinchuan Plain. It is sheltered from the deserts of Mongolia by the high ranges of the Helan Mountains to its west. The Yellow River runs through Yinchuan from southwest to northeast. The average elevation of Yinchuan is 1,100 meters (about 3,608 feet). The urban center of Yinchuan lies about halfway between the Yellow River and the edge of Helan Mountains.

=== Climate ===
Yinchuan has a cold desert climate (Köppen BWk) with an annual rainfall of 194 mm (7.64 in). Yinchuan has distinct seasons, with dry, cold winters, late springs and short hot summers. The monthly 24-hour average temperature ranges from −6.8 °C (19.8 °F) in January to 24.4 °C (75.9 °F) in July, with the annual mean at 10.1 °C (50.2 °F). Diurnal temperature variation tends to be large due to the aridity, which also partly contributes to the sunny climate; with monthly percent possible sunshine ranging from 58 percent in January to 67 percent in November, the city receives 2,761 hours of bright sunshine annually. There are 158 frost-free days.

Climate data for Yinchuan, elevation 1,112 m (3,648 ft), (1991–2020 normals, extremes 1951–present)
Month	Jan	Feb	Mar	Apr	May	Jun	Jul	Aug	Sep	Oct	Nov	Dec	Year
Record high °C (°F)	16.7 (62.1)	20.6 (69.1)	27.9 (82.2)	35.1 (95.2)	36.5 (97.7)	37.2 (99.0)	39.3 (102.7)	37.8 (100.0)	35.7 (96.3)	29.9 (85.8)	24.6 (76.3)	16.5 (61.7)	39.3 (102.7)
Mean daily maximum °C (°F)	−0.2 (31.6)	5.1 (41.2)	12.3 (54.1)	20.1 (68.2)	25.0 (77.0)	29.0 (84.2)	30.6 (87.1)	28.6 (83.5)	23.8 (74.8)	17.4 (63.3)	8.6 (47.5)	1.1 (34.0)	16.8 (62.2)
Daily mean °C (°F)	−6.8 (19.8)	−2.1 (28.2)	5.2 (41.4)	12.8 (55.0)	18.2 (64.8)	22.7 (72.9)	24.4 (75.9)	22.5 (72.5)	17.1 (62.8)	10.0 (50.0)	2.2 (36.0)	−4.9 (23.2)	10.1 (50.2)
Mean daily minimum °C (°F)	−12.1 (10.2)	−8.0 (17.6)	−0.9 (30.4)	5.9 (42.6)	11.3 (52.3)	16.2 (61.2)	18.6 (65.5)	17.0 (62.6)	11.6 (52.9)	4.2 (39.6)	−2.5 (27.5)	−9.5 (14.9)	4.3 (39.8)
Record low °C (°F)	−30.6 (−23.1)	−25.4 (−13.7)	−19.3 (−2.7)	−11.7 (10.9)	−3.8 (25.2)	3.9 (39.0)	11.1 (52.0)	6.8 (44.2)	−3.3 (26.1)	−9.0 (15.8)	−15.8 (3.6)	−29.3 (−20.7)	−30.6 (−23.1)
Average precipitation mm (inches)	1.3 (0.05)	2.0 (0.08)	5.3 (0.21)	9.2 (0.36)	21.0 (0.83)	27.9 (1.10)	41.9 (1.65)	41.3 (1.63)	27.5 (1.08)	11.1 (0.44)	4.3 (0.17)	1.0 (0.04)	193.8 (7.64)
Average precipitation days (≥ 0.1 mm)	1.8	1.2	2.0	2.9	4.4	5.5	7.2	7.7	6.6	3.4	1.6	1.0	45.3
Average snowy days	2.9	2.0	1.3	0.4	0	0	0	0	0	0.4	1.6	1.5	10.1
Average relative humidity (%)	54	45	40	37	42	49	58	63	64	58	59	56	52
Mean monthly sunshine hours	177.9	190.5	228.6	251.3	282.8	280.6	276.8	252.6	220.2	228.0	193.0	178.8	2,761.1
Percentage possible sunshine	58	62	61	63	64	63	62	61	60	67	65	61	62
Source 1: China Meteorological Administration
Source 2: Pogodaiklimat.ru (extremes)

== Administrative divisions ==
Map
Name	Simplified Chinese	Hanyu Pinyin	Xiao'erjing	Population (2019)	Area (km^{2})	Density (/km^{2})
City proper
Xingqing District	兴庆区	Xīngqìng Qū	ثٍْ‌ٿٍْ ٿِيُوِ	755,441	768	984
Jinfeng District	金凤区	Jīnfèng Qū	ڭٍ‌فٍْ ٿِيُوِ	369,296	290	1,273
Xixia District	西夏区	Xīxià Qū	ثِ‌ثِيَا ٿِيُوِ	362,842	987	368
Satellite cities
Lingwu City	灵武市	Língwǔ Shì	لِئٍ‌وُ شِ	296,122	4,639	64
Rural
Yongning County	永宁县	Yǒngníng Xiàn	يٌ‌نِئٍ ثِيًا	245,570	1,295	190
Helan County	贺兰县	Hèlán Xiàn	حَ‌لًا ثِيًا	263,832	1,600	165

== Demographics ==
=== Ethnic groups ===
As of 2019, 72.43% of the city's population is Han Chinese, 25.79% is Hui, and 1.78% are other ethnic minorities. Of the city's six county-level divisions, all have a super-majority of Han Chinese people, except the county-level city of Lingwu, which is majority Hui.

=== Urbanization ===
Of the city's population, 79.05% live in urban areas as of 2019. This proportion is highest in Xixia District, where 91.28% of the population lives in urban areas, and is lowest in Lingwu, where 58.22% of the population lives in urban areas.

== Economy ==
As of 2025, Yinchuan had a GDP of CN¥303.353 billion (US$42.469 billion) and a GDP per capita of CN¥104,100 (US$10,917). In 2010, Yinchuan was designated as the site for the China-Arab States Cooperation Forum. At the national level, Yinchuan hosts the China-Arab States Expo, to function as a commercial link between China and Arab States. Yinchuan has an aircraft tire plant owned by Singapore-based Giti Tire.

Yinchuan classifies itself as a smart city, where modern technology is employed such as facial recognition for public transport payments, connected trash bins and digital citizen service centres.

From 12 to 16 October 2026, the 47th World Congress on Vines and Wine was held in Yinchuan, together with the 24th General Assembly of the International Organisation of Vine and Wine (OIV), at the invitation of the Government of the People’s Republic of China.

== Transportation ==
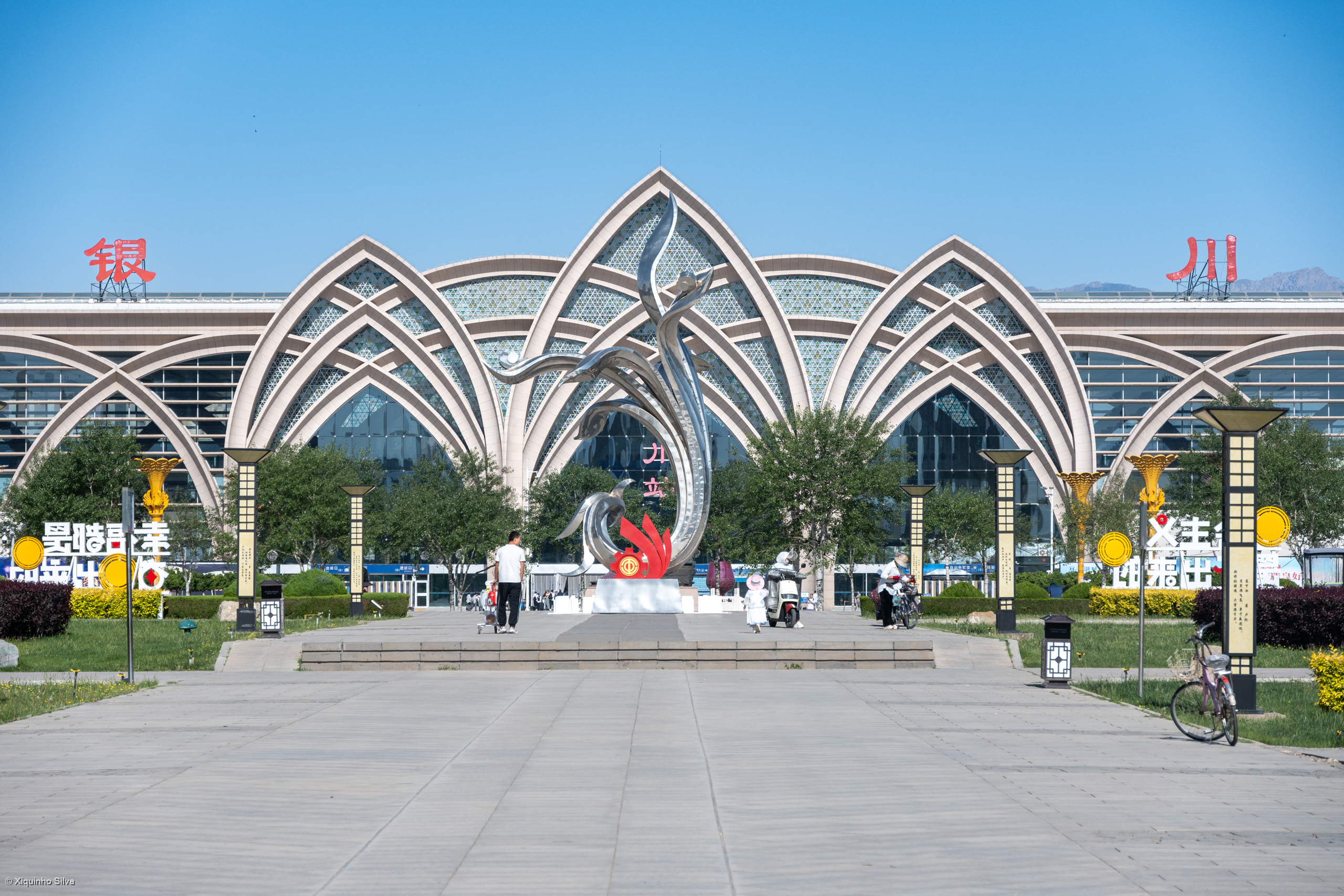
Yinchuan railway station

Until the 1950s, the Yellow River, which is navigable downstream as far as Baotou in the Inner Mongolian autonomous region and upstream to Zhongwei and Zhongning, was the chief communication link. Yinchuan still has a river port at Hengcheng, about 15 km (9.3 mi) to the east.

=== Rail transport ===
Since 1958, the city has been served by Yinchuan railway station on the Baotou–Lanzhou railway, integrating it into the Chinese railway network. The Taiyuan–Zhongwei–Yinchuan railway opened in 2011. Since the opening of the Yinchuan–Zhongwei high-speed railway in 2019, Yinchuan is also served by high-speed train services.

Yinchuan is the first Chinese city to implement a monorail beyond demonstrational use, transporting visitors around the Yinchuan International Flower Expo park. The BYD Skytrain based system entered operation in September 2017.

=== Road transport ===
Highways link the city to Baotou along the river, to Lanzhou in Gansu province to the southwest, to Wuwei in Gansu to the west, and to Xi'an in Shaanxi province to the southeast.

- China National Highway 110, 109, 211 and 244
- G69 Yinchuan–Baise Expressway
- G85 Yinchuan–Kunming Expressway
- G1816 Wuhai–Maqên Expressway
- G2004 Yinchuan Ring Expressway

In Q1 2018, Yinchuan ranked first in traffic congestion severity in China. According to research by AutoNavi, and the Planning and Research Institute of the Ministry of Transport, this was caused by numerous construction works and the poor structure of the road network, rather than pure traffic volume. After reorganization of the road network and bottleneck intersections, congestion has reduced.

=== Air transport ===
It is served by Yinchuan Hedong International Airport. It is 25 km (16 mi) from Yinchuan and has flights to Beijing, Chengdu, Dunhuang, Guangzhou, Shanghai, Xian, and Zhengzhou.

== Culture ==
Although most residents are Han Chinese, Yinchuan is a center for the Muslim Hui people, who constitute slightly over a quarter of the population. Hui Muslims play a vital role as being middlemen in trade between the Middle East and China, and the China-Middle East trade has become increasingly important to the country. Consequently, the national government has started constructing a $3.7 billion Islamic theme park called "World Muslim City" in Yinchuan. Unlike Uyghurs, who faces far more restrictions in religious freedoms, Hui Muslims generally do not seek independence from China and have a cultural affinity to the Han, and are far more assimilated into mainstream Chinese life.

A number of cultural festivals are celebrated in Yinchuan. These include an Internet Film Festival, a Car and Motorcycle Tourism Festival, and an International Poetry Festival. Until 2000, Yinchuan was also the traditional host of an August festival celebrating the harvesting of Goji berries (a major product of Ningxia).

== Tourism ==
The city's attractions include the Sand-lake, the Western Xia tombs, and the China Western film Studios.

Sand Lake is a lake in a desert 35 miles north of Yinchuan with birds, reeds, lotus and fish.

The Western Xia Imperial Tombs are 15.5 miles west of Yinchuan on east side of Mt. Helan. Since June 1972, nine imperial tombs and 253 lesser tombs have been unearthed, which are as grand as Ming Tombs in Beijing. With a total area of more than 19.3 square miles, it is unique among royal burials.

China West Film Studio, which has been famed as "One Superb in China, and Treasure of Ningxia Province", is at the eastern foot of the magnificent Helanshan Mountain, 25 kilometers from the railway station of Yinchuan City, and 48 kilometers from Hedong Airport. It produced The Herdsman, Red Sorghum, Lover's Grief over the Yellow River, New Dragon Gate Inn, Ashes of Time, A Chinese Odyssey, the television series Qiao's Grand Courtyard, and nearly one hundred other films. In 2018, John Cena lived for five months in Yinchuan while working on a film, Hidden Strike, with Jackie Chan.

There are two pagodas in Yinchuan that are part of the "Eight Famous Scenery of Ningxia": one is the Haibao Pagoda in the northern suburb and the other is the Chengtiansi Pagoda in the west.

Parts of the Great Wall are near the city.

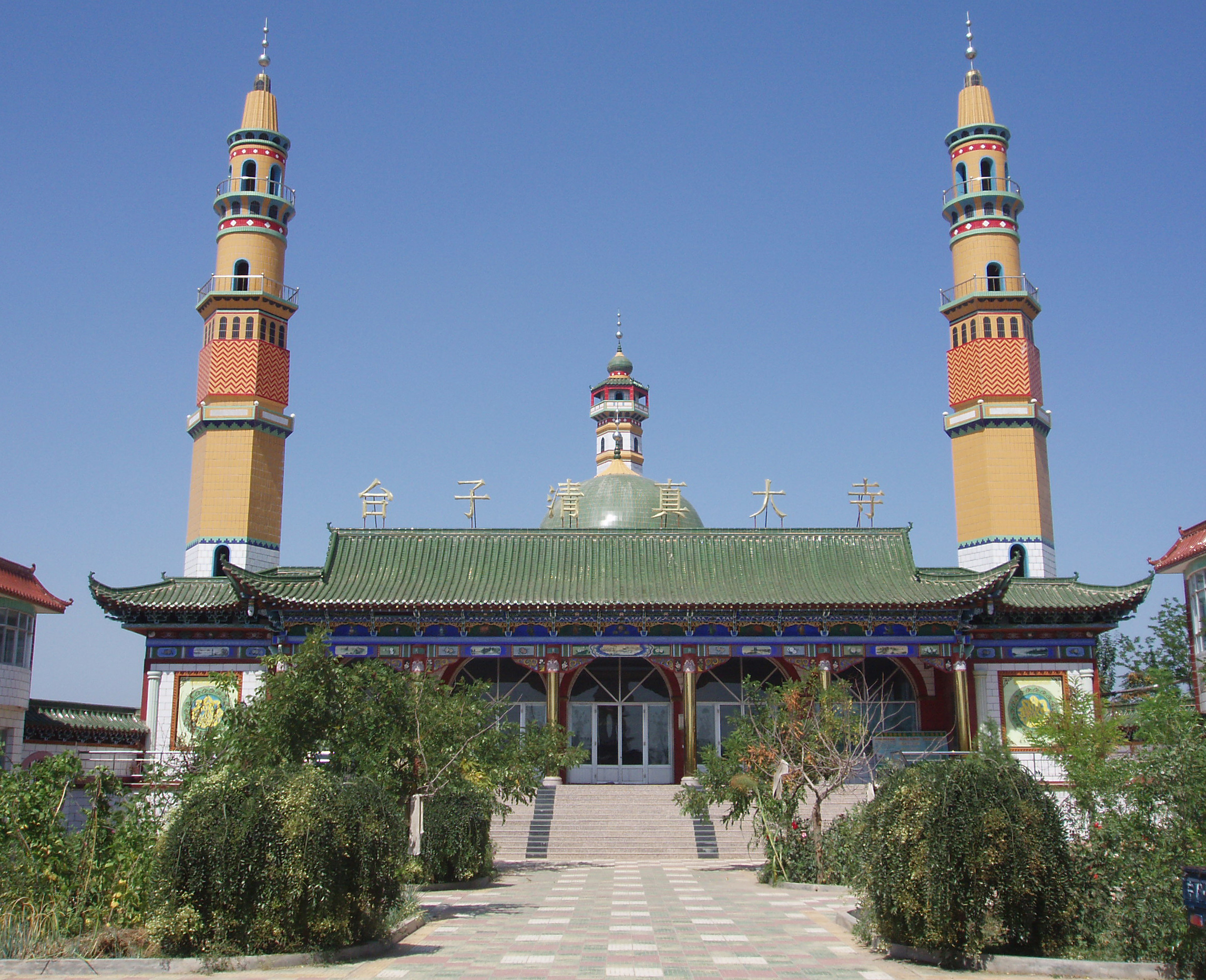
Taizi Great Mosque

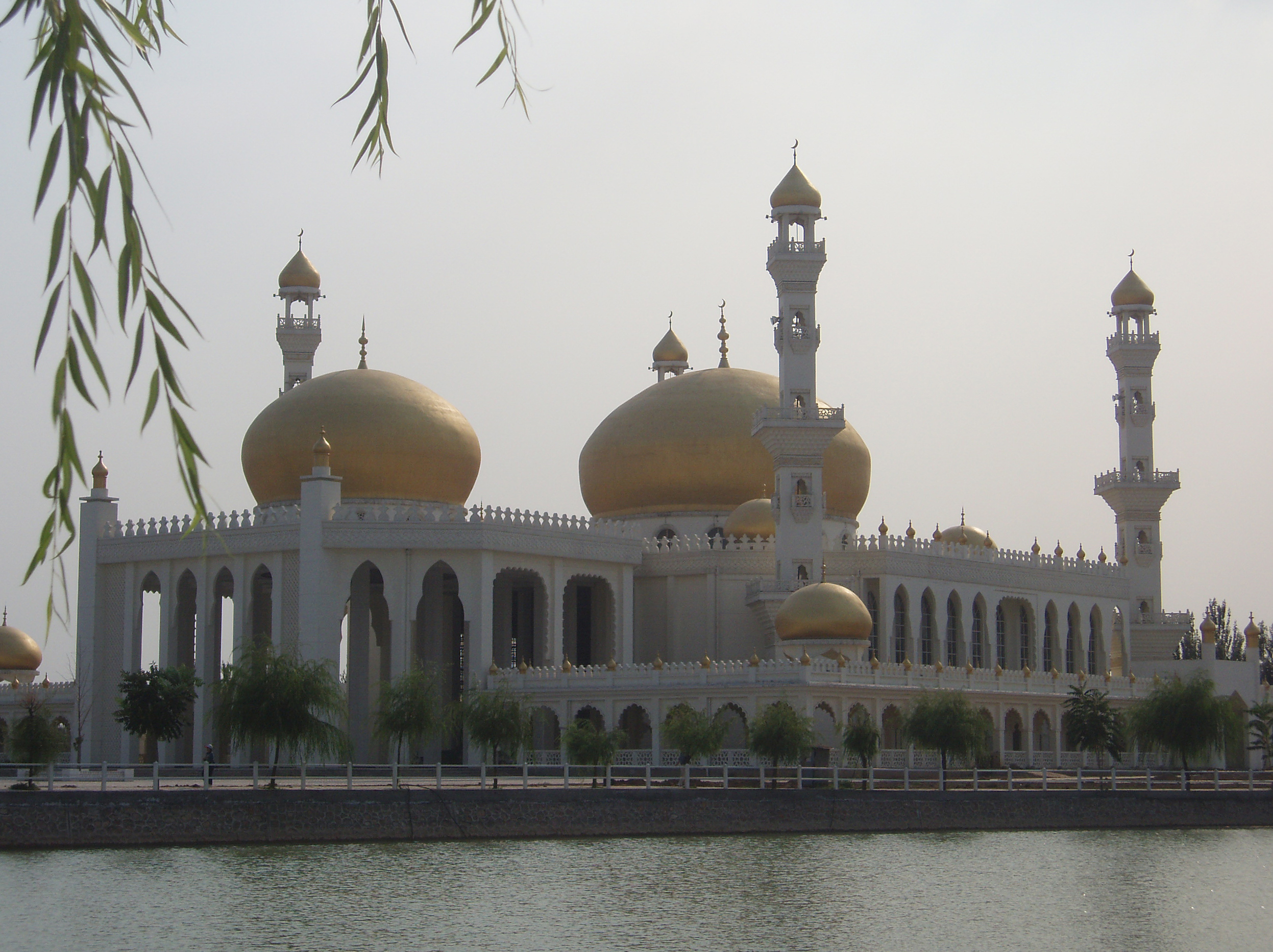
A mosque in Yinchuan

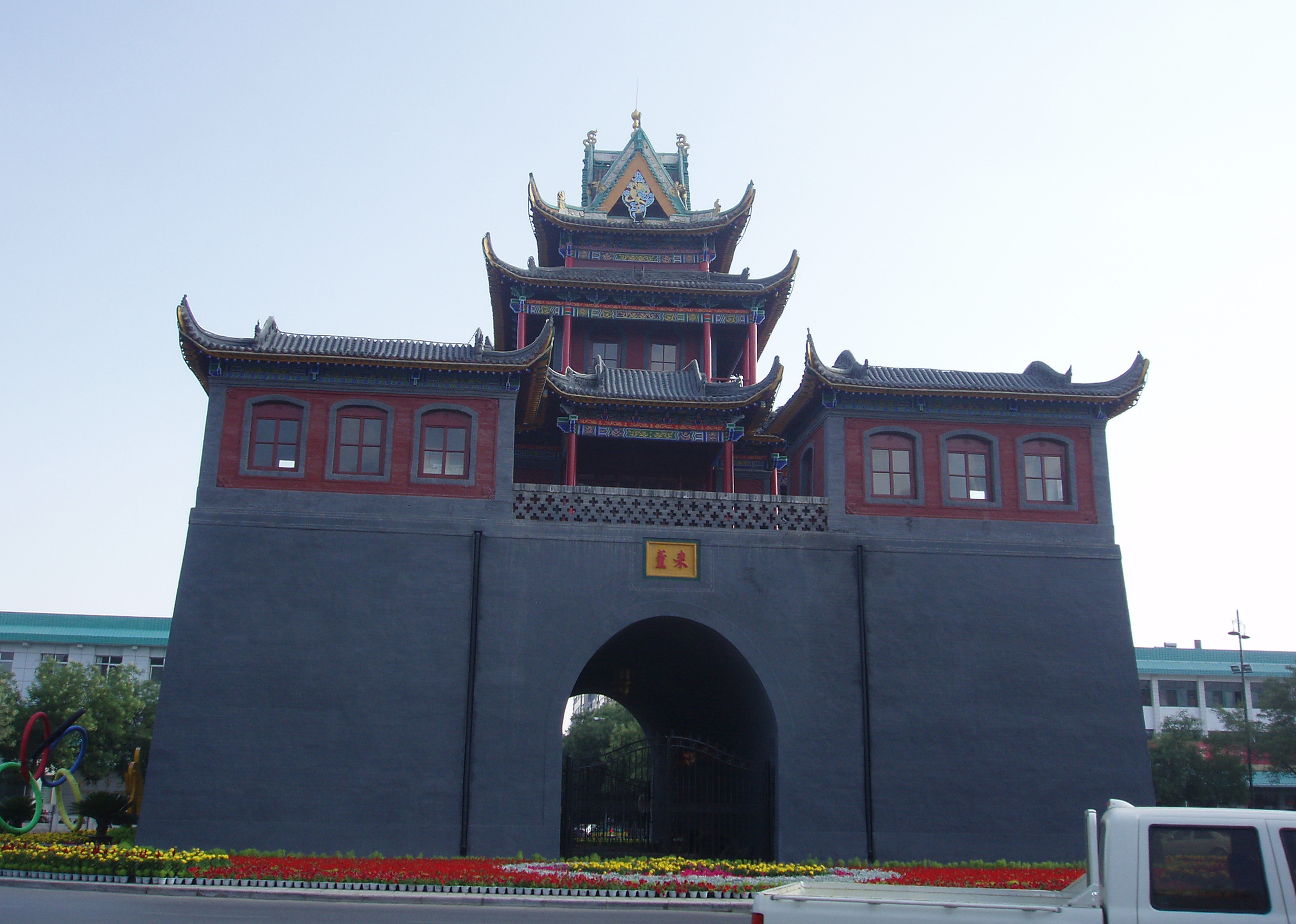
Yinchuan Drum Tower

== Colleges and universities ==
Yinchuan is home to Ningxia University and Ningxia Medical University.

== See also ==
- List of twin towns and sister cities in China
- Twin pagodas of Baisikou
- Yinchuan Museum of Contemporary Art
