= CAAC (airline) =

Airline of China (1952–1991)

CAAC 中国民航

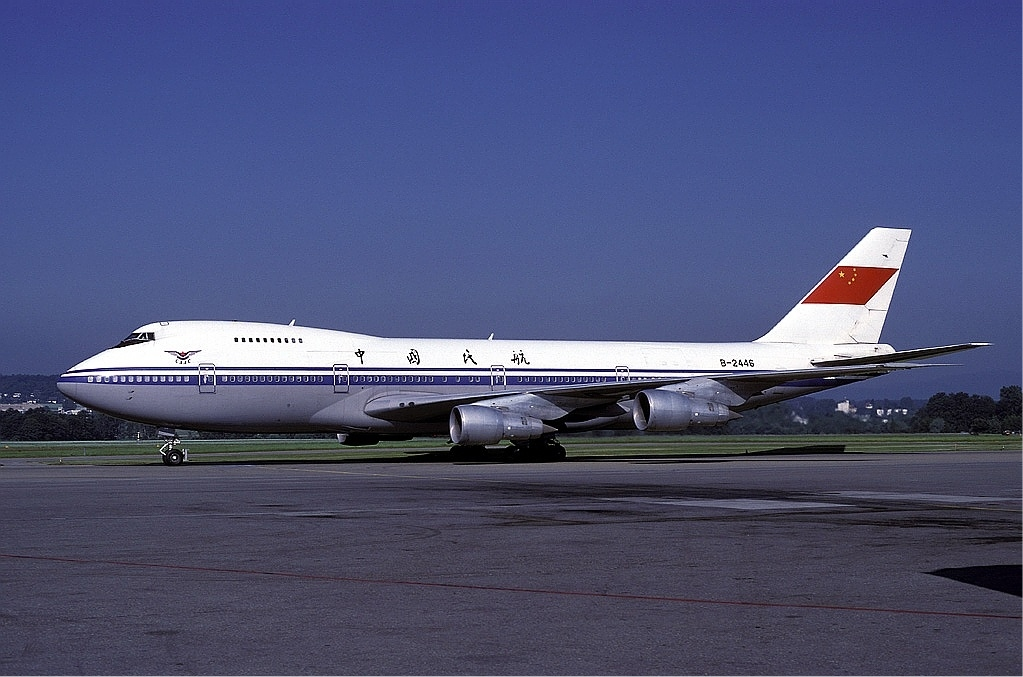
- CAAC Boeing 747-200B(M) at Zurich Airport in 1986
IATA	ICAO	Call sign
CA	CCA	CAAC
- Founded: 17 July 1952 (as the People's Aviation Company of China)
- Commenced operations: 9 June 1953 (as CAAC)
- Ceased operations: 30 January 1987 (split into six airlines)
- Hubs: Beijing–Capital; Chengdu–Shuangliu; Guangzhou–Baiyun; Shanghai–Hongqiao; Shenyang–Dongta; Xi'an–Xiguan
- Fleet size: 273
- Destinations: 85 cities in 25 countries (1987)
- Parent company: State Council of China
- Headquarters: Beijing, China
- Key people: Director of the General Office

CAAC (airline)
- Simplified Chinese: 中国民航
- Traditional Chinese: 中國民航
Transcriptions
Standard Mandarin
- Hanyu Pinyin: Zhōngguó mínháng
Yue: Cantonese
- Jyutping: zung^{1}gwok^{3}man^{4}hong^{4}

CAAC (Chinese: 中国民航; pinyin: Zhōngguó Mínháng; lit. 'China Civil Aviation'), formerly the People's Aviation Company of China (中国人民航空公司), was the airline owned by the Civil Aviation Administration of China (which it inherited its common English name and acronym from). It enjoyed the monopoly status in the country from 1953 to 1987, before Deng Xiaoping's reform of separation of government and enterprise.

The airline was founded on 17 July 1952, and merged into the CAAC on 9 June 1953. From 1987 until 1991, the monopoly was broken up and CAAC was split into six regional airlines, which nowadays became China's Big Three airlines: Air China (Beijing-based), China Southern Airlines (Guangzhou-based), and China Eastern Airlines (Shanghai-based).

== Separation ==
In 1987, the State Council decided to split CAAC airline into multiple airlines in order to encourage operating efficiency and profitability. Between 1987 and 1991, six airlines were formed, each named after the geographic region of their main operating areas:

- Air China, the flag carrier, based in Beijing (established 1988), inherited the IATA and ICAO airline code of CAAC
- China Southwest Airlines, based in Chengdu (established 1987; merged into Air China in 2002)
- China Eastern Airlines, based in Shanghai (established 1988)
- China Northwest Airlines, based in Xi'an (established 1989; merged into China Eastern Airlines in 2002)
- China Southern Airlines, based in Guangzhou (established 1988)
- China Northern Airlines, based in Shenyang (established 1990; merged into China Southern Airlines in 2004)

CAAC used the IATA code CA on international flights only; domestic flights were not prefixed with the airline code.

CAAC's aircraft livery featured the Chinese national flag on the vertical stabilizer, with blue stripe cheatline and Chinese version of CAAC logo (designed by Lu Shifang in 1965, with the calligraphy of Premier Zhou Enlai) on a white fuselage. Most of the livery designs, especially the blue stripe cheatline, were also used by Air China.

== Destinations ==
In 1962, CAAC began operating international services, initially to other countries in the communist bloc, such as the Soviet Union, Mongolia, North Korea, Laos, Burma, Bangladesh, North Vietnam, and Cambodia. By the mid-1980s, CAAC had long-haul service to the United States, Europe, the Middle East, and Australia, mainly using American Boeing aircraft, while continuing to use Soviet aircraft on routes to Eastern Europe.

This is an incomplete list of destinations served by CAAC:

Country	City	Airport	Notes
Australia	Sydney	Sydney Airport	
British Hong Kong	Hong Kong	Kai Tak Airport	
Bangladesh	Dhaka	Hazrat Shahjalal International Airport	
Bangladesh	Dhaka	Tejgaon Airport	
Burma	Mandalay	Mandalay Chanmyathazi Airport	
Burma	Yangon	Yangon International Airport	
Cambodia	Phnom Penh	Phnom Penh International Airport	
China	Aksu City	Aksu Hongqipo Airport	
China	Ankang	Ankang Wulipu Airport	
China	Baoshan	Baoshan Yunrui Airport	
China	Baotou	Baotou Donghe Airport	
China	Beijing	Beijing Capital International Airport	Hub
China	Beijing	Beijing Nanyuan Airport	
China	Changchun	Changchun Dafangshen Airport	
China	Changsha	Changsha Datuopu Airport	
China	Chifeng	Unknown	
China	Chengdu	Chengdu Shuangliu International Airport	Hub
China	Chongqing	Chongqing Baishiyi Airport	
China	Dalian	Dalian Zhoushuizi International Airport	
China	Fuzhou	Fuzhou Yixu Airport	
China	Guangzhou	Guangzhou Baiyun International Airport	Hub
China	Guilin	Guilin Qifengling Airport	
China	Guiyang	Unknown	
China	Haikou	Haikou Dayingshan Airport	
China	Hailar	Hulunbuir Hailar Airport	
China	Hami	Hami Yizhou Airport	
China	Hangzhou	Hangzhou Jianqiao Airport	
China	Harbin	Harbin Taiping International Airport	
China	Hefei	Hefei Luogang Airport	
China	Hefei	Hefei Sanlijie Airport	
China	Hohhot	Hohhot Baita International Airport	
China	Hotan	Hotan Kungang Airport	
China	Jinan	Jinan Zhangzhuang Airport	
China	Jiayuguan City/Jiuquan	Jiayuguan Jiuquan Airport	
China	Karamay	Unknown	
China	Kashgar	Kashgar Laining International Airport	
China	Kunming	Kunming Wujiaba International Airport	
China	Kuqa	Kuqa Airport	
China	Lanzhou	Gongxingdun Airport	
China	Lanzhou	Lanzhou Zhongchuan International Airport	
China	Lhasa	Lhasa Gonggar Airport	
China	Nanchang	Nanchang Xiangtang Airport	
China	Nanjing	Nanjing Dajiaochang Airport	
China	Nanning	Nanning Wuxu International Airport	
China	Ningbo	Ningbo Lishe International Airport	
China	Pu'er City	Pu'er Simao Airport	
China	Qingdao	Qingdao Liuting International Airport	
China	Sanya	Sanya Phoenix International Airport	
China	Shanghai	Shanghai Hongqiao International Airport	Hub
China	Shanghai	Shanghai Longhua Airport	
China	Sharasume	Unknown	
China	Shenyang	Shenyang Dongta Airport	Hub
China	Tacheng	Unknown	
China	Taiyuan	Taiyuan Wusu International Airport	
China	Tianjin	Tianjin Binhai International Airport	
China	Tongliao	Tongliao Airport	
China	Ürümqi	Ürümqi Diwopu International Airport	
China	Wuhan	Wuhan Wangjiadun Airport	
China	Xiamen	Xiamen Gaoqi International Airport	
China	Xi'an	Xi'an Xiguan Airport	Hub
China	Xichang	Xichang Qingshan Airport	
China	Xilinhot	Xilinhot Airport	
China	Xining	Xining Lejiawan Airport	
China	Yantai	Yantai Laishan Airport	
China	Yinchuan	Yinchuan Xihuayuan Airport	
China	Yining	Yining Airport	
China	Zhanjiang	Zhanjiang Airport	
China	Zhaotong	Zhaotong Airport	
China	Zhengzhou	Zhengzhou Dongjiao Airport	
Ethiopia	Addis Ababa	Addis Ababa Bole International Airport	
France	Paris	Charles de Gaulle Airport	
Indonesia	Jakarta	Halim Perdanakusuma International Airport	
Indonesia	Jakarta	Kemayoran Airport	
Indonesia	Jakarta	Soekarno–Hatta International Airport	
Iraq	Baghdad	Saddam International Airport	
Japan	Nagasaki	Nagasaki Airport	
Japan	Osaka	Itami Airport	
Japan	Tokyo	Haneda Airport	
Kuwait	Kuwait City	Kuwait International Airport	
Laos	Vientiane	Wattay International Airport	
Malaysia	Kuala Lumpur	Sultan Abdul Aziz Shah Airport	
Mongolia	Ulaanbaatar	Buyant-Ukhaa International Airport	
North Korea	Pyongyang	Pyongyang International Airport	align=center|
North Vietnam	Hanoi	Gia Lam Airport	
Philippines	Manila	Ninoy Aquino International Airport	
Pakistan	Karachi	Jinnah International Airport	
Romania	Bucharest	Henri Coandă International Airport	
Singapore	Singapore	Changi Airport	
Soviet Union	Irkutsk	International Airport Irkutsk	
Soviet Union	Moscow	Sheremetyevo International Airport	
Switzerland	Zürich	Zürich Airport	
Thailand	Bangkok	Don Mueang International Airport	
United Arab Emirates	Sharjah	Sharjah International Airport	
United Kingdom	London	Gatwick Airport	
United States	Los Angeles	Los Angeles International Airport	
United States	New York City	John F. Kennedy International Airport	
United States	San Francisco	San Francisco International Airport	
West Germany	Frankfurt	Frankfurt Airport	
Yugoslavia	Belgrade	Belgrade Nikola Tesla Airport	

== Fleet ==
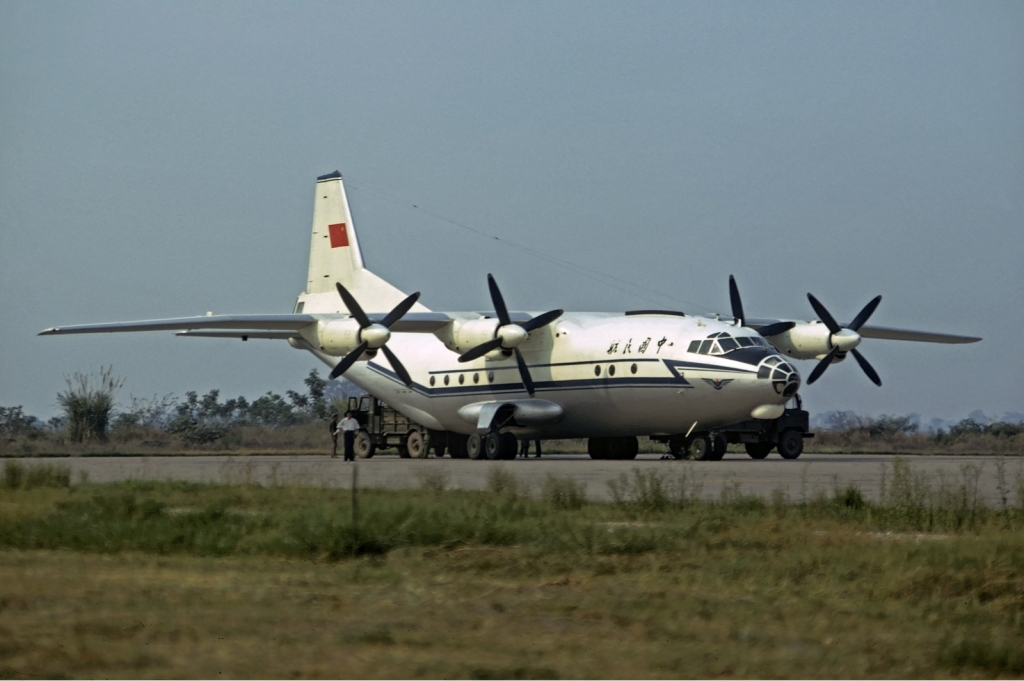
CAAC Antonov An-12 at Wattay International Airport, 1975

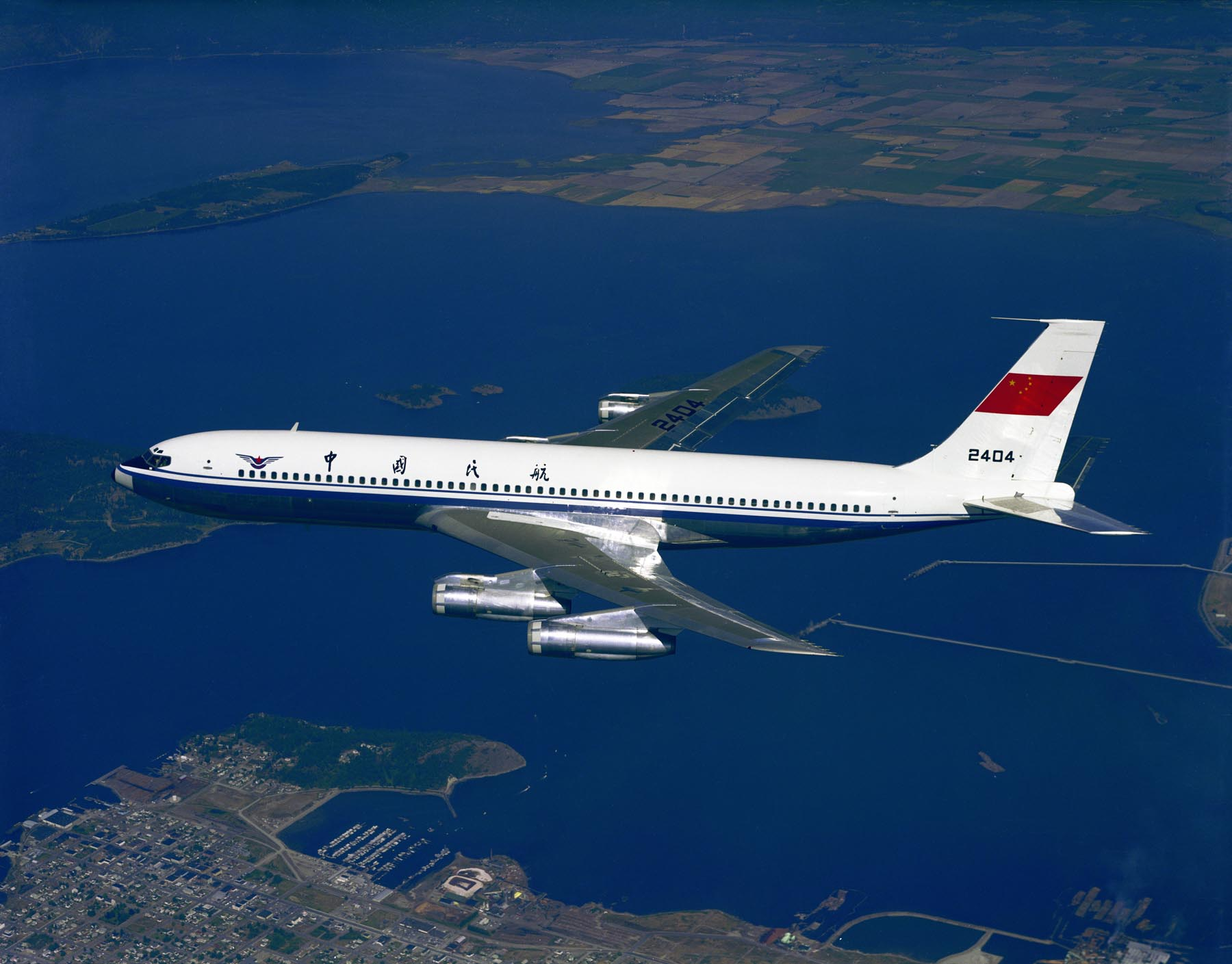
CAAC Boeing 707 over Anacortes, United States, ca. 1980

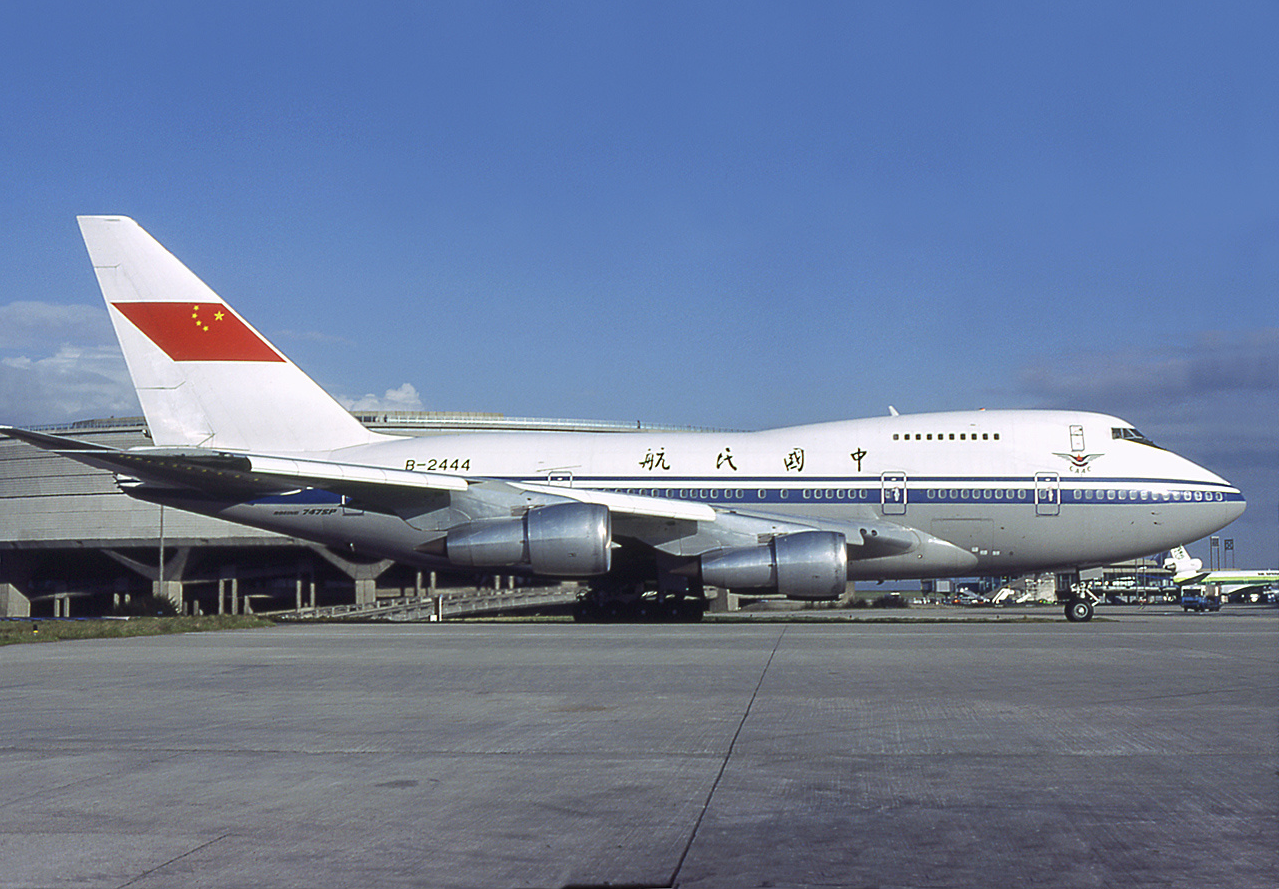
A CAAC Boeing 747SP at Charles de Gaulle Airport, Paris, 1981

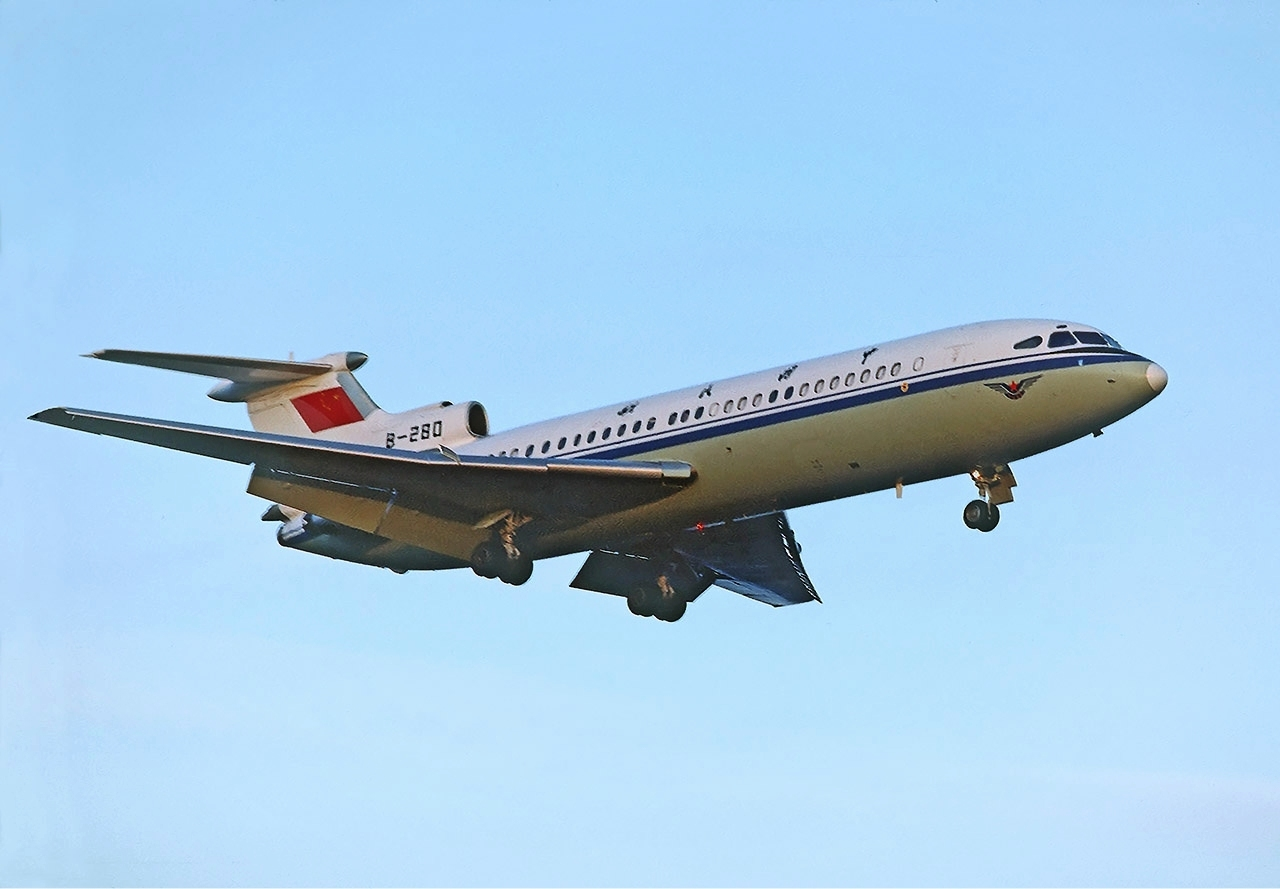
CAAC Trident approaching Arlanda Airport, 1979

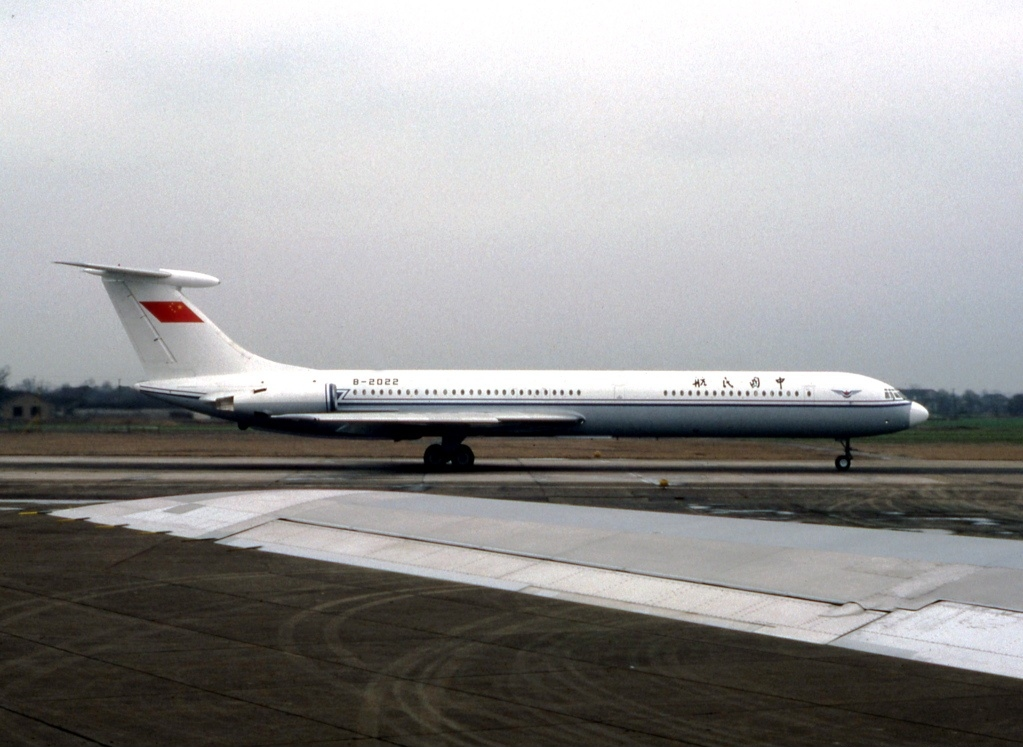
CAAC Il-62 at Hongqiao Airport, 1980

CAAC consisted of the following aircraft:

CAAC civil fleet
Aircraft	Total	Introduced	Retired	Notes
Airbus A310-300	5	1985	1988	All transferred to China Eastern Airlines
Antonov An-2	138	Unknown	Unknown	
Antonov An-12	14	1968	1988	
Antonov An-24	78	1969	1988	
Antonov An-26	66	1974	1988	
Antonov An-30	13	1975	1988	
British Aerospace 146-100	10	1986	1988	
Boeing 707-320B	10	1973	1988	
Boeing 737-200	11	1983	1988	
Boeing 737-300	4	1986	1988	
Boeing 747-200B	4	1983	1988	
Boeing 747SP	4	1980	1988	All transferred to Air China
Boeing 757-200	2	1987	1988	All transferred to China Southern Airlines
Boeing 767-200ER	4	1985	1988	All transferred to Air China
Convair CV-240	1	1949	Unknown	
Douglas DC-3	1	Unknown	Unknown	
Harbin Y-11	41	1976	1988	
Harbin Y-12	3	1988	1988	
Hawker Siddeley Trident 1E	4	1970	1975	
Hawker Siddeley Trident 2E	35	1972	1988	
Hawker Siddeley Trident 3B	2	1975	1981	
Ilyushin Il-12	4	1948	1987	
Ilyushin Il-14	53	1954	1988	
Ilyushin Il-18	17	1964	1988	
Ilyushin Il-62	7	1971	1987	
Lisunov Li-2	31	1949	1987	
McDonnell Douglas MD-82	8	1983	1988	
Mil Mi-8	57	1972	1988	
Tupolev Tu-154M	12	1985	1988	
Vickers Viscount	7	1963	1983	

== Accidents and incidents ==
=== 1950s ===
- On 16 April 1952, Aero Ae-45 952 crashed on landing at Majiagou airfield, Harbin following forest spraying; no casualties.
- On 30 August 1955, Lisunov Li-2 322 swerved off the runway on landing at Beijing Xijiao Airport after losing hydraulic power; all four crew survived and the aircraft was undamaged, but a 12-year-old boy crouching in the grass and unnoticed by the crew died after he was hit by the aircraft. The hydraulic failure was caused by poor maintenance.
- On 9 July 1956, Aero Ae-45 958 crashed in Lushi County, Henan Province during a geological survey flight due to an inaccurate map and flawed operation protocol, killing all four on board.
- On 7 August 1956, Douglas C-47 101 crashed into a pit while taxiing near a short airstrip at Baoding; all 10 on board survived. The aircraft had been re-engined with Shvetsov ASh-62 engines.
- On 5 April 1958, Ilyushin Il-14 632 struck a mountain 70 km (43 mi) from Xi'an while flying too low, killing all 14 on board. The crew had violated minimum safe altitude requirements.
- On 20 August 1958, Flight 502, Douglas C-47 106 lost control and crashed in Lai'an County, probably due to encountering turbulence in a thunderstorm, killing all 13 on board.
- On 11 October 1959, Ilyushin Il-14M 646 crashed short of the runway at Diwopu International Airport due to poor visibility stemming from a dust storm; no casualties.

=== 1960s ===
- On 29 July 1960, a CAAC Shijiazhuang Y-5 crashed at Jinniu District, Chengdu after failing to recover from a dive, reportedly killing two.
- On 14 August 1960, Shijiazhuang Y-5A 8307 was struck from behind by Shijiazhuang Y-5A 8311 over Chuanshan District, Suining. Both aircraft crashed, killing all six on board both aircraft. For unknown reasons, 8311 did not respond to the ground controller's instructions and warnings before the collision.
- On 21 August 1961, Shijiazhuang Y-5 18168 crashed on climbout at Henchuan due to a broken propeller blade; both pilots survived.
- On 31 August 1961, Shijiazhuang Y-5 107 struck a hill in Chengdu in cloud during a training flight, killing both crew. The instructor and student pilot were both inexperienced in IMC.
- On 26 September 1961, Shijiazhuang Y-5 18188 struck Qinglongshan (Blue Dragon Mountain), Henan Province, killing all 15 on board. The aircraft entered IMC conditions and the pilots, not qualified to fly in IMC, asked ATC to ascend to a high altitude to climb out of the clouds. ATC never responded and the pilots decided to descend below the clouds to get visual reference and struck the mountain in the process.
- On 16 June 1962, Shijiazhuang Y-5 18090 flipped over on landing at Zhangjiakou; no casualties. The trainee copilot applied the brakes by mistake during landing.
- On 6 September 1962, Shijiazhuang Y-5 18237, Shijiazhuang Y-5 48484 and Douglas C-47 105 were written off at Longhua Airport following damage by a tornado that had spawned from Typhoon Amy.
- On 1 September 1964, Shijiazhuang Y-5 18185 hit powerlines and crashed in Liaoyang County while spraying pesticide, killing both pilots. The pilot probably left the spraying area to dump leftover pesticide before returning.
- On 15 February 1966, Shijiazhuang Y-5 18152 struck trees and crashed in a mountainous area in Yongdeng County, Gansu Province due to a navigation error; all four on board survived.
- On 26 April 1966, Shijiazhuang Y-5 18027 crashed in Zhenning Buyi and Miao Autonomous County, Guizhou Province during an aerial seeding flight, killing both pilots. The aircraft entered a valley that it could not climb out of and it crashed and burned.
- On 27 July 1966, Shijiazhuang Y-5 18116 crashed in Shayang County while spraying crops; both pilots survived. The pilot pulled up without increasing engine power and made a right turn. As a result, the aircraft entered a dive and crashed.
- On 20 March 1967, Shijiazhuang Y-5 8205 struck a power line and crashed in the Chang'an District after drifting off course during a low-altitude training flight, killing all three on board.
- On 1 July 1967, Shijiazhuang Y-5 8007 crashed in Changxing County while crop spraying; both pilots survived. The crew had misjudged the height of a mountain and could not avoid a collision with terrain.
- On 22 October 1967, Shijiazhuang Y-5 8025 struck Hou'erbao mountain (Wen County) during an aeromagnetic survey flight, killing all seven on board. Due to the remote location, the wreckage was not found until July 1968; CFIT in poor visibility was blamed.
- On 10 September 1968, Shijiazhuang Y-5 8420 struck a mountain at Mianyang during an IFR training flight, killing both pilots. The aircraft had strayed off the planned route by around 30 km (19 mi); the pilot probably failed to use navaids to check the aircraft's position.
- On 5 December 1968, a CAAC Ilyushin Il-14 crashed near Beijing Capital International Airport after an unexplained loss of altitude on approach (probably due to wind shear), killing 13 of 14 on board, including scientist Guo Yonghuai.The same day, another Il-14 (640) also crashed at Beijing Capital International Airport due to pilot error, killing both pilots. This crash site was only 200 m (660 ft) from the first Il-14 crash.
- On 15 November 1969, Ilyushin Il-14 618 struck Mount Taiping, Wuning County at 600 m (2,000 ft) following a deviation from the flight course while flying through clouds, killing the six crew. The height of the mountain was incorrectly listed as 508 m (1,667 ft) on aeronautical charts when the actual height was 841 m (2,759 ft).

=== 1970s ===
- On 15 October 1970, Harbin Z-5 (Chinese-built Mil Mi-4) 716 crashed at Beijing Capital International Airport due to tail rotor failure, killing all 10 on board. The separation was due to a design and manufacturing defect.
- On 14 November 1970, Ilyushin Il-14 616 struck a mountain near Guiyang. The crew deviated from the glidescope during the approach, probably to descend below clouds, after which the aircraft struck a hill and crashed.
- On 30 May 1972, Shijiazhuang Y-5 8316 crashed at Lingyuan while forest spraying; both pilots survived. After takeoff, the aircraft could not clear a ridge and it crashed.
- In May 1972, a CAAC Lisunov Li-2 overshot the runway at Dalian Zhoushuizi Airport, killing six.
- On 20 June 1972, Shijiazhuang Y-5 8263 struck trees and crashed in Jiulongpo District during a low-altitude practice flight; both pilots survived. The crew failed to maintain terrain clearance.
- On 26 June 1972, Shijiazhuang Y-5 8270 struck a hill 30 km (19 mi) from Pingyuanjie Airport during a forest sowing flight, killing both pilots. The pilots probably descended blind after losing visual reference with the ground, striking the hill in the process.
- On 1 September 1972, Shijiazhuang Y-5 8030 force-landed in Taigu District following an in-flight fire; all 16 on board survived. The fire was caused by a maintenance error.
- On 14 January 1973, Ilyushin Il-14 644 struck a mountain near Guiyang, killing all 29 on board. The aircraft had deviated from the flight route due to pilot error.
- On 30 September 1973, Shijiazhuang Y-5 8079 crashed in mountains while forest spraying, killing both pilots.
- On 30 November 1974, CAAC Mil Mi-8 802 lost control while hovering and crashed at Kemerovo Airport; the helicopter was being delivered to CAAC.
- On 30 March 1975, Shijiazhuang Y-5 8091 struck a mountain in Dangtu County, Anhui Province while forest spraying.
- On 25 July 1975, Shijiazhuang Y-5A 8265 crashed into a reservoir in Jianyang during a test flight after flying into a thunderstorm, killing all three on board. Neither the crew nor ATC realized the sudden change in weather along the flight route.
- On 18 September 1975, Shijiazhuang Y-5 8344 struck a mountain in Lingyuan while on a flight to spray insecticide, killing one of the pilots. The crew failed to see and avoid the mountain.
- On 21 January 1976, Antonov An-24RV B-492 crashed on approach to Changsha Huanghua Airport, killing all 42 on board. Witnesses reported the aircraft descending below clouds and could not maintain a stable altitude before it banked left and crashed. Investigators could not come to a firm conclusion as to the cause because the aircraft did not have flight recorders, but left engine failure due to icing was blamed.
- On 25 February 1976, Shijiazhuang Y-5 8007 struck a mountain in Langshan County during an aerial seeding flight, killing both pilots. En route to the operations area, the crew radioed that they were taking a detour to the east and likely struck the mountain in the process.
- On 1 June 1976, Shijiazhuang Y-5 8003 crashed at Dongzhai Town, Shanxi Province while forest spraying; both pilots survived. The engine had failed due to pilot error.
- On 27 February 1977, Ilyushin Il-18B B-204 descended too low and crashed on approach to Shenyang Dongta Airport in fog due to pilot and ATC errors, killing all 25 on board; one person on the ground also died.
- On 16 June 1977, the sole passenger on board Lisunov Li-2 303 en route from Urumqi to Hami threatened the crew with explosives and demanded to be flown to the Mongolian People's Republic. The crew instead diverted to a military airfield in Turpan, Xinjiang. But before the aircraft landed, the hijacker broke a cabin window and jumped out; he did not survive.
- On 17 June 1977, Shijiazhuang Y-5 8107 crashed in Gao'an County during an air dropping flight, killing three of five on board. The crew had become disorientated due to bad weather.
- On 17 July 1977, Aerospatiale Alouette III 755 crashed in Linwu County, Hunan Province during a mineral survey flight due to engine failure. All four on board were killed.
- On 8 January 1979, Lisunov Li-2 313 stalled and crashed shortly after takeoff from Shenyang Dongta Airport due to double engine failure. There were no casualties. The pilots selected a nearly empty fuel tank, causing both engines to fail. The pilots then put the aircraft into a stall after which it crashed.
- On 25 April 1979, Lisunov Li-2 302 stalled and crashed on takeoff from Diwopu Airport during a training flight due to crew errors; all four on board survived. During the takeoff run, the aircraft began gradually veering right, but the crew did not take action in time. Just before the aircraft was to veer off the runway, the instructor reduced power to the left engine while the trainee pilot pulled up at the same time.

=== 1980s ===
- On 20 March 1980, Antonov An-24RV B-484 stalled and crashed near Changsha Datuopu Airport while attempting a go-around, killing all 26 on board. The aircraft was operating a Kunming–Guiyang–Changsha passenger service.
- On 23 April 1980, Shijiazhuang Y-5 B-8244 struck a mountain in Chengguan District during a training flight while attempting to return to Donggang Airport due to below-optimal conditions, killing both pilots.
- On 21 April 1981, MBB Bo 105C B-763 crashed shortly after takeoff from an oil rig in the Gulf of Tonkin off the Leizhou Peninsula, probably due to pilot spatial disorientation, killing three of five on board. The two survivors were not wearing seat belts and escaped the sinking helicopter.
- On 26 April 1982, Flight 3303, a Hawker Siddeley Trident 2E (B-266), struck a mountain in Gongchang County (60 km southeast of Guilin) while on approach to Guilin, killing all 112 on board. The aircraft was attached to the PLAAF's 34th Air Division and operating for CAAC.
- On 24 December 1982, Flight 2311, an Ilyushin Il-18B (B-202), caught fire while landing at Guangzhou Baiyun Airport, killing 25 of 69 on board. The fire was caused by a passenger's cigarette.
- On 5 January 1983, an off-duty pilot hijacked Flight 5543, operated by Ilyushin Il-14P 662. The hijacker shot the pilot dead, after which another crew member killed the hijacker. The aircraft landed safely at Luqiao air base in Taizhou.
- On 9 April 1983, two men hijacked Ilyushin Il-14 606 10 minutes after takeoff during a flight from Wuhan to Guangzhou via Changsha. One hijacker, Zhang Yufa, handed a threatening note to flight attendant Huang Shengxin, claiming that he would blow up the aircraft in 30 minutes. Shengxin nodded and smiled, then pressed the emergency alarm when Yufa turned around. Pilot Zhang Yuansheng sent navigator Mao Shixing to the cabin to assess the situation while radio operator Zhao Haisheng guarded the cockpit door. The crew decided to immediately return to Changsha. Changsha Airport went on alert, with more than 200 staff at their posts and 13 vehicles (including fire engines, ambulances and passenger stairs) in position. The crew turned back at 2,100 m (6,900 ft). The navigator and radio operator locked the cockpit door; Captain Yuansheng and copilot Jiao Shaosheng then performed high-speed maneuvers to throw the hijackers off balance, while flight attendant Shengxin calmly handed out sick bags while watching the hijacker. The aircraft descended to 500 m (1,600 ft). The hijackers had enough and detonated explosives, blowing a hole in the fuselage. One hijacker, Zhang Yuqi, was killed instantly while Yufa fell out of the aircraft into the Xiang River and died as well. The crew quickly moved passengers away from the hole. Control became difficult, but the crew remained calm and landed safely at Changsha Airport with no other casualties.
- On 14 September 1983, Flight 264, a Hawker Siddeley Trident 2E (B-264), was struck on its side by a PLAAF Harbin H-5 bomber while taxiing at Guilin Qifengling Airport. 11 of 106 on board were killed.
- On 18 January 1985, Flight 5109, an Antonov An-24B (B-434), crashed during drizzle and fog conditions while performing a missed approach to Jinan, killing 38 of 41 on board.
- On 22 October 1985, Shorts 360-100 B-3606 was written off after overshooting the runway on landing at Enshi Airport. All 25 on board survived.
- On 15 December 1986, Antonov An-24RV B-3413 crashed while attempting to return to Lanzhou after an engine failed due to icing, killing 6 of 44 on board.
- On 16 June 1987, Boeing 737-2T4 B-2514 collided with a PLAAF Shenyang J-6 at Fuzhou Airport. The J-6 crashed, killing its pilot while the 737 landed safely.
- On 30 August 1987, Shijiazhuang Y-5 B-8329 struck power lines and crashed on climbout from Erdaohezi Airport due to loss of engine power, killing the pilot and injuring the instructor pilot. The vaporizer heating tube on the engine had burned through due to poor maintenance.
- On 30 May 1988, Shijiazhuang Y-5B B-8167 struck the side of a cloud-shrouded mountain in Changsha while flying too low, killing all nine on board. The pilots did not follow minimum safe altitude requirements.
- On 31 August 1988, CAAC Flight 301, a Hawker Siddeley Trident 2E (B-2218), struck the approach lights at Kai Tak Airport and struck a lip, causing the right landing gear to collapse; the aircraft then slid off the runway into Kowloon Bay, killing 7 of the 89 on board. The cause was undetermined, but windshear may have been a factor.

=== 1990s ===
- On 2 October 1990, CAAC Flight 3523, a Boeing 757 (B-2812), was struck by a hijacked Xiamen Airlines Boeing 737, killing 46 of 122 on board.

== See also ==
- List of defunct airlines of China
