= Chongqing Baishiyi Airport =

Military airport in Chongqing, China

Chongqing Baishiyi Airport 重庆白市驿机场
- IATA: none; ICAO: none

Summary
- Airport type: Military
- Owner: People's Liberation Army
- Operator: People's Liberation Army Air Force
- Serves: Chongqing
- Location: Chongqing, China
- Opened: 1936
- Passenger services ceased: 22 January 1990
- Hub for: China Southwest Airlines (1987–1990)
- Coordinates: 29°29′46″N 106°21′32″E

Map

Runways
Direction	Length		Surface
Direction	m	ft	Surface
01/19	2,272	7,500	Concrete

Chongqing Baishiyi Airport (or Baishiyi Air Base) is a People's Liberation Army Air Force in the city of Chongqing in Southwestern China, located about 21 km (13 miles) northwest of the city center. It served as the city's civilian airport until 21 January 1990, when all commercial flights were transferred to the newly built Chongqing Jiangbei International Airport.

== History ==
During the War of Resistance/World War II, the airport was known as Peishiyi (Paishihyi) Airfield (Wades-Gile)/Baishiyi (Standard Pinyin), and was the Chinese Air Force base for the 4th Pursuit Group composed primarily of Polikarpov I-15 and I-16 fighter squadrons assigned for the defense of then-wartime capital of Chongqing; an I-15bis fighter of 21st PS, 4th PG piloted by Maj. Liu Zhesheng shot down a Mitsubishi Ki-21 heavy-bomber over Bashiyi air base on 6 June 1940. The airport was then used by the United States Army Air Forces Fourteenth Air Force as the U.S. entered the war following the attack on Pearl Harbor. Baishiyi was a command and control base, being used late in the war as the headquarters of the 68th Composite Wing, which controlled the combat operations of the 23d Fighter Group and the 308th Bombardment Group. In addition C-47 Skytrain transport aircraft used the airport flying troops and supplies into the area as well as combat wounded to rear areas. The Americans remained at the airport after the war ended, the facility becoming the headquarters of the China Air Service Command, which supplied equipment and other logistical support to American and Chinese forces, along with being headquarters of Fourteenth Air Force. The American units began closing down in early 1946, with the last personnel of the 10th Weather Squadron departing the facility on 31 July 1946.

== Former airlines and destinations ==
Between 1939 and 1949, Baishiyi airport had served destinations internationally and domestically, and was the third airport ever in China to be put to operation. Before 1990, it was a primary hub for China Southwest Airlines.

Airlines	Destinations
C.A.A.C Airlines	Beijing/Capital, Chengdu, Guangzhou, Guiyang, Guilin/Qifengling, Hong Kong/Kai Tak, Kunming/Wujiaba, Rangoon, Shanghai/Hongqiao, Wuhan/Nanhu, Wuhan/Wangjiadun, Xi'an/Xiguan
C.N.A.C	Beiping, Canton, Chengdu, Hanoi/Gia Lam, Hangzhou, Hong Kong, Kunming, Kweilin, Lashio, Matsuyama, Nanking, Qingdao, Rangoon, Shanghai-Longhua, Singapore/Kallang, Xi'an/Xiguan
Central Air Transport	Beijing-Nanyuan, Canton, Chengdu, Kweilin, Hankou, Hong Kong/Kai Tak, Kunming, Matsuyama, Nanjing, Shanghai/Longhua, Tianjin, Xi'an-Xiguan
China Southwest Airlines	Bangkok-Don Muang, Beijing/Capital, Chengdu, Fuzhou/Yixu, Guiyang, Guilin/Qifengling, Hong Kong/Kai Tak, Kunming/Wujiaba, Lanzhou, Nagoya/Komaki, Shanghai/Hongqiao, Wuhan/Nanhu, Ürümqi, Xi'an/Xiguan
Cathay Dragon	Hong Kong/Kai Tak

== Current Military use ==
It currently is home to the 98th Fighter Brigade and 99th Fighter Brigade.

== Accidents and incidents ==
- On the night of 18 January 1988, China Southwest Airlines flight 4146, an Ilyushin Il-18 arriving from Beijing, crashes into a terrain 5 kilometers from the airport due to an inflight fire caused by an engine fire and explodes, killing 108 of its occupants.
