= Shanghai Longhua Airport =

Former airport of Shanghai, China (1922–1966); currently a heliport since 2013

Shanghai Longhua Airport Shanghai Lunghwa Airport 上海龙华机场
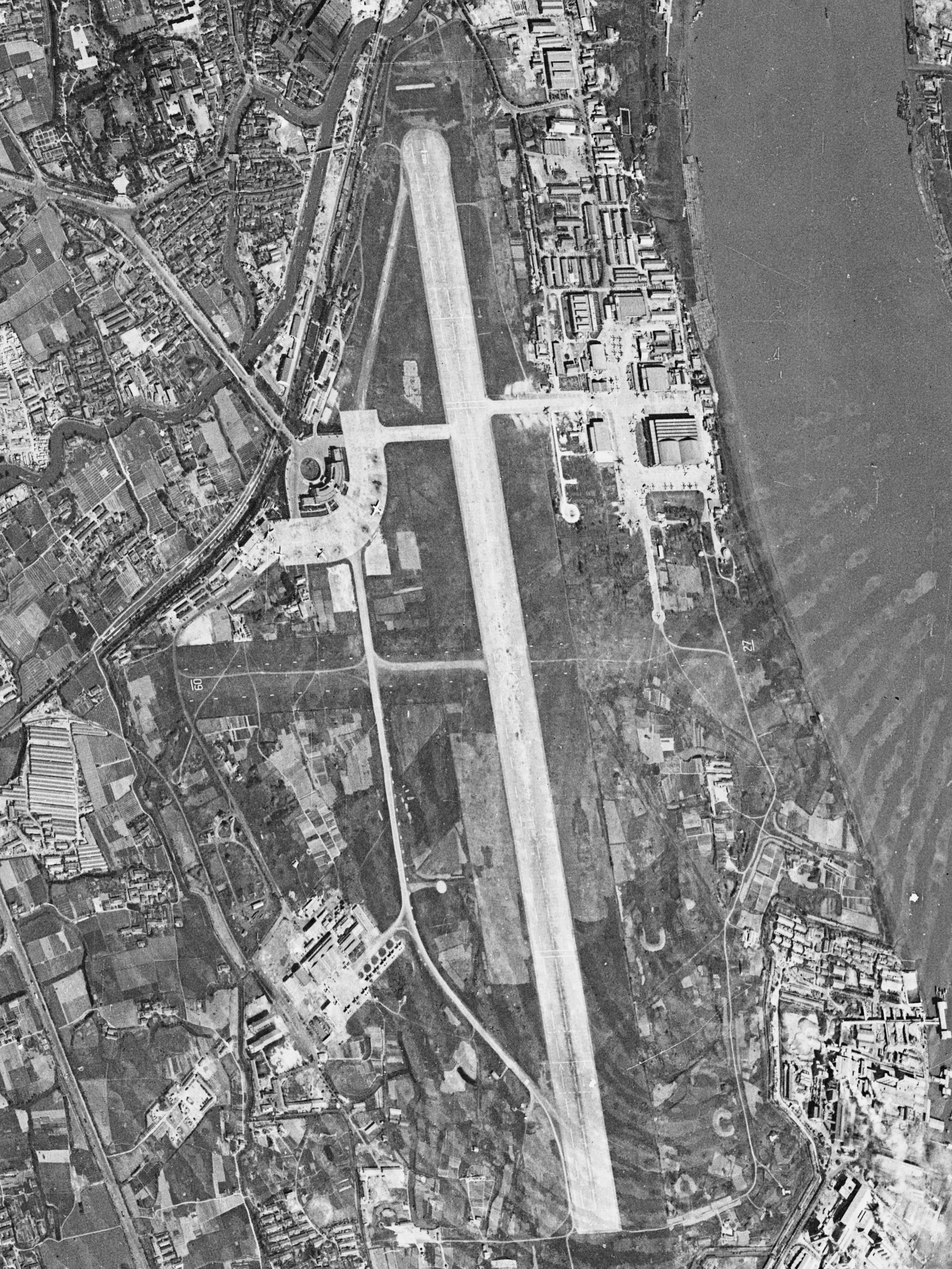
- IATA: none; ICAO: ZSSL

Summary
- Airport type: Heliport
- Serves: Shanghai
- Location: Longhua, Xuhui, Shanghai, China
- Opened: As airport: June 1929; As heliport: December 2017
- Closed: June 2011 (fixed-wing aircraft)
- Passenger services ceased: August 1966
- Coordinates: 31°10′1″N 121°27′13″E
- Interactive map of Shanghai Longhua Airport; Shanghai Lunghwa Airport

Runways
Direction	Length		Surface
Direction	ft	m	Surface
~~18/36~~	~~7,782~~	~~2,250~~	~~Concrete~~ (Closed)

Derived from nearby Longhua Temple, Shanghai Longhua Airport (ICAO: ZSSL), also romanised as Shanghai Lunghwa Airport, is a converted heliport located in Longhua Subdistrict in Xuhui District, 10 km (6.2 mi) south of downtown Shanghai, China, on the bank of the Huangpu River. It opened in June 1929 and served as the city's civilian airport until August 1966, when Shanghai Hongqiao International Airport reopened. Thereafter, it was one of two general aviation airports serving Shanghai and also served as an emergency landing site for police, fire and rescue operations southwest of the city. The airport was torn down in 2013 and reopened as a heliport.

== History ==
The site began airfield operations in late 1922 under the Beiyang government.

In the early 1930s, the main, semi circular Art Deco terminal was built, along with the main ATC tower on the top of the main terminal, which still exists today, making it the last structure still remaining on what was once the airport.

In the 1930s-1940s, during its golden age, the airport was known as the most popular airport for amphibious aircraft and the biggest airport of the Far East at the time.

After the Battle of Shanghai, Imperial Japanese Airways operated services from Longhua to Fukuoka and Taipei during the late 1930s and early 1940s. Additionally, the tarmac was expanded to accommodate at least 100 aircraft (before 1937, only 10 airplanes could be parked at the tarmac), 2 gravel runways were added, making Longhua Airport one of China's first airports with more than one runway built.

After the end of World War II, basic equipment such as power supply, radar, and communication systems were renovated and improved. Hence, the airport became a hub for China National Aviation Corporation (CNAC), as well as a famous stopover for many international airlines flying to Hong Kong, China, or Japan. Northwest Orient Airlines began service to Longhua in 1947, stopping there en route from the United States and Japan to the Philippines, and flew this route until suspending service in 1949. Hong Kong Airways began scheduled service to Hong Kong in 1948.

The People's Liberation Army took over the facility in 1949 following the Kuomintang Civil War, and maintained it as a civil airport until 1966 when all remaining passenger services were moved to Hongqiao.

A flying school used the old hangars of the airport. A single runway (18/36) is now built over and the old terminal is now surrounded by apartments. Although the runway no longer exists and a helipad is built nearby, an Ilysuhin Il-14 (formerly CAAC Airlines), an Antonov An-24 (formerly China Eastern Airlines), and 2 Chinese built Antonov An-2 (formerly used as a general aviation in the 1960s) still existed on the tarmac, although they are no longer usable.

KLM's first flight ever to Shanghai occurred in 1948, when it landed at Longhua after stopovers in Bangkok and Djakarta. Services halted in the Communist revolution and resumed again in 1996, which was then already operating at Hongqiao.

== Former airlines and destinations ==
Before 1949, several international airlines operated at this airport, which was the biggest in the Orient before being surpassed by others. It was taken over by the People's Liberation Army and still served as civil airport for CAAC until 1966.

Airlines	Destinations
Air France	Bangkok/Don Muang, Paris/Le Bourget, Paris/Orly, Rangoon, Saigon, Tokyo/Haneda
B.O.A.C	Bangkok/Don Muang, Bombay, Cairo, Calcutta, Darwin, Delhi/Safdarjung, Hong Kong/Kai Tak, Karachi, London(Croydon, Gatwick, Heathrow), Rangoon, Singapore/Kallang, Sydney, Tokyo/Haneda
CAAC Airlines	Beijing-Nanyuan, Beijing-Capital, Chengdu, Chongqing, Dalian, Guangzhou, Hefei, Xuzhou, Jinan, Hangzhou-Jianqiao, Hong Kong/Kai Tak, Hsinking, Kunming/Wujiaba, Lanzhou/Donggang, Nanchang, Nanjing-Dajiaochang, Tianjin, Wuhan, Xi'an-Xiguan
C.N.A.C	Beiping, Canton, Chengdu, Chungking, Dalian, Hangzhou, Hsinking, Hong Kong/Kai Tak, Kunming, Kweilin, Lashio, Matsuyama, Mukden, Nanking, Qingdao, Rangoon, Singapore/Kallang, Tianjin, Tokyo, Xi'an Xiguan
Canadian Pacific Air Lines	Hong Kong/Kai Tak, Honolulu, Tokyo/Haneda, Vancouver
Central Air Transport	Anchorage, Beijing-Nanyuan, Canton, Chengdu, Chungking, Dalian, Kweilin, Hankou, Hong Kong/Kai Tak, Kunming, Nanjing, Manila, San Francisco, San Diego, Seattle/Tacoma, Tianjin, Tokyo/Haneda, Xi'an-Xiguan
Civil Air Transport	Beiping, Canton, Chengdu, Chungking, Dalian, Hangzhou/Jianqiao, Haikou/Dayingshan, Hankou, Hong Kong/Kai Tak, Hsinking, Jinan, Kunming, Lanzhou/Donggang Nanjing, Qingdao, Rangoon, Taipei/Songshan, Tianjin, Xi'an-Xiguan
Eurasia Aviation Corporation	Hong Kong/Kai Tak, Peking, Lanchow, Ürümqi, Honan, Manzhouli, Hsinking
Hong Kong Airways	Hong Kong/Kai Tak
Imperial Japanese Airways	Fukuoka, Hsinking, Mukden, Osaka/Itami, Tokyo/Haneda, Taipei/Songshan
Japan Air Transport	Fukuoka, Hsinking, Mukden, Osaka/Itami, Tokyo, Taipei/Songshan
KLM	Amsterdam, Bangkok/Don Muang, Djakarta/Kemayoran
Manchuria Airlines	Dalian, Harbin/Majiagou, Shenyang/Dongta
Northwest Orient Airlines	Anchorage, Manila/Nielson, Manila/Ninoy Aquino, Minneapolis/St.Paul, San Francisco, Seoul, Seattle/Tacoma, Tokyo/Haneda
Pan American Airways System	Anchorage, Beiping, Canton, Chengdu, Guam, Hankow, Hong Kong/Kai Tak, Manila/Nielson, Naha, Nanjing/Dajiaochang, Los Angeles, Saigon, Saipan, San Francisco, Seattle/Tacoma, Sydney, Tianjin, Tokyo/Haneda, Honolulu, Xi'an-Xiguan
Philippine Airlines	Manila/Nielson, Manila/Ninoy Aquino
Scandinavian Airlines System	Athens/Ellinikon, Bangkok/Don Muang, Basrah, Bombay, Cairo, Calcutta, Chongqing/Baishiyi, Copenhagen, Hong Kong/Kai Tak, Jakarta/Kemayoran, Karachi, Manila/Nielson, Manila/Ninoy Aquino, Nice(France), Oslo/Fornebu, Rome/Ciampino, Singapore/Kallang, Stockholm/Bromma, Surabaya, Tokyo/Haneda

== Gallery ==
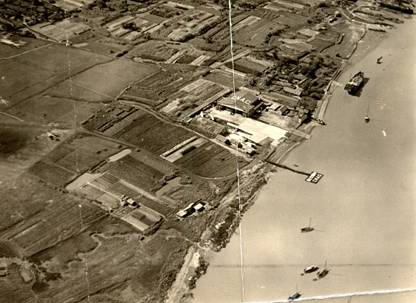
Aerial view of the airport, 1920s

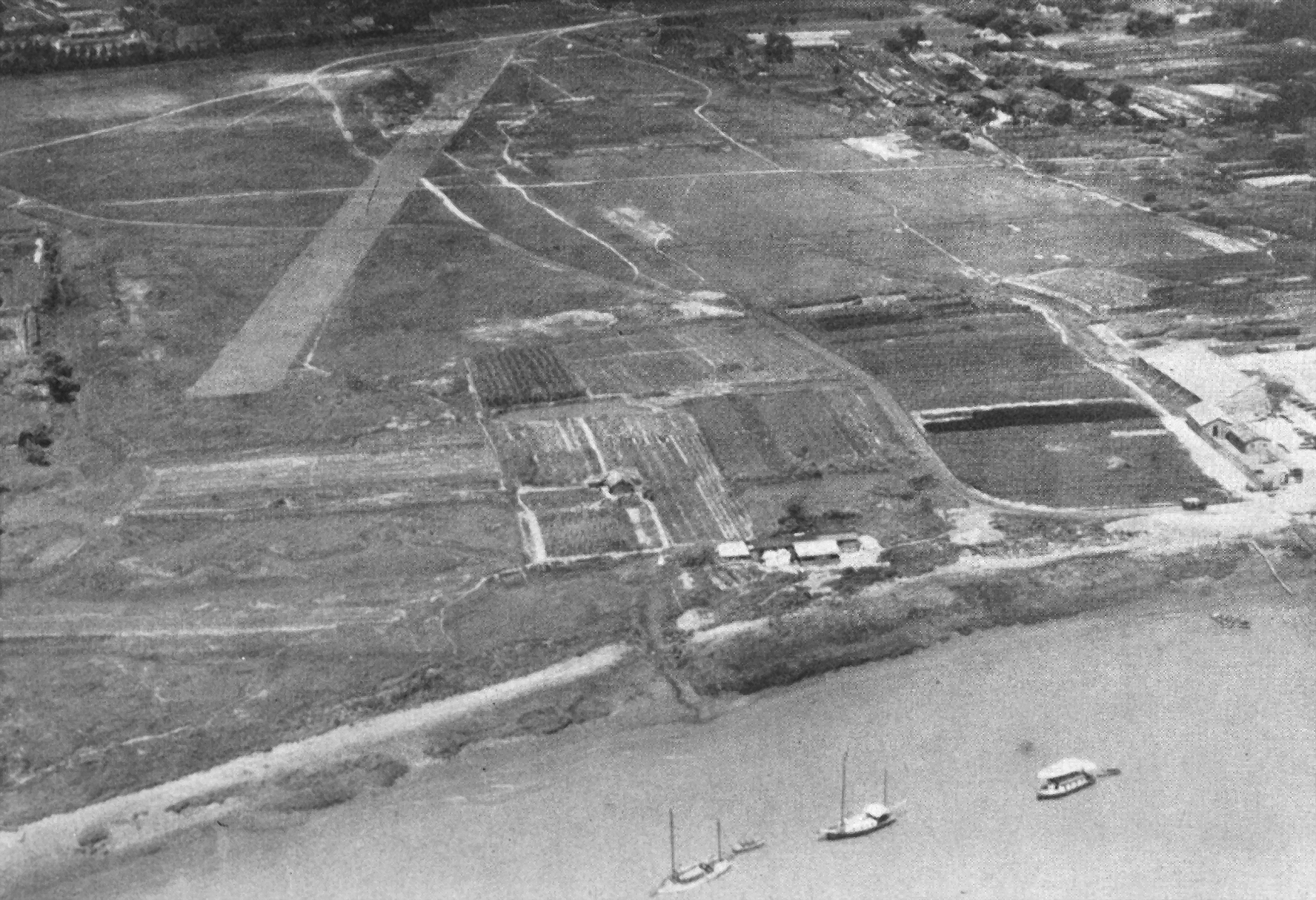
Aerial view of the airport, 1931

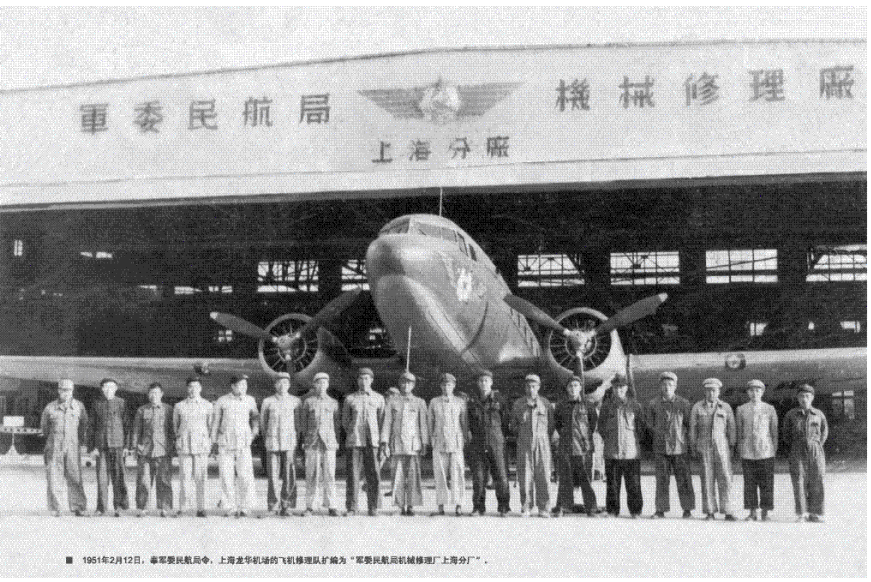
Aircraft at maintenance hangar, February 1951

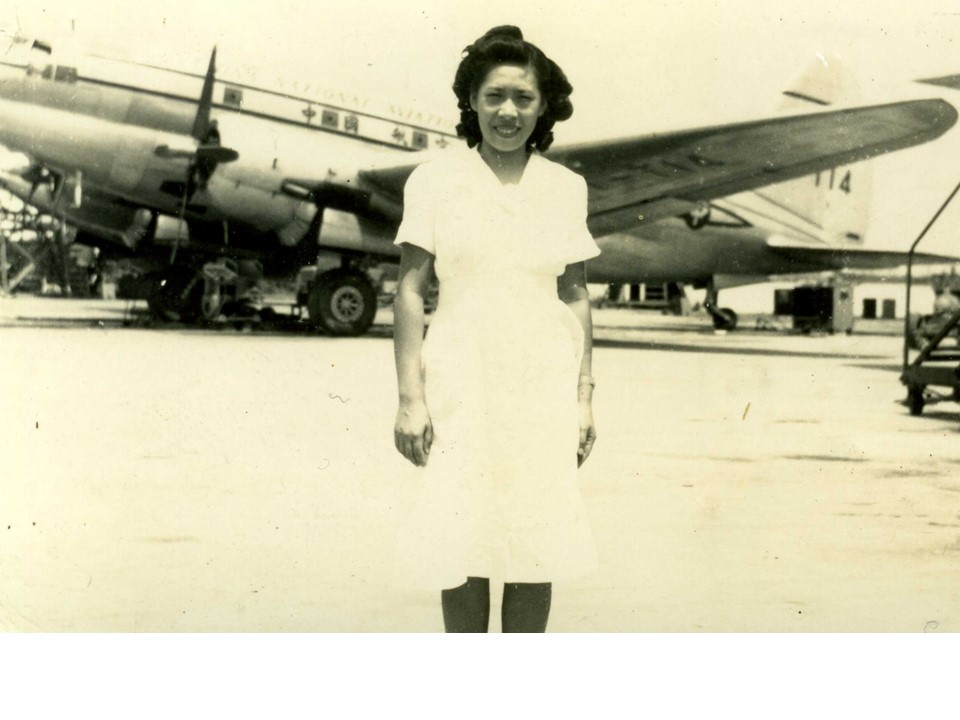
Rebecca Chan Chung at Longhua Airport, in front of a CNAC Curtiss C-46 (c.1947)

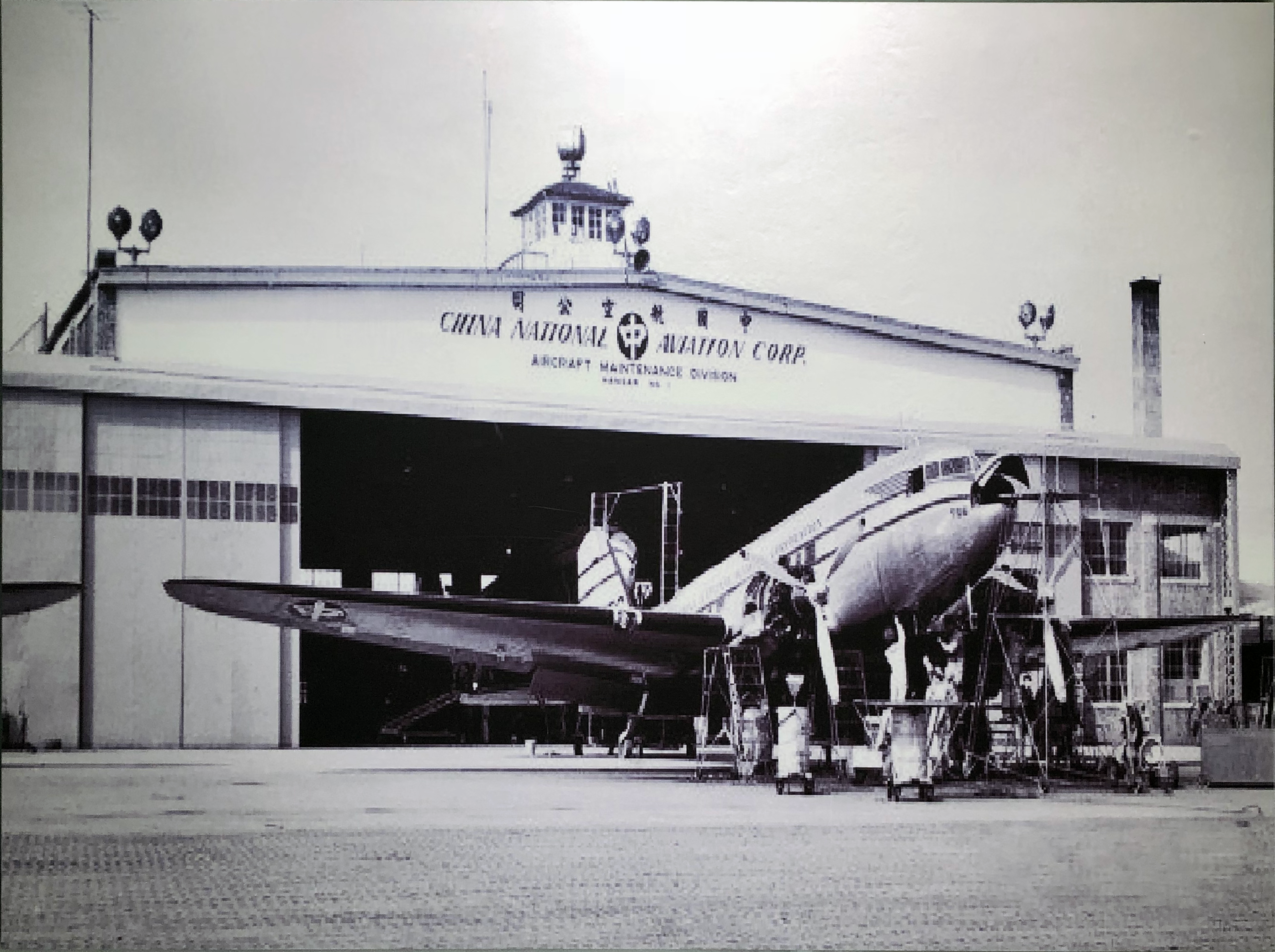
CNAC Douglas DC-3 being repaired at Longhua (1940s)

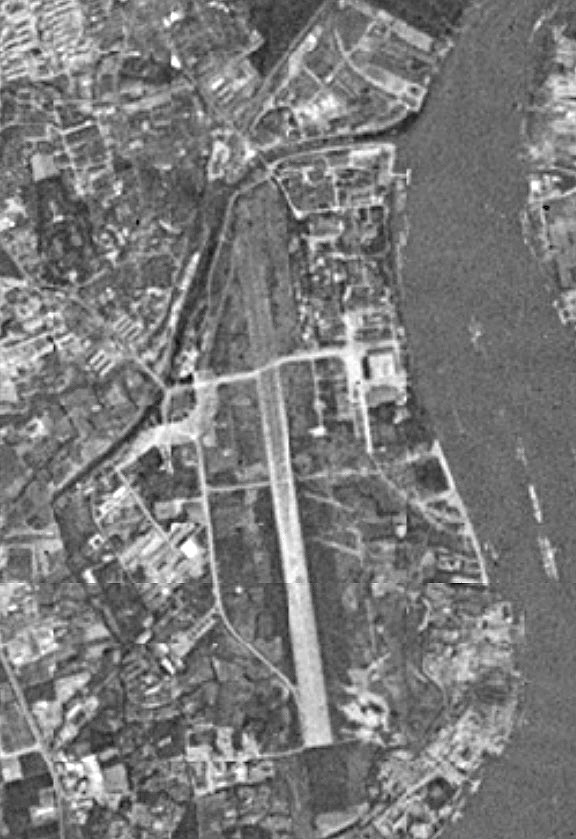
Satellite imagery of Shanghai Longhua Airport captured by the KH-9 Mapping Camera on 12 September, 1980.

Bird's eye view of Longhua Airport in 6 June, 2026

== Accidents and incidents ==
- On 16 December 1946, a CNAC Douglas DC-3 struck three parked aircraft, killing five.
- On the night of Christmas 1946, what was known as Shanghai's Black Christmas, a CNAC Curtiss C-46, enroute from Chongqing Baishiyi, crashed on approach near Longhua Airport in fog due to poor lighting on runways and poor visibility. Of 36 passengers on board, only 5 survived. On the same day, two DC-3s also crashed on approach in the same city, but both were destined for Jiangwan Airport. A total of 61 were killed in 3 respective aircraft, and a person on the ground.
