= Xi'an Xiguan Airport =

Former airport of Xi'an, Shaanxi, China (1924–1991)

Xi'an Xiguan Airport 西安西关机场
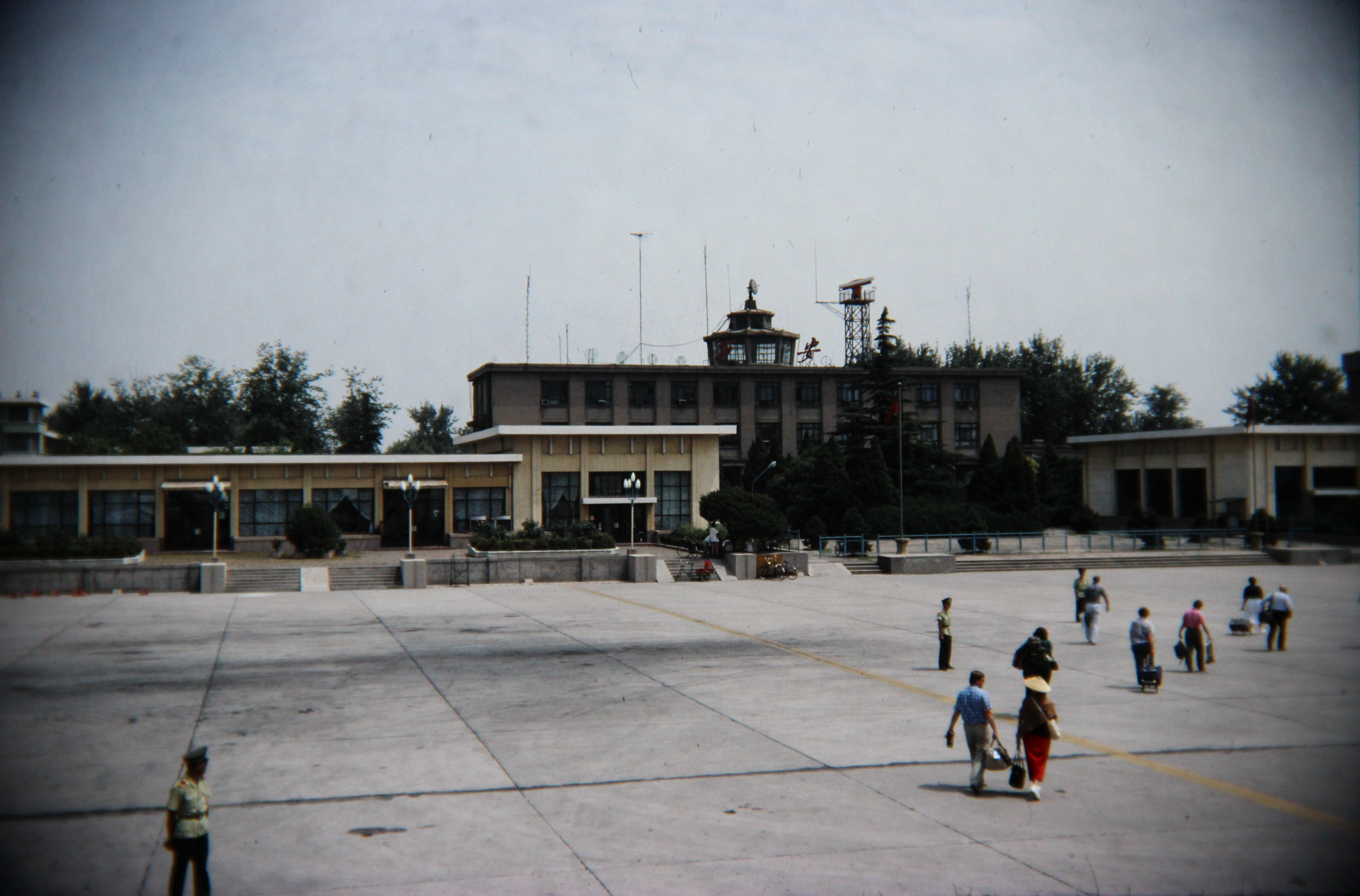
- Xiguan Airport before closure in July 1991
- IATA: SIA; ICAO: ZLSN

Summary
- Airport type: Defunct
- Serves: Xi'an
- Location: Lianhu, Xi'an, Shaanxi, China
- Opened: 1924
- Closed: 1 September 1991
- Hub for: China Northwest Airlines (1989–1991)
- Coordinates: 34.249°N 108.895°E

Map
- Location of airport in China

Runways
| Direction | Length | | Surface |
| Direction | m | ft | Surface |
|---|---|---|---|
| 05/23 | 2,800 | 9,186 | Concrete (Closed) |

Xi'an Xiguan Airport
- Simplified Chinese: 西安西关机场
- Traditional Chinese: 西安西關機場
Transcriptions
Standard Mandarin
- Hanyu Pinyin: Xī'ān Xīguān Jīchǎng

Xi'an Xiguan Airport (IATA: SIA, ICAO: ZLSN) was an airport that served Xi'an, capital of Northwest China's Shaanxi province. It was the city's main airport until it was replaced by the newly opened Xi'an Xianyang International Airport on 1 September 1991.

== History ==
The Xi'an Xiguan Airfield was built in 1924 under the directives of Zhang Xueliang of the Fengtian Army, and as the Chinese warlord battles raged, Feng Yuxiang and Yan Xishan sought to subjugate the Nationalist government of Generalissimo Chiang Kai-shek; the Young Marshall however sided with the Nationalists, and the Nationalist Chinese Air Force units began their stationing at Xi'an Xiguan Airfield, specifically the 6th Reconnaissance-Attack/Scout-Attack Group composed of O2U-1 light-attack/scout-bombers in 1929–30, which were deployed in the Central Plains War. During the War of Resistance-World War II, the airport was known as Hsian Airfield and was used by the United States Army Air Forces Fourteenth Air Force as part of the China Defensive Campaign (1942–1945). The Americans used the airport primarily as a photo-reconnaissance airfield, with unarmed P-38 Lightnings, equipped with aerial cameras flew over Japanese-held territory providing intelligence to the Chinese ground forces. In addition, P-61 Black Widow night interceptor aircraft flew from the airport, providing defense against night bombing raids by the Japanese, along with P-47 Thunderbolts day fighters and C-47 Skytrain transports flying in supplies and ammunition to support friendly forces in the area. The Americans closed their facilities at the airport after the end of the war in September 1945.

By the 1980s, the airport was too small to handle rapid increase of local and foreign tourists and the terminal grew inadequate and the airport could no longer expand. On September 1, 1991, the airport was closed and all the flights and vehicles left at the airport were transferred to the new Xianyang Airport. The site of the airport was then converted into a civil park.

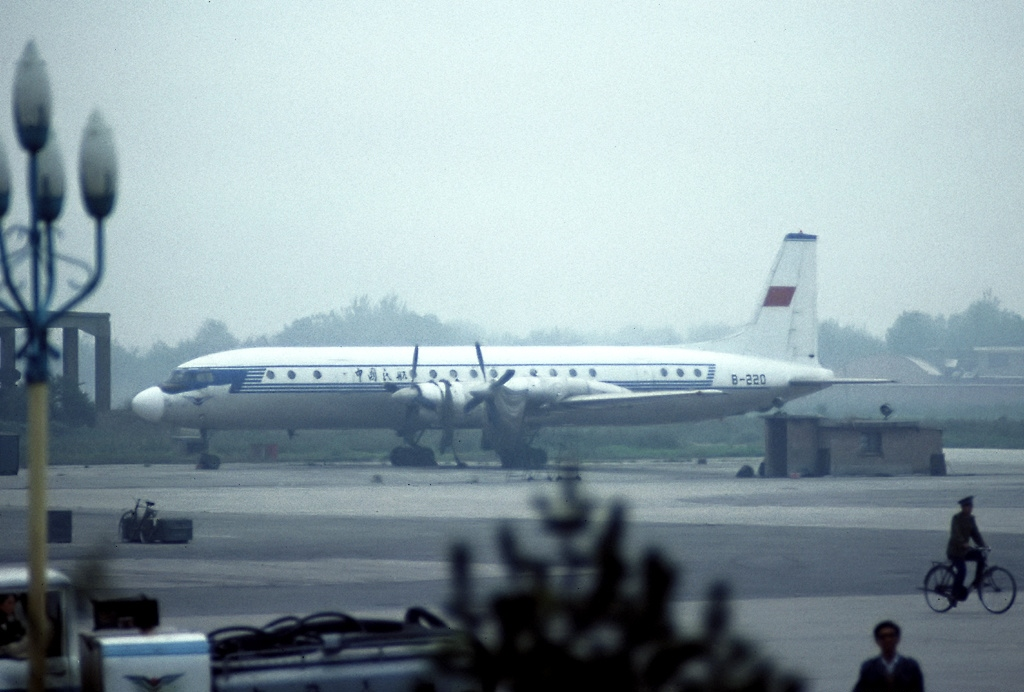
An Ilyushin Il-18 at the tarmac in 1988. At that time, bicycles patrolling the airport apron was still a norm.

== Former airlines and destinations ==
Some Airlines operated in Xi'an Xiguan Airport in the 1970s and 1980s, particularly Chinese airlines, such as CAAC. Before 1991, it was also a hub for China Northwest Airlines.

| Airlines | Destinations |
|---|---|
| CAAC Airlines | Ankang, Beijing-Capital, Chengdu, Chongqing/Baishiyi, Chongqing/Jiangbei, Guangzhou, Guilin/Qifengling, Hong Kong/Kai Tak, Kunming/Wujiaba, Lanzhou/Gongxingdun, Lanzhou/Zhongchuan, Shanghai/Longhua, Shanghai/Jiangwan, Shanghai/Hongqiao, Taiyuan, Ürümqi, Wuhan/Wangjiadun, Wuhan/Nanhu, Zhengzhou/Dongjiao |
| C.N.A.C | Beijing/Nanyuan, Canton, Chongqing/Baishiyi, Guilin, Nanjing/Dajiaochang, Shanghai/Longhua |
| Central Air Transport | Beijing/Nanyuan, Canton, Chengdu, Chongqing, Guilin, Hankou, Hangzhou, Hong Kong, Kunming, Nanjing, Shanghai/Longhua, Tianjin |
| Civil Air Transport (before 1949) | Beijing/Nanyuan, Canton, Chengdu, Chongqing, Guilin, Hankou, Hangzhou, Hong Kong, Kunming, Nanjing, Qingdao, Shanghai/Longhua, Tianjin |
| China Northwest Airlines | Beijing-Capital, Chengdu, Chongqing/Baishiyi, Chongqing/Jiangbei, Guangzhou, Guilin/Qifengling, Haikou/Daiyangshan, Hong Kong/Kai Tak, Kunming, Lanzhou, Nagoya-Komaki, Shanghai/Hongqiao, Taiyuan, Tokyo/Narita, Ürümqi, Wuhan (Nanhu), Yinchuan |
| China Southwest Airlines | Chengdu, Chongqing/Baishiyi, Chongqing/Jiangbei |
| China Xinjiang Airlines | Beijing-Capital, Chengdu, Guangzhou, Guilin/Qifengling, Kunming, Ürümqi, Zhengzhou/Dongjiao |
| Dragonair | Hong Kong/Kai Tak |

== See also ==
- List of airports in China
- List of defunct international airports
