= China Southwest Airlines =

Airline of China (1987–2002)

China Southwest Airlines 中国西南航空公司

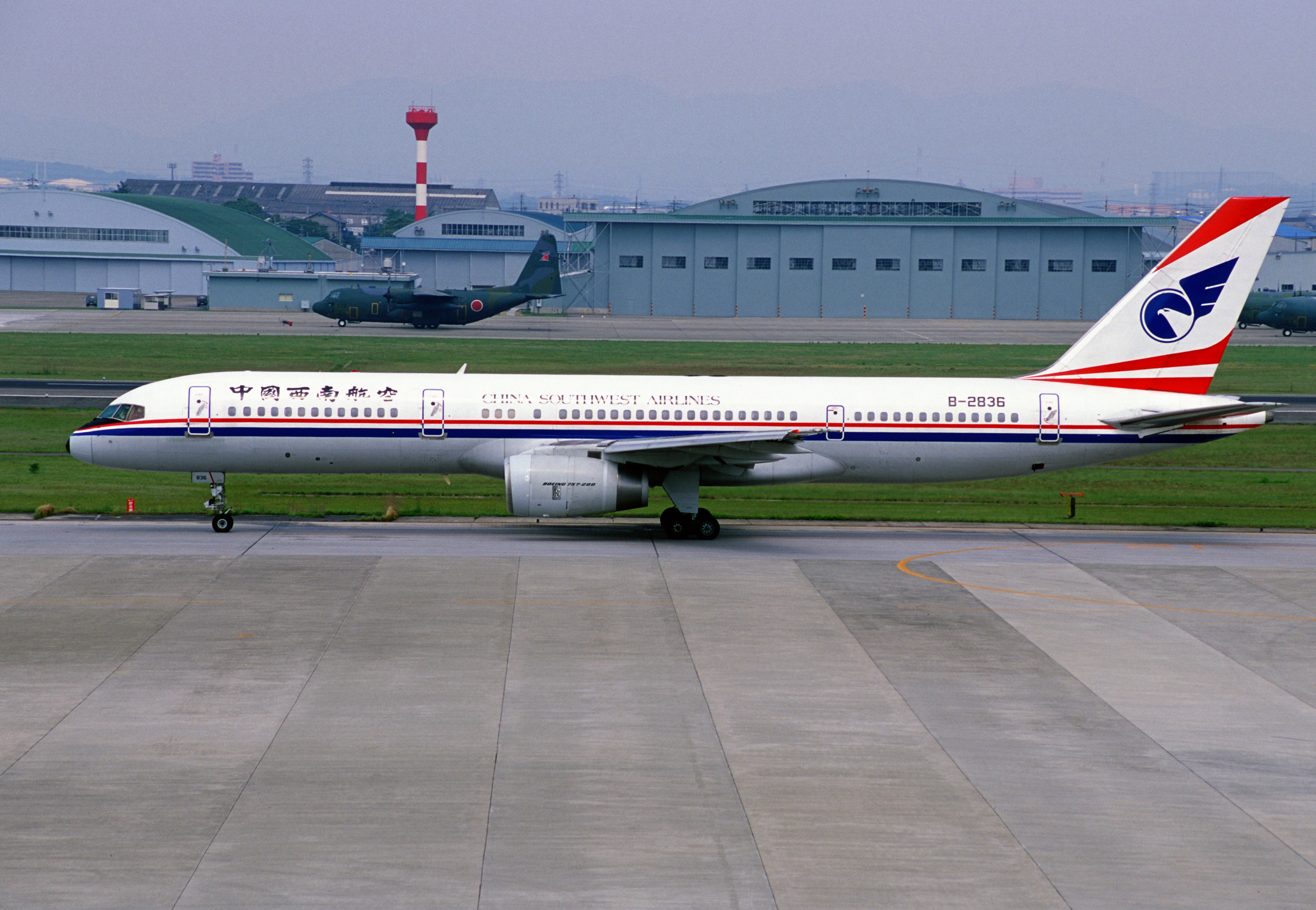
- China Southwest Airlines Boeing 757-200 in 1995
| IATA | ICAO | Call sign |
|---|---|---|
| SZ | CXN | CHINA SOUTHWEST |
- Founded: 15 October 1987
- Ceased operations: 28 October 2002 (merged into Air China)
- Hubs: Chengdu Shuangliu International Airport
- Secondary hubs: Chongqing Jiangbei International Airport
- Fleet size: 40
- Destinations: 60+
- Headquarters: Shuangliu, Chengdu, Sichuan, China
- Key people: Zhou Zhengquan (president); Song X Jie (Vice president)
- Employees: 8,603 (2000)

China Southwest Airlines
- Simplified Chinese: 中国西南航空公司
- Traditional Chinese: 中國西南航空公司
Transcriptions
Standard Mandarin
- Hanyu Pinyin: Zhōngguó xīnán hángkōng gōngsī

China Southwest Airlines (中国西南航空公司) was a civil airline headquartered in Shuangliu, Chengdu, Sichuan, China, from 1987 to 2002. It was merged into Air China in October 2002.

== History ==
China Southwest Airlines was established on 15 October 1987. The airline joined the International Air Transport Association in April 1996, and then the Multilateral & Bilateral Interline Traffic Agreements in March 1997. In 2000, the airline had carried 50.5 million passengers as well as 130 tonnes of cargo. On 28 October 2002, the airline merged into Air China.

== Destinations ==
China Southwest Airlines' main hub was at Chengdu Shuangliu International Airport and its secondary hub was in Chongqing Jiangbei International Airport. It was the only airline flying to Lhasa Gonggar Airport until 2002. Although most routes from its hubs Chengdu and Chongqing were domestic, it also flew to Bangkok, Chiang Mai, Kathmandu, Kuala Lumpur, Singapore, Osaka and Seoul.

The following is a incomplete list of destinations served by China Southwest Airlines:

| Country | City | Airport | Notes |
|---|---|---|---|
| China | Beihai | Beihai Fucheng Airport | |
| China | Beijing | Beijing Capital International Airport | |
| China | Changchun | Changchun Dafangshen Airport | |
| China | Changsha | Changsha Huanghua International Airport | |
| China | Chengdu | Chengdu Shuangliu International Airport | Hub |
| China | Chongqing | Chongqing Jiangbei International Airport | Hub |
| China | Chongqing | Wanzhou Wuqiao Airport | |
| China | Dalian | Dalian Zhoushuizi International Airport | |
| China | Fuzhou | Fuzhou Changle International Airport | |
| China | Fuzhou | Fuzhou Yixu Airport | Airport closed |
| China | Guangzhou | Guangzhou Baiyun International Airport | |
| China | Guilin | Guilin Liangjiang International Airport | |
| China | Guilin | Guilin Qifengling Airport | Airport closed |
| China | Guiyang | Guiyang Longdongbao International Airport | |
| China | Haikou | Haikou Dayingshan Airport | Airport closed |
| China | Haikou | Haikou Meilan International Airport | |
| China | Hangzhou | Hangzhou Jianqiao Airport | |
| China | Hangzhou | Hangzhou Xiaoshan International Airport | |
| China | Harbin | Harbin Taiping International Airport | |
| China | Hefei | Hefei Luogang Airport | |
| China | Hong Kong | Hong Kong International Airport | |
| China | Hong Kong | Kai Tak Airport | Airport closed |
| China | Huangshan | Huangshan Tunxi International Airport | |
| China | Jinan | Jinan Yaoqiang International Airport | |
| China | Jinan | Jinan Zhangzhuang Airport | Airport closed |
| China | Jiujiang | Jiujiang Lushan Airport | |
| China | Kunming | Kunming Wujiaba International Airport | |
| China | Lanzhou | Lanzhou Zhongchuan International Airport | |
| China | Lhasa | Lhasa Gonggar International Airport | |
| China | Linyi | Linyi Shubuling Airport | |
| China | Luoyang | Luoyang Beijiao Airport | |
| China | Luzhou | Luzhou Lantian Airport | |
| China | Macau | Macau International Airport | |
| China | Mudanjiang | Mudanjiang Hailang International Airport | |
| China | Nanchang | Nanchang Changbei International Airport | |
| China | Nanchang | Nanchang Xiangtang Airport | Airport closed |
| China | Nanjing | Nanjing Dajiaochang Airport | Airport closed |
| China | Nanjing | Nanjing Lukou International Airport | |
| China | Nanning | Nanning Wuxu International Airport | |
| China | Nantong | Nantong Xingdong International Airport | |
| China | Ningbo | Ningbo Lishe International Airport | |
| China | Qamdo | Qamdo Bamda Airport | |
| China | Qingdao | Qingdao Liuting International Airport | |
| China | Sanya | Sanya Phoenix International Airport | |
| China | Shanghai | Shanghai Hongqiao International Airport | |
| China | Shanghai | Shanghai Pudong International Airport | |
| China | Shantou | Shantou Waisha Airport | |
| China | Shenyang | Shenyang Taoxian International Airport | |
| China | Shenzhen | Shenzhen Bao'an International Airport | |
| China | Shijiazhuang | Shijiazhuang Zhengding International Airport | |
| China | Ürümqi | Ürümqi Tianshan International Airport | |
| China | Wenzhou | Wenzhou Longwan International Airport | |
| China | Wuhan | Wuhan Tianhe International Airport | |
| China | Wuhan | Wuhan Wangjiadun Airport | Airport closed |
| China | Xi'an | Xi'an Xianyang International Airport | |
| China | Xi'an | Xi'an Xiguan Airport | Airport closed |
| China | Xiamen | Xiamen Gaoqi International Airport | |
| China | Xichang | Xichang Qingshan Airport | |
| China | Xining | Xining Caojiapu International Airport | |
| China | Xining | Xining Lejiawan Airport | Airport closed |
| China | Xuzhou | Xuzhou Guanyin International Airport | |
| China | Yantai | Yantai Laishan Airport | |
| China | Yibin | Yibin Caiba Airport | |
| China | Yichang | Yichang Sanxia International Airport | |
| China | Zhangjiajie | Zhangjiajie Hehua International Airport | |
| China | Zhanjiang | Zhanjiang Airport | |
| China | Zhengzhou | Zhengzhou Dongjiao Airport | Airport closed |
| China | Zhengzhou | Zhengzhou Xinzheng International Airport | |
| China | Zhuhai | Zhuhai Jinwan Airport | |
| Japan | Nagoya | Komaki Airport | |
| Japan | Osaka | Itami Airport | |
| Japan | Osaka | Kansai International Airport | |
| Malaysia | Kuala Lumpur | Kuala Lumpur International Airport | |
| Malaysia | Kuala Lumpur | Subang International Airport | |
| Nepal | Kathmandu | Tribhuvan International Airport | |
| Singapore | Singapore | Changi Airport | |
| South Korea | Seoul | Gimpo International Airport | |
| South Korea | Seoul | Incheon International Airport | |
| Thailand | Bangkok | Don Mueang International Airport | |
| Thailand | Chiang Mai | Chiang Mai International Airport | |

== Fleet ==
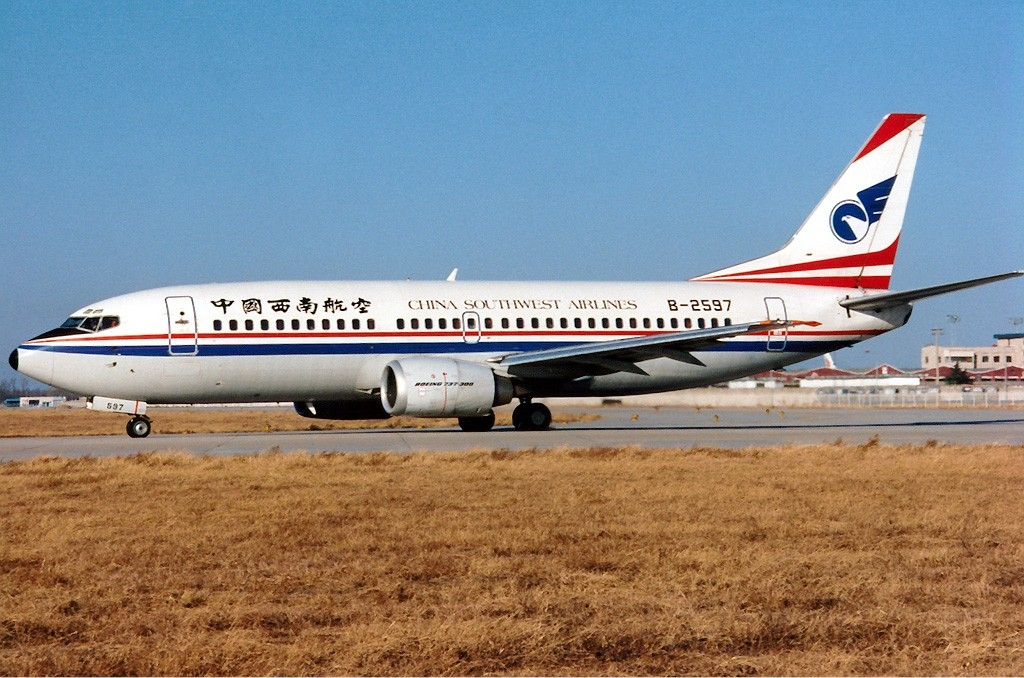
China Southwest Airlines Boeing 737-300 in 1995

=== Final fleet ===
At the time of merger, China Southwest Airlines fleet consisted of:

| Aircraft | In service | Orders | Notes |
|---|---|---|---|
| Airbus A340-300 | 3 | — | |
| Boeing 737-300 | 14 | — | |
| Boeing 737-600 | 4 | — | |
| Boeing 737-800 | 6 | — | |
| Boeing 757-200 | 13 | — | |
| Total | 40 | — | |

=== Fleet history ===
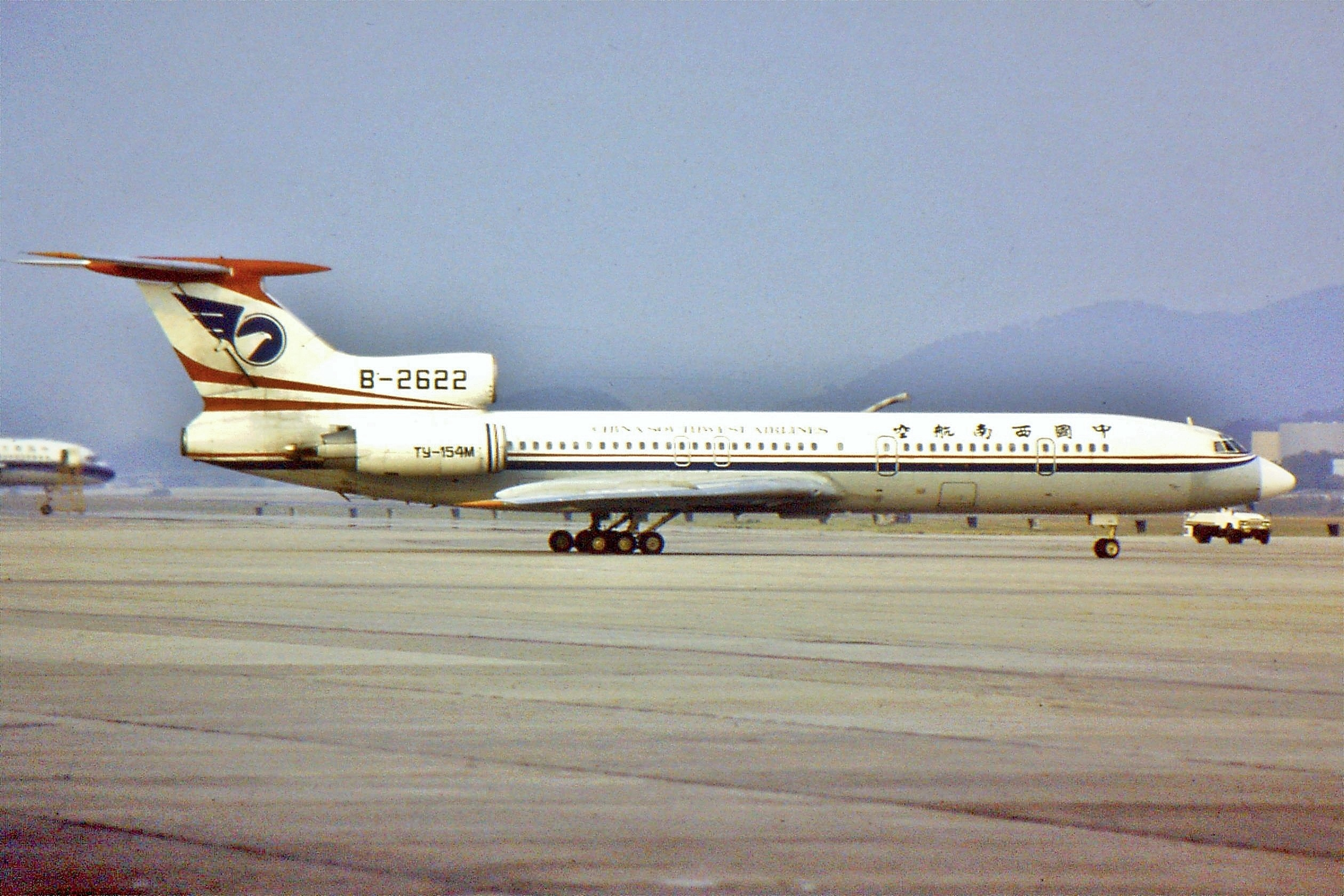
China Southwest Airlines Tupolev Tu-154M in 1994, this exact plane later crashed as China Southwest Airlines Flight 4509.

China Southwest Airlines operated a fleet of Boeing 737-300, Boeing 737-600, Boeing 737-800, Boeing 757-200 and Airbus A340-300 aircraft. It had formerly operated other aircraft, including the Ilyushin Il-18D, the Tupolev Tu-154, and the Boeing 707. Throughout the airline's history, the airline had operated:

| Aircraft | Total | Introduced | Retired | Notes |
|---|---|---|---|---|
| Airbus A340-300 | 5 | 1998 | 2002 | |
| Antonov An-24V | 2 | 1988 | Unknown | |
| Boeing 707-320B | 3 | 1987 | 1995 | |
| Boeing 707-320C | 2 | 1987 | 1998 | |
| Boeing 737-200 | 5 | 1987 | 1991 | |
| Boeing 737-300 | 24 | 1987 | 2002 | |
| Boeing 737-500 | 1 | 1993 | 2002 | |
| Boeing 737-600 | 4 | 2001 | 2002 | |
| Boeing 737-800 | 6 | 1999 | 2002 | |
| Boeing 757-200 | 16 | 1987 | 2002 | |
| Harbin Y-12 | 2 | Unknown | Unknown | |
| Tupolev Tu-154M | 5 | 1988 | 1999 | |
| Yunshuji Y-7-100 | 4 | 1987 | Unknown | |

== Incidents and accidents ==
- On January 18, 1988, China Southwest Airlines Flight 4146, an Ilyushin 18D crashed while on approach to Chongqing Baishiyi Airport. All 108 people on board were killed.
- On October 2, 1990, a hijacked Xiamen Airlines plane (operated as Xiamen Airlines Flight 8301) sideswiped a China Southwest Airlines Boeing 707 (operated as China Southwest Airlines Flight 4305) before crashing into a third airliner. Nobody on the 707 died.
- On February 24, 1999, Flight 4509, a Tupolev Tu-154 crashed into a field while on approach to Wenzhou Airport, killing all 61 passengers and crew members on board, and leading to the withdrawal of all of China Southwest's Tu-154 fleet.

== See also ==
- Aviation industry in the People's Republic of China
