= China Southwest Airlines Flight 4146 =

1988 aviation accident

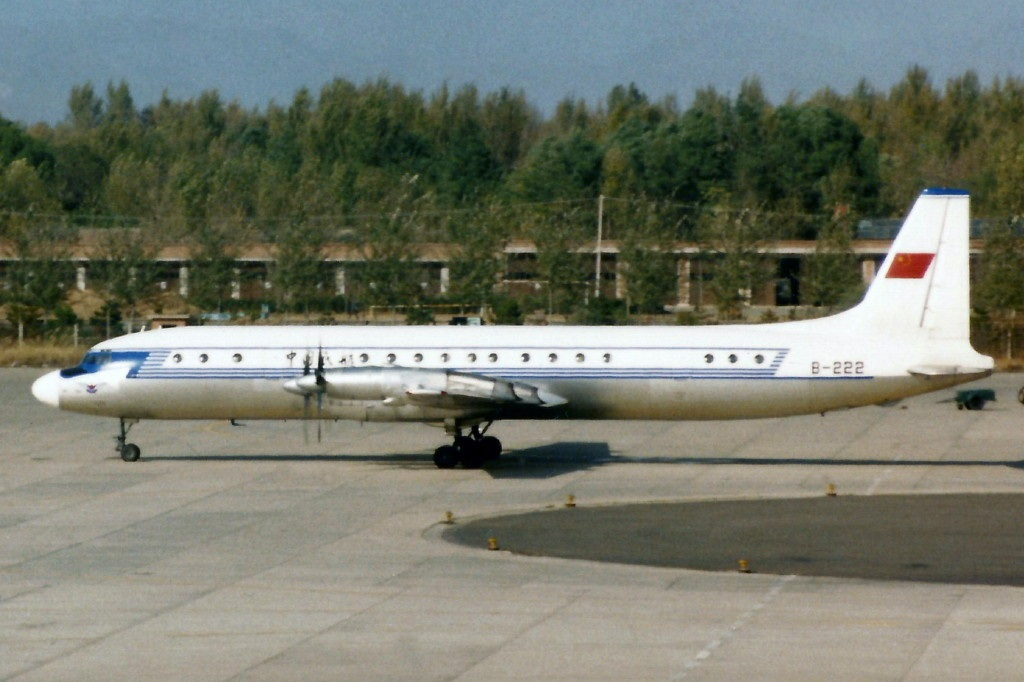
- B-222, the aircraft involved, in CAAC livery in 1986

Accident
- Date: 18 January 1988
- Summary: In-flight fire causing structural failure and loss of control due to poor maintenance
- Site: 5km NW from Chongqing Baishiyi Airport, near Longfengxinmin Village, Chongqing, China; 29°31′25″N 106°20′00″E

Aircraft
- Aircraft type: Ilyushin Il-18D
- Operator: China Southwest Airlines
- Registration: B-222
- Flight origin: Beijing Capital International Airport
- Destination: Chongqing Baishiyi Airport
- Occupants: 108
- Passengers: 98
- Crew: 10
- Fatalities: 108
- Survivors: 0

China Southwest Airlines Flight 4146 was a domestic flight from Beijing Capital International Airport to Chongqing Baishiyi Airport. On 18 January 1988, an Ilyushin Il-18 flying the route crashed near Longfengxinmin Village, Chongqing, China, with the loss of all 108 passengers and crew. The crash was caused by poor maintenance.

== Flight ==
Flight 4146 was a scheduled domestic passenger flight from Beijing Capital International Airport, Beijing to Chongqing Airport, Chongqing, with 98 passengers and a crew of ten on board. The en route flight was uneventful until 21:50, but when the aircraft had neared Chongqing, the aircraft's Number Four engine (the outer engine on the right wing) caught fire. The fire burned the engine mount and the engine fell off the aircraft's wing. This caused a loss of control. Flight 4146 hit a power line and two farmhouses before bursting into flames. Everyone on board the Ilyushin Il-18 perished in the crash. The occupants consisted of 104 Chinese, three Japanese, and one Briton.

The engine fire was the result of an oil leak. The engine was shut down and its propeller feathered due to severe vibrations. However, the starter/generator fitted to the engine had overheated to such an extent that it had burnt the tube supplying oil at high pressure to feather the propeller. When the crew feathered the propeller, the tube burst and the leaking oil caught fire.

== Aftermath and cause ==
Not long after the crash of Flight 4146, the Civil Aviation Administration of China ordered safety checks that found mechanical problems leading to the grounding of at least 17 aircraft.

The crash of Flight 4146 was blamed on poor maintenance.

== See also ==
- China Southwest Airlines Flight 4509, another aviation disaster caused by poor maintenance.
- Nigeria Airways Flight 2120, another in flight fire that started when improperly maintained tires burst and caught fire on takeoff, killing 261 people.
