= China Southwest Airlines Flight 4509 =

1999 airplane crash in China

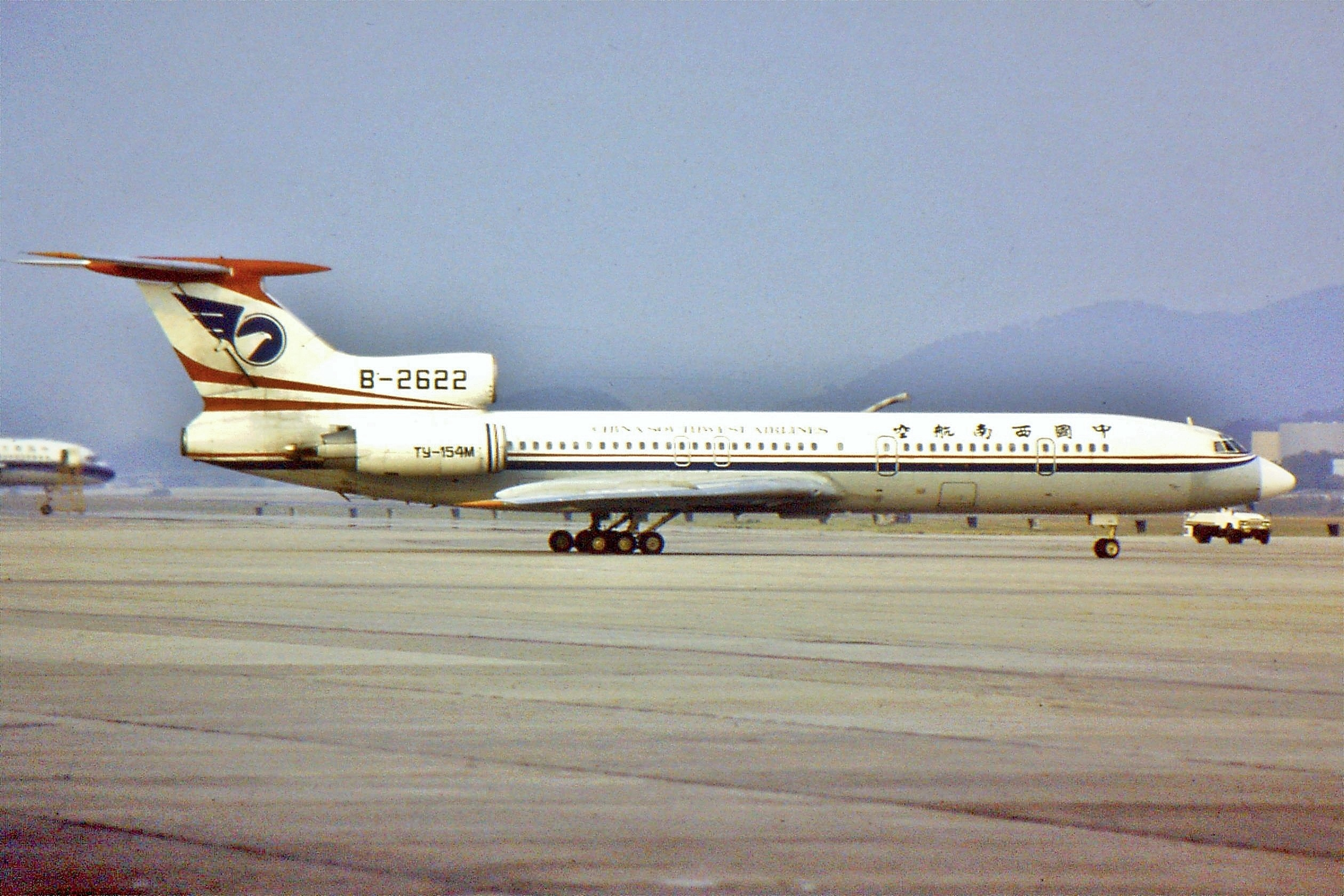
- B-2622, the aircraft involved in the accident

Accident
- Date: February 24, 1999
- Summary: Improper maintenance, loss of control
- Site: Rui'an, Zhejiang, China; 27°43′10.2″N 120°39′27.2″E
- Total injuries: 7

Aircraft
- Aircraft type: Tupolev Tu-154M
- Operator: China Southwest Airlines
- Registration: B-2622
- Flight origin: Chengdu Shuangliu International Airport, Sichuan
- Destination: Wenzhou Yongqiang Airport, Wenzhou, Zhejiang
- Occupants: 61
- Passengers: 50
- Crew: 11
- Fatalities: 61
- Survivors: 0

Ground casualties
- Ground injuries: 7

China Southwest Airlines Flight 4509 (SZ4509) was a domestic flight in China from Chengdu Shuangliu International Airport, Sichuan to Wenzhou Yongqiang Airport, Zhejiang. On February 24, 1999, the Tupolev Tu-154M operating the flight crashed while on approach to Wenzhou Airport, killing all 61 passengers and crew members on board.

== Aircraft and crew ==
The aircraft was a 1990-built Tupolev Tu-154M (serial number 90A-846, serial 0846) airliner powered by three Soloviev D-30 turbofan engines from UEC Saturn. It was initially registered in the Soviet Union with test registration CCCP-85846. It was delivered to the Civil Aviation Administration of China (CAAC) in April the same year, and was registered as B-2622.

The flight crew consisted of captain Yao Fuchen (Chinese: 姚福臣), age 37, first officer Xue Mao (薛冒), 28, navigator Lan Zhangfeng (郎占锋), 46, and flight engineer Guo Shuming (郭树铭), 49. There were also seven flight attendants on board.

== Accident ==
On 24 February 1999, the crew was preparing the aircraft for landing at Wenzhou Airport. The flaps were extended at 1,000 metres (3,300 ft), but seconds after, the aircraft's nose lowered abruptly, the aircraft disintegrated in mid-air and crashed into an area of high ground, and exploded. Witnesses saw the plane nose dive into the ground from an altitude of 700 metres (2,300 ft) and explode. All 61 people on board were killed. Several people on the ground were injured from debris.

== Cause ==
Incorrect self-locking locknuts had been installed in the elevator operating system, which maintenance crews failed to notice. These spun off during the flight, leaving the elevator uncontrollable. This disabled the aircraft's pitch channel, causing the crash.

== Aftermath ==
This and the China Northwest Airlines Flight 2303 disaster contributed to the decision to remove all Tupolev Tu-154 aircraft in China from service on October 30, 2002.

== See also ==
- Alaska Airlines Flight 261
- China Northwest Airlines Flight 2303
- China Southwest Airlines Flight 4146
- Japan Airlines Flight 123
- Emery Worldwide Airlines Flight 17, a crash where a maintenance error led to an elevator jam and loss of pitch control.
- Continental Express Flight 2574, an accident where a deicing boot detached from an elevator due to faulty maintenance, leading to a catastrophic loss of control.
