= CAAC Flight 301 =

1988 aviation accident

Coordinates: 22.3287°N 114.1944°E

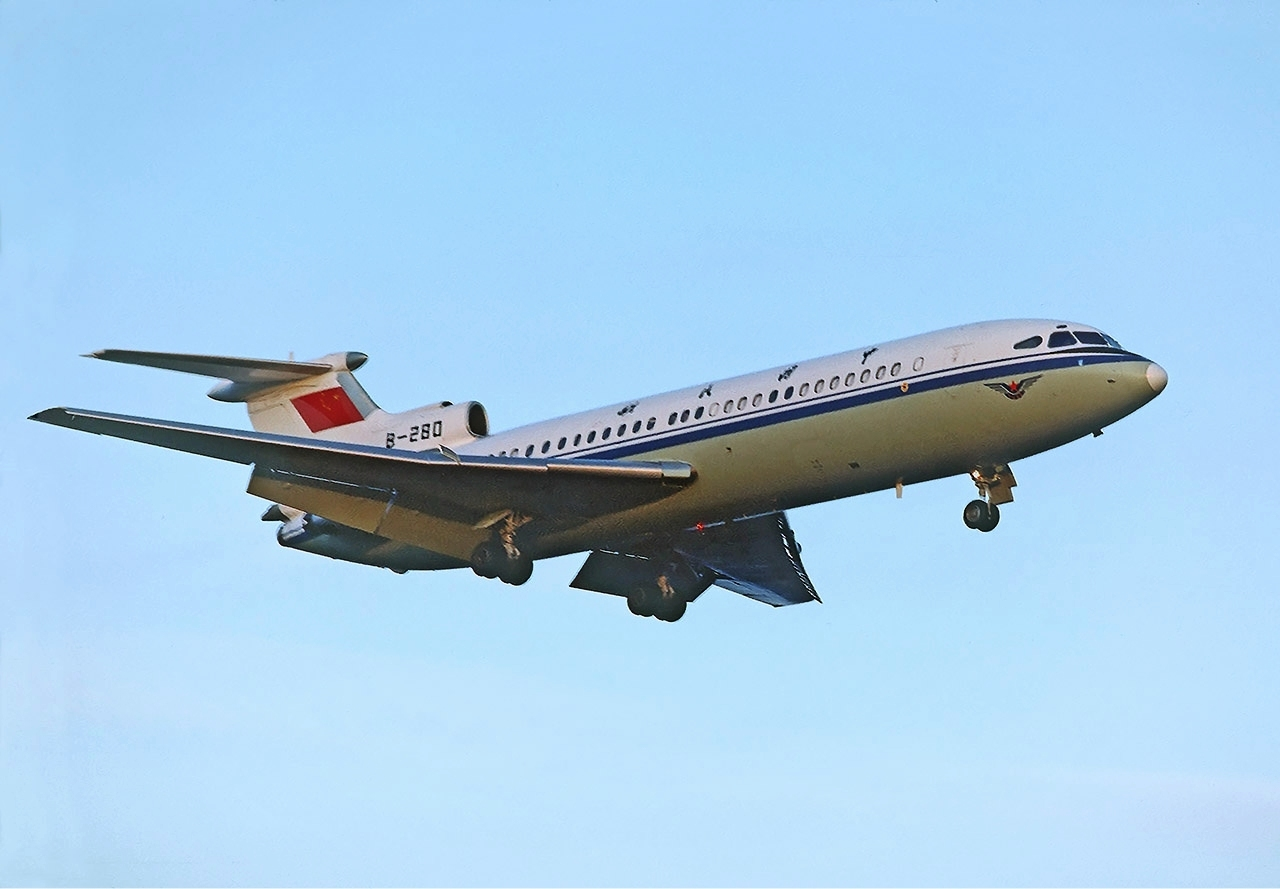
- B-280, a CAAC Trident sister ship of the accident aircraft.

Accident
- Date: 31 August 1988
- Summary: Pilot error and bad weather
- Site: Kowloon Bay near Kai Tak Airport, Hong Kong

Aircraft
- Aircraft type: Hawker Siddeley Trident 2E
- Operator: CAAC
- Registration: B-2218
- Flight origin: Guangzhou Baiyun International Airport (former)
- Destination: Hong Kong Kai Tak Airport
- Occupants: 89
- Passengers: 78
- Crew: 11
- Fatalities: 7
- Injuries: 15
- Survivors: 82

Seating map

CAAC Flight 301, a Hawker Siddeley Trident operated by CAAC Guangzhou Regional Administration from Guangzhou Baiyun to Hong Kong Kai Tak, ran off the runway in Hong Kong on 31 August 1988 after clipping approach lights. Six crew members and one passenger perished in the accident. The crash shut down Kai Tak Airport for more than six hours after the accident.

== Aircraft ==
The aircraft involved was a British-built Hawker Siddeley Trident 2E, powered by three Rolls-Royce Spey 512-5W, The first flight was in 1973. Total airframe hours were 14,332, C/n /msn 2159. Registration was B-2218.

== Accident sequence ==
While on final approach to Kai Tak Airport, in rain with 450 metres (1,480 ft) visibility, the right wing of the Hawker Siddeley Trident operating the flight clipped approach lights of Runway 31 and the main landing gear tyres hit the runway promontory, causing the right main landing gear to be ripped from the wing. The aircraft then became airborne and impacted the runway 600 metres (2,000 ft) further on. The aircraft then veered off the runway to the right and diagonally crossed the grassed runway strip surrounding it. The nose and left main landing gear then collapsed and the aircraft slid over the parallel taxiway and into Kowloon Bay.

The cockpit was cut off and the rest of the aircraft was intact. Attempts were made by divers to get to the cockpit where the flight crew were stationed but were unsuccessful, the cockpit crew were injured by the impact but autopsies showed that the cause of death was from drowning.

== Passengers ==
Of the 89 occupants of the aircraft, seven died and an additional 15 received injuries. Of the dead, six were crew members and one was a Hong Kong passenger who succumbed to his injuries in a hospital. The dead crew members were in the front of the aircraft. Three crew members, all Chinese, received injuries and survived. Of the 12 American passengers, two received injuries. Seven Hong Kong passengers, two Taiwanese passengers, and one Frenchman received injuries. One injured passenger was a Chinese-American.

== Investigation ==
The report noted "There was insufficient evidence to determine the cause of the accident." The report concludes that the final approach became unstable, and that windshear may have been a contributory factor. The final deviation below the normal approach path was probably due to a sudden reduction and distortion of the visual reference caused by heavy rain.

The report further noted that:

- "The accident was survivable."
- "The flight deck crew were not wearing shoulder harness." [sic]
- "A sixth crew member in the flight compartment sat on a small metal stool that was not secured in any way,[...]"
- "There were no passenger safety leaflets on the aircraft,[...]"
- "'One cabin attendant did not fasten her seat belt for landing."
- "The approach and departure paths at HKIA are substantially over water but no passenger lifejackets were carried on the aircraft."

== See also ==
Delta Air Lines Flight 1141 Another crash that occurred later on the same day, also slid off the runway. Technically, it was still 30 August in Texas when the CAAC crash occurred, but it was the 31st in Hong Kong.
