= Hefei Luogang International Airport =

Former airport of Hefei, Anhui, China (1977–2013)

Hefei International Luogang Airport
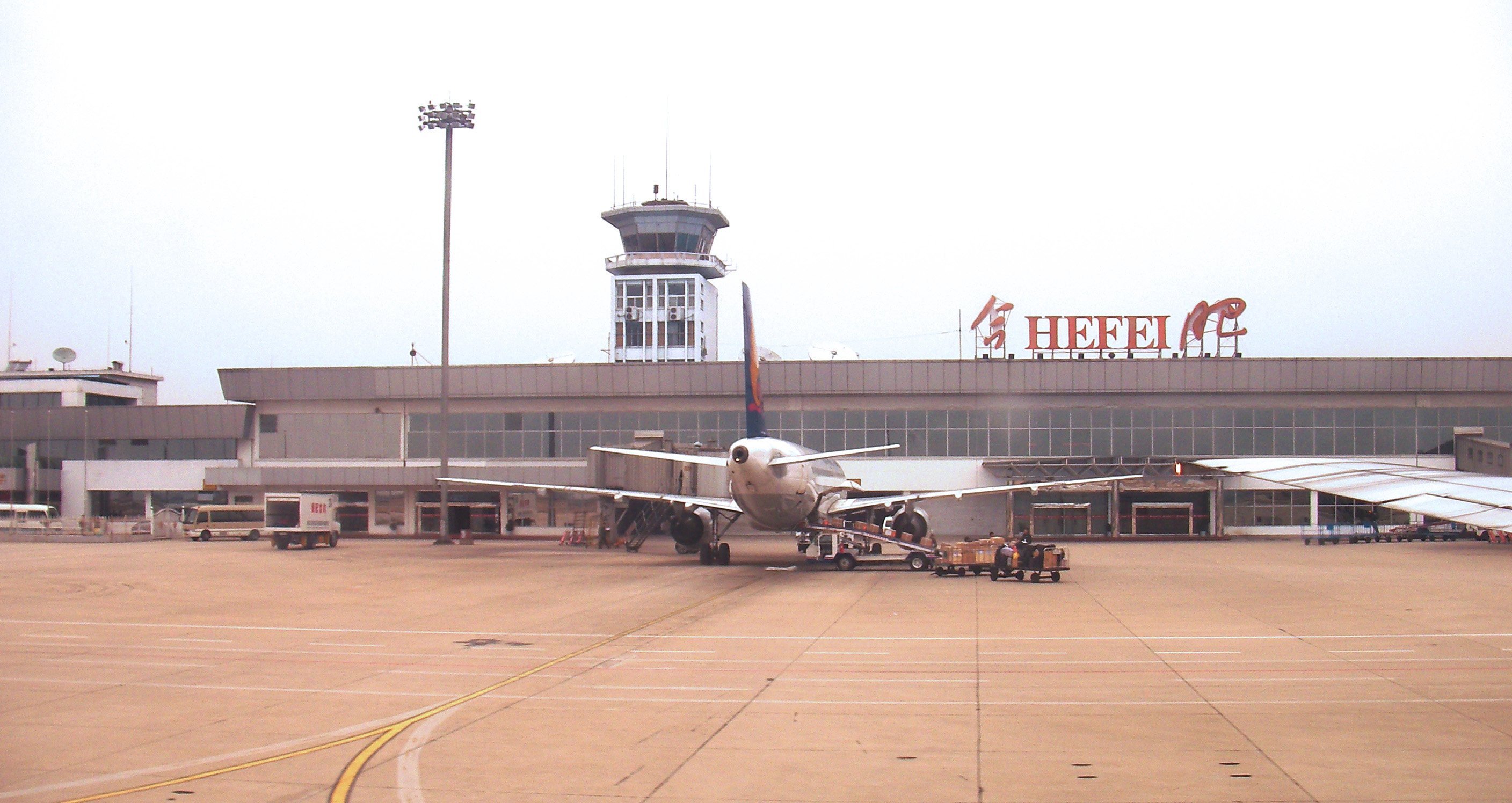
- Hefei Luogang International Airport
- IATA: HFE; ICAO: ZSOF

Summary
- Airport type: Defunct
- Location: Baohe District, Hefei, Anhui, China
- Opened: November 1977
- Closed: 29 May 2013
- Elevation AMSL: 33 m (108 ft)
- Coordinates: 31°46′48″N 117°17′54″E

Map
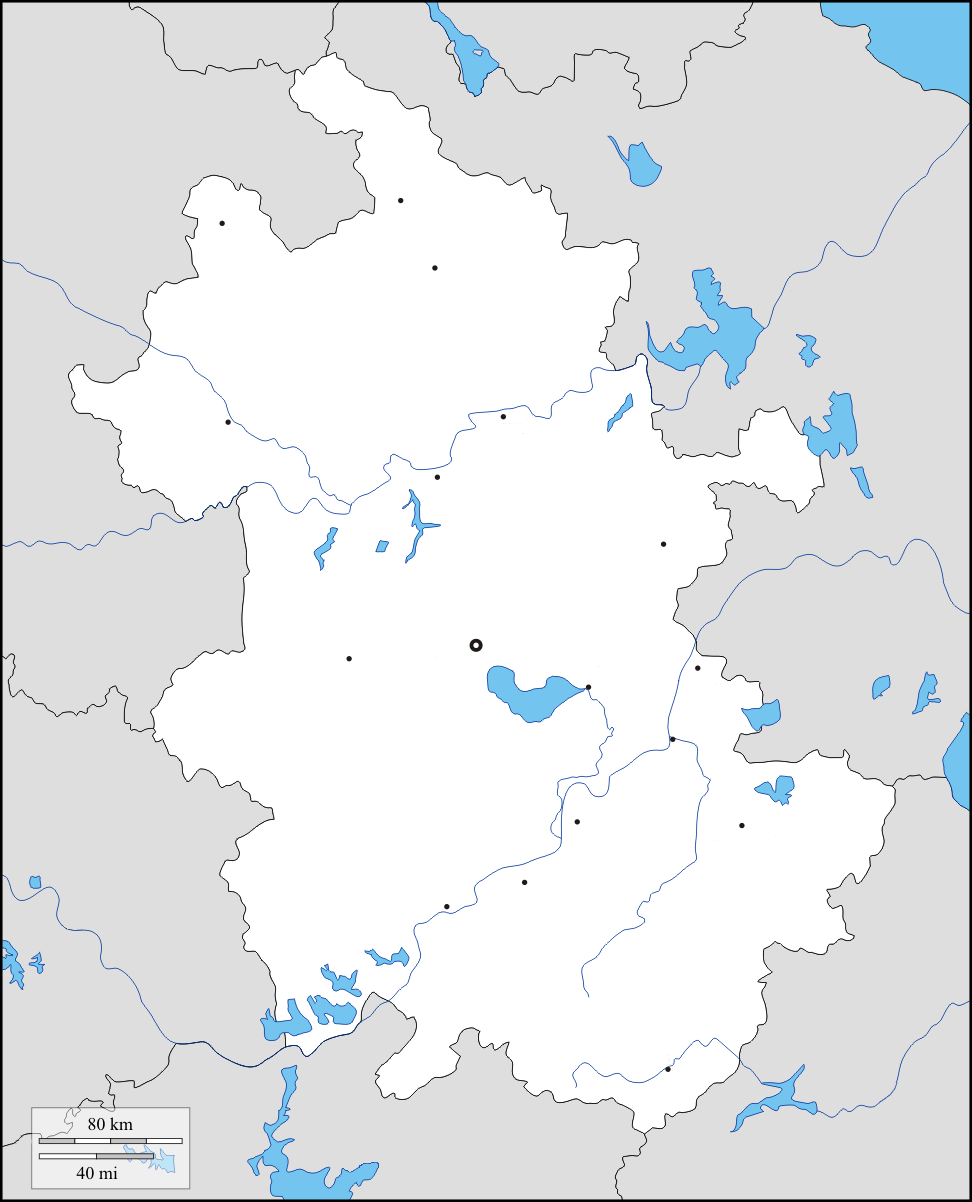
- Location in Anhui Luogang (Anhui)

Runways
Direction	Length		Surface
Direction	m	ft	Surface
14/32 (closed)	3,000	9,843	Concrete

Statistics (2011)
- Passengers: 4,398,739
- Source: List of the busiest airports in China

Hefei Luogang International Airport (IATA: HFE, ICAO: ZSOF) was an airport that served Hefei, the capital of East China's Anhui province. Opened in November 1977, it served as the city's main airport until it was replaced by the newly opened Hefei Xinqiao International Airport on 29 May 2013. In the late-2010s, the airport was planned to be renamed Hefei Luogang General-Aviation Airport (合肥骆岗通用机场) to serve helicopters and other low-flying aircraft; however, that plan was eventually abandoned. In 2023, the area was re-developed into Luogang Park.

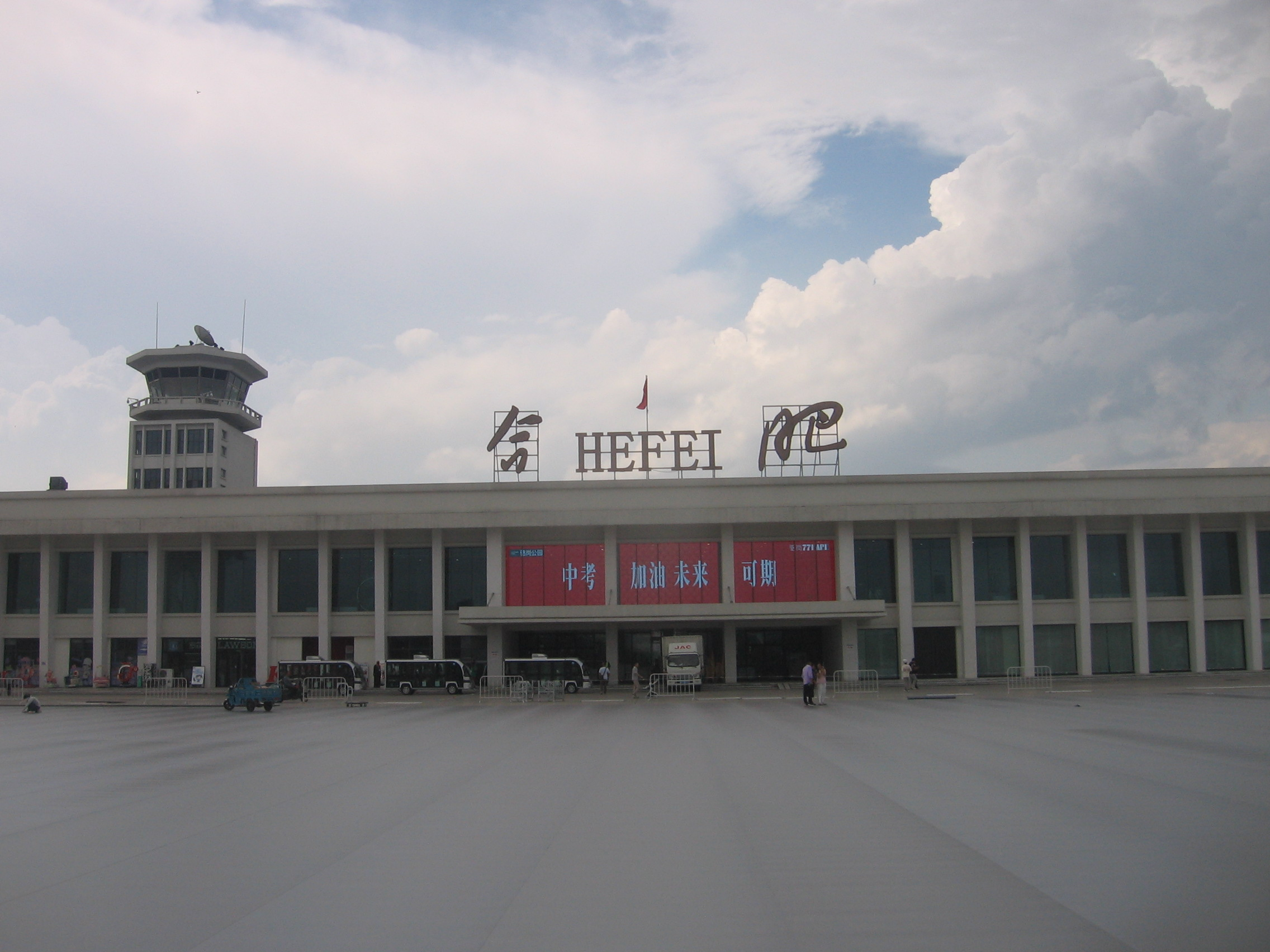
The original terminal of Hefei Luogang Airport has now turned into a City Construction Museum, as part of Luogang Park

== See also ==
- Hefei Xinqiao International Airport
- List of airports in China
- List of the busiest airports in China
