= Kunming Wujiaba International Airport =

Former airport of Kunming, Yunnan, China (1923–2012)

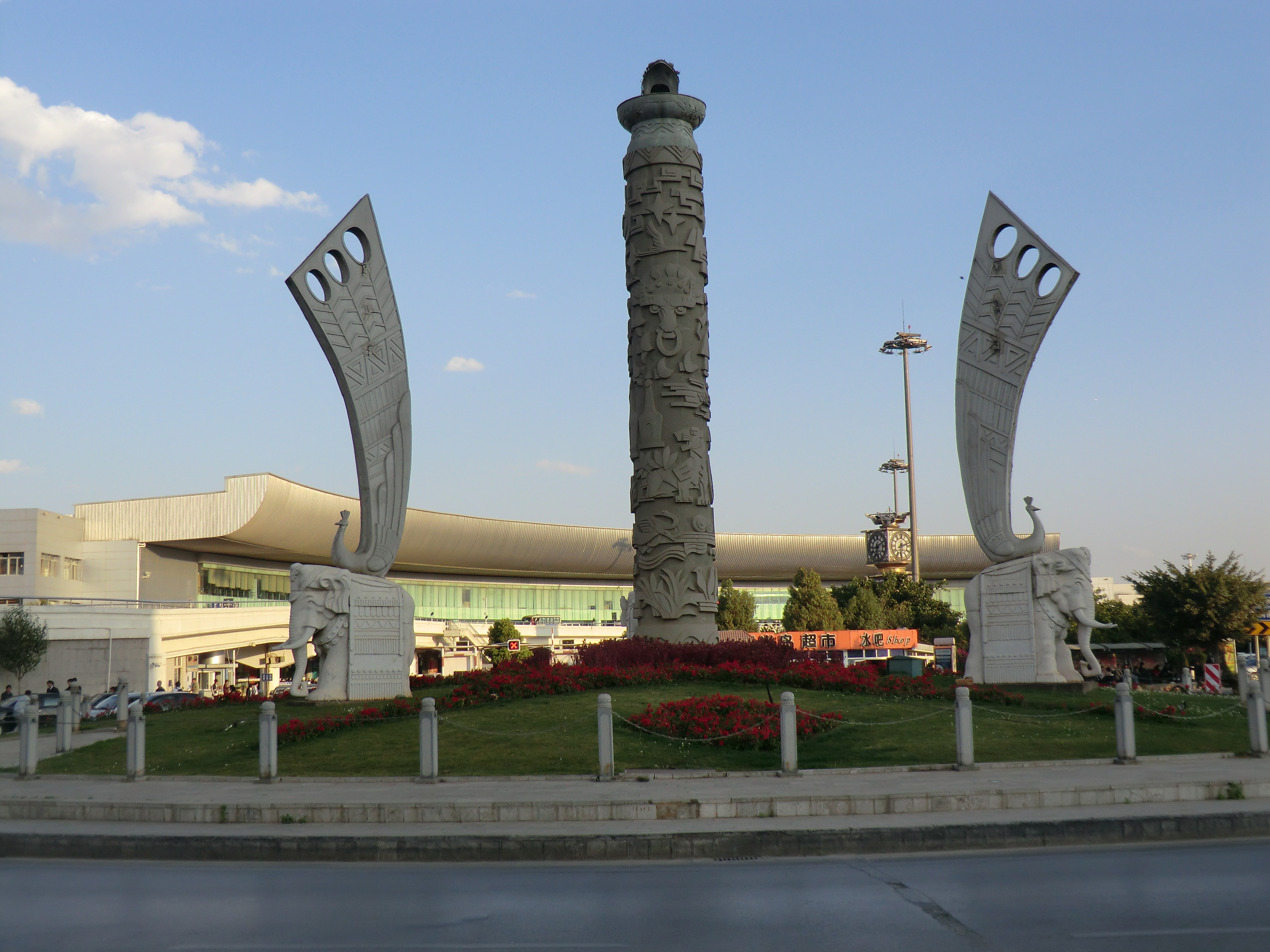
- IATA: KMG; ICAO: ZPPP

Summary
- Airport type: Defunct
- Location: Guandu, Kunming, Yunnan, China
- Opened: 1923
- Closed: 28 June 2012
- Hub for: China Yunnan Airlines (1992–2003); China Eastern Airlines (2003–2012); Kunming Airlines (2005–2012); Lucky Air (2005–2012)
- Elevation AMSL: 1,895 m / 6,217 ft
- Coordinates: 24°59′32″N 102°44′36″E

Map
- Location in Yunnan Location in China

Runways
Direction	Length		Surface
Direction	m	ft	Surface
03/21 (closed)	3,400	11,155	Concrete

Statistics (2011)
- Passengers: 22,270,130
- Source: List of the busiest airports in China

Kunming Wujiaba International Airport
- Traditional Chinese: 昆明巫家壩國際機場
- Simplified Chinese: 昆明巫家坝国际机场
Transcriptions
Standard Mandarin
- Hanyu Pinyin: Kūnmíng Wūjiābà Guójì Jīchǎng
- Wade–Giles: Kʻun^{1}-ming^{2} Wu^{1}-chia^{1}-pa^{4} Kuo^{2}-chi^{4} Chi^{1}-chʻang^{3}

Kunming Wujiaba International Airport (IATA: KMG, ICAO: ZPPP) was an airport that served Kunming, the capital of Southwestern China's Yunnan province. It is located 4 km (2.5 mi) south-east of metropolitan Kunming. Originally built in 1923, it was the city's main airport until it was replaced by the newly built Kunming Changshui International Airport on 28 June 2012. Wujiaba had been renovated numerous times into a modern facility throughout its operations. It was a major hub for China Eastern Airlines, Kunming Airlines, and Lucky Air. As of 2021, Wujiaba Airport has been demolished and the land will be fully redeveloped before the end of 2021.

== History ==
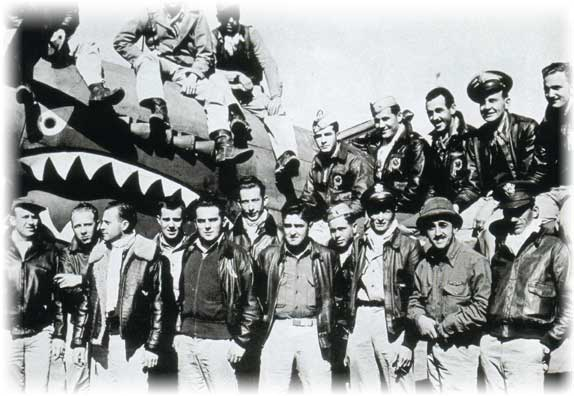
The "Flying Tigers", headquartered at Wujiaba Airport

Wujiaba is among the oldest airports in China, with a history that can be traced back to about 100 years, and was first established into a military airbase and flight-training institute under the supervision of local warlord General Tang Jiyao in 1922; an additional 23 airports would be established in Yunnan from 1922 to 1929.

The Sino-Japanese War was the beginning of World War II in Asia, and following the Battles of Shanghai and Nanjing, the Chinese Central Air Force Academy had to be relocated from Jianqiao Airbase to the expanded Wujiaba Airport. After a few years of support of the Chinese Air Force under the Sino-Soviet Cooperation in the War of Resistance against the Empire of Japan, the United States began to show earnest support for China's war effort with the oil embargo and asset freezing against Japan in 1941, and Wujiaba became the base for the "legendary Flying Tigers", the American Volunteer Group (AVG) of combat airmen serving in the Chinese Air Force, led by Claire Lee Chennault just before the United States entered the war. After the US entered the war in December 1941, and starting in 1942, Wujiaba Airport was the headquarters of numerous United States Army Air Forces units, including the Fourteenth Air Force and later the Tenth Air Force.

The USAAF Air Transport Command (ATC) established a major air transport facility at the airport, which connected flights west to Chabua Airfield, India, with other routes within China Jiangbei Airport (Chunking); Chengtu Air Base, and Banmaw Airport (Bhamo, Burma). After the war ended in 1945, a 1,390-mile (2,224 kilometer) route east to Clark Air Base in the Philippines was established. The route to Clark AB established a complete worldwide transport route for ATC.

The Flying Tigers Association visited in October 1982 and again in September 2005.

== Other facilities ==
Before merging into China Eastern Airlines, China Yunnan Airlines had its head office was located at the airport.

== Images ==
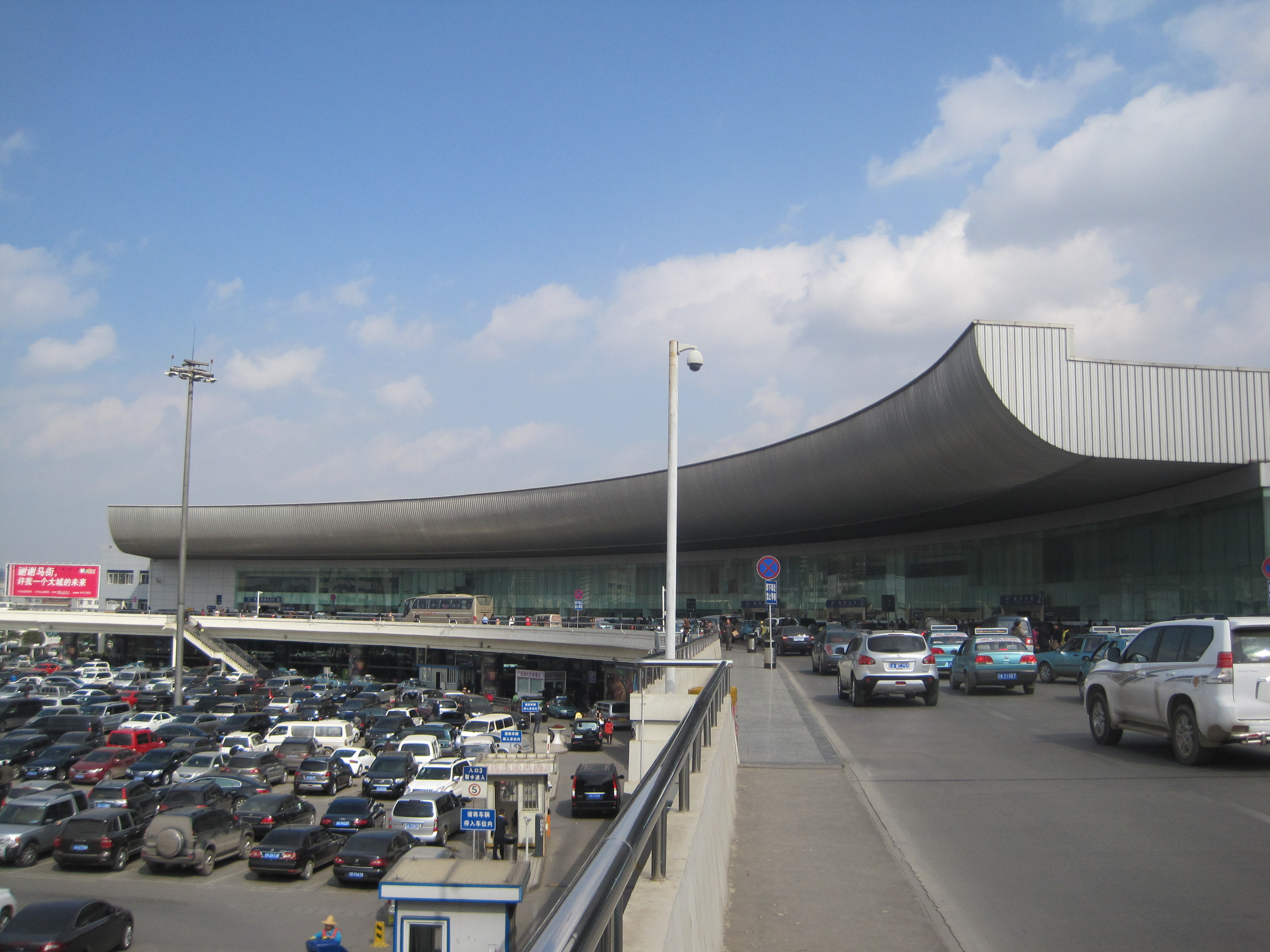
Main building

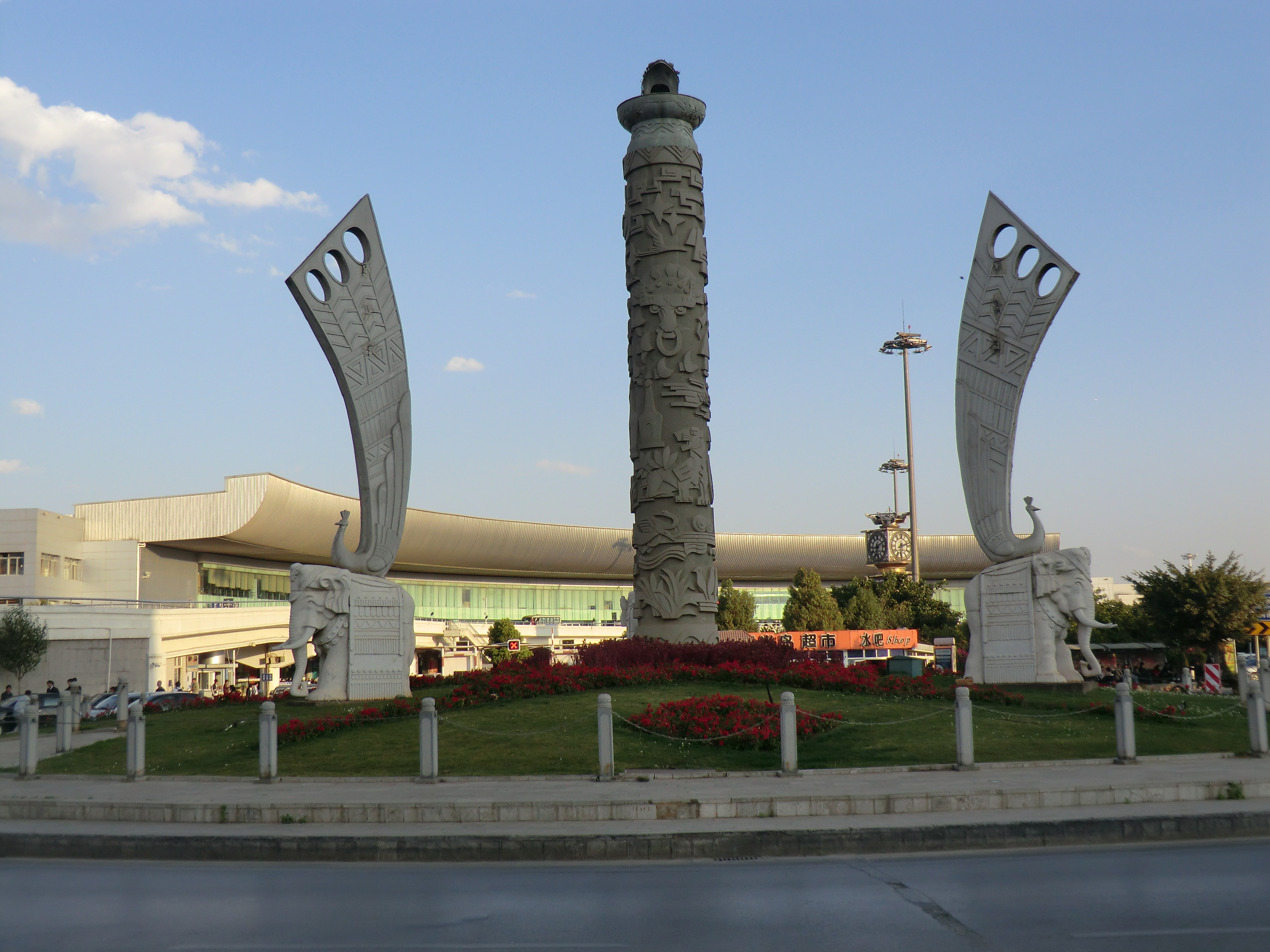
Front

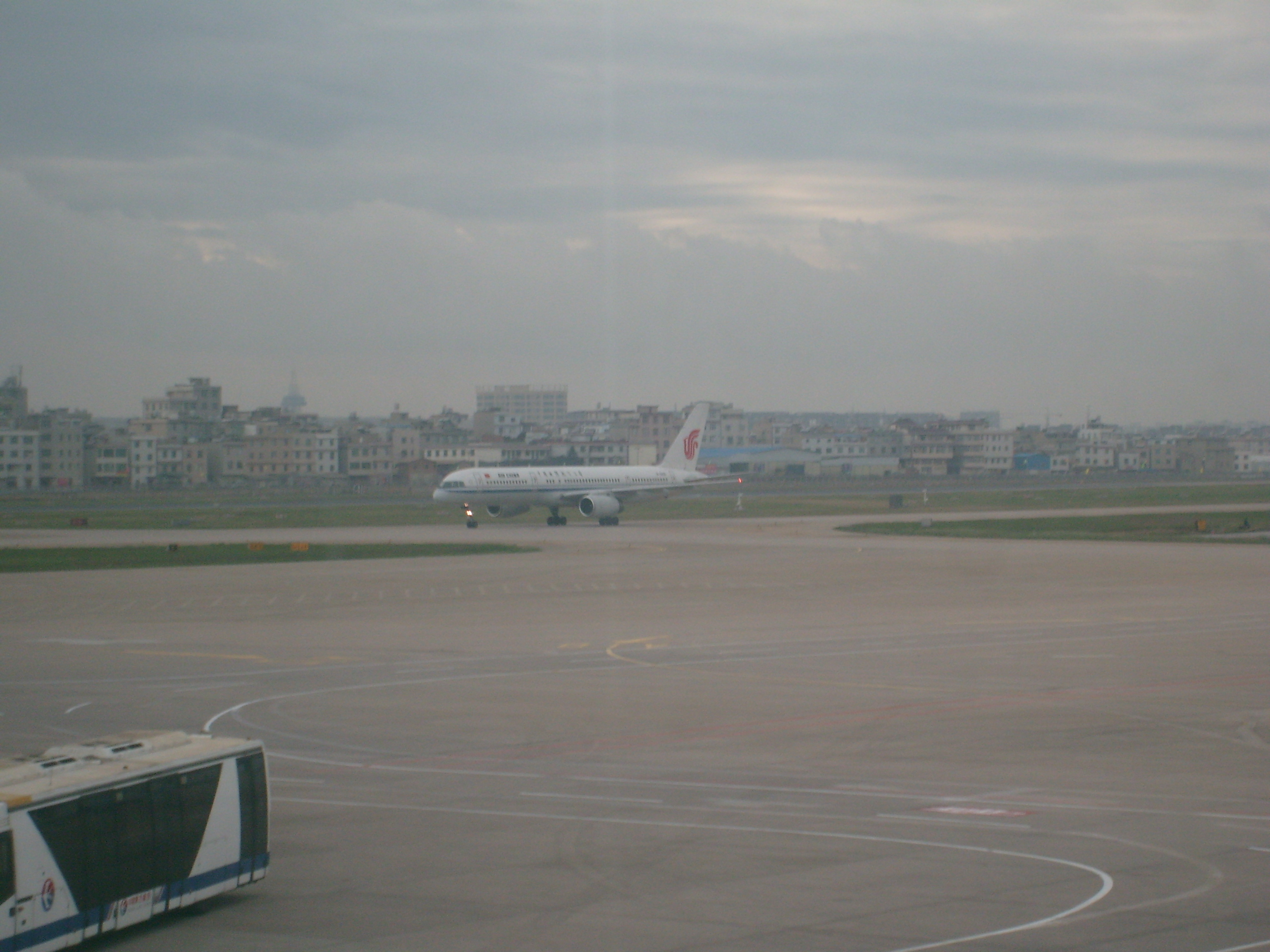
Runway

== See also ==
- List of airports in China
- List of the busiest airports in China
- Chengkung Airfield
