= CAAC Flight 3303 =

1982 aviation accident

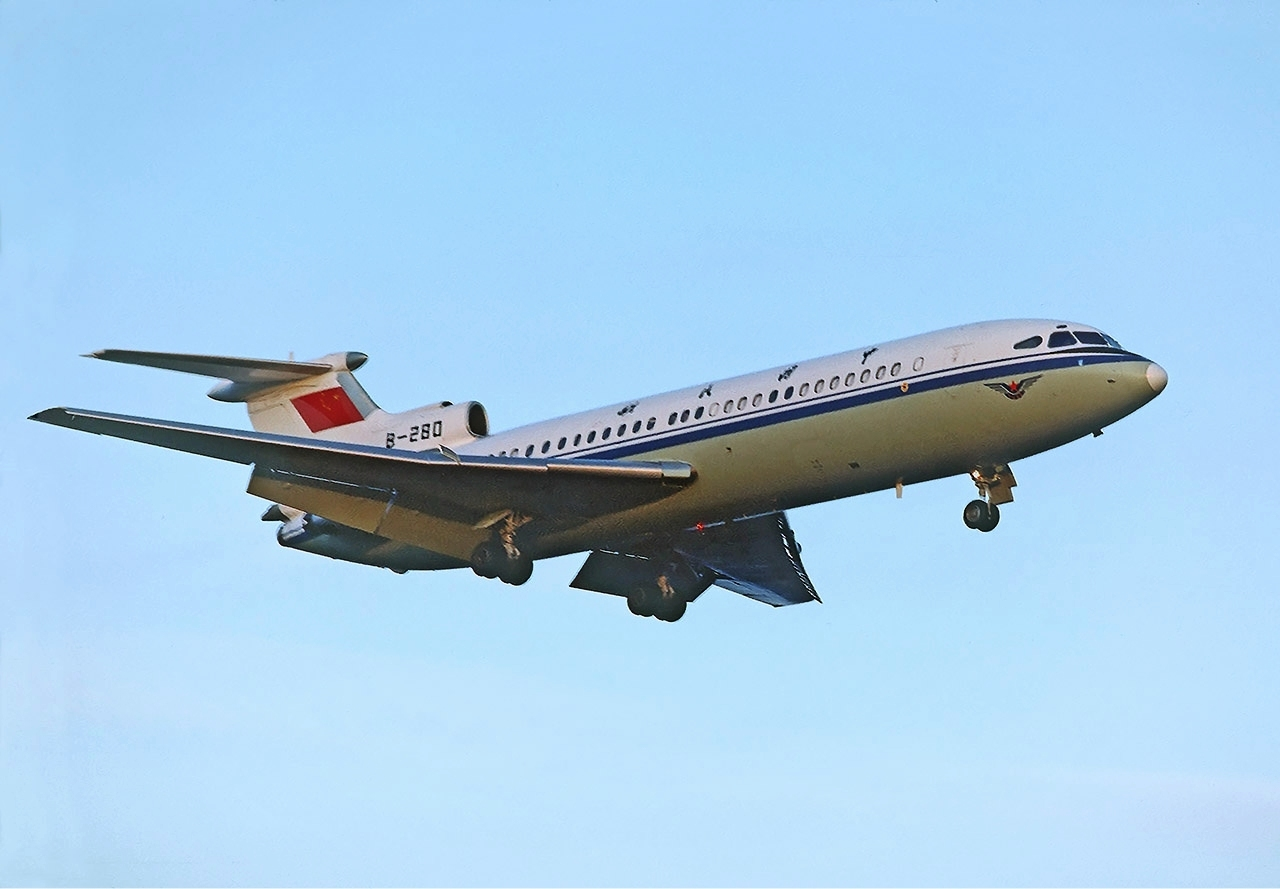
- A CAAC Hawker Siddeley Trident similar to the one involved.

Accident
- Date: 26 April 1982
- Summary: Controlled flight into terrain
- Site: Near Yangshuo, Guangxi, China

Aircraft
- Aircraft type: Hawker Siddeley Trident
- Operator: CAAC
- Registration: B-266
- Flight origin: Guangzhou Baiyun International Airport (former), China
- Destination: Guilin Qifengling Airport, China
- Occupants: 112
- Passengers: 104
- Crew: 8
- Fatalities: 112
- Survivors: 0

CAAC Flight 3303 was a scheduled domestic passenger flight from the former Guangzhou Baiyun International Airport to Guilin Qifengling Airport, China. It was serviced by a Hawker Siddeley Trident, registration B-266, that crashed into a mountain on 26 April 1982, killing all 112 people aboard.

== Aircraft and crew ==
The crashed aircraft was a Hawker Siddeley Trident 2E that first flew in 1975. The aircraft was owned by the Air Force but was operated by CAAC Airlines, Guangzhou division (now China Southern Airlines). The captain, Chen Huaiyao, was an experienced Chinese Air Force Trident pilot who had joined the Guangzhou General Administration of Civil Aviation of China in 1982. It was his first flight to Guilin. Co-pilot Chen Zaiwen, 31, had served in the Chinese Army and Air Force.

== Accident ==
At 16:45, as Flight 3303 was on approach to the airport in heavy rain, the crew wanted a north-to-south approach. The airport had no radar; the air traffic controller proceeded to misjudge the distance of the aircraft from the airport, and directed the flight to descend prematurely. The plane flew into a mountain near the town of Yangshuo, exploding and breaking up on impact. The accident killed all 112 people on board.

After the accident, Yangshuo County ordered 67 militiamen to protect the crash site. A Hong Kong Observatory spokesman said at the time that the Guangzhou-Guilin area had been affected by severe weather since 25 April.

=== Victims ===
Passengers and crew by nationality
Nationality	Passengers	Crew	Total
China	45	8	53
Hong Kong	52	0	52
United States	2	0	2
Unknown	5	0	5
Total	104	8	112
Source: Guilin Evening News, Aviation Safety Network

The Chinese government sent nearly 1,000 troops of the People's Liberation Army to the crash site to search for survivors. The operation ended after more than a week.

There were 52 people from Hong Kong on board, 37 of whom were part of a tour group. The dead included American entomologist Judson Linsley Gressitt and his wife as well as Hong Kong TVB artist Mak Dai-Shing, his wife and father-in-law's family. An unconfirmed report stated that several Japanese passengers were on board. Due to the explosion on impact, many bodies were highly fragmented.

== Investigation ==
The Civil Aviation Administration of China and the Guangdong Provincial Government investigated the accident. The likely reason for the crash was poor crew resource management, as well as inadequate and erroneous communication from air traffic control. The captain had no experience in flying the Guilin route, and the area is noted for limestone cliffs that make landing hazardous.

Autopilot error was another likely reason for the accident as the CAAC noted that the aircraft began to bank. The flight crew only realized these issues when the aircraft was banked 45 degrees. However, they mistook the data and continued to turn the yoke. The aircraft entered a bank of 180 degrees and crashed into the mountain.

== Aftermath ==
After the air crash, more than 40 victims were buried in a tomb located in section 022 of the Shenzhen Dapeng Bay Overseas Chinese Cemetery. The headstones have photos of the victims and their nationality. The words "April 26 Air Crash Cemetery" are written on it. The tombstone was provided free of charge by a Hong Kong investor in the cemetery named Mr. Liang. He also helped the families of the victims to pay nearly one million yuan in transportation and meals.

== See also ==
- China Southern Airlines Flight 3943, which also crashed on approach to Guilin
