= Hawker Siddeley Trident =

British airliner, 1962–1995

HS-121 Trident
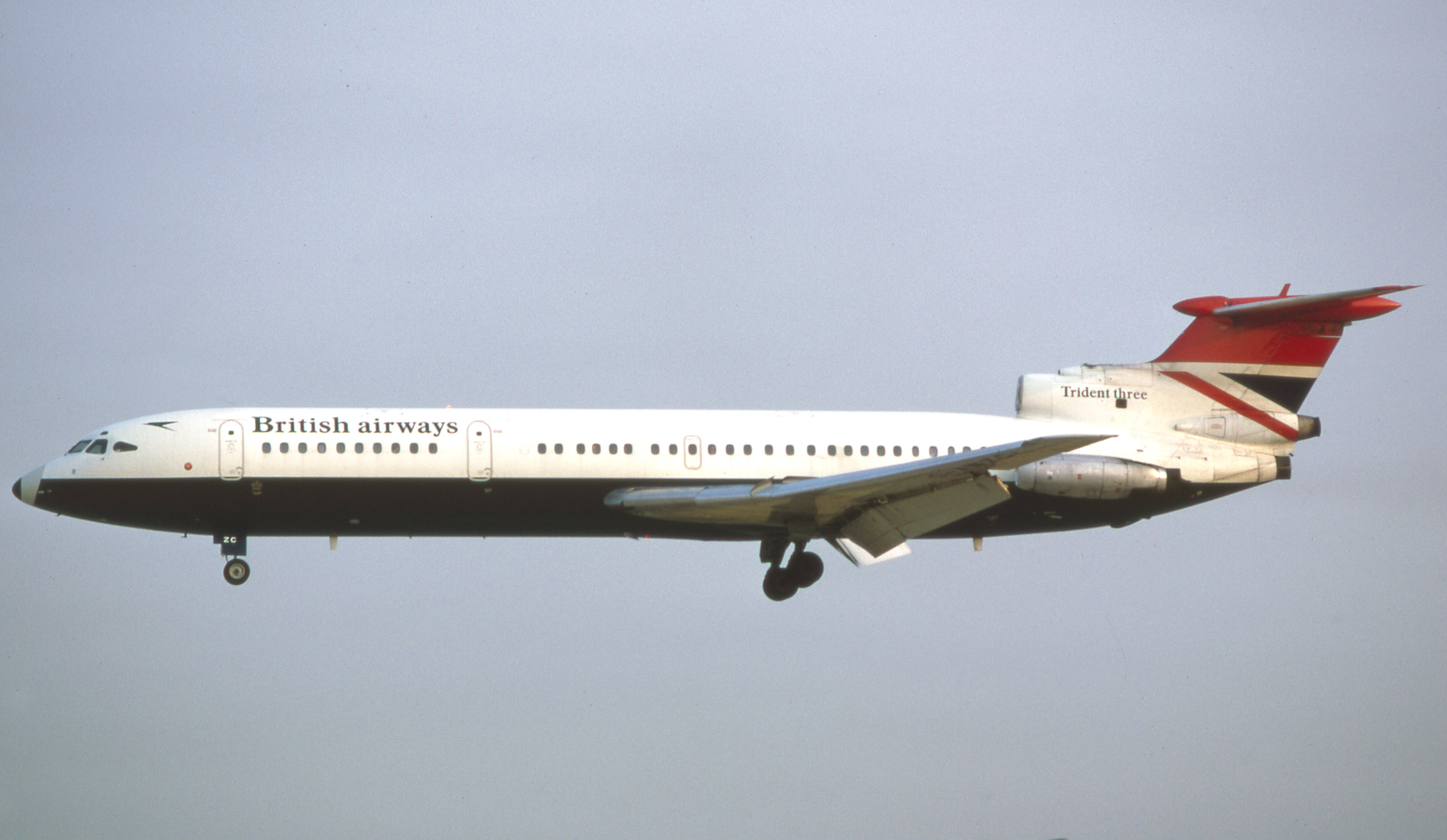
- British Airways Trident 3B

General information
- Type: Narrow-body airliner
- National origin: United Kingdom
- Manufacturer: Hawker Siddeley
- Designer: de Havilland
- Status: Retired
- Primary users: British European Airways British Airways; CAAC Airlines; Cyprus Airways
- Number built: 117

History
- Manufactured: 1962–1978
- Introduction date: 1 April 1964 with BEA
- First flight: 9 January 1962
- Retired: 1995

The Hawker Siddeley HS-121 Trident (originally the de Havilland DH.121 and briefly the Airco DH.121) is a British airliner produced by Hawker Siddeley. In 1957, de Havilland proposed its DH.121 trijet design to a British European Airways (BEA) request. By 1960, de Havilland had been acquired by Hawker Siddeley. The Trident's maiden flight happened on 9 January 1962, and it was introduced on 1 April 1964, two months after its main competitor, the Boeing 727. By the end of the programme in 1978, 117 Tridents had been produced. The Trident was withdrawn from service in 1995.

The jetliner is powered by three rear-mounted Rolls-Royce Spey low-bypass turbofans. It has a low swept wing and a T-tail. Advanced avionics allowed it to be the first airliner to make a blind landing in revenue service in 1965. The initial Trident 1/2 could seat 101–115 passengers over up to 2,350 nmi (2,700 mi; 4,350 km). The Trident 3 was stretched by 5 m (16 ft) to seat 180 over 1,940 nmi (3,590 km; 2,230 mi), and had an additional RB.162 booster engine in the tail.

== Development ==
=== Background and original specification ===
In 1953, as British European Airways (BEA) introduced the world's first turboprop-powered civil airliner – the Vickers Viscount – into passenger service, the operator was already considering what would be required of a potential successor. Following the entry into service of jet airliners in 1952, many airline managers and economists remained sceptical, and advocated turboprop airliners as replacements of piston-engined airliners. In 1953, while several manufacturers across the world were investing in pure jet-powered aircraft, BEA chose to favour turboprops on the basis of their superior economics and produced a specification that called for an aircraft capable of seating 100 passengers and attaining a maximum speed of 370 knots (430 mph; 690 km/h). As a result of the BEA specification, Vickers developed an enlarged derivative of the Viscount for BEA, the Vickers Vanguard, which was ordered by the airline on 20 July 1956. By this point, however, the French-built Sud Aviation Caravelle had conducted its maiden flight during the previous year, and BEA was beginning to recognise that jet aircraft could soon be providing stiff competition.

In April 1956, Anthony Milward, chief executive of BEA, stated that he "would rather do without [jet airliners]". Nevertheless, in December of that same year Lord Douglas of Kirtleside, BEA's chairman, stated that a number of jet-powered short haul aircraft might need to be introduced while retaining turboprop aircraft as the mainstay of the company's inventory for the foreseeable future. In July 1956, BEA had announced what it called "outline requirements" for a short-haul "second-generation jet airliner", to work alongside its turboprop fleet. It would carry a payload of some 20,000 lb (9,100 kg) or some 70 passengers up to 1,000 mi (870 nmi; 1,600 km), weigh about 100,000 lb (45,000 kg), use 6,000-foot (1,800 m) runways, cruise at a very high speed of 610 to 620 mph (530 to 540 kn; 980 to 1,000 km/h), and have "more than two engines". (Note: "B.E.A.'s feelings on these points were not inflexible. Their specification constituted a basis for discussion") According to aviation author Derek Woods, BEA "wanted something that was faster than the Caravelle which was threatening to be highly competitive". While they were not intended as an express requirement, commentators ever since have taken these figures to constitute a definite call to industry.

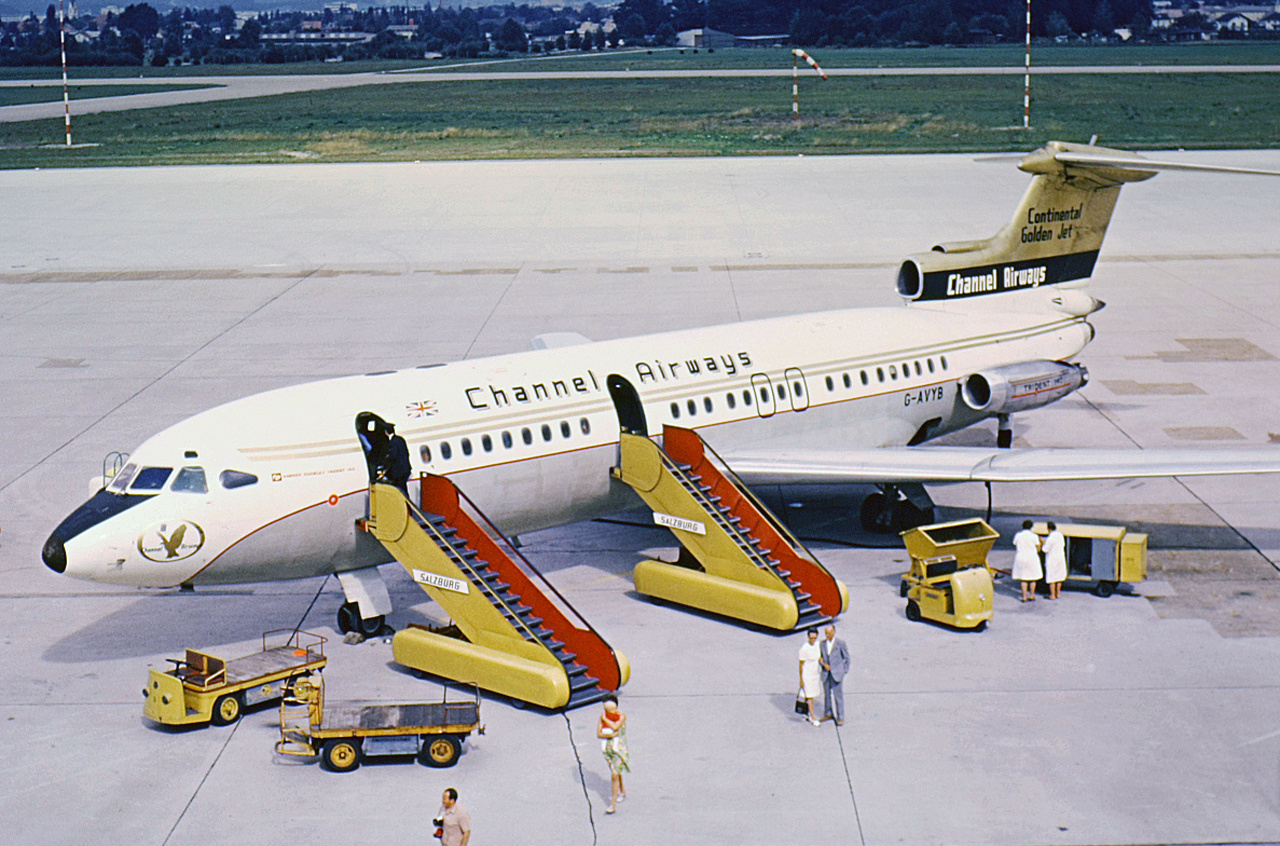
The Trident was one of the first trijets, with all three Rolls-Royce Spey engines rear-mounted

Four companies prepared projects to match the BEA outline. Bristol proposed the initially trijet Bristol Type 200. Avro proposed the futuristic Avro 740 trijet before shelving it and joining forces with Bristol and Hawker Siddeley. Vickers proposed the VC11 four-engined airliner, derived from its in-development VC10. The de Havilland company considered three possible contenders for the specification; two of these were four-engined variants of the D.H.118: the D.H.119 and the D.H.120, the latter being also intended to be offered to British Overseas Airways Corporation (BOAC). In July 1957, de Havilland made another submission in the form of the DH.121; this proposal was furnished with three turbojets, Rolls-Royce Avon engines, and greatly resembled the eventual production aircraft. By August 1957, the DH.121 proposal had been revised; differences included the adoption of the in-development turbofan, the Rolls-Royce Medway, and an expansion to accommodate a maximum of 98 passengers.

The DH.121 was to be the world's first trijet airliner. Its designers felt this configuration offered a trade-off between cruising economy and take-off safety in case of an engine failure; moreover, the BEA specification had called for "more than two engines". Each of the three engines would drive its own hydraulic system, offering triple redundancy in case of any of the other systems failing. The engines were to be 13,790 lbf (61.34 kN) Medway engines. The DH.121 was to have a gross weight of 123,000 lb (56,000 kg) or optionally, up to 150,000 pounds (68,000 kg), a range of 2,070 mi (1,800 nmi; 3,330 km), and seating for 111 in a two-class layout (or for over 140 in a high-density, single-class layout as typical from the 1960s onwards on inclusive-tour charter flights). The design initially included a cruciform tail layout similar to that of the Caravelle. The engines were clustered at the rear, with the centre engine situated in the extreme rear of the fuselage fed by air ducted through a large oval intake at the front of the fin, a configuration similar to the later Boeing 727; the design eventually settled on a variable-incidence T-tail.

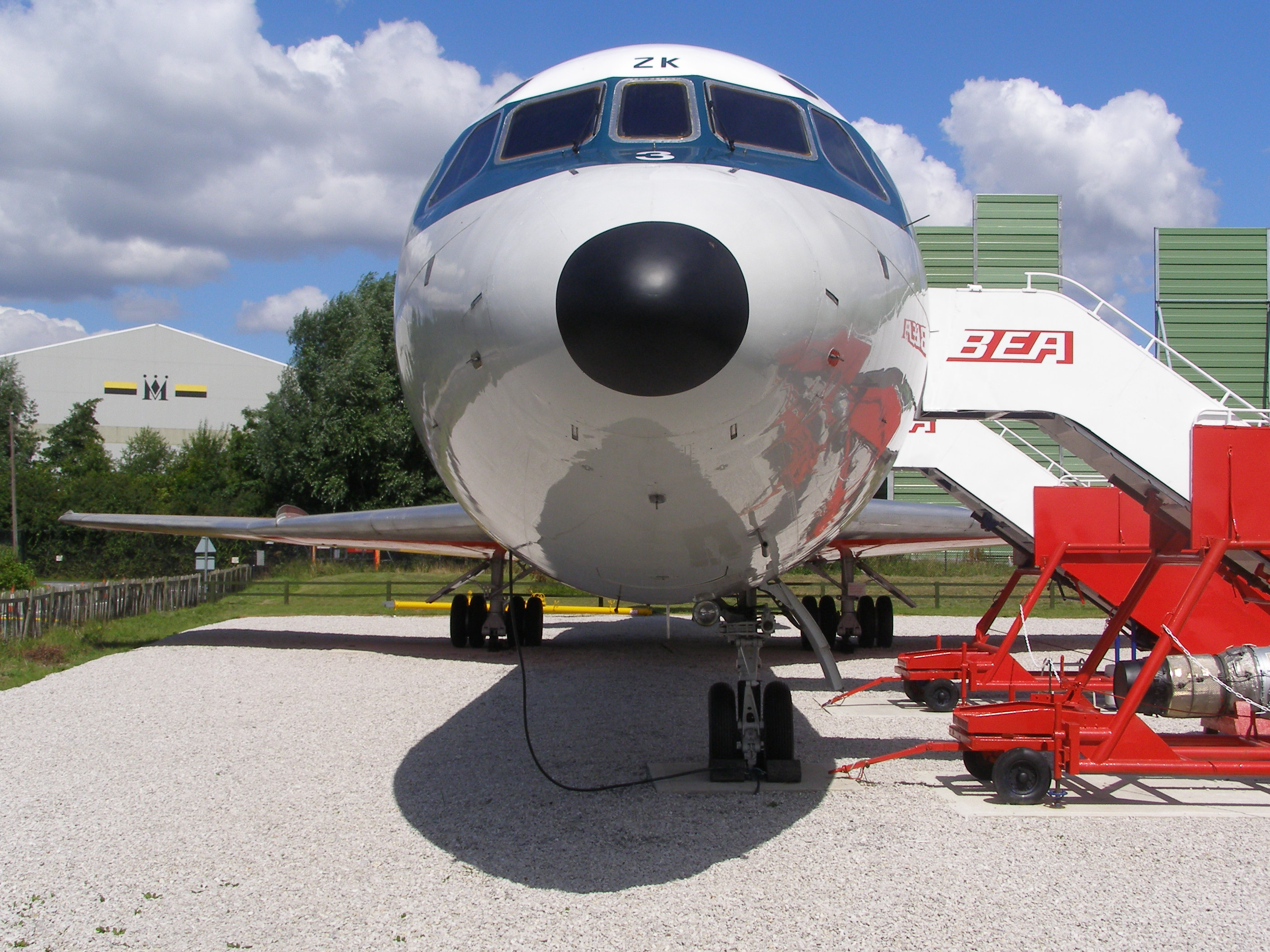
Offset nosewheel to accommodate a large avionics bay beneath the flight deck

From the outset, the DH.121 was planned to employ avionics that were very advanced for the period. Among other capabilities, they would offer automatic approach and landing within a few years of service entry. The avionics were also to have triplicated components for reliability and to allow "majority 2:1 voting" for aircraft guidance during automatic approach and landing. The physical dimensions of most avionics of the period required them to be housed in a large compartment beneath the Trident's flight deck; the compartment's size was among the factors dictating a distinctive nose undercarriage design, with the nose landing gear offset by 2 ft (61 cm) to the port side and retracting sideways to stow across the DH.121's longitudinal axis.

=== Industry consolidation and selection ===
BEA soon selected the DH.121 as the basis for detailed negotiations, but these talks were protracted due to multiple factors, including wider policy decisions of the British government and indecision within BEA itself. During the time that the DH.121 had emerged in the late 1950s, the British government came to view the airframe and aeroengine industries as too fragmented into small companies; accordingly, a policy favouring mergers into a few large groups was adopted. De Havilland was keen to retain their independence and leadership of the DH.121, so approached the government with a proposal to form a consortium under which de Havilland would produce the fuselage, Bristol would manufacture the wings, and various other companies, including Hunting Aircraft and Fairey Aviation, would be responsible for other elements; however, Bristol strongly opposed this arrangement and chose to work with Hawker Siddeley in competition against de Havilland.

Companies vigorously competed to be selected by BEA due to the lure of its £30 million contract (equivalent to £610,838,000 in 2025), as well as the likelihood of lucrative overseas export sales. On 4 February 1958, de Havilland, along with Hunting and Fairey, announced that they had agreed to form a partnership for the purpose of manufacturing and marketing the DH.121; the consortium adopted the corporate name of the defunct Airco company, which had been Geoffrey de Havilland's employer during the First World War. The Minister of Supply stated of the Airco consortium that "this is not quite what [he] had in mind". Nevertheless, both Airco and the rival Bristol-Hawker Siddeley team proceeded to conduct their own approaches to various overseas airlines; sufficiently interested, American Pan American World Airways invited both teams to present their proposed airliners in January 1958. Sir Matthew Slattery, chairman of Bristol and Short Brothers, appealed for BEA to delay any decision until after one of the competing firms had already secured an export order for their airliner. In response, Lord Douglas stated that BEA wished to order the DH.121 and was awaiting approval from the government; Douglas's reply has been viewed as the death knell for the rival Type 200 proposal.

Meanwhile, a rival airliner emerged, this time from Boeing in the United States, in the form of the 727, which also had a trijet configuration. Boeing had begun its studies into this sector of the market in 1956, and elected to launch its own trijet programme in 1959. Airco executives, who were at the time intensely exploring various alternatives and further partnerships with other aircraft companies, considered the possibility that Boeing might choose to drop the 727 project and instead co-manufacture the DH.121 in the USA; Lord Douglas was one of the proponents of this initiative. As a result, Airco invited a team of Boeing engineers and executives to Hatfield. Boeing later permitted a return visit by de Havilland representatives to Seattle, however the company revealed few details of their plans for the 727, while virtually all information on the DH.121 had been shared during the Hatfield visit, an openness that had allegedly "amazed" them. British commentators have tended to interpret this episode as involving the acquisition of sensitive proprietary data on the DH.121 by a direct competitor. Woods remarked that "de Havilland solemnly handed all its research over to its rivals ... the crowning piece of stupidity".

On 12 February 1958, the British government authorised BEA to commence contractual negotiations along with the issuing of a letter of intent for 24 aircraft. Accordingly, that same month, BEA announced that the DH.121 had come closest to its requirements and that it would proceed to order 24 with options on 12 more. A further six months were needed for the government to approve a formal BEA order for the DH.121; the government had favoured the Bristol 200 for industrial policy reasons. Reportedly, BEA had a considerable interest in the Caravelle itself, but this would have been a politically unacceptable choice. BEA also favoured de Havilland, and therefore the Trident submission, due to the firm's established experience with jet airliners with its prior development of the Comet.

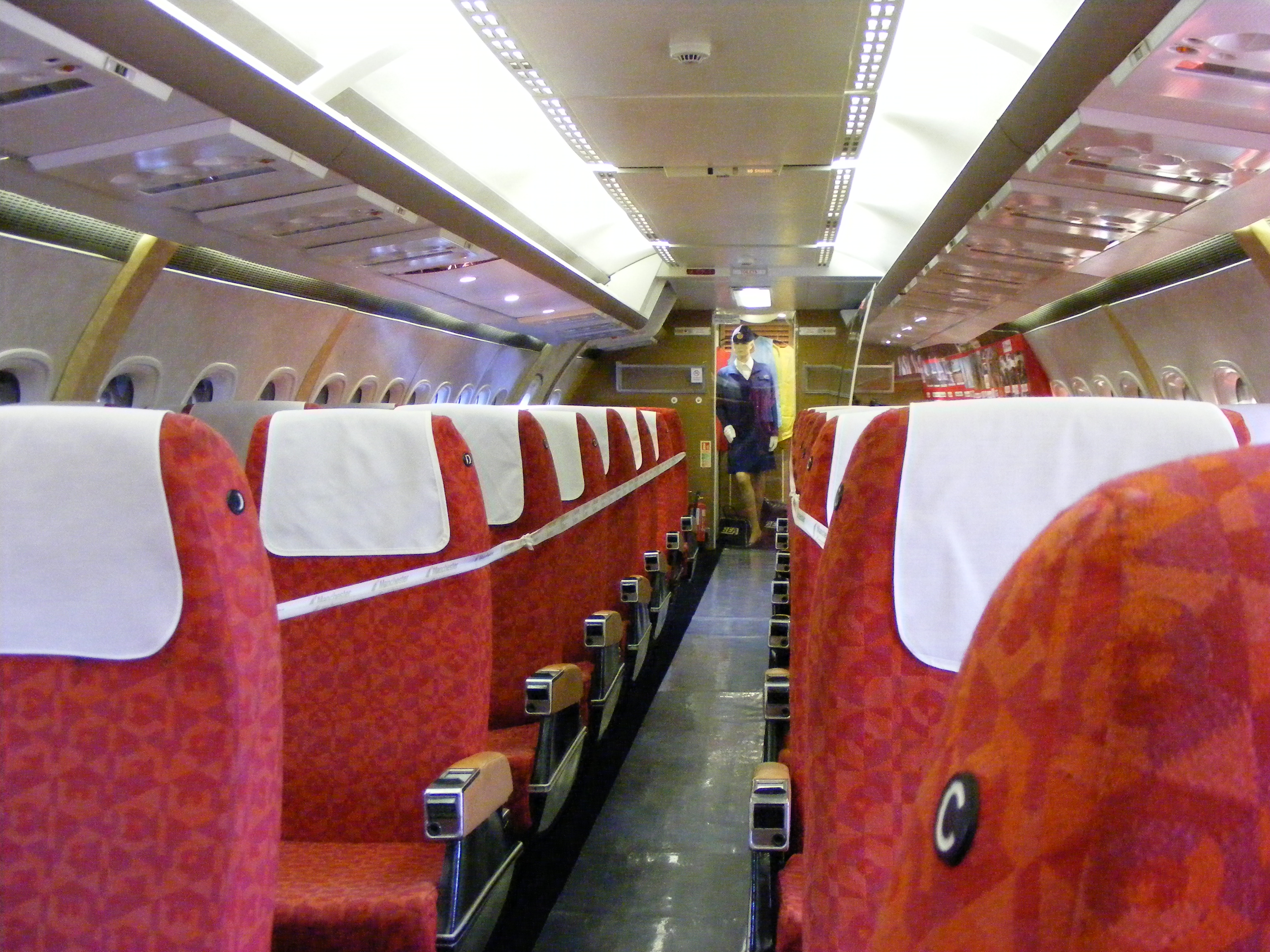
Six-abreast cabin

In April 1958, de Havilland firmed the general configuration of the DH.121 and established a development timetable, including a projected date for the type's maiden flight to be conducted during mid-1961. The company's market research department was forecasting that as many as 550 airliners in its category would be sold by 1965. Noting that a greater preference for the seating dimensions of what would become economy class was emerging amongst airlines, design alterations were made to adopt a slightly larger diameter fuselage to accommodate six-abreast seating, providing for a maximum configuration of 111 seats. According to Woods, this enlarged version of the DH.121 was "on the verge of building the right aeroplane for the market and the success of the Viscount looked like being repeated".

=== Revised specification ===
In March 1959, BEA, which had become concerned by a recent decline in passenger growth, concluded that the DH.121's payload-range capacity could be too great for their needs and petitioned de Havilland to reduce the scale of the design to suit their revised projections. Fearing that the proposed scale of the Trident was too large, the airline had elected to effectively tear up the programme for its redesigning for their immediate situation. In 1959, BEA had a large fleet in operation and on order, and the issue of overcapacity was a critical concern. The airline's concerns reflected three factors - a short-lived airline recession in the late 1950s; the imminent arrival into service of a large fleet of turboprop Vickers Vanguards, which duplicated the DH.121's general payload-range area; and the growing trend to higher-density seating.

Although de Havilland stated that they generally concurred with BEA, its management also stated that they had worked "under terms more onerous than anything D.H. had previously undertaken". Industry observers at the time felt that the British aircraft industry had again stumbled "into the pitfall of having designed exclusively for one customer an aeroplane that has potentially a much wider scope": a sentiment which would be echoed throughout the Trident's subsequent history. The de Havilland board elected to submit to BEA's demand, over-riding input from its own sales and market research departments, which indicated that other airlines sought the larger model, instead. Notably, de Havilland had not yet secured a formal and final BEA order and its competitor Bristol was actively promoting their 200 (Note: A later revision of the Bristol 200 proposal that was being promoted to BEA was designated as the Bristol 205) project, which was significantly smaller than the DH.121. At the time Boeing and Douglas were also downsizing their 727 and DC-9 projects. It was felt the original large DH.121 would have to compete against the Convair 880 and Boeing 720 some four years after their service entries, whereas a cut-back design would be more competitive against the then-projected 75–100 seat, twin-engined DC-9.

Downsizing the Trident involved substantial changes to the design being made, including a powerplant change from the Medway to a scaled-down derivative, the 40% less powerful 9,850 lb_{f} (43.8 kN) Rolls-Royce Spey 505. The gross weight was cut by about a third to 105,000 pounds (48,000 kilograms), while the range was cut by more than half to 930 mi (1,500 km; 810 nmi), and mixed-class seating was cut by about a quarter to 75 or 80 (97 in a single-class layout). Wing span was reduced by roughly 17 ft (5.2 m), wing area by 30%, and overall length by 13 ft (4.0 m). The revised design retained some features of the original one, notably its fuselage diameter. It had a smaller flight deck and single-axis, two-wheel, four-tyre main undercarriage legs in place of four-wheel bogies. Woods summarised the BEA-mandated redesign as: "At one blow the 121 was emasculated in terms of size, power and range".

Six months following BEA's request, de Havilland and the airline came to an agreement on the downsized DH.121. Details of the emerging aircraft, including its pioneering avionics, were announced to the public in early 1960. It was this revised aircraft that BEA ultimately ordered on 24 August 1959, initially in 24 examples with 12 options. In September 1960, the future airliner's name, Trident, was announced at the Farnborough Airshow; this name had been chosen as a reflection of its then-unique three-jet, triple-hydraulic configuration.

=== Further development and proposals ===
By 1960, de Havilland had been acquired by the Hawker Siddeley group. After the de Havilland takeover, Airco was disbanded. Hunting was marshalled into the competing newly formed British Aircraft Corporation (BAC); their departure removed any putative possibility of the Hunting 107 (later the BAC One-Eleven) being marketed alongside the DH.121 as a complementary, smaller member of the same airliner family. Fairey Aviation, partially incorporated into Westland Aircraft, also left the DH.121 project. (Note: Hunting and Fairey remained DH.121 subcontractors.) With the move to Hawker Siddeley Aviation, the designation was eventually revised to the HS 121. The reorganisation of the industry had compounded upon the delays caused by BEA's changes to the specification, which had in turn harmed the Trident's competitiveness against the Boeing 727.

The rival Boeing 727 had quickly established a lead over the Trident. The 727's early lead only strengthened it in subsequent competitions; one such example is Trans Australia Airlines, which had determined the Trident to be superior to the Boeing 727 from an operational standpoint, but it was also viewed as having been commercially risky to choose a different fleet from rival airlines such as Ansett Australia, which had already selected the 727. In 1972, its unit cost was US$7.8M. By 1975, only 117 Tridents had been sold against over 1,000 727s.

According to Woods, a significant opportunity that may have enabled the Trident to catch up with the 727 was lost during the 1960s in the form of two competitions for a maritime patrol aircraft; a NATO design competition to replace the Lockheed P-2 Neptune, and Air Staff Requirement 381, which sought a replacement for the Royal Air Force's piston-engined Avro Shackleton. Amongst the various submissions that had been produced in response was a bid by Avro, part of the Hawker Siddeley Group, which was designated as the Avro 776. The proposed Avro 776 mated the Trident's fuselage with a redesigned and enlarged wing along with more powerful Rolls-Royce RB178 engines capable of 16,300 lb of thrust. In addition to the maritime patrol requirement, Avro envisioned that the aircraft could be used in various military roles, including as a 103-seat troop transport and as being armed with up to four GAM-87 Skybolt air-launched ballistic missiles as a nuclear-armed bomber. In addition to Avro's proposals, Armstrong Whitworth had also proposed their own military variants of the Trident.

Later revisions of the Avro 776 substituted the RB.178 engine for the newer turbofan, the Rolls-Royce RB211, the development of the latter being supported by the 776's procurement if selected. Rolls-Royce Limited, having shelved development of the Medway following the Trident's redesign, was keen to develop an engine to slot between the 10,000 lb Spey engine and the 20,000 lb Rolls-Royce Conway engine; if such an engine had been produced, it could have equipped new versions of the civil Trident, as well. Furnished with a more capable engine that could provide more thrust than the Spey could, an extended fuselage could also have been adopted and existing landing restrictions could have been discarded; overall, the Trident would have been a far closer match to the 727. Wood summarised the importance of this prospective development as: "For the Trident programme, the RB.177 would have been a God-send".

At one point, the Avro 776 looked set to win the competition to be selected as the RAF's new maritime patrol aircraft. Due to a desire to cut costs, though, the RAF decided to issue an entirely new operational requirement, under which the demands for speed, endurance, and capacity had all been diminished. As a result of the changes, the design team was recalled and the Avro 776 was entirely sidelined for a new proposal. This new proposal, based upon the de Havilland Comet's fuselage, had little to do with the Trident save for the use of its existing Spey engines; this would go on to be selected and procured as the Hawker Siddeley Nimrod. As a result of this loss, prospects for an enlarged, higher-power Trident effectively evaporated.

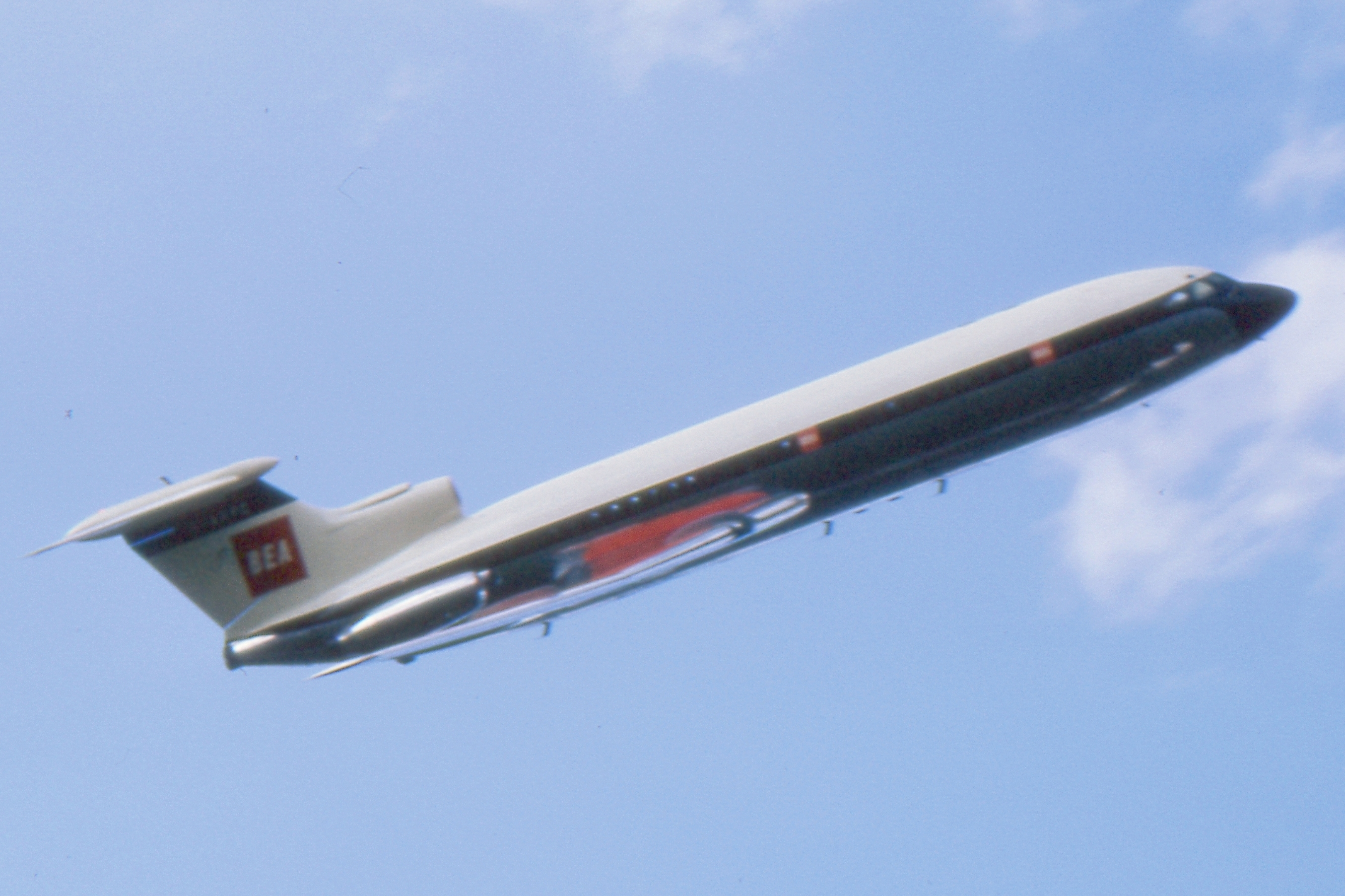
A 35-m-long Trident 1C at the September 1962 Farnborough Airshow, before its April 1964 introduction

Hawker Siddeley Aviation, which had absorbed de Havilland, needed additional customers for the Trident, so entered into discussions with American Airlines (AA) in 1960. AA requested greater range than what the aircraft initially had, which meant that the original DH121 design would have fulfilled its requirements almost perfectly. In response, design began on a new Trident 1A, powered with up-rated Rolls-Royce Spey 510 engines of 10,700 lbf (47.6 kN) thrust, and a larger wing with more fuel, raising gross weight to 120,000 lb (54,000 kg) and range to 1,800 mi (1,600 nmi; 2,900 km), but AA eventually declined the aircraft in favour of the Boeing 727.

Some of these changes were added into the original prototype, and it was renamed the Trident 1C. The main difference was a larger fuel tank in the centre section of the wing, raising weights to 115,000 lb (52,000 kg), and range to 1,400 mi (1,200 nmi; 2,300 km). The first Trident 1, G-ARPA, made its maiden flight on 9 January 1962 from Hatfield Aerodrome.

== Design ==
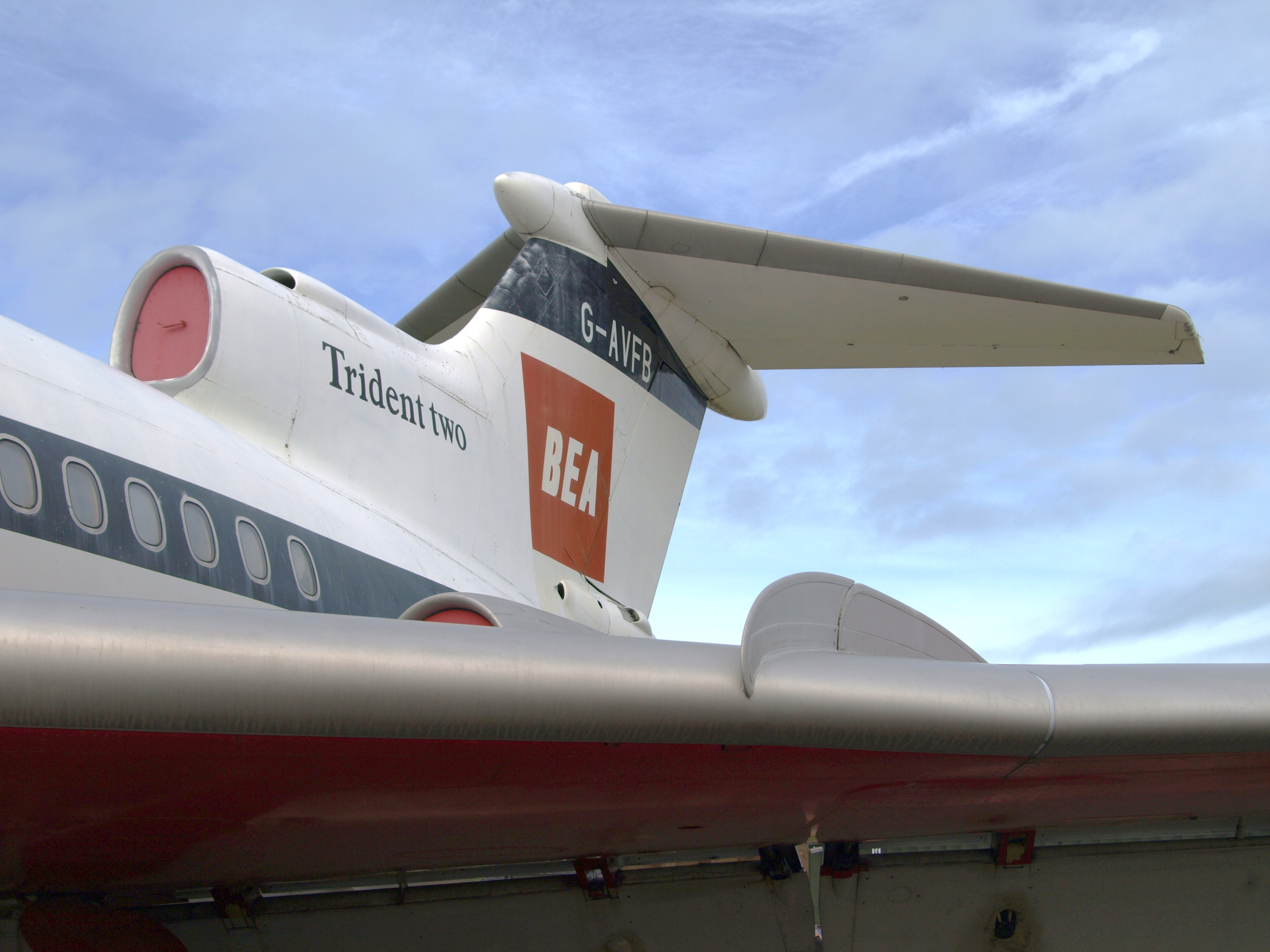
T-tail and retracted leading edge devices of a Hawker Siddeley Trident

=== Overview ===
The Trident was a jet airliner of all-metal construction with a T-tail and a low-mounted wing with a quarter-chord sweepback of 35 degrees. It had three rear-mounted engines: two in side-fuselage pods, and the third in the fuselage tailcone, with an S-shaped intake duct. One version, the 3B, had a fourth "boost" engine with a separate intake duct above the main S-duct. All versions were powered by versions of the Rolls-Royce Spey, while the boost engine was a Rolls-Royce RB162, originally intended as a lift engine for VTOL applications.

The Trident was one of the fastest subsonic commercial airliners, cruising at over 610 mph (980 km/h). At introduction into service its cruise Mach Number was 0.88/ 380 kn IAS. Designed for high speed, with a critical Mach number of 0.93, the wing produced relatively limited lift at lower speeds. This, and the aircraft's low thrust-to-weight ratio, called for prolonged takeoff runs. Nevertheless, the Trident fulfilled BEA's 6,000 ft (1,800 m) field length criterion and its relatively staid airfield performance was deemed adequate before the arrival into service of the Boeing 727 and later jet airliners built to 4,500 ft (1,400 m) field length criteria. The aerodynamics and wing was developed by a team led by Richard Clarkson, who would later use the Trident wing design as the basis for the wing of the Airbus A300; for the Trident he won the Mullard Award in 1969.

The Trident normal descent rate was up to 4500 ft/min (23 m/s). In emergency descents of up to 10,000 ft/min, it was permissible to use reverse thrust. Below 280 kn IAS, it was also possible to extend the main landing gear for use as an airbrake. The Trident's first version, Trident 1C, had the unusual capability of using reverse thrust prior to touchdown. The throttles could be closed in the flare and reverse idle set to open the reverser buckets. At pilot discretion, up to full reverse thrust could then be used prior to touchdown. This was helpful to reduce hydroplaning and give very short landing runs on wet or slippery runways while preserving wheel brake efficiency and keeping wheel brake temperatures low. Brakes were fitted with the Dunlop Maxaret anti-skid system.

=== Avionics ===
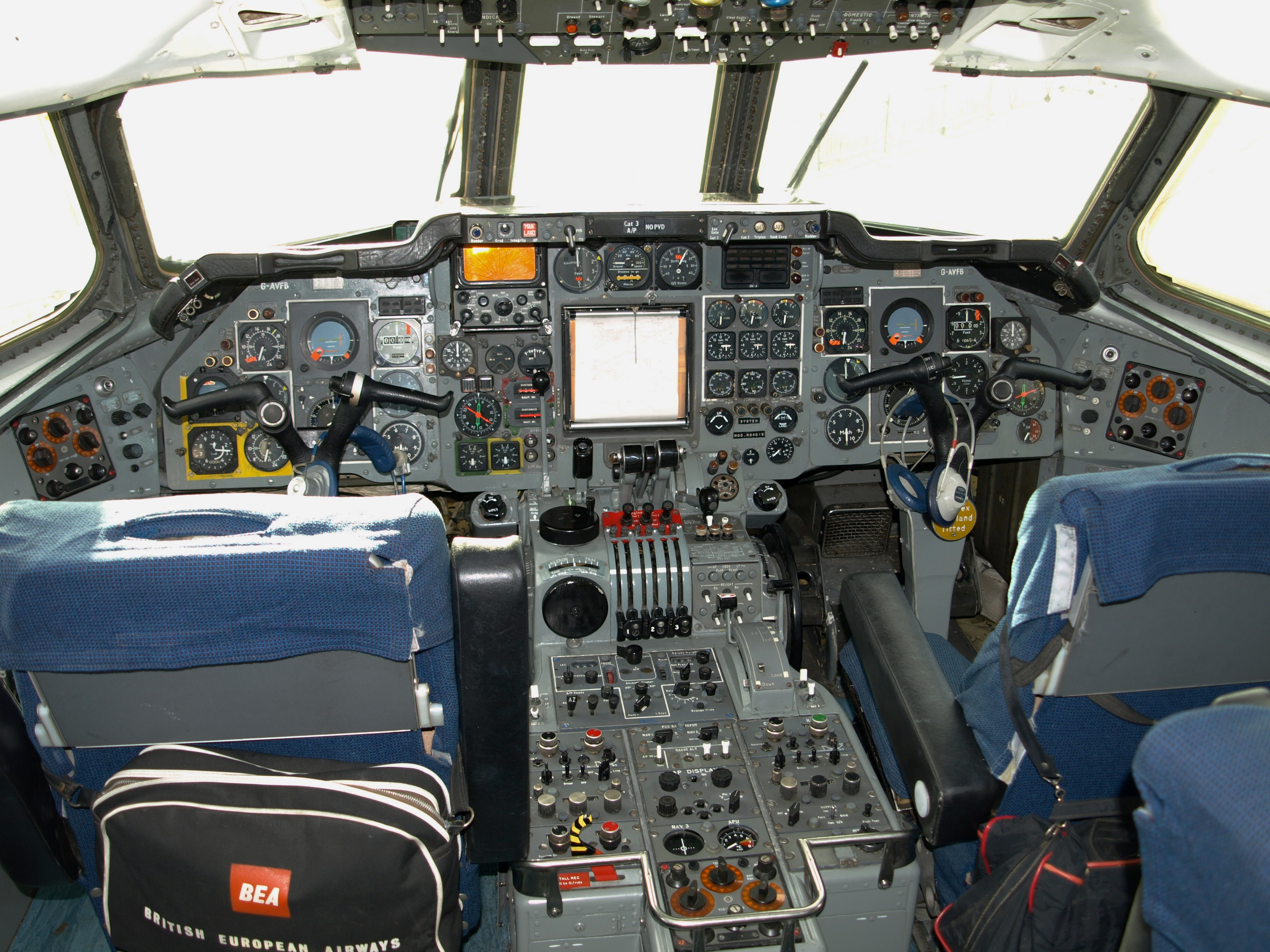
Flight deck of a Trident 2E: there are orange "Triplex autoland fitted" placards on the control columns and the moving map display on the centre instrument panel

The Trident had a complex, sophisticated and comprehensive avionics fit which was successful in service. This comprised a completely automatic blind landing system developed by Hawker Siddeley and Smiths Aircraft Instruments. It was capable of guiding the aircraft automatically during airfield approach, flare, touchdown and even roll-out from the landing runway. The system was intended to offer autoland by 1970. In the event, it enabled the Trident to perform the first automatic landing by a civil airliner in scheduled passenger service on 10 June 1965 and the first genuinely "blind" landing in scheduled passenger service on 4 November 1966.

The ability to land in fog solved a major problem at London Heathrow and other British airports. Delays were commonplace when Category 1 (Cat 1 = 200 ft (61 m) decision height and 600 metre runway visual range RVR) instrument landing system (ILS) was in use. The Trident's autoland system pioneered the use of lower landing minima, initially with Category 2 (100 ft decision height and 400 metres RVR) and soon after "zero-zero" (Category 3C) conditions. Since Tridents could operate safely to airfields equipped with suitable ILS installations, they could operate schedules regardless of weather, while other aircraft were forced to divert.

The Trident's advanced avionics displayed the aircraft's current position relative to the ground on a moving map display on the centre instrument panel. This electro-mechanical device also recorded the aircraft's track using a stylus plotting on a motor-driven paper map. Positional information was given by a Doppler navigation system which read groundspeed and drift data which, alongside heading data, drove the stylus.

The Trident was the first airliner fitted with a quick access flight data recorder. This sampled 64 variables, converted them into a digital format, and stored them on magnetic tape for ground analysis. Later the system included a voice recorder.

== Operational history ==
=== Introduction ===
The first Trident entered service on 1 April 1964. By 1965, 15 Tridents were in BEA's fleet, and by March 1966, the fleet had increased to 21. Hawker Siddeley proposed an improved 1C, the Trident 1E. This would be powered by 11,400 lbf (51,000 N) Spey 511s, have a gross weight of 135,600 lb (61,500 kg), an increased wing area by extending the chord, leading-edge slats for improved field performance, different take-off flap settings (a 23 degree setting shortened the runway length required but imposed a 59,900 kg (132,100 lb) MTOW), and the same fuselage, but with up to 140 seats in a six-abreast configuration. This specification took the 1C closer to the larger concept of the original DH121, but with 7,000 lbf (31,000 N) less thrust. Only a few sales of the new design were made, three each for Kuwait Airways and Iraqi Airways, four for Pakistan International Airlines (later sold to CAAC), two each for Channel Airways and Northeast Airlines, and one for Air Ceylon. Channel Airways' aircraft were equipped with cramped, 21 in (530 mm) seat pitch, seven-abreast seating in the forward section, seating 149 passengers.

=== Trident 2E ===
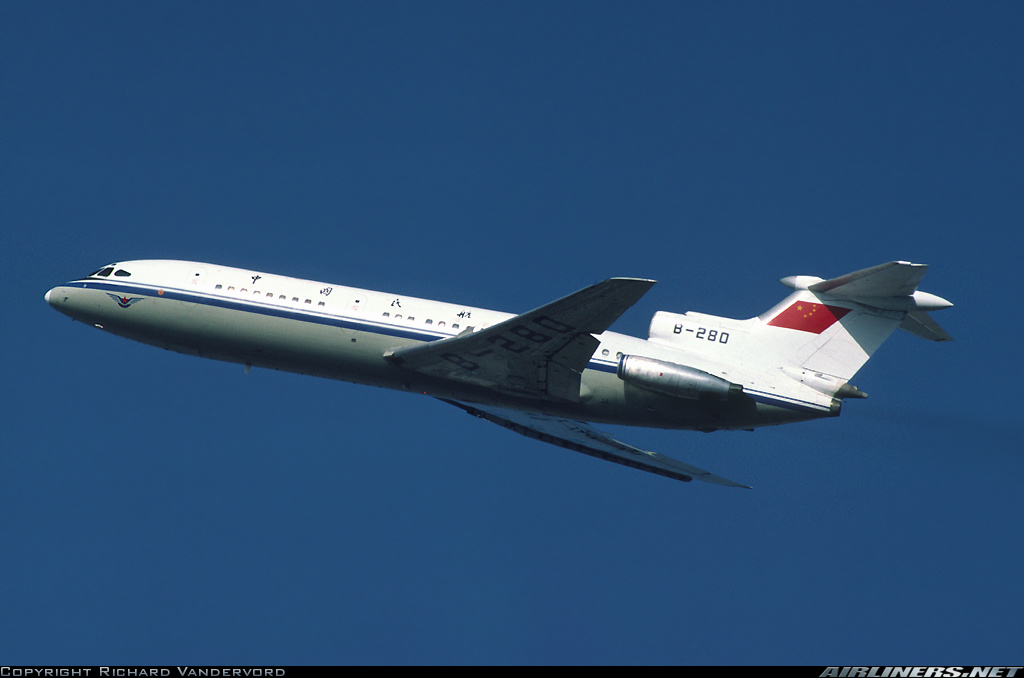
CAAC Hawker Siddeley HS-121 Trident 2E

BEA decided that the Trident was too short-legged for its ever-expanding routes, and that an even longer-ranged version was needed. Hawker Siddeley responded with the Trident 1F. It would have the Spey 511 engines, a 2.8 m (9 ft 2 in) fuselage stretch, a gross weight of 132,000 lb (60,000 kg) and up to 128 seats in the original five-abreast configuration. BEA planned to buy 10 1Fs, plus an option for 14 further aircraft.

As work continued on the 1F the changes became so widespread that it was renamed the Trident 2E, E for Extended Range. Now powered by newer Spey 512s with 11,930 lbf (53,100 N) thrust, it also replaced wing leading-edge droop flaps with slats, and extended the span with Küchemann-style tips. It had a gross weight of 142,400 lb (64,600 kg) and a 2,000 mi (3,200 km) range.

BEA bought 15, while two were bought by Cyprus Airways. CAAC, the Chinese national airline, bought 33. The first flight of this version was made on 27 July 1967 and it entered service with BEA in April 1968.

=== Trident 3B ===
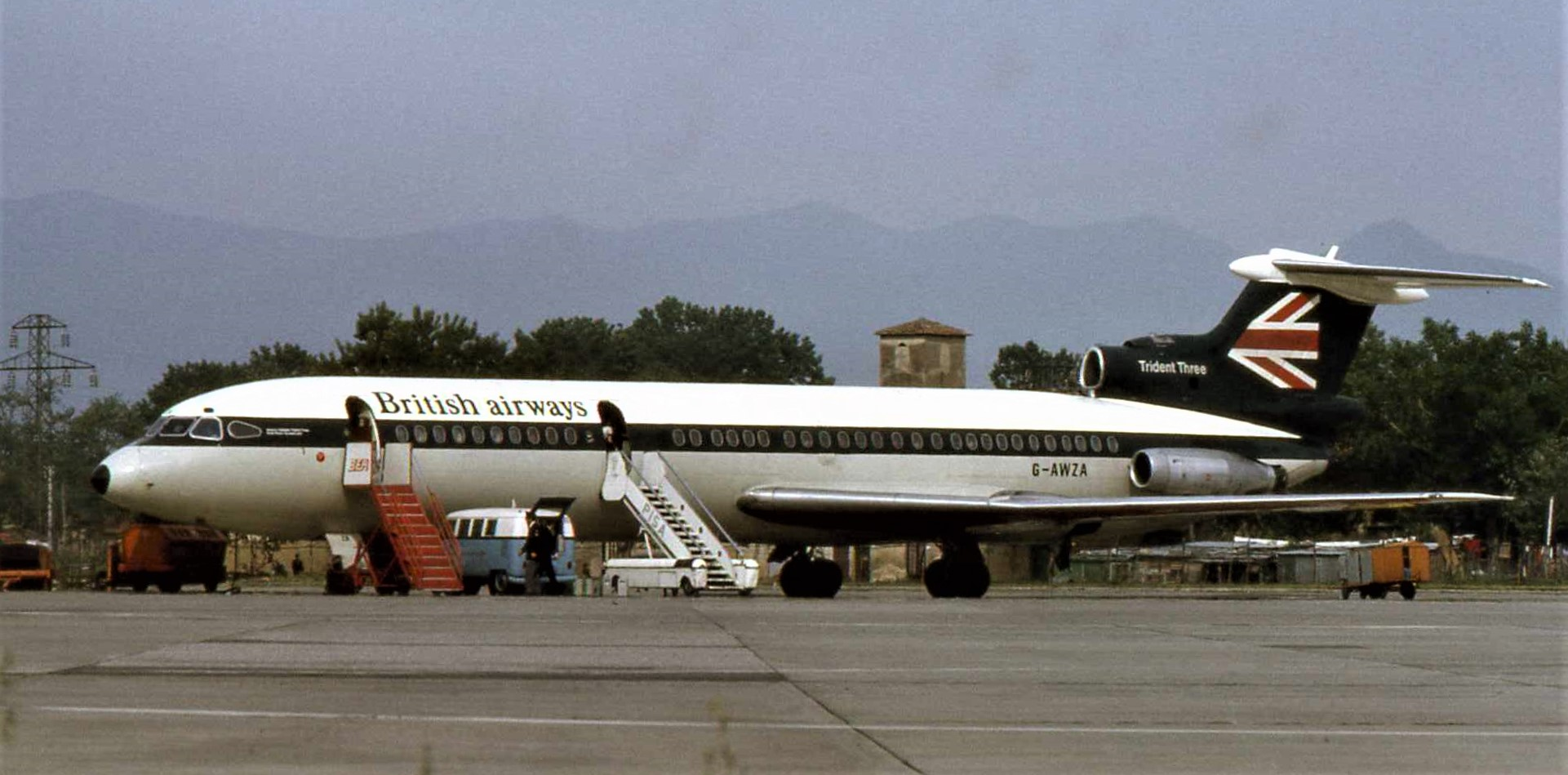
The Trident 3B, stretched by 5 m (16 ft) for up to 180 seats

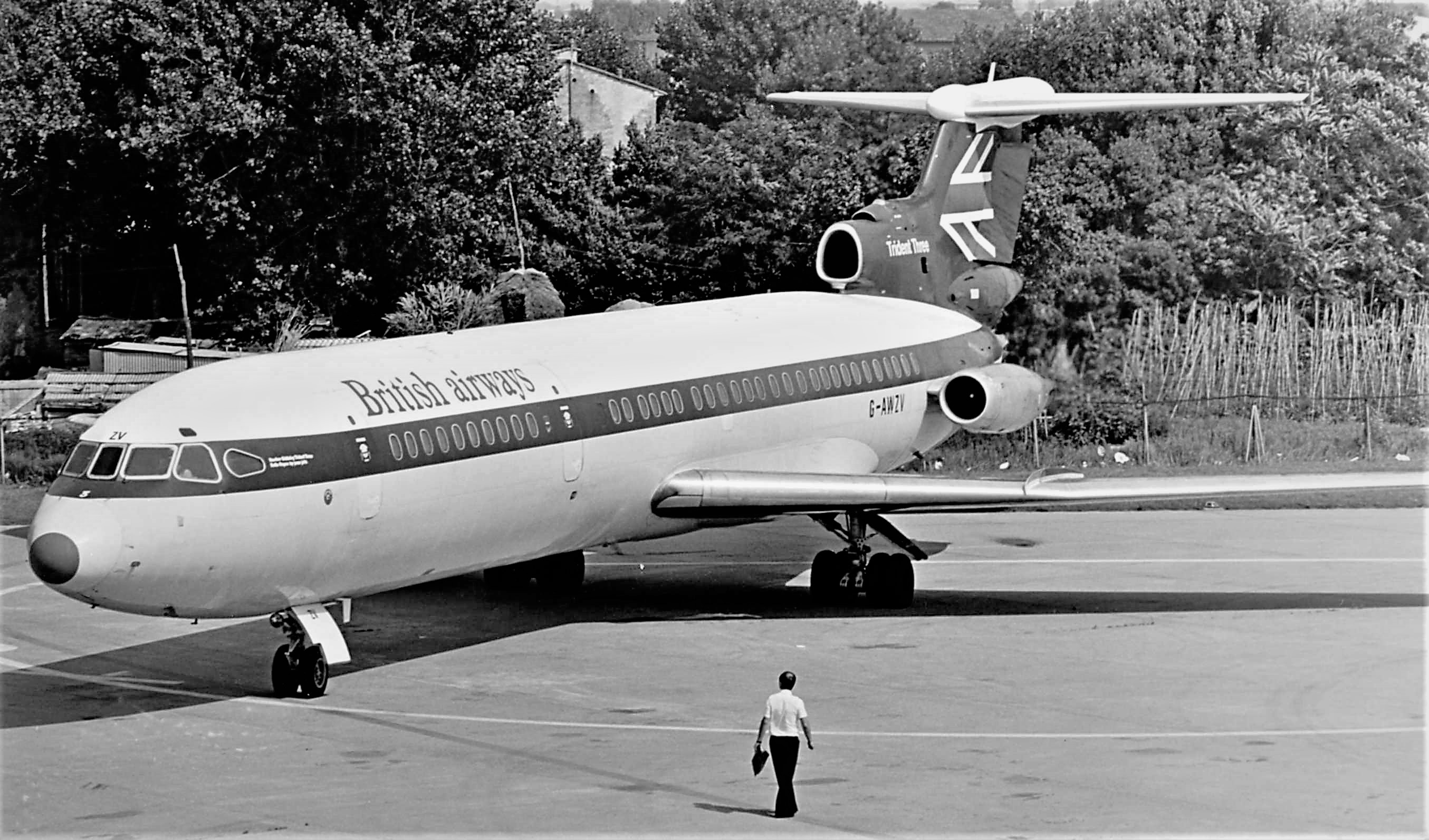
A British Airways Hawker Siddeley Trident 3B (G-AWZV) parked on the apron, c. 1970s.

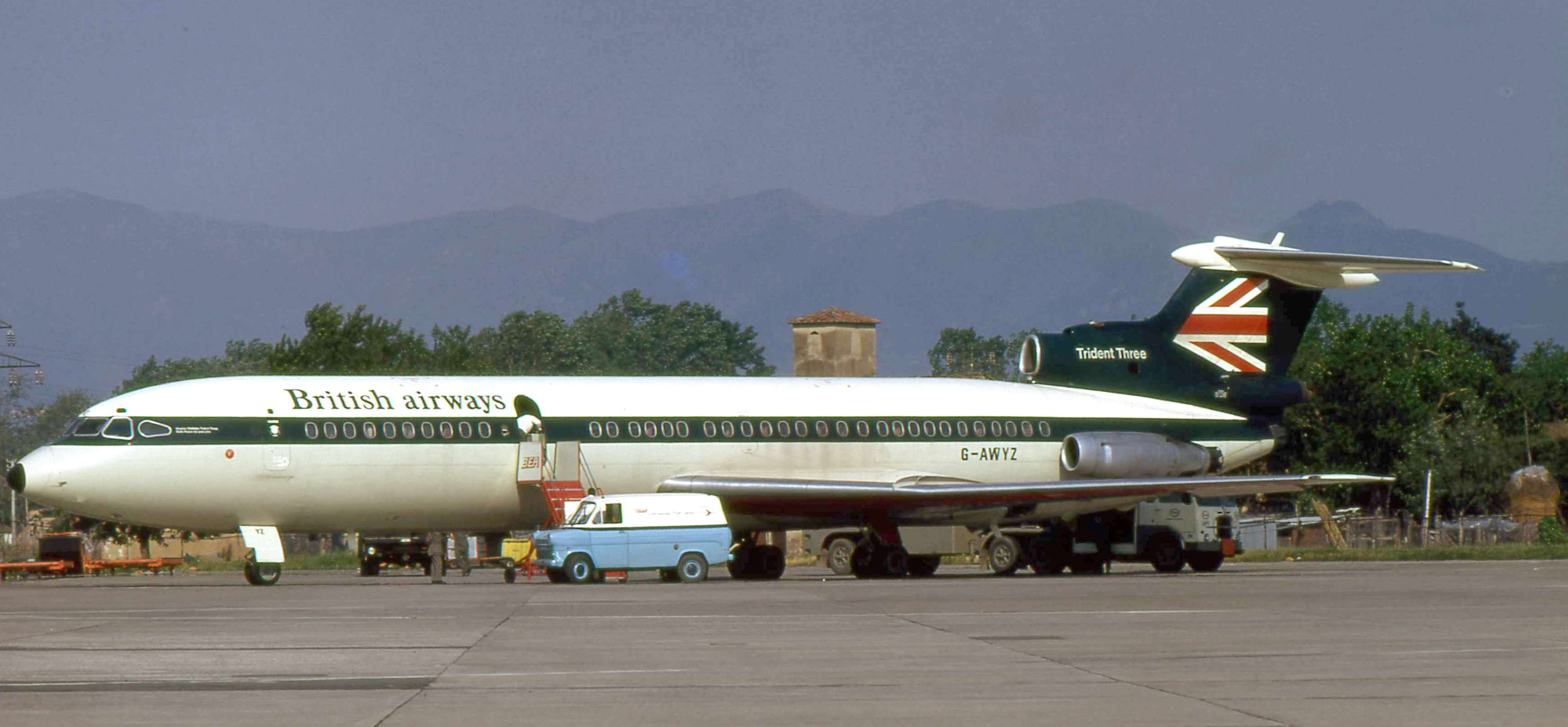
A British Airways Hawker Siddeley Trident 3B (G-AWZA) on the tarmac at Pisa Airport, c. 1970s.

The Trident was becoming the backbone of BEA's fleet and BEA wanted an even larger aircraft. Hawker Siddeley offered two new designs in 1965: a larger 158-seat two-engine aircraft otherwise similar to the Trident known as the HS132; and the 185-seat HS134, which moved the engines under the wings, a design very similar to the Boeing 737. Both were to be powered by a new high-bypass engine under development at the time, the Rolls-Royce RB178. BEA instead opted for Boeing 727s and 737s to fill the roles of both the BAC 1–11 and Trident, but this plan was vetoed by the British government.

BEA returned to Hawker Siddeley and chose a stretched version of the basic Trident, the Trident 3. A fuselage stretch of 5 m (16 ft 5 in) made room for up to 180 passengers; Hawker Siddeley raised the gross weight to 143,000 lb (65,000 kg) and made modifications to the wing to increase its chord; the engines remained the same. BEA rejected the design as being unable to perform adequately in "hot and high" conditions, in light of such difficulties experienced with the Trident 2E. Since the Spey 512 was the last of the Spey line, extra thrust would be difficult to obtain. Instead of attempting to replace the three engines with a different type, which would have been difficult with one engine buried in the tail, Hawker Siddeley's engineers decided to add a fourth engine in the tail, the tiny Rolls-Royce RB162 turbojet, fed from its own intake behind a pair of movable doors. The engine added 15 per cent more thrust for takeoff, while adding only 5 per cent more weight, and it would only be used when needed. BEA accepted this design as the Trident 3B, and ordered 26. The first flight was on 11 December 1969 and the aircraft entered service on 1 April 1971. Addition of extra fuel capacity resulted in the Super Trident 3B.

The Trident experienced some key export sales, particularly to China. Following a thawing of relations between Britain and the People's Republic of China, China completed several purchase deals and more than 35 Tridents were eventually sold.

In 1977, fatigue cracks were discovered in the wings of British Airways Tridents. The aircraft were ferried back to the manufacturer and repaired, then returned to service.

The beginning of the Trident's end came in the early 1980s, since ICAO began drafting noise regulations that would require first- and second-generation jet airliners to fit hush kits to the engines. These regulations would go into effect on 1 January 1986. British Airways, the type's main operator, saw the refits as not viable and instead chose to phase the Trident out of their fleet in 1985, the final flights were made on 31 December 1985. The Trident's services in China ended in 1995, marking its permanent retirement from service. Only 117 Tridents were produced and all are out of service. In contrast, 1,832 Boeing 727 aircraft (designed to the Trident's original specification) were built and the last continued in passenger service until 2019.

== Variants ==
Trident 1C
Production version for British European Airways; 24 built
Trident 1E
Increased seating capacity, uprated engines, and addition of leading edge slats over the Trident 1C; 15 built
Trident 2E
An improved Trident 1E with triplex autoland system; 50 built
Trident 3B
High-capacity short-medium range version of the 2E with a 16 ft 5 in (5.00 m) stretch and one additional RB.162 booster engine (for take-off and climb) in the tail; 26 built
Super Trident 3B
Extended range by 692 km (430 miles); two built

== Operators ==
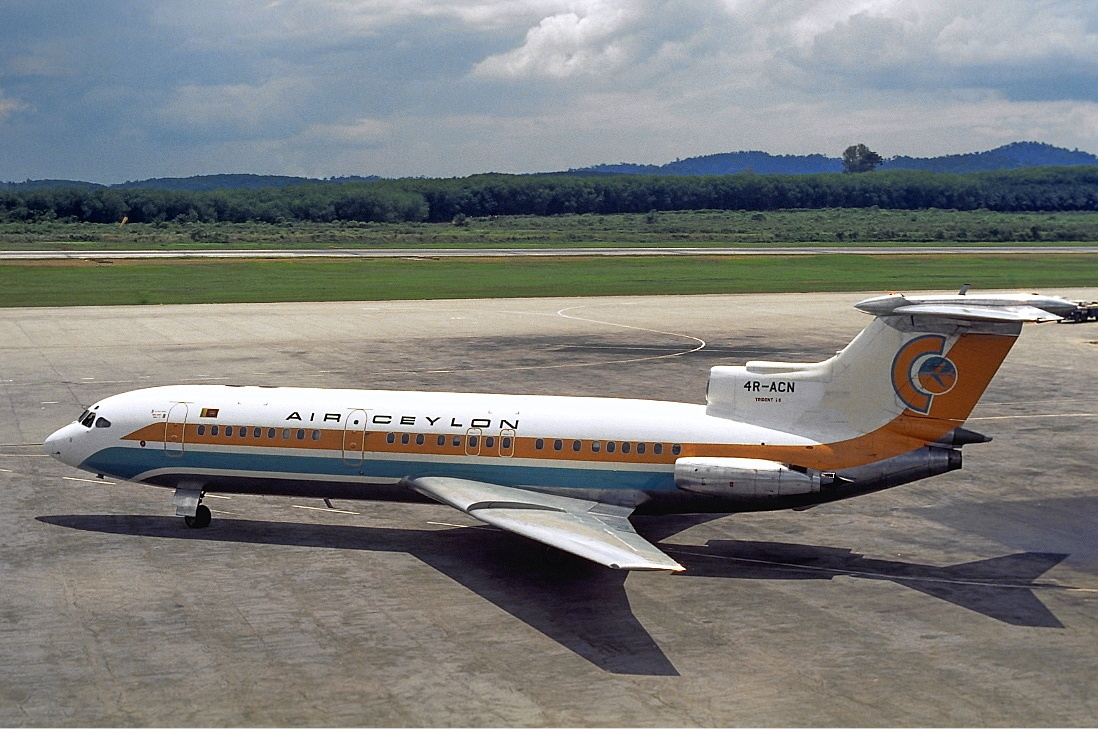
Air Ceylon Trident 1E, March 1978

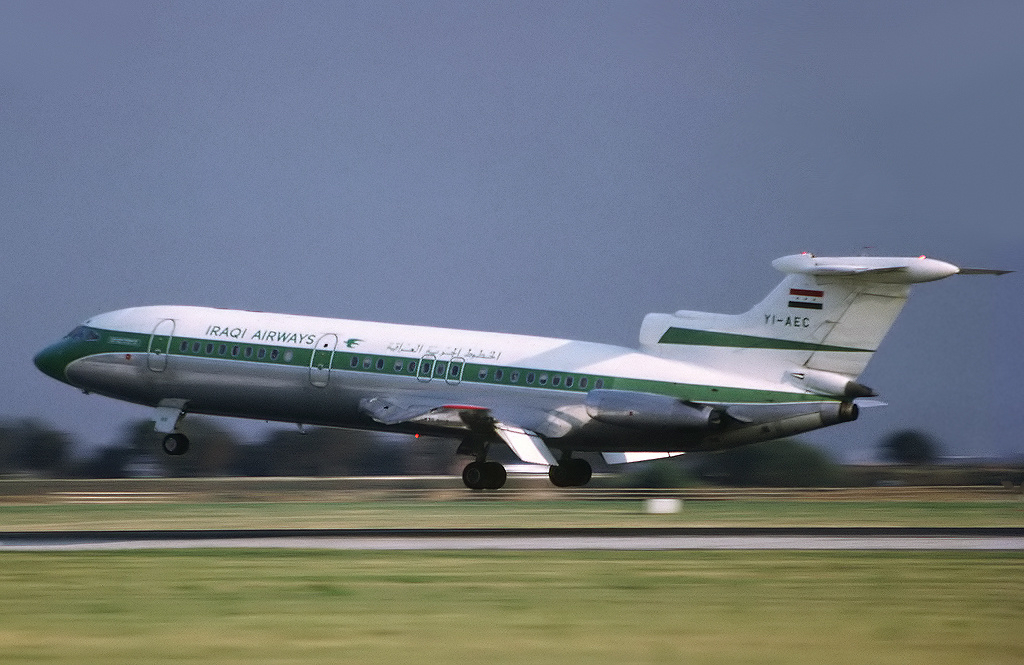
Iraqi Airways Trident 1E

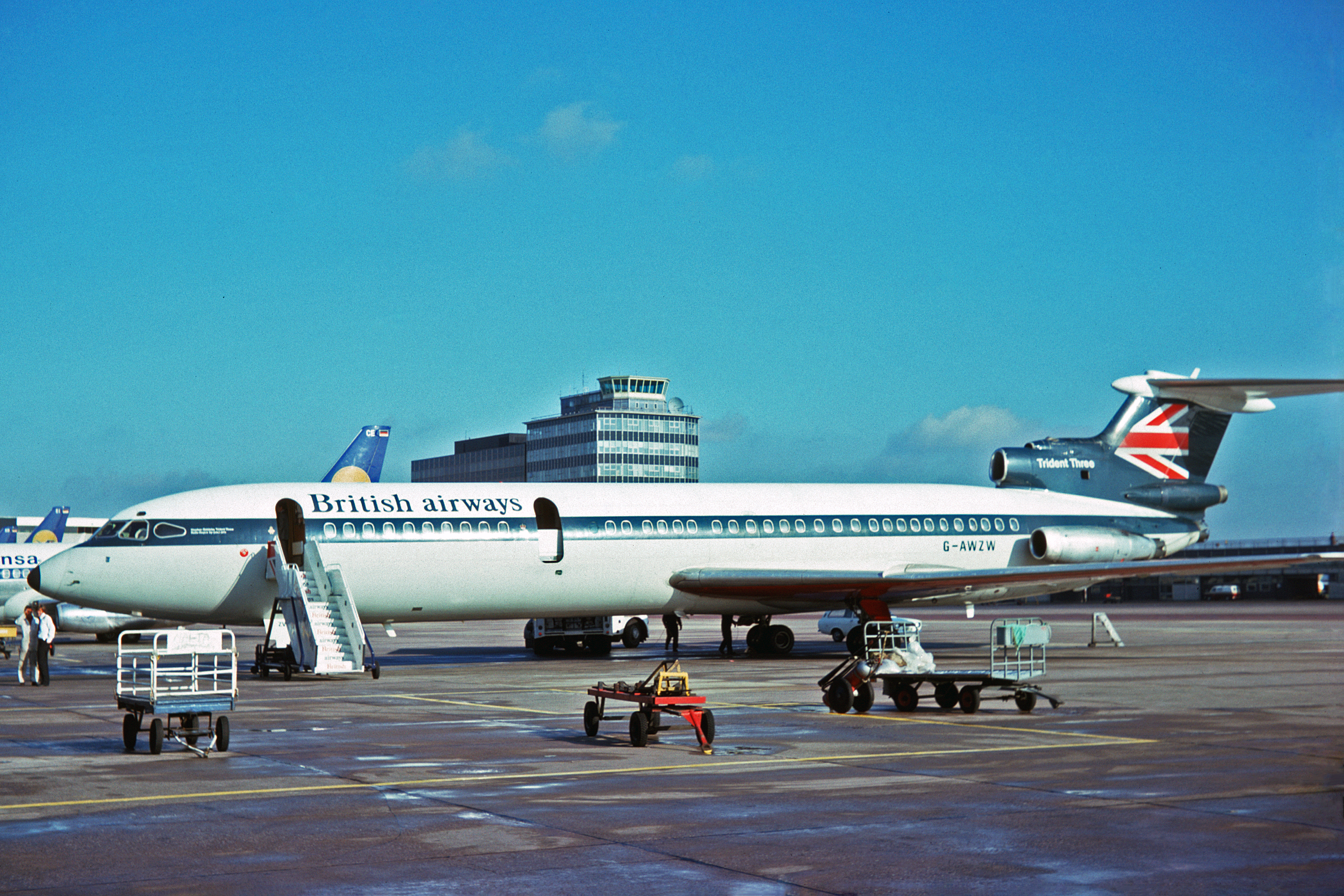
A Trident 3B in crossover BEA/British Airways livery.

=== Civil operators ===
Ceylon (now Sri Lanka)

- Air Ceylon received one of the cancelled Channel Airlines Trident 1Es in 1969, and operated it until 1978.

China

- Air China operated 5 former CAAC Tridents from 1988 to 1991.
- CAAC Airlines received 4 former PIA Trident 1Es in 1970, followed by 33 new Trident 2Es between 1972 and 1978, and a pair of Super Trident 3Bs in 1975.
- China United Airlines operated former CAAC Tridents

Cyprus

- Cyprus Airways received two Trident 2Es in 1969/70, one of which was damaged in 1972 and swapped for a similar BEA aircraft. Two former Kuwait Airlines Trident 1Es were acquired via BEA in 1973. Two aircraft were damaged beyond repair during the Turkish Invasion of Cyprus in 1974, one of which was left on the abandoned Nicosia airport and remains. The two survivors passed to British Airways in 1977.

Iraq

- Iraqi Airways received three Trident 1Es in 1965, which were operated until 1977.

Kuwait

- Kuwait Airways received three Trident 1Es in 1965/66. One was written off in 1966 and the others were sold to BEA in 1972.

Pakistan

- Pakistan International Airlines received four Trident 1Es in 1966–67, including a VIP aircraft for presidential flights. They were sold to China in 1970.

United Kingdom

- BKS/Northeast Airlines received two of the cancelled Channel Airways Trident 1Es in 1969 and acquired a third example from Channel in 1971. One was written off in 1975 and the others passed to British Airways when Northeast was taken over in 1976.
- British Airways inherited 20 Trident 1Cs, one Trident 1E, 15 Trident 2Es and 26 Trident 3Bs from British European Airways in 1974. Two more 1Es were added when Northeast Airlines was absorbed in 1976, and a 1E and a 2E (both one-time BEA machines) came from Cyprus Airways in 1977. BA retired its Trident fleet between 1974 and 1985.
- British European Airways received 23 Trident 1Cs in 1964–66, a 24th aircraft having crashed on its test flight. These were followed by 15 Trident 2E (1968–70) and 26 Trident 3Bs (1971–73). A Trident 1E was acquired from Channel Airways in 1971. One of the 2Es was swapped for a damaged Cyprus Airlines example in 1972, while two former Kuwait Airlines 1Es were operated in 1972 before passing to Cyprus Airways in 1973. Three Trident 1Cs were written off whilst in BEA ownership and the rest of the fleet passed to British Airways upon its formation in 1974.
- Channel Airways ordered five Trident 1Es but only two were delivered, in 1968. These were sold to BEA and Northeast Airways in 1971.

Zaire

- Air Charter Service of Zaire received five former British Airways Trident 3Bs in 1984–86.

=== Military operators ===
China

- People's Liberation Army Air Force operated former CAAC Tridents

Pakistan

- Pakistan Air Force was the intended operator of the presidential Trident 1E, but it was delivered to Pakistan International Airways instead.

== Accidents and incidents ==
=== Accidents with fatalities ===
- On 3 June 1966, Trident 1C registration G-ARPY entered into a deep stall while on a test flight and crashed at Felthorpe, Norfolk, killing all four crew.
- On 13 September 1971, a People's Liberation Army Air Force Trident 1E crashed in Mongolia under mysterious circumstances during an attempt by Lin Biao and his family to defect to the Soviet Union according to the official view of the PRC. Official PRC accounts claim that the Trident ran out of fuel, but others claim the plane was actually destroyed from controlled flight into terrain during radar evasion.
- On 18 June 1972, British European Airways Flight 548, a Trident 1 registered G-ARPI, entered a deep stall due to pilot error and crashed at Staines shortly after takeoff from Heathrow Airport. All 118 on board were killed in what became known as the "Staines air disaster". As of 2025, it is still the worst aviation accident to have occurred on British soil (accident, versus the Pan Am Flight 103 terrorist incident).
- On 10 September 1976, British Airways Flight 476, a Trident 3B registered G-AWZT, collided in midair with Inex-Adria Aviopromet Flight 550 a McDonnell Douglas DC-9 registered YU-AJR, over Yugoslavia, killing everyone on both aircraft. The collision of the two aircraft was attributed to an air traffic control error.
- On 14 March 1979, a CAAC Airlines Trident 2E registered B-274, crashed into a factory near Beijing, injuring at least 200. The crash was caused by an unqualified pilot who stole and flew the airliner. All 12 people on board were killed, as well as 32 people on the ground.
- On 26 April 1982, a CAAC Trident 2E registration B-266, operating as CAAC Flight 3303, crashed near Yangsuo, China killing all 112 passengers and crew.
- On 14 September 1983 a CAAC Airlines Trident 2E registered B-264 was hit by a military aircraft while on the runway at Guilin Airport, China. Eleven passengers were killed.
- On 31 August 1988, the right outboard flap of a CAAC Trident 2B operating as CAAC Flight 301 hit approach lights of runway 31 of Hong Kong's Kai Tak Airport while landing in rain and fog. The right main landing gear struck the seawall of the reclaimed land on which the runway was laid and was torn out, causing the aircraft to run off the runway and slip into the harbour. Seven people were killed.

=== Hull losses ===
- On 30 June 1966, Kuwait Airways Trident 1E registration 9K-ACG crash-landed 3 miles short of the runway at Kuwait International Airport. Fortunately there were no fatalities, and only minor injuries amongst the 83 passengers & crew. The aircraft which was just over one year old was written off.
- On 3 July 1968, whilst parked at Heathrow Terminal 1, Trident 1s G-ARPI and G-ARPT were struck by an Airspeed Ambassador G-AMAD operating BKS Air Transport Flight C.6845, which crashed whilst landing on runway 28R, thereafter departing from the runway. Trident G-ARPI was severely damaged, but repaired and returned to service, whereas G-ARPT was written off. G-ARPI later crashed in 1972.
- On 15 September 1975 Trident 1E G-AVYD was damaged beyond repair & written off at Bilbao after aborting its take-off at or close to V_{1}, and failing to stop on the remaining length of (wet) runway. It was operating British Airways (Northeast Airlines) flight NS552 with 110 passengers and 7 crew, all of whom evacuated the aircraft safely.

=== Incidents ===
- On 23 July 1974, a British Airways Trident suffered a bombing attempt while over the sea. It diverted to Manchester Airport.
- On 5 May 1983, CAAC Flight 296 was hijacked, leading to establishment of diplomatic relations between the PRC and ROK.

== Aircraft on display ==
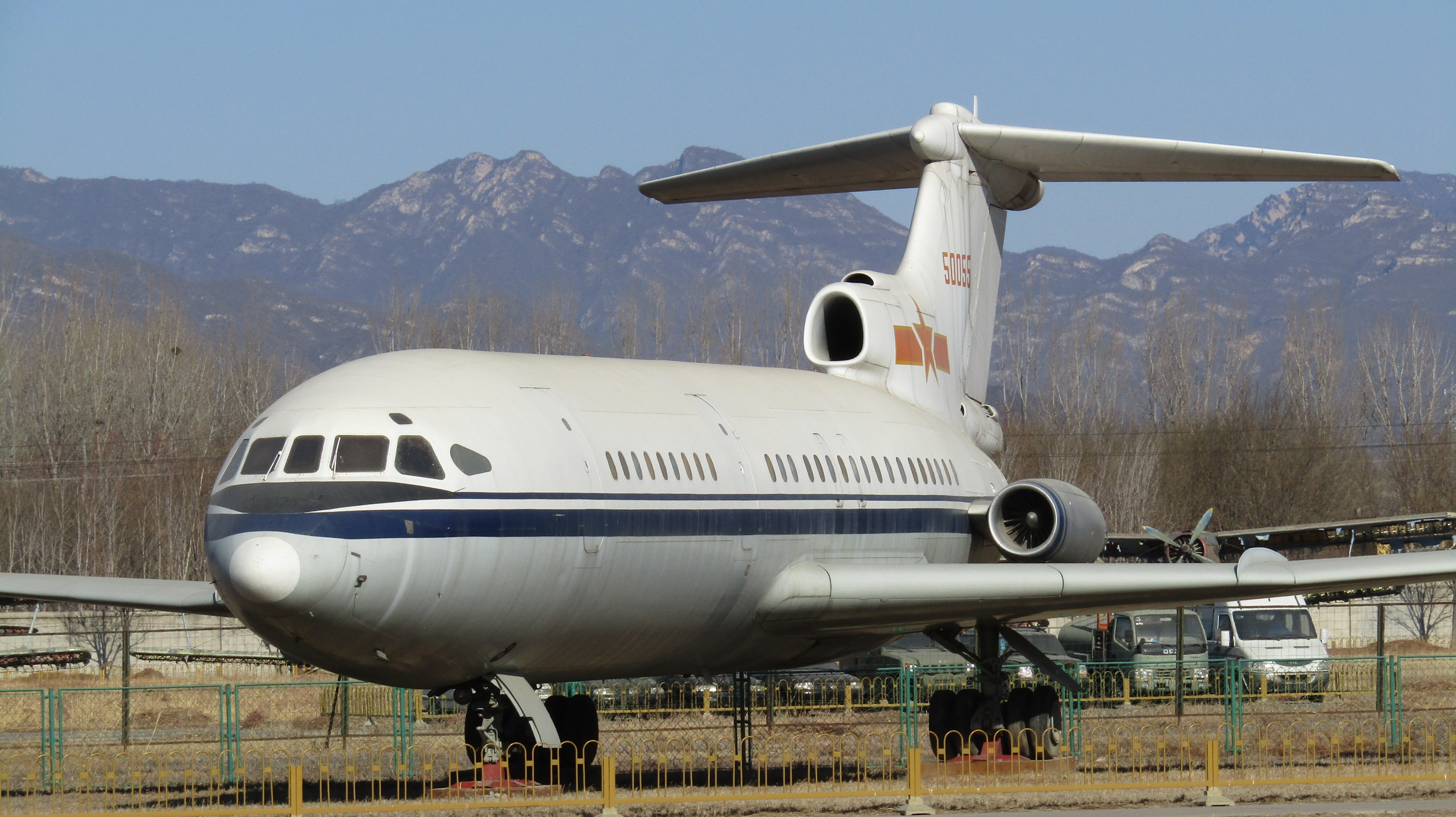
Trident 2 at China Aviation Museum, Beijing

- Trident 1C G-ARPH (Nose Section) at Museum of Flight East Fortune Scotland.
- Trident 1C G-ARPO at North East Land, Sea and Air Museums Sunderland, UK in Northeast Airlines (UK) livery.
- Trident 1C G-ARPP (Nose Section) at Solway Aviation Museum Carlisle Airport UK.
- Trident 1E B-2207 at Civil Aviation Museum, Beijing, China.
- Trident 1E 50051 at Beijing Air And Space Museum.
- Trident 2E 50055 at the Military Museum of the Chinese People's Revolution, Beijing, China.
- Trident 2E 50057 at Zhuhai.

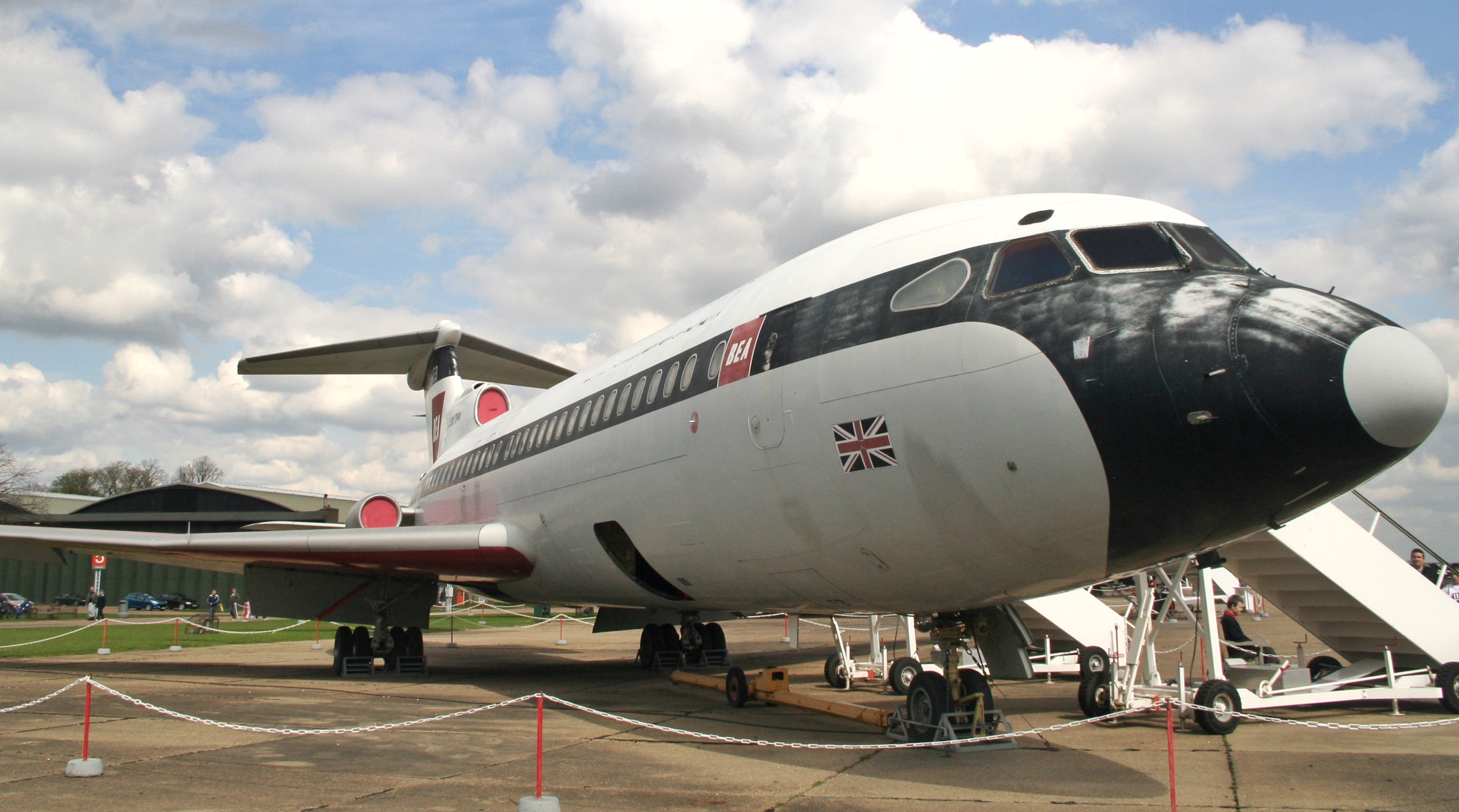
Trident 2E G-AVFB at Imperial War Museum Duxford

- Trident 2E G-AVFB at Imperial War Museum Duxford, Duxford, Cambridgeshire, UK; on display in British European Airways livery.
- Trident 2E G-AVFH (Forward Fuselage Section) at the De Havilland Museum Hertfordshire.
- Trident 2E G-AVFM (Nose Section) at South Wales Aviation Museum St Athan Wales.
- Trident 2E 5B-DAB abandoned at the closed Nicosia International Airport within the UN Buffer Zone. The aircraft has remained on the tarmac since being damaged during the Turkish invasion of Cyprus in 1974.
- Trident 3B G-AWZI (Nose Section) at Farnborough Air Sciences Trust Museum.
- Trident 3B G-AWZJ (Forward Fuselage Section) Dumfries and Galloway Aviation Museum.
- Trident 3B G-AWZK at Runway Visitor Park at Manchester Airport, Manchester, UK; moved from Heathrow in September 2005 after fund raising campaign by The Trident Preservation Society and Neil Lomax on display in British European Airways livery.
- Trident 3B G-AWZM at the Science Museum's National Collections Centre exhibit store at Wroughton, Wiltshire, UK; preserved in British Airways 'Negus' livery.
- Trident 3B G-AWZP (Nose Section) at the De Havilland Museum Hertfordshire.
- Trident 3B G-AWZU (Nose Section) at Jet Age Museum Gloucester.

== Specifications ==
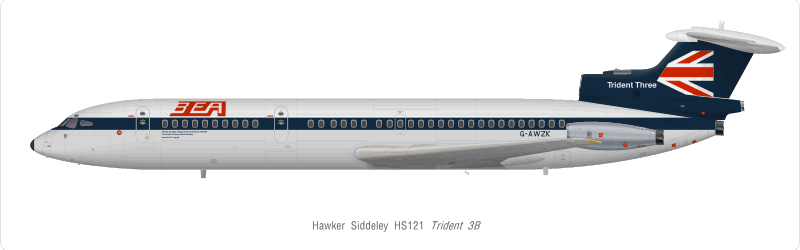
Hawker Siddeley Trident 3B side view

Variant comparison
| Variant | Trident 1/1C | Trident 1E | Trident 2E | Trident 3B |
|---|---|---|---|---|
| Cockpit crew | Three (Captain, First Officer, and Flight Engineer) | | | |
| Typical seats | 101 seats | 108 seats | 115 seats | 180 seats |
| Length | 114 ft 9 in (34.98 m) | | | 131 ft 2 in (39.98 m) |
| Wingspan | 89 ft 10 in (27.38 m) | 95 ft (29 m) | 98 ft (30 m) | |
| Wing area | 1,358 ft^{2} (126.2 m^{2}) | 1,415 ft^{2} (131.5 m^{2}) | 1,462 ft^{2} (135.8 m^{2}) | |
| Wingsweep | 35 degrees | | | |
| Height | 27 ft 0 in (8.23 m) | | | 28 ft 3 in (8.61 m) |
| Max. cabin width | 11 ft 3.5 in (3.442 m) | | | |
| Typical OEW | 66,700 lb (30.3 t); 1C: 67,200 lb (30.5 t) | 70,000 lb (31.8 t) | 73,200 lb (33.2 t) | 83,000 lb (37.6 t) |
| MTOW | 107,000 lb (48.5 t); 1C: 115,000 lb (52.2 t) | 128,000 lb (58.1 t) | 142,500 lb (64.6 t) | 150,000 lb (68.0 t) |
| Fuel capacity | 3,840 imp gal (17,500 L; 4,610 US gal); 1C: 4,840 imp gal (22,000 L; 5,810 US gal) | 5,440 imp gal (24,700 L; 6,530 US gal) | 5,774 imp gal (26,250 L; 6,934 US gal) | 5,440 imp gal (24,700 L; 6,530 US gal) |
| Engines | 3 x Spey RB163-1 Mk505-5 | 3 x Spey RB163-25 Mk511-5 | 3 x Spey RB.163-25 Mk512-5 | 3 x Spey RB.163-25 Mk512-5 1 x RB.162-86 |
| Thrust | 3 x 10,400 lbf (46 kN) | 3 x 11,400 lbf (51 kN) | 3 x 11,960 lbf (53.2 kN) | 3 x 11,960 lbf (53.2 kN) 1 x (5,250) lbf (23.4 kN) |
| FL300 cruise | Mach 0.86 – 506 kn (582 mph; 937 km/h) | | | Mach 0.84 – 495 kn (570 mph; 917 km/h) |
| Ceiling | 35,000 ft (11,000 m) | | | |
| Range | 1,350 mi (1,170 nmi; 2,170 km); 1C: 2,025 mi (1,760 nmi; 3,260 km) | 2,200 mi (1,910 nmi; 3,540 km) | 2,700 mi (2,350 nmi; 4,350 km) | 2,235 mi (1,940 nmi; 3,600 km) |

== See also ==
Aircraft of comparable role, configuration, and era

- Boeing 727
- McDonnell Douglas DC-9
- Tupolev Tu-154

Related lists

- List of civil aircraft
- List of jet airliners

== Sources ==
- Green, William. The Observer's Book of Aircraft. London: Frederick Warne & Co. Ltd., 1976. ISBN 0-7232-1553-7.
- Gunn, John. Contested skies: Trans-Australian Airlines, Australian Airlines, 1946–1992. St Lucia, Queensland, Australia: University of Queensland Press, 1999. ISBN 0-7022-3073-1.
- Jackson, A.J. British Civil Aircraft since 1919, Volume 2. London: Putnam, 1973. ISBN 0-370-10010-7.
- Jerram, Michael and Cliff Barnet. Illustrated International Aircraft Guide 6: General Aviation. London: Phoebus Publishing Co., 1981. No ISBN.
- Munson, Kenneth. Civil Airliners since 1946. London: Blandford Press, 1967.
- Staniland, Martin. Government Birds: Air Transport and the State in Western Europe. Lanham, Maryland: Rowman & Littlefield, 2003. ISBN 0-7425-0124-8.
- Taylor, Michael J.H., ed. Jane's Encyclopedia of Aviation, Vol. 2. Danbury, Connecticut: Grolier Educational Corporation, 1980. ISBN 0-7106-0710-5.
- Varley, Helen, ed. The Air Traveller's Handbook: The Complete Guide to Air Travel, Airplanes and Airports. New York: Simon & Schuster/Fireside, 1978. ISBN 0-671-24393-4.
- Winchester, Jim, ed. "Hawker Siddeley Trident". Civil Aircraft. Kent, UK: The Grange, 2004. ISBN 1-84013-642-1.
- Wood, Derek. Project Cancelled. Macdonald and Jane's Publishers, 1975. ISBN 0-356-08109-5.
