= Northeast Airlines (UK) =

1951–1976 British regional airline

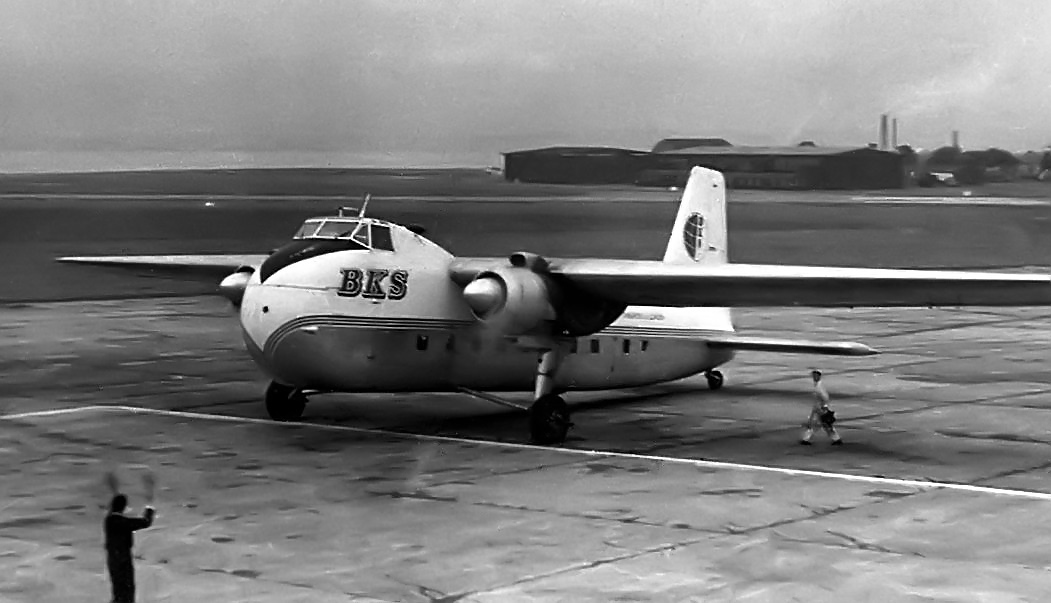
- Bristol Freighter at Liverpool in 1961
| IATA | ICAO | Call sign |
|---|---|---|
| NS | NS | NORJET |
- Founded: February 1952 (as B.K.S. Aero Charter)
- Ceased operations: 31 March 1976 (merged into British Airways)
- Operating bases: Leeds/Bradford; Newcastle upon Tyne
- Parent company: British Air Services
- Headquarters: Newcastle upon Tyne, England

Northeast Airlines (NEA) – known as BKS Air Transport until 1970 – was an airline based in the United Kingdom that operated from 1952 until 1976, when its operations and fleet merged into British Airways.

== History ==
=== BKS ===
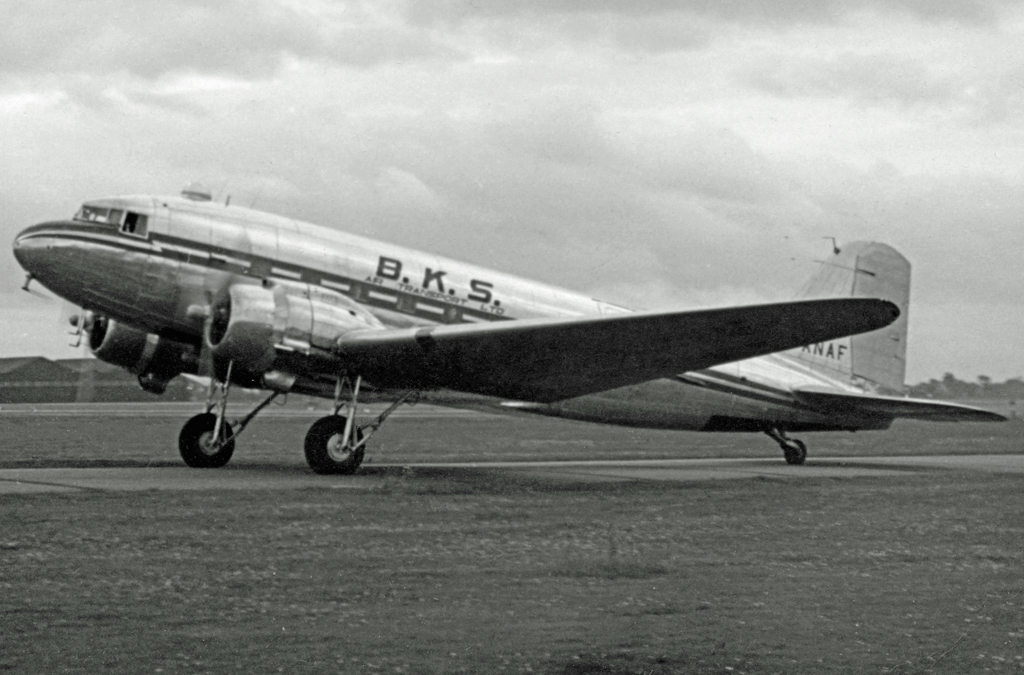
BKS Air Transport Douglas C-47 wearing the initial all-metallic scheme at Manchester Airport in 1954

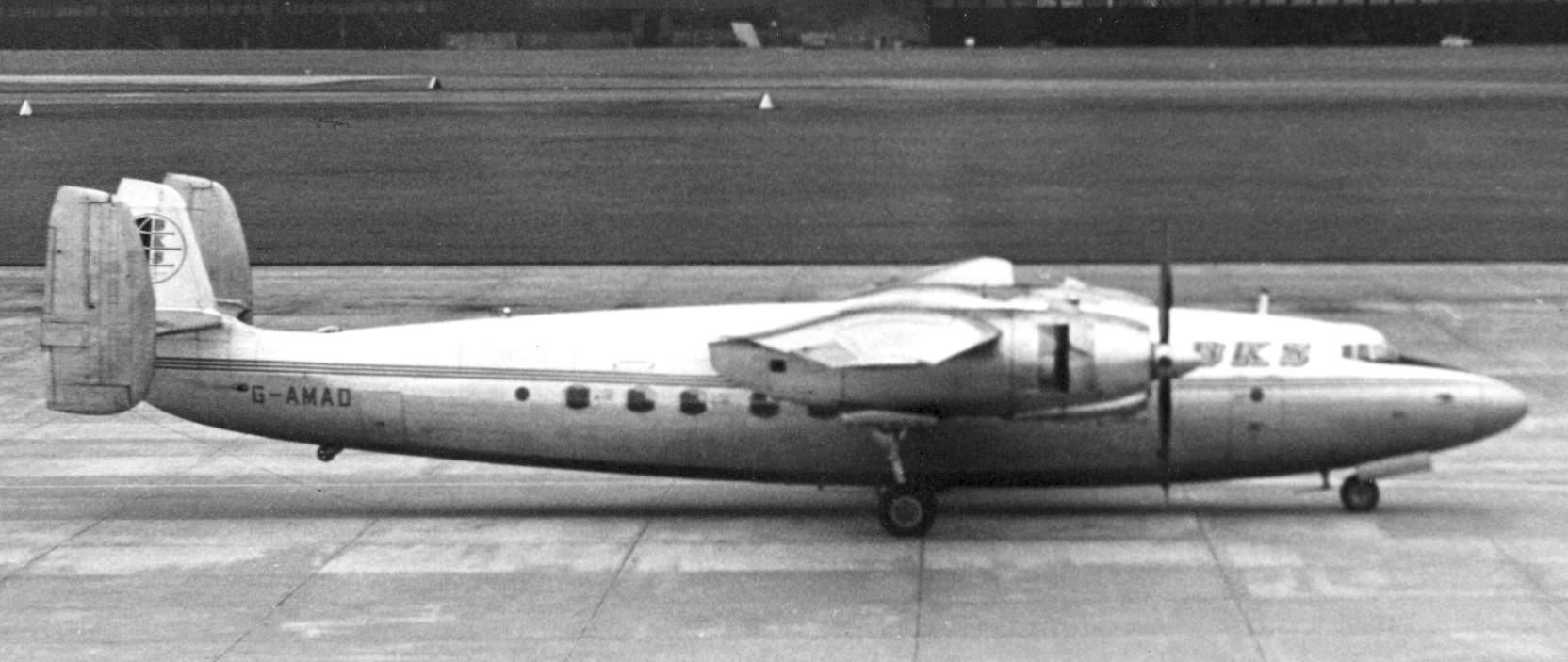
BKS Air Transport Airspeed Ambassador G-AMAD in 1965

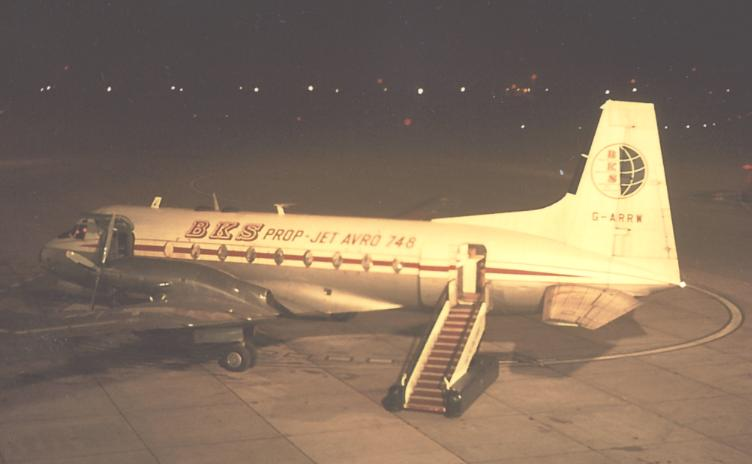
BKS HS748 at Manchester in September 1964 wearing Avro 748 Jetprop titles

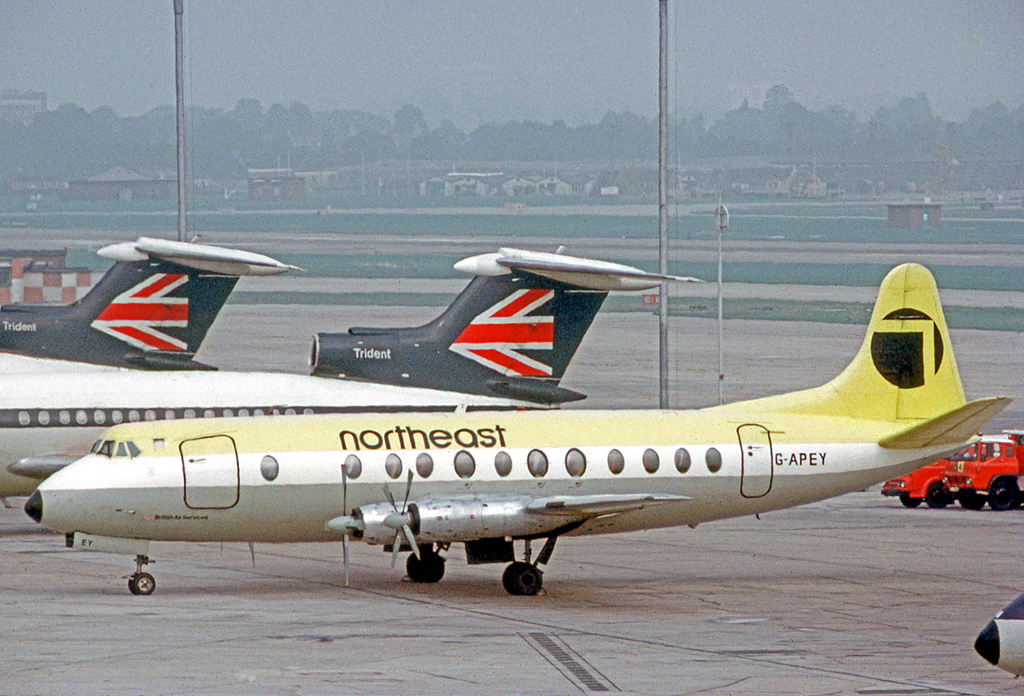
Northeast Airlines Vickers Viscount 806 at London Heathrow Airport in 1971.

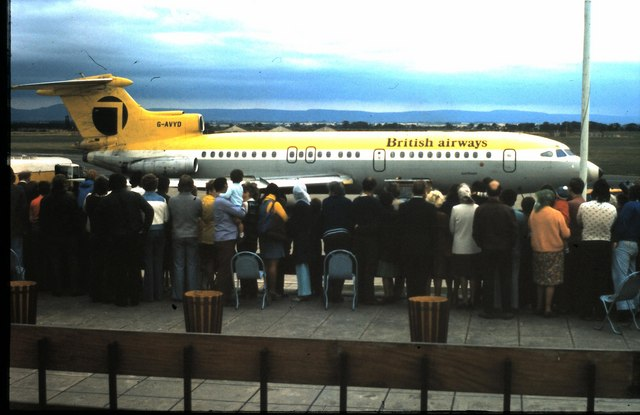
Northeast Airlines Hawker Siddeley Trident G-AVYD at Teesside Airport in 1974, now in British Airways/Northeast Airlines hybrid livery.

The airline began operating in February 1952 from its base at Southend Airport as BKS Aero Charter flying a Douglas C-47 Dakota (BKS were the founders' initials – James Barnby, T D 'Mike' Keegan and Cyril Stevens.)

After less than a month the C-47 was sold (to Iberia Airlines), allowing BKS to buy two further ex-RAF Dakotas. For a couple of years BKS flew charters and freight, until 1953 when it had permission for scheduled services between Newcastle, the Isle of Man and Jersey. The Dakotas continued with BKS until the last of eight was sold in 1967. The airline's name changed to BKS Air Transport at the end of 1953.

Three Vickers VC.1 Vikings were acquired in 1955 to operate to Málaga. The next aircraft type was the pressurised Airspeed Ambassador. It operated from 1957 and enabled longer scheduled services to Basel, Belfast, Bilbao, Dublin and Santander.

The network grew with more scheduled flights, including Newcastle to London. In 1958 the Bristol 170 Freighter was added, followed by the Vickers Viscount in 1961. Further expansion in and out of London saw the introduction of the Hawker Siddeley HS 748 in 1962 and the Bristol Britannia in 1964.

By the mid-1960s, London Heathrow had become BKS's busiest base with scheduled flights to Leeds/Bradford, Teesside and Newcastle, as well as international services to Bilbao, Biarritz, and Bordeaux.

The first jet aircraft were two Hawker Siddeley Tridents, acquired in April 1969. These served the Newcastle-Heathrow route as well as inclusive tour charters from Newcastle and London to Mediterranean destinations. Two further Tridents were acquired later.

BKS and Cambrian Airways formed the British Air Services group in 1967. British Air Services was a holding company 70 per cent owned by British European Airways and 30 per cent by the former shareholders of BKS and Cambrian.

=== Northeast Airlines ===
The airline's name changed to Northeast Airlines on 1 November 1970. In July 1973, the airline became part of the British Airways group. By 1976 Northeast had fully integrated into British Airways. The last Northeast flights operated on 31 March 1976.

== Historical fleet ==
- Airspeed Ambassador (five)
- Bristol Britannia (four)
- Bristol 170 Freighter (one)
- Douglas C-47 Dakota (eight)
- Hawker Siddeley HS 748 (five)
- Hawker Siddeley HS.121 Trident (four)
- Vickers VC.1 Viking (three)
- Vickers Viscount 700/800 (twelve)

== Accidents and incidents ==
- On 3 July 1968, BKS Air Transport Flight C.6845 crashed at London Heathrow Airport when a flap actuating rod failed due to metal fatigue. Six of the eight on board and eight horses being transported were killed. Two Hawker Siddeley Tridents were hit by the crashing Ambassador.
- On 17 October 1961, a BKS Dakota (G-AMVC) en route from Yeadon to Crosby, crashed on Croglin Fell in the North Pennines in strong winds, heavy rain and poor visibility. All four crew (the only occupants) were killed.

== See also ==
- List of defunct airlines of the United Kingdom
