= Guilin Qifengling Airport =

Military airport in Guilin, Guangxi, China

Guilin Qifengling Airport 桂林奇峰岭机场
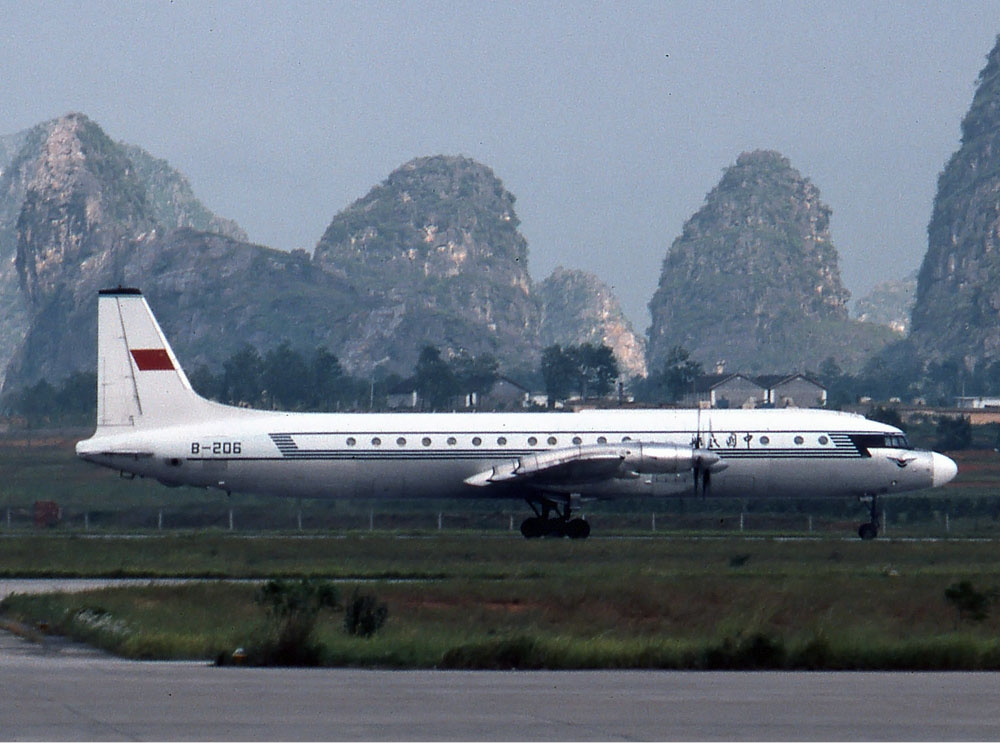
- An Ilyushin Il-18 of the CAAC at the airport in 1984
- IATA: KWL; ICAO: ZGKL

Summary
- Airport type: Military
- Serves: Guilin, Guangxi
- Location: Qifeng, Yanshan District, Guilin, Guangxi, China
- Opened: 1958 (civil)
- Passenger services ceased: 1 October 1996
- Built: 1942 (military)
- Coordinates: 25°11′40″N 110°19′11″E

Map
- Location in Guangxi

Runways
Direction	Length		Surface
Direction	m	ft	Surface
18/36	2,300	7,546	Asphalt

Guilin Qifengling Airport
- Simplified Chinese: 桂林奇峰岭机场
- Traditional Chinese: 桂林奇峰嶺機場
Transcriptions
Standard Mandarin
- Hanyu Pinyin: Guìlín jīfēnglǐng jīchǎng

Guilin Qifengling Airport is a military airport in Guilin, Guangxi, China. Built in 1958, the airport originally served all commercial traffic to Guilin. It was poorly equipped to handle the rapid increase in tourism to the city during the 1990s. As a result, Guilin Liangjiang International Airport was opened in 1996 and all commercial flights shifted to it.

== History ==
During World War II, the airport was known as Kweilin Airfield and was used by the United States Army Air Forces Fourteenth Air Force as part of the China Defensive Campaign (1942–45). The airfield is also known as Lijiacun Aifield (李家村机场) in Chinese to distinguish other airfield in the city. Kweilin was the headquarters of the 23d Fighter Group, the "Flying Tigers" during late 1943 and through most of 1944 and also its command and control unit, the 68th Composite Wing. The unit flew P-40 Warhawk and later P-51 Mustang fighter bombers from the airport, attacking Japanese targets and supporting Chinese army units. In support of the combat units, Kweilin was also the home of the 8th Reconnaissance Group, which operated unarmed P-38 Lightning aircraft equipped with an array of mapping cameras to gather intelligence over Japanese-held areas. The Flying Tigers departed the base in late 1944, being replaced by elements of the Chinese-American Composite Wing (CACW), which flew B-25 Mitchell and P-51 Mustang fighters from the airport on combat missions until the end of the war in September 1945. The Americans closed their facilities after the war ended in September 1945.

Qifengling Airport was rebuilt in 1958, serving both civil and military air traffic. During the 1990s, tourism to Guilin rose significantly. The majority of tourists came from Hong Kong, Macau and Taiwan and travelled to Guilin by air. In 1982, Qifengling Airport received 471,200 passengers; in 1991, the airport handled 1,456,000 passengers and was serving 16 airlines. The runway, small terminal, and apron of the airport grew inadequate due to this increased activity. Work on a new airport started in 1993 and was completed in 1996. Commercial flights shifted to the new Liangjiang International Airport upon its opening in October 1996.

== Airfield ==
Qifengling Airport has one runway, 18/36, with dimensions 2,300 by 45 metres (7,546 ft × 148 ft).

== Accidents and incidents ==
- On 26 April 1982, a Hawker Siddeley Trident 2E operating CAAC Flight 3303 was on approach to Qifengling Airport when it crashed into a mountain in Gongcheng Yao Autonomous County, about 60 kilometres (37 mi) southeast of Guilin. All 112 passengers and crew on board were killed.
- On 14 September 1983, a CAAC Hawker Siddeley Trident 2E was taxiing onto the runway at Qifengling Airport when a Harbin H-5 belonging to the Chinese military crashed into it, leaving a hole in the front right side of the Trident and killing 11 of its passengers.
- On 24 November 1992, a Boeing 737-300 operating China Southern Airlines Flight 3943 crashed into a mountain about 24 kilometres (15 mi) form Guilin while it was approaching Qifengling Airport. The incident killed all 141 occupants of the aircraft, and was the worst plane crash to occur within Southern China.
