= BKS Air Transport Flight C.6845 =

1968 plane crash in London, England

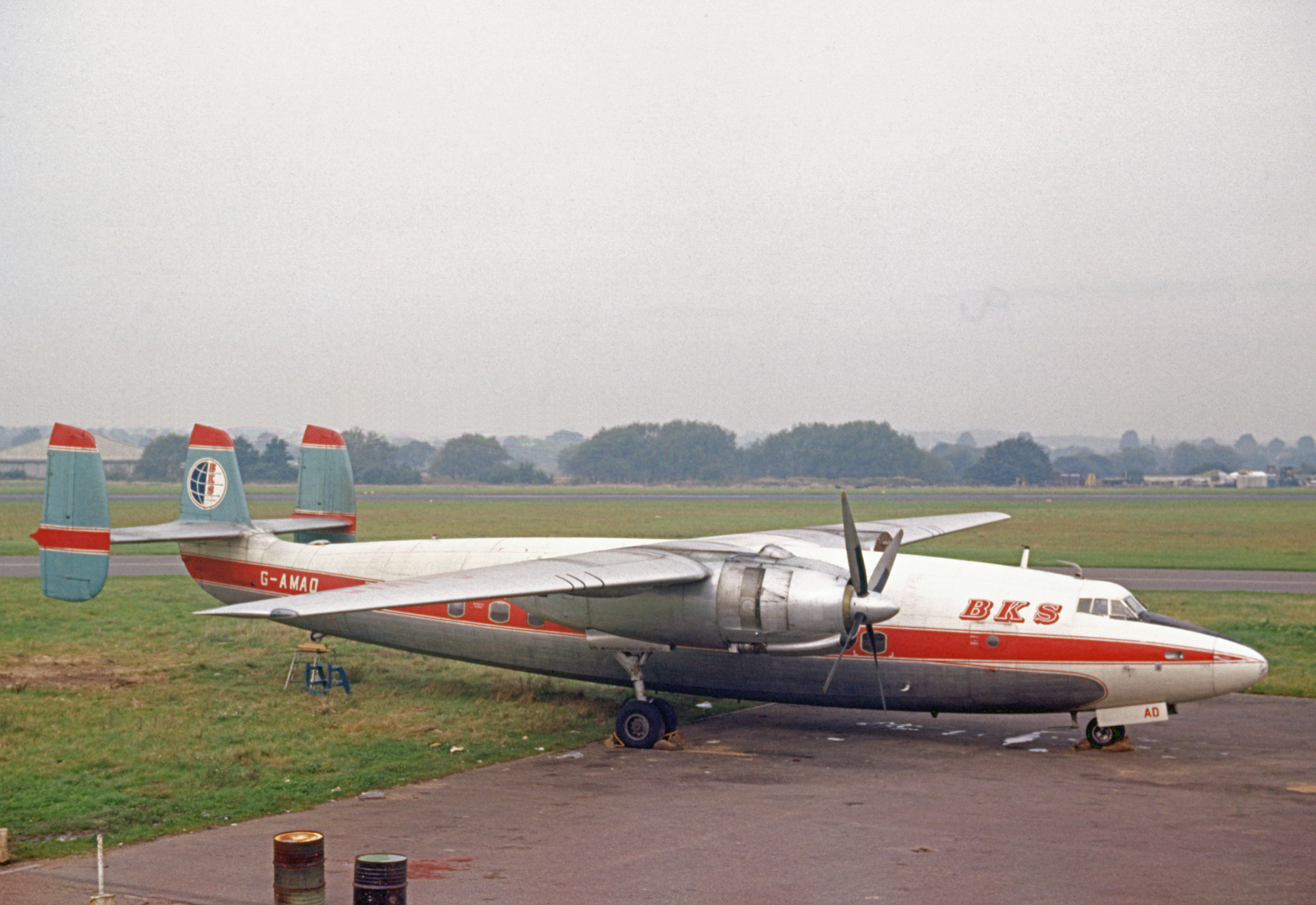
- G-AMAD, the Airspeed Ambassador involved, seen in 1966

Accident
- Date: 3 July 1968
- Summary: Mechanical failure caused by metal fatigue
- Site: Heathrow Airport, England; 51.4734°N 0.4501°W

Aircraft
- Aircraft type: Airspeed Ambassador
- Operator: BKS Air Transport
- Registration: G-AMAD
- Occupants: 8
- Passengers: 5
- Crew: 3
- Fatalities: 6
- Survivors: 2

On 3 July 1968, BKS Air Transport Flight C.6845, an Airspeed Ambassador registration G-AMAD of BKS Air Transport crashed at Heathrow Airport, damaging two parked Trident airliners as it cartwheeled into the incomplete Heathrow Terminal 1, then under construction. Six of the eight people on board the Ambassador were killed, along with the eight racehorses being transported on it. The crash was blamed on the failure of a flap-operating rod due to metal fatigue, resulting in asymmetrical lift.

== Accident ==
The Ambassador, construction number 5211, had previously been British European Airways' Sir Francis Drake. It had recently been converted to a "horsebox" transport and was on a flight from Deauville, France, to Heathrow Airport. Flight C.6845 was transporting eight racehorses belonging to businessman William Hill together with five grooms. As the aircraft was landing on Heathrow's runway 28R the left wing dropped, and the wing tip and left landing gear touched the grass adjacent to the runway. The crew tried to increase power to go-around and climb away, but the bank angle increased. The aircraft hit two parked empty British European Airways Hawker Siddeley Tridents, knocking the tail fin off one (G-ARPI) and slicing off the entire tail section of the other (G-ARPT). The Ambassador cartwheeled following the impact and slid upside down coming up against the ground floor of the terminal building where there was an explosion.

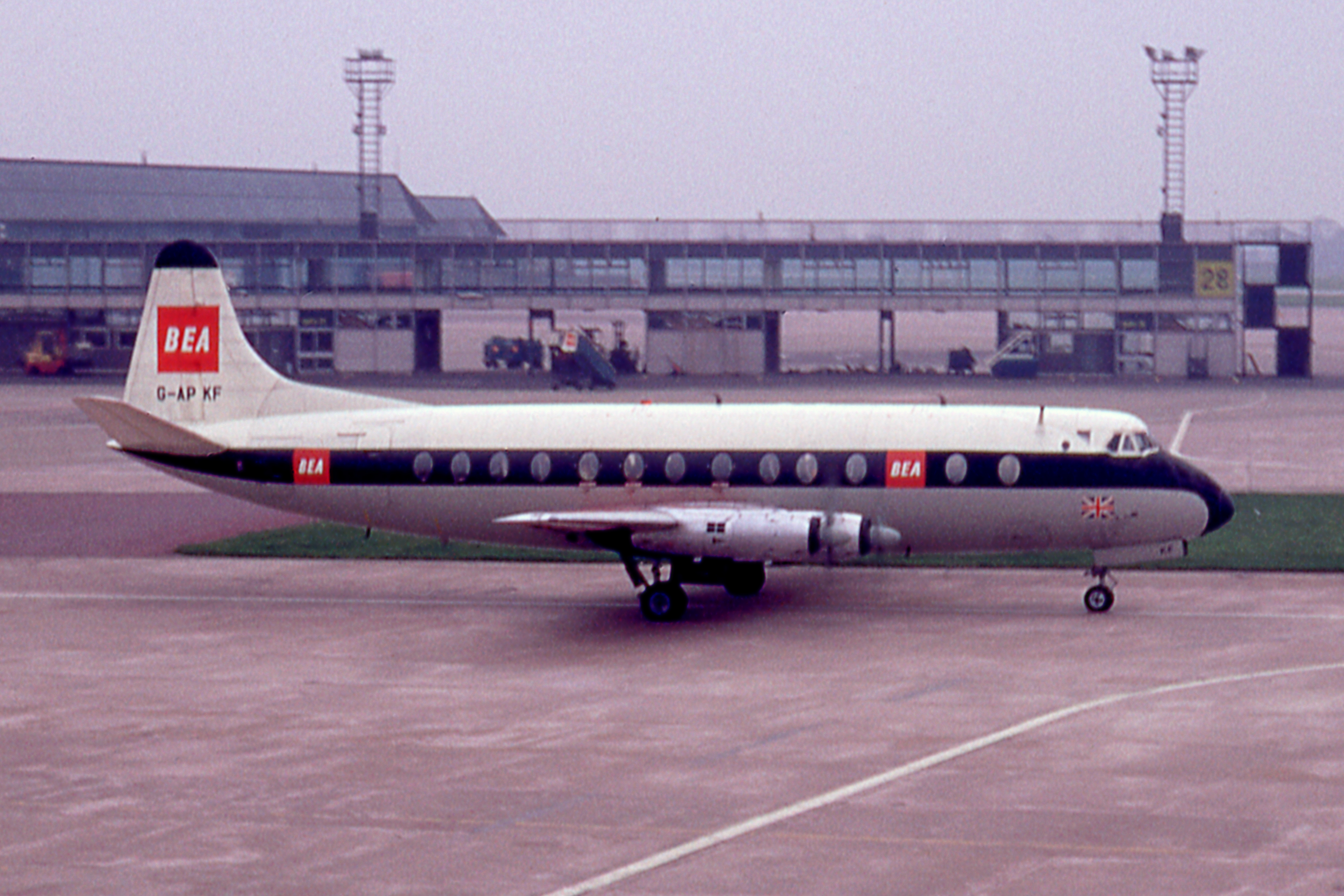
G-APKF, one of the aircraft involved in the accident

Six people on board the Ambassador died, including the flight crew and three of five grooms, along with all eight horses. The other two grooms were seriously injured as were two people on the ground. A further 27 people on the ground received slight injuries.

Of the two Trident aircraft, G-ARPT was damaged beyond economic repair and G-ARPI was subsequently repaired. G-ARPI was involved in an accident in 1972 resulting in the deaths of 118 people and becoming the deadliest non-terrorist aviation accident in the UK. A Viscount (G-APKF) received slight damage. The Viscount was also repaired but later too involved in a fatal hull-loss accident in Cambodia as XW-TDN in 1975.

All other Ambassadors were grounded pending the result of an inquiry. The starboard rod from the aircraft was tested and found satisfactory but rods from some other Ambassadors showed signs of cracking and when tested failed in a similar manner to G-AMAD's port rod. The rods on aircraft were strengthened and shown to be capable of 37,000 hours flight time.

== Probable cause ==
The port (left) flap operating rod had failed due to metal fatigue. While the mechanism had failed, the compensating mechanism between the two sets of flaps remained intact. The port flaps had retracted but the compensator caused the starboard ones to extend further. The resulting asymmetry of lift resulted in the roll to port.

The pilot probably tried to overshoot and set the flaps to the correct 10 degrees, but due to the mechanism design this was not sufficient to cause the starboard flaps to retract (which would have taken 25 seconds in any event). The Department of Transport report concluded that whatever the pilot's actions, it was "doubtful" whether an accident could have been avoided.

After the accident all Ambassadors were fitted with steel reinforcements to the flap operating rods.

== See also ==
- List of accidents and incidents involving commercial aircraft
- Air Vanuatu Flight 241, in which an aircraft departed the runway and collided with two parked aircraft
- British European Airways Flight 548, aviation incident in which G-ARPI was also involved
