= 1983 Guilin Airport collision =

Fatal 1983 aviation accident in Guilin, Guangxi, China

Coordinates: 25.1939°N 110.3203°E

1983 Guilin Airport collision CAAC Flight 264 · People's Liberation Army Air Force of China Harbin H-5
Accident
- Date: 14 September 1983
- Summary: Runway incursion
- Site: Guilin Qifengling Airport, China
- Total fatalities: 11
- Total injuries: 27
- Total survivors: at least 95

First aircraft
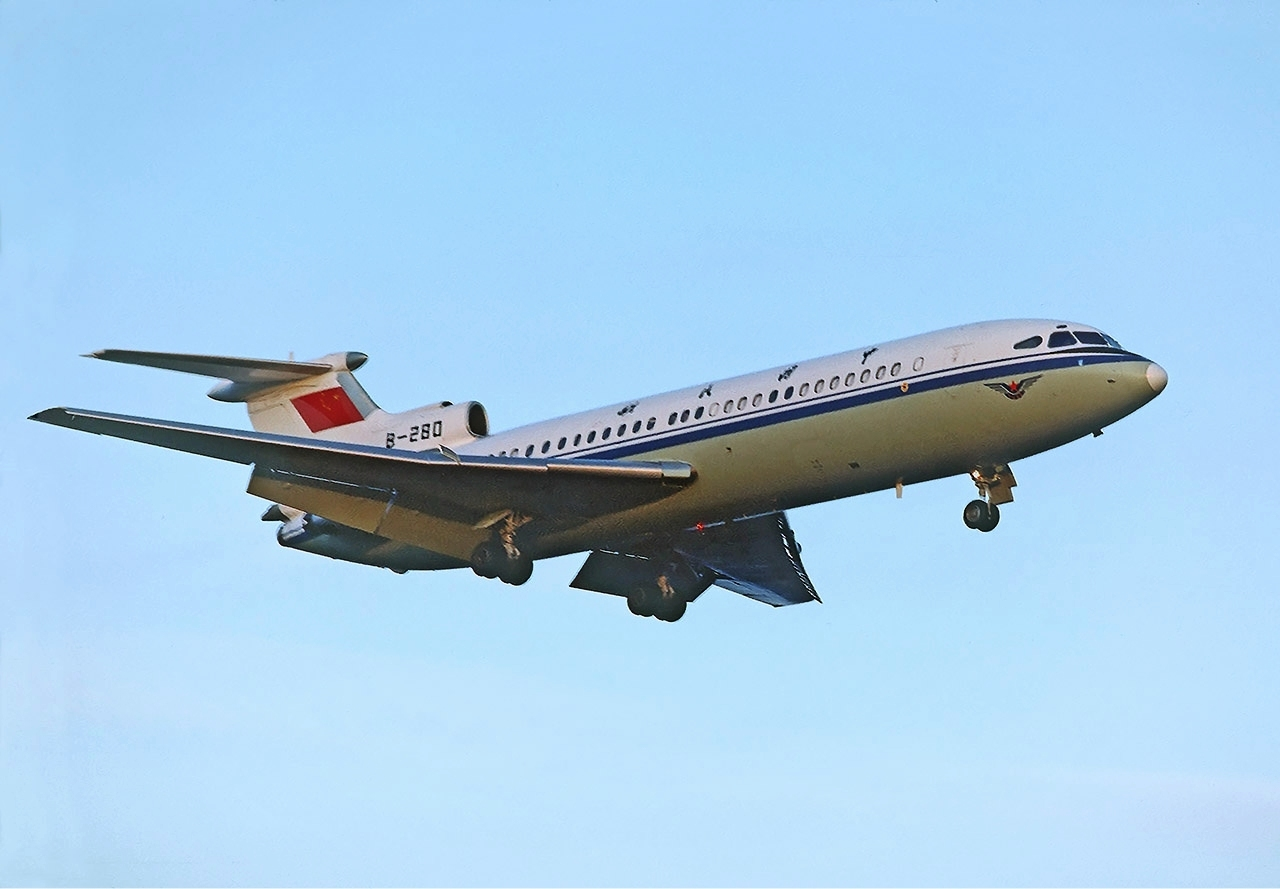
- A CAAC trident similar to the accident aircraft
- Type: Hawker Siddeley Trident 2E
- Operator: CAAC Airlines
- Registration: B-264
- Flight origin: Guilin Qifengling Airport, China
- Destination: Beijing Capital International Airport (PEK/ZBAA)
- Occupants: 106
- Passengers: 100
- Crew: 6
- Fatalities: 11
- Injuries: 21
- Survivors: 95

Second aircraft
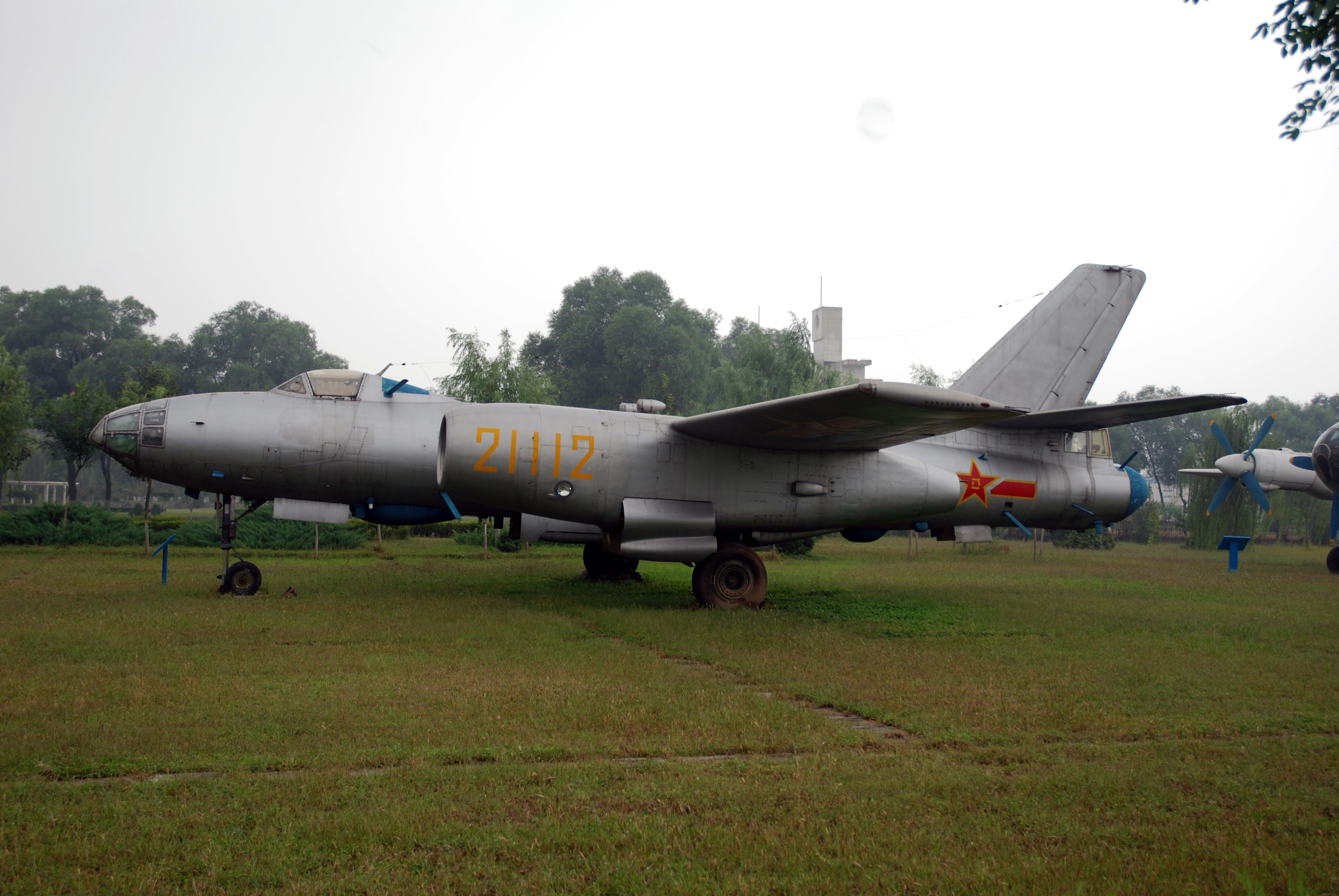
- Type: Harbin H-5
- Operator: People's Liberation Army Air Force (PLAAF)
- Registration: Unknown

The 1983 Guilin Airport collision was a ground collision which occurred on 12 September 1983 between a People's Liberation Army Air Force (PLAAF) Harbin H-5 bomber and a CAAC Hawker-Siddeley Trident operating as Flight 264 at the military – civilian Guilin Qifengling Airport, killing 11 passengers and injuring 27 onboard the Trident. The fate of the crew of the Harbin H-5 is unknown.

== Background ==
=== CAAC Flight 264 ===
The aircraft operating as flight 264 was an 8 year old Hawker Siddeley HS-121 Trident 2E, equipped with three Rolls-Royce Spey 512 engines. The aircraft was manufactured in 1975 with the MSN being 2169, being registered as B-264.

== Accident ==
At 9:34 local time, a Harbin H-5 collided with a Hawker-Siddeley Trident operating as CAAC Flight 264 at the Guilin Qifengling Airport. The Trident was taxiing for take-off when it was struck by the Harbin H-5, ripping a large hole in the forward fuselage of the Trident. On board the Trident, which was bound for Beijing, were 100 passengers and 6 crew; of the 106 on board 11 passengers died and 21 were injured. It was not reported what was the fate of the H-5's crew.

== See also ==
- Tenerife airport disaster, the deadliest runway incursion in history
