= China Southern Airlines Flight 3943 =

1992 aviation accident

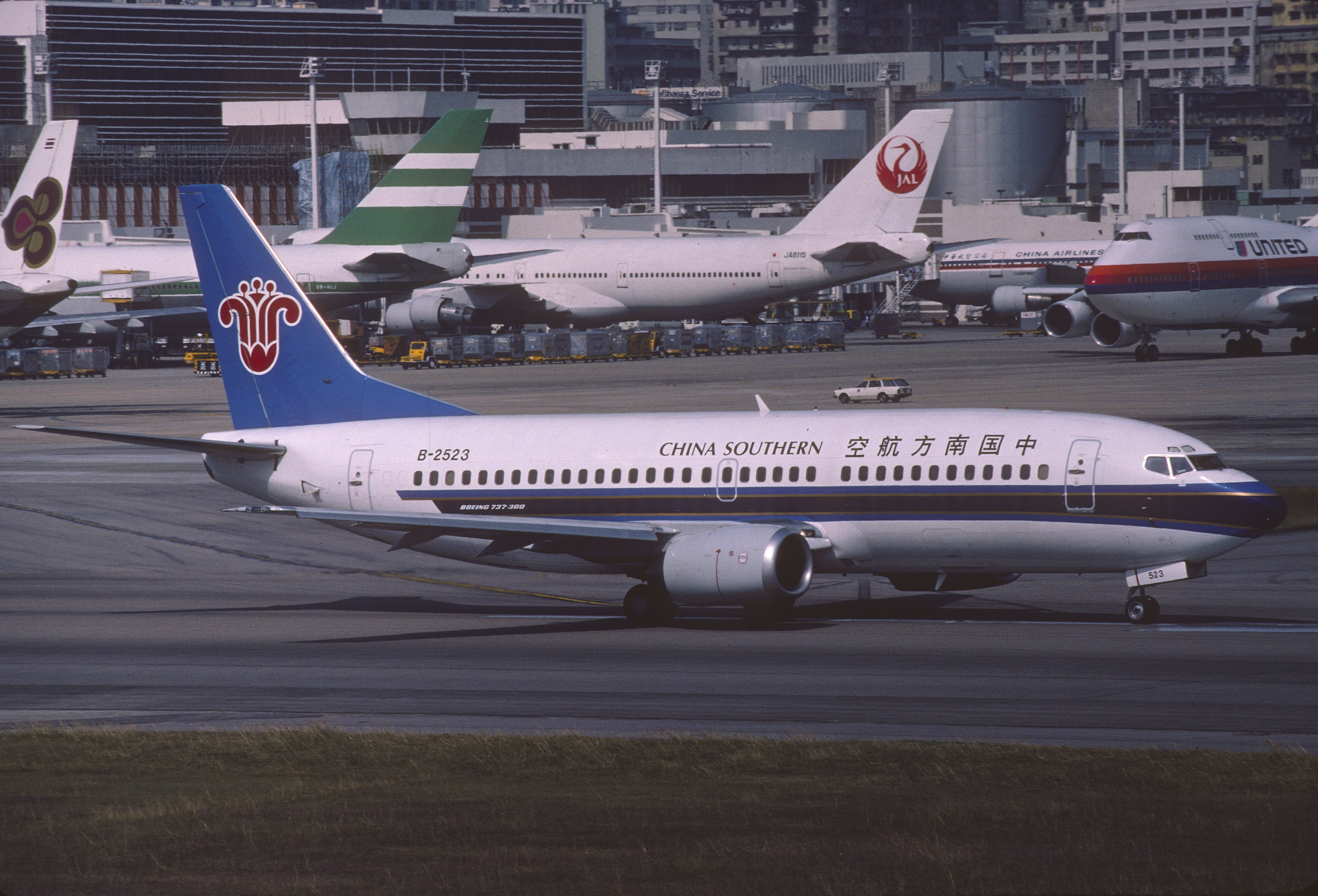
- B-2523, the aircraft involved photographed in 1991

Accident
- Date: 24 November 1992
- Summary: Pilot error; loss of control
- Site: Mount Tianma, Tuling Village, Yangdi Township, Yangshuo County, Guilin, Guangxi Province, China; 25.0593°N 110.1559°E

Aircraft
- Aircraft type: Boeing 737-3Y0
- Operator: China Southern Airlines
- IATA flight No.: CZ3943
- ICAO flight No.: CSN3943
- Call sign: CHINA SOUTHERN 3943
- Registration: B-2523
- Flight origin: Guangzhou Baiyun International Airport
- Destination: Guilin Qifengling Airport
- Occupants: 141
- Passengers: 133
- Crew: 8
- Fatalities: 141
- Survivors: 0

China Southern Airlines Flight 3943 was a China Southern Airlines flight from the former Guangzhou Baiyun International Airport, Guangzhou to Guilin Qifengling Airport, Guilin, China. On 24 November 1992, the Boeing 737-300 crashed on a mountain while descending to Guilin Airport, killing all 141 people aboard.

== Background ==
=== Aircraft ===
The aircraft involved in the accident was a Boeing 737-3Y0, registration B-2523, that was equipped with a twin CFMI CFM56-3B-1 turbofan engine. With serial number 24913, it had its maiden flight on 10 May 1991 and was delivered new to China Southern Airlines on 23 May the same year. The airframe was 1 year and 198 days old at the time of the accident, and had logged 4,165 flight hours and 3,153 cycles.

=== Passengers and crew ===
There were 141 people on board, of whom 133 were passengers. Occupants of the aircraft were from the following nationalities:

Nationality	Passengers	Crew	Total
Canada	1	—	1
Macau	1	—	1
Spain	2	—	2
China	120	8	128
Taiwan	9	—	9
Total	133	8	141

== Accident ==
Flight 3943 departed from the former Guangzhou Baiyun International Airport on 07:17 CST (23:17 UTC) and cruised at an altitude of 7,000 metres (23,000 ft). During the descent towards Guilin, at an altitude of 7,000 feet (2,100 m), the captain attempted to level off the plane by raising the nose. The plane's autothrottle was engaged for descent, but the crew did not notice that the number 2 power lever was at idle. This led to an asymmetrical power condition. The airplane rolled to the right, and the crew was unable to regain control. At 07:52 CST (23:52 UTC), the plane crashed at Mount Tianma, 12.5 mi (20.1 km) south of Guilin Qifengling Airport in Yangdi Township, Yangshuo County. It was the deadliest accident involving a Boeing 737-300 at the time, as well as the deadliest on Chinese soil; as of June 2025, it is still the second-deadliest accident in both of those categories, behind Flash Airlines Flight 604, and China Northwest Airlines Flight 2303, respectively. It is also the accident with the highest number of fatalities involving a China Southern Airlines aircraft.

== Similar accidents ==
- Sriwijaya Air Flight 182
- TAROM Flight 371
- United Airlines Flight 585
- USAir Flight 427
