= Fuzhou Yixu Airport =

Military airport of Fuzhou, Fujian, China

Fuzhou Yixu Airport 福州义序机场
- IATA: FOC; ICAO: ZSFZ

Summary
- Airport type: Military
- Serves: Fuzhou
- Location: Nantai Island, Cangshan, Fuzhou, Fujian, China
- Opened: 1 December 1974 (civil)
- Passenger services ceased: 23 June 1997
- Built: 1944 (military)
- Interactive map of Fuzhou Yixu Airport

Runways
Direction	Length		Surface
Direction	ft	m	Surface
08/26	7,874	2,400	Asphalt

Fuzhou Yixu International Airport was a formerly civil and military dual-use airport located in the south side of Gaogai Mountain, Nantai Island, Cangshan District, near downtown Fuzhou, Fujian Province.

It was the main airport of the city prior to the opening of Fuzhou Changle International Airport, which opened on June 23, 1997.

== Location ==
Yixu Airport was located at the southern foot of Gaogai Mountain, surrounded by mountains, such as Yisu mountain, Wuhu Mountain, Dading Mountain. The air environment/quality is poor and often foggy, hence landing there could sometimes be hard. Due to frequent bad weathers and typhoons, rainfall and thunderstorms are very common. It is located near the city center, resulting in air pollution.

== History ==
As Fuzhou was occupied by the Japanese for the second time in 1944, in order to compete with the Allied forces for air supremacy, the Japanese army accelerated the construction of an airport in the occupied area, and Fuzhou Airport was one of them. At that time, the Japanese forces forced villagers in the Cangshan area of Fuzhou near the airport to build the airport, including even child labors . After the end of the Second world war, it was taken over by the Air Force of the Republic of China . It was converted to civilian use on January 15, 1948 and taken over by the Chinese People's Liberation Army a year later, and it became a military-civilian airport on December 1, 1974. At this time, Yixu Airport was a simple, small airport. There were no blind landing facilities in the field and basic equipment was very poor, and it could only be used by small aircraft such as Viscount and Antonov 24 during the day. The airport built a larger terminal building in 1979, covering 5142 square meters of ground. In March 1980, the Fujian Provincial People's Government decided to expand the airport, and the main project was completed on February 25, 1982. After the expansion, the main runway of the airport has been extended to 2,400 meters, thickened by 30 cm, aprons and parallel slides have been enlarged, and blind landing equipments and radars has been added, making it a medium-sized one that can be used day and night for large aircraft such as Trident and Boeing 737. The airport opened many domestic and foreign air routes and hence, once became a profitable airport in China. In 1996, the passenger throughput was 2.05 million. However, due to the limitation of clearance conditions, the airport could not be expanded and modernized further. Frequent takeoffs and landings caused cracks in the runway and sinking of the foundation. Yixu Airport was turned into a pure military airport after the opening of Fuzhou Changle International Airport in 1997.

== Facilities ==
Before 1982, the runway was only 1,900 meters and 15cm thick, and basic equipment and building quality was very poor. After the reform and opening up, the airport was modernized and most equipment and facilities were modernized, allowing larger aircraft to operate. By 1997, many medium and smaller-body aircraft had served at the airport, such as the Boeing 737, Boeing 757, McDonnell-Douglas MD-82, Hawker-Siddeley Trident, Vickers Viscount, Antonov An-24, Antonov An-2, Xi'an Y-7.

== Accidents and incidents ==
Landings and takeoffs at Yixu Airport are highly challenging and dangerous, increasing risks of fatal accidents. Any fatal accidents are highlighted in bold.

- On 16 June 1987, A Boeing 737 Advanced (B-2514) collided with a Shenyang J-6 whilst arriving from Kai Tak Airport, causing the J-6 to crash, killing the pilot while the 737 landed safely.
- China Eastern Airlines Flight 5398: On 26 October 1993, a McDonnell Douglas MD-82 arriving from Shenzhen, overran the runway at the airport and struck a ground and pond, killing 2 of 80 occupants.
- On 12 November 1993, a China Northern Airlines McDonnell Douglas MD-82 (B-2138) en route from Changchun Dafangshen Airport to Fuzhou, with 82 occupants, was hijacked by two men mid flight. Both men were armed with scalpels and blood pressure gauge, which they claimed it was a bomb. The plane diverted to Taipei and the hijackers surrendered and requested political asylum. This plane would later crash as China Northern Airlines flight 6136, killing all 112 on board.

== Airlines and destinations ==
In the 1970s through its dissolution in 1988, the airport was mostly served by CAAC. The amount of passengers increased dramatically during the reform and opening up era. In addition, the airport was too close to the city center and the surrounding mountains and was constrained to expand and modernize. By the 1990s, it was primarily served by Xiamen Air.

Airlines	Destinations
Air China	Beijing/Capital, Chengdu, Chongqing, Guangzhou, Guilin/Qifengling, Haikou/Dayingshan, Hangzhou, Nanchang/Xiangtang, Nanjing, Qingdao, Sanya/Old, Sanya/Phoenix, Shanghai/Hongqiao, Shenzhen, Tianjin, Wenzhou, Wuhan, Xi'an/Xianyang, Xi'an Xiguan, Zhengzhou/Dongjiao
Air Great Wall	Beijing/Capital, Guangzhou
C.A.A.C Airlines	Beijing/Capital, Chengdu, Guangzhou, Guilin/Qifengling, Hangzhou, Hong Kong/Kai Tak, Qingdao, Nanjing/Dajiaochang, Shanghai/Hongqiao, Tianjin, Zhengzhou/Dongjiao
China Eastern Airlines	Beijing/Capital, Chengdu, Chongqing, Guangzhou, Guilin/Qifengling, Haikou/Dayingshan, Hangzhou, Hong Kong/Kai Tak, Macau, Nanchang/Xiangtang, Nanjing, Qingdao, Sanya/Phoenix, Shanghai/Hongqiao, Shenzhen, Taiyuan, Tianjin, Wenzhou, Wuhan, Xi'an/Xianyang, Xi'an Xiguan, Zhengzhou/Dongjiao
China Northern Airlines	Beijing/Capital, Changchun/Dafangshen, Dalian, Shenyang/Dongta, Shenyang/Taoxian
China Northwest Airlines	Shanghai/Hongqiao, Xi'an/Xiguan, Xi'an/Xianyang
China Southern Airlines	Beijing/Capital, Chengdu, Chongqing, Guangzhou, Guilin/Qifengling, Haikou/Dayingshan, Hangzhou, Hong Kong/Kai Tak, Nanchang/Xiangtang, Nanjing, Sanya/Phoenix, Shanghai/Hongqiao, Shantou/Waisha, Shenzhen, Tianjin, Wenzhou, Wuhan, Xi'an/Xianyang, Xi'an Xiguan, Zhengzhou/Dongjiao
China Southwest Airlines	Chengdu, Chongqing/Baishiyi, Chongqing/Jiangbei, Guangzhou/Baiyun
China Xinjiang Airlines	Beijing/Capital, Changzhou, Ürümqi
China Yunnan Airlines	Guangzhou, Kunming/Wujiaba
Dragonair	Hong Kong/Kai Tak
Hainan Airlines	Haikou/Dayingshan, Sanya
Shandong Airlines	Beijing/Capital, Guilin/Qifengling, Jinan, Qingdao, Ürümqi
Shanghai Airlines	Guangzhou/Baiyun, Shanghai/Hongqiao
Wuhan Airlines	Wuhan-Nanhu, Wuhan-Tianhe, Wuhan-Wangjiadun
Xiamen Air	Bangkok/Don Muang, Beijing/Capital, Changchun/Dafangshen, Changsha/Datuopu, Changsha/Huanghua, Chengdu, Chongqing, Dalian, Guangzhou, Guilin/Qifengling, Haikou/Dayingshan, Hangzhou, Hong Kong/Kai Tak, Jinan, Kuala Lumpur/Subang, Kunming/Wujiaba, Lanzhou, Luzhou, Macau, Nanchang/Xiangtang, Nanjing/Dajiaochang, Qingdao, Phuket, Saigon, Sanya/Phoenix, Singapore, Shanghai/Hongqiao, Shantou/Waisha, Shenzhen, Taiyuan, Tianjin, Tokyo-Narita, Wenzhou, Wuhan-Nanhu, Wuhan-Tianhe, Xi'an/Xianyang, Zhengzhou/Dongjiao, Zhuhai
