= China Northern Airlines =

Chinese airline (1990–2004)

China Northern Airlines 中国北方航空

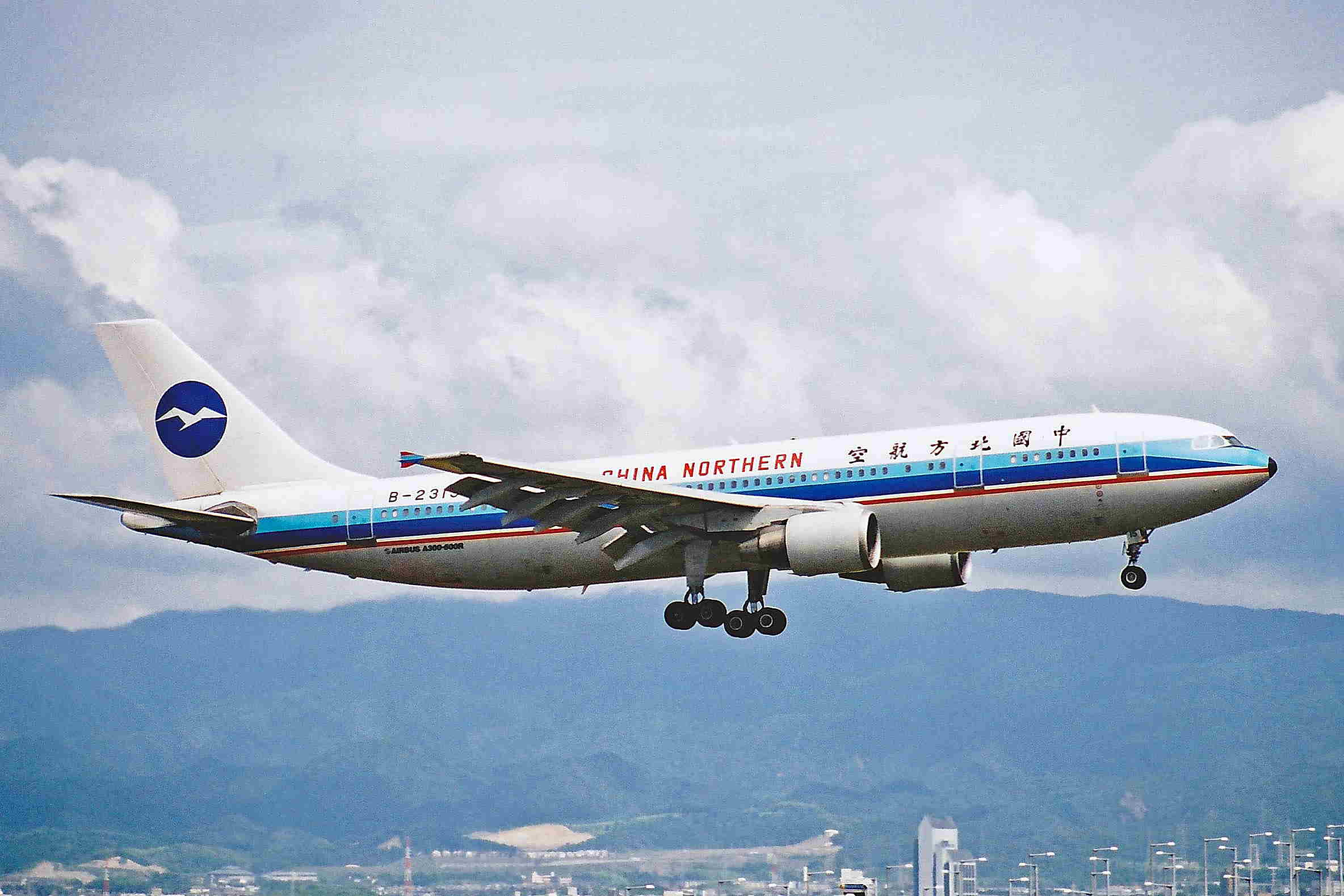
- China Northern Airlines Airbus A300-600R
IATA	ICAO	Call sign
CJ	CBF	CHINA NORTHERN
- Founded: 16 June 1990
- Ceased operations: 12 November 2004 (merged into China Southern Airlines)
- Hubs: Shenyang
- Secondary hubs: Changchun–Dafangshen; Dalian; Harbin; Sanya
- Subsidiaries: Beihai Airlines; China Northern Swan Airlines
- Fleet size: 111 (2004)
- Destinations: 152
- Headquarters: Shenyang, Liaoning, China
- Key people: Zhou Yong Qian (President)
- Employees: 8,000 (2000)

China Northern Airlines
- Simplified Chinese: 中国北方航空公司
- Traditional Chinese: 中國北方航空公司
Transcriptions
Standard Mandarin
- Hanyu Pinyin: Zhōngguó Běifāng Hángkōng Gōngsī

Alternative Chinese name
- Chinese: 北方航空
- Literal meaning: Northern Airlines
Transcriptions
Standard Mandarin
- Hanyu Pinyin: Běifāng Hángkōng

Second alternative Chinese name
- Chinese: 北航
Transcriptions
Standard Mandarin
- Hanyu Pinyin: Běiháng

China Northern Airlines (simplified Chinese: 中国北方航空; traditional Chinese: 中國北方航空; pinyin: Zhōngguó Běifāng Hángkōng) was an airline headquartered on the grounds of Shenyang Taoxian International Airport, Shenyang, Liaoning, People's Republic of China. Established on June 16, 1990, it was one of the six backbone airlines directly under the Civil Aviation Administration of China.

Besides Shenyang, it also had four other hubs at Changchun Dafangshen Airport, Dalian Zhoushuizi International Airport, Harbin Taiping International Airport and Sanya Phoenix International Airport.

It was one of six major airline corporations that were formed as a result of the breakup of CAAC. It initially operated a fleet of Airbus A300-600R, MD-80, MD-90-30 and, later, Airbus A321-200 aircraft. It operated predominantly domestic destinations and also to North Korea, South Korea and Japan.

== History ==
China Northern Airlines was established on 16 June 1990. In 1994, China Northern Airlines decided to purchase 11 McDonnell Douglas MD-90 aircraft, whilst passing down some of their older McDonnell Douglas MD-82 to smaller airlines like its subsidiary, Beihai Airlines. By 1997, China Northern had increased the number ordered to 13. In 1997, the airline relocated its training center from the United States to the new Kunming Training Centre. In 1998, China Northern was China's 5th largest airline in terms of passenger traffic, and had a load factor of 55.1%. In 1999, it was announced that Britten-Norman would resurrect the Britten-Norman Trislander after China Northern placed an order for 3 aircraft, scheduled to be delivered between September 2000 and January 2001. This was done to replace the airline's aging Harbin Y-5 biplanes for regional services. By the end of 1999, the airline had reached a total cargo rotation volume of 4882 million ton/km. Around this time, it was said that China Eastern Airlines was considering acquiring China Northern Airlines, along with China Northwest Airlines.

In 2000, it was announced that China Northern signed a deal with Airbus for ten Airbus A321 aircraft. In November 2000, China Northern and Angel Air formed a partnership which involved wet leasing 3 Airbus A300-600R from China Northern to Angel Air, and a possible joint marketing agreement. The wet lease was scheduled to last for 3–5 years. By the end of 2000, reports by China's official press outlined a draft plan for a wave of airline consolidations in China, which included the acquisition of China Northern Airlines by China Southern Airlines. This came after years of pressure by the CAAC to consolidate many of China's airlines into China's 3 largest airlines (Air China, China Eastern Airlines and China Southern Airlines) to eradicate unnecessary competition. On 3 January 2002, Angel Air announced it would halt all services on 5 January, and that the partnership with China Northern would end.

In October 2002, China's state council approved the takeover of China Northern Airlines and China Xinjiang Airlines by China Southern Airlines. By January 2003, both airlines began operating China Southern's IATA code "CZ" for all domestic flights, with international flights to follow by 30 March 2003. At that time, both airlines had their frequent flyer programs merge into Sky Pearl Club. Whilst operating under the China Southern Airlines brand, it was reported that China Northern was to order 23 Airbus A320 family aircraft to replace its aging MD-80 and MD-90 aircraft. By the September 2004, the airline had already taken delivery of 4 Airbus A319 aircraft. China Northern later fully merged into China Southern Airlines by the end of 2004.

== Destinations ==
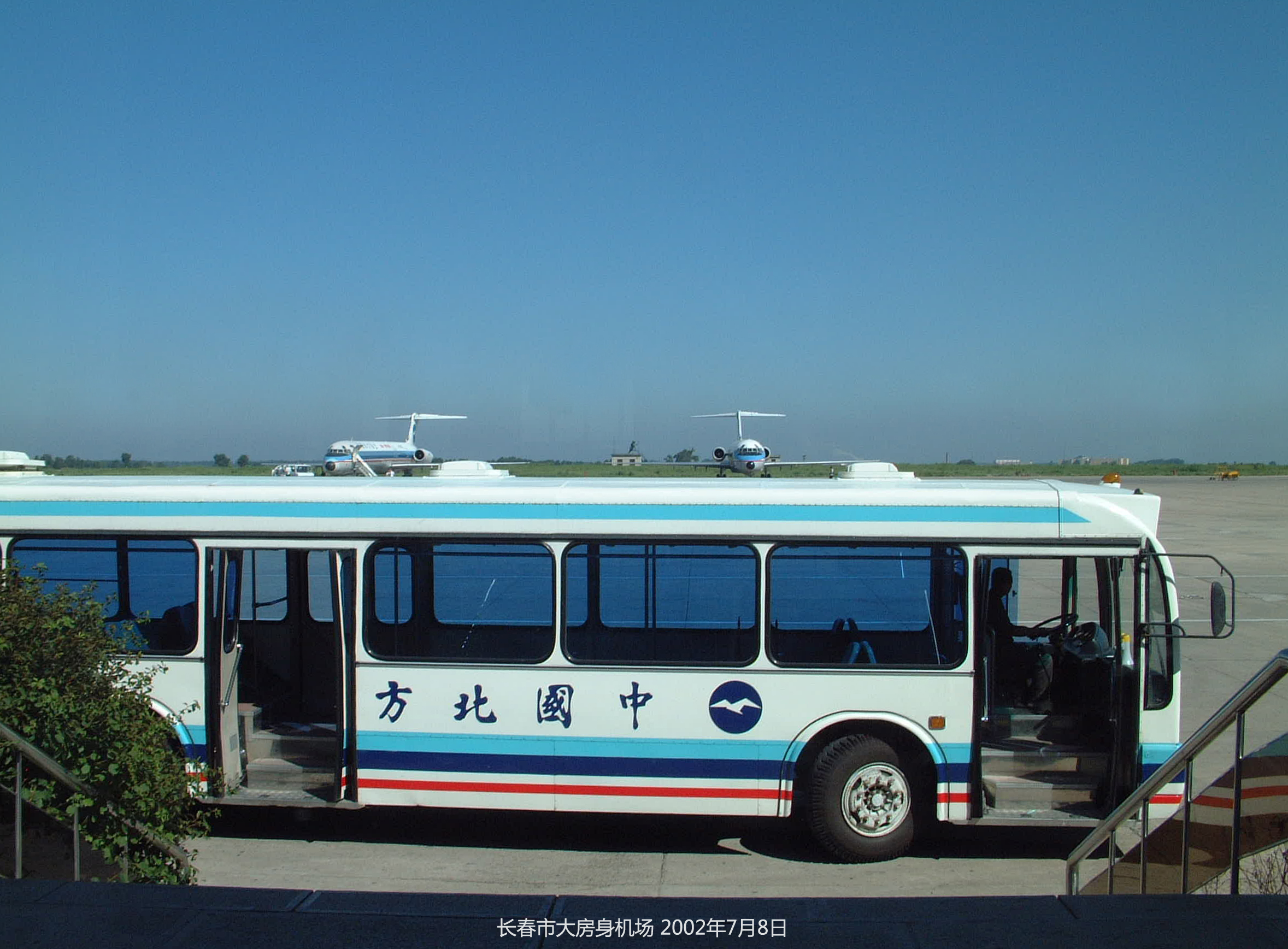
Tarmac view of Changchun Dafangshen Airport, one of China Northern's hubs

The following is an incomplete list of destinations served by China Northern Airlines:

Country	City	Airport	Notes
China	Beijing	Beijing Capital International Airport	
China	Changchun	Changchun Dafangshen Airport	Hub
China	Changsha	Changsha Huanghua International Airport	
China	Changzhou	Changzhou Benniu International Airport	
China	Chaoyang	Chaoyang Airport	
China	Chengdu	Chengdu Shuangliu International Airport	
China	Chifeng	Chifeng Yulong Airport	
China	Chongqing	Chongqing Jiangbei International Airport	
China	Dalian	Dalian Zhoushuizi International Airport	Hub
China	Fuzhou	Fuzhou Changle International Airport	
China	Fuzhou	Fuzhou Yixu Airport	Airport closed
China	Guangzhou	Guangzhou Baiyun International Airport	
China	Guilin	Guilin Liangjiang International Airport	
China	Guilin	Guilin Qifengling Airport	Airport closed
China	Guiyang	Guiyang Longdongbao International Airport	
China	Haikou	Haikou Dayingshan Airport	Airport closed
China	Haikou	Haikou Meilan International Airport	
China	Hangzhou	Hangzhou Jianqiao Airport	
China	Hangzhou	Hangzhou Xiaoshan International Airport	
China	Harbin	Harbin Taiping International Airport	Hub
China	Hefei	Hefei Luogang Airport	
China	Hong Kong	Hong Kong International Airport	
China	Hong Kong	Kai Tak Airport	Airport closed
China	Jinan	Jinan Yaoqiang International Airport	
China	Jinan	Jinan Zhangzhuang Airport	Airport closed
China	Kunming	Kunming Wujiaba International Airport	
China	Lianyungang	Lianyungang Baitabu Airport	
China	Macau	Macau International Airport	
China	Nanjing	Nanjing Dajiaochang Airport	
China	Nanjing	Nanjing Lukou International Airport	
China	Ningbo	Ningbo Lishe International Airport	
China	Qingdao	Qingdao Liuting International Airport	
China	Qinhuangdao	Qinhuangdao Shanhaiguan Airport	
China	Sanya	Sanya Phoenix International Airport	Hub
China	Shanghai	Shanghai Hongqiao International Airport	
China	Shanghai	Shanghai Pudong International Airport	
China	Shantou	Shantou Waisha Airport	
China	Shenyang	Shenyang Taoxian International Airport	Hub
China	Shenzhen	Shenzhen Bao'an International Airport	
China	Shijiazhuang	Shijiazhuang Zhengding International Airport	
China	Weifang	Weifang Airport	
China	Wenzhou	Wenzhou Longwan International Airport	
China	Wuhan	Wuhan Tianhe International Airport	
China	Wuhan	Wuhan Wangjiadun Airport	Airport closed
China	Xi'an	Xi'an Xianyang International Airport	
China	Xiamen	Xiamen Gaoqi International Airport	
China	Yanji	Yanji Chaoyangchuan International Airport	
China	Yantai	Yantai Laishan Airport	
China	Zhengzhou	Zhengzhou Dongjiao Airport	Airport closed
China	Zhengzhou	Zhengzhou Xinzheng International Airport	
China	Zhuhai	Zhuhai Jinwan Airport	
Japan	Osaka	Kansai International Airport	
Japan	Sapporo	New Chitose Airport	
Japan	Toyama	Toyama Airport	
Japan	Niigata	Niigata Airport	
South Korea	Seoul	Gimpo International Airport	
Russia	Irkutsk	International Airport Irkutsk	
Russia	Khabarovsk	Khabarovsk Novy Airport	
Russia	Vladivostok	Vladivostok International Airport	

=== Partner airlines ===
Zhongyuan Airlines had established partnerships with the following airlines:

- Angel Air
- Korean Air

== Fleet ==
=== Final fleet ===
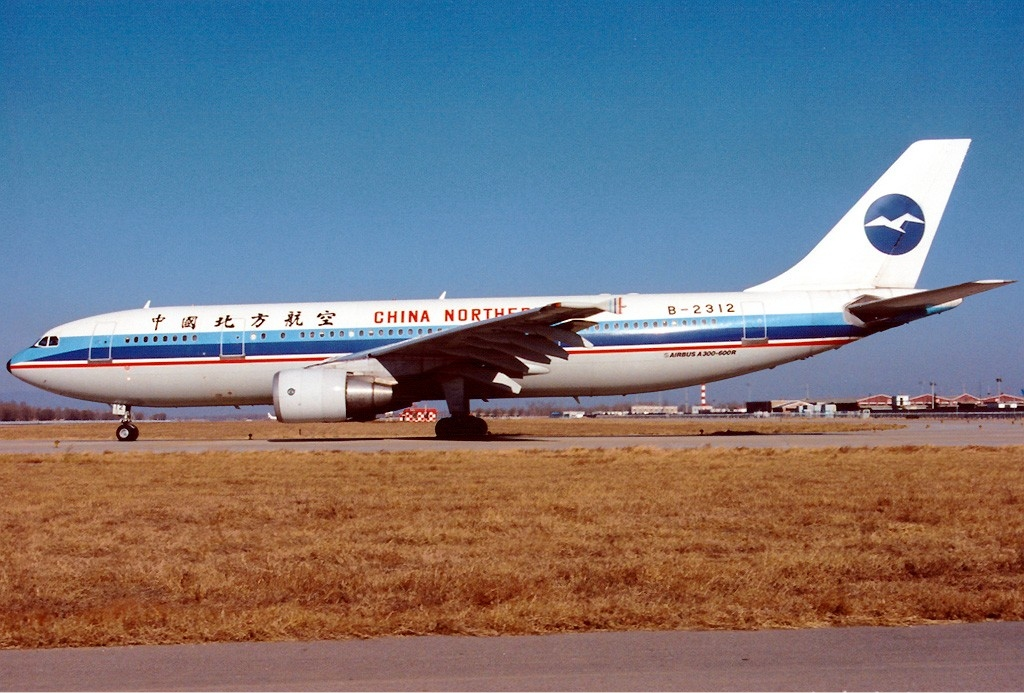
China Northern Airbus A300-600R

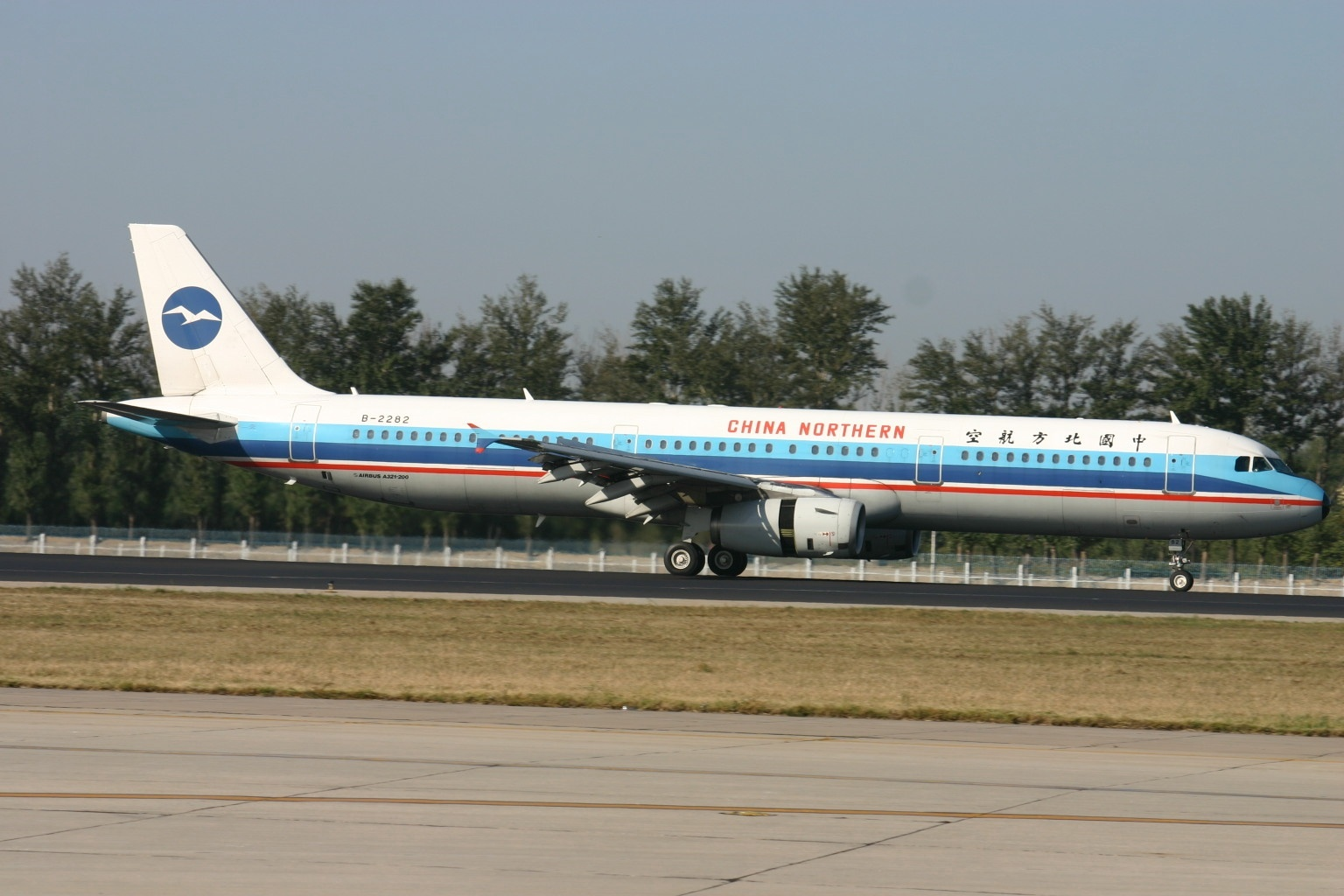
China Northern Airbus A321-200

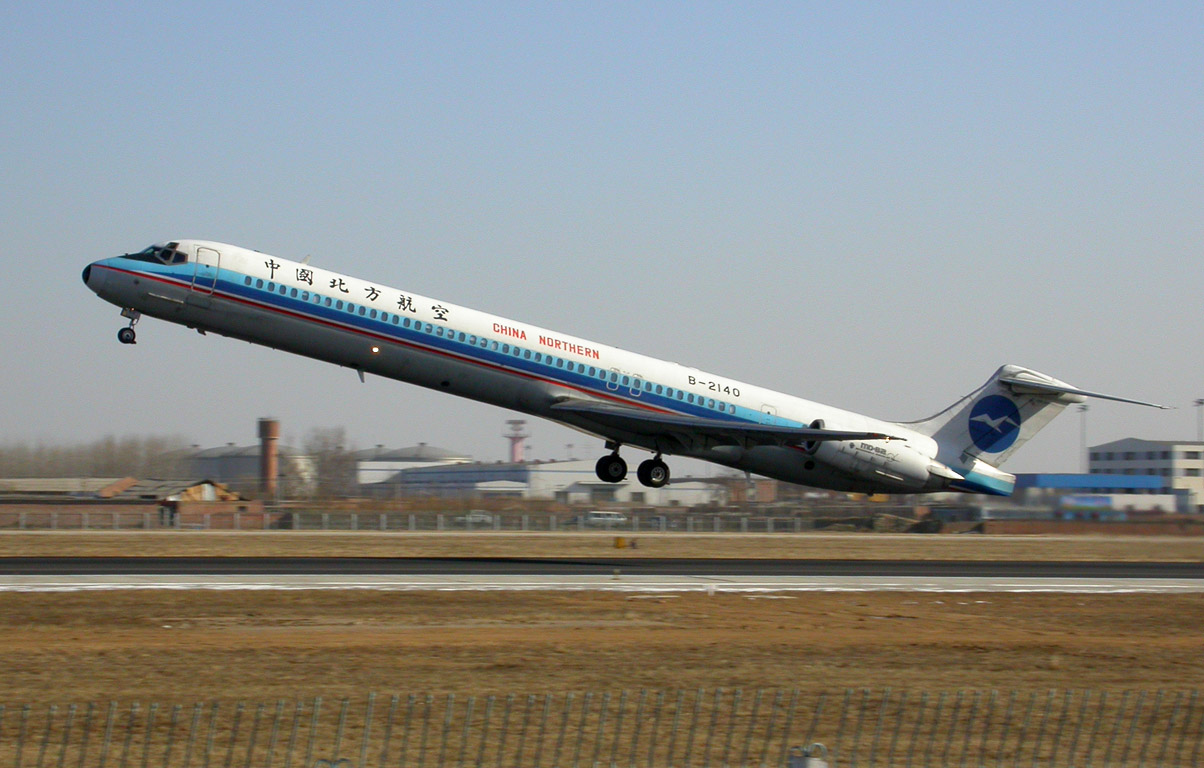
China Northern MD-82

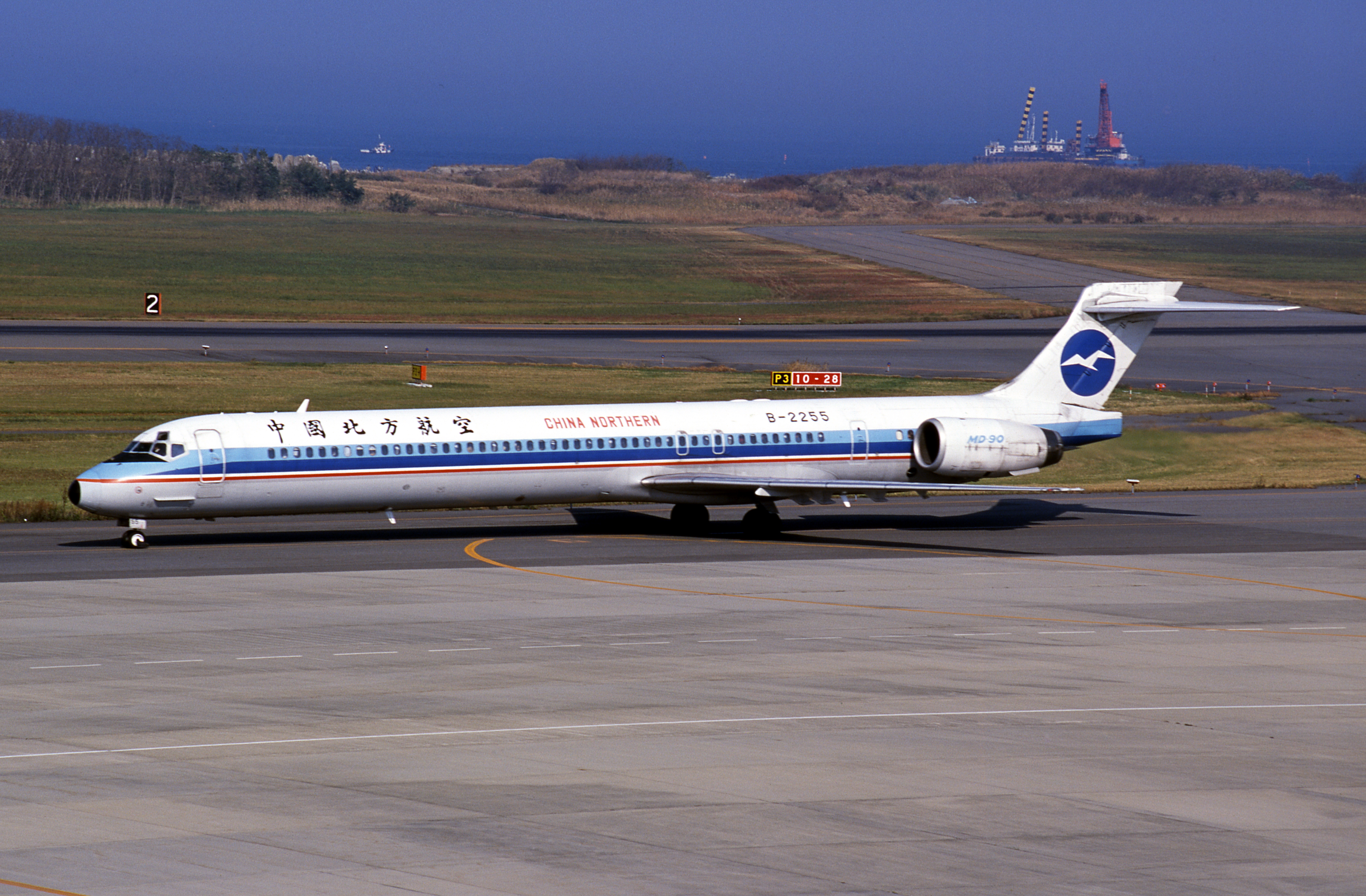
China Northern MD-90-32

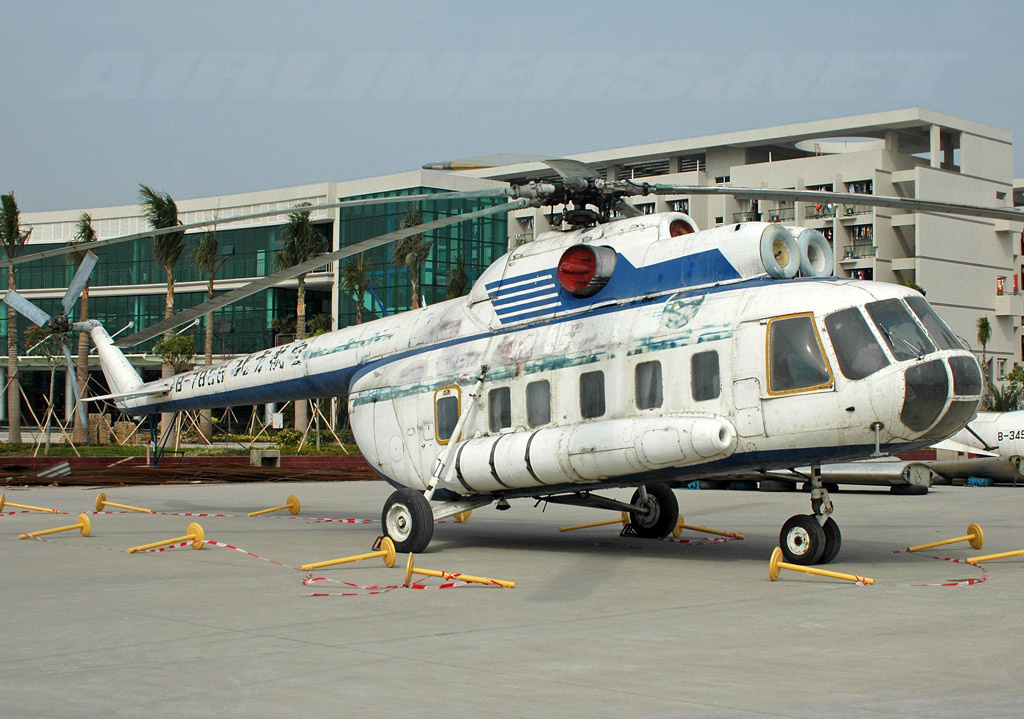
China Northern Mil Mi-8P

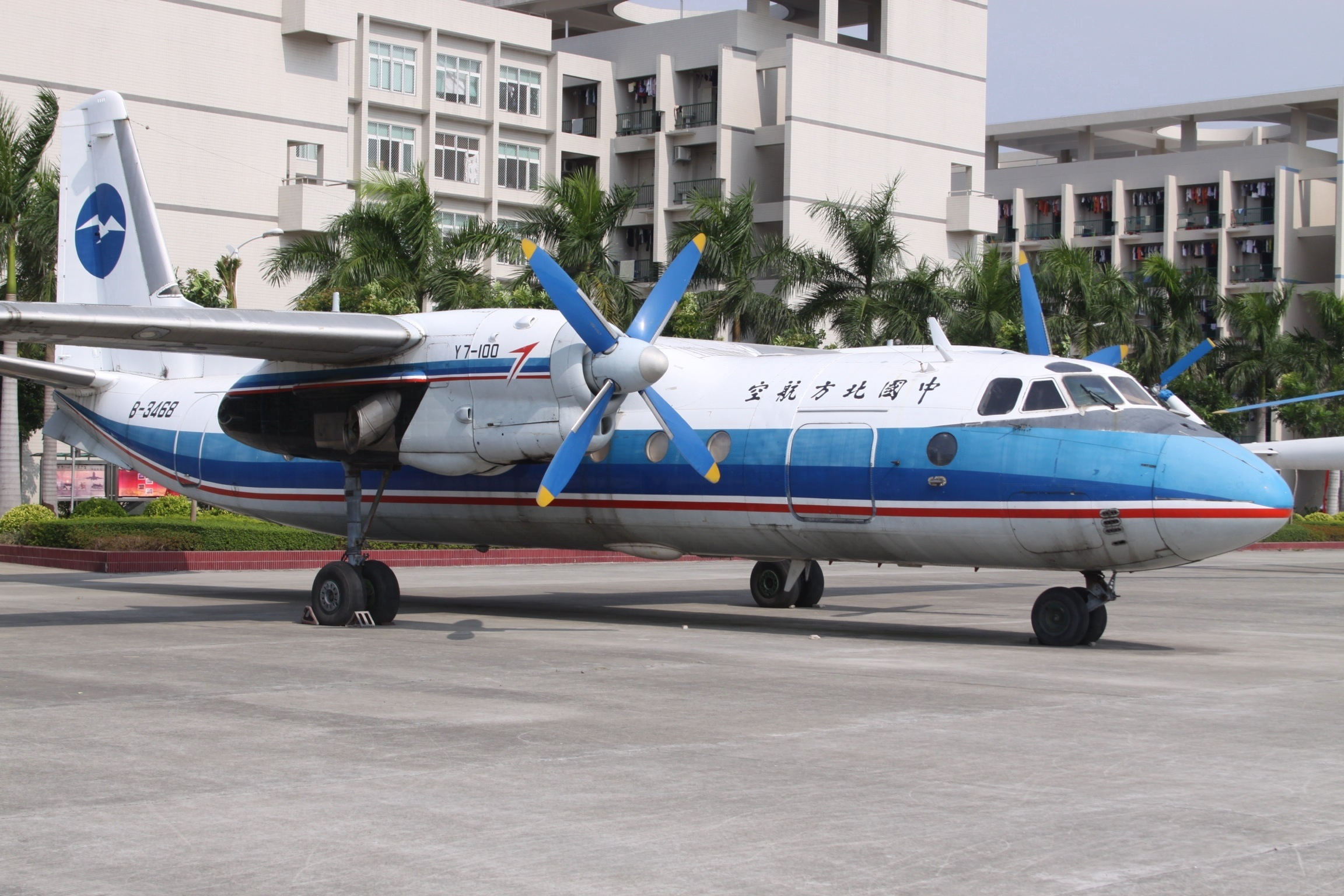
China Northern Xian Y-7-100

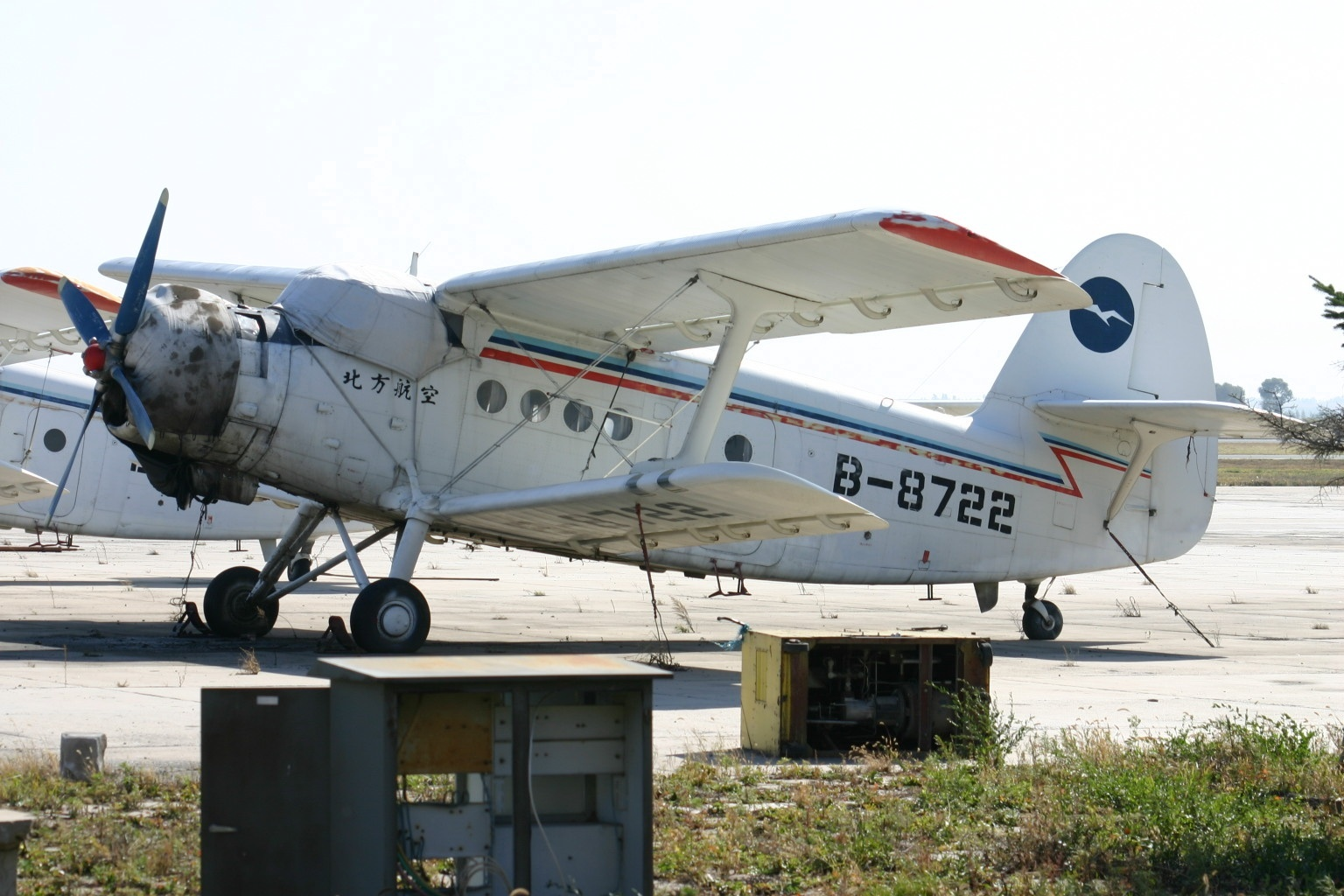
China Northern Yunshuji Y-5

At the time of merger, China Northern Airlines fleet consisted of:

Aircraft	In service	Orders	Notes
Airbus A300-600R	6	—	
Airbus A319-100	4	7	Operated under China Southern Airlines brand
Airbus A321-200	6	4	Orders transferred to China Southern Airlines
Cessna 208 Caravan	5	—	Used for agricultural support and passenger services
McDonnell Douglas MD-82	23	—	
McDonnell Douglas MD-90-30	13	—	
Xi'an MA60	—	5	
Xian Y-7-100	10	—	
Yunshuji Y-5	44	—	
Total	111	16	

=== Fleet history ===
Throughout the airline's history, the airline had operated:

Aircraft	Total	Introduced	Retired	Notes
Airbus A300-600R	8	1993	2004	
Airbus A319-100	4	2004	2004	Operated under China Southern Airlines brand
Airbus A321-200	6	2001	2004	
Cessna 208 Caravan	5	2002	Unknown	
McDonnell Douglas MD-82	27	1990	2004	
McDonnell Douglas MD-90-30	13	1996	2004	
Xian Y-7-100	11	1990	2004	
Yunshuji Y-5	Unknown	Unknown	Unknown	

China Northern Airlines also operated a helicopter fleet.

== Subsidiaries ==
=== China Northern Swan Airlines ===
China Northern Swan Airlines was founded in 1993 as Swan Airlines by the company Sunbase. The airline was based at Harbin Taiping International Airport, Harbin. In 1996, the airline was acquired by China Northern Airlines, and by 2001, flew to 45 medium to large-sized cities both domestically and internationally. It operated McDonnell Douglas MD-80s and McDonnell Douglas MD-90s leased from China Northern Airlines, it was acquired by China Southern Airlines in 2003 followed by Beiha Airlines, China Northern Airlines, and Zhongyuan Airlines.

== Services ==
=== Frequent flyer program ===
Sky Pearl Club was China Northern Airlines' frequent flyer program from 2002 when it was acquired by China Southern Airlines.

== Accidents ==
- On November 13, 1993, China Northern Airlines Flight 6901 from Beijing to Urumqi, a McDonnell-Douglas MD-82 (Reg. B-2141) airliner, crashed on approach to Urumqi airport, killing 12 of 102 on board. Pilot error was blamed for the crash.
- On May 7, 2002, China Northern Airlines Flight 6136 from Beijing to Dalian, a McDonnell-Douglas MD-82 (Reg. B-2138) airliner, crashed into the Yellow Sea about 6 miles (9.7 km) off the Dalian coast, killing all 112 on board. It was later determined that a passenger who wanted to commit suicide started a fire on board the aircraft.
