= Mudanjiang Hailang International Airport =

Airport in Heilongjiang, China

Mudanjiang Hailang International Airport 牡丹江海浪国际机场
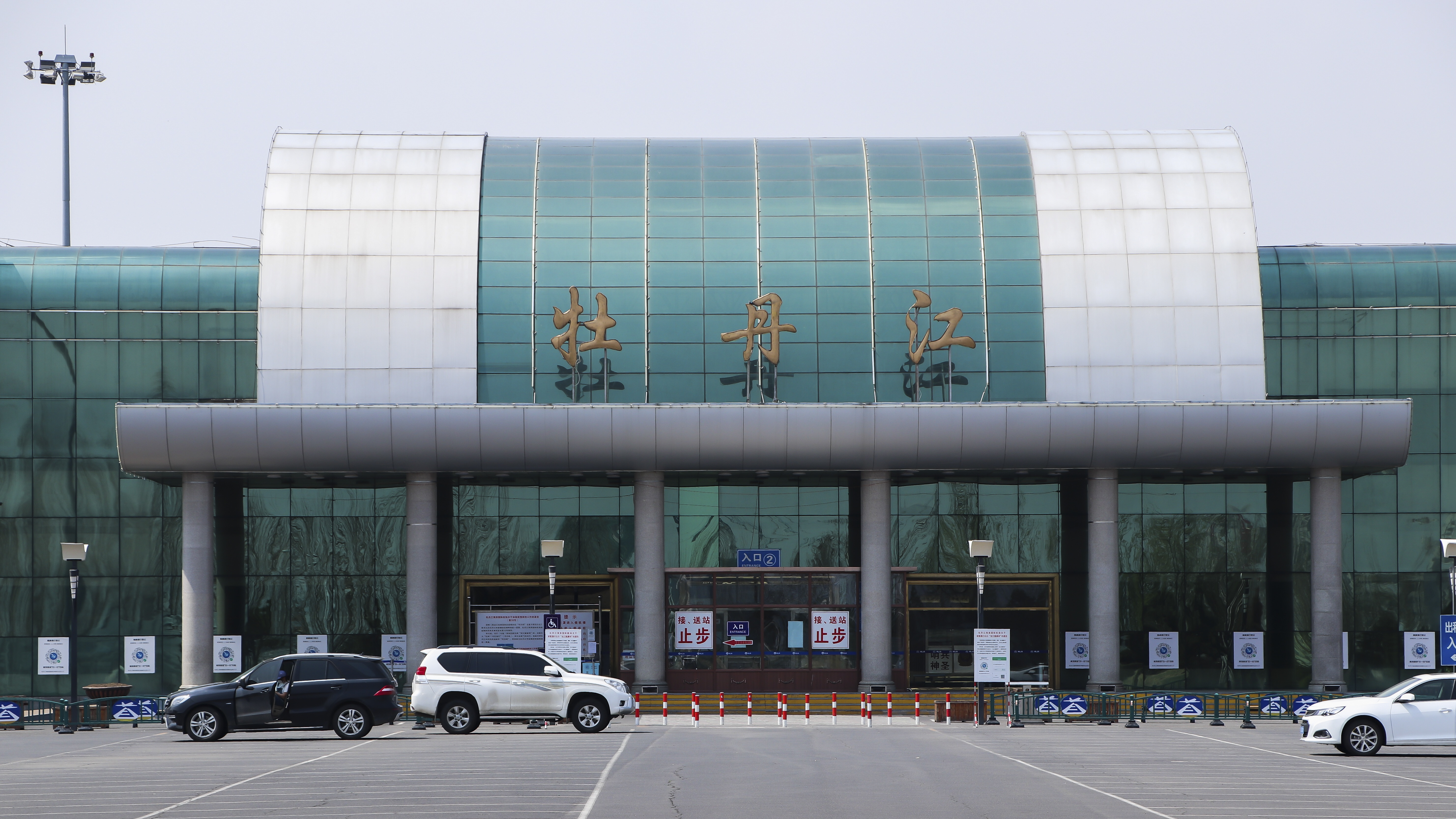
- IATA: MDG; ICAO: ZYMD

Summary
- Airport type: Public
- Serves: Mudanjiang, Heilongjiang
- Opened: 2 September 1985; 40 years ago
- Elevation AMSL: 269 m / 883 ft
- Coordinates: 44°31′27″N 129°34′08″E
- Website: www.mdjjc.cn

Maps
- Airport chart of Mudanjiang Hailang Airport
- Location in Heilongjiang MDG/ZYMD (China)

Runways
Direction	Length		Surface
Direction	m	ft	Surface
04/22	2,600	8,530	Concrete

Statistics (2021)
- Passengers: 757,451
- Aircraft movements: 6,776
- Cargo (metric tons): 1,185.2
- Source: CAAC

Mudanjiang Hailang International Airport
- Simplified Chinese: 牡丹江海浪国际机场
- Traditional Chinese: 牡丹江海浪國際機場
Transcriptions
Standard Mandarin
- Hanyu Pinyin: Mǔdānjiāng Hǎilàng Guójì Jīchǎng

Mudanjiang Hailang International Airport (IATA: MDG, ICAO: ZYMD) is an airport serving the city of Mudanjiang in Heilongjiang Province, China. From 30 March 2025, Mudanjiang Airport has closed for renovation works and all flights have been suspended indefinitely. Suifenhe Dongning Airport opened regular domestic flights on the same day to replace affected passengers from Mudanjiang.

== Airlines and destinations (all suspended) ==
Airlines	Destinations
Air China	Beijing–Capital
China Eastern Airlines	Hangzhou, Qingdao, Shanghai–Hongqiao
China Southern Airlines	Chengdu–Tianfu, Dalian, Guangzhou, Seoul–Incheon, Shenzhen
Korean Air	Seoul–Incheon
Shandong Airlines	Chongqing, Dalian, Qingdao
Shanghai Airlines	Dalian, Shanghai–Pudong
XiamenAir	Hangzhou, Qingdao

Destinations map
Destinations from Mudanjiang Hailang Airport

== See also ==
- List of airports in China
- List of the busiest airports in China
