= Changchun Airport =

Changchun Airport may refer to:

- Changchun Longjia International Airport, civilian passenger airport of Changchun since 2005
- Changchun Dafangshen Airport, Changchun's former civilian/military airport, now solely a military base since 2005
