= Jinzhouwan Airport =

Jinzhouwan Airport may refer to:

- Jinzhou Bay Airport, serving Jinzhou, Liaoning, China
- Dalian Jinzhouwan International Airport, serving Dalian, Liaoning, China
