= China Eastern Airlines Flight 5398 =

1993 aviation accident

Coordinates: 26°00′16″N 119°18′45″E

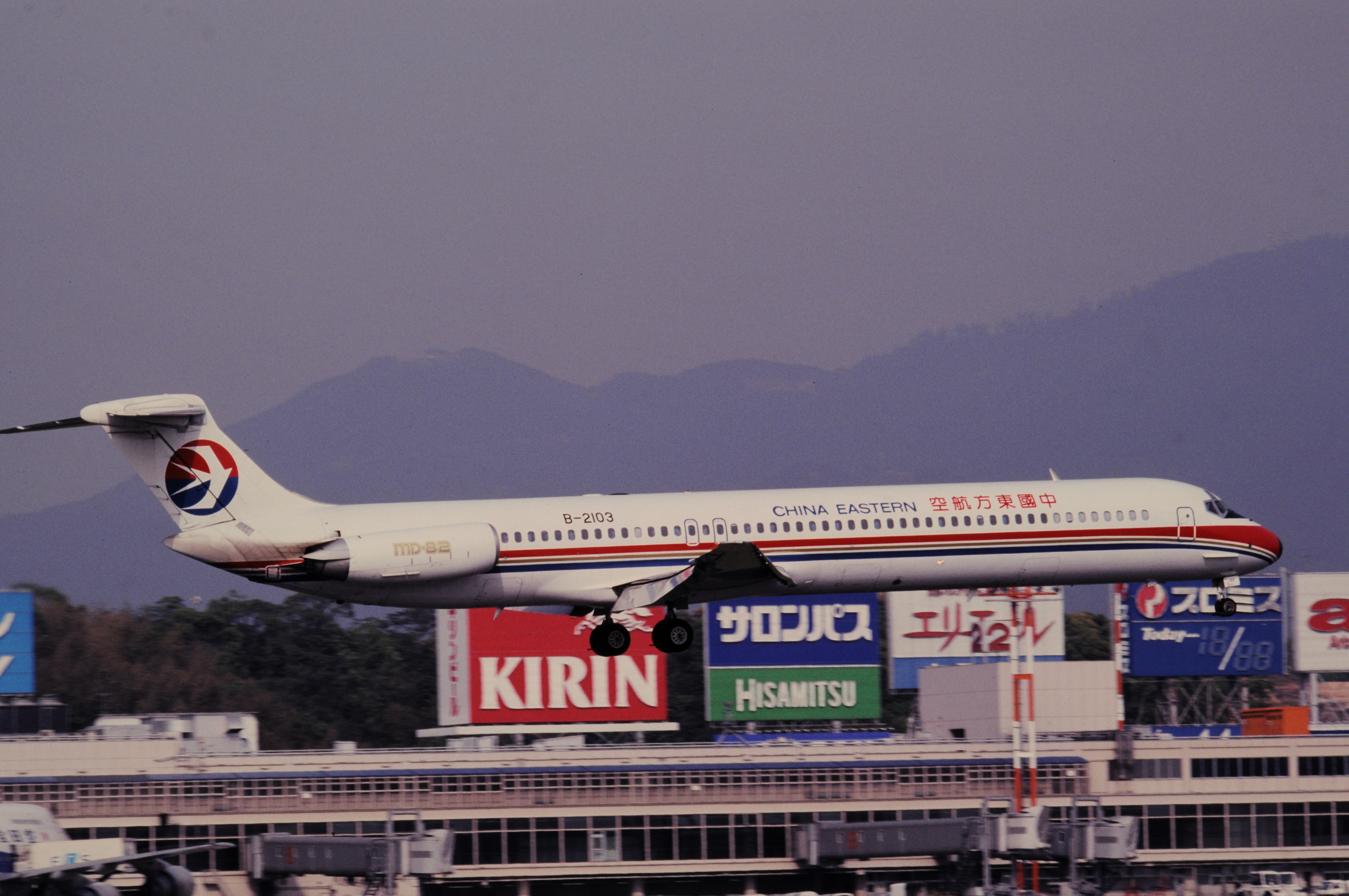
- B-2103, the aircraft involved in the accident, photographed in 1992

Accident
- Date: 26 October 1993
- Summary: Crashed during approach due to bad weather conditions and pilot error
- Site: Fuzhou Yixu Airport, Fuzhou, Fujian, China

Aircraft
- Aircraft type: McDonnell Douglas MD-82
- Operator: China Eastern Airlines
- IATA flight No.: MU5398
- ICAO flight No.: CES5398
- Call sign: CHINA EASTERN 5398
- Registration: B-2103
- Flight origin: Shenzhen Huangtian International Airport
- Destination: Fuzhou Yixu Airport
- Occupants: 80
- Passengers: 71
- Crew: 9
- Fatalities: 2
- Injuries: 10
- Survivors: 78

China Eastern Airlines Flight 5398 was a flight route from Huangtian International Airport (now Bao'an International Airport) in Shenzhen to Fuzhou Yixu Airport in Fujian. On 26 October 1993, the McDonnell Douglas MD-82 flying this route crashed on approach to Fuzhou Yixu Airport. The aircraft overran the runway while landing in heavy rain and high winds. Two of the 80 passengers and crew on board were killed.

== Event summary ==
On October 26, 1993, 11:50am, Flight MU5398 took off from Shenzhen airport and scheduled to land 12:50pm at Fuzhou airport. At 12:32pm, the crew contacted tower in Fuzhou airport preparing for landing. It was raining at the time, and the visibility was 4 km. The crew began the approach despite the poor visibility, resulting in a severe deviation to the right of the runway. The crew did not abort the landing and initiate a go-around, but tried to correct the course while continuing to descend. 1 kilometre (0.62 mi) from the runway, and only 20 metres (66 ft) above the ground, the crew decided to go around. The aircraft kept losing altitude, and its tail struck the runway before the aircraft overran and stopped at a pond. The fuselage broke into 3 pieces. Two people were killed and ten more injured.

Later investigation revealed that the crew of Flight MU5398 violated the approaching protocol at Fuzhou airport, and did not cooperate well with the air traffic controller. The cause of the accident was ruled to be pilot error.

== Aftermath ==
China Eastern Airlines continues to use Flight number MU5398, but it has changed to the route from Chongqing Jiangbei International Airport to Shanghai Pudong International Airport via Wenzhou Longwan International Airport, served by the Boeing 737, but this flight has been suspended by the end of February 2024.

Fuzhou Yixu Airport was built in 1944 as a military airport. From 1974 it served for both civilian and military use, and was served by many domestic and international airlines. Due to the runway length and the increasing air traffic, a new civilian airport was proposed in 1991. On June 23, 1997, Fuzhou Changle International Airport opened for operation. Fuzhou Yixu Airport returned to military use only.

== See also ==
- List of accidents and incidents involving commercial aircraft
