= China Northern Airlines Flight 6901 =

1993 accident in Ürümqi, Xinjiang, China

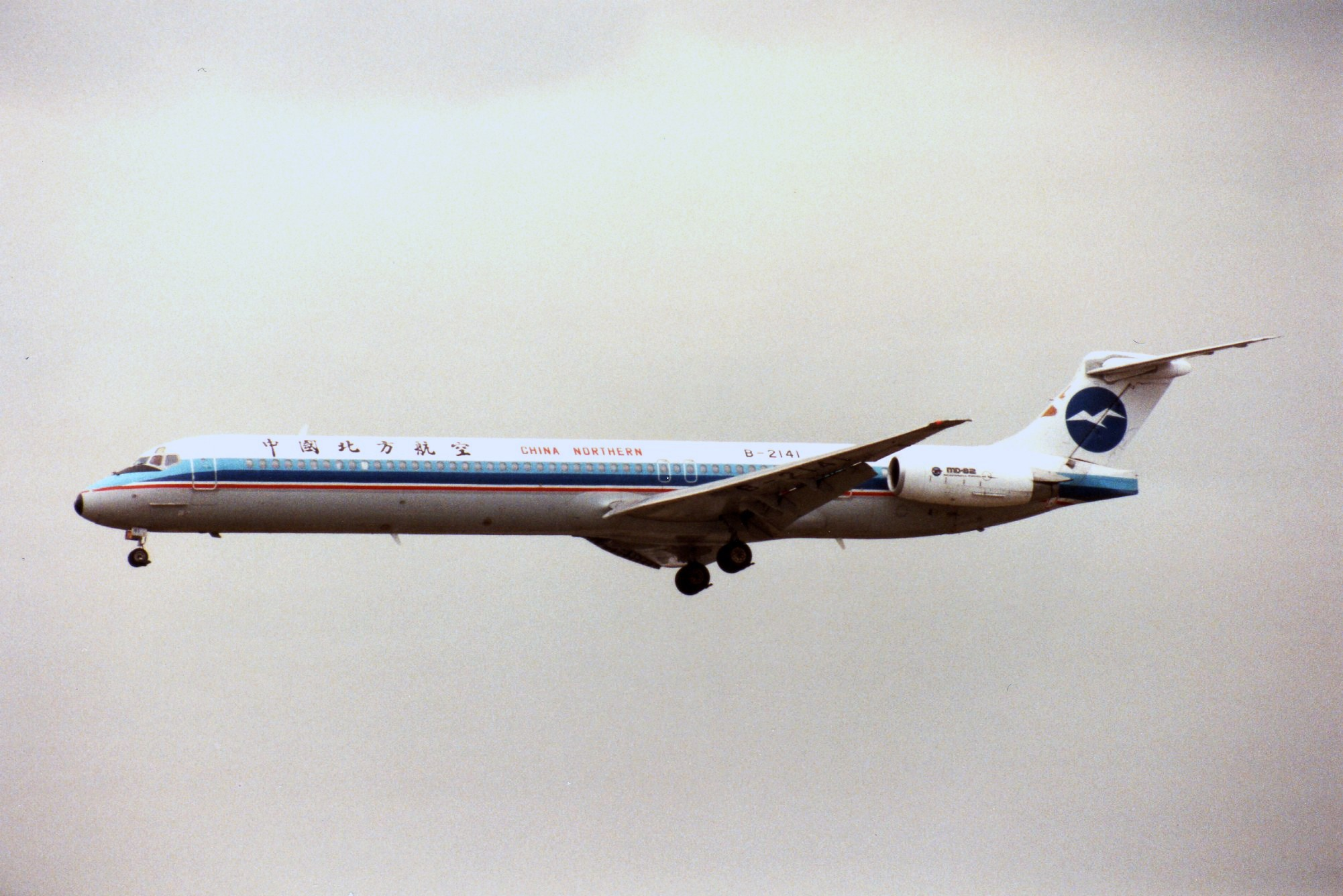
- B-2141, the aircraft involved in the accident, photographed in October 1993

Accident
- Date: November 13, 1993
- Summary: Pilot error (Controlled flight into terrain)
- Site: Near Ürümqi Diwopu International Airport, Ürümqi, Xinjiang, China; 43°55′12″N 87°31′21″E

Aircraft
- Aircraft type: McDonnell Douglas MD-82
- Operator: China Northern Airlines
- IATA flight No.: CJ6901
- ICAO flight No.: CBF6901
- Call sign: CHINA NORTHERN 6901
- Registration: B-2141
- Flight origin: Beijing Capital International Airport Beijing, China
- Destination: Ürümqi Diwopu International Airport, Ürümqi, Xinjiang, China
- Occupants: 102
- Passengers: 92
- Crew: 10
- Fatalities: 12
- Injuries: 60
- Survivors: 90

China Northern Airlines Flight 6901 (CJ6901) was a McDonnell Douglas MD-82 airliner from Beijing's Capital International Airport to Ürümqi Diwopu International Airport in Xinjiang, China. On November 13, 1993, it crashed on approach to Ürümqi Airport. Twelve of the 102 passengers and crew on board were killed. The accident has been attributed to pilot error.

== Accident ==
While on final approach, the autopilot automatically disconnected. The Captain proceeded to reengage it, believing that it would still be in approach mode. When activated, however, the autopilot went into vertical speed mode with a setting of -800 feet per minute. The crew's failure to disconnect the autopilot and manually land the airplane contributed to the accident. Another factor was the crew's lack of proficiency in English. When the Ground Proximity Warning System (GPWS) issued an aural alarm, the captain asked his first officer what the words "Pull up" meant. The first officer replied that he did not know. Consequently, the pilots ignored the warnings and failed to correct their excessive rate of descent, causing the plane to strike power lines and a wall before coming down in a field.

== Aircraft ==
The aircraft involved was a McDonnell Douglas MD-82 with the registration B-2141 and manufacturer's serial number 49849. It was delivered to China Northern Airlines in December 1991.

== See also ==
- List of accidents and incidents involving commercial aircraft
