= Changchun Dafangshen Airport =

Military airport in Changchun, Jilin, China

Changchun Dafangshen Airport 长春大房身机场
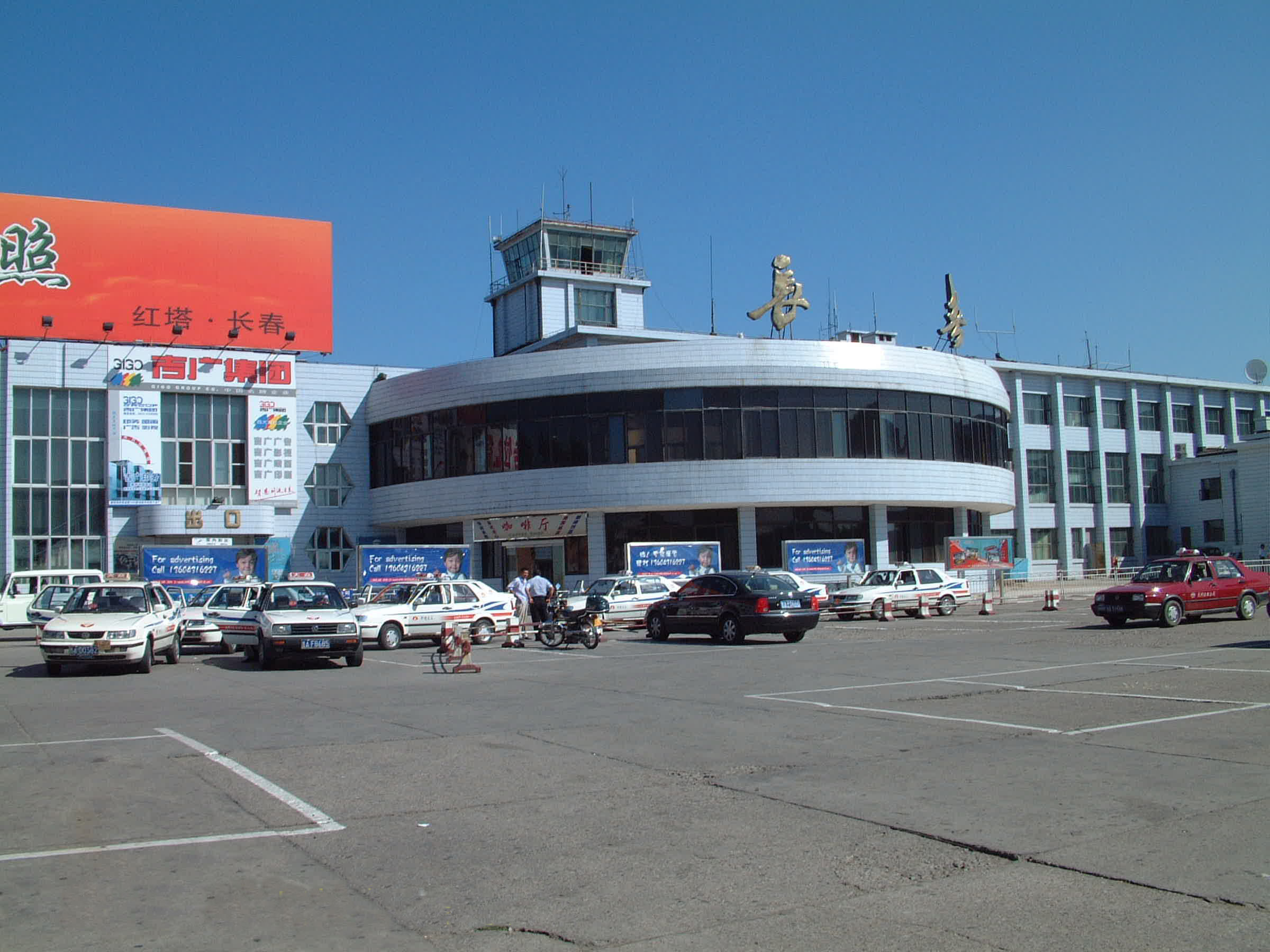
- IATA: none; ICAO: none

Summary
- Airport type: Military
- Owner: People's Liberation Army
- Operator: People's Liberation Army Air Force
- Serves: Changchun
- Location: Xixin Township, Luyuan, Changchun, Jilin, China
- Opened: October 1960 (commercial)
- Passenger services ceased: 27 August 2005
- Hub for: China Northern Airlines (1990–2004)
- Built: 1941
- Elevation AMSL: 228 m (748 ft)
- Coordinates: 43°54′24″N 125°11′51″E

Map
- Location of airport in China Dafangshen (China)

Changchun Dafangshen Airport
- Traditional Chinese: 長春大房身機場
- Simplified Chinese: 长春大房身机场
Transcriptions
Standard Mandarin
- Hanyu Pinyin: Chángchūn Dàfángshēn Jīchǎng
- Wade–Giles: Ch'ang-ch'un Ta-fang-shen Chi-ch'ang

Changchun Dafangshen Airport (or Dafangshen Air Base) is a People's Liberation Army Air Force Base in Changchun, the capital of Northeast China's Jilin province. Originally constructed in 1941 by the Empire of Japan for the capital of its puppet state Manchukuo, Dafangshen Airport saw fierce fighting and was severely damaged during the siege of Changchun in the Chinese Civil War. It served as the city's civilian airport from October 1960 until 27 August 2005, when all commercial flights were transferred to the newly built Changchun Longjia International Airport.

== Location and facilities ==
Dafangshen Airport is located 10.5 kilometres (6.5 mi) west of central Changchun. When opened in 1941, it had a runway measuring 1,465 metres (4,806 ft) by 145 metres (476 ft), and a taxiway measuring 800 metres (2,600 ft) by 80 metres (260 ft). After it became Changchun's main public airport in the People's Republic of China era, it was expanded multiple times, with a domestic terminal, an international terminal, and a 1,550 metres (5,090 ft) dedicated railway among the later additions.

== History ==
=== Manchukuo and Republic of China ===
Dafangshen Airport was built by the Empire of Japan in 1941 to serve Xinjing (now Changchun), then capital of the Japanese puppet state Manchukuo. It replaced the older and smaller Kuanchengzi Airport (宽城子机场).

Near the end of World War II, a Soviet airborne force landed at Dafangshen Airport on 20 August 1945 and captured Changchun from the Japanese army. When the Soviet forces left Changchun on 14 April 1946, the communist Northeast People's Liberation Army took over the city and the airport. Soon afterwards Chiang Kai-shek's Kuomintang army drove out the communists on 23 May 1946.

During the Liaoshen Campaign of the Chinese Civil War, the Northeast People's Liberation Army besieged Changchun. Xiao Jinguang captured Dafangshen and damaged its runway in May 1948 to prevent the Kuomintang from using the airport to supply Zheng Dongguo's defensive forces inside the city. On 16 October, the Kuomintang army launched a fierce attack in an attempt to recapture the airport, but were repelled by Xiao's forces. Most buildings and facilities of the airport were destroyed in the fighting.

=== People's Republic of China ===
After the Communists won the civil war and establishment of the People's Republic of China in 1949, Dafangshen Airport was used for pilot training by the Second Aviation Academy of the People's Liberation Army Air Force. It was later expanded for civil aviation and replaced Datun Airport as Changchun's public airport in October 1960. A 5,756-square-metre (61,960 sq ft) domestic terminal and a 4,172-square-metre (44,910 sq ft) international terminal were constructed. It served mainly domestic destinations as well as Hong Kong and Seoul.

As air travel became increasingly common since the reform and opening era, Dafangshen could not longer accommodate the rapid growth of air traffic, and the new Changchun Longjia International Airport was constructed to replace it as Changchun's public airport. Longjia Airport was opened on 27 August 2005, and Dafangshen reverted to sole military use.

== Former airlines and destinations ==
Shortly after the economic reform and opening up, the air traffic rose dramatically, and many airlines (whether domestic or international) had once operated in Changchun in its heyday. The airlines and destinations are:

Airlines	Destinations
Aeroflot	Moscow/Domodedovo, Moscow/Sheremetyevo, Vladivostok
Air China	Beijing/Capital, Hangzhou/Jianqiao, Hangzhou/Xiaoshan, Shanghai/Hongqiao, Tianjin, Wuhan/Tianhe, Wuhan/Nanhu, Yantai, Zhengzhou/Dongjiao, Zhengzhou Xinzheng
Asiana Airlines	Seoul/Kimpo, Seoul/Incheon
CAAC Airlines	Beijing/Capital, Dalian, Harbin/Majiagou, Harbin/Taiping, Hangzhou/Jianqiao, Hohhot, Nanchang/Xiangtang, Shanghai/Hongqiao, Tianjin, Shenyang/Dongta, Wuhan/Nanhu, Wuhan/Wangjiadun, Zhengzhou/Dongjiao
China Eastern Airlines	Beijing/Capital, Chengdu, Jinan, Nanchang/Changbei, Nanchang/Xiangtang, Qingdao/Liuting, Shanghai/Hongqiao, Taiyuan, Tianjin, Xi'an
China Northern Airlines	Dalian, Harbin, Hangzhou, Hohhot, Hong Kong/Kai Tak, Hong Kong/Chek Lap Kok, Shenyang/Taoxian, Tianjin
China Northwest Airlines	Beijing/Capital, Xi'an/Xiguan, Xi'an/Xianyang
China Southwest Airlines	Beijing/Capital, Chengdu, Chongqing/Baishiyi, Chongqing Jiangbei, Shanghai/Hongqiao
China Southern Airlines	Beijing/Capital, Dalian, Shenyang, Tianjin
Imperial Japanese Airways	Seoul/Yeouido, Shanghai/Longhua, Shenyang/Dongta, Tokyo/Haneda
Shandong Airlines	Beijing/Capital, Qingdao, Yantai
Xiamen Air	Beijing/Capital, Changsha/Huanghua, Fuzhou/Yixu, Fuzhou/Changle, Hangzhou/Jianqiao, Hangzhou/Xiaoshan, Ningbo, Quanzhou, Tianjin, Xiamen

== Gallery ==
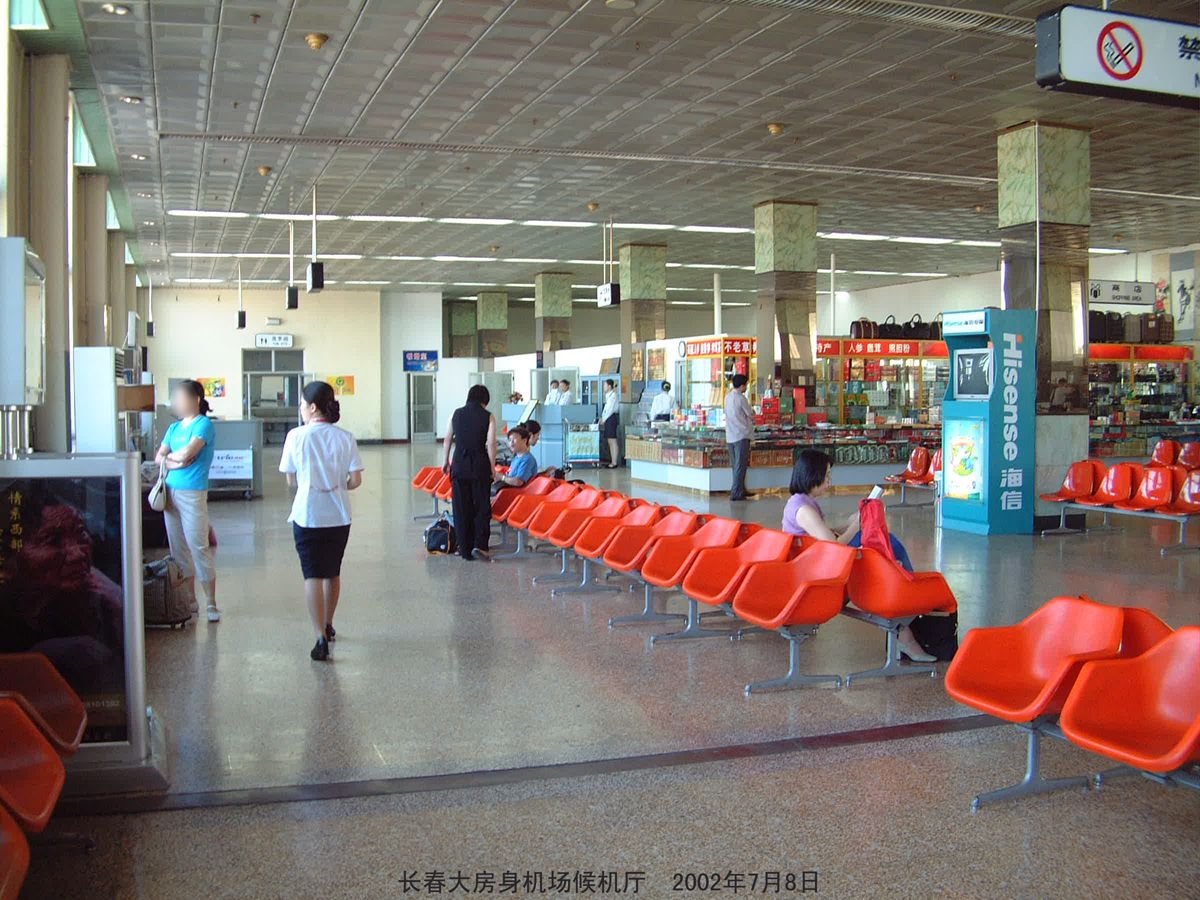
Departure Hall in 2002.

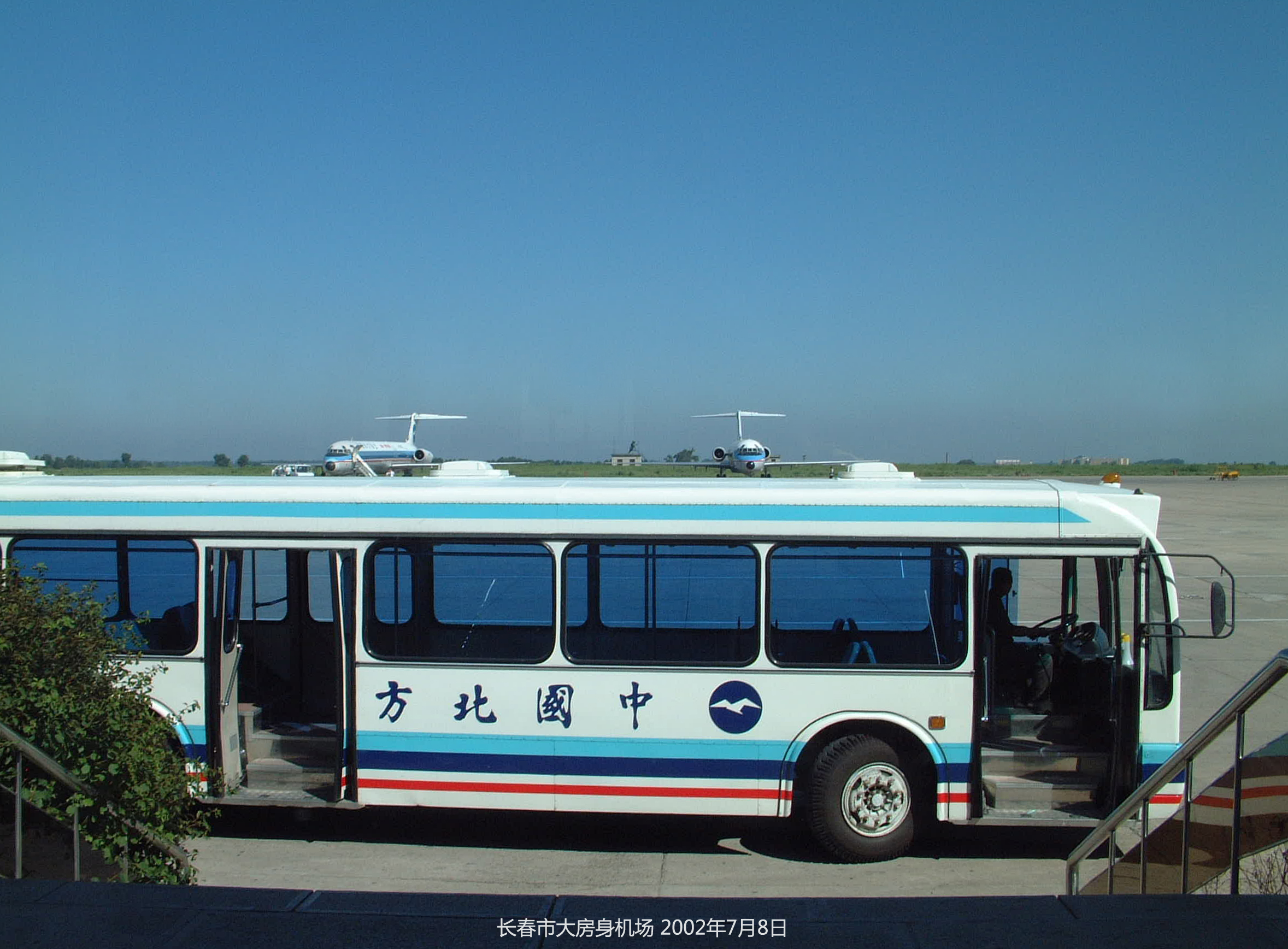
The airport tarmac in 2002, with several China Northern Airlines MD-82s parked.
