= China Northern Airlines Flight 6136 =

2002 aircraft accident in Bohai Bay

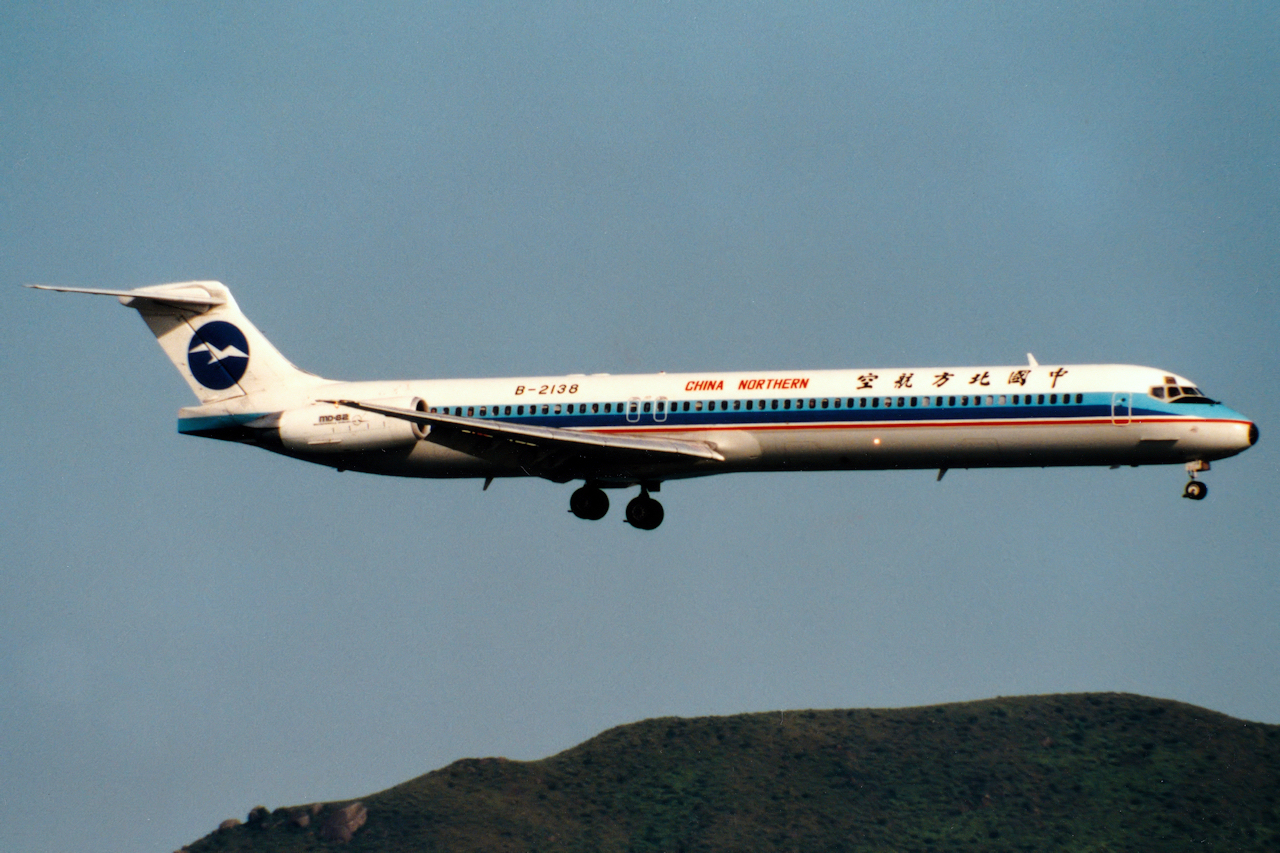
- B-2138, the aircraft involved in the accident, pictured in 1998

Occurrence
- Date: 7 May 2002
- Summary: Loss of control due to in-flight arson
- Site: Bohai Bay, near Dalian Zhoushuizi International Airport, Dalian, Liaoning, China; 39°N 121.8°E

Aircraft
- Aircraft type: McDonnell Douglas MD-82
- Operator: China Northern Airlines
- IATA flight No.: CJ6136
- ICAO flight No.: CBF6136
- Call sign: CHINA NORTHERN 6136
- Registration: B-2138
- Flight origin: Beijing Capital International Airport
- Destination: Dalian Zhoushuizi International Airport
- Occupants: 112
- Passengers: 103
- Crew: 9
- Fatalities: 112
- Survivors: 0

China Northern Airlines Flight 6136 (CBF6136/CJ6136) was a Chinese domestic passenger flight from Beijing Capital International Airport to Dalian Zhoushuizi International Airport. On 7 May 2002, the McDonnell Douglas MD-80 operating the flight crashed into the bay near Dalian shortly after the pilot reported fire on board, killing all 103 passengers and 9 crew members. The cause of the fire was later determined to be arson.

== Aircraft ==
The aircraft involved was a McDonnell Douglas MD-82 with the registration B-2138. It had been built in 1991 and had accumulated about 27,000 hours of flight time in service. According to senior official of the General Administration of the Civil Aviation of China, Yang Yuanyuan, the aircraft had just undergone its routine maintenance check and had a perfect maintenance record.

== Flight ==
The plane left its boarding gate at Beijing Capital International Airport at 20:22 and took off at 20:37 local time (12:37 UTC) from Runway 36R. At 21:20, as the aircraft neared Dalian, the captain reported "fire in cabin" and "the tail is on fire" to Dalian tower and requested an emergency landing. At 21:24 the aircraft disappeared from the radar screen and lost contact with air traffic control. It was due to arrive in Dalian at 21:40. The aircraft crashed in the water at a 90 degree bank angle and 30 degree nose down pitch. Witnesses stated that the aircraft made several circles before suddenly plunging into the sea with its light out.

Emergency services were immediately deployed after the crash. Chinese Navy forces stationed in Dalian deployed four naval ships into the crash site. More than 30 tug boats joined the search and rescue mission. Rescuers immediately recovered 60 bodies and debris from the crash site, including a badly burned food cart. President Jiang Zemin and Premier Zhu Rongji ordered aviation, police and transport agencies and the Chinese military to fully organize and support the rescue efforts.

On May 8, Chinese search and rescue personnel detected signals from the flight recorders. Dalian authorities sent 51 divers to 17 different locations to find the flight recorders of the plane. On 10 May, weak signals were detected by salvage workers. They also recovered a 15-metre section of the plane from the sea. On May 14, seven days after the disaster, the two flight recorders were retrieved from the seabed by searchers.

== Passengers and crew ==
Nationality	Passengers	Crew	Total
China	96	9	105
Japan	3	0	3
France	1	0	1
India	1	0	1
Singapore	1	0	1
South Korea	1	0	1
Total	103	9	112

Of the 103 passengers, 96 were from China; three were Japanese; and the remaining four were from France, India, Singapore and South Korea. 100 of the passengers were adults while 3 were children. Most of the passengers were residents of Dalian.

The Captain was Wang Yongxiang. (Note: Chinese: 王永祥; pinyin: Wáng Yǒngxiáng) aged 35, and had more than 11,000 total flying hours. The First Officer was Chen Xiuming. (Note: simplified Chinese: 陈旭明; traditional Chinese: 陳旭明; pinyin: Chén Xùmíng) aged 29, and had accumulated more than 3,300 total flying hours. The second officer was 25 year old Pan Mintsi, (Note: Chinese: 潘明奇; pinyin: Pān Míngqí) with a total flying time of 4,980 hours.

== Investigation ==
The Chinese Government immediately ordered an investigation into the cause of the crash. A special investigation panel sent by the central government later arrived in Dalian. The panel consisted of vice secretary-general of the State Council Long Quan; heads of the Ministry of Communications, the General Administration of Civil Aviation, the Ministry of Public Security, and the National Transportation Safety Board (NTSB) of the United States.

In the immediate aftermath of the disaster, in-flight fire was suspected as the main cause of the crash. This was confirmed by the crew's emergency call to ATC about the presence of fire on board the aircraft. Multiple witnesses also supported this theory. The possibility of an in-flight fire became higher after rescuers retrieved a badly burnt food cart on the crash site.

Chinese provincial papers stated that a short-circuit might have caused the fire.

In response to the crash of Air China Flight 129 and China Northern Airlines Flight 6136, CAAC official Yuanyuan stated that China's air safety reform would be delayed.

Findings of the accident investigation were published by the Xinhua News Agency on December 8, 2002. A passenger named Zhang Pilin (Note: Chinese: 张丕林; pinyin: Zhāng Pīlín) apparently set fire to the passenger cabin with gasoline, causing a loss of control and crash. Zhang had purchased seven air insurance policies worth a total of 1,400,000 renminbi (about 170,000 USD) prior to boarding the flight.

The investigation of the wreckage showed a quantity of gasoline near Zhang's seat, and that most passengers, including Zhang, died of carbon monoxide inhalation. The engines, cabin floor, and other critical parts showed no signs of burning or explosion.

Further investigation showed that Zhang had flown from Dalian to Beijing and returned to Dalian on Flight 6136 the same day. According to security camera recordings, he had spent several hours smoking cigarettes in the waiting hall of Beijing airport. Zhang purchased two insurance policies before leaving Dalian and purchased the remaining five in Beijing. Some water bottles filled with gasoline were also found in Zhang's apartment. The investigation also showed that Zhang was married, had a son, ran his own company, and was in a large amount of debt.

== See also ==
- 2002 in aviation
- Aviation safety
- Continental Airlines Flight 11 – In-flight bombing caused by insurance fraud
