= China Xinjiang Airlines =

Airline of China (1985–2003)

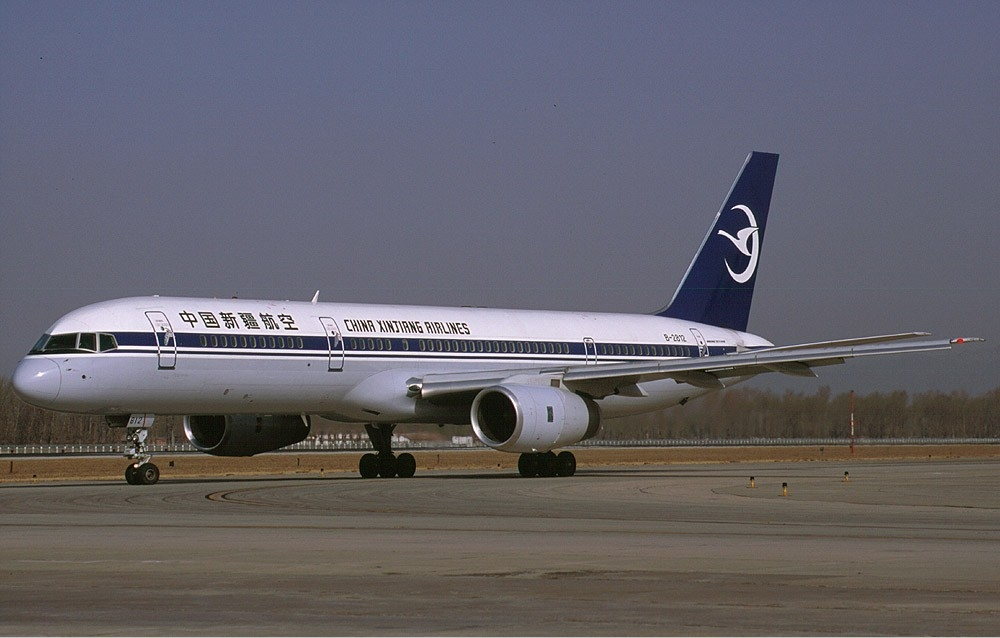
- China Xinjiang Airlines Boeing 757-200
IATA	ICAO	Call sign
XO	CXJ	XINJIANG
- Founded: 1 January 1985
- Ceased operations: March 2003 (merged with China Southern Airlines)
- Hubs: Ürümqi Diwopu International Airport
- Secondary hubs: Changzhou Benniu International Airport
- Fleet size: 25 (2000)
- Destinations: 35 (2000)
- Headquarters: Ürümqi, Xinjiang, China
- Key people: Zhang Ruifu (president)
- Employees: 4,597 (2000)

China Xinjiang Airlines (simplified Chinese: 中国新疆航空公司; traditional Chinese: 中國新疆航空公司; pinyin: Zhōngguó Xīnjiāng Hángkōng Gōngsī) was a Chinese airline owned by CAAC. It was based in Ürümqi Diwopu International Airport in Ürümqi, Xinjiang and had a secondary hub in Changzhou Benniu International Airport in Changzhou, Jiangsu province.

The airline was absorbed by China Southern Airlines in 2003.

== History ==
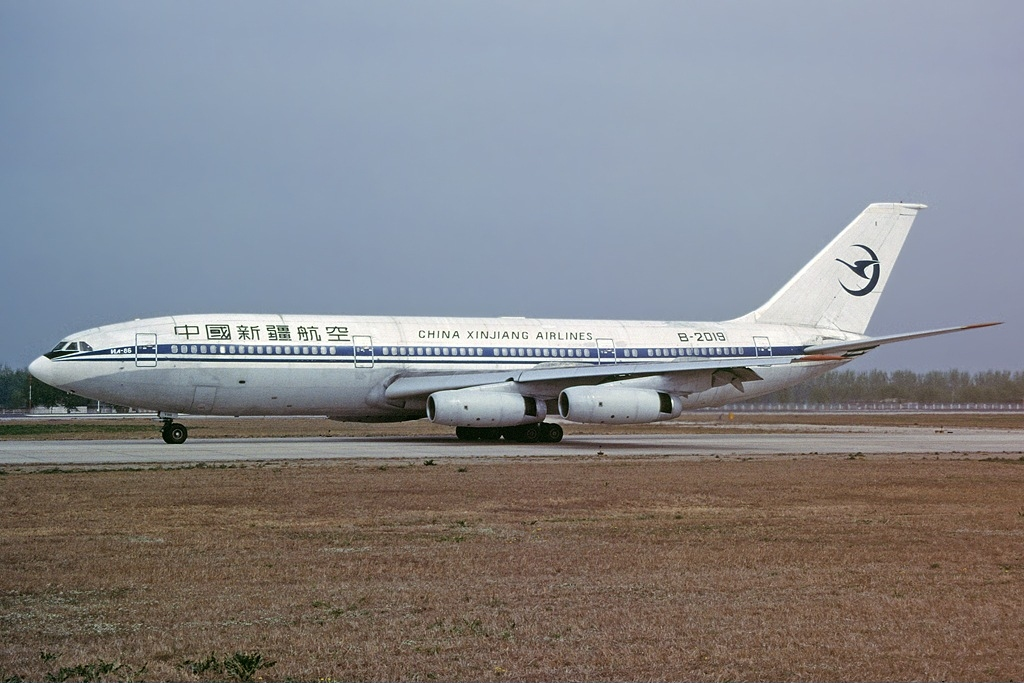
A China Xinjiang Airlines Ilyushin Il-86 at Beijing Capital Airport in 1999.

The airline was established as a detachment of the CAAC Xinjiang Regional Authority; it started operations on 1 January 1985.

In late 1993 the airline took ownership of the first of five 72-seater ATR 72s that had been ordered in May the same year. This event was a milestone for China Xinjiang Airlines as it became the first Chinese airline in taking delivery and operating ATR aircraft. In April 1995, Xinjiang Airlines was evenly owned by CAAC and the Xinjiang Province and it had a fleet of two Antonov An-24s, two DHC-6 Twin Otters, one Ilyushin Il-86, eight SAP Y-8s and six Tupolev Tu-154Ms. (Note: At this time Flight International had not yet accounted for the ATR aircraft the airline took possession of since 1993.) Five years later, the president position was held by Zhang Ruifu, who employed 4,597. At this time, Almaty, Beijing, Changsha, Changzhou, Chengdu, Chongqing, Dalian, Fuzhou, Guangzhou, Guilin, Haikou, Hangzhou, Harbin, Hong Kong, Islamabad, Jinan, Karamay, Korla, Kunming, Lanzhou, Moscow, Novosibirsk, Qingdao, Shanghai, Shenyang, Shenzhen, Tashkent, Tianjin, Wuhan, Xi'an, Xiamen, Xining, Yantai and Zhengzhou comprised the scheduled destination network. In 2001, Boeing 737-400s were deployed on a new route linking Urumqi with Hong Kong.

China Southern Airlines (CZ) integrated both China Northern Airlines and China Xinjiang Airlines into its operations; the takeover had been approved by the Chinese authorities in October 2002. China Xinjiang Airlines IATA's code "XO" became replaced with the CZ one for domestic operations in early 2003.

== Fleet ==
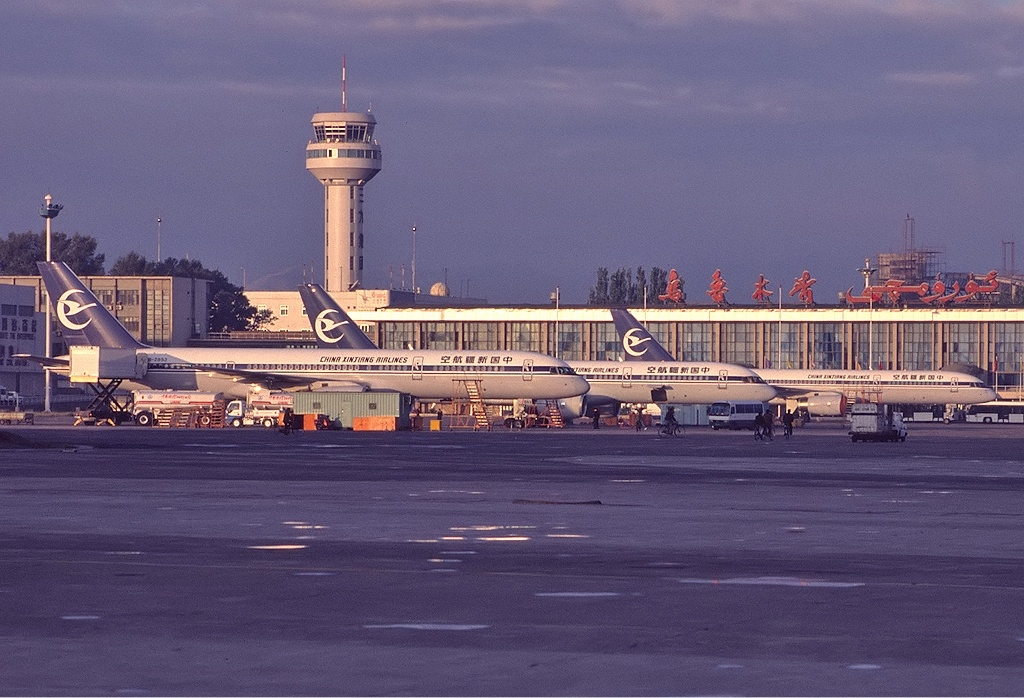
China Xinjiang Airlines Boeing 757 at Ürümqi Airport in 1999.

China Xinjiang Airlines operated the following aircraft:

China Xinjiang Airlines fleet history
Aircraft	Total	Introduced	Retired	Notes
ATR 72-500	5	1997	2003	Transferred to China Southern Airlines
Antonov An-24RV	2	Unknown	Unknown	
Boeing 737-300	2	1993	2003	Two transferred to China Southern Airlines
Boeing 737-400	Unknown	Unknown	Unknown	
Boeing 737-700	4	2001	2003	Transferred to China Southern Airlines
Boeing 757-200	9	1997	2003	Transferred to China Southern Airlines
DHC-6 Twin Otter	2	Unknown	Unknown	
Ilyushin Il-86	1	1993	2003	
Tupolev Tu-154M	6	1986	2001	
SAP Y-8	8	Unknown	Unknown	
