= Dalian Jinzhouwan International Airport =

Future airport to serve Dalian, Liaoning, China

Dalian Jinzhouwan International Airport 大连金州湾国际机场
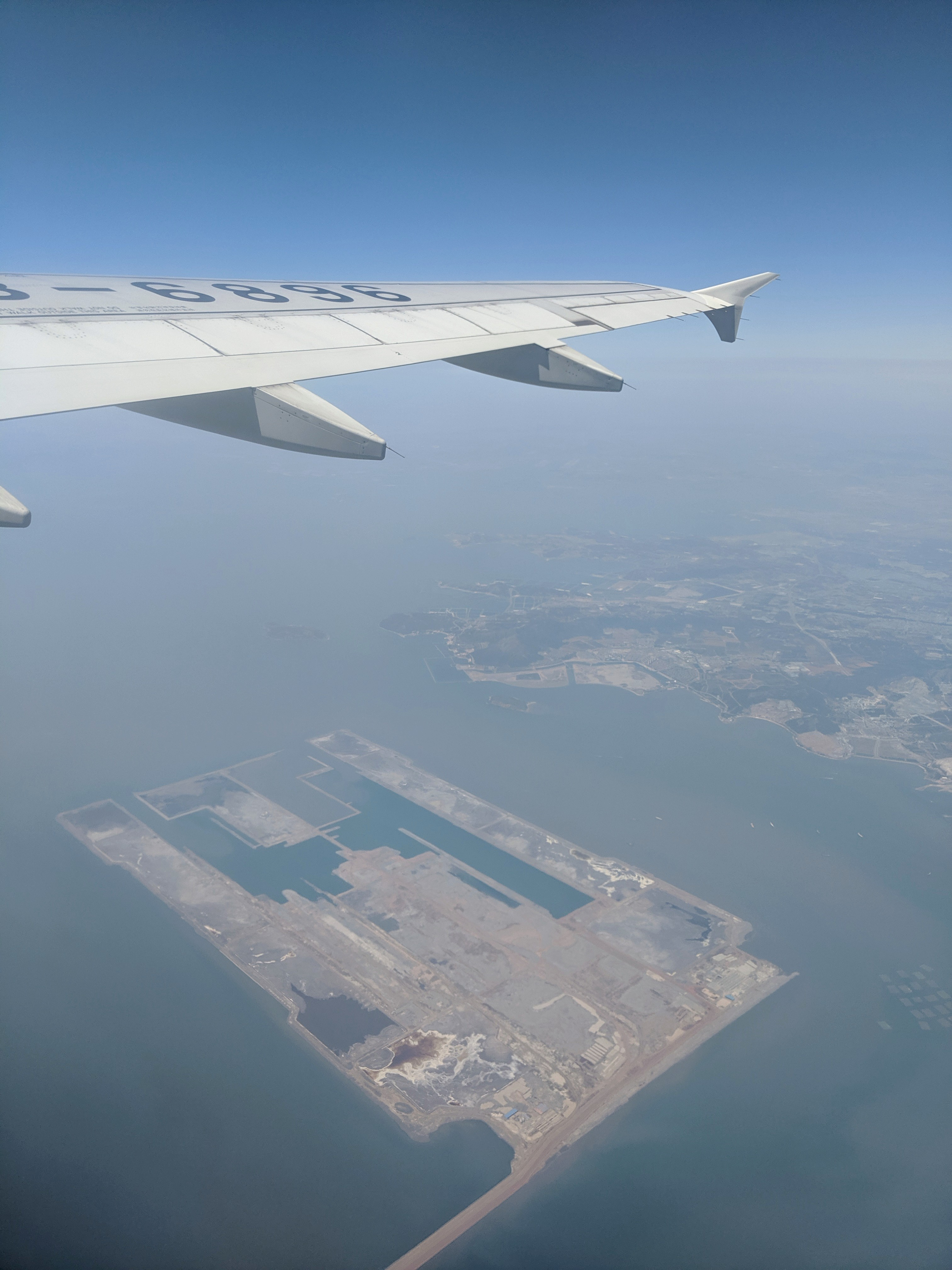
- IATA: DLC (once opened); ICAO: ZYTL (once opened)

Summary
- Airport type: Public
- Serves: Dalian, Liaoning
- Location: Jinzhou Bay
- Coordinates: 39°06′32″N 121°36′56″E

Map
- Location in Liaoning Jinzhouwan Airport (China)

Dalian Jinzhouwan International Airport
- Simplified Chinese: 大连金州湾国际机场
- Traditional Chinese: 大連金州灣國際機場
Transcriptions
Standard Mandarin
- Hanyu Pinyin: Dàlián Jīnzhōuwān Guójì Jīchǎng

Dalian Jinzhouwan International Airport (IATA: DLC, ICAO: ZYTL) is an international airport being built to serve the city of Dalian in Northeast China's Liaoning province. Once open, it will replace the existing Dalian Zhoushuizi International Airport as the city's main airport. It is being built on a 21 square kilometres (8.1 sq mi) of reclaimed land off the coast of Dalian. Expected to be completed and fully operational by 2030, it is set to become the world's largest offshore airport.

== Background ==
Dalian is currently served by Dalian Zhoushuizi International Airport, which has been used for both military and commercial flights since 1924, when Dalian was Japan's leased territory. As air traffic skyrocketed, the airport was expanded five times, in 1984, 1992-1993, 1999, 2005, and 2011-2012, and served almost 20 million passengers in 2025, ranking 27th in China. Due to Dalian's rapid expansion, the airport is now surrounded by built-up urban area and has no more room to grow. As a result, the authorities launched the Jinzhouwan Airport project, which was included in the 12th national five-year plan in 2011.

== Construction ==
The airport project was officially announced in 2012, but construction had already begun in April 2011. It is being built on 21 square kilometres (8.1 sq mi) of reclaimed land in Jinzhou Bay, off the coast of Dalian, and is set to become the world's largest offshore airport. It will become the first airport in mainland China built on an artificial island The airport is designed to handle the Airbus A380, the largest passenger jet, and is projected to cost 26.3 billion yuan (US$4.3 billion) to build. While the airport was originally planned to open in 2018, as of 2020, construction appeared to have been stalled in the land reclamation phase since 2016.

In 2014, Chinese media reported that the airport had not received the necessary approval from the national government, even though construction had already begun three years prior to the announcement. Some experts criticized its cost, warning that the cost of constructing and maintaining runways on reclaimed land could be 20 times more than inland airports.

The project has officially entered the national review phase in March 2021, and the airport is expected to open to the public in 2030.

== Facilities ==
The airport is being built in two stages. The first stage comprises a 400,000-square-metre (4,300,000 sq ft) terminal building and two runways, and is designed to handle 31 million passengers and 650,000 tons of cargo per year. Two more runways will be built in the second phase (class 4F), and once completed, the airport will have the capacity to handle 70 million passengers a year, as well as 1 million tons of cargo each year.

== See also ==
- List of airports in China
- List of the busiest airports in China
