= Suifenhe Dongning Airport =

Suifenhe Dongning Airport 绥芬河东宁机场
- IATA: HSF; ICAO: ZYSD

Summary
- Airport type: Public
- Serves: Suifenhe, Heilongjiang, China
- Coordinates: 44°27′14″N 130°50′38″E

Map
- Location of airport in Heilongjiang

Runways
| Direction | Length | | Surface |
| Direction | m | ft | Surface |
|---|---|---|---|
| 13/31 | 2,500 | 8,202 |

Suifenhe Dongning Airport
- Simplified Chinese: 绥芬河东宁机场
- Traditional Chinese: 綏芬河東寧機場
Transcriptions
Standard Mandarin
- Hanyu Pinyin: Suífēnhé Dōngníng Jīchǎng

Suifenhe Dongning Airport (IATA: HSF, ICAO: ZYSD) is an airport located in Suiyang town of Dongning county-city in Heilongjiang province of Northeast China, in 24 km to the west from Suifenhe city near the Russian border. The field verification test flight was carried out on 16 September 2021. The airport opened on 28 December 2024.

== Facilities ==
The airport has a 2,500-meter runway, a 4,500-square-meter terminal building, and 14 aircraft parking places. It is designed to handle 450,000 passengers and 3,600 tons of cargo annually by 2025.

== Airports and destinations ==
| Airlines | Destinations |
|---|---|
| Air China | Beijing–Capital, Dalian |

== See also ==
- List of airports in China
- List of the busiest airports in China
