= Angel Air =

Charter airline of Thailand (1998–2003)

Angel Airlines
| IATA | ICAO | Call sign |
|---|---|---|
| 8G | NGE | ANGEL AIR |
- Founded: 1997
- Commenced operations: 1998
- Ceased operations: 2003
- Hubs: Don Mueang International Airport
- Focus cities: Chiang Mai International Airport
- Headquarters: Bangkok, Thailand

Angel Airlines (Thai: แอนเจิลแอร์ไลน์), trading as Angel Air, was an airline based in Bangkok, Thailand, which was operational between 1998 and 2003.

== Destinations ==
Over the years, Angel Airlines flew to the following destinations:

| Country/Territory | City/Region | Airport | Notes | Refs |
|---|---|---|---|---|
| Hong Kong | Hong Kong | Hong Kong International Airport | | |
| Laos | Luang Prabang | Luang Prabang International Airport | | |
| Singapore | Singapore | Changi Airport | | |
| Thailand | Bangkok | Don Mueang International Airport | Hub | |
| Thailand | Chiang Mai | Chiang Mai International Airport | Focus city | |
| Thailand | Udon Thani | Udon Thani International Airport | | |
| Thailand | Phuket | Phuket International Airport | | |
| Thailand | Chiang Rai | Chiang Rai International Airport | | |
| Thailand | Khon Kaen | Khon Kaen Airport | | |

== Fleet ==
Over the years, Angel Airlines operated the following aircraft types:

Angel Airlines fleet development
| Aircraft | Introduced | Retired |
|---|---|---|
| Airbus A300 | 2000 | 2002 |
| Boeing 737-400 | 1999 | 2002 |
| Boeing 737-500 | 1998 | 1999 |
| Lockheed L-1011 | 2000 | |
