= Dalian Zhoushuizi International Airport =

Airport serving Dalian, Liaoning, China

Dalian Zhoushuizi International Airport 大连周水子国际机场

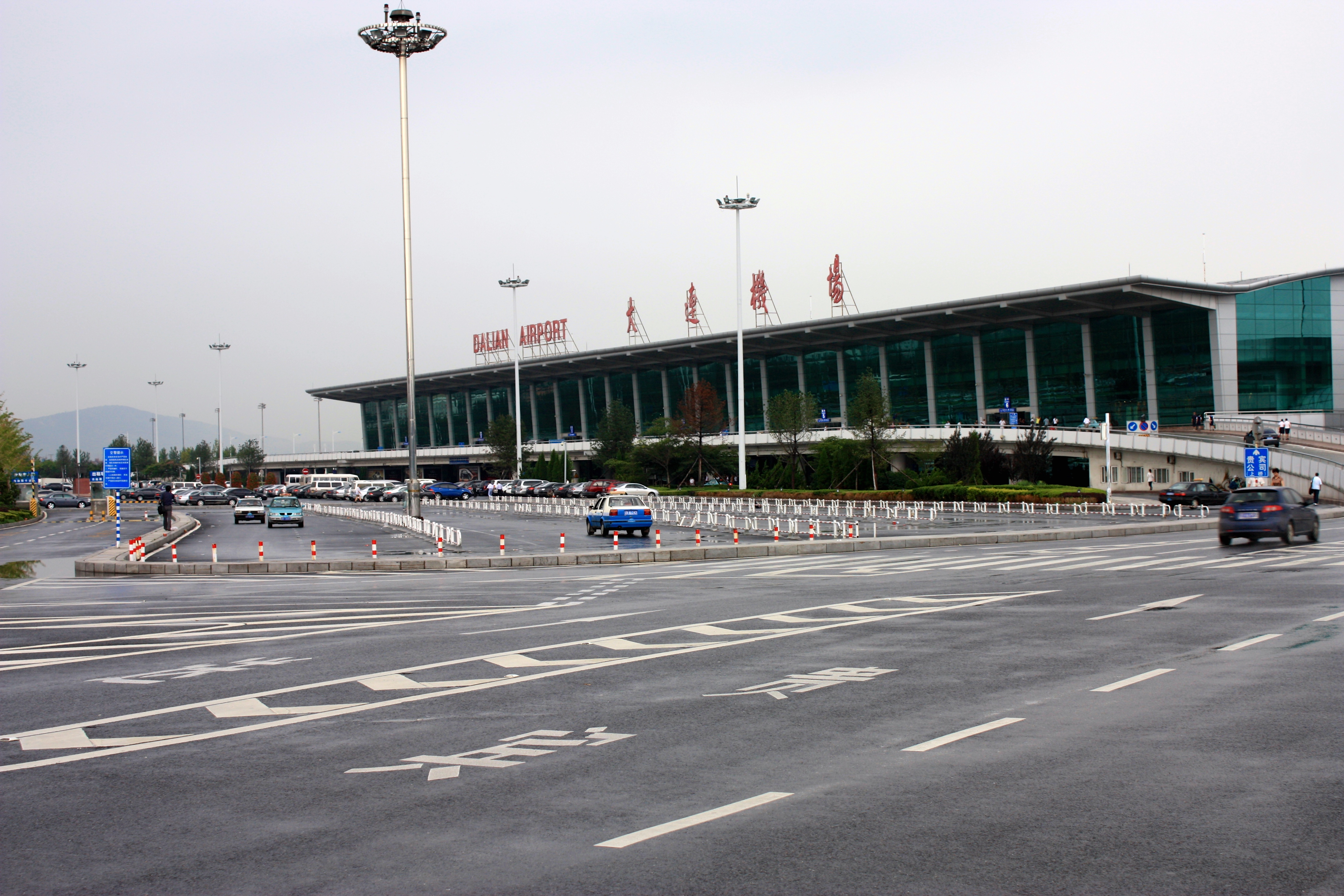
- Dalian Zhoushuizi International Airport
- IATA: DLC; ICAO: ZYTL

Summary
- Airport type: Public
- Operator: Dalian Zhoushuizi International Airport Co., Ltd.
- Serves: Dalian
- Location: Ganjingzi District, Dalian, Liaoning, China
- Opened: 1927
- Elevation AMSL: 33 m (108 ft)
- Coordinates: 38°57′56″N 121°32′18″E
- Website: www.dlairport.com

Maps
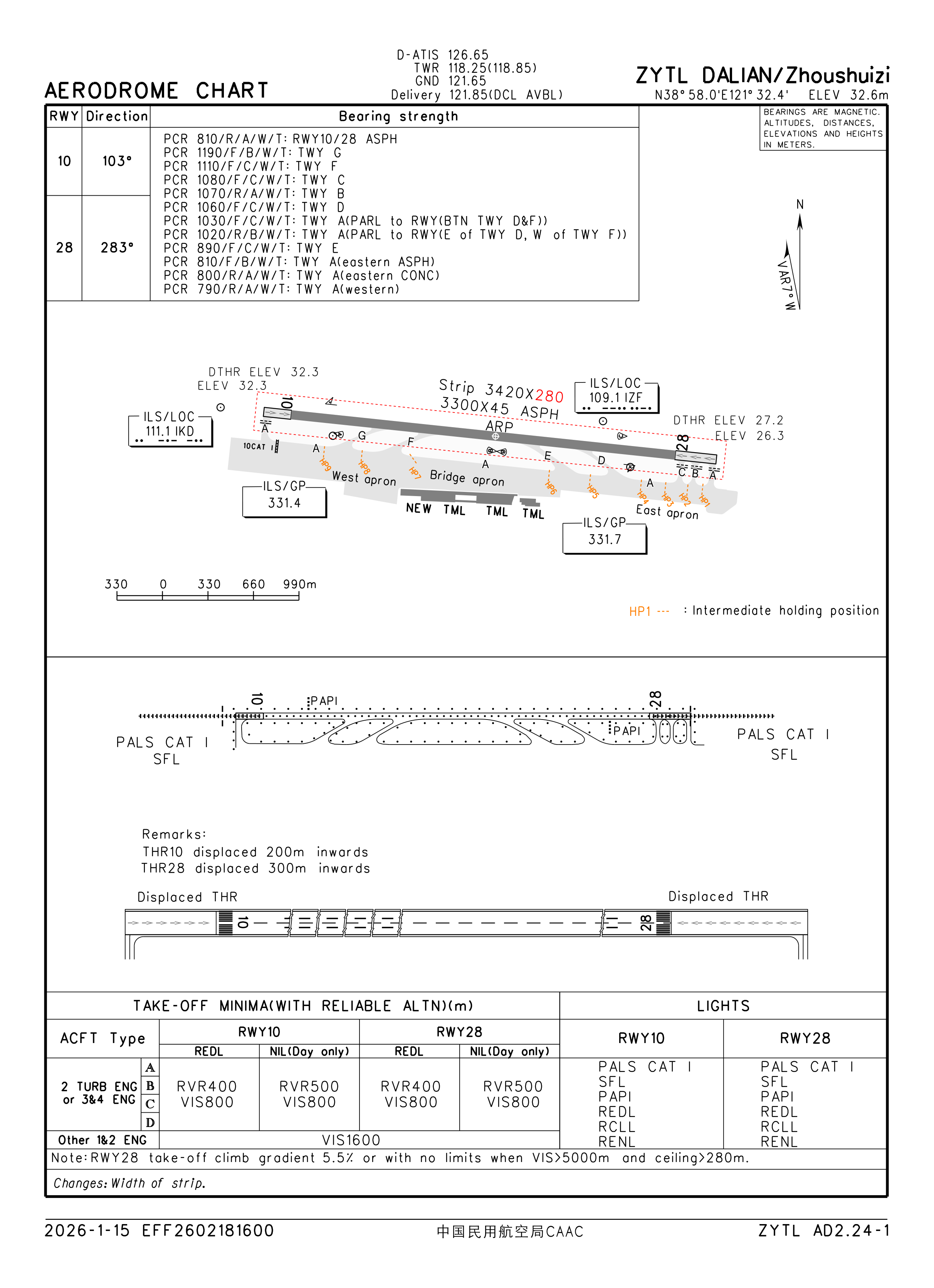
- CAAC airport chart

- Location in Liaoning Location in China

Runways
Direction	Length		Surface
Direction	m	ft	Surface
10/28	3,300	10,827	Asphalt

Statistics (2025)
- Passengers: 19,787,716 ▲2.6%
- Cargo (in tons): 171,653.3 ▲6.8%
- Aircraft movements: 143,447 ▼0.7%
- Source: China's busiest airports by passenger traffic

Dalian Zhoushuizi International Airport
- Simplified Chinese: 大连周水子国际机场
- Traditional Chinese: 大連周水子國際機場
Transcriptions
Standard Mandarin
- Hanyu Pinyin: Dàlián Zhōushuǐzi Guójì Jīchǎng

Dalian Zhoushuizi International Airport (IATA: DLC, ICAO: ZYTL) is an international airport serving the city of Dalian in Northeast China's Liaoning province. It is located in Ganjingzi District, about 10 km (6.2 mi) northwest of the city center. In 2025, the airport handled 19,787,716 passengers, making it the busiest airport in Northeast China and the 27th busiest nationwide. The airport is the hub for Dalian Airlines and a focus city for China Southern Airlines and Hainan Airlines. As Zhoushuizi Airport has reached its designed capacity, the new Dalian Jinzhouwan International Airport is being built on an artificial island in Ganjingzi District to replace it.

== History ==
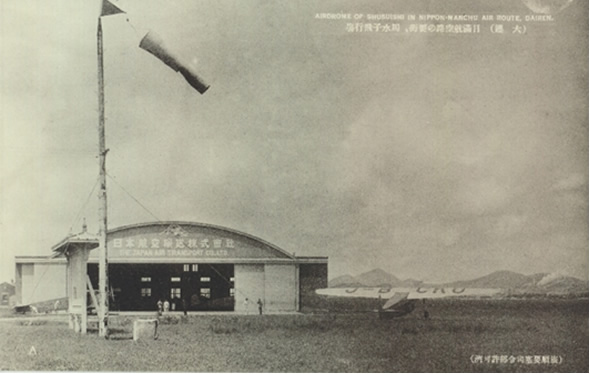
Zhoushuizi Airport in 1928-1938

Zhoushuizi was originally an insect-infested marsh, called "Choushuizi" (臭水子) or "smelly waters" by nearby residents. During the late Qing dynasty, it became a racecourse for horse racing. After the marsh was drained, it was renamed Zhoushuizi (Zhou's waters) after a nearby village called Zhoujiatun ("Zhou family village").

After Japan won the Russo-Japanese War in 1905, the Liaodong Peninsula, including Dalian, came under Japanese occupation. In 1924, the Japanese began to convert Zhoushuizi Racecourse into an airport, which was opened in 1927. Immediately after the aviation law of 1927, the Japanese Ministry of Posts and Telecommunications began planning for scheduled air routes including Tokyo to Dalian (Zhoushuizi). As civil aviation developed later, a few flights per day by Manchukuo National Airways came to Zhoushuizi. After the start of the Second Sino-Japanese War in 1937, there was more military traffic by the Imperial Japanese Navy than civil traffic, mostly using Douglas DC-3. Zhoushuizi Airport at that time was about 800 meters (2,625 ft) long and 400 meters (1,312 ft) wide.

After the surrender of Japan in 1945, Zhoushuizi was under the control of the Soviet Air Forces for ten years, until it was transferred to the Chinese PLA Air Force in May 1955. In 1973, the military Zhoushuizi airfield was converted into a small civil airport, with a 2,040-meter (6,693 ft)-long runway and 37 employees, serving 1,961 passengers a year.

As air traffic skyrocketed starting in the 1980s and especially since the 1990s, the airport had its first major expansion in April 1984. It was then expanded four more times, in 1992–93, 1999, 2005, and 2011–12. It served more than 13 million passengers in 2012, ranking 15th in China. Because of the expansion of the city of Dalian, the airport is now surrounded by built-up urban area and has no more room to grow as it reached its capacity in 2016. As a result, the authorities launched the new Dalian Jinzhouwan International Airport project, which was included in the 12th national five-year plan in 2011.

== Facilities ==
In September 2011, a new 71,000 square-meter terminal building was completed as part of the 2.2 billion yuan third-phase expansion project of the airport. The airport has a 3,300-meter (10,827 ft) runway (class 4E), 135,000 square metres (1,450,000 sq ft) of terminal buildings, 42 aircraft parking places, and 2,600 car parking places. The entire airport covers an area of 3,450,000 square metres (37,100,000 sq ft).

== Airlines and destinations ==
As a focus city for China Southern Airlines, Dalian has many of China Southern's Japanese destinations. China's flag carrier, Air China, also makes a stop-over at Dalian on its flights from Beijing to Japan. Due to the tight connection and high demand between Dalian and Japan, Japan Airlines still operates daily direct flight from Narita Airport in Tokyo to Dalian. Two major South Korean airlines, Korean Air and Asiana Airlines, operate daily flight to Dalian from Incheon Airport in Seoul. The majority of international flights are operated by China Southern Airlines, Air China, Japan Airlines, All Nippon Airways, Asiana Airlines, Korean Air and Uni Air.

=== Passenger ===
Airlines	Destinations
9 Air	Guangzhou, Shangrao, Weifang, Wuhan
Aeroflot	Seasonal: Vladivostok
Air Chang'an	Tangshan, Xi'an
Air China	Beijing–Capital, Changsha, Chengdu–Shuangliu, Chengdu–Tianfu, Fukuoka, Fuzhou, Guiyang, Haikou, Hiroshima, Hong Kong, Jinan, Kunming, Sendai, Shiyan, Suifenhe, Tianjin, Tokyo–Narita
Air Guilin	Changzhi, Guilin, Wuhu, Xiangyang
All Nippon Airways	Tokyo–Narita
Asiana Airlines	Seoul–Incheon
Chengdu Airlines	Nanjing
China Eastern Airlines	Beijing–Daxing, Changsha, Changzhou, Chaoyang, Chengdu–Tianfu, Guiyang, Harbin, Hefei, Jiagedaqi, Kitakyushu, Kuala Lumpur–International, Kunming, Lianyungang, Luoyang, Nanchang, Nanjing, Ningbo, Qingdao, Qiqihar, Shanghai–Pudong, Shijiazhuang, Taiyuan, Tonghua, Wuhan, Xi'an, Yichun (Heilongjiang), Yinchuan, Yulin (Shaanxi)
China Express Airlines	Changzhi, Chengdu–Tianfu, Chongqing, Handan, Jixi, Quzhou, Tianjin, Xuzhou
China Flying Dragon Aviation	Changhai
China Southern Airlines	Beijing–Daxing, Changbaishan, Changsha, Chengdu–Tianfu, Cheongju, Chongqing, Dali, Daqing, Guangzhou, Guiyang, Haikou, Hangzhou, Hengyang, Jeju, Jiamusi, Jieyang, Kunming, Meixian, Mudanjiang, Nagoya–Centrair, Nanjing, Nanyang, Ningbo, Qingdao, Sanya, Sapporo–Chitose, Seoul–Incheon, Shanghai–Pudong, Shenzhen, Shijiazhuang,, Taiyuan, Tianjin, Tokyo–Narita, Urumqi, Wuhan, Xiamen, Xi'an, Yangzhou, Zhengzhou; Seasonal: Yanji
Chongqing Airlines	Chongqing, Linyi
Dalian Airlines	Beijing–Capital, Beijing–Daxing, Chengdu–Shuangliu, Guiyang, Hangzhou, Kunming, Shanghai–Pudong, Tianjin
Donghai Airlines	Bengbu, Lianyungang, Shenzhen
Fuzhou Airlines	Fuzhou, Taiyuan, Zhoushan
GX Airlines	Ganzhou, Fuyang, Luoyang, Nanning
Hainan Airlines	Beijing–Capital, Changsha, Dongying, Guangzhou, Guiyang, Haikou, Hangzhou, Hefei, Kunming, Lanzhou, Nanchang, Nanjing, Nanning, Ningbo, Rizhao, Sanya, Shanghai–Pudong, Shenzhen, Shihezi, Shijiazhuang, Taiyuan, Tianjin, Vladivostok, Xi'an, Yichun (Jiangxi), Zhengzhou, Zhuhai; Seasonal: Manzhouli, Songyuan
Hunnu Air	Ulaanbaatar
IrAero	Seasonal charter: Khabarovsk
Japan Airlines	Tokyo–Haneda
Juneyao Air	Liuzhou, Nanjing, Shanghai–Pudong, Wuhan, Zhangjiajie; Seasonal: Hailar
Korean Air	Seoul–Incheon
LJ Air	Changsha, Linfen
Loong Air	Changzhou, Chengdu–Tianfu, Fuzhou, Hangzhou, Heze, Quanzhou, Wuxi, Xuzhou
Lucky Air	Kunming, Lijiang, Yancheng, Zhengzhou
Okay Airways	Tianjin
Qingdao Airlines	Chengdu–Tianfu, Qingdao, Zhengzhou
Ruili Airlines	Kunming, Wenzhou
Shandong Airlines	Chongqing, Guiyang, Jiansanjiang, Jinan, Mudanjiang, Qingdao, Xiamen, Zhuhai
Shanghai Airlines	Mudanjiang, Rizhao, Shanghai–Pudong
Shenzhen Airlines	Changzhou, Chengdu–Tianfu, Guangzhou, Nanchang, Nantong, Shenzhen, Zhengzhou
Sichuan Airlines	Chengdu–Tianfu, Chongqing, Kunming
Spring Airlines	Ankang, Beihai, Changzhou, Fukuoka, Fuzhou, Hohhot, Jieyang, Jinan, Lanzhou, Nagoya–Centrair, Nanchang, Nanjing, Nanning, Ningbo, Osaka–Kansai, Shanghai–Pudong, Shenzhen, Shijiazhuang, Xi'an, Yancheng, Yangzhou, Zhengzhou
Spring Airlines Japan	Tokyo–Narita
Tianjin Airlines	Haikou, Heze, Hohhot, Lanzhou, Lianyungang, Nantong, Ningbo, Shanghai–Pudong, Tangshan, Tianjin, Weihai, Wuhan, Xiamen, Yan'an, Yantai, Yinchuan, Yulin (Shaanxi)
VietJet Air	Charter: Nha Trang
West Air	Haikou,, Zhengzhou
XiamenAir	Bangkok–Suvarnabhumi, Changsha, Chongqing, Fuzhou, Hangzhou, Huai'an, Lanzhou, Nanjing, Quanzhou, Tianjin, Wuhan, Xiamen, Yuncheng, Zhengzhou
Yakutia Airlines	Seasonal charter: Khabarovsk

=== Cargo ===
Airlines	Destinations
Air China Cargo	Frankfurt, Shanghai–Pudong
ANA Cargo	Osaka–Kansai, Tokyo–Narita
China Postal Airlines	Osaka–Kansai
Emirates SkyCargo	Dubai–Al Maktoum

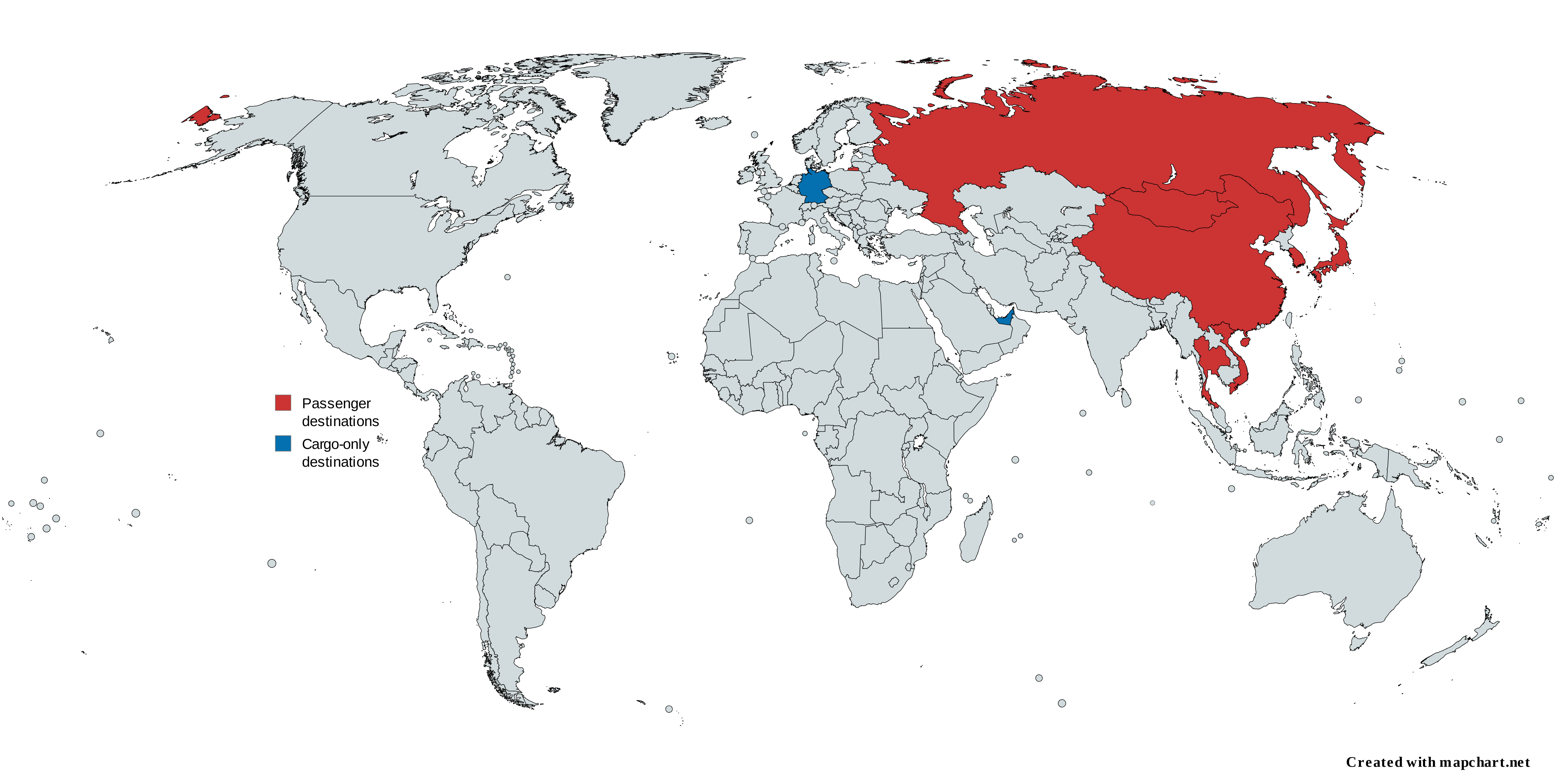
Red for passenger destinations, blue for cargo-only destinations. As of March 2026.

== Ground transportation ==
The airport is served by the Dalian Metro Line 2 and many bus lines to central Dalian. An airport bus line also serves the central district. A taxi hub station is located on the ground level.

== Accidents and incidents ==
On May 7, 2002, China Northern Airlines Flight 6136 was en route from Beijing to Dalian when an arsonist set the aircraft on fire, causing it to lose control and crash in Bohai Bay, killing everyone on board.

== See also ==
- List of airports in China
- List of the busiest airports in China
