= Paul Pindar =

Paul Pindar may refer to:

- Sir Paul Pindar (1565–1650), English merchant and ambassador
- Paul Pindar (businessman) (Paul Richard Martin Pindar, born 1959), English businessman
- Paul Pindar, pseudonym of John Yonge Akerman (1806–1873), English antiquarian and author

== See also ==
- Pindar (disambiguation)
