= Pindar (disambiguation) =

Pindar was an ancient Greek poet.

Pindar may also refer to:

== People ==
- Pindar baronets, a title in the Baronetage of England
- James A. Pindar (1930–1984), American priest, educator and politician
- John S. Pindar (1835–1907), American lawyer and politician
- Sir Paul Pindar (1565–1650), English merchant and ambassador
- Paul Pindar (businessman) (Paul Richard Martin Pindar, born 1959), English businessman
- Paul Pindar, pseudonym of John Yonge Akerman (1806–1873), English antiquarian and author
- Peter Pindar, pseudonym of John Wolcot (c. 1738–1819), and subsequently of C. F. Lawler (fl. 1812–1819), English satirists
- Pindar Cockloft, pseudonym of the publishers of Salmagundi
- Pindar Van Arman (fl. from 2005), American artist and roboticist

== Places ==
- Pindar, a military citadel under London
- Pindar, Western Australia, a town
- Pindar Assembly constituency, Uttarakhand, India
- Pindar River, in India, originating in the Pindari Glacier

== Other uses ==
- Pindar, or peanut
- Pindar, the name of a IMOCA 60 Gartmore yacht

== See also ==
- Pinda (disambiguation)
- Pindar Cave, a geological formation near Sydney, Australia
- GAC Pindar, a professional sailing team
- George Pindar School, in Eastfield, Scarborough, England
