= Trustpilot =

Danish consumer review website

Trustpilot Group plc
- Website type: Public limited company
- Traded as: LSE: TRST
- Founded: 2007; 19 years ago
- Headquarters: Copenhagen, Denmark
- Area served: Global
- Owner: Publicly traded
- Founder: Peter Holten Mühlmann
- Key people: Zillah Byng-Thorne (Chair); Adrian Blair (CEO); Hanno Damm (CFO)
- Revenue: ▲US$261.1 million (2025)
- Operating income: ▲US$16.0 million (2025)
- Net income: ▲US$7.8 million (2025)
- Total assets: ▼US$127.5 million (2025)
- Total equity: ▼US$(6.7) million (2025)
- Employees: c. 1,000 (2025)
- Website: www.trustpilot.com

Trustpilot Group plc, founded in 2007, is a Danish consumer business that operates a review website hosting reviews of businesses worldwide. As of June 2025, Trustpilot hosts 330 million reviews and has 60 million monthly active users. The site offers freemium services to businesses. It has been criticised for its hosting of fake reviews, and for allowing companies to remove negative reviews.

== History ==
Trustpilot was founded in Denmark in 2007 by Peter Holten Mühlmann. At the time, he was studying at Aarhus University, School of Business and Social Sciences and would later leave university to create Trustpilot.

After raising $3 million in early venture funding from 2008 to 2010, Trustpilot received an initial capital injection from SEED Capital Denmark and Northzone in November 2011. One year later, Index Ventures, SEED Capital Denmark and Northzone invested $13 million in Series B funding in Trustpilot, which the company used for international growth.

In 2013, Trustpilot opened offices in New York and London. In the same year, the company was named Danish Startup of the Year at Next Web's European Startup Awards. In 2014, Draper Esprit (then named DFJ Esprit) invested $25 million in Trustpilot, along with support from the existing investors. According to VentureBeat, the Series C funding round would help Trustpilot "bring its online retail reviews service to the U.S." At the end of 2014, Trustpilot employed 325 people and 400,000 new reviews were posted each month. According to Website Magazine, "Trustpilot soared in 2014," and experienced "record growth with an 80 percent year-over-year increase in revenue".

In March 2015, Google announced the launch of product ratings in Germany, the UK, and France. In order to do this, Google aggregated data from various European sources, including third-party platforms like Trustpilot. In May of that year, Trustpilot received $73.5 million in Series D funding. The investment was led by Vitruvian Partners with contributions from all existing investors.

In February 2020, the BBC reported that Trustpilot had removed at least 2.2 million fake reviews. Of these, 1.5 million were deleted with fraud protection software and 600,000 were removed manually. Additionally, 469,000 companies reported fake reviews, and around 90,000 fake reviews were removed by consumers. By 2024, Trustpilot removed 4.5 million fake reviews, with 90% of the fake reviews automatically taken down by AI tools.

Trustpilot was listed on the London Stock Exchange in March 2021. In March 2023, Mühlmann announced his resignation as CEO and transitioned to a non-executive board member. He was succeeded by Adrian Blair in July of that year. On 16 September 2025, the company announced a share buyback program worth up to £30 million.

In March 2026, the Italian Competition Authority fined Trustpilot $4.6 million for misleading customers regarding how its services worked and failing to verify review authenticity. The company said that it planned to appeal the decision.

== Products and activities ==
Trustpilot operates a freemium business model and earns most of its revenue from subscription-based customers. The company freely allows businesses to collect and respond to reviews, and also sells marketing tools.

As of June 2025, the company hosts 330 million reviews and has 60 million monthly active users. Trustpilot employs approximately 1,000 people.

== Criticism ==
Independent investigations suggest that platforms like Trustpilot host fake reviews, leading to controversy over their legitimacy and the company's handling of complaints. Trustpilot claims that it strives to only include genuine reviews. Trustpilot featured fake reviews for Bizzyloans; it deleted them after they were brought to light by KwikChex, an online investigations company.

On 14 September 2017, Trustpilot issued an open letter clarifying its review policy following allegations concerning the "validity of reviews of [online estate agent] Purplebricks by customers".

On 22 March 2019, The Times reported that estate agents Purplebricks and Foxtons were "gaming" Trustpilot feedback by paying to help gain better scores. In August 2016, five reviews of Foxtons were published on Trustpilot, with an average score of 2.2 stars out of five. The following month there were 467 reviews, 90% of which awarded five stars. Trustpilot stated that it had found evidence that some companies had attempted to game its system and said it had a "zero tolerance" policy towards such tactics.

On 6 February 2020, industry publication Property Industry Eye reported that Trustpilot was looking into reviews of estate agents "at large" after claims from property review website allAgents that 70% of their reviews could be fake.

=== Hiding negative reviews ===
Paying Trustpilot subscribers using the "Trustbox" feature can filter review scores to only display high-scoring reviews.
