= Pinda =

Pinda may refer to:

== People ==
- Emmanuel Pinda (born 1961), French karate practitioner
- Kingsley Pinda (born 1992), French basketball player
- Mizengo Pinda (born 1948), Prime Minister of Tanzania

== Other uses ==
- Pinda (riceball), rice balls offered to ancestors during Hindu funeral rites and ancestor worship
- Pinda-Boroko, a town in Bondoukou Department, Ivory Coast
- Pinda (plant), a genus of flowering plants
- Gurbaaz Singh "Pinda", a character portrayed by Udaybir Sandhu in 2026 Indian film Dhurandhar: The Revenge

== See also ==
- Pind (disambiguation)
- Pindar (disambiguation)
- Pindi (disambiguation)
- Pindamonhangaba, a city in the state of São Paulo, Brazil (shortened)
