= Skytrax =

UK-based consultancy, running an airline and airport review and ranking site

- Formerly: Inflight Research Services
- Type: Private
- Founded: 1989; 37 years ago
- Headquarters: London, United Kingdom
- Area served: Worldwide
- Key people: Edward Plaisted (CEO)
- Website: skytraxratings.com

Skytrax (originally known as Inflight Research Services) is a United Kingdom-based consultancy headquartered in London that runs an airline and airport review website.

== Services ==
Skytrax conducts research for commercial airlines, as well as taking surveys from international travellers, to rate cabin staff, airports, airlines, airline lounges, in-flight entertainment, on-board catering, and several other elements of air travel. Apart from these evaluations, Skytrax has an airline forum where passengers give potential passengers insights and opinions about airlines. The website also hosts flight reviews, flight checks, and satisfaction surveys. Skytrax holds an annual World Airline Awards and World Airport Awards, as well as ranking airlines and airports.

Skytrax rates individual airlines between one and five stars; they describe a five-star rating as recognising "airlines providing very high standards of Airport and Onboard Product" and "consistent and high standards of staff service across both the airport and onboard service environments". The ten airlines they deem to be five-star rated are:

- (Japan) All Nippon Airways
- (South Korea) Asiana Airlines
- (Hong Kong) Cathay Pacific*
- (Taiwan) EVA Air
- (China) Hainan Airlines
- Japan Airlines*
- (South Korea) Korean Air*
- Qatar Airways*
- Singapore Airlines*
- (Taiwan) Starlux Airlines

Airlines with an asterisk (*) denote flag carriers.

== Investigations ==
In 2012, the online investigations company KwikChex filed five complaints with the UK Advertising Standards Authority (ASA) related to statements on the Skytrax website describing the volume and reliability of their reviews as well as the official status and update frequency of their ratings. The ASA ruled that there was no evidence that Skytrax had followed the robust procedures it claimed it had in place to check that all reviews were genuine. Although Skytrax argued that every review underwent a four-stage authentication process, it said it was unable to provide proof it had followed its own procedures, since customer emails were deleted 24 hours after a review was submitted. In 2012, the authority upheld all five complaints and Skytrax agreed to modify some promotional wording.
