= Kenny Bruce =

Kenny Bruce may refer to:

- Kenny Bruce, co-founder of Purplebricks, a UK based online estate agents
- Kenny Bruce Williams, fictional character in the Left Behind novel series by Tim LaHaye

== See also ==
- Ken Bruce (born 1951), broadcaster on BBC Radio 2 in the UK
