= Pind =

Pind may refer to:

- PIND or Particle Impact Noise Detection
- Søren Pind (born 1969), Danish politician
- Pind (rapper) (born 1996), Danish rapper, record producer, and songwriter
- The transliteration of Punjabi word ਪਿੰਡ, which means village/rurality.

== See also ==
- includes many placenames which include the word
- Pinda (disambiguation)
