= List of Hainan Airlines destinations =

Hainan Airlines serves the following destinations as of June 2025:

== List ==
Country	City	Airport	Notes	Refs
Australia	Brisbane	Brisbane Airport	Terminated	
Australia	Cairns	Cairns Airport	Terminated	
Australia	Melbourne	Melbourne Airport		
Australia	Sydney	Sydney Airport		
Austria	Vienna	Vienna International Airport		
Belgium	Brussels	Brussels Airport		
Canada	Calgary	Calgary International Airport	Terminated	
Canada	Toronto	Toronto Pearson International Airport		
Canada	Vancouver	Vancouver International Airport		
China	Beijing	Beijing Capital International Airport	Hub	
China	Changsha	Changsha Huanghua International Airport	Focus city	
China	Chongqing	Chongqing Jiangbei International Airport	Focus city	
China	Dalian	Dalian Zhoushuizi International Airport		
China	Fuzhou	Fuzhou Changle International Airport		
China	Guangzhou	Guangzhou Baiyun International Airport	Focus city	
China	Guiyang	Guiyang Longdongbao International Airport		
China	Haikou	Haikou Meilan International Airport	Hub	
China	Hangzhou	Hangzhou Xiaoshan International Airport		
China	Hohhot	Hohhot Baita International Airport		
China	Holingol	Holingol Huolinhe Airport		
China	Lanzhou	Lanzhou Zhongchuan International Airport	Focus city	
China	Rizhao	Rizhao Shanzihe Airport		
China	Sanya	Sanya Phoenix International Airport		
China	Shanghai	Shanghai Pudong International Airport		
China	Shenyang	Shenyang Taoxian International Airport		
China	Shenzhen	Shenzhen Bao'an International Airport	Hub	
China	Shijiazhuang	Shijiazhuang Zhengding International Airport		
China	Shihezi	Shihezi Huayuan Airport		
China	Taiyuan	Taiyuan Wusu International Airport	Focus city	
China	Ürümqi	Ürümqi Diwopu International Airport	Focus city	
China	Xiamen	Xiamen Gaoqi International Airport		
China	Xi'an	Xi'an Xianyang International Airport	Hub	
China	Xishuangbanna	Xishuangbanna Gasa International Airport		
China	Yantai	Yantai Penglai International Airport		
China	Yinchuan	Yinchuan Hedong International Airport		
China	Yichun	Yichun Mingyueshan Airport		
China	Zhengzhou	Zhengzhou Xinzheng International Airport		
China	Zhuhai	Zhuhai Jinwan Airport		
Czech Republic	Prague	Václav Havel Airport Prague		
Egypt	Cairo	Cairo International Airport		
France	Paris	Charles de Gaulle Airport		
Germany	Berlin	Berlin Brandenburg Airport		
Germany	Berlin	Berlin Tegel Airport	Airport closed	
Hong Kong	Hong Kong	Hong Kong International Airport		
Hungary	Budapest	Budapest Ferenc Liszt International Airport		
India	Kolkata	Netaji Subhas Chandra Bose International Airport	Terminated	
Indonesia	Denpasar	Ngurah Rai International Airport	Terminated	
Indonesia	Jakarta	Soekarno–Hatta International Airport		
Ireland	Dublin	Dublin Airport		
Israel	Tel Aviv	Ben Gurion Airport		
Italy	Milan	Milan Malpensa Airport		
Italy	Rome	Rome Fiumicino Airport		
Japan	Okinawa	Naha Airport	Terminated	
Japan	Osaka	Kansai International Airport		
Japan	Sapporo	New Chitose Airport		
Japan	Tokyo	Haneda Airport		
Japan	Tokyo	Narita International Airport		
Kazakhstan	Almaty	Almaty International Airport	Terminated	
Kyrgyzstan	Bishkek	Manas International Airport	Terminated	
Laos	Luang Prabang	Luang Prabang International Airport	Terminated	
Laos	Vientiane	Wattay International Airport		
Macau	Macau	Macau International Airport		
Malaysia	Kuala Lumpur	Kuala Lumpur International Airport		
Maldives	Malé	Velana International Airport	Terminated	
Mexico	Mexico City	Mexico City International Airport		
Mexico	Tijuana	Tijuana International Airport		
Myanmar	Mandalay	Mandalay International Airport	Terminated	
New Zealand	Auckland	Auckland Airport		
Norway	Oslo	Oslo Airport, Gardermoen		
Philippines	Cebu	Mactan–Cebu International Airport	Terminated	
Russia	Chita	Chita-Kadala International Airport	Terminated	
Russia	Irkutsk	International Airport Irkutsk		
Russia	Krasnoyarsk	Krasnoyarsk International Airport	Terminated	
Russia	Moscow	Sheremetyevo International Airport		
Russia	Novosibirsk	Tolmachevo Airport	Terminated	
Russia	Saint Petersburg	Pulkovo Airport		
Russia	Vladivostok	Vladivostok International Airport		
Samoa	Apia	Faleolo International Airport	Terminated	
Saudi Arabia	Jeddah	King Abdulaziz International Airport		
Serbia	Belgrade	Belgrade Nikola Tesla Airport		
Singapore	Singapore	Changi Airport		
Spain	Madrid	Madrid–Barajas Airport		
South Korea	Busan	Gimhae International Airport	Terminated	
South Korea	Jeju	Jeju International Airport	Terminated	
South Korea	Seoul	Incheon International Airport		
Sudan	Khartoum	Khartoum International Airport	Terminated	
Switzerland	Zürich	Zürich Airport	Terminated	
Taiwan	Taipei	Taoyuan International Airport		
Thailand	Bangkok	Suvarnabhumi Airport		
Thailand	Chiang Mai	Chiang Mai International Airport		
Thailand	Pattaya	U-Tapao International Airport	Terminated	
Thailand	Phuket	Phuket International Airport		
Turkey	Istanbul	Atatürk Airport	Airport closed	
United Arab Emirates	Abu Dhabi	Zayed International Airport		
United Arab Emirates	Dubai	Dubai International Airport		
United Kingdom	Birmingham	Birmingham Airport	Terminated	
United Kingdom	Edinburgh	Edinburgh Airport		
United Kingdom	London	Heathrow Airport		
United Kingdom	Manchester	Manchester Airport		
United States	Boston	Logan International Airport		
United States	Chicago	O'Hare International Airport	Terminated	
United States	Las Vegas	Harry Reid International Airport	Terminated	
United States	Los Angeles	Los Angeles International Airport	Terminated	
United States	New York City	John F. Kennedy International Airport	Terminated	
United States	San Jose	San Jose International Airport	Terminated	
United States	Seattle	Seattle–Tacoma International Airport		
Vietnam	Da Nang	Da Nang International Airport	Terminated	
Vietnam	Hanoi	Noi Bai International Airport	Terminated	
Vietnam	Ho Chi Minh City	Tan Son Nhat International Airport		
Vietnam	Nha Trang	Cam Ranh International Airport	Terminated	
Vietnam	Phu Quoc	Phu Quoc International Airport	Terminated	
