= Beijing Capital Airlines =

Chinese low-cost airline

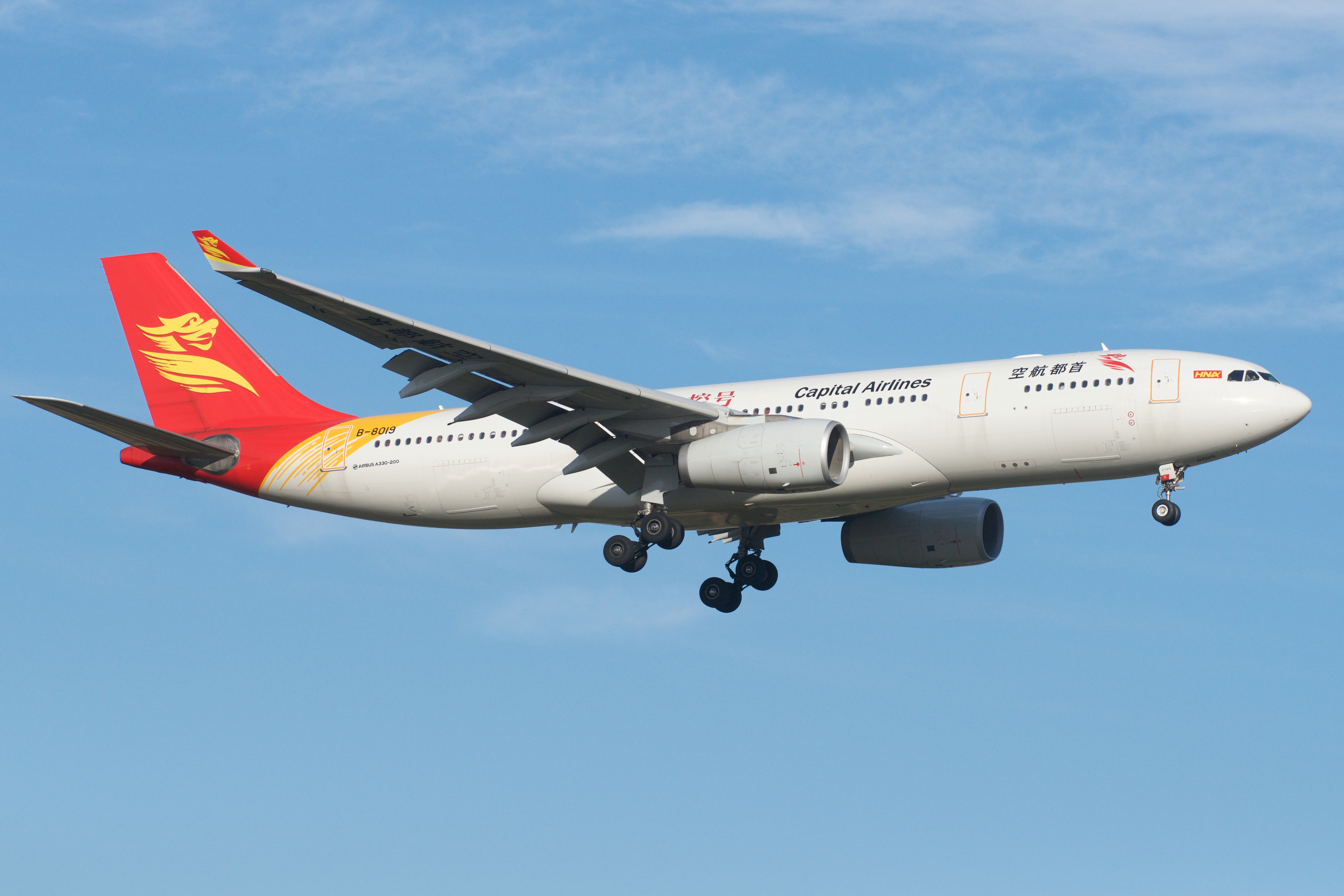
- Capital Airlines Airbus A330-200 in 2018
IATA	ICAO	Call sign
JD	CBJ	CAPITAL JET
- Founded: 1995; 31 years ago (as Deer Jet Airlines); 2 May 2010; 16 years ago (Beijing Capital Airlines Co., Ltd established)
- Hubs: Beijing-Daxing
- Secondary hubs: Hangzhou
- Focus cities: Qingdao
- Frequent-flyer program: Fortune Wings Club
- Fleet size: 82
- Destinations: 75
- Parent company: HNA Aviation (70%)
- Website: www.jdair.net

Beijing Capital Airlines (Chinese: 首都航空; pinyin: Shǒudū Hángkōng), commonly known as Capital Airlines, is a Chinese hybrid airline based at Beijing Daxing International Airport in Beijing, China. It is a subsidiary of Hainan Airlines. The airline offers budget airline service structures on domestic flights and employs a full service offering on regional and long haul international flights, which includes checked bags, complimentary meals, and elevated service.

== History ==
Deer Jet logo

The company was established in 1995 as Deer Jet Airlines (Chinese: 金鹿航空; pinyin: Jīnlù Hángkōng). In 1998, it began offering international services under the Deer Air branding. In October 2007, it received its first Airbus A319 and began returning the formerly operated Boeing 737s. Deer Jet began providing charter services in December 2008 using a fleet of A319s and corporate jets. The airline was authorized by the Civil Aviation Administration of China to operate scheduled air services in 2009.

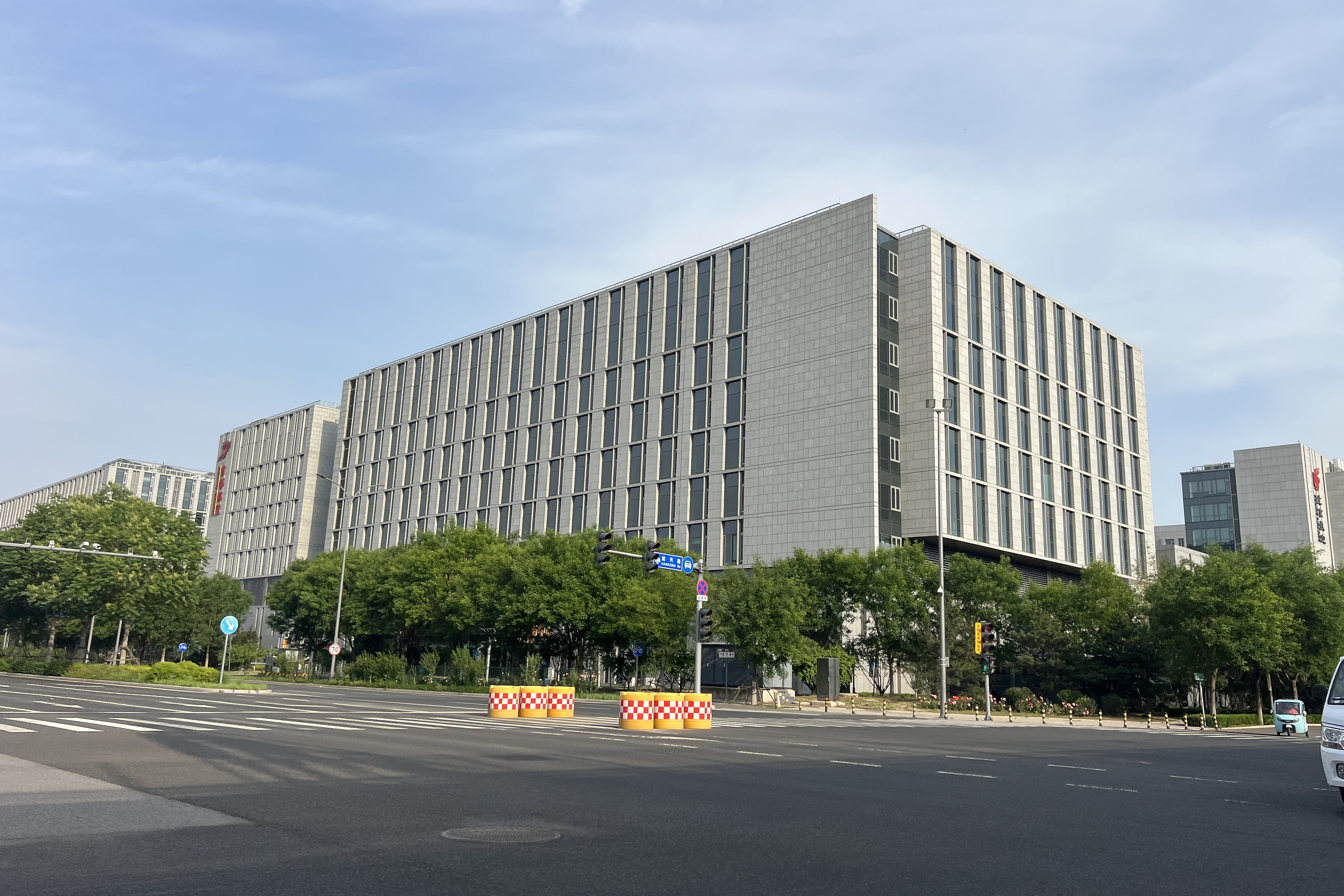
Daxing base of Capital Airlines

On 2 April 2010, Beijing Capital Airlines CO., LTD. launched its first service, based at Beijing Capital International Airport. On 2 May 2010, Beijing Capital Airlines Co., Ltd was officially established. Deer Jet Airlines was divided into two companies on 4 May 2010. While the charter operation has kept the Deer Jet branding, scheduled operations using Airbus aircraft were renamed Beijing Capital Airlines. Beijing Capital Airlines operates mainly in China including the Hong Kong and Macao special administrative regions and Taiwan, focusing on international air passenger service and cargo transport operations.

== Destinations ==
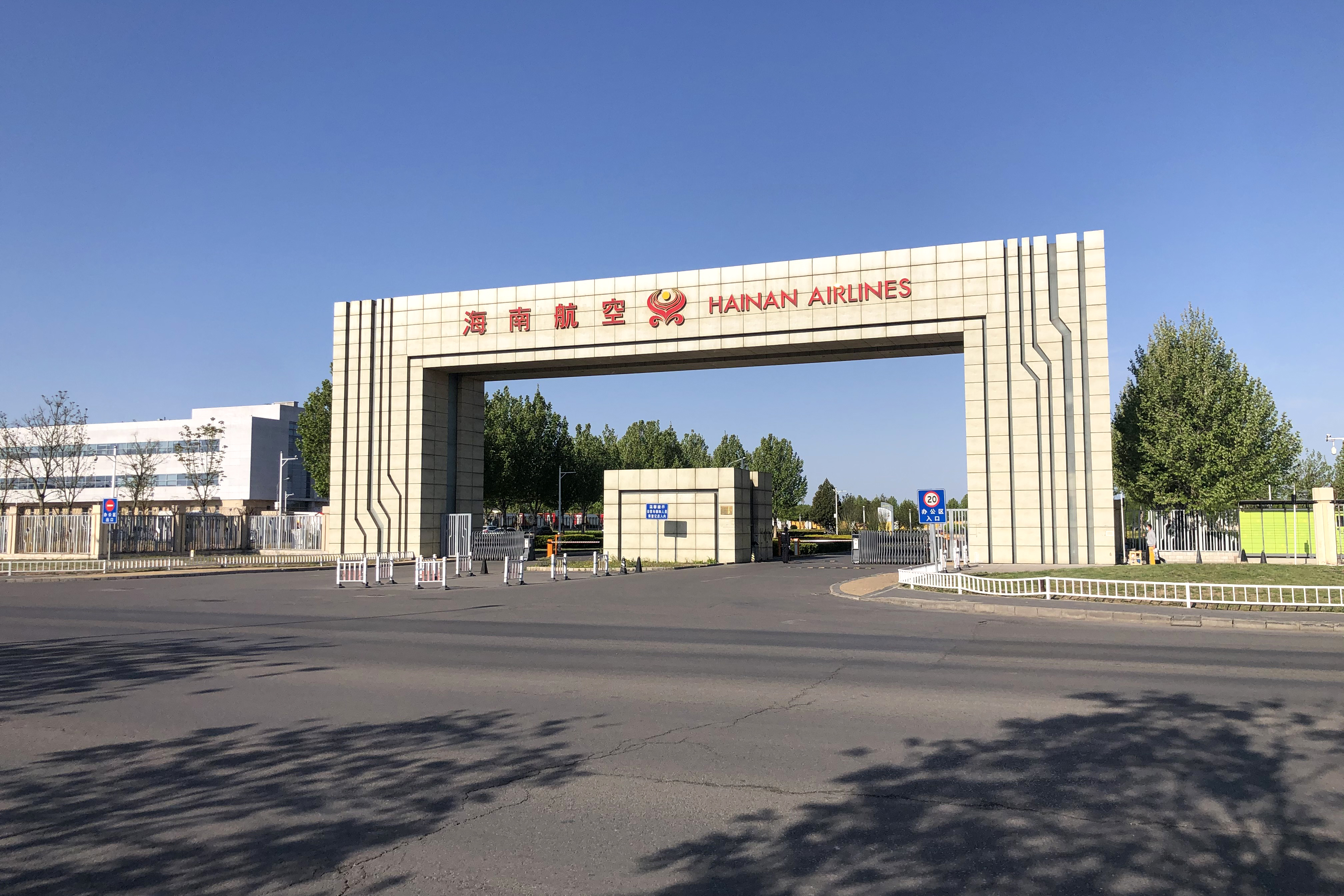
Hainan Airlines facility in Beijing, which has the Capital Airlines headquarters

On 29 October 2014, Beijing Capital Airlines launched the first international scheduled flight from Hangzhou to Naha.

Since 2015, long-haul flights between China and other cities have been operated by Beijing Capital Airlines, with their first A330 delivered on 11 July 2015. In July 2016, Beijing Capital Airline announced its first launch, an Australian flight from Qingdao to Melbourne on 30 September, served by an Airbus A330 jet. In November 2016, Beijing Capital Airlines announced the launch of a Hangzhou-Qingdao-Vancouver service on 30 December 2016, which is served by an Airbus A330 aircraft.

Beijing Capital Airlines launched twice a week Beijing-Xian-Lisbon service starting from 30 August 2019. In September 2019, Beijing Capital Airlines announced that it would be moving some flights from Beijing Capital Airport to the newly opened Beijing Daxing Airport from 27 October 2019.

As of 6 July 2025, Beijing Capital Airlines serves the Moscow - Sherematyevo (Russia) route.

=== Codeshare agreements ===
Beijing Capital Airlines have codeshare agreements with the following airlines:

- Hainan Airlines
- TAP Air Portugal

=== Interline agreements ===
- APG Airlines
- Hahn Air

== Fleet ==
=== Current fleet ===
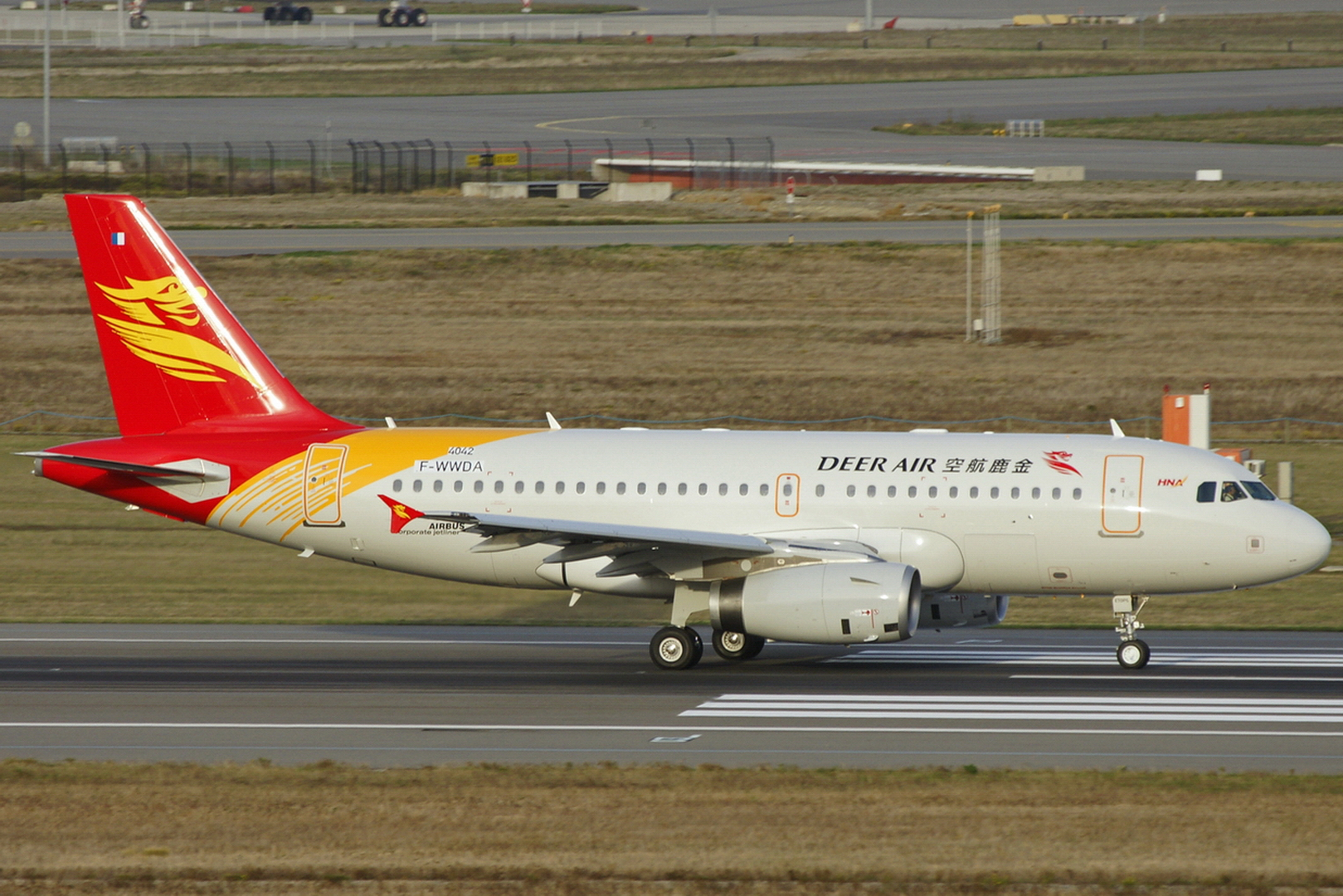
Capital Airlines (as Deer Air) Airbus A319CJ at Toulouse–Blagnac Airport in 2012

As of August 2025, Beijing Capital Airlines operates the following aircraft:

Beijing Capital Airlines fleet
Aircraft	In service	Orders	Passengers			Notes
Aircraft	In service	Orders	J	Y	Total	Notes
Airbus A319-100	10	—	—	138	138	
Airbus A320-200	34	—	—	174	174	
Airbus A320neo	7	—	—	180	180	
Airbus A321-200	15	—	—	212	212	
Airbus A321neo	3	—	—	234	234	
Airbus A330-200	6	—	36	186	222	
Airbus A330-300	5	—	18	288	306	
Cargo fleet
Airbus A330-200P2F	1	—	Cargo			
Airbus A330-300P2F	1	—	Cargo			
Total	82	—				

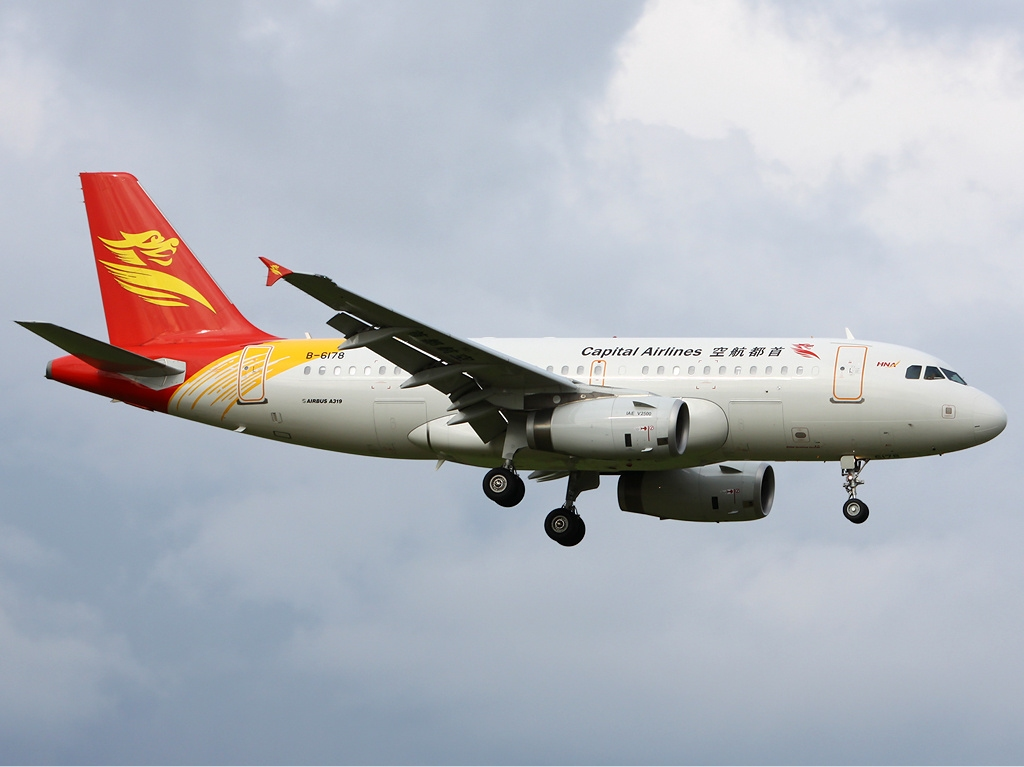
Capital Airlines Airbus A319-100 in 2010

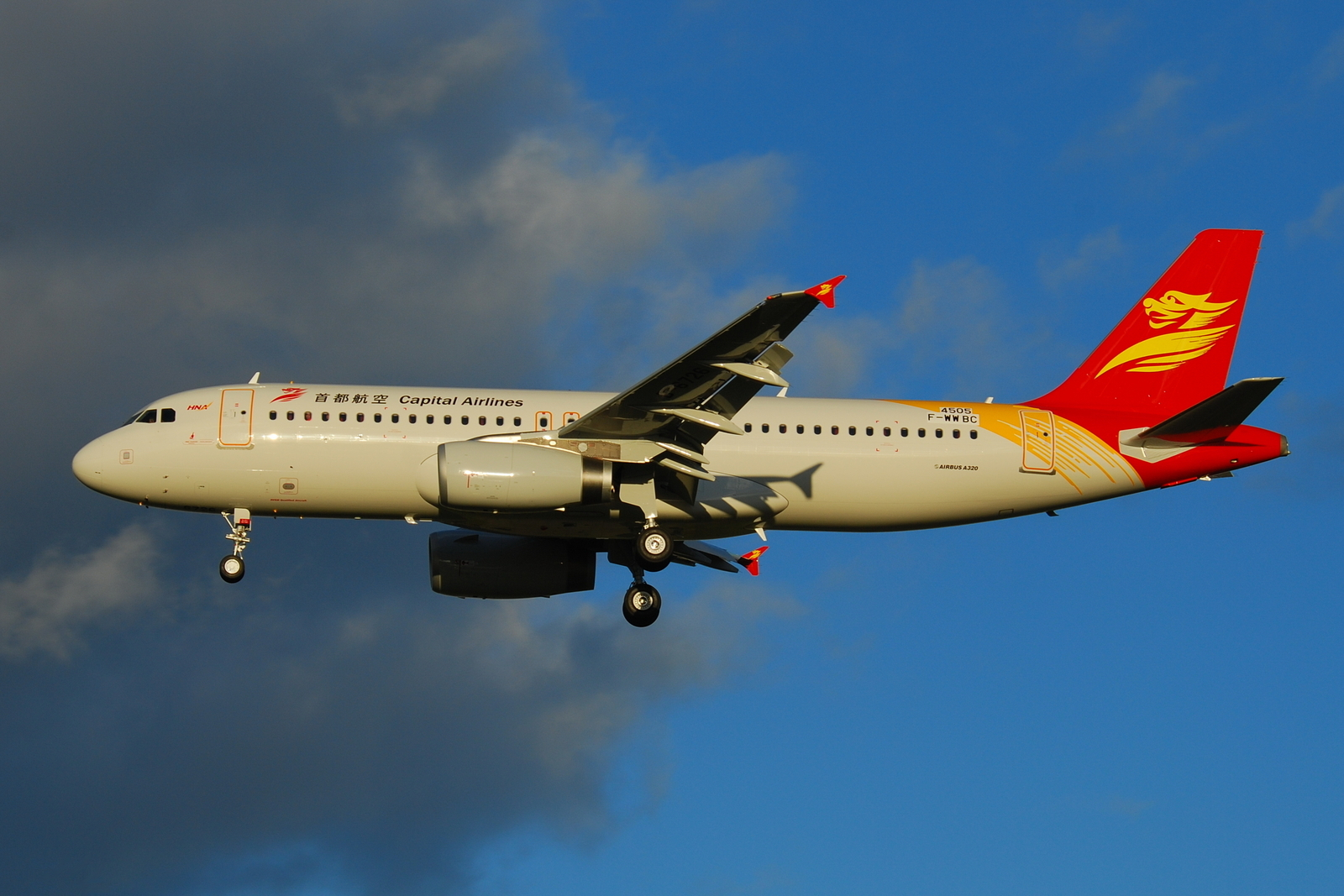
Beijing Capital Airlines Airbus A320-200 in 2011

Capital Airlines Airbus A320neo in 2024

Capital Airlines Airbus A321-200 in 2024

Capital Airlines Airbus A321neo in 2024

Capital Airlines Airbus A330-200 in 2018

Capital Airlines Airbus A330-300 in 2025

Capital Airlines Airbus A330-200P2F in 2025
