= Hainan Airlines =

Chinese airline

Hainan Airlines 海南航空

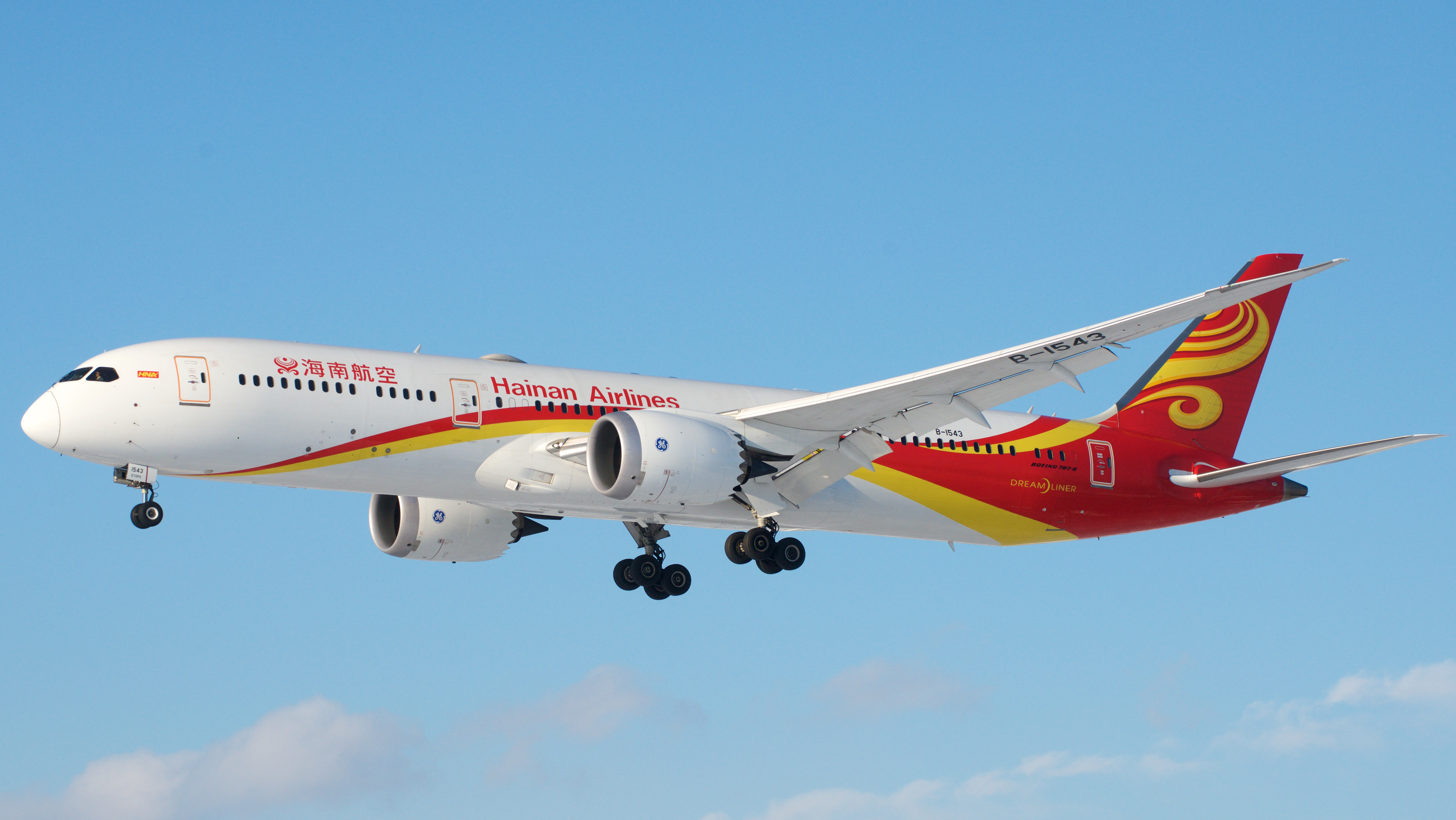
- Hainan Airlines Boeing 787-9
IATA	ICAO	Call sign
HU	CHH	HAINAN
- Founded: October 1989; 37 years ago
- Hubs: Beijing–Capital; Chongqing; Haikou; Shenzhen; Xi'an
- Focus cities: Changsha; Guangzhou; Lanzhou; Sanya; Shanghai-Pudong; Taiyuan; Ürümqi
- Frequent-flyer program: Fortune Wings Club
- Subsidiaries: Air Changan (83.03%); Beijing Capital Airlines (70%); Fuzhou Airlines (60%); Grand China Air; Hong Kong Airlines; Lucky Air (86.68%); Tianjin Airlines; Urumqi Air (70%)
- Fleet size: 233
- Destinations: 120
- Parent company: Fangda Group; HNA Aviation Group
- Traded as: SSE: 600221 (A share); SSE: 900945 (B share)
- Headquarters: Haikou, Hainan, China
- Key people: Zhu Tao (chairman)
- Website: www.hainanairlines.com

Hainan Airlines is an airline headquartered in Haikou, Hainan, China. It is the largest civilian-run Chinese air transport company, making it the fourth-largest airline in terms of fleet size in the People's Republic of China, and the tenth-largest airline in Asia in terms of passengers carried. It operates scheduled domestic and international services on 500 routes from Hainan and various locations on the mainland, as well as charter services. Its main base is located at Haikou Meilan International Airport, with hubs at Beijing-Capital, Chongqing, Shenzhen and Xi'an, along with several focus cities.

== History ==
=== Early years ===
Hainan Airlines was established in October 1989 as Hainan Province Airlines in Hainan, the largest special economic zone in China. Hainan Province Airlines became China's first joint-stock air-transport company following a restructuring in January 1993 and began scheduled services on 2 May 1993. The initial 250 million yuan (US$31.25 million) was financed by the Hainan government (5.33%) and the corporate staff (20%). The rest came from institutional shareholders. In 1996, the provincial airline was renamed Hainan Airlines.

American Aviation LLC, controlled by George Soros, had been a major shareholder of the airline since 1995.

Executive-jet operations with a Bombardier Learjet 55 were added in April 1995. In 1998, Hainan Airlines became the first Chinese carrier to own shares of an airport after it had purchased 25% stake of Haikou Meilan International Airport.

=== Development since the 2000s ===
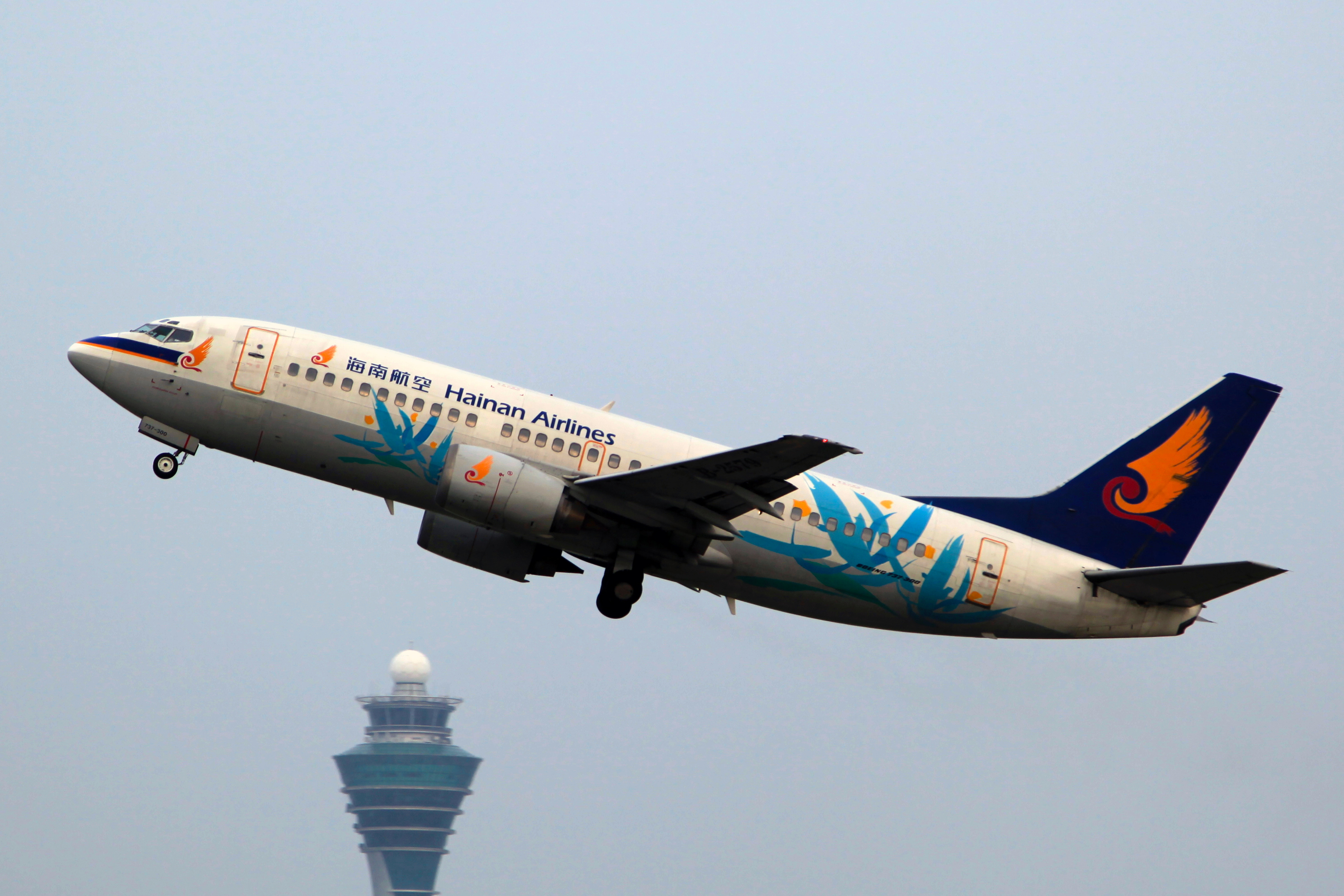
A now retired Hainan Airlines Boeing 737-300 wearing the airline's former livery

In 2000, HNA Group was established and became the third largest shareholder (7.31%) of Hainan Airlines. It also controlled Shanxi Airlines, Chang An Airlines and China Xinhua Airlines. By 2003, Hainan, the main airline, overtook Chang'an as the fourth largest airline in China.

In 2007, Grand China Air was established as the new holding company, when American Aviation became its subsidiary.

On 29 September 2005, HNA Group ordered 42 Boeing 787-8s, 10 of which were earmarked for the Hainan Airlines fleet. In January 2006, China Aviation Supplies Import and Export Group Corporation ordered 10 Boeing 737-800s for Hainan Airlines. In September 2006, Hainan Airlines ordered another 15 Boeing 737-800s.

On 4 December 2007, Hainan Airlines acquired three Airbus A340-600s on lease from International Lease Finance Corporation. On 14 November 2007, Hainan Airlines received its first Airbus A330-200. In June 2007, Hainan Airlines ordered 13 Airbus A320-200 aircraft. In late 2007, Hainan Airlines ordered 50 Embraer ERJ-145s and 50 Embraer 190s, with a total value (at list price) of US$2.7 billion. The 50-seat ERJ-145s were produced by the Harbin Embraer Aircraft Industry (HEAI) joint venture, located in Harbin. E-190 deliveries began in December 2007. Due to the 2008 financial crisis and resulting losses, the ERJ-145 order was reduced to 25. The E-190 order remained unchanged.

On 25 March 2015, Hainan Airlines announced its intention to acquire 30 Boeing 787-9s, which are all to join the Hainan Airlines Fleet. The delivery of the aircraft is scheduled for completion by 2021. Two leased Boeing 787-9 aircraft were delivered in the spring of 2016. Hainan Airlines will also be among the first operators of the Comac C919, with deliveries beginning in the 2020s.

=== Restructuring of parent company ===
Hainan Airlines's parent company HNA Group announced on 19 January 2021 that it had entered bankruptcy restructuring after a government-led exercise to work out its debt failed to produce enough money to repay bondholders and creditors. As of 24 September 2021, HNA Group was broken into four components, one of which is the airline component, due to the bankruptcy court order. Liaoning Fangda Group Industrial, a conglomerate with business in the carbon, steel, and pharmaceuticals industries, will invest in the airline component.

On 20 January 2022, HNA Aviation Group Co., Ltd. completed the industrial and commercial change procedures. 95% of the company's equity was registered under the name of Hainan Fangda Aviation Development Co., Ltd., and the remaining 5% was held by Hainan Hainan Airlines No. 2 Information Management Service Co., Ltd. Hainan Airlines becomes a subsidiary of HNA Aviation, part of Liaoning Fangda Group.

Hainan Airlines' livery history

1989 to 1993

1993 to 2004

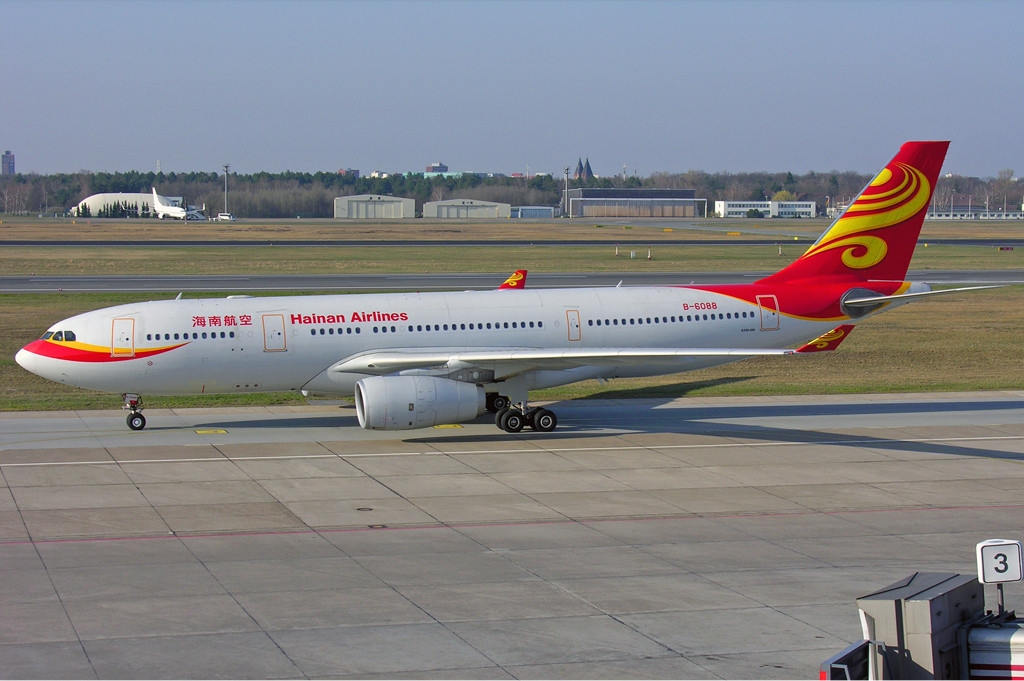
2004 to 2013

2013 to present

== Corporate affairs ==
=== Offices ===
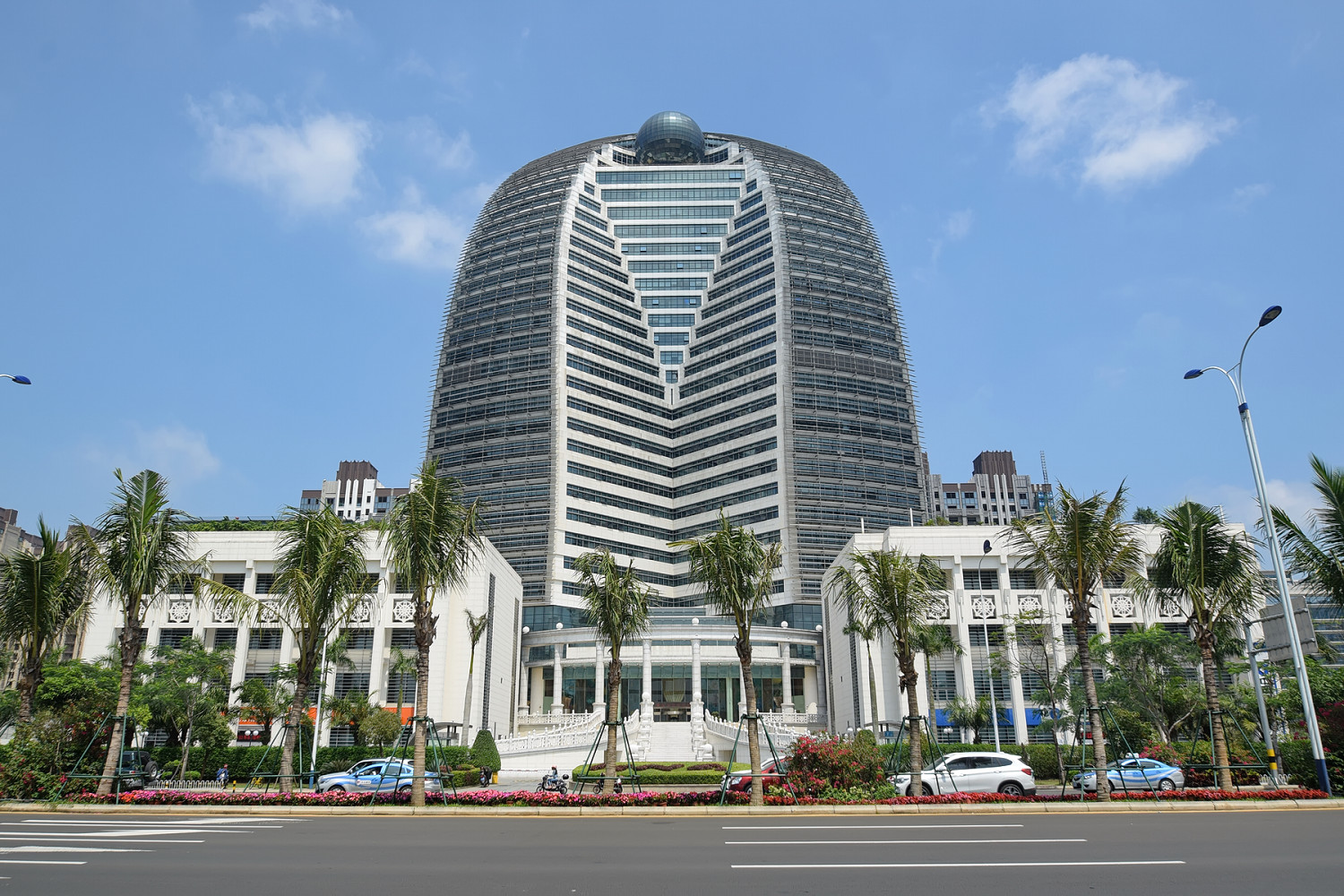
HNA Building, headquarters in Haikou

Hainan Airlines and the HNA Group have their headquarters in the HNA Building (simplified Chinese: 新海航大厦; traditional Chinese: 新海航大廈; pinyin: Xīn Hǎiháng Dàshà), in Haikou, Hainan. With other office premises, HNA Tower, in focused cities including Beijing, Chongqing, Guangzhou, and Shanghai. It was previously headquartered in the HNA Development Building also known as the Haihang Development Building (海航发展大厦; 海航發展大廈; Hǎiháng Fāzhǎn Dàshà) along Haixiu Road in Haikou.

=== Shareholders ===
As of 31 December 2016, the Hainan provincial government owns 53.67% of Hainan Airlines' shares through Grand China Air Holding Company, which is controlled by the investment arm of the Hainan government. Grand China Air is the direct parent company of Hainan Airlines (24.33% shares directly; an additional 1.29% shares via a subsidiary American Aviation LDC), which was partially owned by Hainan Development Holdings (24.97%), HNA Group (23.11%), Starstep (9.57%), Haikou Meilan International Airport (8.30%), Shenhua Group (5.56%) and other shareholders (As of 30 June 2016). HNA Group owned 3.53% shares directly and via Changjiang Leasing, owned an additional 3.08% shares as the second largest shareholder. Haikou Meilan International Airport was the third largest shareholder for 5.13% shares. Moreover, HNA Group also owned Haikou Meilan International Airport partially, as well as Hainan Airlines as cross ownership. A private equity fund that was managed by Shanghai Pudong Development Bank, owned 4.91% shares as the fourth largest shareholder.

== Destinations ==
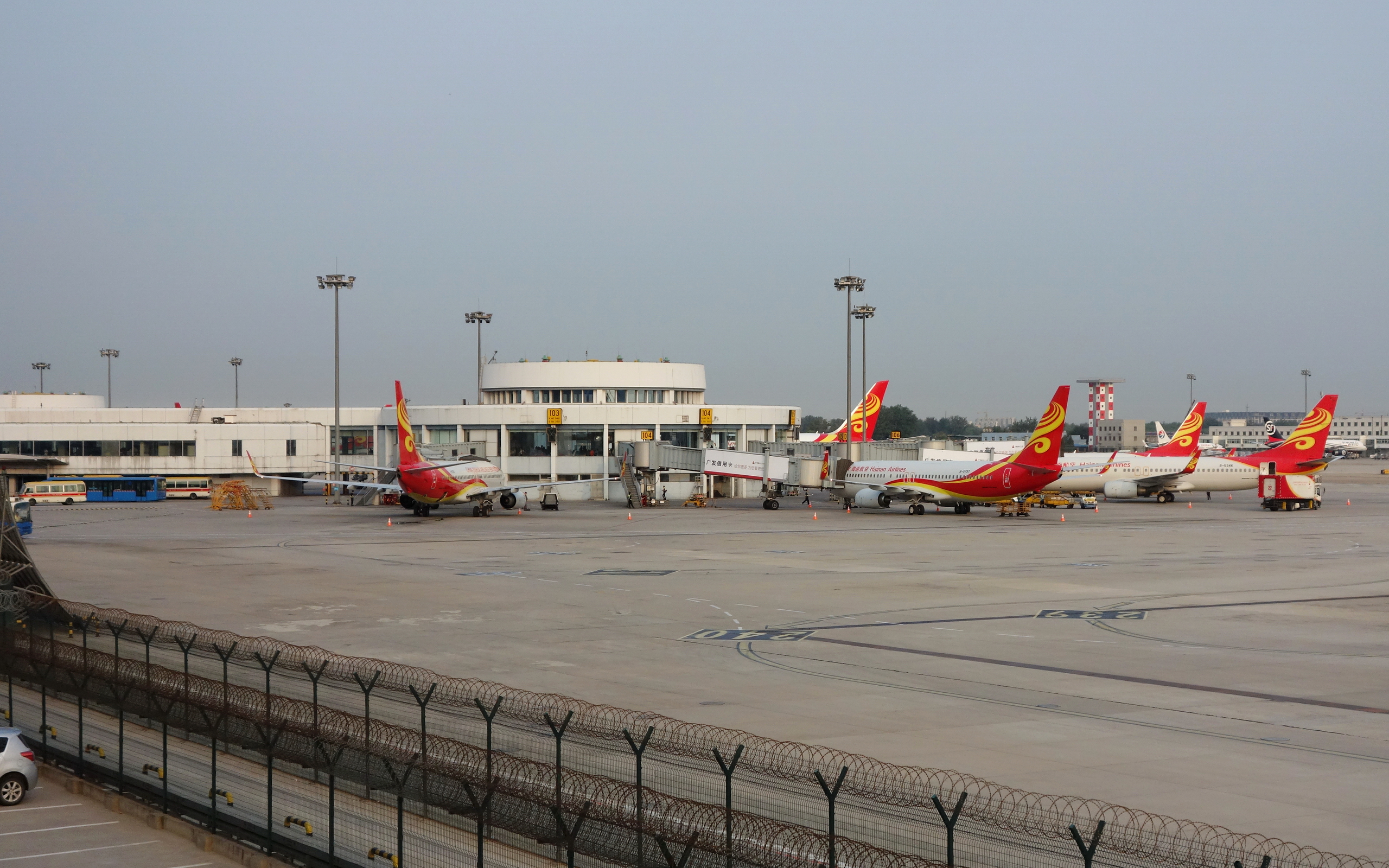
Hainan Airlines line-up at their Beijing–Capital hub in 2013

As of January 2026, Hainan Airlines operates seven bases across China: Beijing–Capital, Guangzhou, Haikou, Hangzhou, Sanya, Shenzhen, and Xi'an. It operates an extensive network across the People's Republic of China, connecting Asia, Europe, North America and Oceania and serves nearly 500 domestic and international routes, flying to more than 90 cities.

Hainan operates regular international flights and offers charter flights to 51 destinations in 28 countries such as flights from Beijing to Almaty, Toronto, Berlin, Brussels, Seattle/Tacoma, St. Petersburg, Moscow, Tel Aviv, and Boston; Beijing, Xi'an, Dalian, Guangzhou, Haikou to Taipei; Beijing, Haikou, Nanning to Bangkok; Hefei via Haikou to Singapore and others. As of June 2014, Hainan began servicing Boston directly with a four-times-weekly Dreamliner flight from Beijing Capital International Airport. It was the first direct flight between Boston and China. The airline began service in the second quarter of 2013 with the Boeing 787 Dreamliner aircraft and was the first Chinese carrier to offer flights between the two cities. Flights from Beijing-Capital to Chicago-O'Hare began on 3 September 2013, but have since been severed due to the COVID-19 pandemic.

On 23 October 2015, Hainan announced flights to Manchester, United Kingdom, starting in summer 2016. Hainan announced the launch of a direct route between Beijing and Calgary, Canada, as of 30 June 2016. During the second half of 2017, Hainan Airlines began flights from Shanghai to Tel Aviv and restarted flights from Shanghai to Brussels. In late September 2017, Hainan Airlines commenced direct flights to and from Brisbane, Australia, several times a week, and also to Belgrade, Serbia, via Prague, every Monday and Friday. On 8 March 2018, Hainan Airlines announced flights between Changsha and London Heathrow, commencing 23 March 2018. On 15 March 2018, they announced round trip flights between Beijing–Capital, Dublin, and Edinburgh commencing 12 June 2018. In mid October 2018, flights from Shenzhen to Vienna were launched. A non-stop route to Belgrade, Serbia was launched on 16 July 2022.

=== Codeshare agreements ===
Hainan Airlines has codeshare agreements with the following airlines:

- Aegean Airlines
- Air Europa
- Air Serbia
- Alaska Airlines
- Beijing Capital Airlines (subsidiary)
- Brussels Airlines
- Etihad Airways
- EVA Air
- Grand China Air (subsidiary)
- GX Airlines (subsidiary)
- Hong Kong Airlines (subsidiary)
- Iberia
- ITA Airways
- Korean Air
- Loong Air
- Lucky Air (subsidiary)
- Suparna Airlines (subsidiary)
- S7 Airlines
- Tianjin Airlines (subsidiary)
- Uni Air
- Virgin Australia
- Volaris
- WestJet

== Fleet ==
=== Current fleet ===
As of July 2026, Hainan Airlines operates the following aircraft:

Hainan Airlines fleet
Aircraft	In service	Orders	Passengers				Notes
Aircraft	In service	Orders	J	W	Y	Total	Notes
Airbus A320neo	10	40	8	—	164	172	Delivery between 2028 and 2032
Airbus A321neo	2	—	8	—	196	204	
Airbus A330-200	6	—	36	—	178	214	
Airbus A330-200	6	—	18	—	242	260	
Airbus A330-300	22	—	32	—	260	292	
Airbus A330-300	22	—	24	—	279	303	
Airbus A330-900	1	19	24	—	277	301	
Boeing 737-800	126	—	8	—	156	164	
Boeing 737-800	126	—	8	—	162	170	
Boeing 737-800	126	—	—	—	186	186	
Boeing 737-800	126	—	—	—	189	189	
Boeing 737 MAX 8	32	28	8	—	168	176	The airline with the second largest of Boeing 737 MAX 8 fleet currently operating in China; 25 are leased from China Minsheng Bank. Have also acquisition agreements with other leasing companies, such as China Development Bank Leasing for 6 aircraft and flydubai for 4 aircraft.
Boeing 737 MAX 8	32	28	—	—	189	189	The airline with the second largest of Boeing 737 MAX 8 fleet currently operating in China; 25 are leased from China Minsheng Bank. Have also acquisition agreements with other leasing companies, such as China Development Bank Leasing for 6 aircraft and flydubai for 4 aircraft.
Boeing 787-8	10	—	36	—	177	213	To be retired
Boeing 787-9	28	—	30	—	259	289	
Boeing 787-9	28	—	30	—	262	292	
Boeing 787-9	28	—	26	21	247	294	
Comac C909	—	40	TBA				
Comac C919	—	60	TBA				
Total	233	147					

Hainan Airlines Airbus A320neo in 2025

Hainan Airlines Airbus A321neo in 2026

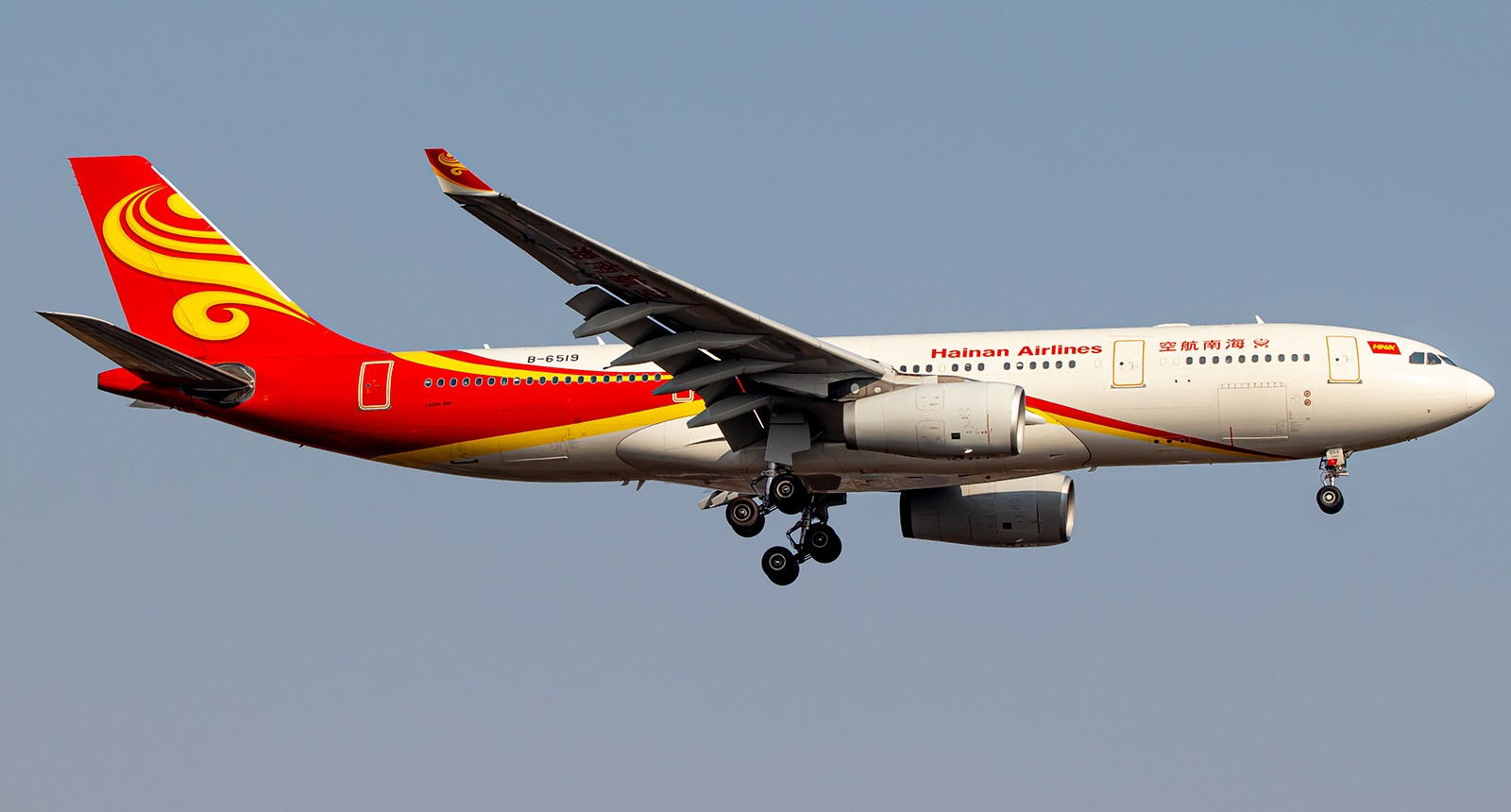
Hainan Airlines Airbus A330-200 in 2026

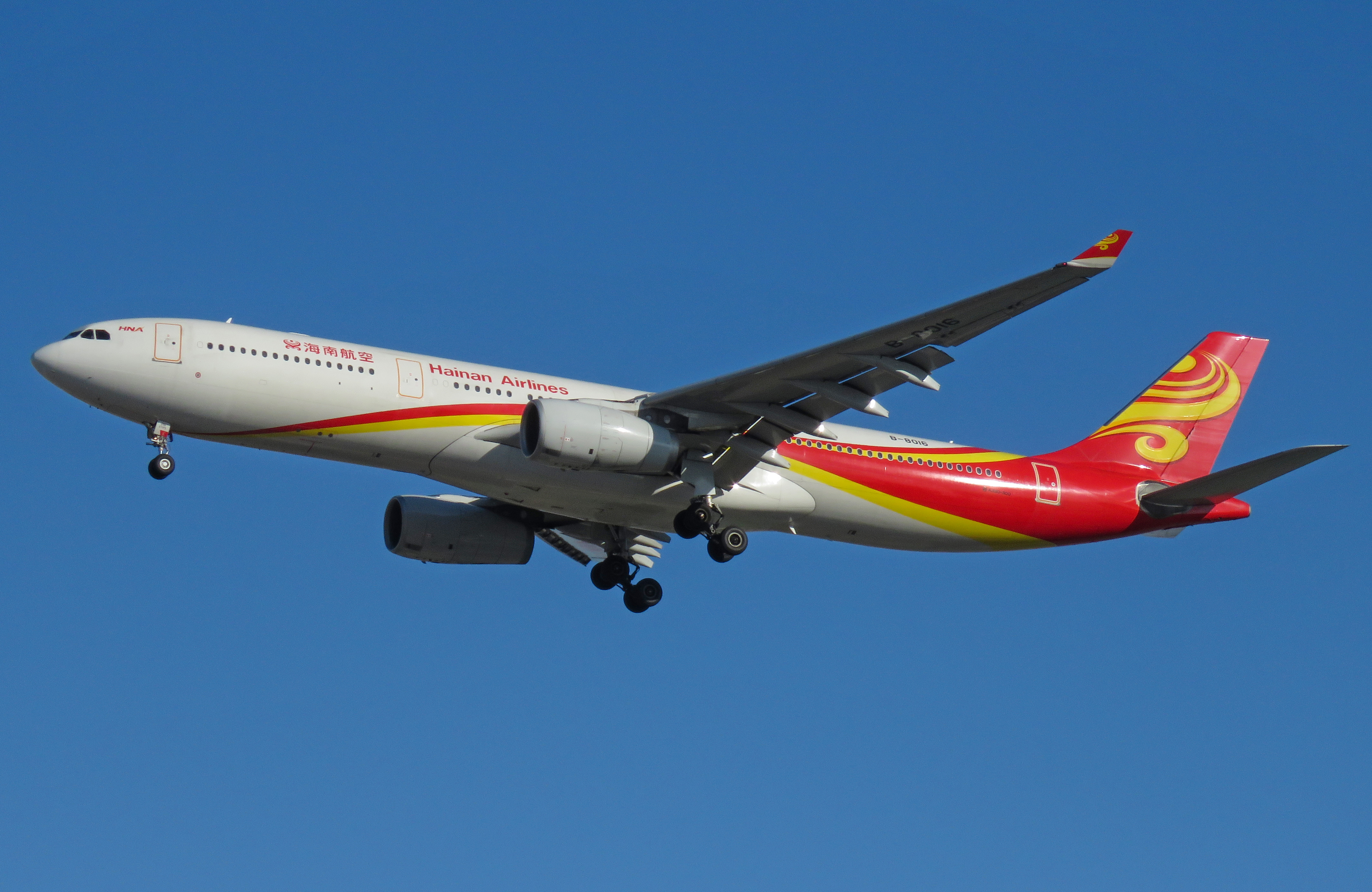
Hainan Airlines Airbus A330-300 in 2018

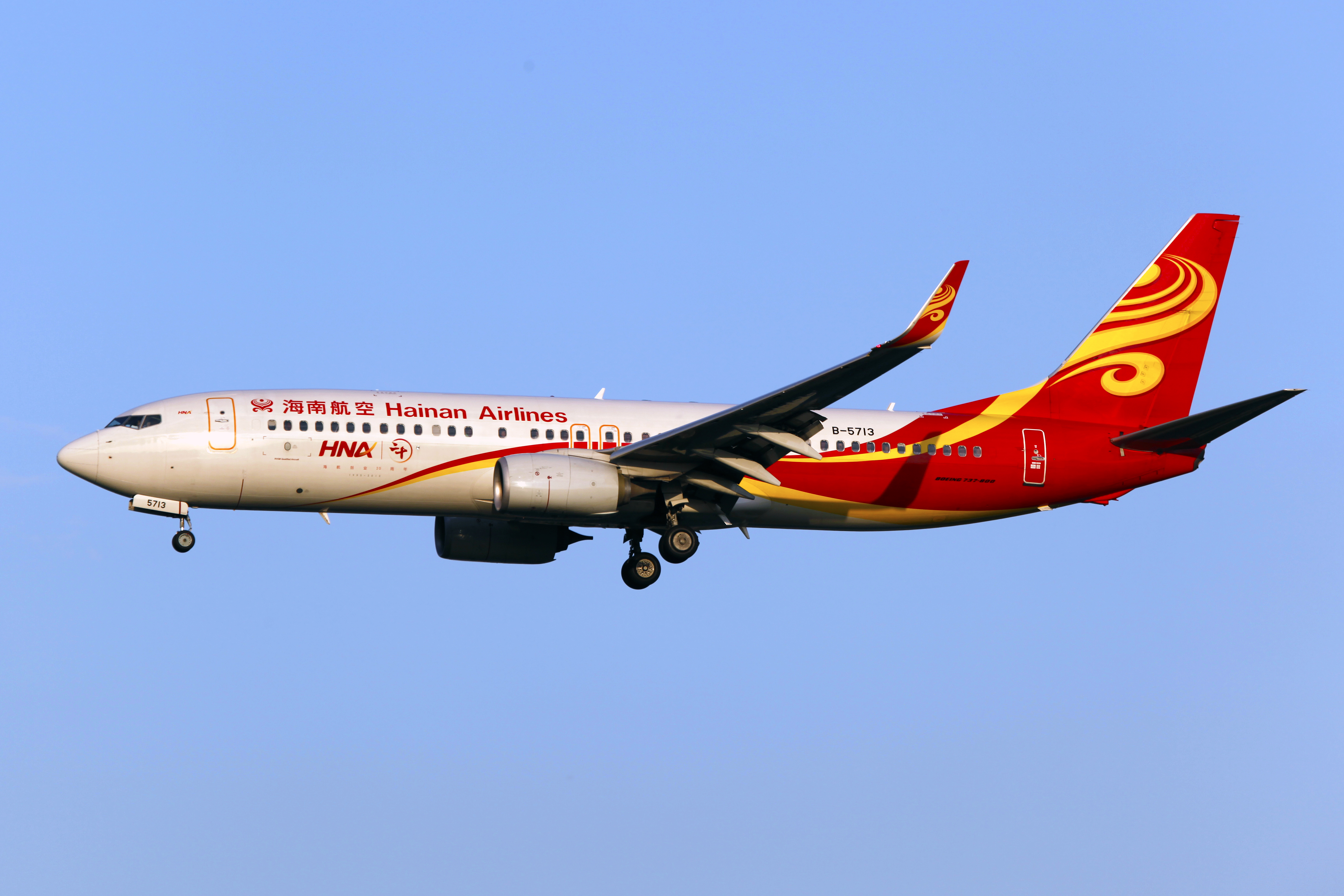
Hainan Airlines Boeing 737-800 in 2014

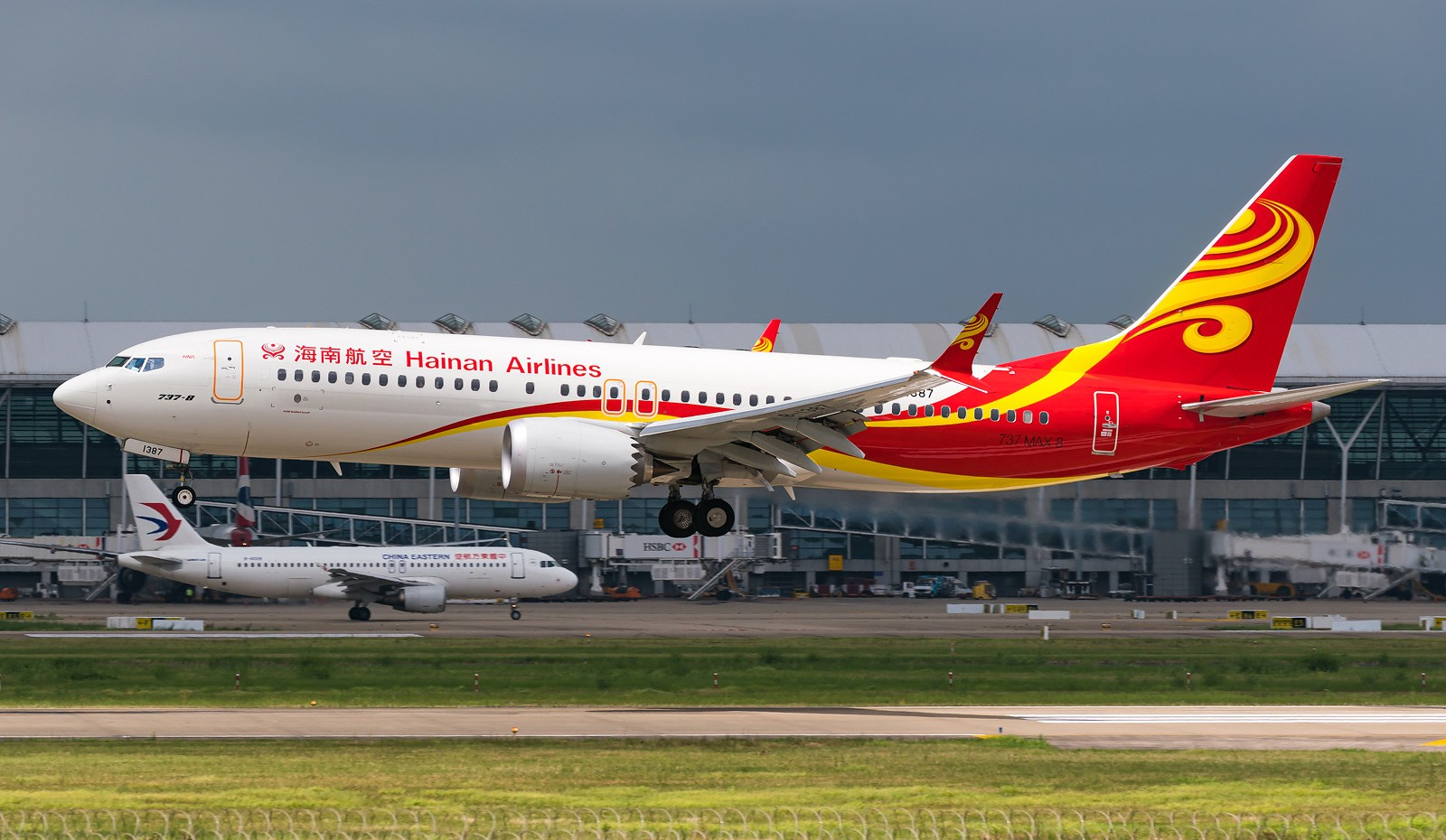
Hainan Airlines Boeing 737 MAX 8 in 2026

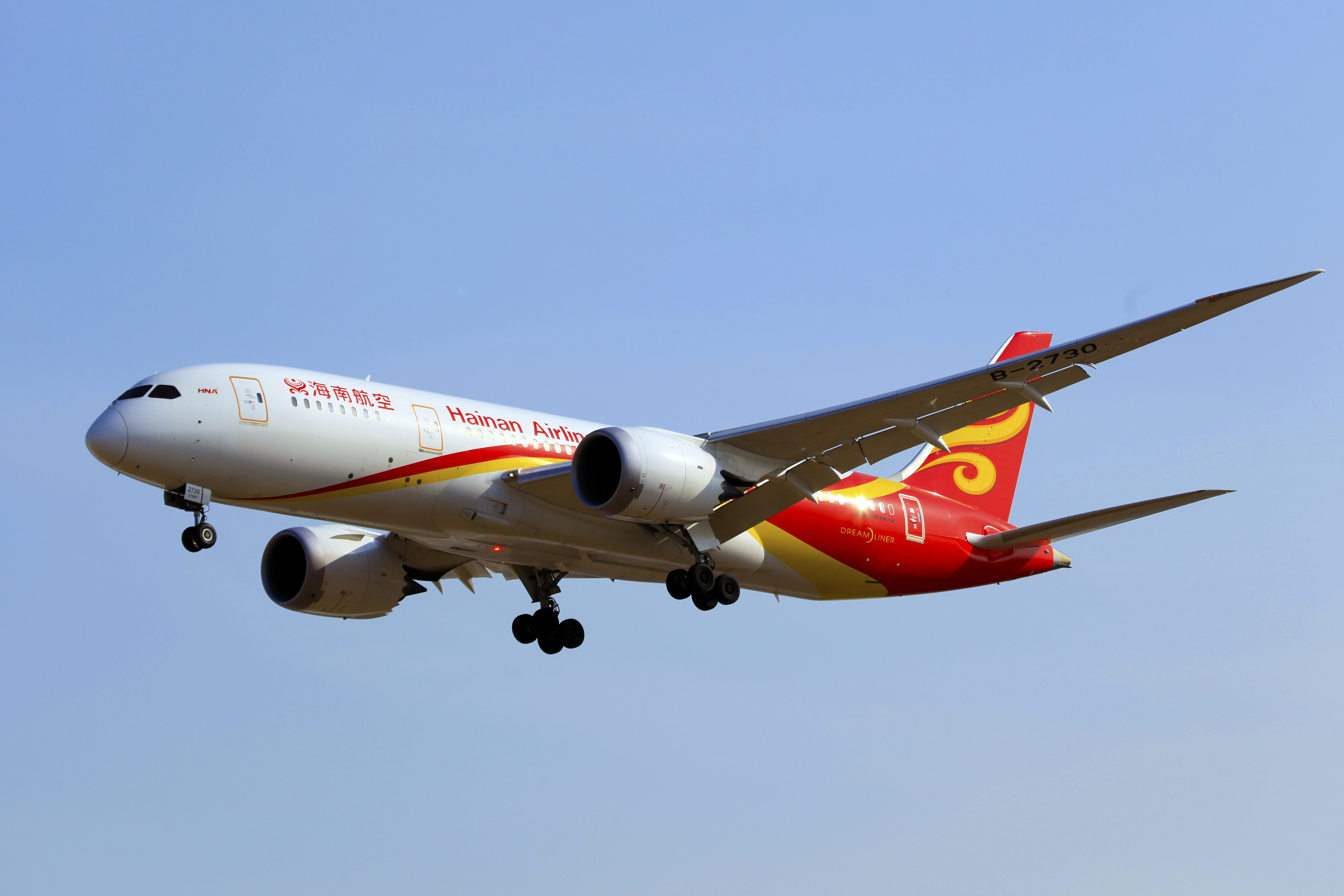
Hainan Airlines Boeing 787-8 in 2014

Hainan Airlines Boeing 787-9 in 2022

In July 2026, Hainan Airlines announced it had placed an order 40 Airbus A320neo-family aircraft in a Shanghai stock exchange filing, the aircraft will be delivered between 2028 and 2032.

=== Former fleet ===
Hainan Airlines has previously operated the following aircraft:

Hainan Airlines former fleet
Aircraft	Total	Introduced	Retired	Notes
Airbus A319-100	6	2005	2008	Transferred to Deer Air.
Airbus A340-600	3	2008	2014	Acquired from Cathay Pacific.
Airbus A350-900	2	2019	2020	
Boeing 737-300	8	1993	2014	
Boeing 737-300SF	1	2004	2005	Transferred to Yangtze River Express.
Boeing 737-400	7	1995	2014	
Boeing 737-700	6	2011	2019	
Boeing 767-300ER	5	2002	2018	
Fairchild Dornier 328JET	27	1999	2009	
Fairchild Swearingen Metroliner	9	1994	2000	

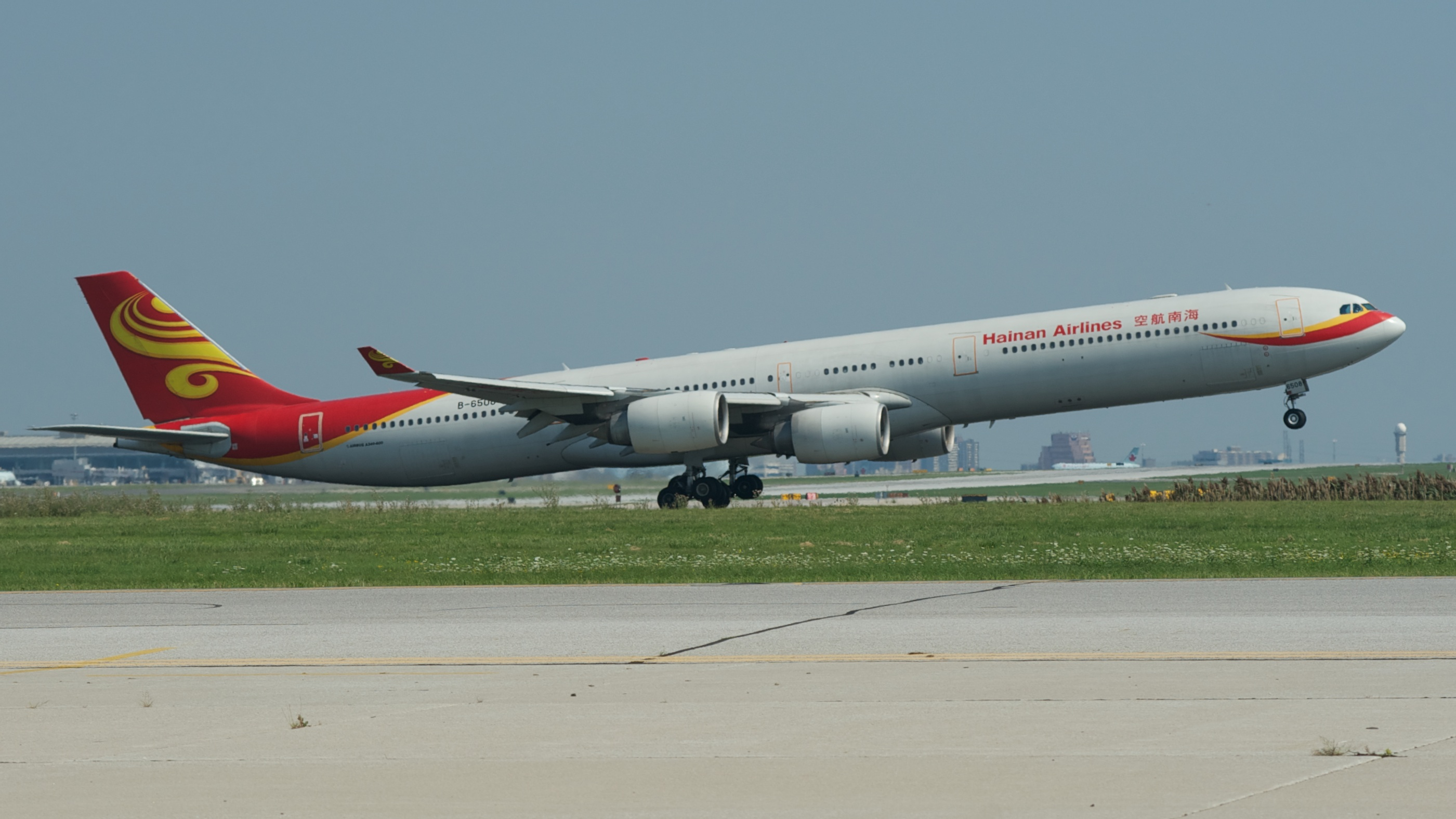
Hainan Airlines Airbus A340-600 in 2012

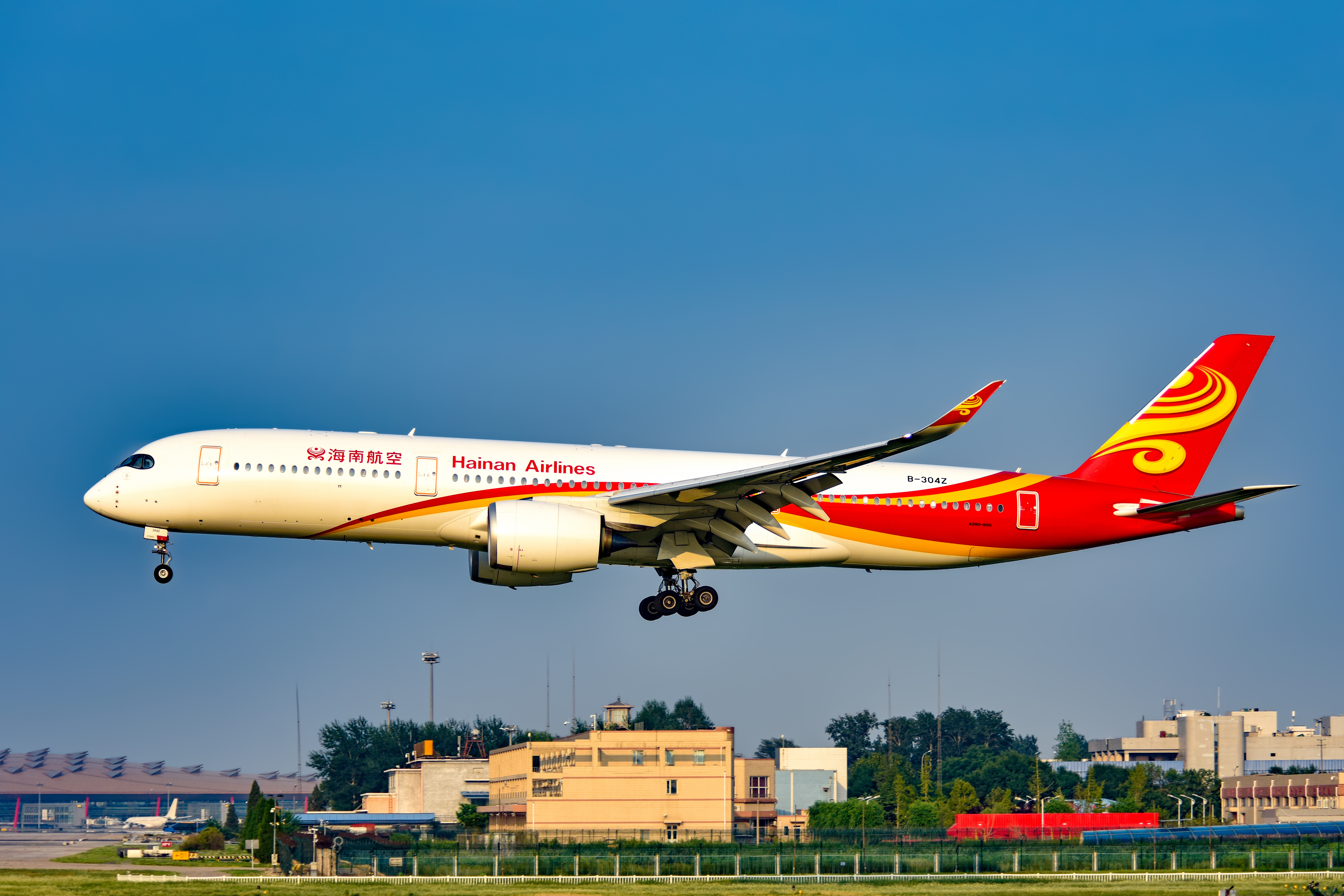
Hainan Airlines Airbus A350-900 in 2019

Hainan Airlines Boeing 737-300 in 2013

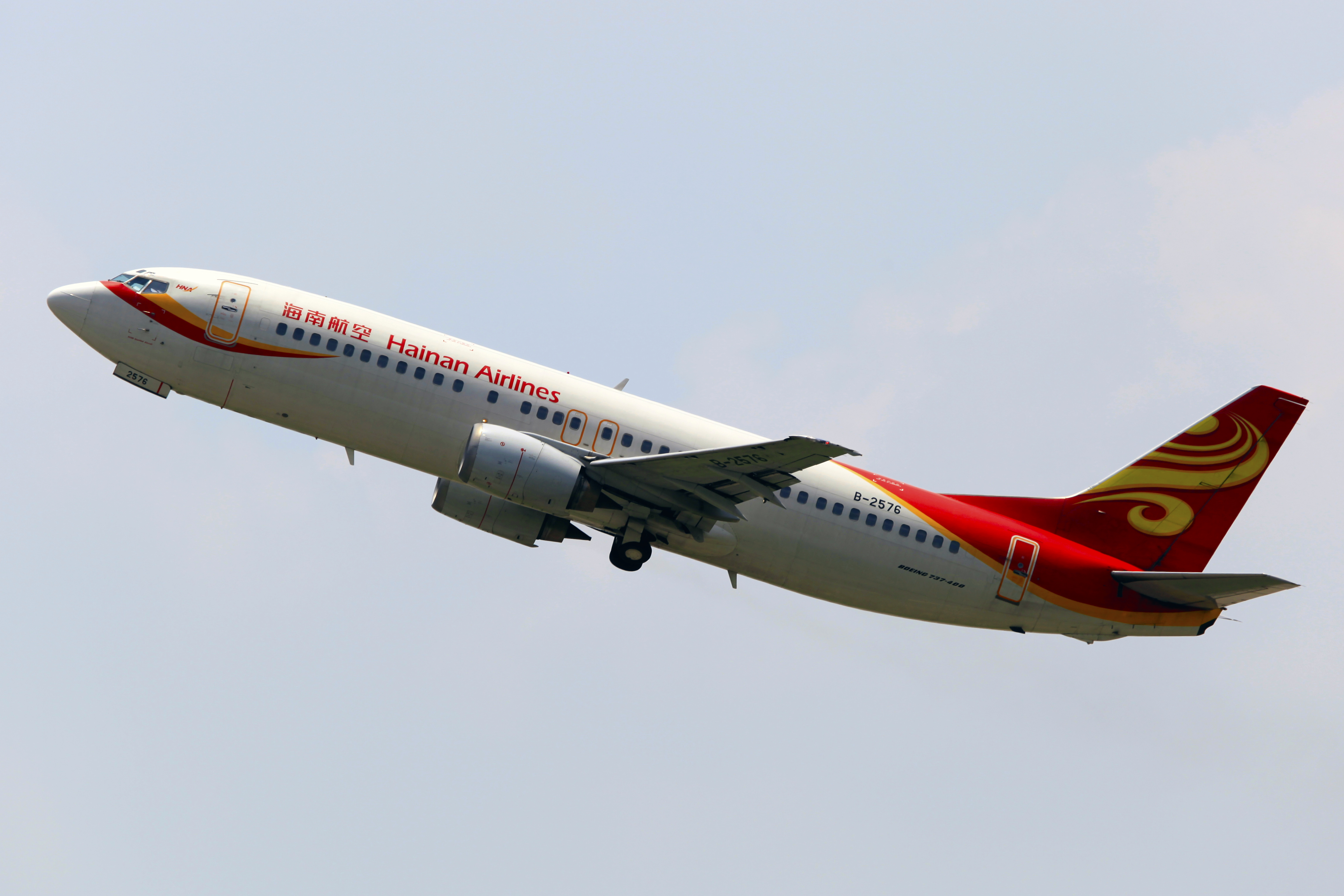
Hainan Airlines Boeing 737-400 in 2013

Hainan Airlines Boeing 737-700 in 2014

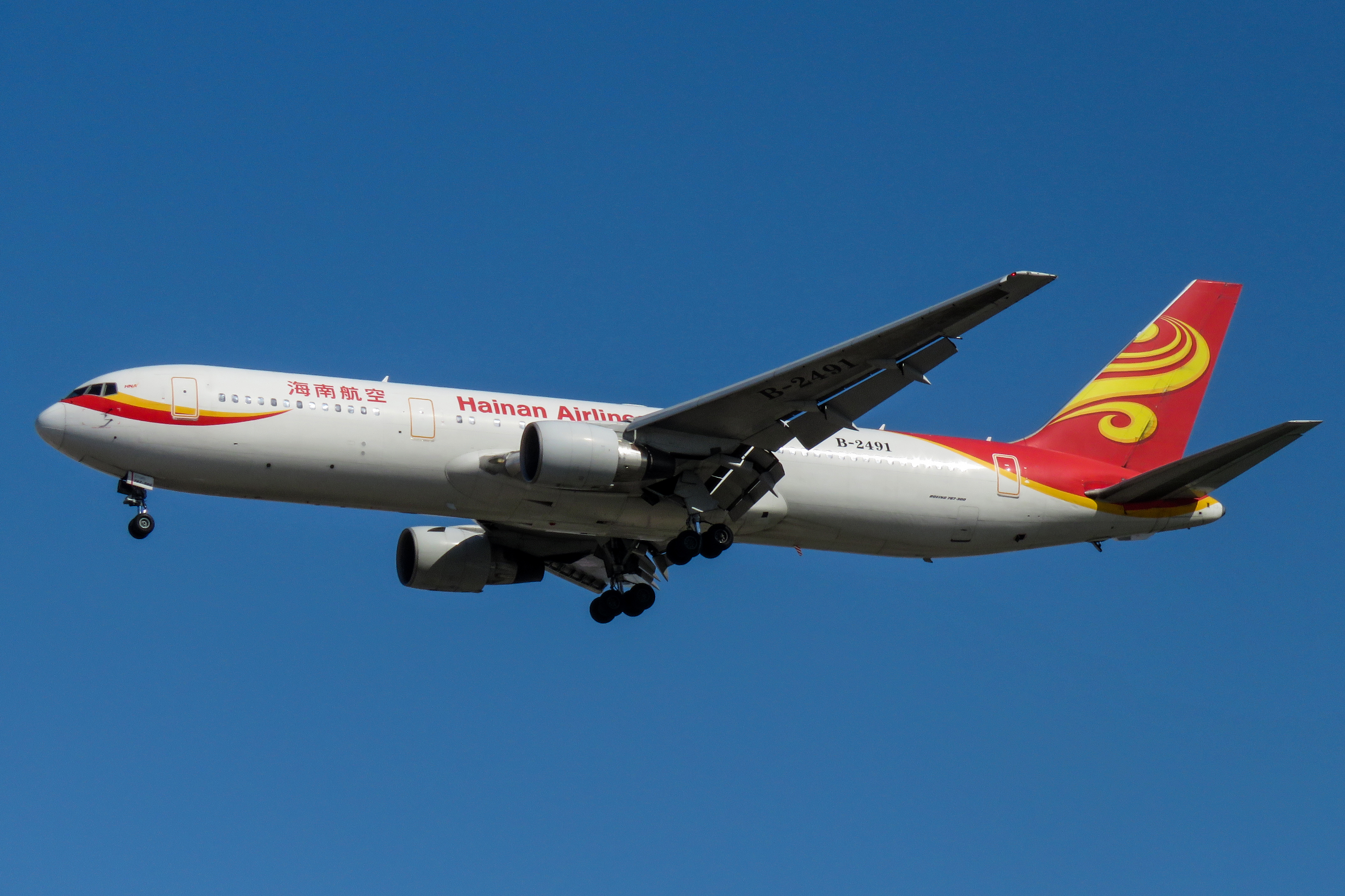
Hainan Airlines Boeing 767-300 in 2018

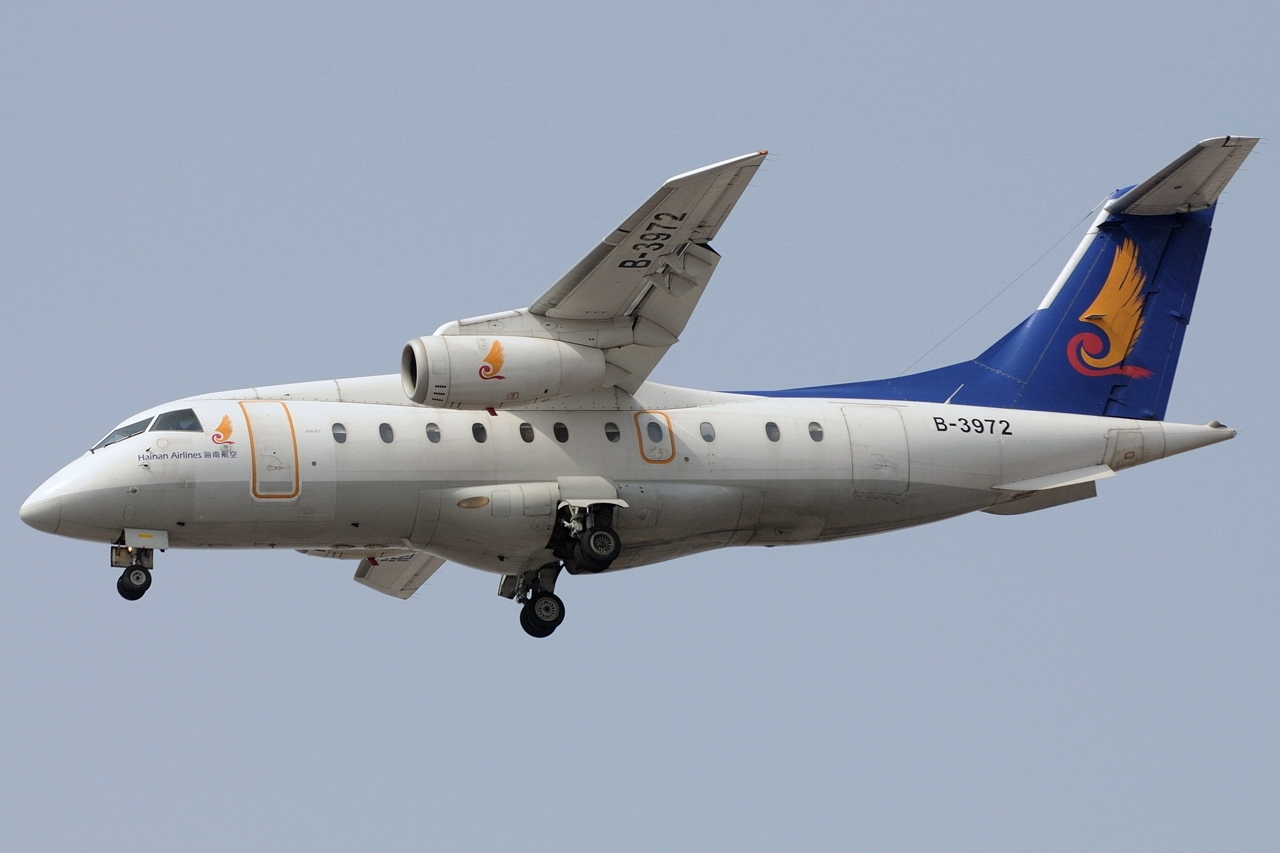
Hainan Airlines Fairchild Dornier 328JET in 2009

== Cabin ==
=== Business Class ===
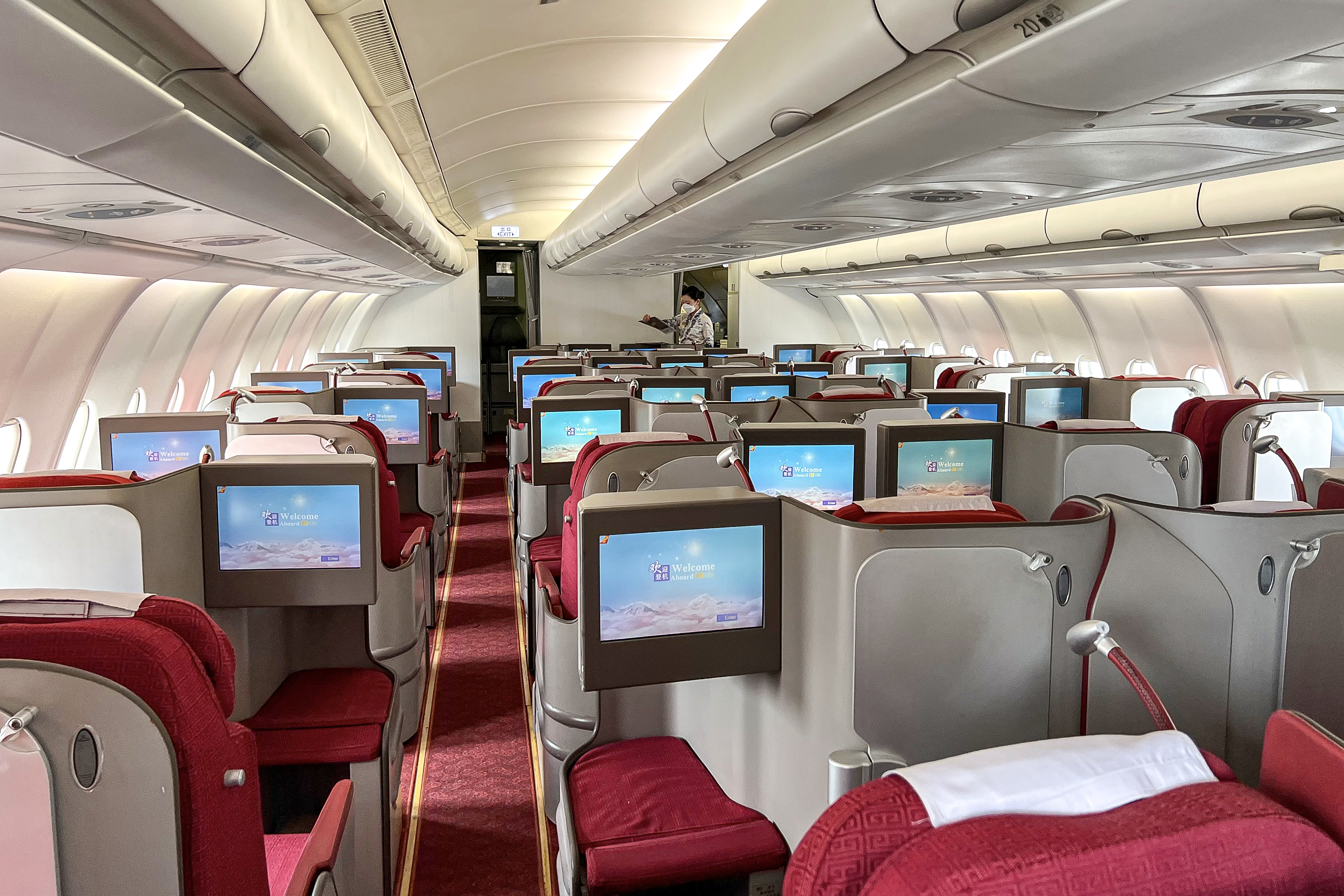
Hainan Airlines business class on an Airbus A330 aircraft

Business class is available on all Hainan Airlines aircraft. Business class on the Airbus A330-200 is configured in a 2-2-2 configuration. The seats has a 74-inch seat pitch and a 10.6-inch personal entertainment system. Business class on the Airbus A330-300 features a 1-2-1 configuration. The seats are in a reversed herringbone layout with a seat pitch of 45-inches. The seats can recline up to 180 degrees and is nearly 2 meters long when converted into a bed. The seats feature a Thales AVANT 15.4-inch touchscreens with touch handle. On the Boeing 787-8 and older Boeing 787-9s, business class features a 2-2-2 configuration and has a seat pitch between 73 and 80-inches. The seats feature a 16-inch touchscreen entertainment system equipped with BOSE noise-reducing head sets. Newer Boeing 787-9s equipped with the "Dream Feather" cabin design have business class seats similar to those on the Airbus A330-300s. The seats however feature increased seat pitch and improved seat fabrics and decor.

=== Premium Economy ===
Premium economy is only available on newer Boeing 787-9 aircraft with the "Dream Feather" cabin design. The seats are designed by Collins MiQ and feature a seven-inch recline, 38-inch seat pitch and a four-way adjustable head rest. The seats also feature a Panasonic EX3 Entertainment System and a 13-inch 1080p HD screen, as well as a USB Charing port, tablet stand and a footrest. Premium economy class seats are located in a separate cabin from the economy class seats.

=== Economy Class ===
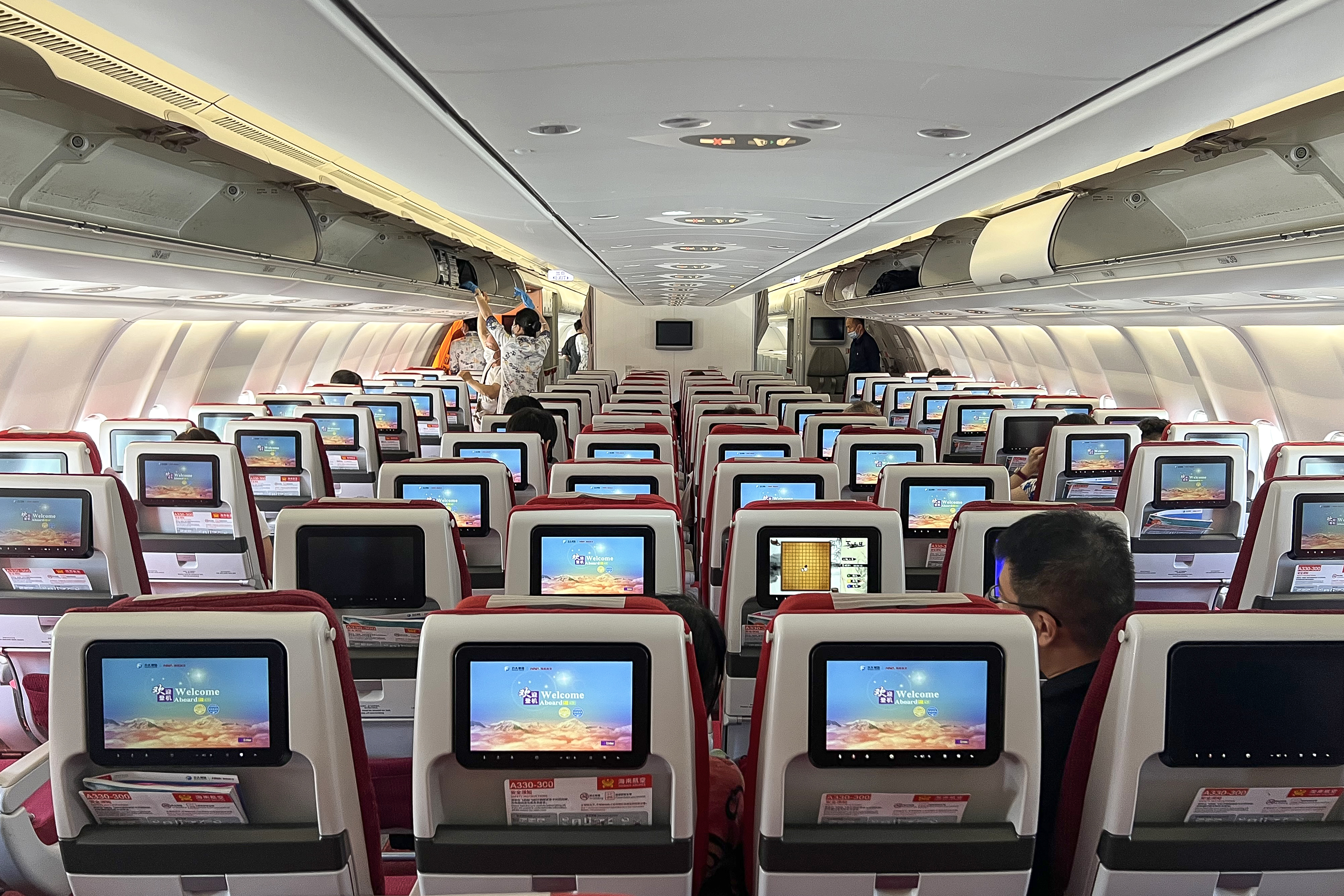
Economy class on a Hainan Airlines Airbus A330 aircraft

Economy class is featured on all Hainan Airlines aircraft. Seats on long haul flights have a seat pitch of 32 inches as well as a 9-12 inch personal entertainment screen. USB ports are also available on newer aircraft.

== Services ==
=== Lounges ===
Hainan Airlines operates several self-owned airport lounges at its main hub and focus cities including Beijing (T1 HNA Exclusive Terminal), Haikou, Xi'an, Guangzhou, and Ürümqi. In addition, the airline will soon open its exclusive international departure lounge at its main international hub Beijing Capital International Airport Terminal 2. The airline also operates an exclusive Transit Lounge for transferring HNA Group passengers at Beijing Airport Non-restricted area.

=== Frequent-flyer program ===
Hainan Airlines's frequent-flyer program is called Fortune Wings Club (simplified Chinese: 金鹏俱乐部; traditional Chinese: 金鵬俱樂部; pinyin: Jīn Péng Jùlèbù). The airlines's subsidiaries Hong Kong Airlines, Lucky Air, Tianjin Airlines, Beijing Capital Airlines, Urumqi Airlines, Suparna Airlines, GX Airlines, Fuzhou Airlines and parent company Grand China Air are also parts of the program. It is also possible for passengers to collect miles on Alaska Airlines, Etihad Airways, Virgin Australia, TAP Portugal and the airlines that have codeshare agreements with Hainan Airlines. Members can earn miles on flights as well as through consumption with Hainan Airlines's credit card. When enough miles are collected, members can be upgraded to Elite members which are divided into four tiers: Fortune Wings Platinum membership, Gold membership, Silver membership, and Flying Card membership. Elite membership gives extra services.

=== Accolades ===
Hainan Airlines is one of ten airlines worldwide rated as five-star by Skytrax, along with All Nippon Airways, Asiana Airlines, Cathay Pacific, EVA Air, Garuda Indonesia, Japan Airlines, Korean Air, Qatar Airways, and Singapore Airlines.

In June 2019, they were ranked #7 in the Skytrax World's Top 10 Airlines of 2019 ratings and were winners in the following additional categories: Best Airline in China: World's Best Business Class Amenities, Best Airline Staff in China, Best Airline Cabin Cleanliness in China, and Best Cabin Crew in China.

== Award and recognition ==
On 24 June 2024, Hainan Airlines was voted 2024 Best Airline in China by Skytrax.

== See also ==
- Transport in China
