= Michael Bruce (entrepreneur) =

British entrepreneur

- Born: June 1973 (age 52)
- Known for: Co-founder and CEO of Purplebricks
- Spouse: Isabel Bruce
- Children: 5
- Relatives: Kenny Bruce (brother)

Michael Bruce (born 28 June 1973) is a British entrepreneur, and the co-founder and ex CEO of the online estate agent Purplebricks.

After studying Law in Southampton, Bruce embarked upon a legal career before purchasing Midlands estate agent Burchell Edwards with his brother Kenny in 2006, eventually selling it to Connells in 2011.

Together with his brother they would go on to found Purplebricks in 2012, with the company floating on the Alternative Investment Market in December 2015 for $300m and increased in value to over $1billion before falling back to £300m by May 2019. Purplebricks has launched in the UK, Australia and the US and raised £100m from Axel Springer. In May 2019, Michael stepped down from his role as Chief Executive.
