= KwikChex =

British online investigations and reputation management

KwikChex is an online investigation and reputation management firm founded by Chris Emmins. It was founded in Bournemouth, United Kingdom in 2010, and moved to Taunton in 2018. It is particularly known for its work in consumer protection, including creating and managing the Timeshare Task Force and for challenging the authenticity of content on online review websites.

== Investigations ==
Emmins believes that TripAdvisor unfairly and inconsistently penalises small businesses when a person connected to the business posts reviews, while larger businesses are not penalised in the same way. He has particularly questioned the integrity of TripAdvisor's Chinese operation: Emmins identified “amazingly prolific” reviewers on the TripAdvisor's Chinese site, including one who had posted 2,633 reviews between 2010 and 2014. In 2010 the company was canvassing a group defamation action against TripAdvisor for carrying hostile reviews invented or exaggerated, or posted by business rivals.

In September 2011 KwikChex and two hotels filed a complaint with the UK Advertising Standards Authority challenging online reviews site TripAdvisor’s claims to provide trustworthy and honest reviews from real travellers. The Advertising Standards Authority found that TripAdvisor "should not claim or imply that all its reviews were from real travellers, or were honest, real or trusted", and as a result of the investigation, the complaint was upheld and TripAdvisor was ordered to remove the slogan "reviews you can trust" from its UK website. It changed its hotel review section slogan to "reviews from our community".

In 2013, a KwikChex investigation exposed Accor Hotels executive Peter Hook as the person behind anonymous, glowing reviews of Accor’s own hotels and of negative reviews on competitor hotels. His reviews, included one for Accor’s Sofitel Phnom Penh Phokeethra which read “I didn't know much about the hotel scene so booked a brand I knew well. It turned out to be a good choice”.

In 2015, Emmins appeared on a BBC News investigations programme after a KwikChex investigation revealed that most of the reviews on online reviews site Trustpilot for a business named Bizzyloans, were fake and that one involved identity theft, using the name and picture of a woman who had died.

In October 2018, Emmins appeared on a BBC News investigation programme concerning the food hygiene standards of businesses providing food through online delivery business Just Eat. The programme showed that many food providers on the Just Eat platform were officially rated as having failed official heath inspections. Emmins called for Just Eat to display the official Food Standards Agency hygiene rating for each food provider on their individual entry. In June 2019, following extensive further critical media coverage, Just Eat commenced displaying the official ratings of a provider on their website.

In September 2019, Wired magazine published details of a KwikChex investigation into reviews of estate agent Purplebricks published on online reviews website Trustpilot. The article detailed how KwikChex had found the ways that Purplebricks was manipulating reviews and rating results on the Trustpilot site.

On the 10th of February 2022, KwikChex was featured in an article in the UK Mirror newspaper following a joint investigation on cryptocurrency reviews on the Trustpilot site.

In April 2025, KwikChex founder Chris Emmins appeared on the BBC programme Rip Off Britain, contributing to an investigation into Central Paralegals, a company accused of targeting timeshare owners with fraudulent legal services.

In October 2025, The Guardian reported on an investigation by KwikChex into suspected scam investment firms exploiting the Trustpilot reviews platform.

In May 2026, KwikChex and its founder Chris Emmins featured on the BBC programme Rip Off Britain, assisting with an investigation into Seasons Holidays' fractional ownership products. The programme examined allegations that purchasers had been led to believe they were buying products with investment potential and long-term financial value, despite concerns raised about their resale value and financial performance.

In June 2026, Forbes highlighted the growing threat of "ghost stores", fraudulent e-commerce websites that use artificial intelligence and other sophisticated digital tools to deceive consumers and undermine legitimate retailers. The article featured comments from KwikChex founder Chris Emmins, who warned about the scale of the problem and argued for the introduction of "accredited integrity" measures to help consumers identify legitimate online businesses.

Following publication of the article, RetailWire opened an industry discussion examining possible solutions to AI-generated fake retailers and measures that could help protect consumers and legitimate businesses.

== Awards ==
In June 2019, KwikChex received a ‘Hero Award’ from the Chartered Trading Standards Institute (CTSI) "for its continuous work and passionate commitment on behalf of consumers, particularly around timeshare scams". Chief Executive at CTSI, Leon Livermore, said: “The Business Award is designed to recognise businesses that demonstrate a dedication to protecting consumers. KwikChex not only strives to help consumers who have suffered at the hands of ruthless fraudsters but have been a strong supporter of our profession. I’m pleased to name them our 2019 Business Hero”.
