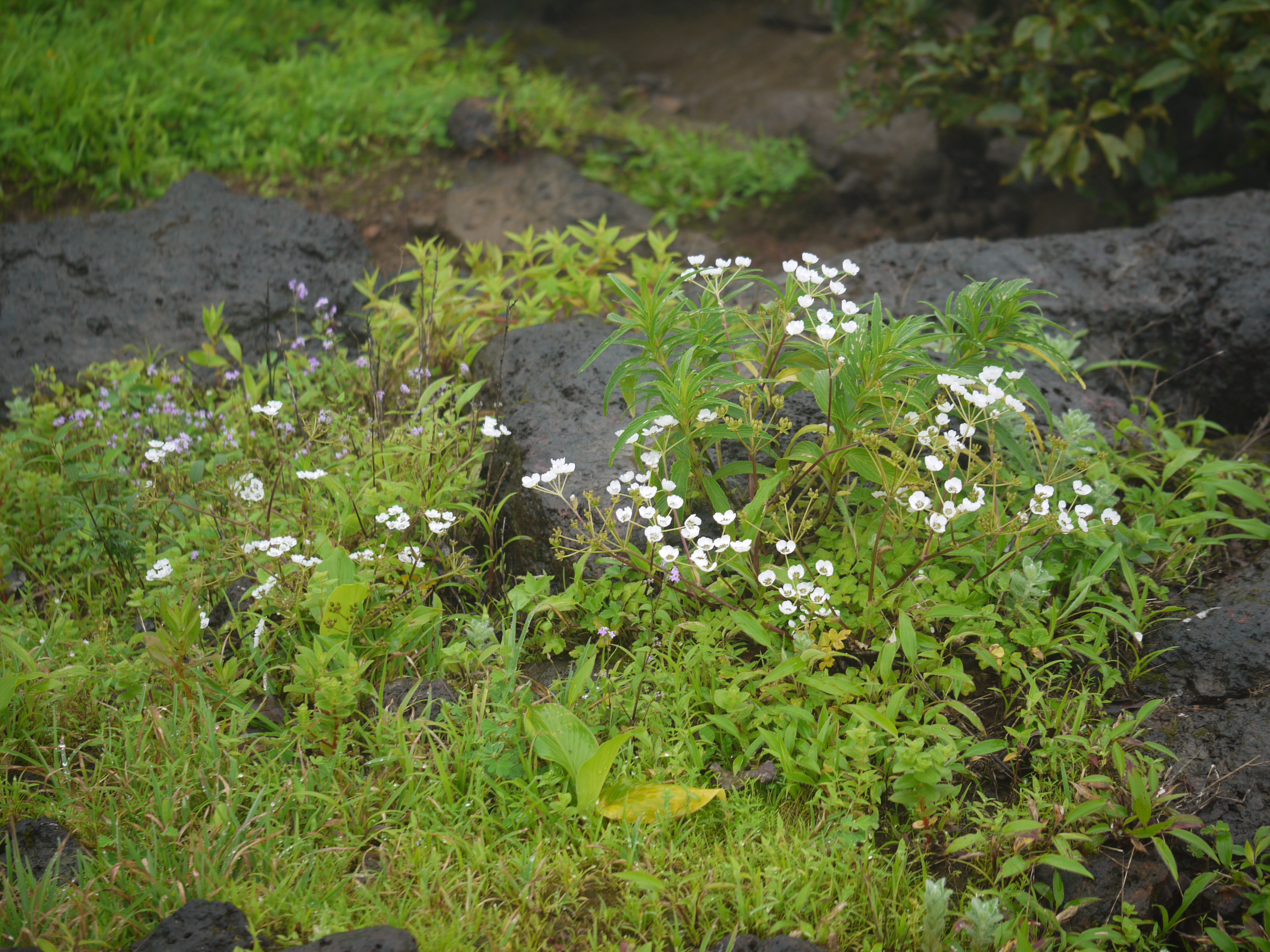
- Pinda concanensis

Scientific classification
- Kingdom: Plantae
- Clade: Tracheophytes
- Clade: Angiosperms
- Clade: Eudicots
- Clade: Asterids
- Order: Apiales
- Family: Apiaceae
- Subfamily: Apioideae
- Tribe: Tordylieae
- Subtribe: Tordyliinae
- Genus: Pinda; P.K.Mukh. & Constance

= Pinda (plant) =

Genus of flowering plants

Pinda is a genus of flowering plants in the family Apiaceae. It includes two species endemic to India.

- Pinda concanensis (Dalzell) P.K.Mukh. & Constance
- Pinda shrirangii Gosavi & Chandore
