= Pindar Van Arman =

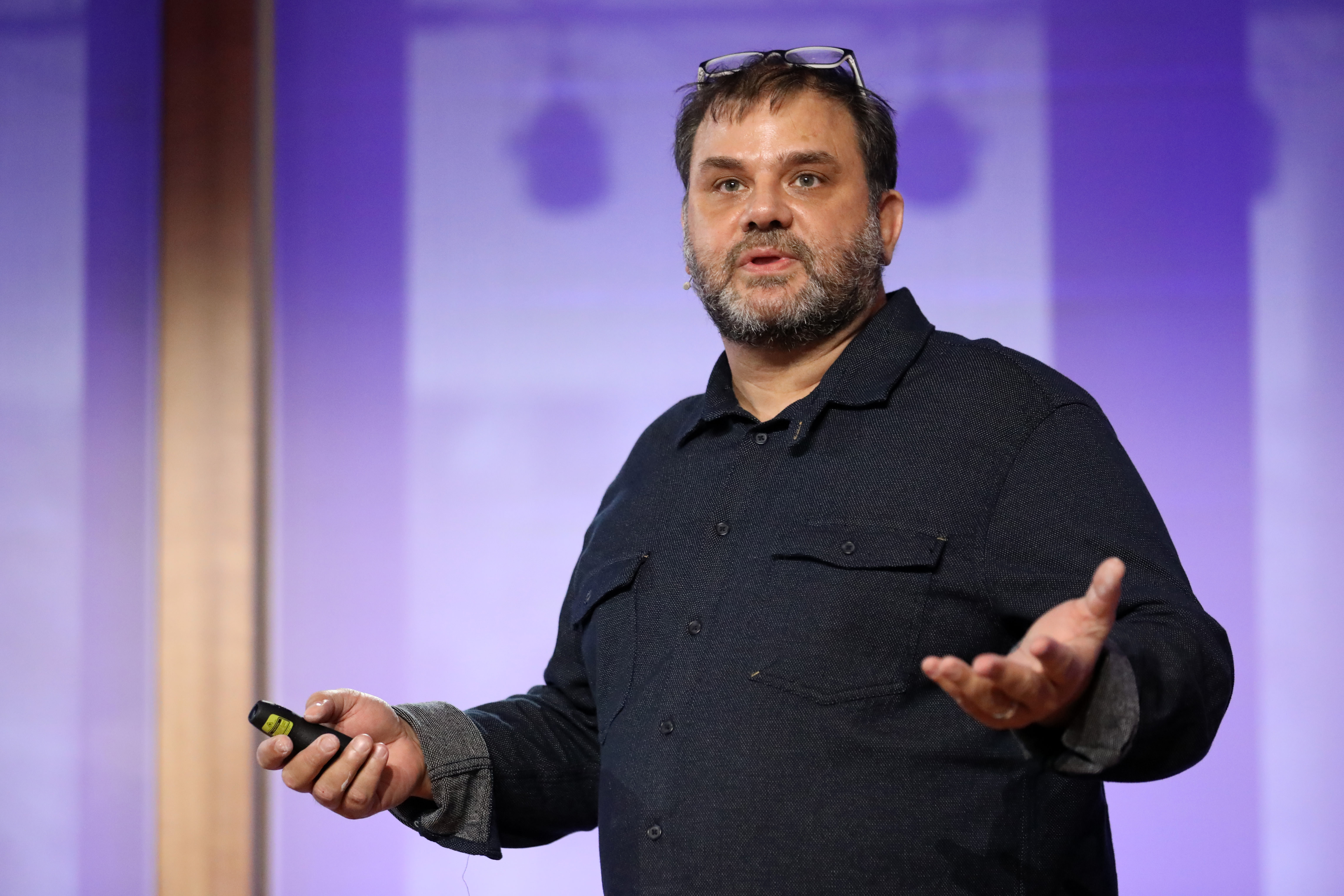
- Pindar Van Arman speaking at the Aspen A.I. Conference in Berlin, 2018
- Education: Ohio Wesleyan University
- Website: cloudpainter.com

Pindar Van Arman is an American artist and roboticist based in Washington, D.C. His art focuses on designing painting robots that explore the differences between human and computational creativity. Since his first system in 2005, he has built multiple artificially creative robots, including CrowdPainter, bitPaintr, and CloudPainter. His robotic systems typically paint with a brush on stretched canvas and have recently begun to concentrate on creative portraiture.

His work with CloudPainter was awarded First Place in Robot Art 2018, an annual AI and robotics art competition. Judges of the contest noted that "CloudPainter was able to paint evocative portraits with varying degrees of abstraction."

Van Arman graduated from Ohio Wesleyan University in 1996 and went on to get his Masters from the Corcoran School of the Arts and Design at George Washington University in 2010.
