= John Yonge Akerman =

English antiquarian (1806–1873)

John Yonge Akerman FSA (1806–1873) was an English antiquarian specializing mainly in numismatics. Also an author of fiction and non-fiction, he published some of his work as J. Y, Akerman or J. Y. A, and under the pseudonym Paul Pindar.

== Life ==
Akerman was born in London on 12 June 1806. In early life he became secretary to William Cobbett; in 1838 to the London and Greenwich Railway Company; and later to Lord Albert Conyngham (afterwards Lord Londesborough).

In January 1834, Akerman was elected a fellow of the Society of Antiquaries. In the autumn of 1848 he became joint secretary with Sir Henry Ellis, and five years later, sole secretary. He held the post until 1860, when poor health compelled him to resign it and the editorship of the Archæologia.

In 1836, at a time when there was no English periodical of the kind, he started, chiefly at his own expense, a publication called the Numismatic Journal, two volumes of which appeared under his editorship. He helped to form the Numismatic Society of London, which held its first regular meeting in December 1836. Akerman was secretary from then until 1860, and editor of the society's journal, first published in 1838 as the Numismatic Chronicle. From 1869, Akerman lived at Abingdon, where he died 18 November 1873.

== Publications ==
Akerman published a considerable number of works on coins, the more important being:

- Catalogue of Roman Coins (1839);
- Numismatic Manual (1840);
- Roman Coins relating to Britain (1844);
- Ancient Coins--Hispania, Gallia, Britannia (1846);
- Numismatic Illustrations of the New Testament (1846).

He also wrote :

- The Adopted Son; A Legend of the Rebellion of Jack Cade (1842) (under the pseudonym "Paul Pindar")
- Glossary of Words used in Wiltshire (1842);
- Spring-Tide; or, The Angler and His Friends (1850);
- Wiltshire Tales, illustrative of the Dialect (1853);
- Remains of Pagan Saxondom (1855).

Works of Speculative Fiction

- George Child's Second Love (1843);
- The Miniature (1844).
