= Paul Pindar (businessman) =

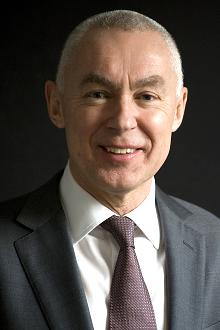
- Born: 11 April 1959 (age 66)
- Education: Ranelagh School, Bracknell
- Alma mater: Swansea University
- Occupation: Businessman
- Years active: 1984–present
- Title: former CEO, Capita plc
- Term: 1999–2014
- Successor: Andy Parker
- Spouse: Sharon Pindar
- Children: 2

Paul Richard Martin Pindar (born 11 April 1959) is an English businessman. He is best known for his 23-year tenure as managing director and chief executive of Capita plc, a provider of business process outsourcing (BPO) services in the UK.

== Career ==
Pindar trained as a chartered accountant with Coopers & Lybrand, qualifying in 1984, before joining private equity firm 3i as investment controller.

=== Capita ===
Pindar joined Capita in 1987, initially as finance director, then managing director in 1991, and chief executive in 1999. He was the third-longest serving FTSE 100 CEO after Martin Sorrell and Aidan Heavey when he stood down in 2014.

He joined the business after advising on the £330,000 management buyout (MBO) while working for 3i. When he joined Capita, it had 33 employees and revenues of £1.3 million. The company was subsequently floated on the USM in 1989 with a market capitalisation of £8 million.

On 18 November 2013, Pindar announced that he would be stepping down from his role at the end of February 2014 to focus on opportunities within private equity. When he left the business in February 2014, Capita had more than 62,000 employees and a market capitalisation of £7.5 billion.

=== Other activities ===
Pindar was a non-executive director of retailer Debenhams plc from 2006 to 2010 and in July 2012 he was appointed non-executive chairman of Integrated Dental Holdings (IDH), the largest chain of dental practices in the UK with over 500 surgeries, backed by Carlyle Group.

Following his departure from Capita in February 2014, Pindar became chairman of Independent Clinical Services (ICS) in June 2014 following its acquisition by TowerBrook from Blackstone. He has also invested and joined the board of a number of smaller businesses. He backed the MBO of International Travel Connections (ITC), a luxury travel business, and became chairman in August 2014.

He was also an early investor in Purplebricks, a start-up online estate agency. He introduced the business to Neil Woodford who led two rounds of fundraising prior to an IPO of the business in December 2015. The IPO was just 19 months after the launch of the business and valued it at £240m, raising £58m from institutional investors. Pindar became non-executive chairman upon the IPO, moving from his existing NED role with the business.

Previously he has also been chairman of the NSPCC's Corporate Development Board (2004–2007) before becoming chairman of Great Ormond Street Hospital's Corporate Partnerships Board (2008–2012).

Pindar is currently a member of TowerBrook Capital Partners' senior advisory board.
