= Purplebricks =

UK estate agent

Purplebricks Group PLC
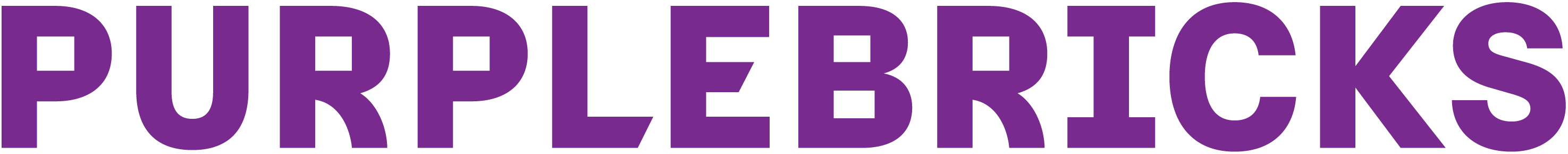
- Type: Public
- Traded as: AIM: PURP
- Industry: Internet & Real Estate
- Founded: 2012
- Headquarters: London, United Kingdom
- Key people: Paul Pindar (Non-Executive Chairman); Gillian Draper (CEO), Stephen Anthony Long (CFO)
- Revenue: £111.1 million (2020)
- Operating income: -£9.4 million (2020)
- Website: www.purplebricks.com

Purplebricks is a British online estate agent, which operates in the UK. Founded in 2012 by Michael Bruce, Kenny Bruce and David Shepherd, it is backed by investors that include venture capital firm DN Capital as well as Neil Woodford, Paul Pindar, and Errol Damelin.

== History ==
=== Early history ===
Michael Bruce, Kenny Bruce and David Shepherd conceived their idea for an online estate agency in 2012. Property sales in the United Kingdom had historically been handled by traditional (or "high street") estate agencies. The brothers previously led one such agency, Burchell Edwards. They believed a lower-cost, digital model for residential property sales could be developed that reduced expenses associated with running a chain of physical offices.

The name “Purplebricks” was chosen for this venture while brainstorming around a kitchen table. The founders felt the colour purple symbolised "regalness", while "bricks" reflected property and technology, and “Purplebricks” would be a recognisable brand name.

The corporate parent of Purplebricks was initially registered in April 2012 with the name New Portal Limited. In October 2012, the name was changed to New Broom Limited, signalling a desire to sweep clean the existing UK residential property market and bring about a fresh approach. Early investors included DN Capital, the London-based technology fund founded by Steve Schlenker and Nenad Marovac, Paul Pindar, the former CEO of Capita, Martin Bolland, Capita's then non-executive chairman, and Errol Damelin, the founder of Wonga.

In April 2014, Purplebricks publicly launched and began listing homes in the United Kingdom, although initially only within parts of southern England. In August, the company raised £8m of equity investment led by fund manager Neil Woodford, who acquired a 30 percent stake in the company. By May 2015, operations expanded into other regions of England and Wales, and plans were announced for a possible stock market listing. The company appointed Canaccord Genuity to oversee the potential float. Expansion into Northern Ireland and Scotland followed in June and November.

=== Becoming public ===
In December 2015, Purplebricks formally announced its plan to launch on AIM later that month, making it the first online estate agency to debut on the stock market. Ahead of the float, the company stated that it had 4,300 residential properties listed for sale—nearly twice the number of the next largest online agency—and intended to use raised funds to further boost its national presence, acquire more agents, and invest in the brand and technology. The company also announced it had already sold £58 million worth of shares, primarily to three major corporate investors: Old Mutual, Artemis, and Fidelity. As part of the IPO process, the corporate parent of Purplebricks, New Broom Limited, re-registered as a public limited company with the name Purplebricks Groups Limited. Shares began trading on 17 December. Just under a quarter of the company sold to investors, valuing the online estate agent at £240.2 million.

=== Further growth and international expansion ===
In June 2016, Purplebricks announced that it had recruited an Australian management team and planned to launch its platform in the country. In August, Purplebricks launched a media campaign in Australia about the company's fixed-price property marketing, and formally launched its operations there later that month. In 2017, Purplebricks’ Australian subsidiary generated a £6.1 million loss with £3.9 million spent on administration costs and £3.8 million spent on marketing and PR-related costs.

Purplebricks expanded into the United States in 2017, beginning operations in Los Angeles before moving into San Diego, Sacramento, Fresno, and then New York in 2018. The expansion was supported by more than $60 million in funds raised through a special stock offering. Purplebricks' business proposition remained essentially the same for U.S. customers: the company charged a listing fee of $3,200, which sellers were required to pay regardless of whether their home sold.

In August 2017, Purplebricks was featured on BBC's Watchdog following an investigation into claims of misleading customers. In September 2017, consumer review website Trustpilot issued an open letter clarifying its Purplebricks review policy following allegations concerning the “validity of reviews of Purplebricks by customers”. That same month, the company was accused of “corporate bullying” following suspension from estate agent review website allAgents.co.uk. Purplebricks threatened the consumer review website with legal action over the publication of negative reviews due to the site's lack of vetting for those leaving reviews.

In July 2018, Purplebricks expanded their operations into Canada through the $38 million acquisition of DPCF, a Canadian real estate company that also positioned itself as "commission-free". The acquisition announcement noted that DPCF would continue to be led by the existing management team.

In October 2018, Purplebricks announced it would enter the European market through a joint venture with digital publisher Axel Springer SE. The two companies would jointly purchase a 25.9% stake in Homeday, a German online estate agent. Like Purplebricks, Homeday markets itself by highlighting its lower selling fees compared to traditional agents.

Forbes magazine reported in January 2020 that an email was sent from Purplebricks Canada's marketing department to all employees asking for positive reviews from friends and family regardless of whether they had had any business dealings with the company. In exchange it was reported that the employee that facilitated the most reviews would receive a paid day off.

In June 2020, Purplebricks, Axel Springer, and venture capital firm Project A made further investments in Homeday to help the company expand its operations.

=== International financial losses ===
In August 2018, the Australian Financial Review (AFR) reported troubling management and lacklustre sales issues. In February 2019, Purplebricks' share price dropped sharply after it lowered its US and Australia revenue forecasts. In May 2019, Purplebricks vowed to shut down operations in Australia due to lack of profitability, after reporting an $18m interim loss for the six months to October. This came days after the company's then CEO, Michael Bruce was laid off after disagreements with Paul Pindar over the failed overseas expansion. The AFR reported that "increasingly challenging market conditions" and "execution errors" contributed to Purplebricks closure of Australian operations.

In July 2019, new CEO Vic Darvey announced that Purplebricks would be shutting down operations in the United States, announcing that operating costs had risen to almost £52.3 million, said that it would focus its attention on Britain and Canada.

In 2020, the company reported revenue of £111.1 million and an operating income of -£9.4 million.

On July 15, 2020 Desjardins Group announced that they were purchasing the Canadian business of Purplebricks Group PLC for US$60.5 million. It was reported that in the first year of operation, Purplebricks Canada ran an operating loss of US$4.8m. According to BNN Bloomberg at the time of the acquisition, Purplebricks Canada and DuProprio had "more than 500 employees in Quebec, Ontario, Manitoba and Alberta". Desjardins was permitted to use the Purplebricks brand and logos until December 2020.

In August 2021, Purplebricks announced its strategic focus was now "fully on the UK", where it planned to accelerate its model, extend its market share, and continue to grow revenue.

In December 2021, Purplebricks delayed publication of its results and warned shareholders that it could be forced to pay up to £9 million in compensation to tenants of its landlords. It said that during an internal review it discovered a regulatory “process issue in how it has been communicating with tenants on behalf of its landlords in relation to deposit registrations”.

=== Sold for £1.00 ===
Strike, the Charles Dunstone-backed competitor, acquired Purplebricks, for a nominal amount of £1, posing a significant risk of redundancy for its workforce of over 750 employees. Purplebricks, which experienced a peak valuation of over £1.3 billion, underwent a change in ownership in 2023.

=== Controversy ===
In July 2025, a BBC panorama article and show titled “Undercover Estate Agent” mentioned purplebricks and how it was making you overpay for their affiliate services- like mortgages. It also revealed some secret footage that showed how they’d get more pay if you get them to pay for their overpriced services.

On 22 September 2026, HMRC petitioned to wind up the company. The petition was later withdrew by HMRC following further dialogue between Purplebricks and HMRC.

== Business model ==
Purplebricks is a technology-led estate agency that provides a hybrid service, as it combines the use of an online platform and local property agents. Vendors and landlords can manage their property let or sale using the online platform and app. The local property agents assist with valuations, listings, and other ancillary services. The company does not maintain a branch network of brick-and-mortar estate agencies, which reduces fixed costs associated with rent, energy usage, and other operational expenses. In part due to these savings, Purplebricks charges customers lower fixed fees.

Purplebricks charges a fixed upfront fee for its services that sellers pay to be listed, rather than a percentage of the sale price once the property sells. This fee includes consultation services from a local agent, photography of the property, listings on property portals like Rightmove and Zoopla, and management of the sales process. Payment may be made when the property is listed or after a ten month deferral. This approach is different from the commission-based structures of traditional estate agencies, in which agents are paid their fee only if the property sells.

Local agents are referred to as “local property experts” and work remotely in their local area. Agents visit the seller’s home directly to discuss the sale and value the property—and, once instructed, to provide services, including creating a floorplan of the property, taking pictures, and providing assistance with other aspects of online marketing. For an additional fee, agents can lead viewings of the property. They may also assist with negotiations when selling.

=== Brand and marketing ===
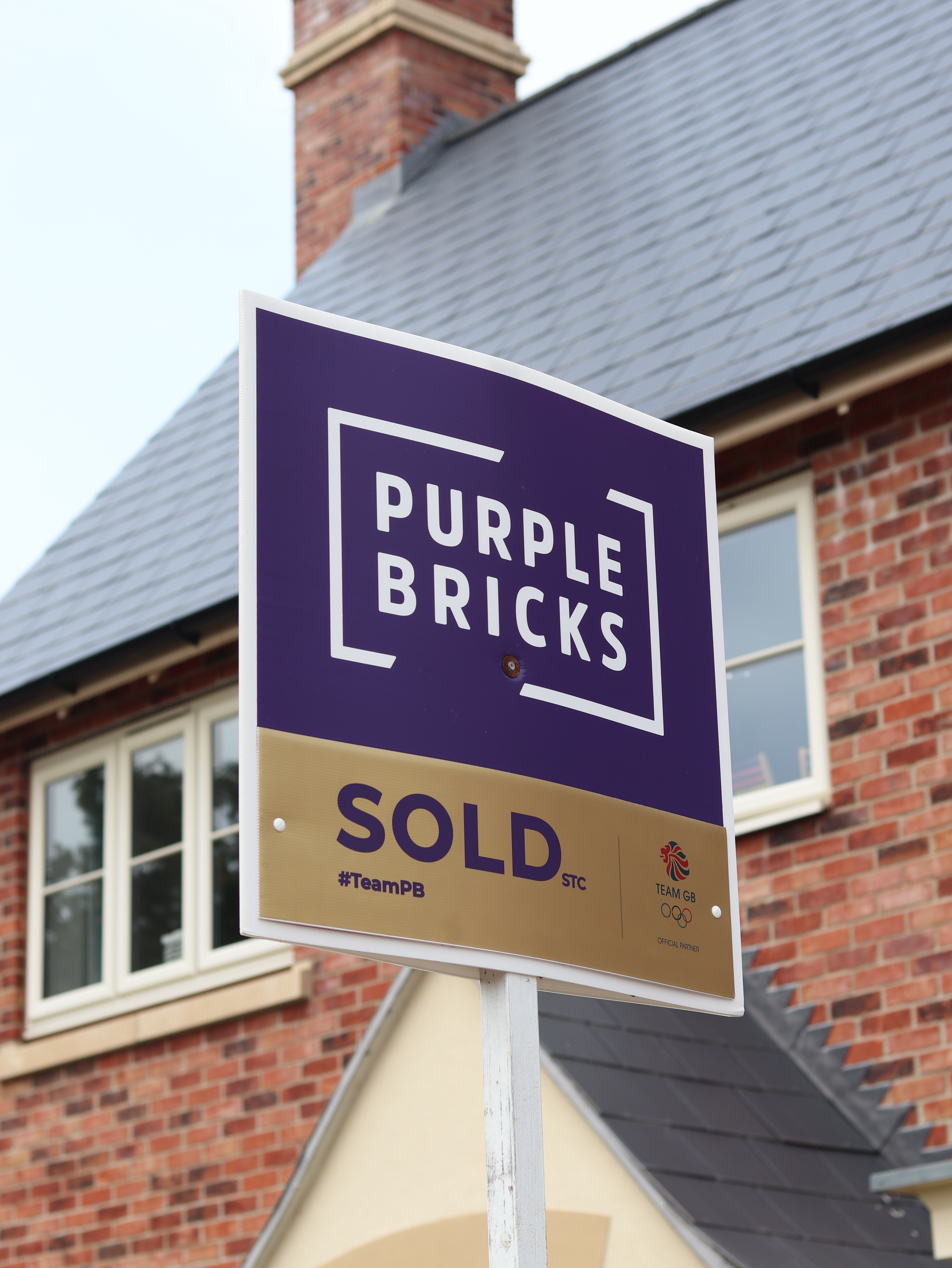

Purplebricks' commission-free, hybrid agency business model was intended to disrupt the UK residential property market. Marketing has been a central element of the company's business strategy. In 2016, Purplebricks began using the tagline "commisery", meaning the misery home sellers feel about paying commission, to distinguish itself from traditional real estate agencies. A full advertising campaign about the concept followed the next year, and ran extensively in the UK, US, and Australia. The campaign won an Effectiveness Award from the Institute of Practitioners in Advertising in 2018 for demonstrating proof on payback on marketing communications, as the campaign contributed to a 218 percent growth in revenue.

In 2019, Purplebricks was added to the Superbrands list, which tracks consumer perception of brand and marketing activity. Purplebricks' presence on the list was seen as an indication that the company had established itself as a household name. In 2020, Purplebricks claimed to have achieved 98 percent brand awareness within the UK.

In 2021, Purplebricks arranged a product placement on the British soap opera series Coronation Street. The company was featured as the estate agent that would be selling the show's fictional Rovers Return Inn. The appearance of the Purplebricks sign above the pub marked the first time a firm had integrated a product into one of the show's storylines.

In 2024, ITV agreed to support Strike/Purplebricks with £1.5 million in convertible loan notes. However, only a few months later, the BBC heavily criticised Purplebricks following numerous complaints from unsatisfied clients whose homes failed to sell. These clients reported having to pay for a purportedly free service that did not succeed in finding buyers.
