= List of China Eastern Airlines destinations =

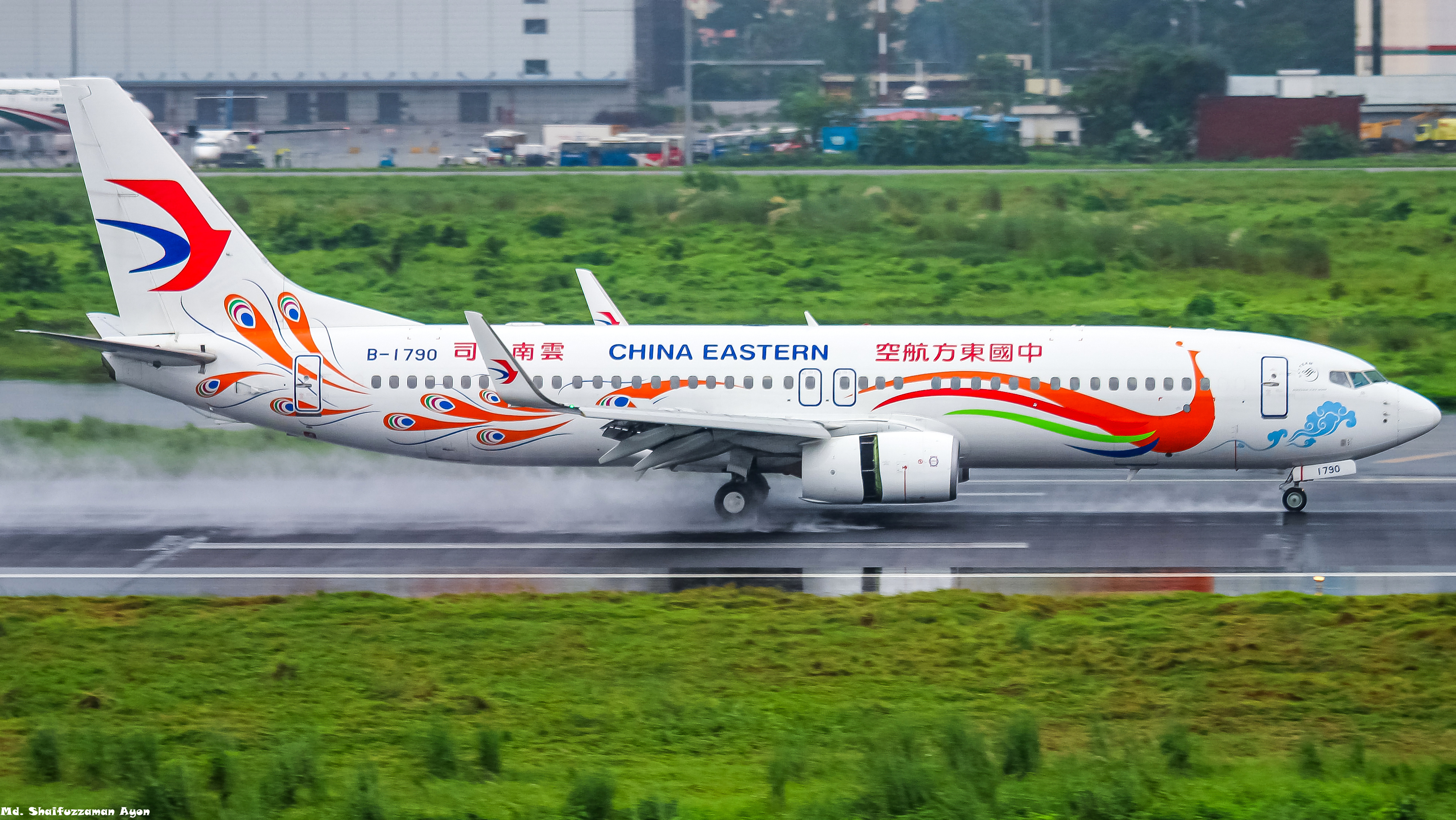
China Eastern Airlines Boeing 737-800, registered as B-1790, landing at Hazrat Shahjalal International Airport in 2025.

China Eastern Airlines, one of China's three major airlines, flies (or has flown) to the following destinations as of 2025. With a network of over 200 destinations, this list excludes any flights flown through codeshare agreements as well as any the airline's subsidiaries.

== List ==
Hub
Focus city
Future destination
Seasonal destination
Terminated destination

City	Province/region	Country/region	IATA	ICAO	Airport	Refs
Abu Dhabi	Emirate of Abu Dhabi	United Arab Emirates	AUH	OMAA	Zayed International Airport	
Addis Ababa	Addis Ababa	Ethiopia	ADD	HAAB	Addis Ababa International Airport	
Adelaide	South Australia	Australia	ADL	YPAD	Adelaide Airport	
Almaty	Almaty	Kazakhstan	ALA	UAAA	Almaty International Airport	
Altay	Xinjiang	China	AAT	ZWAT	Altay Xuedu Airport	
Amsterdam	North Holland	Netherlands	AMS	EHAM	Amsterdam Airport Schiphol	
Anchorage	Alaska	United States	ANC	PANC	Ted Stevens Anchorage International Airport	
Anqing	Anhui	China	AQG	ZSAQ	Anqing Tianzhushan Airport	
Anshun	Guizhou	China	AVA	ZUAS	Anshun Huangguoshu Airport	
Asahikawa	Hokkaido	Japan	AKJ	RJEC	Asahikawa Airport	
Auckland	Auckland Region	New Zealand	AKL	NZAA	Auckland Airport	
Baise	Guangxi	China	AEB	ZGBS	Baise Bama Airport	
Baishan	Jilin	China	NBS	ZYBS	Changbaishan Airport	
Bangkok	Central Thailand	Thailand	DMK	VTBD	Don Mueang International Airport	
Bangkok	Central Thailand	Thailand	BKK	VTBS	Suvarnabhumi Airport	
Baoshan	Yunnan	China	BSD	ZPBS	Baoshan Yunrui Airport	
Baotou	Inner Mongolia	China	BAV	ZBOW	Baotou Airport	
Beijing	Beijing	China	PEK	ZBAA	Beijing Capital International Airport	
Beijing	Beijing	China	PKX	ZBAD	Beijing Daxing International Airport	
Beihai	Guangxi	China	BHY	ZGBH	Beihai Fucheng Airport	
Bole	Xinjiang	China	BPL	ZWBL	Bole Alashankou Airport	
Brisbane	Queensland	Australia	BNE	YBBN	Brisbane Airport	
Brussels	—	Belgium	BRU	EBBR	Brussels Airport	
Buenos Aires	Greater Buenos Aires	Argentina	EZE	SAEZ	Ministro Pistarini International Airport	
Busan	Yeongnam	South Korea	PUS	RKPK	Gimhae International Airport	
Cairo	—	Egypt	CAI	HECA	Cairo International Airport	
Cairns	Queensland	Australia	CNS	YCBS	Cairns Airport	
Cangyuan	Yunnan	China	CWJ	ZPCW	Cangyuan Washan Airport	
Cebu	Central Visayas	Philippines	CEB	RPVM	Mactan–Cebu International Airport	
Changchun	Jilin	China	CGQ	ZYCC	Changchun Longjia International Airport	
Changde	Hunan	China	CGD	ZGCD	Changde Taohuayuan Airport	
Changsha	Hunan	China	CSX	ZGHA	Changsha Huanghua International Airport	
Changzhi	Shanxi	China	CIH	ZBCZ	Changzhi Wangcun Airport	
Changzhou	Jiangsu	China	CZX	ZSCG	Changzhou Benniu Airport	
Chengdu	Sichuan	China	CTU	ZUUU	Chengdu Shuangliu International Airport	
Chengdu	Sichuan	China	TFU	ZUTF	Chengdu Tianfu International Airport	
Cheongju	Hoseo	South Korea	CJJ	RKTU	Cheongju International Airport	
Chiang Mai	Chiang Mai Province	Thailand	CNX	VTCC	Chiang Mai International Airport	
Chiang Rai	Chiang Rai Province	Thailand	CEI	VTCT	Chiang Rai International Airport	
Chicago	Illinois	United States	ORD	KORD	O'Hare International Airport	
Chifeng	Inner Mongolia	China	CIF	ZBCF	Chifeng Yulong Airport	
Chizhou	Anhui	China	JUH	ZSJH	Chizhou Jiuhuashan Airport	
Chongqing	Chongqing	China	CKG	ZUCK	Chongqing Jiangbei International Airport	
Clark	Pampanga	Philippines	CRK	RPLC	Clark International Airport	
Colombo	Western Province	Sri Lanka	CMB	VCBI	Bandaranaike International Airport	
Copenhagen	Capital Region of Denmark	Denmark	CPH	EKCH	Copenhagen Airport	
Da Nang	—	Vietnam	DAD	VVDN	Da Nang International Airport	
Daegu	Yeongnam	South Korea	TAE	RKTN	Daegu International Airport	
Dali	Yunnan	China	DLU	ZPDL	Dali Airport	
Dalian	Liaoning	China	DLC	ZYTL	Dalian Zhoushuizi International Airport	
Dandong	Liaoning	China	DDG	ZYDD	Dandong Langtou Airport	
Daocheng	Sichuan	China	DCY	ZUDC	Daocheng Yading Airport	
Daqing	Heilongjiang	China	DQA	ZYDQ	Daqing Sartu Airport	
Datong	Shanxi	China	DAT	ZBDT	Datong Airport	
Dazhou	Sichuan	China	DZH	ZUDX	Dazhou Heshi Airport	
Delingha	Qinghai	China	HXD	ZLDL	Delingha Airport	
Delhi	Delhi	India	DEL	VIDP	Indira Gandhi International Airport	
Denpasar	Bali	Indonesia	DPS	WADD	Ngurah Rai International Airport	
Dublin	Collinstown	Ireland	DUB	EIDW	Dublin Airport	
Dhaka	Dhaka Division	Bangladesh	DAC	VGHS	Shahjalal International Airport	
Dongying	Shandong	China	DOY	ZSDY	Dongying Shengli Airport	
Dubai	Emirate of Dubai	United Arab Emirates	DXB	OMDB	Dubai International Airport	
Dunhuang	Gansu	China	DNH	ZLDH	Dunhuang Airport	
Enshi	Hubei	China	ENH	ZHES	Enshi Airport	
Frankfurt	Hesse	Germany	FRA	EDDF	Frankfurt Airport	
Fukushima	Tōhoku	Japan	FKS	RJSF	Fukushima Airport	
Fukuoka	Kyushu	Japan	FUK	RJFF	Fukuoka Airport	
Fuzhou	Fujian	China	FOC	ZSFZ	Fuzhou Changle International Airport	
Ganzhou	Jiangxi	China	KOW	ZSGZ	Ganzhou Huangjin Airport	
Ganzhou	Jiangxi	China	JRJ	ZSRJ	Ganzhou Ruijin Airport	
Geneva	Canton of Geneva	Switzerland	GVA	LSGG	Geneva Airport	
Golmud	Qinghai	China	GOQ	ZLGM	Golmud Airport	
Guangzhou	Guangdong	China	CAN	ZGGG	Guangzhou Baiyun International Airport	
Guangyuan	Sichuan	China	GYS	ZUGU	Guangyuan Panlong Airport	
Golog	Qinghai	China	GMQ	ZLGL	Golog Maqin Airport	
Guiyang	Guizhou	China	KWE	ZUGY	Guiyang Longdongbao International Airport	
Guilin	Guangxi	China	KWL	ZGKL	Guilin Liangjiang International Airport	
Gwangju	Honam	South Korea	KWJ	RKJJ	Gwangju Airport	
Haikou	Hainan	China	HAK	ZJHK	Haikou Meilan International Airport	
Hakodate	Hokkaido	Japan	HKD	RJCH	Hakodate Airport	
Hambantota	Southern Province	Sri Lanka	HRI	VCRI	Mattala Rajapaksa International Airport	
Hamburg	—	Germany	HAM	EDDH	Hamburg Airport	
Hami City	Xinjiang	China	HMI	ZWHM	Hami Airport	
Hanamaki	Tōhoku	Japan	HNA	RJSI	Hanamaki Airport	
Handan	Hebei	China	HDG	ZBHD	Handan Airport	
Hangzhou	Zhejiang	China	HGH	ZSHC	Hangzhou Xiaoshan International Airport	
Hanzhong	Shaanxi	China	HZG	ZLHZ	Hanzhong Chenggu Airport	
Hanoi	—	Vietnam	HAN	VVNB	Noi Bai International Airport	
Harbin	Heilongjiang	China	HRB	ZYHB	Harbin Taiping International Airport	
Hefei	Anhui	China	~~HFE~~	~~ZSOF~~	Hefei Luogang Airport	
Hefei	Anhui	China	HFE	ZSOF	Hefei Xinqiao International Airport	
Heihe	Heilongjiang	China	HEK	ZYHE	Heihe Aihui Airport	
Hengyang	Hunan	China	HNY	ZGHY	Hengyang Nanyue Airport	
Hiroshima	Chūgoku	Japan	HIJ	RJOA	Hiroshima Airport	
Ho Chi Minh City	—	Vietnam	SGN	VVTS	Tan Son Nhat International Airport	
Hohhot	Inner Mongolia	China	HET	ZBHH	Hohhot Baita International Airport	
Hong Kong	—	Hong Kong	HKG	VHHH	Hong Kong International Airport	
Hong Kong	—	Hong Kong	~~HKG~~	~~VHHH~~	Kai Tak Airport	
Honolulu	Hawaii	United States	HNL	PHNL	Daniel K. Inouye International Airport	
Hotan	Xinjiang	China	HTN	ZWTN	Hotan Airport	
Huai'an	Jiangsu	China	HIA	ZSSH	Huai'an Lianshui Airport	
Huangshan	Anhui	China	TXN	ZSTX	Huangshan Tunxi International Airport	
Huizhou	Guangdong	China	HUZ	ZGHZ	Huizhou Pingtan Airport	
Hulunbuir	Inner Mongolia	China	HLD	ZBLA	Hulunbuir Hailar Airport	
Istanbul	Marmara	Turkey	IST	LTFM	Istanbul Airport	
Irkutsk	Irkutsk Oblast	Russia	IKT	UIII	International Airport Irkutsk	
Jakarta	Banten	Indonesia	CGK	WIII	Soekarno–Hatta International Airport	
Jeju	Jeju Province	South Korea	CJU	RKPC	Jeju International Airport	
Ji'an	Jiangxi	China	JGS	ZLJN	Jinggangshan Airport	
Jiagedaqi	Heilongjiang	China	JGD	ZYJD	Daxing'anling Oroqen Airport	
Jiamusi	Heilongjiang	China	JMU	ZYJM	Jiamusi Dongjiao Airport	
Jiayuguan	Gansu	China	JGN	ZLJQ	Jiayuguan Airport	
Jinan	Shandong	China	TNA	ZSJN	Jinan Yaoqiang International Airport	
Jinchang	Gansu	China	JIC	ZLJC	Jinchang Jinchuan Airport	
Jingdezhen	Jiangxi	China	JDZ	ZSJD	Jingdezhen Luojia Airport	
Jinghong	Yunnan	China	JHG	ZPJH	Xishuangbanna Gasa Airport	
Jining	Shandong	China	JNG	ZSJG	Jining Qufu Airport	
Jinzhou	Liaoning	China	JNZ	ZYJZ	Jinzhou Bay Airport	
Jiuzhaigou	Sichuan	China	JZH	ZUJZ	Jiuzhai Huanglong Airport	
Jixi	Heilongjiang	China	JXA	ZYJX	Jixi Xingkaihu Airport	
Johannesburg	Gauteng	South Africa	JNB	FAOR	O. R. Tambo International Airport	
Kagoshima	Kyushu	Japan	KOJ	RJFK	Kagoshima Airport	
Kaili	Guizhou	China	KJH	ZUKJ	Kaili Huangping Airport	
Kalibo	Western Visayas	Philippines	KLO	RPVK	Kalibo International Airport	
Kangding	Sichuan	China	KGT	ZUKD	Kangding Airport	
Kaohsiung	Southern Taiwan	Taiwan	KHH	RCKH	Kaohsiung International Airport	
Karamay	Xinjiang	China	KRY	ZWKM	Karamay Airport	
Kashgar	Xinjiang	China	KHG	ZWSH	Kashgar Airport	
Kathmandu	Bagmati Province	Nepal	KTM	VNKT	Tribhuvan International Airport	
Kazan	Tatarstan	Russia	KZN	UWKD	Kazan International Airport	
Kitakyushu	Kyushu	Japan	KKJ	RJFR	Kitakyushu Airport	
Kolkata	West Bengal	India	CCU	VECC	Netaji Subhas Chandra Bose International Airport	
Komatsu	Chūbu	Japan	KMQ	RJNK	Komatsu Airport	
Korla	Xinjiang	China	KRL	ZWKL	Korla Airport	
Krabi	Krabi Province	Thailand	KBV	VTSG	Krabi International Airport	
Kuala Lumpur	Federal Territories	Malaysia	KUL	WMKK	Kuala Lumpur International Airport	
Kunming	Yunnan	China	KMG	ZPPP	Kunming Changshui International Airport	
Kunming	Yunnan	China	~~KMG~~	~~ZPPP~~	Kunming Wujiaba International Airport	
Kuqa	Xinjiang	China	KCA	ZWKC	Kuqa Qiuci Airport	
Lancang	Yunnan	China	JMJ	ZPJM	Lancang Jingmai Airport	
Lanzhou	Gansu	China	LHW	ZLLL	Lanzhou Zhongchuan International Airport	
Laoag	Ilocos Region	Philippines	LAO	RPLI	Laoag International Airport	
Lhasa	Tibet	China	LXA	ZULS	Lhasa Gonggar International Airport	
Lianyungang	Jiangsu	China	LYG	ZSLG	Lianyungang Baitabu Airport	
Linfen	Shanxi	China	LFQ	ZBLF	Linfen Qiaoli Airport	
Lijiang	Yunnan	China	LJG	ZPLJ	Lijiang Sanyi International Airport	
Lincang	Yunnan	China	LNJ	ZPLC	Lincang Airport	
Linyi	Shandong	China	LYI	ZSLY	Linyi Qiyang International Airport	
Liping	Guizhou	China	HZH	ZUNP	Liping Airport	
Lishui	Zhejiang	China	LJI	ZSLI	Lishui Airport	
Liupanshui	Guizhou	China	LPF	ZUPS	Liupanshui Yuezhao Airport	
Liuzhou	Guangxi	China	LZH	ZGZH	Liuzhou Bailian Airport	
Los Angeles	California	United States	LAX	KLAX	Los Angeles International Airport	
London	England	United Kingdom	LGW	EGKK	Gatwick Airport	
London	England	United Kingdom	LHR	EGLL	Heathrow Airport	
Luang Prabang	Luang Prabang Province	Laos	LPQ	VLLB	Luang Prabang International Airport	
Lüliang	Shanxi	China	LLV	ZBLL	Lüliang Dawu Airport	
Luoyang	Henan	China	LYA	ZHLY	Luoyang Beijiao Airport	
Luzhou	Sichuan	China	~~LZO~~	~~ZULZ~~	Luzhou Lantian Airport	
Luzhou	Sichuan	China	LZO	ZULZ	Luzhou Yunlong Airport	
Macau	—	Macau	MFM	VMMC	Macau International Airport	
Madrid	—	Spain	MAD	LEMD	Adolfo Suárez Madrid–Barajas Airport	
Malé	—	Maldives	MLE	VRMM	Velana International Airport	
Manama	—	Bahrain	BAH	OBBI	Bahrain International Airport	
Manzhouli	Inner Mongolia	China	NZH	ZBMZ	Manzhouli Xijiao Airport	
Mandalay	Mandalay Region	Myanmar	MDL	VYMD	Mandalay International Airport	
Mangshi	Yunnan	China	LUM	ZPMS	Dehong Mangshi Airport	
Mangnai	Qinghai	China	HTT	ZLHX	Huatugou Airport	
Manila	Metro Manila	Philippines	MNL	RPLL	Ninoy Aquino International Airport	
Matsuyama	Shikoku	Japan	MYJ	RJOM	Matsuyama Airport	
Mei County	Guangdong	China	MXZ	ZGMX	Meixian Airport	
Melbourne	Victoria	Australia	MEL	YMML	Melbourne Airport	
Mianyang	Sichuan	China	MIG	ZUMY	Mianyang Nanjiao Airport	
Milan	Lombardy	Italy	MXP	LIMC	Milan Malpensa Airport	
Mohe	Heilongjiang	China	OHE	ZYMH	Mohe Gulian Airport	
Moscow	Moscow Federal City / Moscow Oblast	Russia	DME	UUDD	Moscow Domodedovo Airport	
Moscow	Moscow Federal City / Moscow Oblast	Russia	SVO	UUEE	Sheremetyevo International Airport	
Muan	Honam	South Korea	MWX	RKJB	Muan International Airport	
Mudanjiang	Heilongjiang	China	MDG	ZYMD	Mudanjiang Hailang International Airport	
Munich	Bavaria	Germany	MUC	EDDM	Munich Airport	
Mumbai	Maharashtra	India	BOM	VABB	Chhatrapati Shivaji Maharaj International Airport	
Muscat	—	Oman	MCT	OOMS	Muscat International Airport	
Nagasaki	Kyushu	Japan	NGS	RJFU	Nagasaki Airport	
Nagoya	Chūbu	Japan	NGO	RJGG	Chubu Centrair International Airport	
Nanchang	Jiangxi	China	KHN	ZSCN	Nanchang Changbei International Airport	
Nanchong	Sichuan	China	NAO	ZUNC	Nanchong Airport	
Nanjing	Jiangsu	China	NKG	ZSNJ	Nanjing Lukou International Airport	
Nanning	Guangxi	China	NNG	ZGNN	Nanning Wuxu International Airport	
Nantong	Jiangsu	China	NTG	ZSNT	Nantong Xingdong Airport	
Naypyidaw	—	Myanmar	NPT	VVNT	Naypyidaw International Airport	
New York City	New York	United States	JFK	KJFK	John F. Kennedy International Airport	
Ngari	Tibet	China	NGQ	ZUAL	Ngari Gunsa Airport	
Nha Trang	—	Vietnam	CXR	VVCR	Cam Ranh International Airport	
Niigata	Chūbu	Japan	KIJ	RJSN	Niigata Airport	
Ningbo	Zhejiang	China	NGB	ZSNB	Ningbo Lishe International Airport	
Ninglang	Yunnan	China	NLH	ZPNL	Ninglang Luguhu Airport	
Oita	Kyushu	Japan	OIT	RJFO	Oita Airport	
Okayama	Chūgoku	Japan	OKJ	RJOB	Okayama Airport	
Okinawa	Kyushu	Japan	OKA	ROAH	Naha Airport	
Ordos	Inner Mongolia	China	DSN	ZBCF	Ordos Ejin Horo International Airport	
Osaka	Kansai	Japan	KIX	RJBB	Kansai International Airport	
Paris	Île-de-France	France	CDG	LFPG	Charles de Gaulle Airport	
Penang	—	Malaysia	PEN	WMKP	Penang International Airport	
Perth	Western Australia	Australia	PER	YPPH	Perth Airport	
Phnom Penh	—	Cambodia	PNH	VDPP	Phnom Penh International Airport	
Phnom Penh	Kandal Province	Cambodia	KTI	VDTI	Techo International Airport	
Phuket	Phuket Province	Thailand	HKT	VTSP	Phuket International Airport	
Phu Quoc	—	Vietnam	PQC	VVPQ	Phu Quoc International Airport	
Prague	—	Czech Republic	PRG	LKPR	Václav Havel Airport Prague	
Pu'er	Yunnan	China	SYM	ZPSM	Pu'er Simao Airport	
Qianjiang	Chongqing	China	JIQ	ZUQJ	Qianjiang Wulingshan Airport	
Qingdao	Shandong	China	TAO	ZSQD	Qingdao Jiaodong International Airport	
Qingdao	Shandong	China	~~TAO~~	~~ZSQD~~	Qingdao Liuting International Airport	
Qinhuangdao	Hebei	China	BPE	ZBDH	Qinhuangdao Beidaihe Airport	
Qinhuangdao	Hebei	China	~~SHP~~	ZBSH	Qinhuangdao Shanhaiguan Airport	
Qionghai	Hainan	China	BAR	ZJQH	Qionghai Bo'ao Airport	
Qiqihar	Heilongjiang	China	NDG	ZYQQ	Qiqihar Sanjiazi Airport	
Quanzhou	Fujian	China	JJN	ZSQZ	Quanzhou Jinjiang International Airport	
Riyadh	—	Saudi Arabia	RUH	OERK	King Khalid International Airport	
Rizhao	Shandong	China	RIZ	ZSRZ	Rizhao Shanzihe Airport	
Rome	Lazio	Italy	FCO	LIRF	Leonardo da Vinci–Fiumicino Airport	
Saint Petersburg	Saint Petersburg Federal City / Leningrad Oblast	Russia	LED	ULLI	Pulkovo Airport	
Saipan	—	Northern Mariana Islands	SPN	PGSN	Saipan International Airport	
San Francisco	California	United States	SFO	KSFO	San Francisco International Airport	
Sanya	Hainan	China	SYX	ZJSY	Sanya Phoenix International Airport	
Sapporo	Hokkaido	Japan	CTS	RJCC	New Chitose Airport	
Sendai	Tōhoku	Japan	SDJ	RJSS	Sendai Airport	
Seoul	Seoul Capital Area	South Korea	GMP	RKSS	Gimpo International Airport	
Seoul	Seoul Capital Area	South Korea	ICN	RKSI	Incheon International Airport	
Shache	Xinjiang	China	QSZ	ZWSC	Shache Airport	
Shanghai	Shanghai	China	SHA	ZSSS	Shanghai Hongqiao International Airport	
Shanghai	Shanghai	China	PVG	ZSPD	Shanghai Pudong International Airport	
Shangrao	Jiangxi	China	SQD	ZSSR	Shangrao Sanqingshan Airport	
Shantou	Guangdong	China	SWA	ZGOW	Jieyang Chaoshan International Airport	
Shaoyang	Hunan	China	WGN	ZGSY	Shaoyang Wugang Airport	
Shennongjia	Hubei	China	HPG	ZHSN	Shennongjia Hongping Airport	
Shenyang	Liaoning	China	SHE	ZYTX	Shenyang Taoxian International Airport	
Shenzhen	Guangdong	China	SZX	ZGSC	Shenzhen Bao'an International Airport	
Shijiazhuang	Hebei	China	SJW	ZSHC	Shijiazhuang Zhengding International Airport	
Shigatse	Tibet	China	RKZ	ZURK	Shigatse Peace Airport	
Shiyan	Hubei	China	WDS	ZHSY	Shiyan Wudangshan Airport	
Shizuoka	Chūbu	Japan	FSZ	RJNS	Shizuoka Airport	
Siem Reap	-	Cambodia	SAI	VDSA	Siem Reap–Angkor International Airport	
Siem Reap	—	Cambodia	~~REP~~	~~VDSR~~	Siem Reap International Airport	
Singapore	—	Singapore	SIN	WSSS	Changi Airport	
Stockholm	Stockholm Län	Sweden	ARN	ESSA	Stockholm Arlanda Airport	
Surat Thani	Surat Thani Province	Thailand	URT	VTSB	Surat Thani Airport	
Sydney	New South Wales	Australia	SYD	YSSY	Sydney Airport	
Taichung	Central Taiwan	Taiwan	RMQ	RCMQ	Taichung International Airport	
Tainan	Southern Taiwan	Taiwan	TNN	RCNN	Tainan Airport	
Taipei	Northern Taiwan	Taiwan	TSA	RCSS	Songshan Airport	
Taipei	Northern Taiwan	Taiwan	TPE	RCTP	Taoyuan International Airport	
Taiyuan	Shanxi	China	TYN	ZBYN	Taiyuan Wusu International Airport	
Taizhou	Zhejiang	China	HYN	ZSLQ	Taizhou Luqiao Airport	
Tangshan	Hebei	China	TVS	ZBTS	Tangshan Sannühe Airport	
Tashkent	Tashkent	Uzbekistan	TAS	UTTT	Islam Karimov Tashkent International Airport	
Tbilisi; Begins 15 July 2026	Tbilisi	Georgia	TBS	UGTB	Shota Rustaveli Tbilisi International Airport	
Tengchong	Yunnan	China	TCZ	ZUTC	Tengchong Tuofeng Airport	
Tianjin	Tianjin	China	TSN	ZBTJ	Tianjin Binhai International Airport	
Tokyo	Kantō	Japan	HND	RJTT	Haneda Airport	
Tokyo	Kantō	Japan	NRT	RJAA	Narita International Airport	
Tonghua	Jilin	China	TNH	ZYTN	Tonghua Sanyuanpu Airport	
Tongliao	Inner Mongolia	China	TGO	ZBTL	Tongliao Airport	
Tongren	Guizhou	China	TEN	ZUTR	Tongren Fenghuang Airport	
Toronto	Ontario	Canada	YYZ	CYYZ	Toronto Pearson International Airport	
Turpan	Xinjiang	China	TLQ	ZWTP	Turpan Jiaohe Airport	
Ulanhot	Inner Mongolia	China	HLH	ZBUL	Ulanhot Airport	
Urumqi	Xinjiang	China	URC	ZWWW	Ürümqi Diwopu International Airport	
Vancouver	British Columbia	Canada	YVR	CYVR	Vancouver International Airport	
Vientiane	—	Laos	VTE	VLVT	Wattay International Airport	
Weihai	Shandong	China	WEH	ZSWH	Weihai Dashuibo Airport	
Wenshan	Yunnan	China	WNH	ZPWS	Wenshan Puzhehei Airport	
Wenzhou	Zhejiang	China	WNZ	ZSWZ	Wenzhou Longwan International Airport	
Wuhai	Inner Mongolia	China	WUA	ZBUH	Wuhai Airport	
Wuhan	Hubei	China	WUH	ZHHH	Wuhan Tianhe International Airport	
Wuhu	Jiangsu	China	WHA	ZSWA	Wuhu Xuanzhou Airport	
Wuxi	Jiangsu	China	WUX	ZSWX	Sunan Shuofang International Airport	
Wuyishan	Fujian	China	WUS	ZSWY	Nanping Wuyishan Airport	
Xiamen	Fujian	China	XMN	ZSAM	Xiamen Gaoqi International Airport	
Xiangyang	Hubei	China	XFN	ZHXF	Xiangyang Liuji Airport	
Xi'an	Shaanxi	China	XIY	ZLXY	Xi'an Xianyang International Airport	
Xichang	Sichuan	China	XIC	ZUXC	Xichang Qingshan Airport	
Xilinhot	Inner Mongolia	China	XIL	ZBXH	Xilinhot Airport	
Xingyi	Guizhou	China	ACX	ZUYI	Xingyi Wanfenglin Airport	
Xining	Qinghai	China	XNN	ZLXN	Xining Caojiabao International Airport	
Xinyang	Henan	China	XAI	—	Xinyang Minggang Airport	
Xuzhou	Jiangsu	China	XUZ	ZSXZ	Xuzhou Guanyin International Airport	
Yan'an	Shaanxi	China	ENY	ZLYA	Yan'an Ershilipu Airport	
Yancheng	Jiangsu	China	YNZ	ZSYN	Yancheng Nanyang International Airport	
Yangon	Yangon Region	Myanmar	RGN	VYYY	Yangon International Airport	
Yanji	Jilin	China	YNJ	ZYYJ	Yanji Chaoyangchuan International Airport	
Yantai	Shandong	China	~~YNT~~	~~ZSYT~~	Yantai Laishan International Airport	
Yantai	Shandong	China	YNT	ZSYT	Yantai Penglai International Airport	
Yibin	Sichuan	China	YBP	ZUYB	Yibin Wuliangye Airport	
Yichang	Hubei	China	YIH	ZHYC	Yichang Sanxia Airport	
Yichun	Heilongjiang	China	LDS	ZYLD	Yichun Lindu Airport	
Yinchuan	Ningxia	China	INC	ZLIC	Yinchuan Hedong International Airport	
Yining	Xinjiang	China	YIN	ZWYN	Yining Airport	
Yingkou	Liaoning	China	YKH	ZYYK	Yingkou Lanqi Airport	
Yiwu	Zhejiang	China	YIW	ZSYW	Yiwu Airport	
Yongzhou	Hunan	China	LLF	ZGLG	Yongzhou Lingling Airport	
Yulin	Shaanxi	China	UYN	ZLYL	Yulin Yuyang Airport	
Yuncheng	Shanxi	China	YCU	ZBYC	Yuncheng Guangong Airport	
Yushu	Qinghai	China	YUS	ZLYS	Yushu Batang Airport	
Zhangjiajie	Hunan	China	DYG	ZGDY	Zhangjiajie Hehua International Airport	
Zhangjiakou	Hebei	China	ZQZ	ZBZJ	Zhangjiakou Ningyuan Airport	
Zhangye	Gansu	China	YZY	ZLZY	Zhangye Ganzhou Airport	
Zhanjiang	Guangdong	China	~~ZHA~~	~~ZGZJ~~	Zhanjiang Airport	
Zhanjiang	Guangdong	China	ZHA	ZGZJ	Zhanjiang Wuchuan Airport	
Zhaotong	Yunnan	China	ZAT	ZPZT	Zhaotong Airport	
Zhengzhou	Henan	China	CGO	ZHCC	Zhengzhou Xinzheng International Airport	
Zhongdian	Yunnan	China	DIG	ZPDQ	Diqing Shangri-La Airport	
Zhongwei	Ningxia	China	ZHY	ZLZW	Zhongwei Shapotou Airport	
Zhoushan	Zhejiang	China	HSN	ZSZS	Zhoushan Putuoshan Airport	
Zhuhai	Guangdong	China	ZUH	ZGSD	Zhuhai Jinwan Airport	
Zunyi	Guizhou	China	ZYI	ZUZY	Zunyi Xinzhou Airport	
Zürich	Canton of Zürich	Switzerland	ZRH	LSZH	Zürich Airport	
