= Hot and high =

Condition of low air density

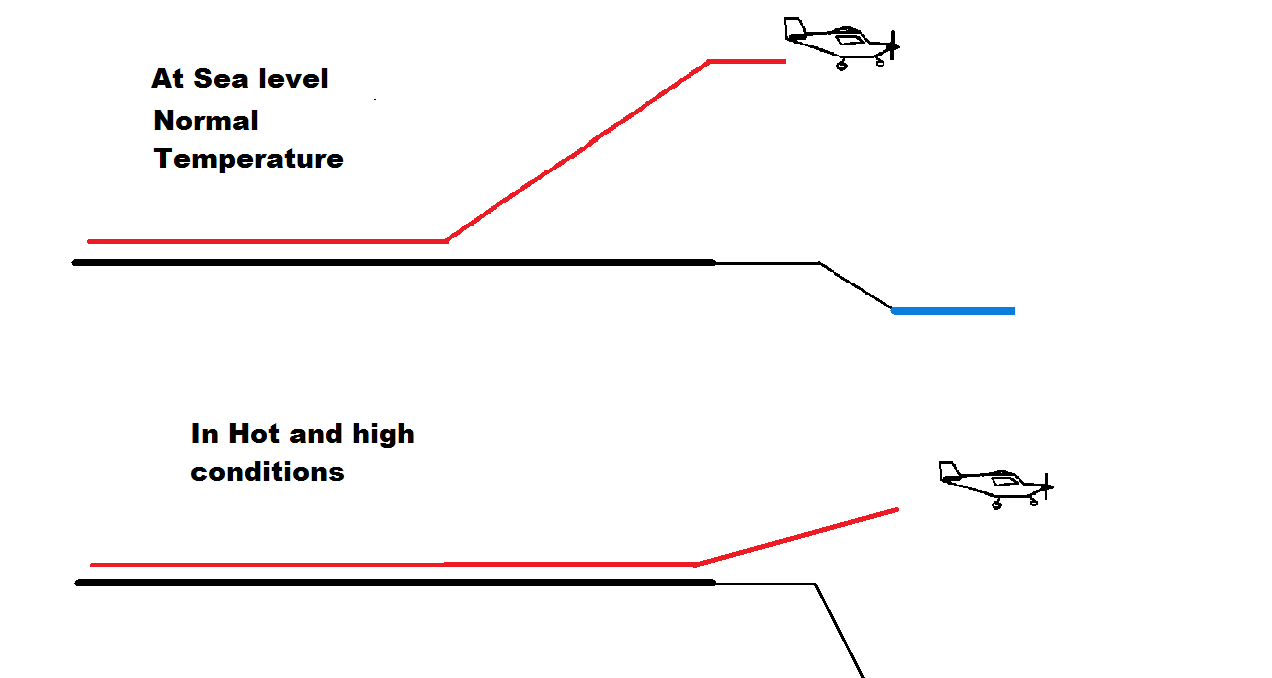

In aviation, hot and high is a condition of low air density due to high ambient temperature and high airport elevation. Air density decreases with increasing temperature and altitude. The lower air density reduces the power output from an aircraft's engine and also requires a higher true airspeed before the aircraft can become airborne. Aviators gauge air density by calculating the density altitude.

An airport may be especially hot or high, without the other condition being present. Temperature and pressure altitude can change from one hour to the next. The fact that temperature generally decreases as altitude increases mitigates the "hot and high" effect to a small extent.

== Negative effects of reduced engine power due to hot and high conditions ==
- Airplanes require a longer takeoff run, potentially exceeding the amount of available runway.
- Reduced take-off power hampers an aircraft's ability to climb. In some cases, an aircraft may be unable to climb rapidly enough to clear terrain surrounding a mountain airport.
- Helicopters may be forced to operate in the shaded portion of the height–velocity diagram in order to become airborne at all. This creates the potential for an uncontrollable descent in the event of an engine failure.
- In some cases, aircraft have landed at high-altitude airports by taking advantage of cold temperatures only to become stranded as temperatures warmed and air density decreased.
- While unsafe at any altitude, an overloaded aircraft is much more dangerous under hot and high conditions.

== Improving hot and high performance ==
Some ways to increase aircraft performance in hot and high conditions include:

- Reduce aircraft weight. Weight can be reduced by carrying only enough fuel to reach the (lower-altitude) destination rather than filling the tanks completely. In some cases, unnecessary equipment can be removed from the aircraft. In many cases, however, the only practical way to adequately reduce aircraft weight is to depart with a smaller passenger, cargo, or weapons load. Consequently, hot and high conditions at the originating airport may prevent a commercial aircraft from operating with a load large enough to be profitable, or may constrain the firepower that a combat aircraft can bring to bear when conducting a long-range airstrike.
- Increase engine power. More powerful engines can improve an airplane's acceleration and reduce its takeoff run. More powerful engines are generally larger and heavier and use more fuel during cruise, however, increasing the fuel load needed to reach the same destination. The added weight of the fuel and engines may negate the potential performance gain, and the added cost of the extra fuel may constrain the profitability of a commercial aircraft. On the other hand, replacing an older, less efficient engine with a newer engine of more advanced design can increase both power output and efficiency while sometimes even decreasing weight. In this situation, the only real disadvantage is the cost of the upgrade.
- Utilize assisted take off devices, such as rockets, to increase acceleration and rate of climb.
- Inject distilled water into the engine compressor or combustor. The primary purpose of water injection into jet engines is to increase the mass being accelerated, thereby increasing the force created by the engine. A secondary purpose is to lower the combustion temperature so that higher power settings may be used without causing engine temperatures to exceed limits.

== Jet- or rocket-assisted take off ==
Auxiliary rockets and/or jet engines can help a fully loaded aircraft to take off within the length of the runway. The rockets are usually one-time units that are jettisoned after takeoff. This practice was common in the 1950s and 60s, when the lower levels of thrust from military turbojets was inadequate for takeoff from shorter runways or with very heavy payloads. It is now seldom used.

Auxiliary jets and rockets have rarely been used on civil aircraft due to the risk of aircraft damage and loss of control if something were to go wrong during their use. Boeing did, however, produce a version of its popular Boeing 727 with JATO primarily for "hot and high" operations out of Mexico City Airport (MMMX) and La Paz, Bolivia. The boosters were located adjacent to the main landing gear at the wing root on each side of the aircraft and only intended to operate as an emergency fallback in the case of an engine failure during takeoff.

== Specialized aircraft ==
Several manufacturers of early jet airliners offered variants optimized for hot and high operations. Such aircraft generally offered the largest wings and/or the most powerful engines in the model lineup coupled with a small fuselage to reduce weight. Some such aircraft include:

- The BAC One-Eleven 475 combined the short body of the series 400 with the more powerful engines and improved wings of the series 500. This aircraft also featured stronger landing gear for rough field operations.
- The Boeing 707-220, which was a 707-120 airframe fitted with more powerful Pratt & Whitney JT4A engines, civilian versions of the military J75. The 707-220 had extremely high fuel consumption, and only 5 were built, all for Braniff International Airways. The 707-220 was rendered redundant by the release of the turbofan-powered 707-120B, which had even greater power along with much lower fuel consumption, which had a side benefit of extending range.
- The Convair 880. Although Convair offered only one configuration of this aircraft, it had more power and a smaller fuselage than its competitors from Boeing and Douglas. Convair essentially wagered the success of the entire 880 model line on the appeal of an aircraft optimized for hot and high operations. The wager failed; only sixty-five 880s were sold and Convair's nascent airliner business soon collapsed.
- The De Havilland Canada Dash 8-200, which is a -100 airframe fitted with larger engines of the -300 for hot and high operations. They proved successful and eventually replaced the -100 production line.
- The Lockheed L-1011-200, which was otherwise an L-1011-100 with more powerful RB.211-524B engines.
- The McDonnell Douglas DC-9-20, which combined the smaller fuselage of the DC-9-10 with the larger wings and more powerful engines of the DC-9-30, and was significantly outsold by both.
- The McDonnell Douglas DC-10-15, which combined the fuselage of the DC-10-10 with the larger engines of the DC-10-30. These were specifically designed for and sold to Aeromexico and Mexicana. Only seven were built.
- The Vickers VC10, which was designed to meet BOAC requirements for a large airliner that could operate medium-range flights from short runways in southern Asia and Africa. The rear-mounted engines gave a more efficient wing and made them less vulnerable to runway debris. The resulting high fuel consumption compared to the contemporary Boeing 707 prompted all other major airlines to dismiss the VC10.
- The McDonnell Douglas MD-82 was a hot and high version of the MD-80, and sold well, which generally is extremely rare for a type of performance-specialised aircraft. It was succeeded by MD-88, which retains some similarities with MD-82 and introduced more advanced features, although it was not promoted as a hot and high jet.

The marketing failure of most of these airplanes demonstrated that airlines were generally unwilling to accept reduced efficiency at cruise and smaller ultimate load-carrying capacity in return for a slight performance gain at particular airports. Rather than accepting these drawbacks, it was easier for airlines to demand the construction of longer runways, operate with smaller loads as conditions dictated, or simply drop the unprofitable destinations.

Furthermore, as the second generation of jet airliners began to appear in the 1970s, some aircraft were designed to eliminate the need for a special "hot and high" variant – for instance, the Airbus A300 can perform a 15/0 takeoff, where the leading edge slats are adjusted to 15 degrees and the flaps kept retracted. This takeoff technique is only used at hot and high airports, for it enables a higher climb limit weight and improves second segment climb performance.

Today, most jetliner manufacturers have dropped the "hot and high" variants from their model lineups. Increased performance and reliability from newer generations of turbofan engines such as the GE90 and CFM56 enable most planes capable of taking off in such conditions.

== Airports ==
Notable examples of hot and high airports include:

- Addis Ababa, Ethiopia – Bole Airport
- Albuquerque, New Mexico, United States – Albuquerque International Sunport, especially from late spring to early autumn
- Brasília, Brazil – Brasília Airport
- Bogotá, Colombia – El Dorado Airport
- Calgary, Alberta, Canada – Calgary International Airport, especially from late spring to early autumn
- Dali City, Yunnan, China – Dali Fengyi Airport; Elevation: 2,149 m (7,050 ft)
- Daocheng County, Sichuan, China – Daocheng Yading Airport; At 4,411 m (14,472 ft) above sea level, Daocheng Yading is the highest civilian airport in the world.
- Daulat Beg Oldi, Ladakh, India – Daulat Beg Oldi Advanced Landing Ground (The world's highest airstrip at 16,700 feet (5,100 m). Climate ranges from a maximum of 35 °C (95 °F) in summer to −35 °C (−31 °F) in winter)
- Denver, Colorado – Denver International Airport, especially from late spring to early autumn
- Edwards Air Force Base, California, United States
- Guatemala City, Guatemala – La Aurora International Airport, the highest international airport in Central America (4,951 feet (1,509 m)). It is hot from late February to late October
- Harare, Zimbabwe – Robert Gabriel Mugabe International Airport
- Jangdam Township in Shigatse, Tibet, China – Shigatse Peace Airport; Elevation: 3,782 m (12,408 ft)
- Johannesburg, South Africa – O. R. Tambo International Airport
- Kabul, Afghanistan – Kabul International Airport
- Kampala, Uganda – Entebbe International Airport
- Kangding, Sichuan, China – Kangding Airport; Elevation: 4,280 m (14,042 ft)
- Kunming, Yunnan, China – Kunming Changshui International Airport
- Kuwait City, Kuwait – Kuwait International Airport (while only at an elevation of 206 feet (63 m), it is widely considered one of the world's hottest airports, as temperatures can reach up to 114 °F (46 °C) on an average summer day)
- La Paz, Bolivia – El Alto International Airport (not generally a "hot" airport, as average high temperatures are never more than 15 °C (59 °F) throughout the year, but the world's highest commercial airport with regularly scheduled international flights at 13,325 feet (4,061 m))
- Las Vegas, Nevada, United States – Harry Reid International Airport
- Leh, Ladakh, India – Kushok Bakula Rimpochee Airport – (One of the highest commercial airports in the world at 10,700 feet (3,300 m). Surrounded by high mountain peaks and with temperatures ranging from −42 °C (-43.6 °F) in winter to 33 °C (91.4 °F) in summer, it is an extremely challenging airport to fly from)
- Lhasa, Tibet, China – Lhasa Gonggar Airport
- Lijiang, Yunnan, China – Lijiang Sanyi International Airport; Elevation: 2,243 m (7,359 ft)
- Lusaka, Zambia – Kenneth Kaunda International Airport
- Medellín, Colombia – José María Córdoba International Airport ( hot and high tests for the Airbus A380 were done there).
- Mexico City, Mexico – Mexico City International Airport, and Felipe Ángeles International Airport
- Nairobi, Kenya – Jomo Kenyatta International Airport
- Gunsa Township in Ngari Prefecture, Tibet, China – Ngari Gunsa Airport; Elevation: 4,274 m (14,022 ft)
- Mainling in Nyingchi, Tibet, China – Nyingchi Mainling Airport; Elevation: 2,949 m (9,675 ft)
- Phoenix, Arizona, United States – Phoenix Sky Harbor International Airport (altitude of 1,135 feet (346 m) is not extreme, but the area's hot desert climate gives it hot and high characteristics for most of the year)
- Qamdo, Tibet, China – Qamdo Bamda Airport; Elevation: 4,334 m (14,219 ft)
- Quito, Ecuador – Mariscal Sucre Airport
- Riyadh, Saudi Arabia – King Khalid International Airport
- Salt Lake City, Utah, United States – Salt Lake City International Airport, especially from late spring to early autumn
- Sanaa, Yemen – Sanaa International Airport
- Siachen Glacier, India – Sonam Post, world's highest helipad (altitude of 21,000 feet (6,400 m) in the world's highest staffed post.
- Shangri-la, Yunnan, China – Diqing Shangri-La Airport; Elevation: 3,280 m (10,761 ft)
- Tehran, Iran – Tehran Imam Khomeini International Airport
- Yerevan, Armenia – Zvartnots International Airport
- Windhoek, Namibia – Hosea Kutako International Airport
