= List of Air China destinations =

This is a list of destinations served currently by Air China, the flag carrier for the People's Republic of China. For freighter destinations, see Air China Cargo. The airline has 203 destinations on six continents.

== Destinations ==
Country (subdivision) or territory	City	Airport	Notes	Refs
Albania	Tirana	Tirana International Airport Nënë Tereza	Terminated	
Australia	Brisbane	Brisbane Airport	Terminated	
Australia	Melbourne	Melbourne Airport		
Australia	Sydney	Sydney Airport		
Austria	Vienna	Vienna International Airport		
Bangladesh	Dhaka	Hazrat Shahjalal International Airport		
Belarus	Minsk	Minsk National Airport		
Belgium	Brussels	Brussels Airport		
Brazil	São Paulo	São Paulo/Guarulhos International Airport		
Cambodia	Phnom Penh	Phnom Penh International Airport	Airport closed	
Cambodia	Phnom Penh	Techo International Airport		
Cambodia	Siem Reap	Siem Reap International Airport	Airport closed	
Canada	Montreal	Montréal–Trudeau International Airport	Resumes 29 March 2027	
Canada	Toronto	Toronto Pearson International Airport		
Canada	Vancouver	Vancouver International Airport		
China (Anhui)	Fuyang	Fuyang Xiguan Airport		
China (Anhui)	Hefei	Hefei Luogang Airport	Airport closed	
China (Anhui)	Hefei	Hefei Xinqiao International Airport		
China (Anhui)	Huangshan	Huangshan Tunxi International Airport		
China (Beijing)	Beijing	Beijing Capital International Airport	Hub	
China (Beijing)	Beijing	Beijing Daxing International Airport	Hub	
China (Chongqing)	Chongqing	Chongqing Jiangbei International Airport	Focus city	
China (Chongqing)	Wanzhou	Wanzhou Wuqiao Airport		
China (Fujian)	Fuzhou	Fuzhou Changle International Airport		
China (Fujian)	Xiamen	Xiamen Gaoqi International Airport		
China (Gansu)	Dunhuang	Dunhuang Mogao International Airport		
China (Gansu)	Lanzhou	Lanzhou Zhongchuan International Airport		
China (Guangdong)	Guangzhou	Guangzhou Baiyun International Airport	Focus city	
China (Guangdong)	Huizhou	Huizhou Pingtan Airport		
China (Guangdong)	Shantou	Jieyang Chaoshan International Airport		
China (Guangdong)	Shenzhen	Shenzhen Bao'an International Airport	Focus city	
China (Guangdong)	Zhanjiang	Zhanjiang Airport	Airport closed	
China (Guangdong)	Zhanjiang	Zhanjiang Wuchuan International Airport		
China (Guangdong)	Zhuhai	Zhuhai Jinwan Airport		
China (Guangxi)	Beihai	Beihai Fucheng Airport		
China (Guangxi)	Guilin	Guilin Liangjiang International Airport		
China (Guangxi)	Liuzhou	Liuzhou Bailian Airport		
China (Guangxi)	Nanning	Nanning Wuxu International Airport		
China (Guizhou)	Guiyang	Guiyang Longdongbao International Airport		
China (Guizhou)	Liupanshui	Liupanshui Yuezhao Airport		
China (Guizhou)	Zunyi	Zunyi Xinzhou Airport		
China (Hainan)	Haikou	Haikou Meilan International Airport		
China (Hainan)	Sanya	Sanya Phoenix International Airport		
China (Heilongjiang)	Daqing	Daqing Sartu Airport		
China (Heilongjiang)	Fuyuan	Fuyuan Dongji Airport		
China (Heilongjiang)	Harbin	Harbin Taiping International Airport		
China (Heilongjiang)	Jiamusi	Jiamusi Dongjiao Airport		
China (Heilongjiang)	Mudanjiang	Mudanjiang Hailang International Airport		
China (Heilongjiang)	Qiqihar	Qiqihar Sanjiazi Airport		
China (Henan)	Zhengzhou	Zhengzhou Xinzheng International Airport		
China (Hubei)	Shiyan	Shiyan Wudangshan Airport		
China (Hubei)	Wuhan	Wuhan Tianhe International Airport	Focus city	
China (Hubei)	Xiangyang	Xiangyang Liuji Airport		
China (Hubei)	Yichang	Yichang Sanxia Airport		
China (Hunan)	Changde	Changde Taohuayuan Airport		
China (Hunan)	Changsha	Changsha Huanghua International Airport		
China (Hunan)	Zhangjiajie	Zhangjiajie Hehua International Airport		
China (Inner Mongolia)	Baotou	Baotou Erliban Airport		
China (Inner Mongolia)	Bayannur	Bayannur Tianjitai Airport		
China (Inner Mongolia)	Chifeng	Chifeng Yulong Airport		
China (Inner Mongolia)	Hohhot	Hohhot Baita International Airport	Focus city	
China (Inner Mongolia)	Hulunbuir	Hulunbuir Hailar Airport		
China (Inner Mongolia)	Manzhouli	Manzhouli Xijiao Airport		
China (Inner Mongolia)	Ordos	Ordos Ejin Horo International Airport		
China (Inner Mongolia)	Tongliao	Tongliao Airport		
China (Inner Mongolia)	Ulanhot	Ulanhot Airport		
China (Inner Mongolia)	Wuhai	Wuhai Airport		
China (Inner Mongolia)	Xilinhot	Xilinhot Airport		
China (Jiangsu)	Changzhou	Changzhou Benniu International Airport		
China (Jiangsu)	Lianyungang	Lianyungang Huaguoshan International Airport		
China (Jiangsu)	Nanjing	Nanjing Lukou International Airport		
China (Jiangsu)	Nantong	Nantong Xingdong International Airport		
China (Jiangsu)	Wuxi	Wuxi Shuofang Airport		
China (Jiangsu)	Xuzhou	Xuzhou Guanyin International Airport		
China (Jiangsu)	Yancheng	Yancheng Nanyang International Airport		
China (Jiangsu)	Yangzhou	Yangzhou Taizhou International Airport		
China (Jiangxi)	Ganzhou	Ganzhou Huangjin Airport		
China (Jiangxi)	Ganzhou	Ganzhou Ruijin Airport		
China (Jiangxi)	Ji'an	Ji'an Jinggangshan Airport		
China (Jiangxi)	Jingdezhen	Jingdezhen Luojia Airport		
China (Jiangxi)	Nanchang	Nanchang Changbei International Airport		
China (Jilin)	Changchun	Changchun Longjia International Airport		
China (Jilin)	Tonghua	Tonghua Sanyuanpu Airport		
China (Jilin)	Yanji	Yanji Chaoyangchuan International Airport		
China (Liaoning)	Chaoyang	Chaoyang Airport		
China (Liaoning)	Dalian	Dalian Zhoushuizi International Airport	Focus city	
China (Liaoning)	Dandong	Dandong Langtou Airport		
China (Liaoning)	Shenyang	Shenyang Taoxian International Airport		
China (Ningxia)	Yinchuan	Yinchuan Hedong International Airport		
China (Qinghai)	Xining	Xining Caojiabao International Airport		
China (Shaanxi)	Xi'an	Xi'an Xianyang International Airport		
China (Shaanxi)	Yulin	Yulin Yuyang Airport		
China (Shandong)	Jinan	Jinan Yaoqiang International Airport		
China (Shandong)	Qingdao	Qingdao Jiaodong International Airport		
China (Shandong)	Qingdao	Qingdao Liuting International Airport	Airport closed	
China (Shandong)	Weihai	Weihai Dashuibo Airport		
China (Shandong)	Yantai	Yantai Laishan Airport		
China (Shandong)	Yantai	Yantai Penglai International Airport		
China (Shanghai)	Shanghai	Shanghai Hongqiao International Airport		
China (Shanghai)	Shanghai	Shanghai Pudong International Airport	Focus city	
China (Shanxi)	Changzhi	Changzhi Wangcun Airport		
China (Shanxi)	Datong	Datong Yungang International Airport		
China (Shanxi)	Taiyuan	Taiyuan Wusu International Airport		
China (Shanxi)	Yuncheng	Yuncheng Yanhu International Airport		
China (Sichuan)	Chengdu	Chengdu Shuangliu International Airport	Hub	
China (Sichuan)	Chengdu	Chengdu Tianfu International Airport	Hub	
China (Sichuan)	Daocheng	Daocheng Yading Airport		
China (Sichuan)	Dazhou	Dazhou Jinya Airport		
China (Sichuan)	Guangyuan	Guangyuan Panlong Airport		
China (Sichuan)	Jiuzhaigou	Jiuzhai Huanglong Airport		
China (Sichuan)	Luzhou	Luzhou Lantian Airport	Airport closed	
China (Sichuan)	Luzhou	Luzhou Yunlong Airport		
China (Sichuan)	Mianyang	Mianyang Nanjiao Airport		
China (Sichuan)	Panzhihua	Panzhihua Baoanying Airport		
China (Sichuan)	Xichang	Xichang Qingshan Airport		
China (Sichuan)	Yibin	Yibin Wuliangye Airport		
China (Tianjin)	Tianjin	Tianjin Binhai International Airport	Focus city	
China (Tibet)	Lhasa	Lhasa Gonggar International Airport		
China (Tibet)	Nyingchi	Nyingchi Mainling Airport		
China (Tibet)	Qamdo	Qamdo Bamda Airport		
China (Tibet)	Shigatse	Shigatse Peace Airport		
China (Tibet)	Shiquanhe	Ngari Gunsa Airport		
China (Xinjiang)	Aksu	Aksu Hongqipo Airport		
China (Xinjiang)	Altay	Altay Xuedu Airport		
China (Xinjiang)	Hami	Hami Yizhou Airport		
China (Xinjiang)	Hotan	Hotan Kungang Airport		
China (Xinjiang)	Karamay	Karamay Guhai Airport		
China (Xinjiang)	Kashgar	Kashgar Laining International Airport		
China (Xinjiang)	Korla	Korla Licheng Airport		
China (Xinjiang)	Turpan	Turpan Jiaohe Airport		
China (Xinjiang)	Ürümqi	Ürümqi Tianshan International Airport		
China (Yunnan)	Jinghong	Xishuangbanna Gasa International Airport		
China (Yunnan)	Kunming	Kunming Changshui International Airport	Focus city	
China (Yunnan)	Kunming	Kunming Wujiaba International Airport	Airport closed	
China (Yunnan)	Lijiang	Lijiang Sanyi International Airport		
China (Zhejiang)	Hangzhou	Hangzhou Xiaoshan International Airport	Focus city	
China (Zhejiang)	Lishui	Lishui Airport		
China (Zhejiang)	Ningbo	Ningbo Lishe International Airport		
China (Zhejiang)	Taizhou	Taizhou Luqiao Airport		
China (Zhejiang)	Wenzhou	Wenzhou Longwan International Airport		
China (Zhejiang)	Yiwu	Yiwu Airport		
Croatia	Zagreb	Zagreb Airport		
Cuba	Havana	José Martí International Airport		
Denmark	Copenhagen	Copenhagen Airport		
Egypt	Cairo	Cairo International Airport		
Ethiopia	Addis Ababa	Addis Ababa Bole International Airport	Terminated	
France	Nice	Nice Côte d'Azur Airport	Terminated	
France	Paris	Charles de Gaulle Airport		
Georgia	Tbilisi	Tbilisi International Airport		
Germany	Berlin	Berlin Tegel Airport	Airport closed	
Germany	Düsseldorf	Düsseldorf Airport		
Germany	Frankfurt	Frankfurt Airport		
Germany	Munich	Munich Airport		
Greece	Athens	Athens International Airport		
Hong Kong	Hong Kong	Hong Kong International Airport		
Hong Kong	Hong Kong	Kai Tak Airport	Airport closed	
Hungary	Budapest	Budapest Ferenc Liszt International Airport		
Iceland	Reykjavík	Keflavík Airport		
India	Bengaluru	Kempegowda International Airport	Terminated	
India	New Delhi	Indira Gandhi International Airport		
Indonesia	Jakarta	Soekarno–Hatta International Airport		
Iran	Tehran	Mehrabad International Airport	Terminated	
Iraq	Baghdad	Baghdad International Airport	Terminated	
Italy	Milan	Milan Malpensa Airport		
Italy	Rome	Rome Fiumicino Airport		
Japan	Fukuoka	Fukuoka Airport		
Japan	Hakodate	Hakodate Airport		
Japan	Hiroshima	Hiroshima Airport		
Japan	Ibaraki	Ibaraki Airport	Terminated	
Japan	Nagasaki	Nagasaki Airport	Terminated	
Japan	Nagoya	Chubu Centrair International Airport		
Japan	Nagoya	Nagoya Komaki Airport	Terminated	
Japan	Naha	Naha Airport		
Japan	Osaka	Kansai International Airport		
Japan	Sapporo	New Chitose Airport		
Japan	Sendai	Sendai Airport		
Japan	Shizuoka	Shizuoka Airport		
Japan	Tokyo	Haneda Airport		
Japan	Tokyo	Narita International Airport		
Kazakhstan	Almaty	Almaty International Airport		
Kazakhstan	Astana	Nursultan Nazarbayev International Airport		
Kyrgyzstan	Bishkek	Manas International Airport		
Kuwait	Kuwait City	Kuwait International Airport	Terminated	
Macau	Macau	Macau International Airport		
Malaysia	Kuala Lumpur	Kuala Lumpur International Airport		
Mongolia	Ulaanbaatar	Buyant-Ukhaa International Airport	Airport closed	
Mongolia	Ulaanbaatar	Chinggis Khaan International Airport		
Myanmar	Mandalay	Mandalay International Airport	Terminated	
Myanmar	Yangon	Yangon International Airport		
Nepal	Kathmandu	Tribhuvan International Airport		
New Zealand	Auckland	Auckland Airport		
North Korea	Pyongyang	Pyongyang International Airport		
Pakistan	Islamabad	Benazir Bhutto International Airport	Airport closed	
Pakistan	Islamabad	Islamabad International Airport		
Pakistan	Karachi	Jinnah International Airport		
Panama	Panama City	Tocumen International Airport	Terminated	
Peru	Lima	Jorge Chávez International Airport	Terminated	
Philippines	Manila	Ninoy Aquino International Airport		
Poland	Warsaw	Warsaw Chopin Airport		
Romania	Bucharest	Bucharest Henri Coandă International Airport		
Russia	Chita	Kadala Airport		
Russia	Irkutsk	International Airport Irkutsk		
Russia	Moscow	Sheremetyevo International Airport		
Russia	Omsk	Omsk Tsentralny Airport	Terminated	
Russia	Saint Petersburg	Pulkovo Airport	Terminated	
Russia	Vladivostok	Vladivostok International Airport		
Russia	Yekaterinburg	Koltsovo International Airport		
Saudi Arabia	Jeddah	King Abdulaziz International Airport	Seasonal	
Saudi Arabia	Medina	Prince Mohammad bin Abdulaziz International Airport	Seasonal	
Saudi Arabia	Riyadh	King Khalid International Airport		
Serbia	Belgrade	Belgrade Nikola Tesla Airport	Terminated	
Singapore	Singapore	Changi Airport		
South Africa	Johannesburg	O. R. Tambo International Airport		
South Korea	Busan	Gimhae International Airport		
South Korea	Daegu	Daegu International Airport	Terminated	
South Korea	Jeju	Jeju International Airport		
South Korea	Seoul	Gimpo International Airport		
South Korea	Seoul	Incheon International Airport		
Spain	Barcelona	Josep Tarradellas Barcelona–El Prat Airport		
Spain	Madrid	Madrid–Barajas Airport		
Sri Lanka	Colombo	Bandaranaike International Airport		
Sweden	Stockholm	Stockholm Arlanda Airport		
Switzerland	Geneva	Geneva Airport		
Switzerland	Zurich	Zurich Airport	Terminated	
Taiwan	Taichung	Taichung International Airport	Terminated	
Taiwan	Taipei	Songshan Airport		
Taiwan	Taipei	Taoyuan International Airport		
Thailand	Bangkok	Don Mueang International Airport	Terminated	
Thailand	Samut Prakan	Suvarnabhumi Airport		
Thailand	Chiang Mai	Chiang Mai International Airport		
Thailand	Phuket	Phuket International Airport		
Thailand	Surat Thani	Surat Thani International Airport	Terminated	
Turkey	Istanbul	Atatürk Airport	Airport closed	
Turkey	Istanbul	Istanbul Airport		
United Arab Emirates	Dubai	Dubai International Airport		
United Arab Emirates	Sharjah	Sharjah International Airport		
United Kingdom	London	Gatwick Airport		
United Kingdom	London	Heathrow Airport		
United States	Honolulu	Daniel K. Inouye International Airport	Terminated	
United States	Houston	George Bush Intercontinental Airport	Terminated	
United States	Los Angeles	Los Angeles International Airport		
United States	New York City	John F. Kennedy International Airport		
United States	Newark	Newark Liberty International Airport	Terminated	
United States	San Francisco	San Francisco International Airport		
United States	San Jose	San Jose International Airport	Terminated	
United States	Washington, D.C.	Dulles International Airport		
Uzbekistan	Tashkent	Tashkent International Airport		
Vietnam	Hanoi	Noi Bai International Airport		
Vietnam	Ho Chi Minh City	Tan Son Nhat International Airport		
Vietnam	Nha Trang	Cam Ranh International Airport		
