= Ngari Airport =

Ngari Airport may refers to:

- Ngari Gunsa Airport (Ali Kunsha Airport), opened in 2010.
- Ngari Burang Airport (Ali Pulan Airport), opened in 2023.
