= Ali Airport =

Ali Airport may refer to:

- Ali Kunsha Airport, Gar Chongsar, Günsa Township, Ngari Prefecture, Tibet
- Ali Pulan Airport, Burang County, Ngari Prefecture, Tibet Autonomous Region
- Abu Ali Airport, Abu Ali Island, Saudi Arabia
- Khan Jahan Ali Airport, Bagerhat, Bangladesh
- Louisville Muhammad Ali International Airport, Louisville, Kentucky, US
