= Garze Gesar Airport =

Airport in Sichuan, China

Garze Gesar Airport 甘孜格萨尔机场
- IATA: GZG; ICAO: ZUGZ

Summary
- Airport type: Public
- Serves: Garzê County, Sichuan, China
- Opened: 16 September 2019; 6 years ago
- Elevation AMSL: 4,068 m / 13,346 ft
- Coordinates: 31°45′27″N 099°33′15″E

Map
- Location of airport in Sichuan

Runways
Direction	Length		Surface
Direction	m	ft	Surface
12/30	4,000	13,123

Statistics (2021)
- Passengers: 80,788
- Aircraft movements: 1,718
- Cargo (metric tons): 6.6

Garze Gesar Airport
- Simplified Chinese: 甘孜格萨尔机场
- Traditional Chinese: 甘孜格薩爾機場
Transcriptions
Standard Mandarin
- Hanyu Pinyin: Gānzī Gésàěr Jīchǎng

Ganzi Gesaer Airport (IATA: GZG, ICAO: ZUGZ) is an airport in Garzê Tibetan Autonomous Prefecture, Sichuan, China. It is located at the border of Laima Town (来马镇) of Garzê County and Cuo'a Town (错阿镇) of Dêgê County, about 52 kilometres (32 mi) from Garzê Town and 152 kilometres (94 mi) from the seat of Dege.

The airport project received approval from the National Development and Reform Commission in October 2015, with a projected investment of 2.26 billion yuan. Construction began in June 2017, and the airport opened on 16 September 2019.

With an elevation of 4,068 metres (13,346 ft), Garze Airport is the fifth airport in China that is above 4,000 meters. It is the third airport in Garze Prefecture, after Kangding Airport and Daocheng Yading Airport.

The airport has a 4,000-meter-long runway (class 4C). It is designed to handle 150,000 passengers per year.

== Airlines and destinations ==
Airlines	Destinations
Sichuan Airlines	Chengdu–Tianfu

== See also ==
- List of airports in China
- List of the busiest airports in China
- List of highest airports
