= Shannan Longzi Airport =

Airport in Shannan, Tibet, China

Shannan Longzi Airport 山南隆子机场
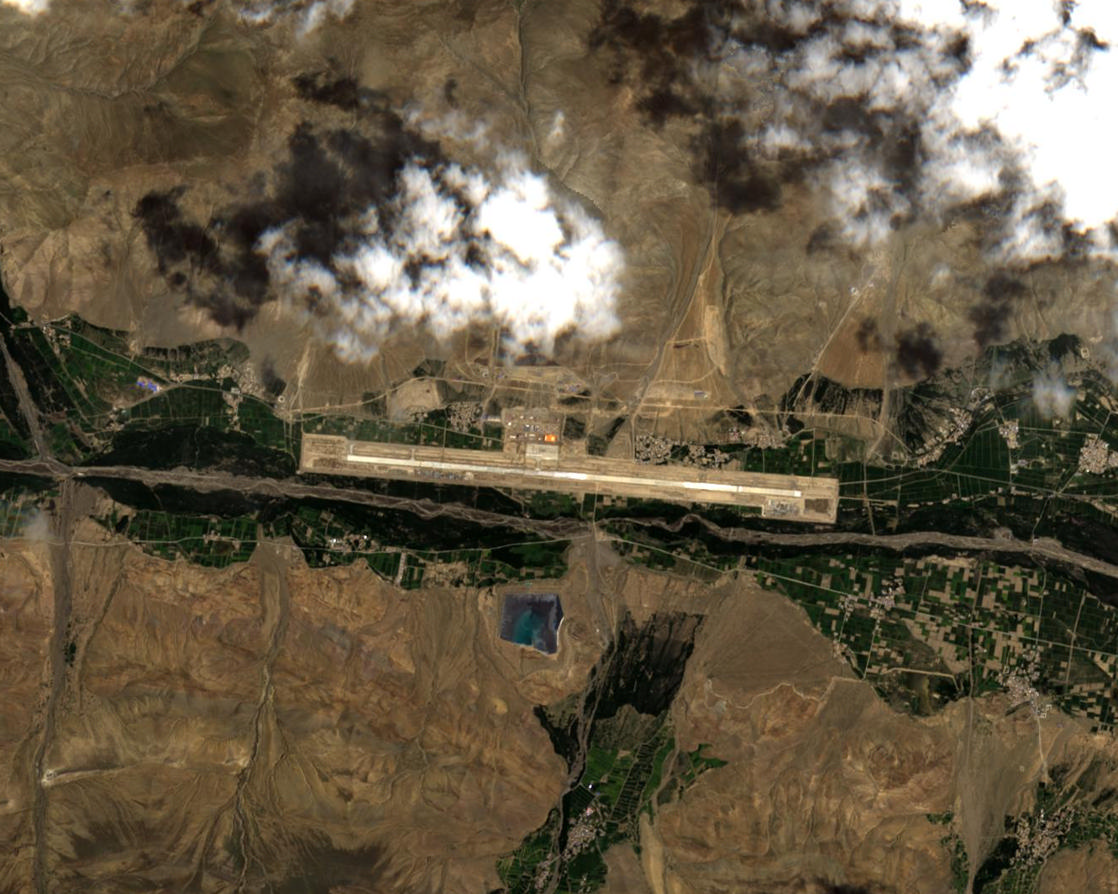
- IATA: LGZ; ICAO: ZUSH

Summary
- Serves: Shannan, Tibet
- Location: Longzi County
- Elevation AMSL: 13,058 ft / 3,980 m
- Coordinates: 28°25′21″N 92°20′40″E

Map
- Location of airport in Tibet

Runways
| Direction | Length | | Surface |
| Direction | m | ft | Surface |
|---|---|---|---|
| 10/28 | 4,500 | 14,764 | Concrete |

Shannan Longzi Airport
- Simplified Chinese: 山南隆子机场
- Traditional Chinese: 山南隆子機場
Transcriptions
Standard Mandarin
- Hanyu Pinyin: Shānnán Lóngzi Jīchǎng

Shannan Longzi Airport (IATA: LGZ, ICAO: ZUSH) is a dual-use military and civilian airport in Shannan, Tibet and is located at an elevation of 3,980 metres (13,060 ft). It is around 11 kilometres (6.8 mi) from the seat of Longzi County in Shannan City, Tibet Autonomous Region, and is about 45 kilometres (28 mi) from the disputed border of Arunachal Pradesh. The airport is designed to have a 4,500 metres (14,800 ft) long (Class 4C) runway with 7 parking stands and is expected to handle 180,000 passengers per year by 2030. Shannan Airport handled its first flight on 12 January 2023.

Shannan Airport was first proposed in conjunction with the development of Ali Pulan Airport and Rikaze Dingri Airport, with the site being approved in 2019. The project was approved by the National Development and Reform Commission and construction was started in April 2021.

== See also ==
- List of airports in China
- List of the busiest airports in China
- List of highest airports
