= List of longest runways =

== List of airports with a paved runway at least 4,000 metres (13,000 ft) long ==
Airport name	Country	Continent	Coordinates	Length	
Airport name	Country	Continent	Coordinates	(m)	(ft)
Shigatse Peace Airport	China	Asia	29°21′06″N 89°18′25″E	5,000	16,404
Ulyanovsk Vostochny Airport	Russia	Europe	54°24′04″N 048°48′10″E	5,000	16,404
Embraer Unidade Gavião Peixoto Airport	Brazil	South America	21°46′25″S 048°24′18″W	4,967	16,296
Upington Airport	South Africa	Africa	28°24′04″S 021°15′35″E	4,900	16,076
Denver International Airport	United States	North America	39°51′42″N 104°40′23″W	4,877	16,001
Hamad International Airport	Qatar	Asia	25°16′23″N 051°36′29″E	4,850	15,912
Madrid-Torrejón Airport	Spain	Europe	40°29′48″N 003°26′45″W	4,818	15,807
Erbil International Airport	Iraq	Asia	36°14′15″N 043°57′47″E	4,800	15,748
Robert Gabriel Mugabe International Airport	Zimbabwe	Africa	17°55′54″S 031°05′34″E	4,725	15,502
N'djili Airport	DR of the Congo	Africa	04°23′08″S 015°26′40″E	4,700	15,420
Zhukovsky International Airport	Russia	Europe	55°33′12″N 038°09′06″E	4,602	15,098
Hwange National Park Airport	Zimbabwe	Africa	18°37′48″S 027°01′16″E	4,600	15,092
Southern California Logistics Airport	United States	North America	34°35′51″N 117°22′59″W	4,587	15,049
Edwards Air Force Base^{,} ^{A}	United States	North America	34°54′20″N 117°53′01″W	4,579	15,023
Doha International Airport	Qatar	Asia	25°15′40″N 051°33′54″E	4,572	15,000
Shuttle Landing Facility	United States	North America	28°36′54″N 080°41′40″W	4,572	15,000
Vandenberg Space Force Base	United States	North America	34°43′46″N 120°34′36″W	4,572	15,000
Windhoek Hosea Kutako International Airport	Namibia	Africa	22°29′12″S 017°27′45″E	4,532	14,869
Harry Reid International Airport	United States	North America	36°04′48″N 115°09′08″W	4,522	14,836
Al Maktoum International Airport	United Arab Emirates	Asia	24°53′10″N 055°10′20″E	4,502	14,770
Almaty International Airport	Kazakhstan	Asia	43°21′07″N 077°02′26″E	4,500	14,764
Felipe Ángeles International Airport	Mexico	North America	19°45′24″N 099°00′55″W	4,500	14,764
Kunming Changshui International Airport	China	Asia	25°05′39″N 102°56′04″E	4,500	14,764
Mafikeng Airport	South Africa	Africa	25°48′27″S 025°32′40″E	4,500	14,764
Ngari Gunsa Airport	China	Asia	32°06′31″N 80°03′10″E	4,500	14,764
Qamdo Bamda Airport	China	Asia	30°33′13″N 097°06′31″E	4,500	14,764
Yubileyniy Airport	Kazakhstan	Asia	46°03′07″N 063°14′50″E	4,500	14,764
Bushehr Airport	Iran	Asia	28°56′41″N 050°50′04″E	4,470	14,665
Madrid-Barajas Airport	Spain	Europe	40°29′03″N 003°34′00″W	4,470	14,665
Dubai International Airport	United Arab Emirates	Asia	25°15′10″N 055°21′52″E	4,447	14,590
Indira Gandhi International Airport	India	Asia	28°33′59″N 077°06′11″E	4,430	14,534
Eielson Air Force Base	United States	North America	64°39′56″N 147°06′05″W	4,429	14,531
John F. Kennedy International Airport	United States	North America	40°38′23″N 073°46′44″W	4,423	14,511
O.R. Tambo International Airport	South Africa	Africa	26°08′21″S 028°14′46″E	4,418	14,495
Isfahan International Airport	Iran	Asia	32°45′03″N 051°51′40″E	4,397	14,426
Shiraz International Airport	Iran	Asia	29°32′21″N 052°35′24″E	4,372	14,344
Hamedan Air Base	Iran	Asia	35°12′42″N 048°39′12″E	4,359	14,301
Lic. Adolfo López Mateos International Airport	Mexico	North America	19°20′27″N 99°34′01″W	4,310	14,140
Naval Air Station Fallon	United States	North America	39°24′59″N 118°42′04″W	4,269	14,006
Mandalay International Airport	Myanmar	Asia	21°42′08″N 095°58′41″E	4,268	14,003
Calgary International Airport	Canada	North America	51°06′50″N 114°01′13″W	4,267	13,999
Zahedan Airport	Iran	Asia	29°29′32″N 060°54′22″E	4,265	13,993
Hyderabad-Rajiv Gandhi International Airport	India	Asia	17°15′00″N 078°25′00″E	4,260	13,976
Fairchild Air Force Base	United States	North America	47°36′54″N 117°39′20″W	4,236	13,898
Dayrestan Airport	Iran	Asia	36°45′16″N 055°54′08″E	4,226	13,865
Paris-Charles de Gaulle Airport	France	Europe	49°00′46″N 002°33′00″E	4,215	13,829
King Khalid International Airport	Saudi Arabia	Asia	24°57′28″N 046°41′56″E	4,205	13,796
Kirtland Air Force Base/Albuquerque International Sunport	United States	North America	35°02′25″N 106°36′33″W	4,204	13,793
Bengaluru International Airport	India	Asia	12°57′04″N 077°40′05″E	4,200	13,780
Daocheng Yading Airport	China	Asia	29°18′46″N 100°03′32″E	4,200	13,780
Manas International Airport	Kyrgyzstan	Asia	43°03′41″N 074°28′39″E	4,200	13,780
Inca Manco Cápac International Airport	Peru	South America	15°28′01″S 070°09′29″W	4,199	13,776
Tehran Imam Khomeini International Airport	Iran	Asia	35°24′58″N 051°09′08″E	4,198	13,773
Al Jufra Air Base	Libya	Africa	29°11′53″N 016°00′04″E	4,185	13,730
Ben Guerir Air Base	Morocco	Africa	32°07′50″N 007°54′39″W	4,182	13,720
Davis–Monthan Air Force Base	United States	North America	32°09′59″N 110°52′59″W	4,158	13,642
Berbera Airport	Somaliland	Africa	10°23′21″N 044°56′27″E	4,140	13,583
Biggs Army Airfield	United States	North America	31°50′58″N 106°22′48″W	4,131	13,553
Kuala Lumpur International Airport	Malaysia	Asia	02°44′44″N 101°42′35″E	4,124	13,530
Zhuhai Jinwan Airport	China	Asia	22°00′25″N 113°22′34″E	4,120	13,517
Hill Air Force Base	United States	North America	41°07′26″N 111°58′22″W	4,117	13,507
Jomo Kenyatta International Airport	Kenya	Africa	01°19′09″S 036°55′40″E	4,117	13,507
Mountain Home Air Force Base	United States	North America	43°02′58″N 115°51′59″W	4,117	13,507
Clinton-Sherman Industrial Airpark	United States	North America	35°20′23″N 099°12′02″W	4,116	13,504
Grant County International Airport	United States	North America	47°12′28″N 119°19′13″W	4,116	13,504
Dyess Air Force Base	United States	North America	32°25′15″N 099°51′17″W	4,115	13,501
Naval Air Station Lemoore	United States	North America	36°19′59″N 119°57′07″W	4,115	13,501
Omidiyeh Air Base	Iran	Asia	30°50′07″N 049°32′06″E	4,115	13,501
Colorado Springs Airport	United States	North America	38°48′21″N 104°42′03″W	4,115	13,501
Rick Husband Amarillo International Airport	United States	North America	35°13′10″N 101°42′21″W	4,115	13,501
Glasgow Industrial Airport	United States	North America	48°25′16″N 106°31′40″W	4,115	13,500
Ellsworth Air Force Base	United States	North America	44°08′42″N 103°06′13″W	4,114	13,497
Arakkonam Naval Air Station	India	Asia	13°04′16″N 079°41′28″E	4,103	13,461
Zayed International Airport	United Arab Emirates	Asia	24°25′59″N 054°39′04″E	4,100	13,451
Istanbul Airport	Turkey	Europe	41°16′31″N 028°45′07″E	4,100	13,451
Mariscal Sucre International Airport	Ecuador	South America	00°07′45″S 078°21′27″W	4,098	13,445
Shahid Sadooghi Airport	Iran	Asia	31°54′18″N 054°16′35″E	4,098	13,445
Altus Air Force Base	United States	North America	34°40′01″N 099°16′00″W	4,097	13,442
Dallas/Fort Worth International Airport	United States	North America	32°53′49″N 097°02′17″W	4,085	13,402
Muscat International Airport	Oman	Asia	23°36′04″N 058°17′18″E	4,080	13,386
Ben Gurion Airport	Israel	Asia	32°00′34″N 034°52′58″E	4,062	13,327
Sharjah International Airport	United Arab Emirates	Asia	25°19′43″N 055°31′02″E	4,060	13,320
March Joint Air Reserve Base	United States	North America	33°52′50″N 117°15′34″W	4,054	13,301
Yuma International Airport	United States	North America	32°39′24″N 114°36′22″W	4,054	13,301
Riyadh Air Base	Saudi Arabia	Asia	24°42′35″N 046°43′31″E	4,050	13,287
Hang Nadim Airport	Indonesia	Asia	01°07′15″N 104°07′07″E	4,040	13,255
Mehrabad Airport	Iran	Asia	35°41′21″N 051°18′49″E	4,038	13,248
Minot Air Force Base	United States	North America	48°24′56″N 101°21′28″W	4,022	13,196
AFB Makhado	South Africa	Africa	23°09′36″S 029°41′48″E	4,020	13,189
Al Taqaddum	Iraq	Asia	33°20′17″N 043°35′49″E	4,019	13,186
Thumamah Airport	Saudi Arabia	Asia	25°12′46″N 046°38′27″E	4,014	13,169
Prince Mohammad Bin Abdulaziz Airport	Saudi Arabia	Asia	24°33′12″N 039°42′18″E	4,008	13,150
Prince Sultan Air Base	Saudi Arabia	Asia	24°03′46″N 047°34′50″E	4,006	13,143
Al Ain International Airport	United Arab Emirates	Asia	24°15′42″N 055°36′33″E	4,005	13,140
Baghdad International Airport	Iraq	Asia	33°15′45″N 044°14′04″E	4,002	13,130
Luxembourg Airport	Luxembourg	Europe	49°37′24″N 006°12′16″E	4,002	13,130
Al Asad Airbase	Iraq	Asia	33°47′08″N 042°26′28″E	4,000	13,123
Antonio Maceo Airport	Cuba	North America	19°58′11″N 075°50′07″W	4,000	13,123
Athens International Airport	Greece	Europe	37°56′11″N 023°56′40″E	4,000	13,123
Basra International Airport	Iraq	Asia	30°32′56″N 047°39′43″E	4,000	13,123
Boryspil International Airport	Ukraine	Europe	50°20′41″N 030°53′36″E	4,000	13,123
Cairo International Airport	Egypt	Africa	30°07′19″N 031°24′20″E	4,000	13,123
Chimore Airport	Bolivia	South America	16°59′20″S 065°08′30″W	4,000	13,123
Ciudad Real Central Airport	Spain	Europe	38°51′23″N 003°58′12″W	4,000	13,123
Don Miguel Hidalgo y Costilla International Airport	Mexico	North America	20°31′18″N 103°18′40″W	4,000	13,123
Donetsk International Airport	Ukraine	Europe	48°04′30″N 37°44′32″E	4,000	13,123
El Alto International Airport	Bolivia	South America	16°30′48″S 068°11′32″W	4,000	13,123
Frankfurt Airport	Germany	Europe	50°01′35″N 008°32′35″E	4,000	13,123
Hurghada International Airport	Egypt	Africa	27°10′42″N 033°47′58″E	4,000	13,123
Incheon International Airport	South Korea	Asia	37°27′48″N 126°26′24″E	4,000	13,123
José Martí International Airport	Cuba	North America	22°59′20″N 082°24′32″W	4,000	13,123
Kansai International Airport	Japan	Asia	34°25′44″N 135°14′26″E	4,000	13,123
Khabarovsk Novy Airport	Russia	Asia	48°31′41″N 135°11′18″E	4,000	13,123
King Abdulaziz International Airport	Saudi Arabia	Asia	26°28′16″N 049°47′52″E	4,000	13,123
King Fahd International Airport	Saudi Arabia	Asia	21°40′46″N 039°09′24″E	4,000	13,123
Lyon-Saint Exupéry Airport	France	Europe	45°43′35″N 005°05′27″E	4,000	13,123
Munich Airport	Germany	Europe	48°21′14″N 011°47′10″E	4,000	13,123
Narita International Airport	Japan	Asia	35°45′53″N 140°23′11″E	4,000	13,123
Rio de Janeiro-Galeão International Airport	Brazil	South America	22°48′32″S 043°14′37″W	4,000	13,123
Shanghai Pudong International Airport	China	Asia	31°08′36″N 121°48′19″E	4,000	13,123
Singapore Changi Airport	Singapore	Asia	01°21′01″N 103°59′40″E	4,000	13,123
Sir Seretse Khama International Airport	Botswana	Africa	24°32′21″S 25°55′08″E	4,000	13,123
Suvarnabhumi Airport	Thailand	Asia	13°40′52″N 100°44′50″E	4,000	13,123
Tashkent International Airport	Uzbekistan	Asia	41°15′28″N 069°16′52″E	4,000	13,123
Victoria Falls Airport	Zimbabwe	Africa	18°05′45″S 025°50′20″E	4,000	13,123

Notes

- ^A The runway also has a 9,000 ft (2,700 m) unpaved overrun on Rogers Dry Lake giving a total length of 24,024 ft (7,323 m)

== Other notable runways ==
Airport name	Country	Coordinates	Length	
Airport name	Country	Coordinates	(m)	(ft)
White Sands Space Harbor^{,} ^{B}	United States	32°56′36″N 106°25′10″W	10,668	35,000
Edwards Air Force Base^{C}	United States	34°56′35″N 117°51′43″W	8,988	29,488
Area 51/Groom Lake^{D}	United States	37°14′06″N 115°48′40″W	7,093	23,271
Edwards Air Force Base^{C}	United States	34°50′40″N 117°51′11″W	7,041	23,100
Edwards Air Force Base^{C}	United States	34°56′43″N 117°52′03″W	7,037	23,087
Edwards Air Force Base^{C}	United States	34°57′26″N 117°50′34″W	6,759	22,175
Edwards Air Force Base^{E}	United States	34°49′56″N 118°03′56″W	6,437	21,119
Edwards Air Force Base^{E}	United States	34°49′56″N 118°03′56″W	6,437	21,119
Qamdo Bamda Airport^{F}	China	30°33′13″N 097°06′31″E	5,500	18,045
Istres-Le Tubé Air Base	France	43°31′22″N 4°55′25″E	5,000	16,404
Edwards Air Force Base^{,} ^{C}	United States	34°55′50″N 117°50′16″W	4,579	15,023
Edwards Air Force Base^{C}	United States	34°57′22″N 117°50′35″W	4,572	15,000

Notes

- ^B Unpaved runway part of the White Sands Test Facility/White Sands Missile Range
- ^C Unpaved runway located on Rogers Dry Lake and not marked on the Federal Aviation Administration airport diagram.
- ^D Paved runway 14R/32L, closed (length approximate)
- ^E Unpaved runway located on Rosamond Lake and not marked on the Federal Aviation Administration airport diagram.
- ^F Paved runway 14/32, closed (new 4,500 m (14,800 ft) runway constructed)

== See also ==
- Aviation
- Density altitude
- List of shortest runways
- List of airports with most runways
