= List of highest airports =

This is a list of the world's highest civilian airports, situated at a minimum elevation of 2,500 m (8,202 ft) above mean sea level.

Airport name	City or region served	Country	IATA code	ICAO code	Coordinates	Elevation (m)	Elevation (ft)	Passengers
Daocheng Yading Airport	Daocheng, Sichuan	China	DCY	ZUDC	29°18′46″N 100°03′32″E	4,411	14,472	155,474
Qamdo Bamda Airport	Qamdo, Tibet	China	BPX	ZUBD	30°33′13″N 97°06′31″E	4,334	14,219	402,165
Shigatse Tingri Airport	Shigatse, Tibet	China	DDR	ZUDR	28°36′16″N 86°47′59″E	4,317	14,163	
Garze Kangding Airport	Kangding, Sichuan	China	KGT	ZUKD	30°09′27″N 101°44′05″E	4,280	14,042	25,417
Ngari Gunsa Airport	Gar, Tibet	China	NGQ	ZUAL	32°06′31″N 80°03′10″E	4,274	14,022	190,056
Ngari Burang Airport	Burang, Tibet	China	APJ	ZUPL	30°23′51″N 81°08′19″E	4,250	13,944	
Vicco Airport	Vicco	Peru	none	SPVI	10°50′40″S 76°14′50″W	4,103	13,461	
Garze Gesar Airport	Garzê, Sichuan	China	GZG	ZUGZ	31°45′18″N 99°33′13″E	4,068	13,346	80,788
El Alto International Airport	La Paz	Bolivia	LPB	SLLP	16°30′48″S 68°11′32″W	4,061	13,323	1,793,668
Shannan Longzi Airport	Shannan, Tibet	China	LGZ	ZUSH	28°25′21″N 92°20′41″E	3,950	12,959	
Captain Nicolas Rojas Airport	Potosí	Bolivia	POI	SLPO	19°32′35″S 65°43′25″W	3,936	12,913	
Yushu Batang Airport	Yushu, Qinghai	China	YUS	ZLYS	32°50′21″N 97°02′20″E	3,890	12,762	374,561
Inca Manco Cápac International Airport	Juliaca and Puno	Peru	JUL	SPJL	15°28′01″S 70°09′29″W	3,826	12,552	
Golog Maqin Airport	Golog, Qinghai	China	GMQ	ZLGL	34°25′18″N 100°18′5″E	3,788	12,428	132,161
Shigatse Peace Airport	Shigatse, Tibet	China	RKZ	ZURK	29°21′06″N 89°18′25″E	3,782	12,408	144,870
Syangboche Airport	Namche Bazaar, Solukhumbu	Nepal	SYH	VNSB	27°48′40.4″N 86°42′44.2″E	3,780	12,402	
Juan Mendoza Airport	Oruro	Bolivia	ORU	SLOR	17°57′45″S 67°04′34″W	3,702	12,146	
Uyuni Airport	Uyuni	Bolivia	UYU	SLUY	20°27′00″S 66°50′32″W	3,665	12,024	
Lhasa Gonggar International Airport	Lhasa, Tibet	China	LXA	ZULS	29°17′52″N 90°54′43″E	3,570	11,713	4,779,386
Ngawa Hongyuan Airport	Hongyuan, Sichuan	China	AHJ	ZUHY	32°31′45″N 102°21′25″E	3,535	11,598	22,748
Jiuzhai Huanglong Airport	Jiuzhaigou, Sichuan	China	JZH	ZUJZ	32°51′15″N 103°41′07″E	3,448	11,312	150,029
Andahuaylas Airport	Andahuaylas	Peru	ANS	SPHY	13°39′0″S 73°25′0″W	3,444	11,299	
Francisco Carle Airport	Jauja	Peru	JAU	SPJJ	11°47′0″S 75°28′0″W	3,363	11,033	
Manang Airport	Manang	Nepal	NGX	VNMA	28°37′59.99″N 84°00′00″E	3,353	11,001	
Alejandro Velasco Astete International Airport	Cusco	Peru	CUZ	SPZO	13°32′8″S 71°56′37″W	3,310	10,860	3,209,153
Ninglang Luguhu Airport	Ninglang, Yunnan	China	NLH	ZPNL	27°32′38″N 100°45′27″E	3,293	10,804	74,373
Diqing Shangri-La Airport	Shangri-La, Yunnan	China	DIG	ZPDQ	27°47′36″N 99°40′38″E	3,280	10,761	369,848
Tashkurgan Khunjerab Airport	Tashkurgan, Xinjiang	China	HQL	ZWTK	37°39′46″N 75°17′32″E	3,258	10,689	
Kushok Bakula Rimpochee Airport	Leh, Ladakh	India	IXL	VILH	34°08′09″N 77°32′47″E	3,256	10,682	1,260,725
Gannan Xiahe Airport	Xiahe, Gansu	China	GXH	ZLXH	34°48′38″N 102°38′41″E	3,203	10,509	88,502
Haibei Qilian Airport	Qilian, Qinghai	China	HBQ	ZLHB	38.012°N 100.644°E	3,163	10,377	3,612
Alcantarí Airport	Sucre	Bolivia	SRE	SLAL	19°14′49″S 65°08′59″W	3,112	10,210	
Lake County Airport	Leadville, Colorado	United States	LXV	KLXV	39°13′13″N 106°19′00″W	3,026	9,928	
San Luis Airport	Ipiales	Colombia	IPI	SKIP	00°51′43″N 77°40′18″W	2,976	9,764	
Nyingchi Mainling Airport	Mainling, Tibet	China	LZY	ZUNZ	29°18′12″N 94°20′07″E	2,949	9,675	515,780
Haixi Mangnai Airport	Mangnai, Qinghai	China	HTT	ZLHX	38°12′12″N 90°50′30″E	2,945	9,662	64,747
Teniente Coronel Luis A. Mantilla International Airport (closed)	Tulcán	Ecuador	TUA	SETU	00°48′34″N 077°42′29″W	2,941	9,649	
Juana Azurduy de Padilla International Airport (closed)	Sucre	Bolivia	none (former: SRE)	none (former: SLSU)	19°0′25″S 65°17′19″W	2,904	9,528	
Haixi Delingha Airport	Delingha, Qinghai	China	HXD	ZLDL	37°7′30″N 97°16′7″E	2,860	9,383	57,092
Golmud Airport	Golmud, Qinghai	China	GOQ	ZLGM	36°24′02″N 94°47′10″E	2,842	9,324	313,215
Simikot Airport	Simikot	Nepal	IMK	VNST	29°58′9.59″N 81°49′4.79″E	2,818	9,245	
Old Mariscal Sucre International Airport (closed)	Quito	Ecuador	none (former: UIO)	none (former: SEQU)	00°08′28″S 078°29′17″W	2,813	9,229	
Cotopaxi International Airport	Latacunga	Ecuador	LTX	SELT	00°54′25″S 078°36′57″W	2,806	9,206	
Tenzing-Hillary Airport	Lukla	Nepal	LUA	VNLK	27°41′16″N 86°43′53″E	2,774	9,101	129,508
Comandante FAP Germán Arias Graziani Airport	Huaraz	Peru	ATA	SPHZ	9°20′50″S 77°35′54″W	2,773	9,098	
Telluride Regional Airport	Telluride, Colorado	United States	TEX	KTEX	37°57′14″N 107°54′31″W	2,767	9,078	22,540
Jomsom Airport	Jomsom	Nepal	JMO	VNJS	28°46′33.59″N 83°43′12.59″E	2,736	8,976	
Mayor General FAP Armando Revoredo Iglesias Airport	Cajamarca	Peru	CJA	SPJR	7°8′21″S 78°29′21″W	2,676	8,780	
Shennongjia Hongping Airport	Shennongjia, Hubei	China	HPG	ZHSN	31°38′01″N 110°20′17″E	2,580	8,465	20,263
Toluca International Airport	Toluca	Mexico	TLC	MMTO	19°20′13″N 99°33′57″W	2,580	8,465	585,036
Rodríguez Ballón International Airport	Arequipa	Peru	AQP	SPQU	16°20′28″S 71°34′59″W	2,562	8,406	1,990,820
Yongphulla Airport	Trashigang	Bhutan	YON	VQTY	27°15′23″N 91°30′52″E	2,562	8,406	
Angel Fire Airport	Angel Fire, New Mexico	United States	AXX	KAXX	36°25′19″N 105°17′24″W	2,554	8,379	
El Dorado International Airport	Bogotá	Colombia	BOG	SKBO	04°42′5″N 74°8′49″W	2,548	8,360	36,478,591
Jorge Wilstermann International Airport	Cochabamba	Bolivia	CBB	SLCB	17°25′15″S 66°10′37″W	2,548	8,360	
Mariscal Lamar International Airport	Cuenca	Ecuador	CUE	SECU	02°53′22″S 078°59′04″W	2,532	8,307	

== See also ==
- List of lowest airports
