= KGT =

KGT may refer to:

- Kangding Airport, Sichuan Province, China, IATA code
- Kilgetty railway station, Pembrokeshire, Wales, code
- Kyrgyzstan Time (UTC+06:00)
