= Gannan =

Gannan may refer to the following locations in China:

- Gannan County (甘南县), Qiqihar, Heilongjiang
- Gannan Tibetan Autonomous Prefecture (甘南藏族自治州), Gansu
- Gannan Xiahe Airport, serving Gannan Tibetan Autonomous Prefecture
- Ganzhou, which is often referred to as "Gannan" (赣南)
