= Garze Kangding Airport =

Airport in Kangding, Sichuan, China

Garze Kangding Airport 甘孜康定机场
- IATA: KGT; ICAO: ZUKD

Summary
- Airport type: Public
- Operator: Sichuan Airport Group
- Location: Kangding, Sichuan
- Opened: 26 April 2009; 17 years ago
- Elevation AMSL: 4,280 m / 14,042 ft
- Coordinates: 30°09′27″N 101°44′05″E

Map
- Location of airport in Sichuan

Runways
Direction	Length		Surface
Direction	m	ft	Surface
15/33	4,000	13,123	Concrete

Statistics (2021)
- Passengers: 25,417
- Aircraft movements: 944
- Cargo (metric tons): 2.9

Garze Kangding Airport
- Simplified Chinese: 甘孜康定机场
- Traditional Chinese: 甘孜康定機場
Transcriptions
Standard Mandarin
- Hanyu Pinyin: Gānzī Kāngdìng Jīchǎng

Ganzi Kangding Airport (IATA: KGT, ICAO: ZUKD) is an airport serving Kangding, the capital of Garzê Tibetan Autonomous Prefecture in western Sichuan Province, China. It is located 40 kilometres (25 mi) northwest of the city center. Construction of the airport began in September 2006 and the airport started operation on April 26, 2009.

Situated at 4,280 m (14,042 ft) above sea level, Kangding Airport is the fourth highest airport in the world behind Daocheng Yading Airport, Qamdo Bamda Airport, and Shigatse Tingri Airport, and just higher than Ngari Gunsa Airport (elevation 4,274 m (14,022 ft)).

== Airlines and destinations ==
Airlines	Destinations
Sichuan Airlines	Chengdu–Shuangliu

== Incidents ==
Two China Eastern pilots had their licences revoked and an assistant captain was suspended from flying after a failed landing at Kangding Airport on 1 May 2016. They were attempting to land an Airbus A319 on a scheduled flight MU5443 from Chengdu to Kangding. An attempt was made to land during bad weather; the aircraft hit the ground outside the runway at great speed, almost causing a serious crash. The aircraft suffered damage to its landing gear and tail, and returned to Chengdu after missing the approach. The co-pilot was seated in the cabin, with the assistant captain in the cockpit, however two experienced captains are required to be at the controls when landing at this high altitude airport.

== See also ==
- List of airports in China
- List of the busiest airports in China
