= Haixi Delingha Airport =

Haixi Delingha Airport 海西德令哈机场
- IATA: HXD; ICAO: ZLDL

Summary
- Airport type: Public
- Location: Delingha, Qinghai, China
- Opened: 16 June 2014
- Elevation AMSL: 2,860 m / 9,383 ft
- Coordinates: 37°07′30″N 097°16′07″E

Map
- Location of airport in Qinghai

Runways
Direction	Length		Surface
Direction	m	ft	Surface
07/25	3,000	9,843

Statistics (2021)
- Passengers: 57,092
- Aircraft movements: 1,320
- Cargo (metric tons): 411.8
- Source: Xinhua, GCM, STV

Haixi Delingha Airport
- Simplified Chinese: 海西德令哈机场
- Traditional Chinese: 海西德令哈機場
Transcriptions
Standard Mandarin
- Hanyu Pinyin: Hǎixī Délìnghā Jīchǎng

Haixi Delingha Airport (IATA: HXD, ICAO: ZLDL) is an airport serving Delingha City, the capital of the Haixi Mongol and Tibetan Autonomous Prefecture in Qinghai Province, China. The airport is located 29 kilometres (18 mi) southwest of the city center, on the south bank of Bayin River.

Construction began on 27 May 2011, with a total investment of 630 million yuan. The airport was opened on 16 June 2014, with the inaugural flight China Eastern Airlines MU2241 from Xining Caojiabao Airport. Delingha is the fourth civil airport in Qinghai.

== Facilities ==
The airport has a 3,000-metre (9,800 ft) runway (class 4C), and a 4,000-square-metre (43,000 sq ft) terminal building. It is projected to handle 200,000 passengers annually by 2020.

== Airlines and destinations ==
Airlines	Destinations
China Eastern Airlines	Huatugou, Xining
Loong Air	Hangzhou

== See also ==
- List of airports in China
- List of the busiest airports in China
- List of highest airports
