= Shennongjia Hongping Airport =

Airport in Shennongjia, Hubei, China

Shennongjia Hongping Airport 神农架红坪机场
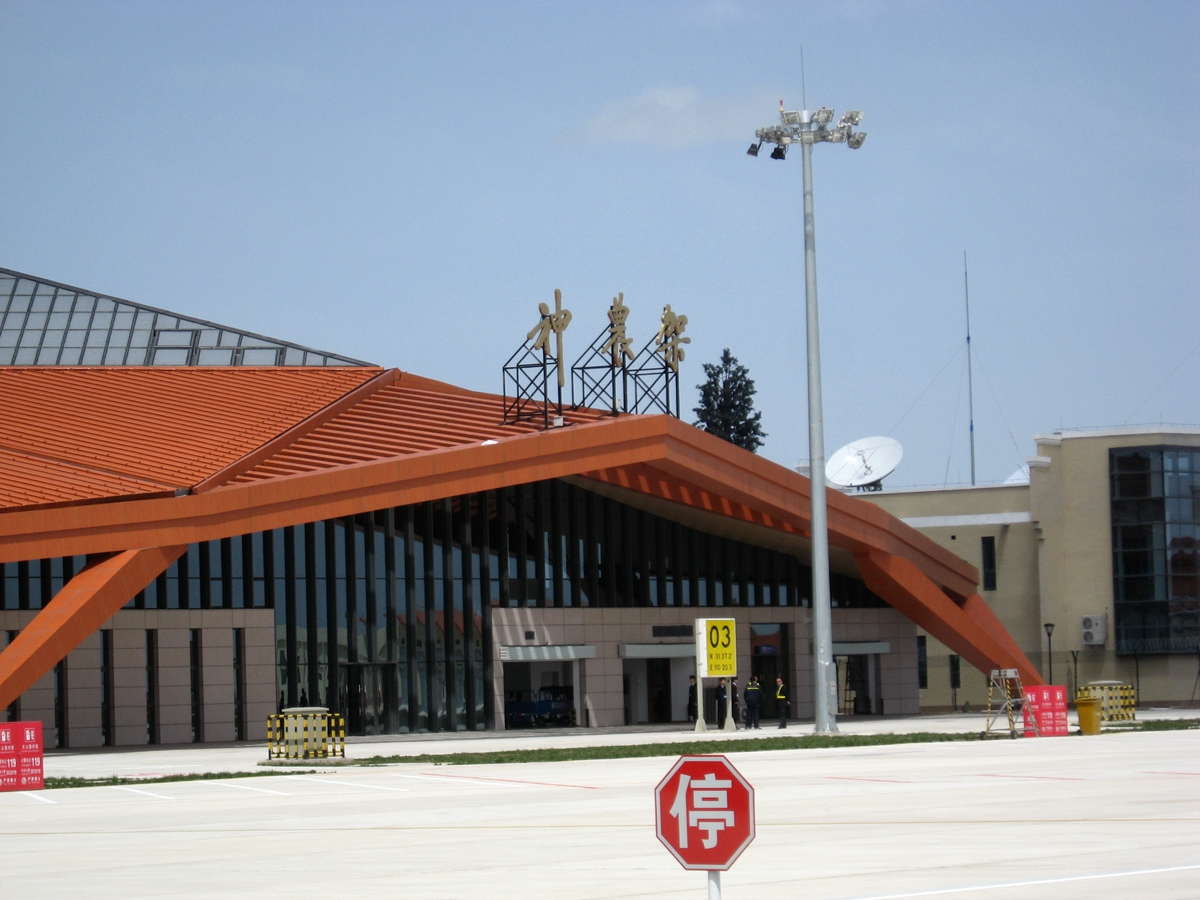
- IATA: HPG; ICAO: ZHSN

Summary
- Airport type: Public
- Serves: Shennongjia, Hubei
- Location: Hongping, Shennongjia
- Opened: 8 May 2014; 12 years ago
- Elevation AMSL: 2,580 m / 8,465 ft
- Coordinates: 31°38′01″N 110°20′17″E

Map
- Location of airport in Hubei

Runways
Direction	Length		Surface
Direction	m	ft	Surface
17/35	2,800	9,186	Concrete

Statistics (2021)
- Passengers: 20,263
- Aircraft movements: 688
- Sources: STV

Shennongjia Hongping Airport
- Simplified Chinese: 神农架红坪机场
- Traditional Chinese: 神農架紅坪機場
Transcriptions
Standard Mandarin
- Hanyu Pinyin: Shénnóngjià Hóngpíng Jīchǎng

Shennongjia Hongping Airport (IATA: HPG, ICAO: ZHSN) is an airport serving the Shennongjia forestry district in the west of Hubei province. It is located in the town of Hongping. Construction started in April 2011 with a total investment of over 1 billion yuan. The airport was opened on 8 May 2014, with an inaugural China Eastern Airlines flight from Shanghai Pudong International Airport with a stop in Wuhan Tianhe International Airport.

At an elevation of 2,580 metres (8,460 ft) above sea level, Shennongjia Airport is the highest airport in China outside the Tibetan Plateau. The airport attracted controversy in China when the media reported that its construction involved significant damage to the environment, as many hills were leveled and caves filled in the Shennongjia natural preserve.

== Facilities ==
The airport has a runway that is 2,800 metres (9,200 ft) long and 45 metres (148 ft) wide, and a 3,000-square-meter terminal building. It is projected to handle 250,000 passengers annually by 2020.

== Airlines and destinations ==
Airlines	Destinations
Chongqing Airlines	Guangzhou

== See also ==
- List of airports in China
- List of the busiest airports in China
- List of highest airports
