= Ninglang Luguhu Airport =

Ninglang Luguhu Airport 宁蒗泸沽湖机场
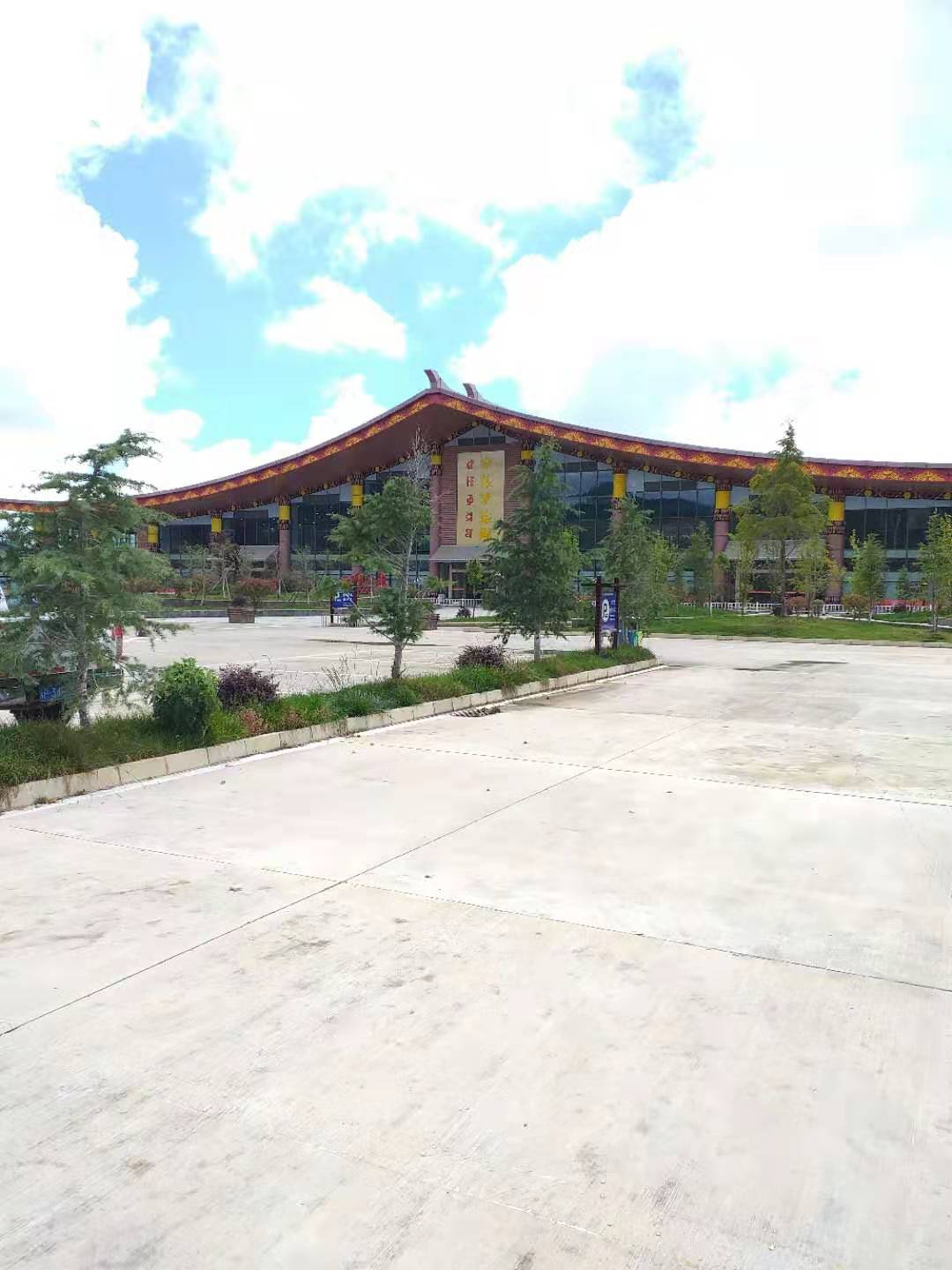
- IATA: NLH; ICAO: ZPNL

Summary
- Airport type: Public
- Serves: Ninglang County, Yunnan
- Location: Shifoshan, Hongqiao, Ninglang County
- Opened: 12 October 2015
- Elevation AMSL: 3,293 m / 10,804 ft
- Coordinates: 27°32′37.7″N 100°45′26.6″E

Map
- Location of airport in Yunnan

Runways
Direction	Length		Surface
Direction	m	ft	Surface
05/23	3,400	11,155	Concrete

Statistics (2021)
- Passengers: 74,373
- Aircraft movements: 1,380
- Cargo (metric tons): 106.6

Ninglang Luguhu Airport
- Simplified Chinese: 宁蒗泸沽湖机场
- Traditional Chinese: 寧蒗瀘沽湖機場
Transcriptions
Standard Mandarin
- Hanyu Pinyin: Nínglàng Lúgūhú Jīchǎng

Ninglang Luguhu Airport (IATA: NLH, ICAO: ZPNL) is an airport serving Ninglang Yi Autonomous County and Lugu Lake (Luguhu), in northwestern Yunnan province, China. It is located in the village of Shifoshan (石佛山村), Hongqiao Town, 25 kilometres (16 mi) from Lugu Lake and 50 kilometres (31 mi) from the Ninglang county seat, at an elevation of 3,293 metres (10,804 ft). Construction began in April 2013, and the airport, the 13th in Yunnan, was opened on 12 October 2015. The airports cost 1.298 billion yuan to build.

In 2019, the airport handled 2,168 flights and 200,000 passengers.

The airport facilities include an oxygen bar for passengers struggling with the high altitude. The airport is also notorious for commonly having challenging weather conditions for flight.

== Airlines and destinations ==
Airlines	Destinations
China Eastern Airlines	Kunming

== See also ==
- List of highest airports
