= Shigatse Tingri Airport =

Airport in Tingri, Shigatse, China

Shigatse Tingri Airport 日喀则定日机场
- IATA: DDR; ICAO: ZUDR

Summary
- Airport type: Public/Military
- Location: Tingri Town, Tingri County, Shigatse, Tibet
- Opened: 24 December 2022
- Elevation AMSL: 4,316 m (14,160 ft)
- Coordinates: 28.6025°N 86.8103°E

Map
- Location of airport in Tibet

Runways
Direction	Length		Surface
Direction	m	ft	Surface
09/27	4,500	14,764	Concrete

Shigatse Tingri Airport
- Simplified Chinese: 日喀则定日机场
- Traditional Chinese: 日喀則定日機場
Transcriptions
Standard Mandarin
- Hanyu Pinyin: Rìkāzé Dìngrì Jīchǎng

Shigatse Tingri Airport, also called Rikaze Tingri Airport (IATA: DDR, ICAO: ZUDR) is a high-altitude airport in Tingri County, Shigatse, Tibet Autonomous Region. Construction began in August 2019 and the airport was opened in December 2022.

The airport is approximately 90 km from Tingri Town.

== Airlines and destinations ==
Airlines	Destinations
Air China	Chengdu–Shuangliu, Lhasa
Shenzhen Airlines	Chengdu–Shuangliu
