= Ngari Gunsa Airport =

Airport in Ngari, Tibet, China

Ngari Gunsa Airport 阿里昆莎机场
- IATA: NGQ; ICAO: ZUAL

Summary
- Airport type: Military/Public
- Serves: Shiquanhe
- Location: Gar Chongsar, Günsa Township, Ngari Prefecture, Tibet
- Elevation AMSL: 4,274 m / 14,022 ft
- Coordinates: 32°06′31″N 80°03′10″E

Map
- Location of airport in Tibet

Runways
Direction	Length		Surface
Direction	m	ft	Surface
15/33	4,500	14,764	Asphalt

Statistics (2021)
- Passengers: 190,056
- Aircraft movements: 2,535
- Cargo (metric tons): 90.5

Ngari Gunsa Airport
- Simplified Chinese: 阿里昆莎机场
- Traditional Chinese: 阿里昆莎機場
Transcriptions
Standard Mandarin
- Hanyu Pinyin: Ālǐ Kūnshā Jīchǎng

Ali Kunsha Airport, also called Ngari Günsa Airport, (IATA: NGQ, ICAO: ZUAL), also known as Shiquanhe Airport, is a dual-use military and civil airport serving the town of Shiquanhe in Ngari Prefecture of Tibet region of China. It is located in the Günsa Township, roughly 90 km from Shiquanhe. It started operations on 1 July 2010, becoming the fourth civil airport in Tibet after Lhasa, Nyingchi, and Qamdo airports.

Situated at 4,274 m (14,022 ft) above sea level, Gunsa Airport is the fifth highest airport in the world after Daocheng Yading Airport, Qamdo Bamda Airport, Shigatse Tingri Airport and Garze Kangding Airport. Gunsa airport has a 4,500-meter runway. It is expected to handle 120,000 passengers by 2020. Construction began in May 2007 and cost an estimated 1.65 billion yuan (241.22 million U.S. dollars).

As Shiquanhe (Ali) is only a one-day bus drive (about 330 km) from the settlement of Darchen situated just north of Lake Manasarovar, facing Mount Kailash, it is expected to benefit pilgrims to these two sites, which are considered sacred by Hindus, Buddhists, Bonpa and Jains. With the opening of Shigatse Peace Airport in October 2010, the five airports, coupled with the Qinghai–Tibet railway and a network of roads, are expected to increase tourism to scenic and holy sites in Tibet.

== Military buildup ==
Since the last major standoff between China and India at Doklam in 2017 military presence at the Ngari Gunsa Airport has been expanded with Shenyang J-16s and J-11s fighter jets stationed. The airport is 200 kilometres from Pangong Tso, Ladakh.

== Airlines and destinations ==
Airlines	Destinations
China Eastern Airlines	Kashgar, Xi'an
Lucky Air	Kashgar, Ürümqi
Tibet Airlines	Kashgar, Lhasa, Shache, Xining

== See also ==
- List of airports in China
- List of the busiest airports in China
- List of highest airports
- Ngari Burang Airport
