= Ngari Burang Airport =

Airport in Ngari, Tibet, China

Ngari Burang Airport 阿里普兰机场
- IATA: APJ; ICAO: ZUPL

Summary
- Elevation AMSL: 4,250 m (13,940 ft)
- Coordinates: 30°23′51″N 81°08′19″E

Map
- Location of airport in Tibet

Runways
Direction	Length		Surface
Direction	m	ft	Surface
	4,500	14,764

Ngari Burang Airport
- Simplified Chinese: 阿里普兰机场
- Traditional Chinese: 阿里普蘭機場
Transcriptions
Standard Mandarin
- Hanyu Pinyin: Ālǐ Pǔlán Jīchǎng

Ali Pulan Airport (Ngari Burang Airport) (IATA: APJ, ICAO: ZUPL) is a dual-use military-civilian airport in Burang County, Ngari Prefecture, Tibet Autonomous Region.

== History ==
Construction of the airport was approved in April 2021. It is designed for 150,000 passengers and 600 tons of cargo annually. It is located in a strategic location along China's southwestern border at just 450 km from New Delhi.

The airport opened on 27 December 2023.

== Location ==
It is located at an elevation of 4,250 m (13,940 ft), 12 km from Burang Town.

== Airlines and destinations ==
Airlines	Destinations
Tibet Airlines	Lhasa

== See also ==
- Ngari Gunsa Airport
