= Qamdo Bamda Airport =

Airport serving Qamdo, Tibet, China

Qamdo Bamda Airport 昌都邦达机场 ཆབ་མདོ་སྤང་མདའ་གནམ་གྲུ་ཐང་
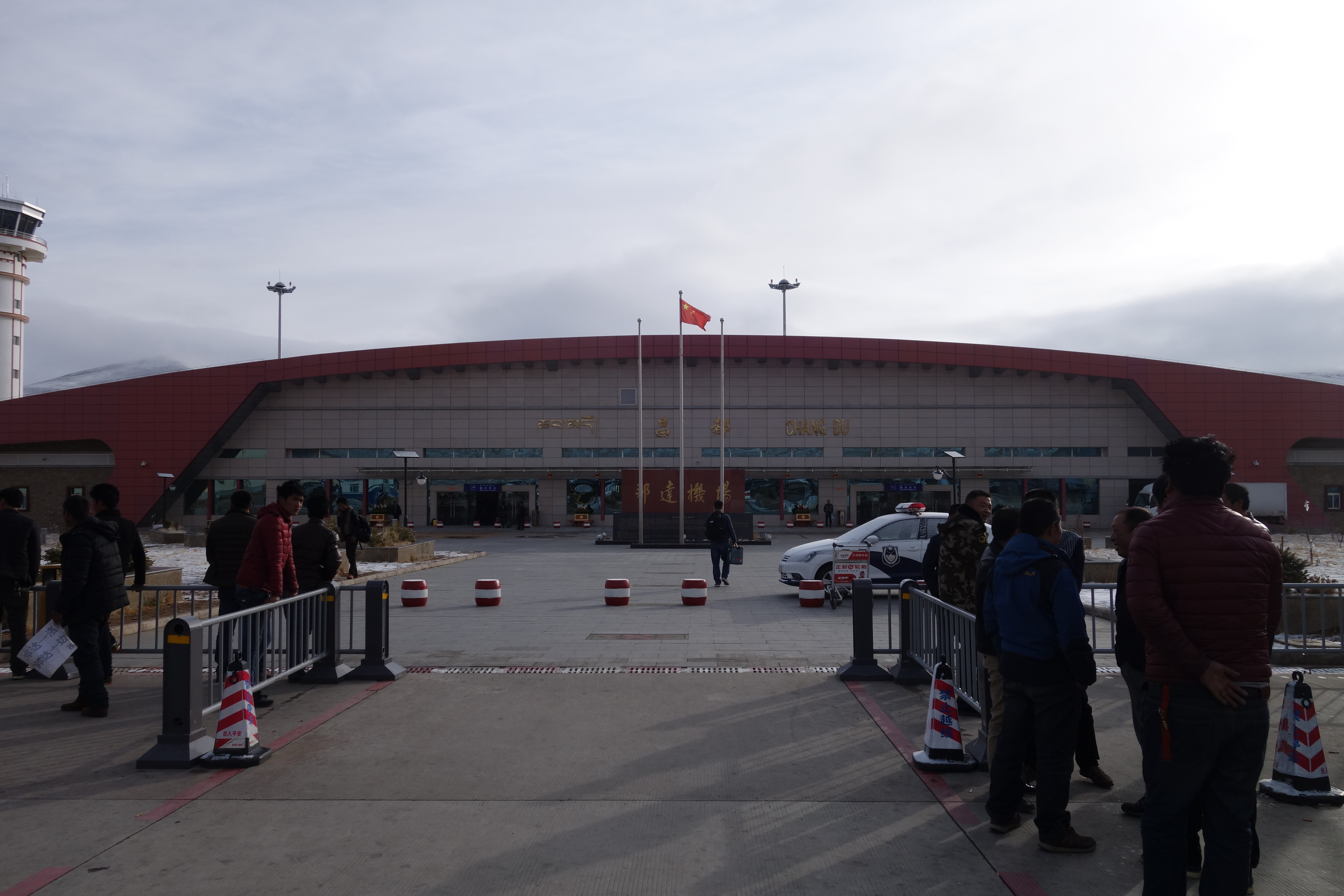
- IATA: BPX; ICAO: ZUBD

Summary
- Airport type: Public
- Serves: Qamdo, Tibet, China
- Location: Bamda, Baxoi County, Tibet
- Opened: 22 October 1994; 32 years ago
- Elevation AMSL: 4,334 m (14,219 ft)
- Coordinates: 30°33′13″N 97°06′31″E

Map
- Location of airport in Tibet

Runways
Direction	Length		Surface
Direction	m	ft	Surface
~~14/32~~ (Note: Once the longest runway in the world.)	~~5,500~~	~~18,045~~	~~Concrete~~
14/32	4,500	14,764	Asphalt

Statistics (2021)
- Passengers: 402,165
- Aircraft movements: 4,754
- Cargo (metric tons): 1,461.6

Qamdo Bamda Airport

Chinese name
- Simplified Chinese: 昌都邦达机场
- Traditional Chinese: 昌都邦達機場
Transcriptions
Standard Mandarin
- Hanyu Pinyin: Chāngdū Bāngdá Jīchǎng

Tibetan name
- Tibetan: ཆབ་མདོ་སྤང་མདའ་གནམ་གྲུ་ཐང་
Transcriptions
- Wylie: chab mdo spang mda' gnam gru thang

Changdu Bangda Airport (IATA: BPX, ICAO: ZUBD), also known as Qamdo Bamda Airport, is an airport serving Qamdo (Changdu), Tibet Autonomous Region, China. It is located in the village of Bamda (Bangda).

== Background ==
At an elevation of 4,334 m (14,219 ft) above sea level, Qamdo Airport was formerly the highest airport in the world. It was surpassed by Daocheng Yading Airport, with an elevation of 4,411 m (14,472 ft), on 16 September 2013. It has a very long runway, 4.5 km (2.8 mi), a necessary feature to accommodate the reduced engine and lift performance that affect aircraft at high altitude, requiring higher than normal takeoff speeds and therefore longer takeoff and landing runs.

Runway repairs took place in 2007 and 2013 after decay from the weather. A new 4,500-metre-long (14,800 ft) runway was built, and the original 5,500-metre-long (18,000 ft) runway was closed.

== Airlines and destinations ==
Airlines	Destinations
Air China	Chengdu–Shuangliu
Tibet Airlines	Beijing–Capital, Chengdu–Shuangliu, Chongqing, Kunming, Lhasa, Mianyang, Xi'an
West Air	Chongqing

== See also ==
- List of airports in China
- List of the busiest airports in China
- List of highest airports

== Notes ==
Records
Preceded by El Alto International Airport	World's highest airport 4,334 m (14,219 ft); 1994–2013	Succeeded by Daocheng Yading Airport
Preceded by Shigatse Peace Airport & Ulyanovsk Vostochny Airport	World's longest runway 5,500 m (18,045 ft)(Closed); 1994–2017	Succeeded by Shigatse Peace Airport & Ulyanovsk Vostochny Airport
