= Lhasa Gonggar International Airport =

International Airport serving Lhasa, Tibet, China

Lhasa Gonggar International Airport 拉萨贡嘎国际机场 ལྷ་ས་གོང་དཀར་རྒྱལ་སྤྱིའི་གནམ་གྲུ་ཐང་
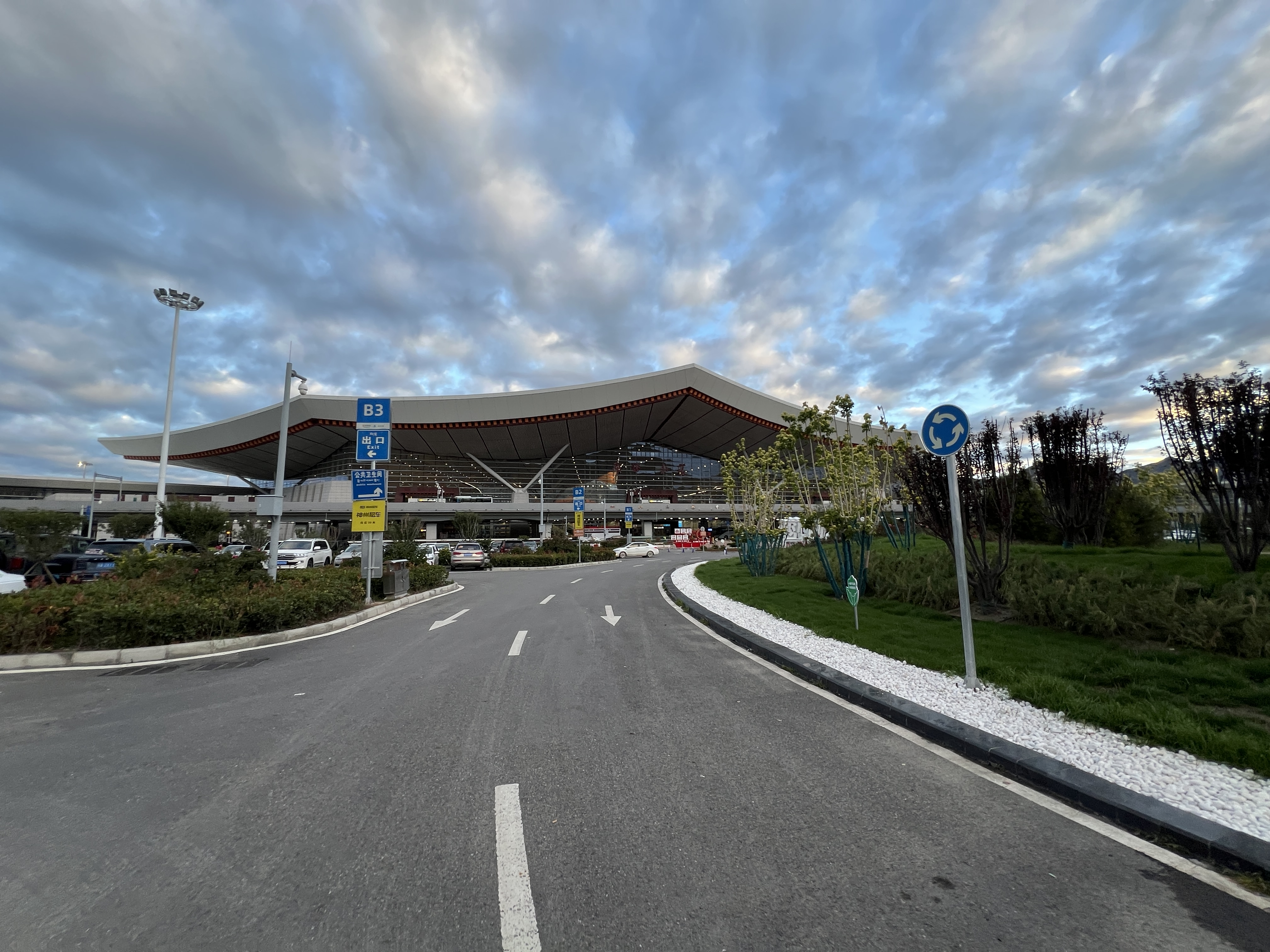
- IATA: LXA; ICAO: ZULS

Summary
- Airport type: Public/Military
- Serves: Lhasa; Shannan
- Location: Gonggar County, Shannan, Tibet, China
- Hub for: Tibet Airlines
- Elevation AMSL: 3,570 m (11,710 ft)
- Coordinates: 29°17′52″N 090°54′43″E

Maps
- CAAC airport chart
- Location in Tibet Location in China

Runways
Direction	Length		Surface
Direction	m	ft	Surface
10R/28L	4,000	13,123	Asphalt
10L/28R	4,000	13,123	Concrete

Statistics (2025)
- Passengers: 6,284,823
- Cargo (in tons): 49,562.9
- Aircraft movements: 52,073
- Source: List of the busiest airports in China

Lhasa Gonggar International Airport

Chinese name
- Simplified Chinese: 拉萨贡嘎国际机场
- Traditional Chinese: 拉薩貢嘎國際機場
Transcriptions
Standard Mandarin
- Hanyu Pinyin: Lāsà Gònggá Guójì Jīchǎng
- Wade–Giles: La^{1}-sa^{4} Kung^{4}-ka^{2} Kuo^{2}-chi^{4} Chi^{1}-ch'ang^{3}

Tibetan name
- Tibetan: ལྷ་ས་གོང་དཀར་རྒྱལ་སྤྱིའི་གནམ་གྲུ་ཐང་
Transcriptions
- Wylie: lha sa gong dkar rgyal spyi'i gnam gru thang

Lhasa Gonggar International Airport (IATA: LXA, ICAO: ZULS) also known as Lhasa Konggar International Airport is the airport serving Lhasa, the capital city of the Tibet Autonomous Region, People's Republic of China. It is about 97 kilometres (60 mi) to Lhasa and about 62 kilometres (39 mi) southwest of the city in Gyazhugling, Gonggar County of Shannan.

Situated at an elevation of 3,600 metres (11,800 ft), Lhasa Airport is one of the highest in the world. The airport was first built in 1965, a second runway was built in 1994, the second terminal was built in 2004, and the third terminal was operational in 2021. The airport handled more than 6 million passengers in 2024.

== History ==
Building an airport in Tibet, which is termed in flying parlance as going over a "hump" in the Tibetan Plateau, has gone through a process of trial and error through many hazardous air routes and several fatal accidents during World War II.

=== Damxung Airport ===
The first airport began construction in 1955 and was completed in May 1956, across river from Gongtang township in the southwest of Damxung County at a height of 4,200 metres (13,800 ft).

Due to remoteness this airport was serviced by a 4,500-metre (14,800 ft) gravel runway but needed constant maintenance due to high winds blowing away the stones.

Flights were sparse with a limited daily window in the morning, departure before afternoon to avoid high winds and eventually limited to flights to one per month or one month and a half. There was no terminal building (added later with two aprons on the southwest end) and staff lived in a small building on site.

An Ilyushin Il-12 and a Convair CV-240-401 were the first aircraft that landed at Damxung airport from the north and south. They thus broke the jinx of the "forbidden air zone", and this was acclaimed a feat. It took almost nine more years before the first Beijing-Chengdu-Lhasa air route became operational in 1965.

=== Gonggar Airport ===
In 1965, the Gonggar Airport was constructed to provide a more reliable location. Damxung Airport was decommissioned subsequently (site partially converted into a race course with footprint of runway visible from satellite views) and the Lhasa Aviation Office was moved from Damxung to Gonggar Airport.

This established the Gonngar Airport as the second airport in Tibet. Over the years, with more expansion of the facilities, Gonggar became the domestic hub in the Tibetan Plateau connecting many other airports in Tibet.

In 2021, Terminal 3 was put into service. It occupies a floor area of 88,000 m^{2} and has 21 extra gates for boarding and deplaning, enabling the airport to serve 9 million passengers per year by 2025. The new terminal has a lotus-shaped roof and rich Tibetan style architecture, paying homage to Tibetan culture and ethnic identity.

== Geographic environment ==
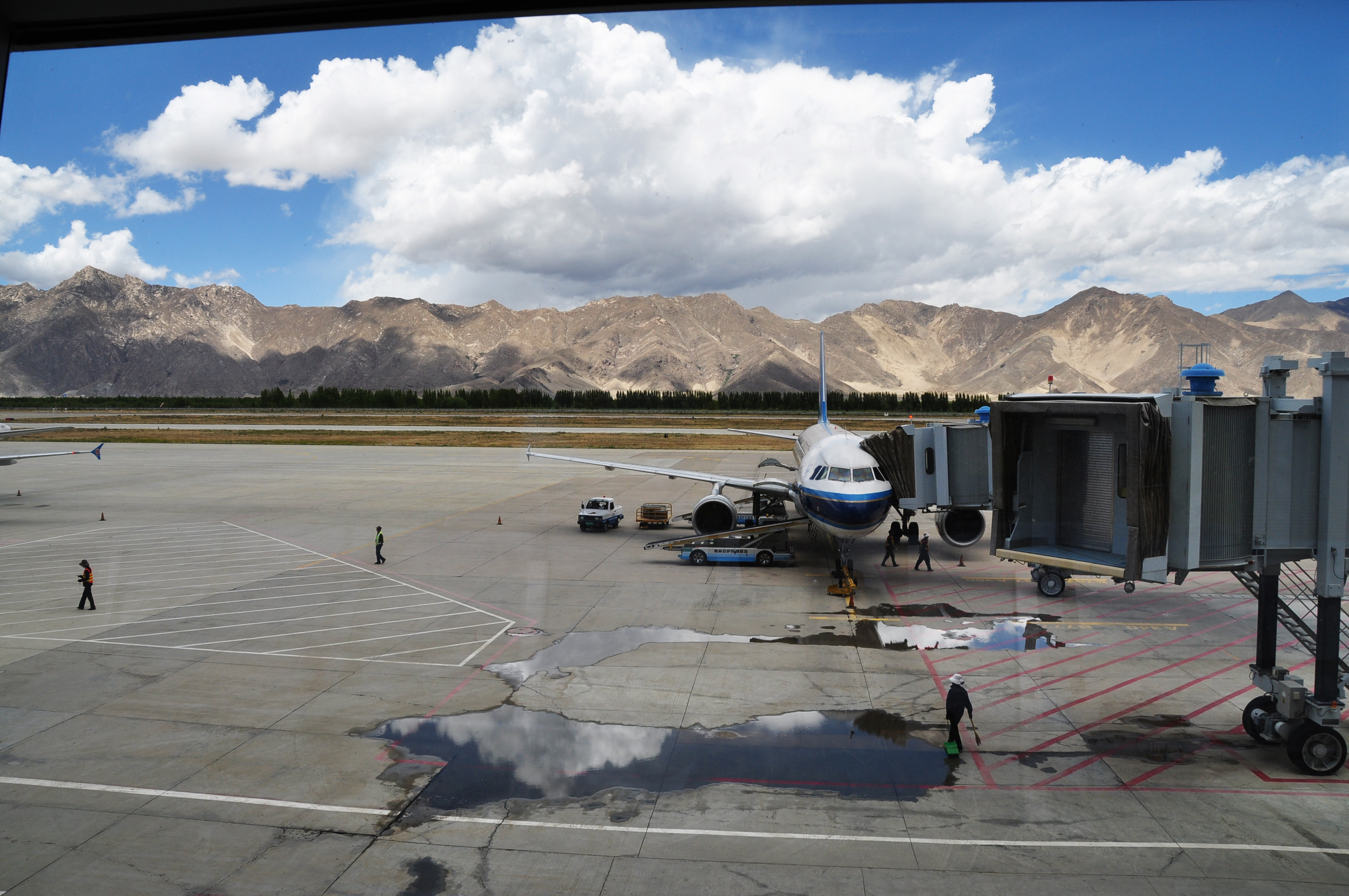
View from inside the terminal

Gonggar Airport is in Gyazuling township of the Gonggar County. It is built in the county where Yarlung Tsangpo River (the Brahmaputra River) is very wide on the right bank (southern bank) of the river providing facilities for the runways. It is for this reason that the airport was constructed at this location, though away from Lhasa where space was a limitation. The airport lies to the west of Rawa-me, which is the capital of the county, at the entry of the Namrab Valley, 87 kilometres (54 mi) from Tsetang. Within a radius of 30 kilometres (19 mi) the airport is surrounded by mountains with elevations ranging from 5,362–6,126 metres (17,592–20,098 ft). Access to the airport from Lhasa has been further facilitated by constructing a road tunnel, which has reduced the distance and time taken to reach the airport from Lhasa by 40 minutes; time of travel from Lhasa is now about 40–60 minutes by shuttle bus services. The tunnel and Lhasa Airport Expressway opened in July 2011.

== Airport description ==
At an elevation of 3,500 metres (11,500 ft) above sea level, the airport is one of the highest in the world. Its runway, with airport rank 4E, at 4,000 metres (13,000 ft) with a width of 45 metres (148 ft), is designed to handle wide-bodied aircraft in the thin Tibetan air. It has an area of 25,000 square metres (6.2 acres) with the passenger handling facilities of ticketing office, the baggage collection beltways and visitors gallery on the first floor of the new terminal building, and the departure lounge on the second floor with shopping malls, kiosks and restaurants. There are four aero bridges (one two-way bridge and three single-way bridges) to facilitate passengers to board and disembark from the aircraft. The airport began operation in 1965 with flights to Beijing and Chengdu commencing that March. Recent additions included the expansion of the existing terminal in 2004 and as a result the airport has the facility to check in 1,300 passengers per hour during peak hours.

Prior to the completion of the larger Terminal 3 in 2021, the airport only had parking facilities for five Airbus A340 or seven Boeing 757 aircraft.

The airport is connected to cities in the rest of China such as Beijing, Chengdu, Shanghai, Guangzhou, Chongqing, Xi'an, Xining, Kunming, Diqing and Chamdo. There are two international routes connecting Lhasa to Kathmandu and Pokhara.

== Flight handling ==
Flights to and from Lhasa Gonggar Airport are handled by a number of domestic airlines including Air China, China Eastern, China Southern, Shenzhen, Hainan, Sichuan, and Tibet Airlines, and one foreign airline, the Nepal-based Himalaya Airlines. It is typically not possible to purchase air tickets directly from these carriers given the requirement of obtaining the necessary governmental travel permit, which is not the same as the visa to gain entry into the rest of mainland China.

Pilots landing at Lhasa Gonggar Airport must be specially trained in handling manoeuvres at landing at the high altitude of 3,700 metres (12,100 ft). Nagqu Dagring Airport is planned to become the world's highest altitude airport by 2014 at 4,436 meters above sea level.

Given the frequency of strong air currents picking up in the afternoon, most flights into the airport are scheduled in the morning.

A night landing facility was created by fixing navigational lighting facilities on the runway at a cost of 99 million yuan (US$13.2 million) only in 2007. This adds to the handling capacity of the airport by about 40%. The night landing facility was commissioned on 14 November 2007 with the landing of an Airbus A319 aircraft of Air China carrying 90 passengers. This facility was made operational initially once a week on Wednesdays from Chengdu Shuangliu International Airport in Sichuan Province. With this facility the airport planned to handle 1.1 million passengers every year by 2010, as against 1.005 million in 2007.

The airport was able to accommodate an Airbus A330 overnight for the first time on 11 April 2017, a problem due to the airport's high altitude.

== Infrastructure ==
A new highway between Lhasa and the Gonggar Airport has been built by the Transportation Department of Tibet at a cost of RMB 1.5 billion yuan. It is a four-lane road of 37.68 kilometres (23.41 mi) length. This road is part of the National Highway 318; it starts from the Lhasa railway station, passes through the Caina Township in Qushui County, terminates between the north entrance of the Gala Mountain Tunnel and the south bridge head of Lhasa River Bridge, and en route goes over the first overpass of Lhasa at Liuwu Overpass.

== Airlines and destinations ==
Airlines	Destinations
Air China	Beijing–Capital, Chengdu–Shuangliu, Chengdu–Tianfu, Chongqing, Hongyuan
Chengdu Airlines	Chengdu–Shuangliu, Chengdu–Tianfu, Wuhan, Zhengzhou
China Eastern Airlines	Changsha, Chengdu–Tianfu, Diqing, Guangzhou, Hohhot, Kunming, Shanghai–Hongqiao, Shanghai–Pudong, Xi'an
China Southern Airlines	Chongqing, Guangzhou
Chongqing Airlines	Chongqing
Himalaya Airlines	Kathmandu, Pokhara–International
Lucky Air	Chengdu–Tianfu, Kunming, Mianyang, Wuhan, Xining, Zhengzhou
Sichuan Airlines	Chengdu–Shuangliu, Chengdu–Tianfu, Chongqing, Gannan, Hangzhou, Kunming, Mianyang, Ürümqi, Xi'an, Xining
West Air	Chongqing, Golmud, Guiyang, Hefei, Luzhou, Shiyan, Singapore, Zhengzhou, Zunyi–Maotai
Xizang Airlines	Beijing–Capital, Changchun, Changsha, Changzhou, Chengdu–Shuangliu, Chengdu–Tianfu, Chongqing, Dazhou, Guangyuan, Guiyang, Hangzhou, Hong Kong, Kunming, Lanzhou, Lijiang, Linyi, Luzhou, Mianyang, Nanchong, Nanjing, Nanning, Nantong, Ngari–Gunsa, Qamdo, Qingdao, Sanming, Shanghai–Hongqiao, Shenzhen, Shijiazhuang, Taiyuan, Tianjin, Wuhan, Xi'an, Xining, Xishuangbanna, Yibin, Zhengzhou

== See also ==
- List of highest airports
