= Daocheng Yading Airport =

Airport in Sichuan, People's Republic of China; highest civilian airport in the world

Daocheng Yading Airport 稻城亚丁机场 འདབ་པའི་ཉི་བརྟེན་གནམ་གྲུ་ཐང་
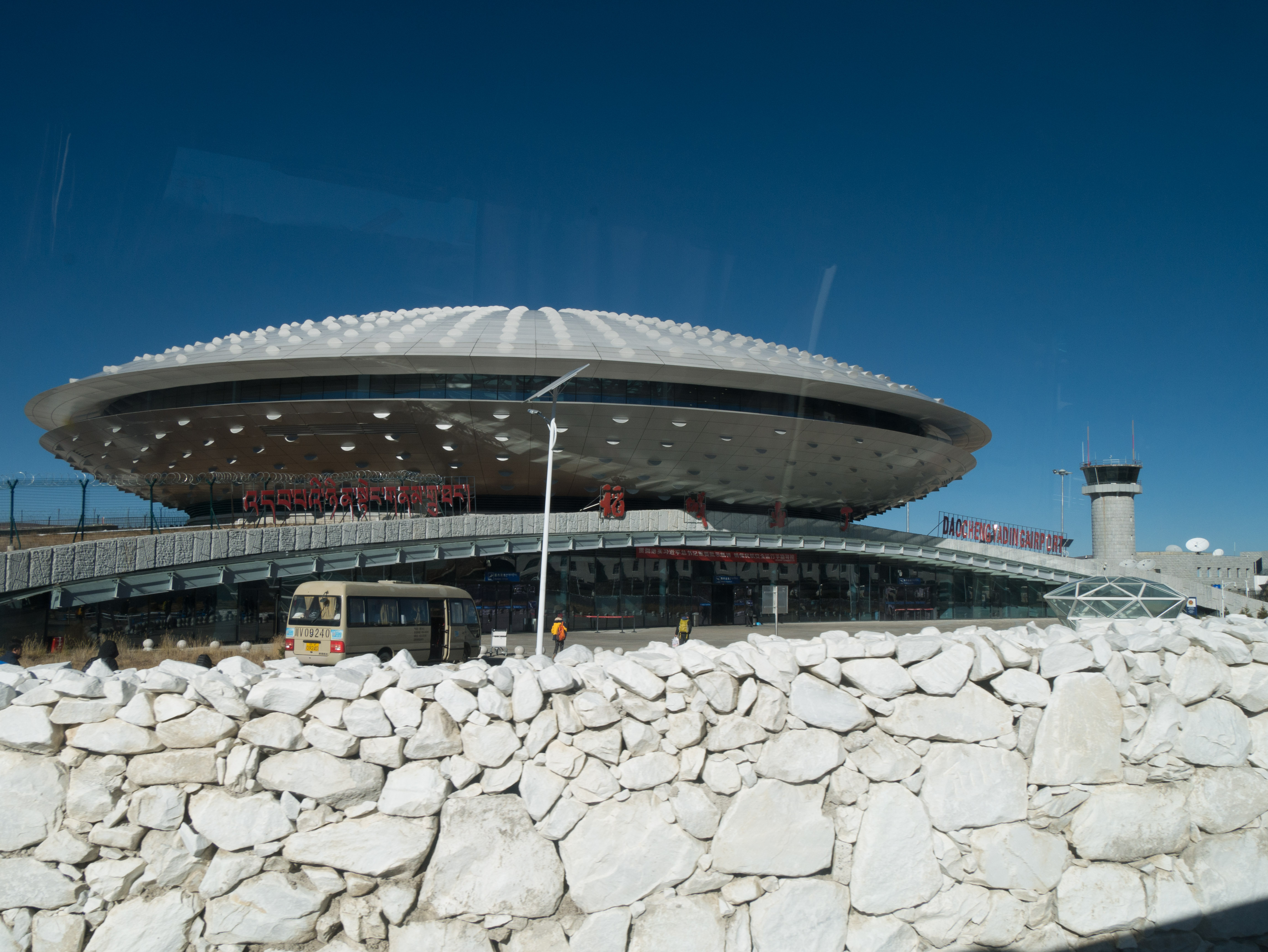
- Terminal Building
- IATA: DCY; ICAO: ZUDC

Summary
- Airport type: Public
- Serves: Daocheng, Sichuan, China
- Location: Sangdui Township
- Opened: 16 September 2013; 12 years ago
- Elevation AMSL: 4,411 m (14,472 ft)
- Coordinates: 29°19′23″N 100°03′12″E

Map
- Location of airport in Sichuan

Runways
Direction	Length		Surface
Direction	m	ft	Surface
16/34	4,200	13,780	Concrete

Statistics (2021)
- Passengers: 155,474
- Aircraft movements: 2,314
- Cargo (metric tons): 62.6

Daocheng Yading Airport
- Simplified Chinese: 稻城亚丁机场
- Traditional Chinese: 稻城亞丁機場
Transcriptions
Standard Mandarin
- Hanyu Pinyin: Dàochéng Yàdīng Jīchǎng

Daocheng Yading Airport (IATA: DCY, ICAO: ZUDC) is an airport serving Daocheng County in the Garzê Tibetan Autonomous Prefecture of Sichuan province, China. It is located in Sangdui Township, 50 kilometres (31 mi) north of the county seat and 130 kilometres (81 mi) from the Yading Nature Reserve.

At 4,411 m (14,472 ft) above sea level, Daocheng Yading is the highest civilian airport in the world.

Construction started after the airport was approved in April 2011, with a total investment of 1.58 billion yuan (US$255 million). The airport was opened on 16 September 2013. The inaugural flight was Air China Flight 4215 on an Airbus A319 from the provincial capital Chengdu, carrying 118 passengers. The opening of the airport reduced the distance between Daocheng and Chengdu from two days to an hour, and removed the need to take a bus.

== Facilities ==
Daocheng Yading Airport has a single runway that is 4,200 m (13,800 ft) long and 45 m (148 ft) wide (class 4C). It has a 5,000 m^{2} (54,000 sq ft) terminal building that is shaped like a flying saucer with two aerobridges. It is designed to handle 280,000 passengers per year.

== Airlines and destinations ==
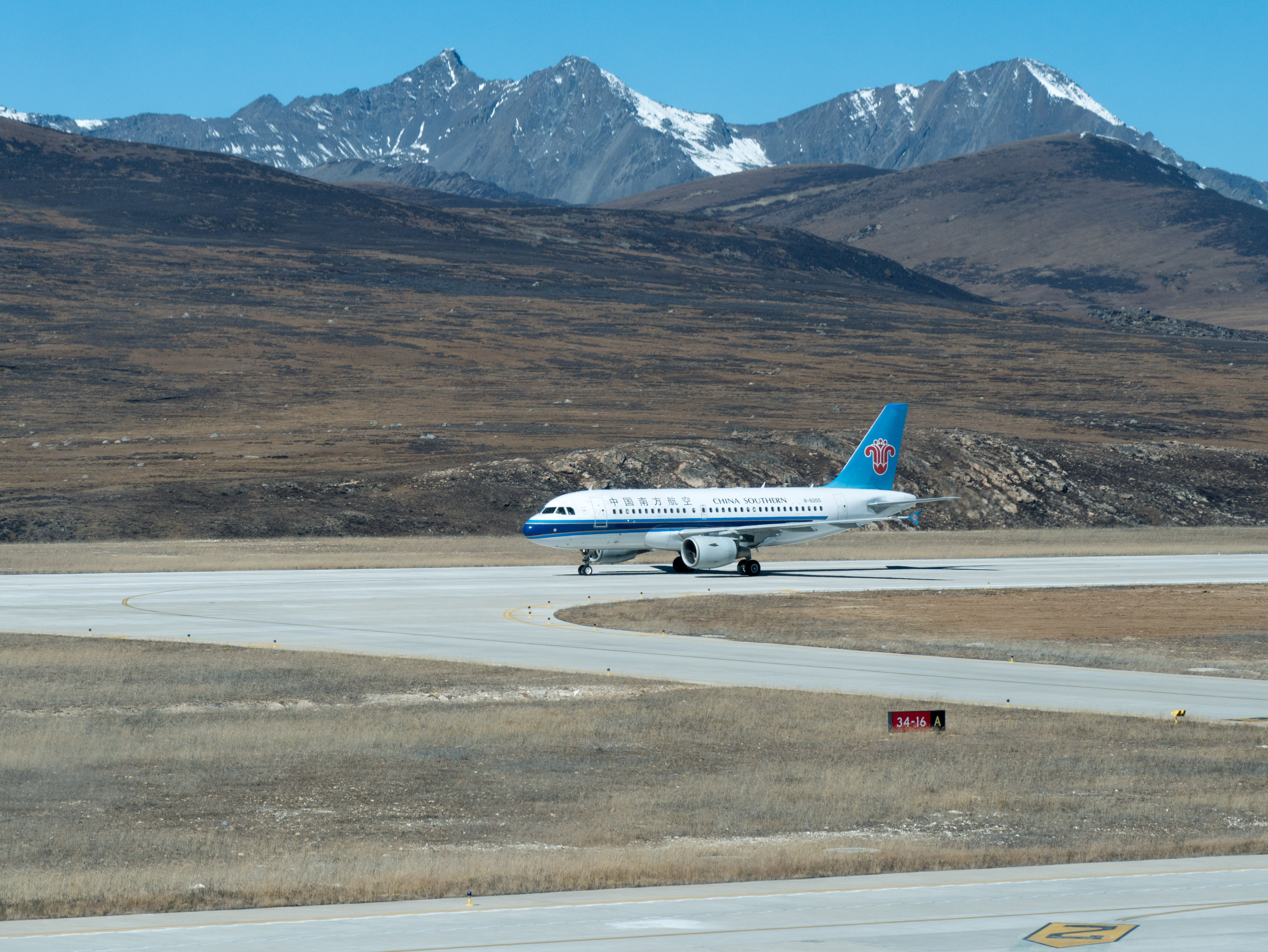
China Southern at DCY

Airlines	Destinations
Air China	Chengdu-Shuangliu, Chengdu–Tianfu
Sichuan Airlines	Chengdu-Shuangliu, Chengdu–Tianfu, Chongqing-Jiangbei

== See also ==
- List of airports in China
- List of the busiest airports in China
- List of highest airports

Records
Preceded by Qamdo Bamda Airport	World's highest airport 4,411 m (14,472 ft); 2013–present	Succeeded by Incumbent
