= Chengdu Shuangliu International Airport =

Airport serving Chengdu, Sichuan, China

Chengdu Shuangliu International Airport 成都双流国际机场
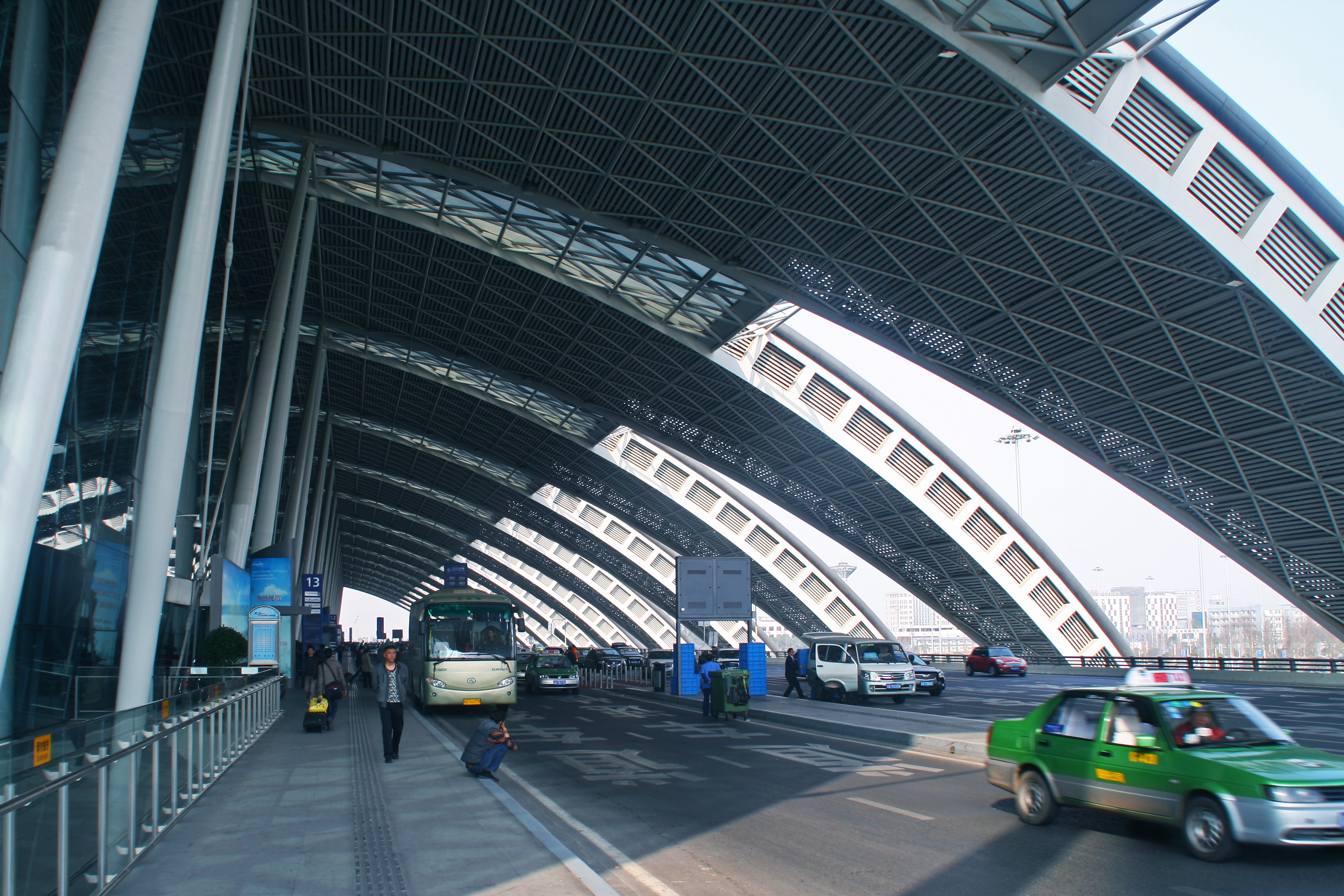
- Outside of Terminal 2
- IATA: CTU; ICAO: ZUUU

Summary
- Airport type: Public
- Owner: Sichuan Provincial Airport Group
- Operator: Chengdu Shuangliu International Airport Co., Ltd.
- Serves: Chengdu
- Location: Shuangliu, Chengdu, Sichuan, China
- Opened: 1938; 88 years ago
- Hub for: Air China; Chengdu Airlines; Sichuan Airlines; Tibet Airlines
- Elevation AMSL: 495 m (1,624 ft)
- Coordinates: 30°34′42″N 103°56′49″E
- Website: www.cdairport.com

Maps
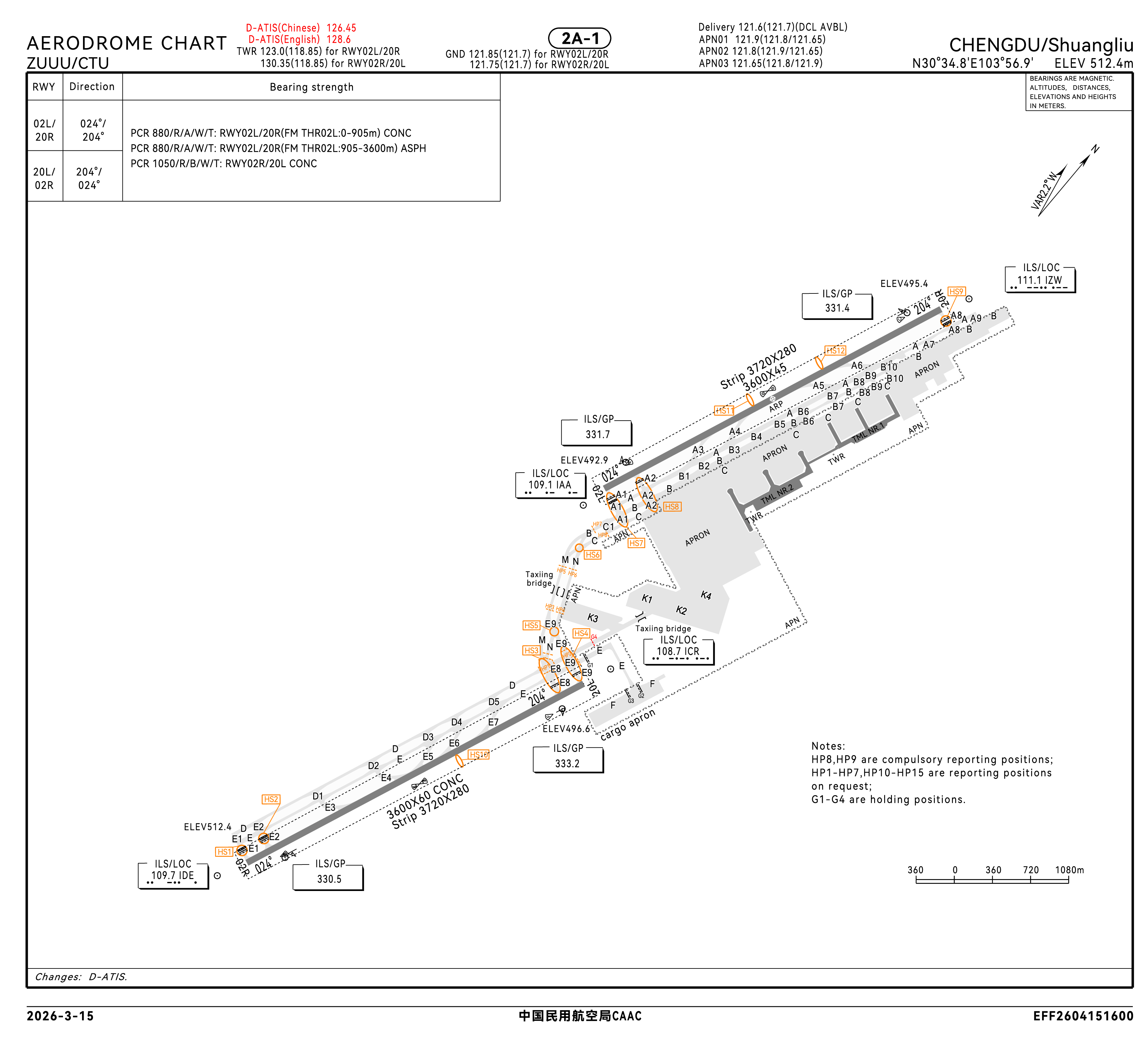
- CAAC airport chart

- Location in Sichuan Location in China

Runways
| Direction | Length | | Surface |
| Direction | m | ft | Surface |
|---|---|---|---|
| 02L/20R | 3,600 | 11,811 | Asphalt/Concrete |
| 02R/20L | 3,600 | 11,811 | Concrete |

Statistics (2025)
- Passengers: 33,518,945
- Aircraft movements: 222,551
- Freight (in tons): 735,575.7
- Source: List of the busiest airports in China

Chengdu Shuangliu International Airport
- Simplified Chinese: 成都双流国际机场
- Traditional Chinese: 成都雙流國際機場
Transcriptions
Standard Mandarin
- Hanyu Pinyin: Chéngdū Shuāngliú Guójì Jīchǎng
- Wade–Giles: Chʻêng^{2}-tu^{1} Shuang^{1}-liu^{2} Kuo^{2}-chi^{4} Chi^{1}-chʻang^{3}

Chengdu Shuangliu International Airport (IATA: CTU, ICAO: ZUUU; traditionally as Chengdu Airport) is one of two international airports serving Chengdu, the capital of Sichuan province in Southwestern China, with the other being Chengdu Tianfu International Airport. It is one of the oldest and busiest airports by passenger traffic in China.

Shuangliu Airport was built in 1938 and was formerly known as Chengdu Shuangguisi Airport (成都双桂寺机场) until 1956. It has been expanded eight times since then.

Located about 16 kilometers (10 mi) southwest of downtown Chengdu to the north of Shuangliu, Chengdu Shuangliu Airport is an important aviation hub for Western China. It is one of the two core hubs for Air China, the other being Beijing Capital International Airport. The airport is also the principal hub and headquarters for Sichuan Airlines and Chengdu Airlines. China Eastern Airlines, China Southern Airlines, Shenzhen Airlines, Lucky Air, and Tibet Airlines also have bases at Chengdu Shuangliu Airport.

== History ==
=== Republican era ===
The airport, formerly named Shuangguisi Airport, opened as a military-owned airport in 1938 during the Second Sino-Japanese War, a major theater of World War II. At the time, its runway was only large enough for small biplanes. It was also where the Republic of China Air Force Polikarpov I-15 fighters of the 5th Pursuit Group were based to defend the Chengdu area against Imperial Japanese bomber raids; this following the Chinese retreat from Wuhan to Chungking (now Chongqing) as the new provisional capital in aftermath of the Battle of Wuhan against the Imperial Japanese onslaught. Civilian targets were indiscriminately bombed, and ace fighter pilot of the Chinese Air Force Major Wong Sun-shui, Captain Cen Zeliu and Lieutenant Lin Heng (younger brother of renowned architect and poet Lin Huiyin) flying in their I-15 fighter planes were all killed over Shuangliu air base as a result of battling against the most advanced fighter aircraft of the time; the Mitsubishi A6M "Zero" (Reisen) fighter, in defense of Chengdu on 14 March 1941.

When the United States was shocked into World War II with the Pearl Harbor attack, the airport became known as "Shwangliu Airfield" as it was later used by the United States Army Air Forces Fourteenth Air Force as part of the China Defensive Campaign (1942–1945). It was used as a fighter base by the 33d Fighter Group, which flew P-47 Thunderbolt fighter-bombers from the airport in 1944 to support Chinese ground forces, and also by reconnaissance units that operated camera-equipped P-38 Lightnings that located Japanese forces and provided intelligence to the fighter-bombers. The Americans closed their facilities at Shwangliu Airfield at the end of August 1945.

=== People's Republic era ===
On 12 December 1956, Shuangguisi Airport was put under civil aviation, which was then formally listed as a civil aviation airport and renamed Chengdu Shuangliu Airport. In 1957, the flights of Chengdu civil aviation were shifted to Shuangliu Airport from Guanghan Airport. The flight courses from Chengdu were thus opened to various cities within China including Beijing, Taiyuan, Xi'an, Chongqing, Kunming, Guiyang, and Nanchong.

=== Current status ===
A large-scale expansion was conducted on flight area and navigation area from 1994 to 2001. The runway was extended to 3,600 metres (11,811 ft) with Class 4E rating, allowing for larger jumbo jets including the Boeing 747-400. The newly built terminal building was incorporated with a three-parallel-porch design, accommodating an hourly capacity of 3,500 passengers during rush hours, while the previous terminal building was only designated for regional flights within Sichuan and Chongqing.

The airport is now an international civil airport with flights to more than 50 international destinations and over 170 domestic airports, and is a hub for Chengdu Airlines, Air China and Sichuan Airlines. It is linked to downtown Chengdu by the Airport Expressway, the Chengdu–Mianyang–Leshan intercity railway and the newly built Chengdu Metro line 10 which has stations in both terminals. KLM launched the first intercontinental air route from Chengdu, to Amsterdam, on 28 May 2006.

The construction of its second runway started from late 2008, and service commenced in December 2009. The completed new runway, 3,600 metres (11,811 ft) in length and 60 metres (197 ft) in width, upgraded the previous flight area rating from 4E to 4F, capable of handling the Airbus A380.

On 9 June 2014, United Airlines began operating a nonstop service from San Francisco to Chengdu, connecting central China to the United States non-stop for the first time. Service to the US has since expanded, as Hainan Airlines now offers nonstop service from Chengdu to Los Angeles and began nonstop service to New York–JFK in October 2017.

With the opening of Chengdu Tianfu International Airport on 27 June 2021, all international and cargo routes were planned to be moved from Shuangliu Airport, which is to mainly operate certain domestic flights going forward. However, on July 30, 2026, most Hong Kong/Macau/Taiwan flights were relocated back to Shuangliu Airport following renovations.

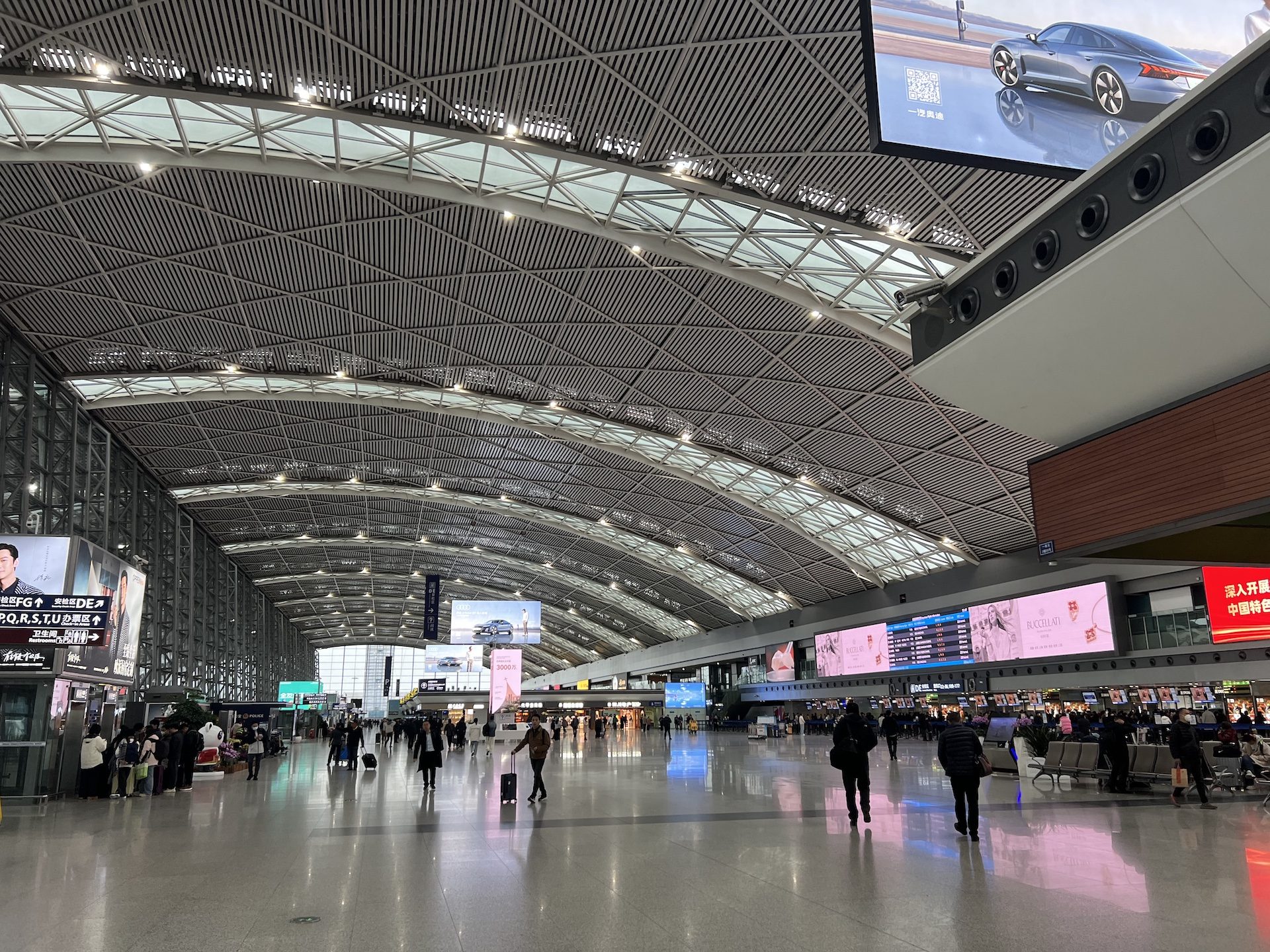
Terminal 2 Concourse

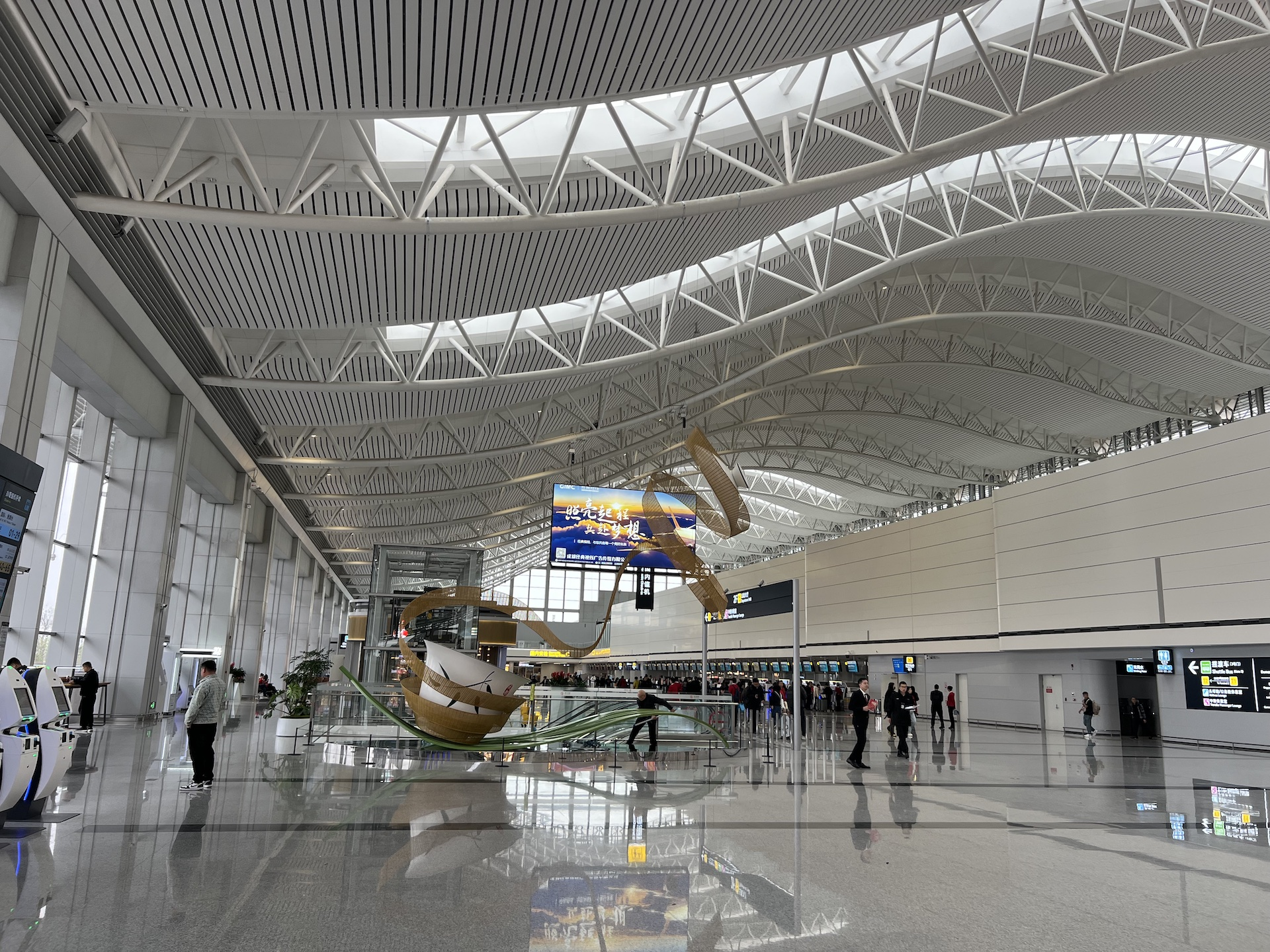
Terminal 1 Concourse

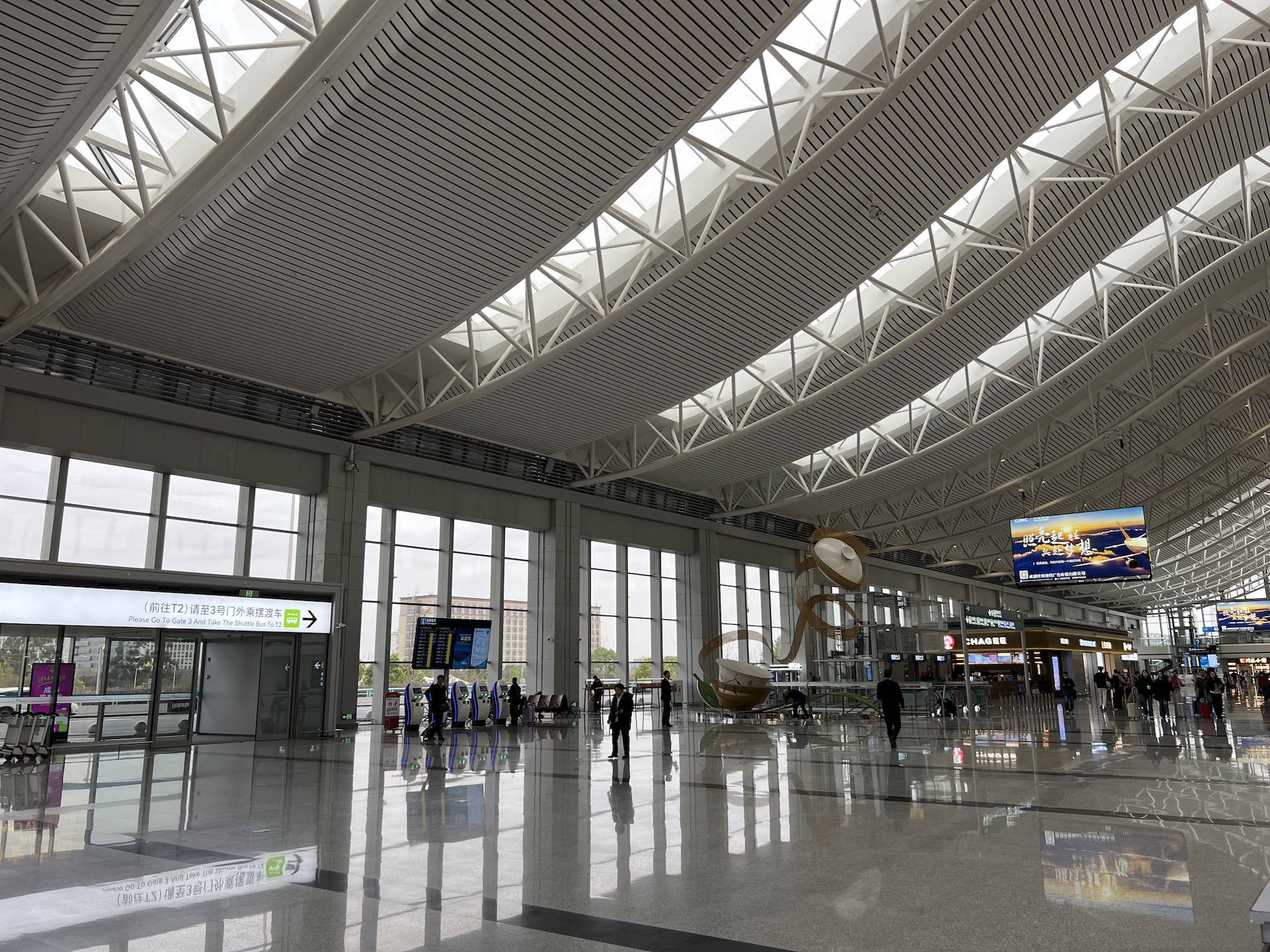
Terminal 1 Concourse

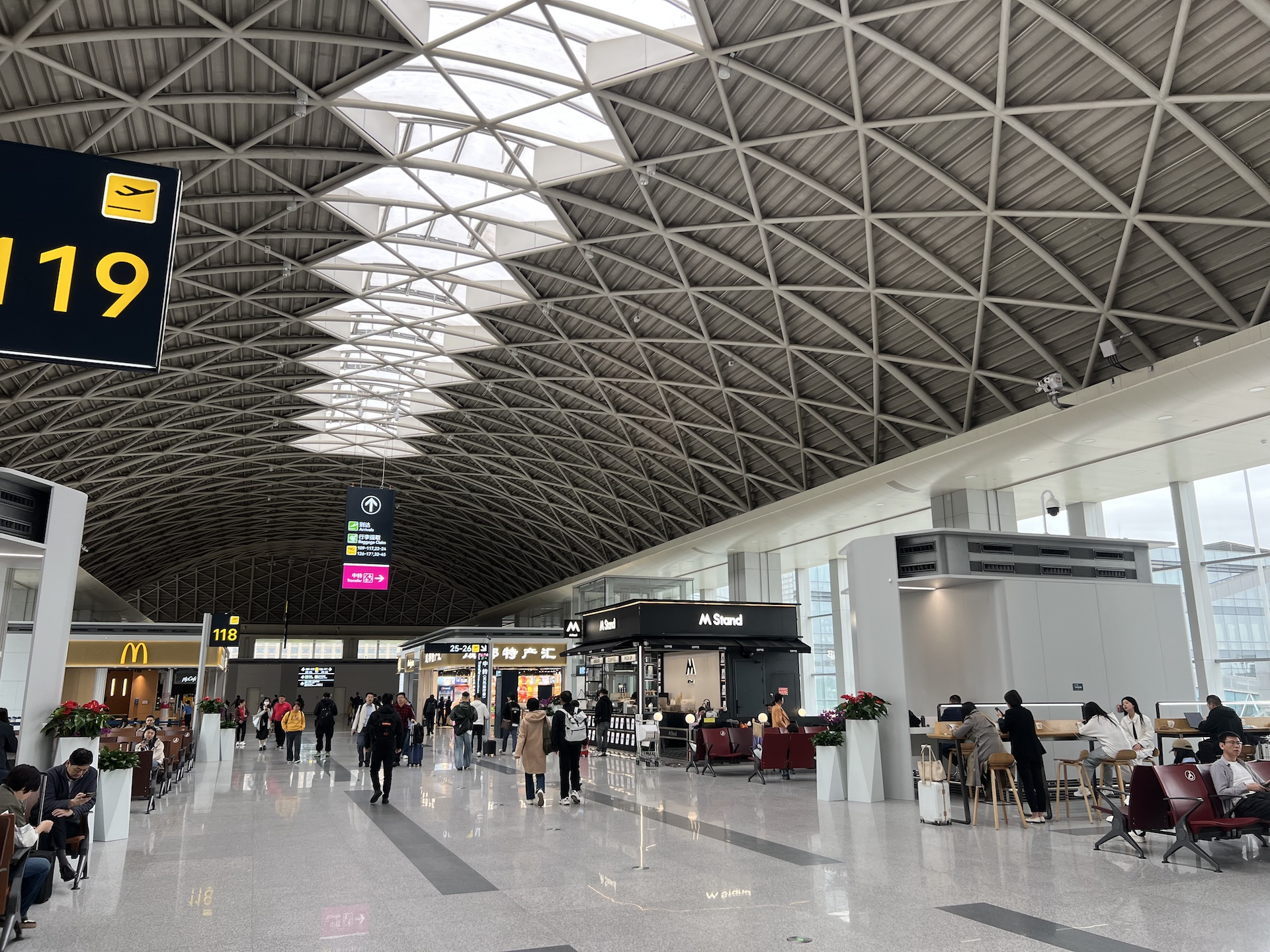
Terminal 1 Airside

== Airlines and destinations ==
=== Passenger ===
| Airlines | Destinations |
|---|---|
| Air China | Bazhong, Beihai, Beijing–Capital, Changsha, Dalian, Daocheng, Fuyang, Fuzhou, Guangzhou, Haikou, Hangzhou, Hefei, Hohhot, Hong Kong, Jiaxing, Kunming, Lanzhou, Lhasa, Nanchang, Nanjing, Ningbo, Panzhihua, Qamdo, Qingdao, Sanya, Shanghai–Hongqiao, Shanghai–Pudong, Shenzhen, Taipei-Taoyuan, Tianjin, Ürümqi, Wenzhou, Wuhan, Xiamen, Xining, Yangzhou, Yinchuan, Zhengzhou |
| Air Macau | Macau |
| Cathay Pacific | Hong Kong |
| Chengdu Airlines | Aksu, Beihai, Beijing–Daxing, Dazhou, Fuzhou, Guangzhou, Guyuan, Haikou, Hangzhou, Hohhot, Jieyang, Lanzhou, Lhasa, Nanjing, Ningbo, Quanzhou, Sanya, Shanghai–Hongqiao, Shanghai–Pudong, Shenyang, Shenzhen, Shijiazhuang, Taizhou, Tianjin, Turpan, Wenzhou, Wuhan, Xiamen, Xishuangbanna, Yichang, Yining, Zhongwei |
| China Airlines | Taipei-Taoyuan |
| China Eastern Airlines | Beijing–Daxing, Guangzhou, Hangzhou, Kunming, Shanghai–Hongqiao, Shanghai–Pudong |
| China Southern Airlines | Beijing–Daxing, Guangzhou, Shenzhen |
| EVA Air | Taipei-Taoyuan |
| Hong Kong Airlines | Hong Kong |
| Loong Air | Hangzhou, Jiaxing |
| Shenzhen Airlines | Shenzhen |
| Sichuan Airlines | Beijing–Capital, Changchun, Changsha, Changzhou,Daocheng, Fuzhou, Guangzhou, Haikou, Handan, Hangzhou, Harbin, Hefei, Hohhot, Hong Kong, Jinan, Kangding, Kashgar, Kunming, Lanzhou, Lhasa, Nanjing, Nanning, Ningbo, Nyingchi, Qingdao, Sanya, Shanghai–Pudong, Shenyang, Shenzhen, Taiyuan, Taipei-Taoyuan, Tianjin, Ürümqi, Wuhan, Wuxi, Xiamen, Xi'an, Xichang, Yangzhou, Yinchuan, Zhengzhou, Zhuhai |
| Xizang Airlines | Beihai, Beijing–Capital, Dali, Golmud, Golog, Hefei, Jinan, Kunming, Lhasa, Lijiang, Linyi, Mangshi, Nyingchi, Qamdo, Sanming, Sanya, Shanghai–Hongqiao, Shenzhen, Shigatse–Peace, Shijiazhuang, Taiyuan, Xiamen, Xichang, Xining, Xishuangbanna, Yancheng, Yichun (Jiangxi), Yushu |

=== Cargo ===
With the exception of Hong Kong, Macau, and Taiwan, all remaining international flights moved to new airport, with Shuangliu serving scheduled domestic and international cargo flights.

As of 2025, it operates cargo flights to East Asia, Southeast Asia, Europe, West Asia, North America and South Asia.

| Airlines | Destinations |
|---|---|
| Air China Cargo | Amsterdam, Anchorage, Liège, Stockholm–Arlanda, Shanghai–Pudong |
| AirZeta | Seoul–Incheon |
| Atlas Air | Anchorage, Seoul–Incheon |
| Geosky | Charter: Tbilisi |
| SF Airlines | Chennai, Delhi, Dhaka, Hangzhou, Mumbai |
| Sichuan Airlines Cargo | Almaty, Brussels, Budapest, Frankfurt, Helsinki, Prague, Moscow–Sheremetyevo, Malé, Singapore, Tel Aviv |

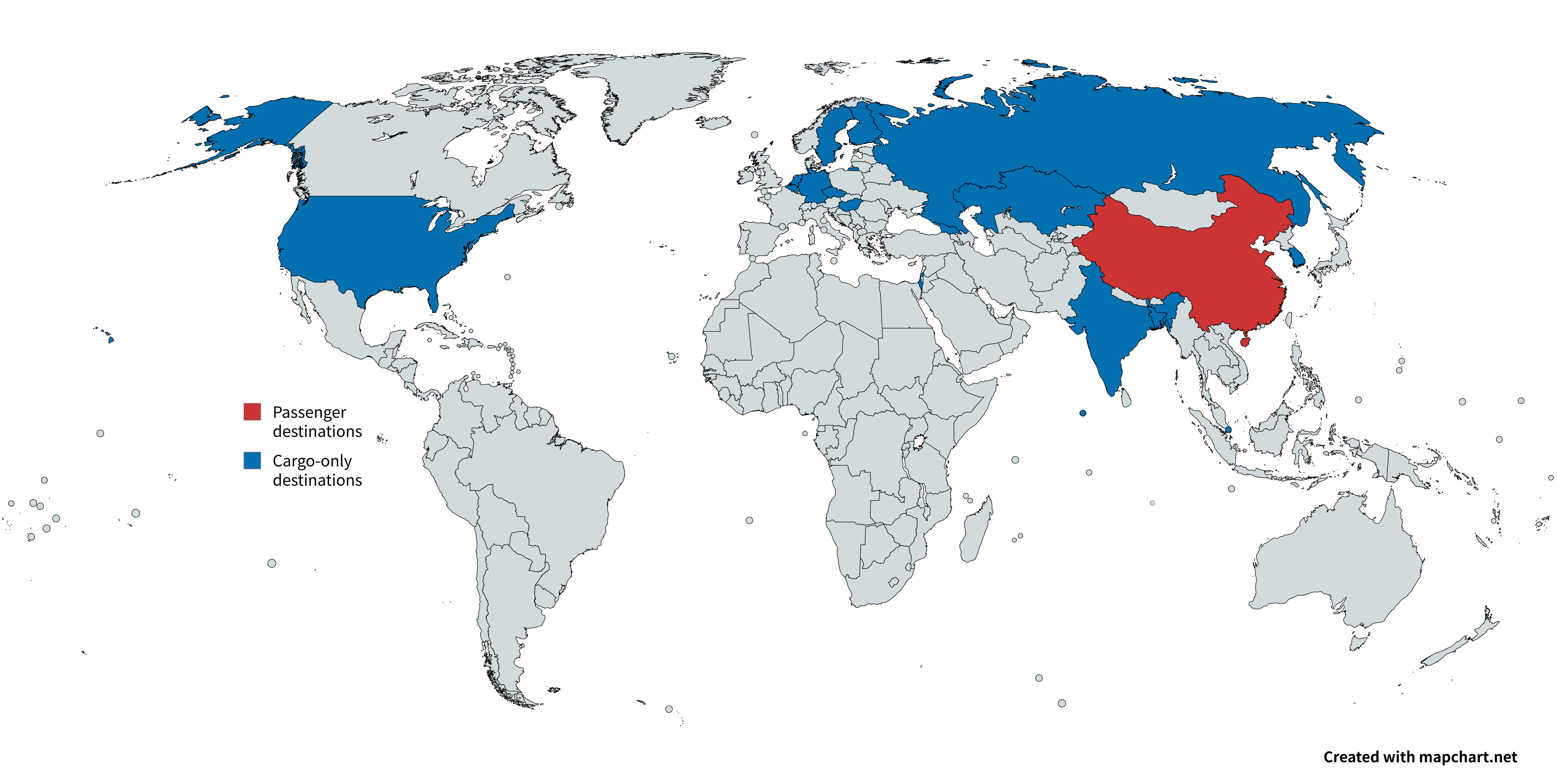
Red for passenger destinations, blue for cargo-only destinations. As of February 2026.

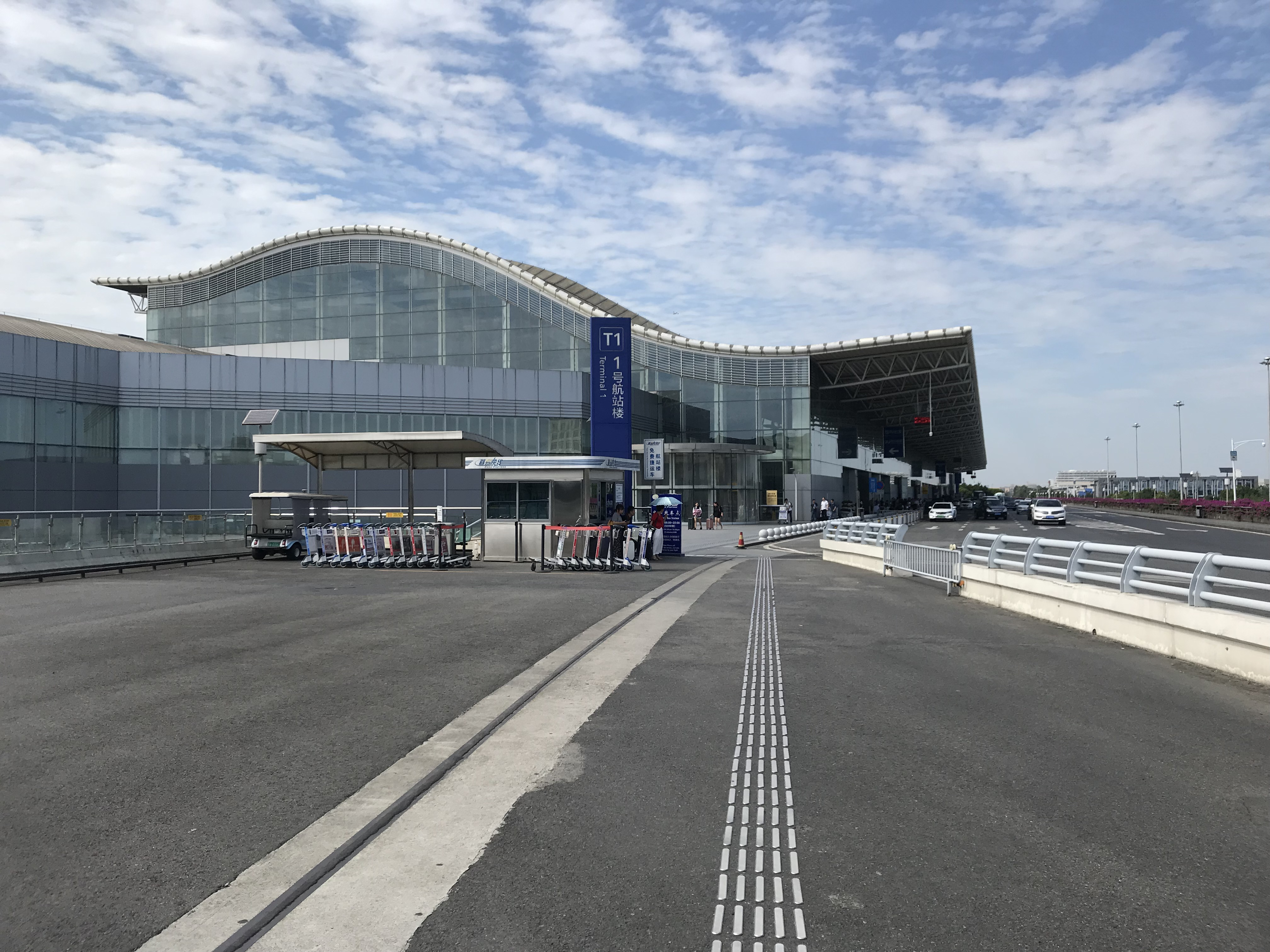
Terminal 1 of Chengdu Shuangliu International Airport in August 2019

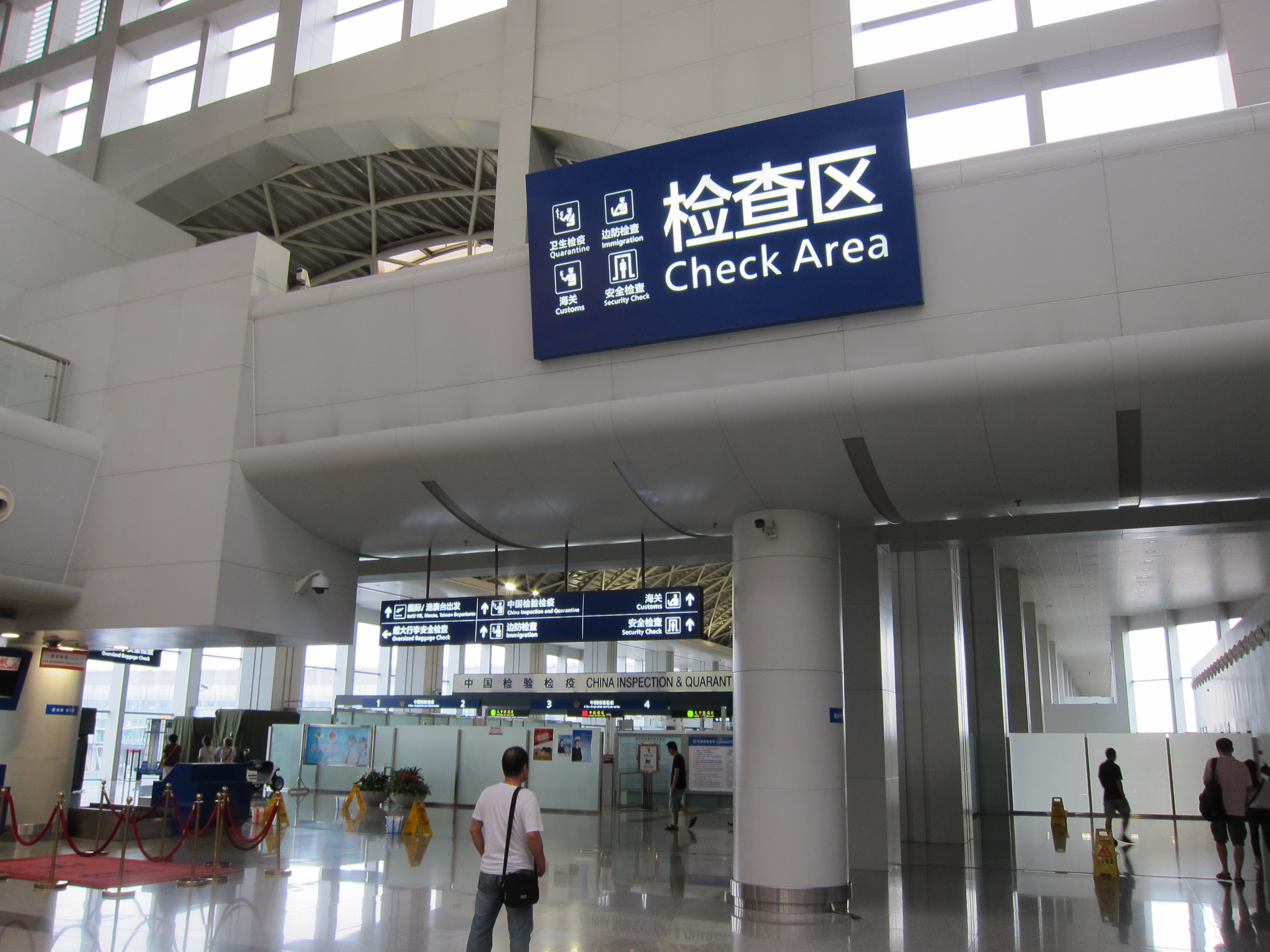
International departure hall

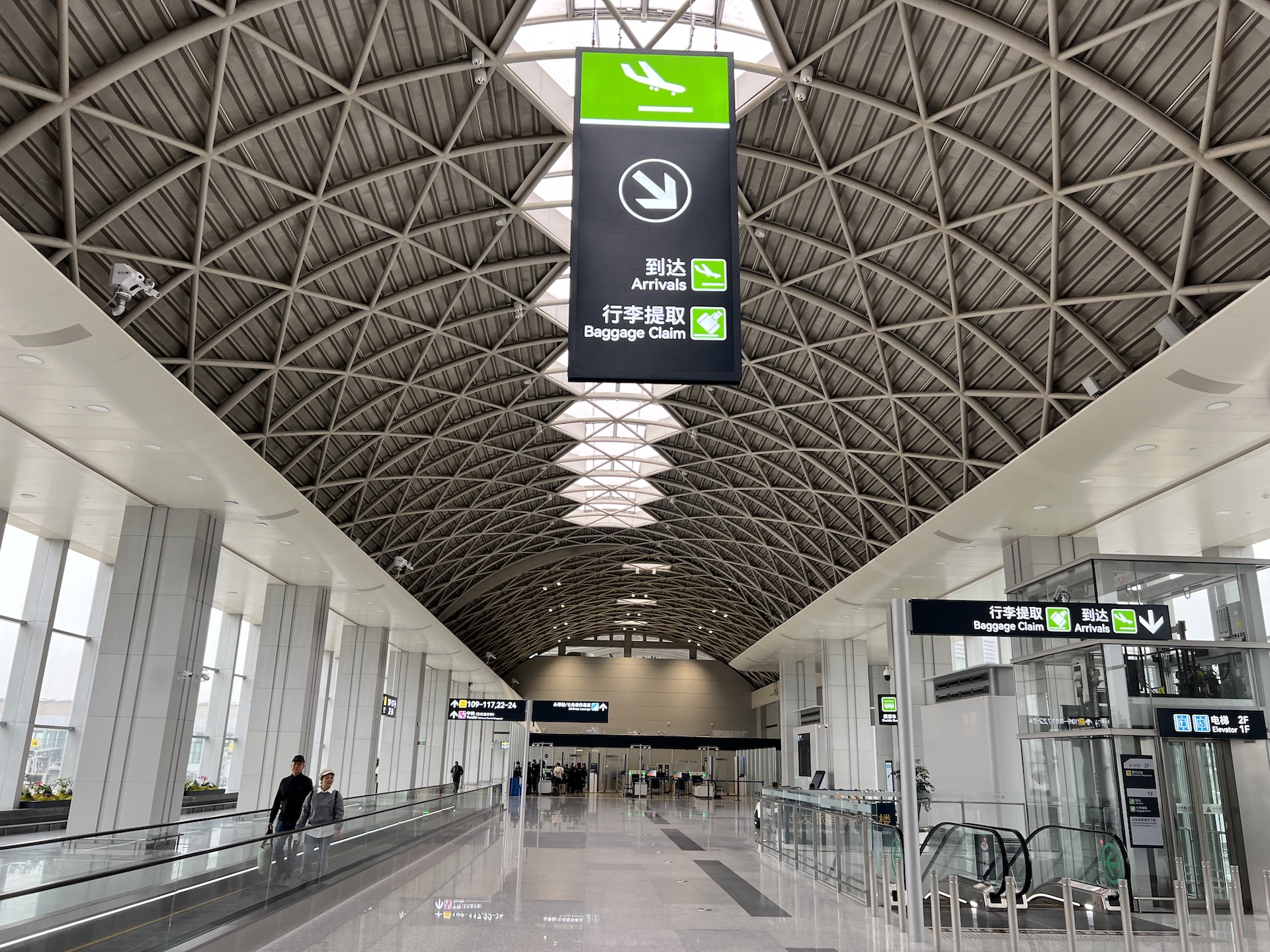
Mixed Flow of Arrivals and Departures at Terminal 1

== Other facilities ==
China Southwest Airlines once had its headquarters on the airport property.

== Ground transportation ==
=== Airport buses ===
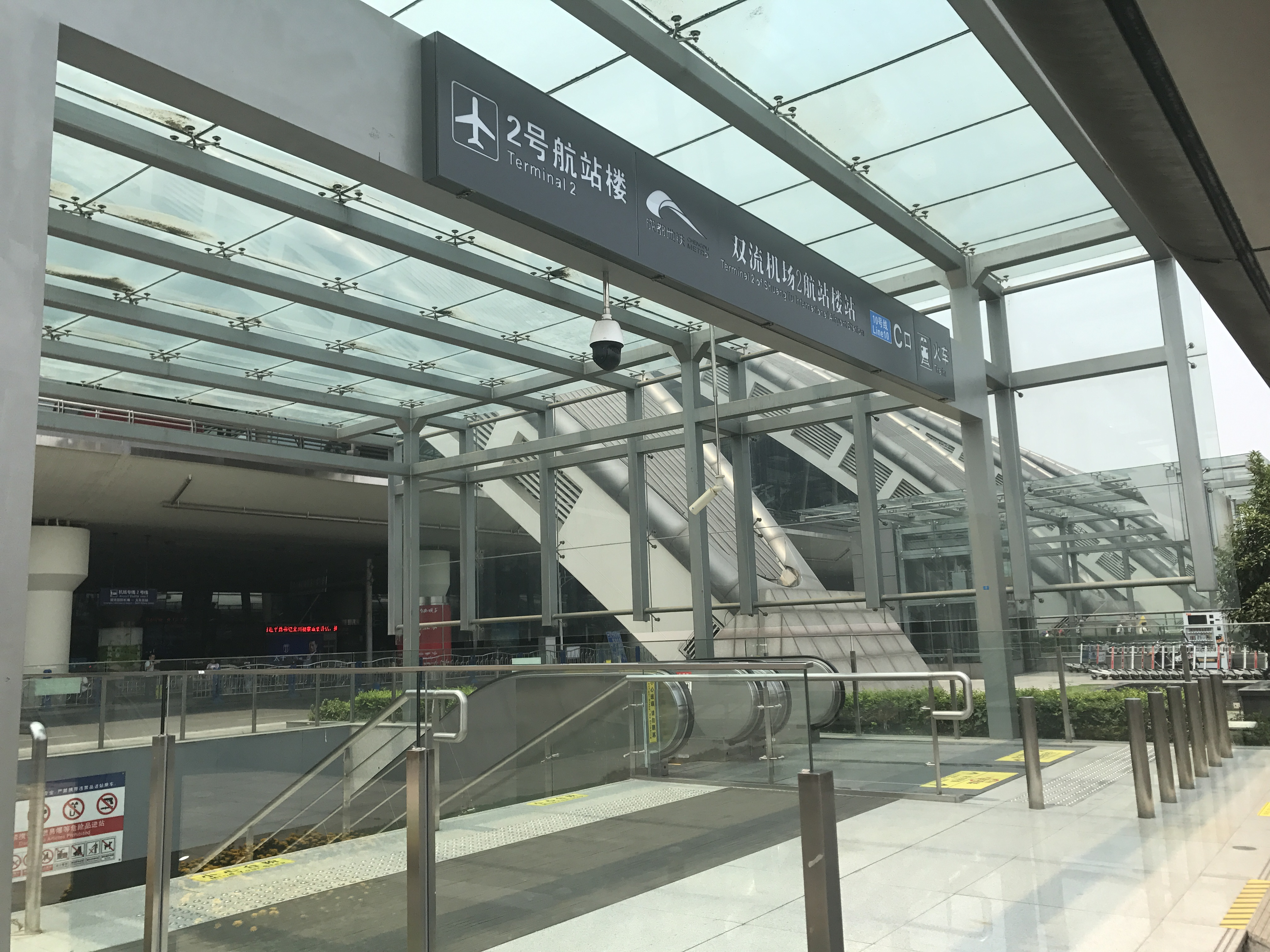
Entrance C of Terminal 2 of Shuangliu International Airport Station, Chengdu Metro

- Airport Bus No. 1, Chengdu Shuangliu International Airport – City Centre (Minshan Hotel, Section 2 of Renmin Road South, Metro station of Jinjiang Hotel).
- Airport Bus No. 2, Chengdu Shuangliu International Airport – Chengdu railway station (North Railway Station).
- Airport Bus No. 3, Chengdu Shuangliu International Airport – Chengdu East railway station (Chengdu Dong Railway Station).

=== High-speed train (CRH) ===
Passengers can take the CRH train at Shuangliu Airport railway station to Chengdu South railway station and Chengdu East railway station. The CRH trains at Shuangliu Airport railway station are also bound for Mianyang, Deyang, Meishan Dong (East), Leshan railway and Emeishan railway stations.

=== Metro ===
Two stations on Line 10 of the Chengdu Metro links Chengdu Shuangliu International Airport with Taipingyuan station. The stations are Terminal 1 of Shuangliu International Airport station and Terminal 2 of Shuangliu International Airport station which serves Terminals 1 and 2 respectively. It was opened on 6 September 2017.

== See also ==
- List of airports in China
