= GMQ =

GMQ or gmq may refer to:

- GMQ, the IATA code for Golog Maqin Airport, Qinghai, China
- gmq, the ISO 639-5 code for North Germanic languages, Northern Europe
