= Xi'an Xianyang International Airport =

Airport serving Xi'an, Shaanxi, China

Xi'an Xianyang International Airport 西安咸阳国际机场
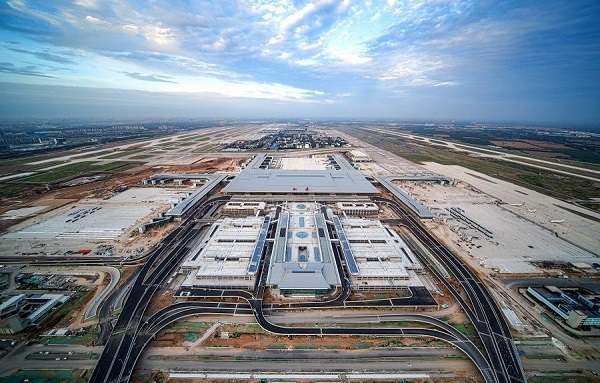
- IATA: XIY; ICAO: ZLXY

Summary
- Airport type: Public
- Owner/Operator: China West Airport Group
- Serves: Xi'an and Xianyang
- Location: Dizhang Subdistrict, Weicheng, Xianyang, Shaanxi, China
- Opened: 1 September 1991; 35 years ago
- Hub for: China Eastern Airlines; Hainan Airlines; Okay Airways; Tianjin Airlines
- Focus city for: Sichuan Airlines
- Operating base for: Air Changan
- Elevation AMSL: 479 m (1,572 ft)
- Coordinates: 34°26′16.1″N 108°45′23.6″E
- Website: Official website

Maps
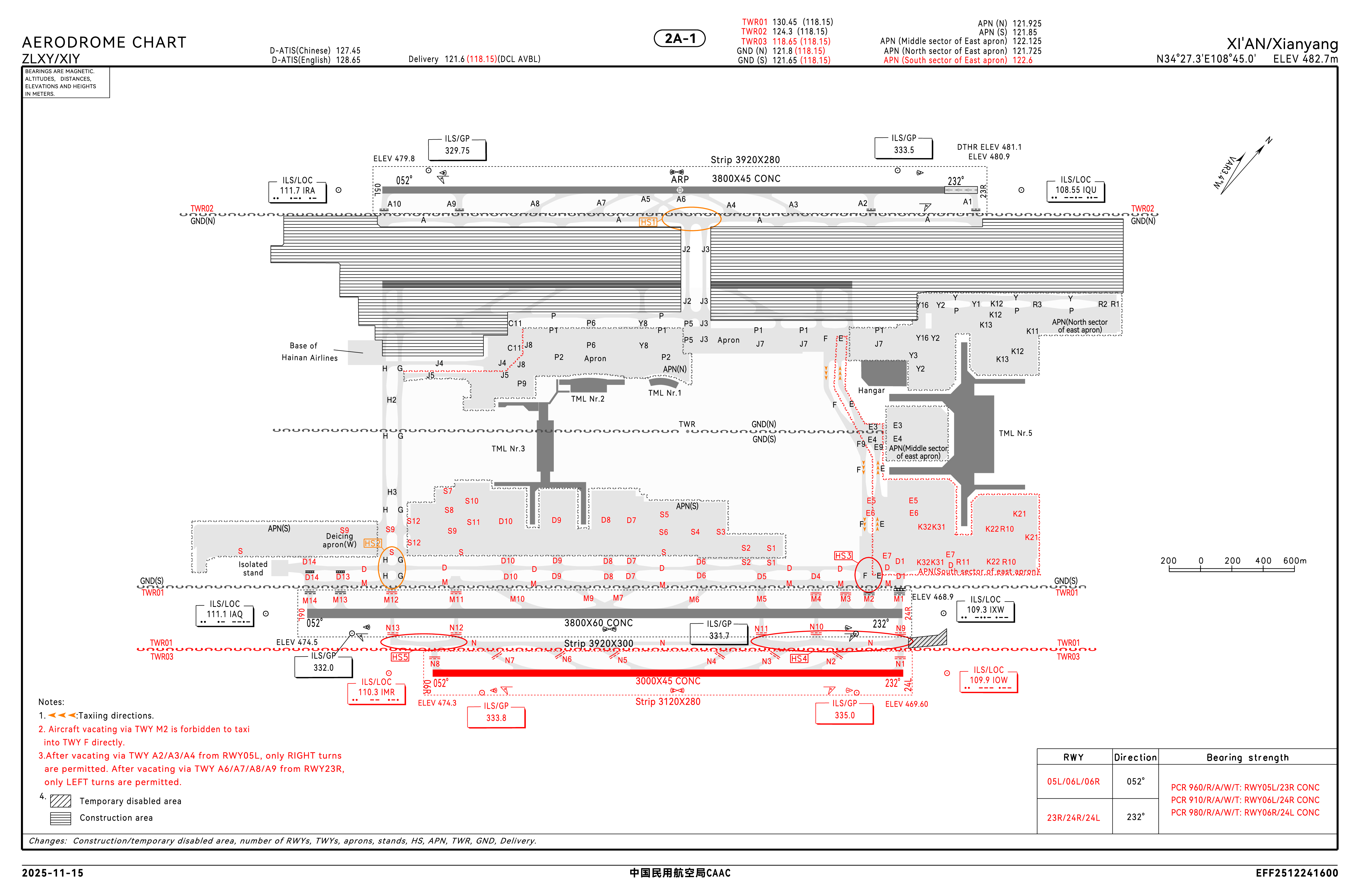
- CAAC airport chart

- Location of airport in China

Runways
Direction	Length		Surface
Direction	m	ft	Surface
05L/23R	3,000	9,843	Asphalt concrete
05R/23L	3,800	12,467	Concrete
06L/24R	3,800	12,467	Concrete
06R/23L	3,000	9,843	Concrete

Statistics (2025)
- Passengers: 48,535,594
- Cargo (in tons): 334,819.0
- Aircraft movements: 336,740
- Source: List of the busiest airports in China

Xi'an Xianyang International Airport
- Simplified Chinese: 西安咸阳国际机场
- Traditional Chinese: 西安咸陽國際機場
Transcriptions
Standard Mandarin
- Hanyu Pinyin: Xī'ān Xiányáng Guójì Jīchǎng

Xi'an Xianyang International Airport (IATA: XIY, ICAO: ZLXY) is an international airport serving the city of Xi'an, the capital of Northwest China's Shaanxi province, as well as the whole Guanzhong area. Covering an area of 12 square kilometres (4.6 sq mi), Xi'an Airport has four terminals: T1, T2, T3, and T5. The total terminal building area exceeds 1.1 million square meters, making it one of the largest passenger airports in China, it is also the largest airport in Northwest China, and the second largest airport in Northern China. The airport was the hub for China Northwest Airlines until the company was merged into China Eastern Airlines in 2002 and since then, China Eastern continues to operate as a hub at Xianyang. Xi'an Airport is also the hub for Sichuan Airlines and Hainan Airlines. Xi'an Xianyang International Airport is a Skytrax 4-star airport.

In 2025, the airport handled 48,535,594 passengers, making it the busiest airport in northwest China. It is the 11th busiest airport nationwide. Xi'an Xianyang International Airport was also the nation's 16th busiest airport in terms of cargo traffic and the 8th busiest airport by traffic movements.

== Location ==
The airport is located within the administrative area of Xianyang city, which gives the airport its name. It is 25 kilometres (16 mi) northwest of Xi'an city centre, and 13 kilometres (8.1 mi) northeast of the centre of Xianyang.

== History ==
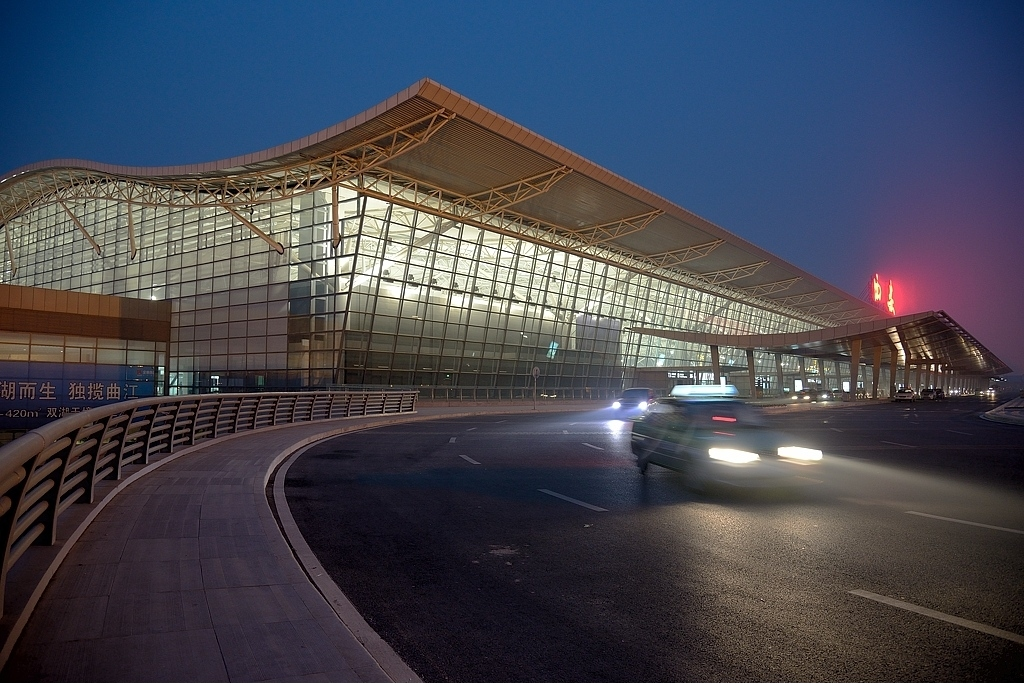
Airport Terminal

Before Xianyang Airport was built, Xi'an was served by Xi'an Xiguan Airport. In 1984, the State Council of China and the Central Military Commission proposed to build a large civil airport on the site of Xianyang's airfield. Phase 1 of the airport commenced construction in August 1987, and was finished and opened on 1 September 1991. Xi'an Xiguan Airport was closed at the same time. Phase 2 started in August 2000, and was finished on 16 September 2003. Another 7.592-billion-yuan project is scheduled to be completed by 2020.

Finnair's service to Helsinki was the first intercontinental route out of Xi'an, launching on 14 June 2013. However, due to the COVID-19 pandemic in China and the closure of Russian airspace resulting from the Russian invasion of Ukraine, the route has since been cancelled.

The airport is presently engaged in a three-phase expansion initiative, anticipated for completion in 2025, which would feature four runways and four terminals, establishing it as a significant domestic and international aviation transit hub. On 20 February 2025, Terminal 5 officially opened to public and will commence operation. China Eastern Airlines, Shanghai Airlines and China United Airlines, as well as all international flights, will from the same day relocate to this new terminal.

== Infrastructure ==
=== Terminal 1 ===
Terminal 1 is primarily used by 9 Air and Spring Airlines. The terminal reopened on 6 June 2017.

=== Terminal 2 ===
Terminal 2 opened in 2003 and is located 700 meters left of Terminal 3. T2 mainly serves domestic flights within China.

Terminal 2
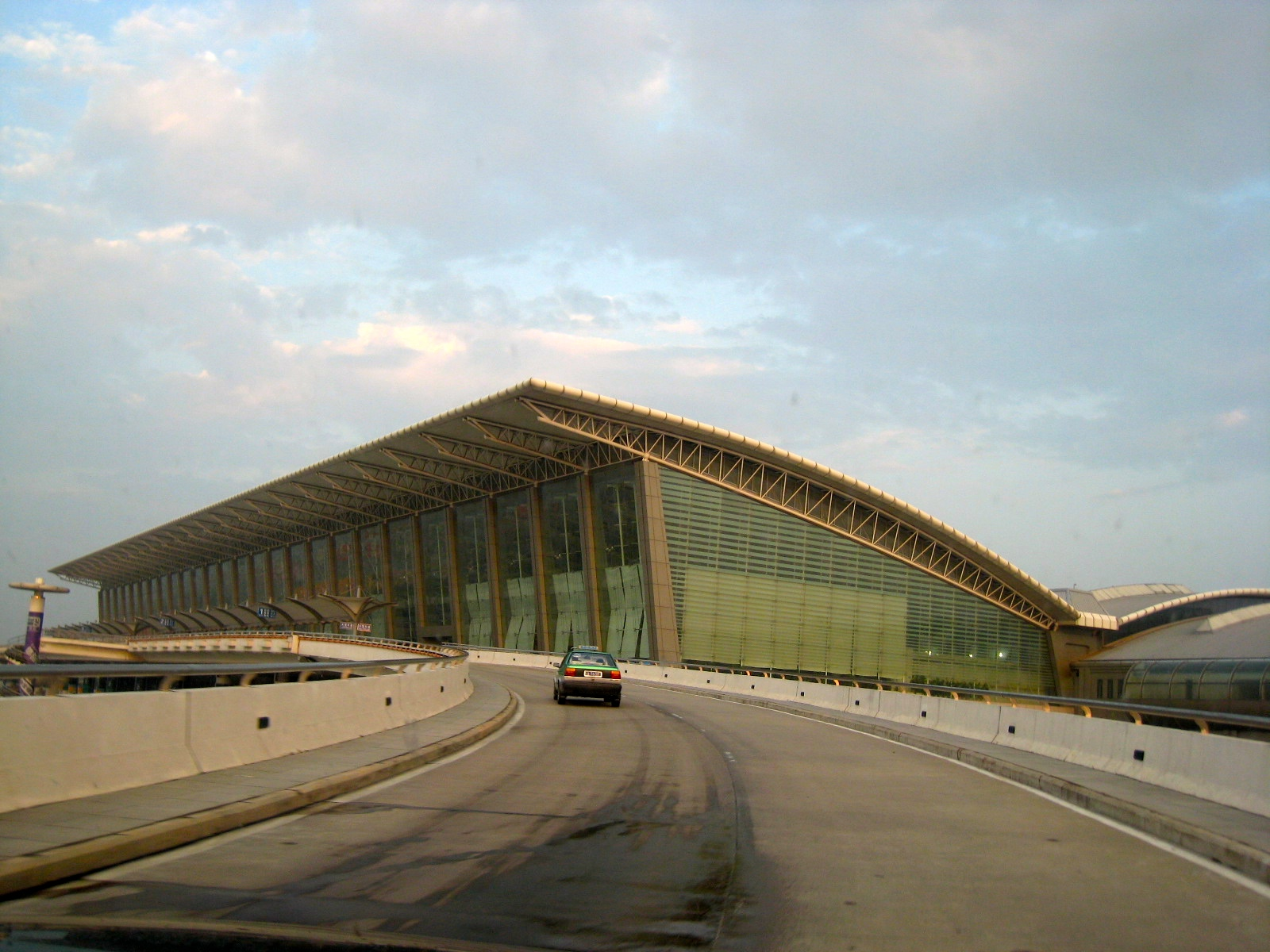
Exterior view

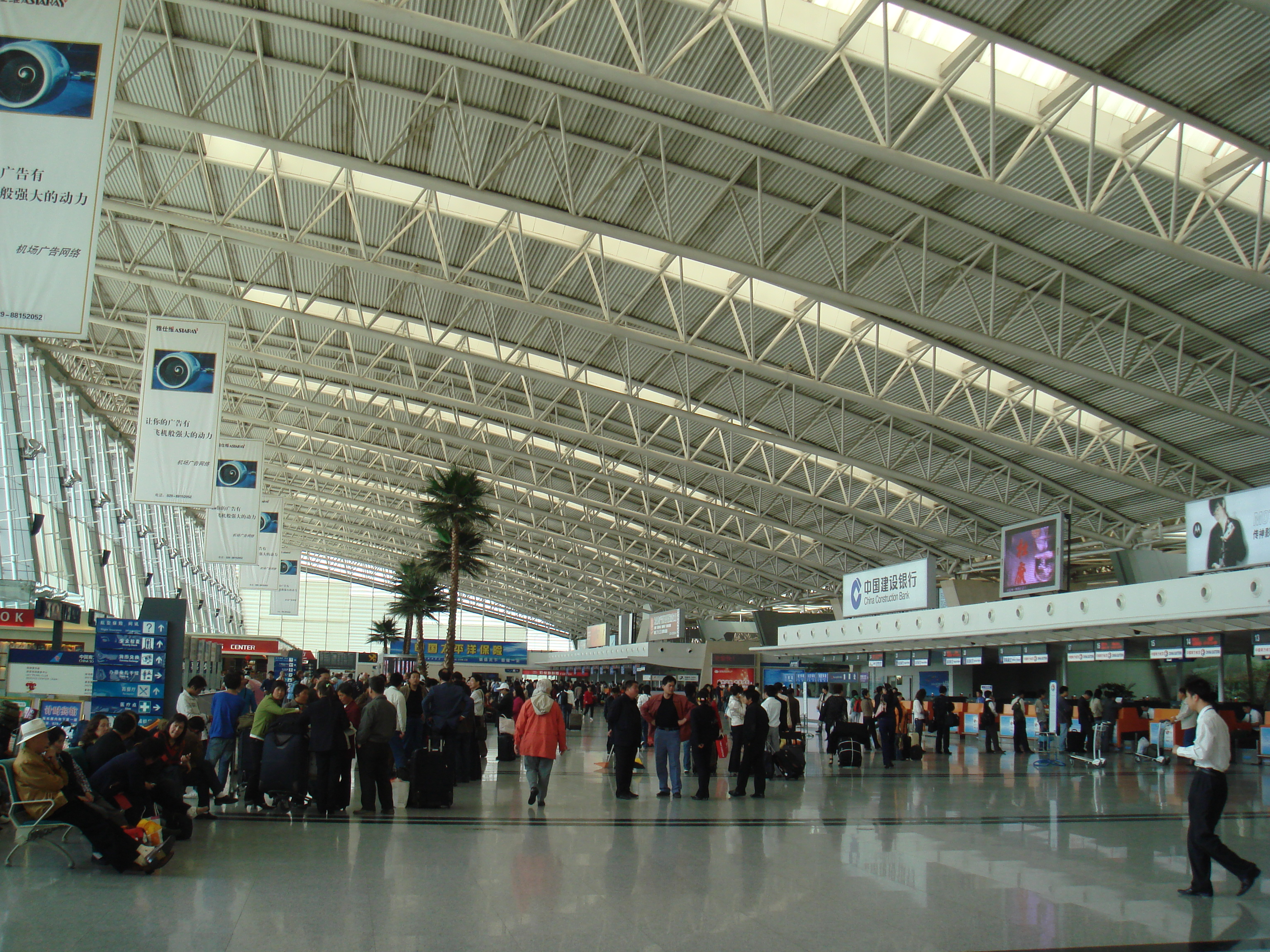
Interior view of Xi'an Xianyang International Airport Terminal 2

=== Terminal 3 and second runway ===
Terminal 3 and the second runway were opened on 3 May 2012, increasing the airport's capacity to more than 33 million passengers a year. The new terminal alone can handle 22 million passengers a year, twice as many as the other two terminals combined. Airlines that moved into the new terminal are China Eastern Airlines, China Southern Airlines, and Shanghai Airlines. The second runway is 3,800 meters long and is large enough to handle the Airbus A380.

Terminal 3
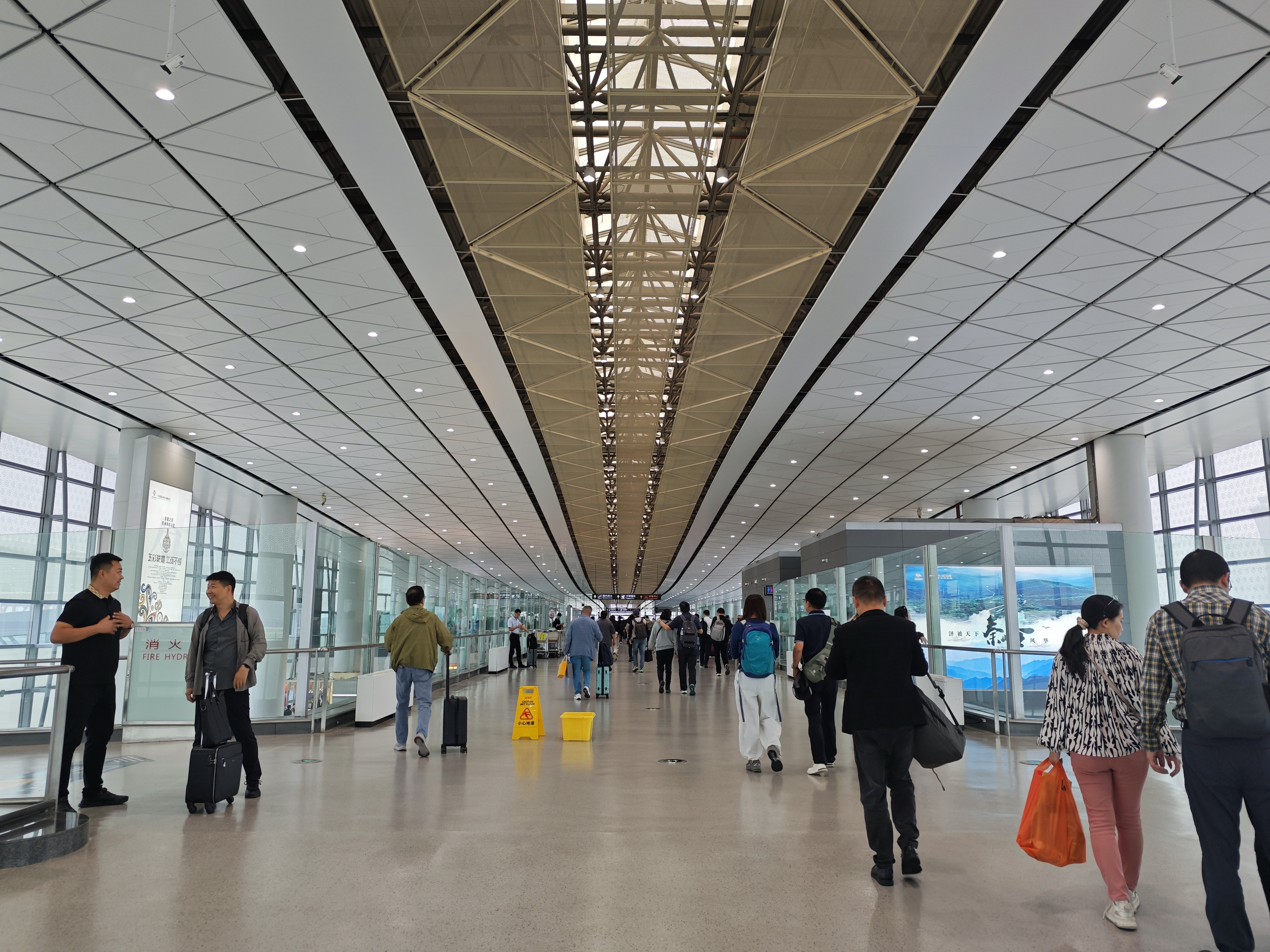
Departure concourse

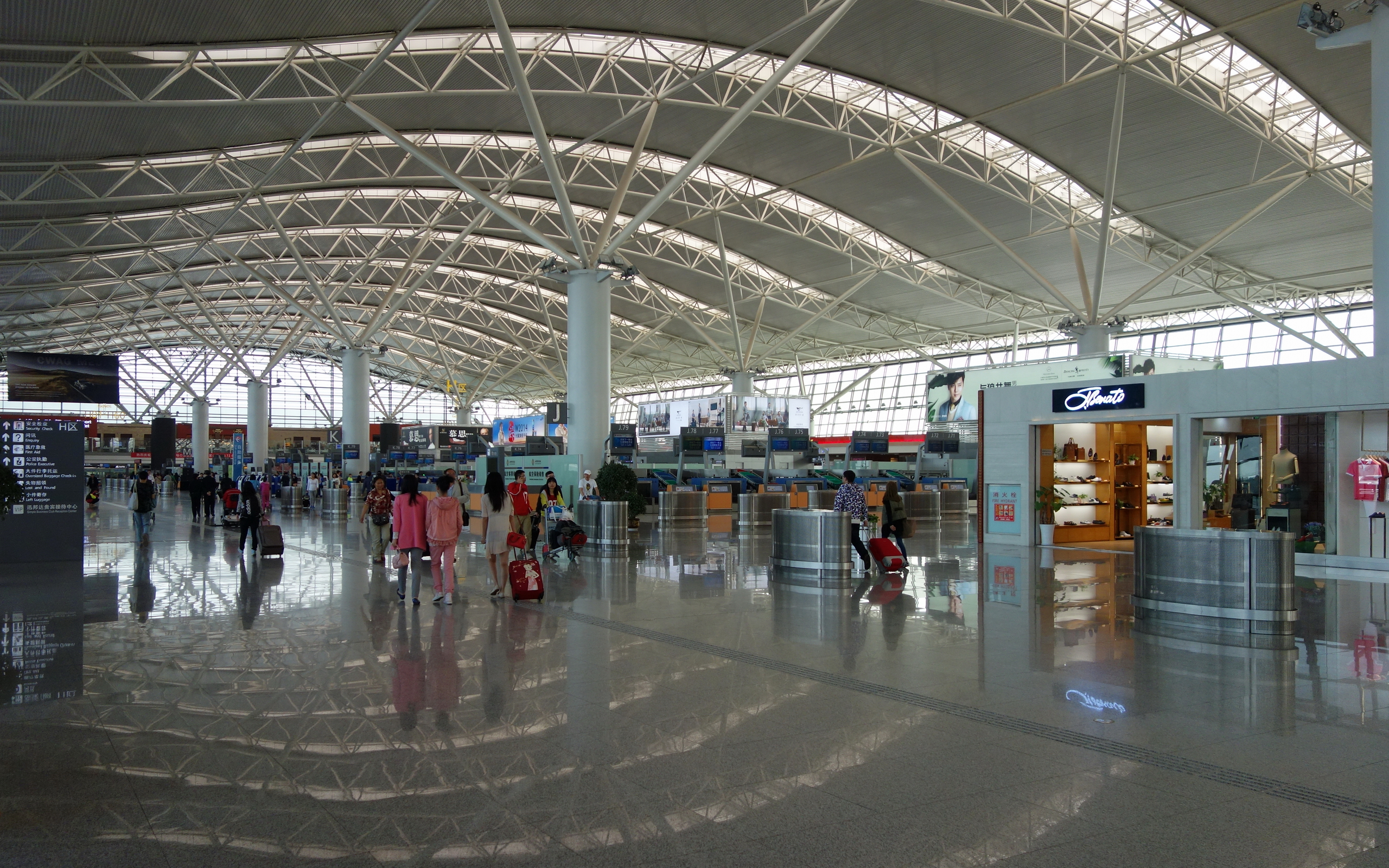
Terminal 3 departure hall

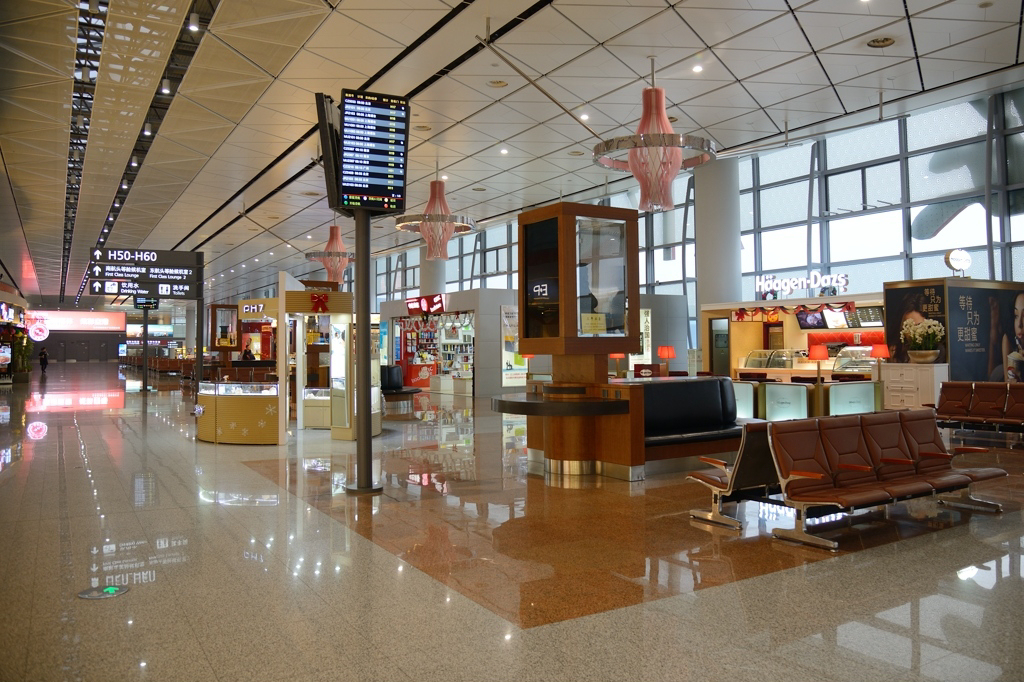
Waiting area

=== Terminal 5 and new runways ===
Construction of Terminal 5 began in July 2021 and was completed in September 2024, featuring Tang dynasty inspired architecture, with a total construction cost of 46.9 billion yuan ($6.47 billion). Safety inspections were carried out afterwards and were passed on 8 November. The terminal covers 705,500 square meters and added four new runaways and terminal for the airport.

Terminal 5
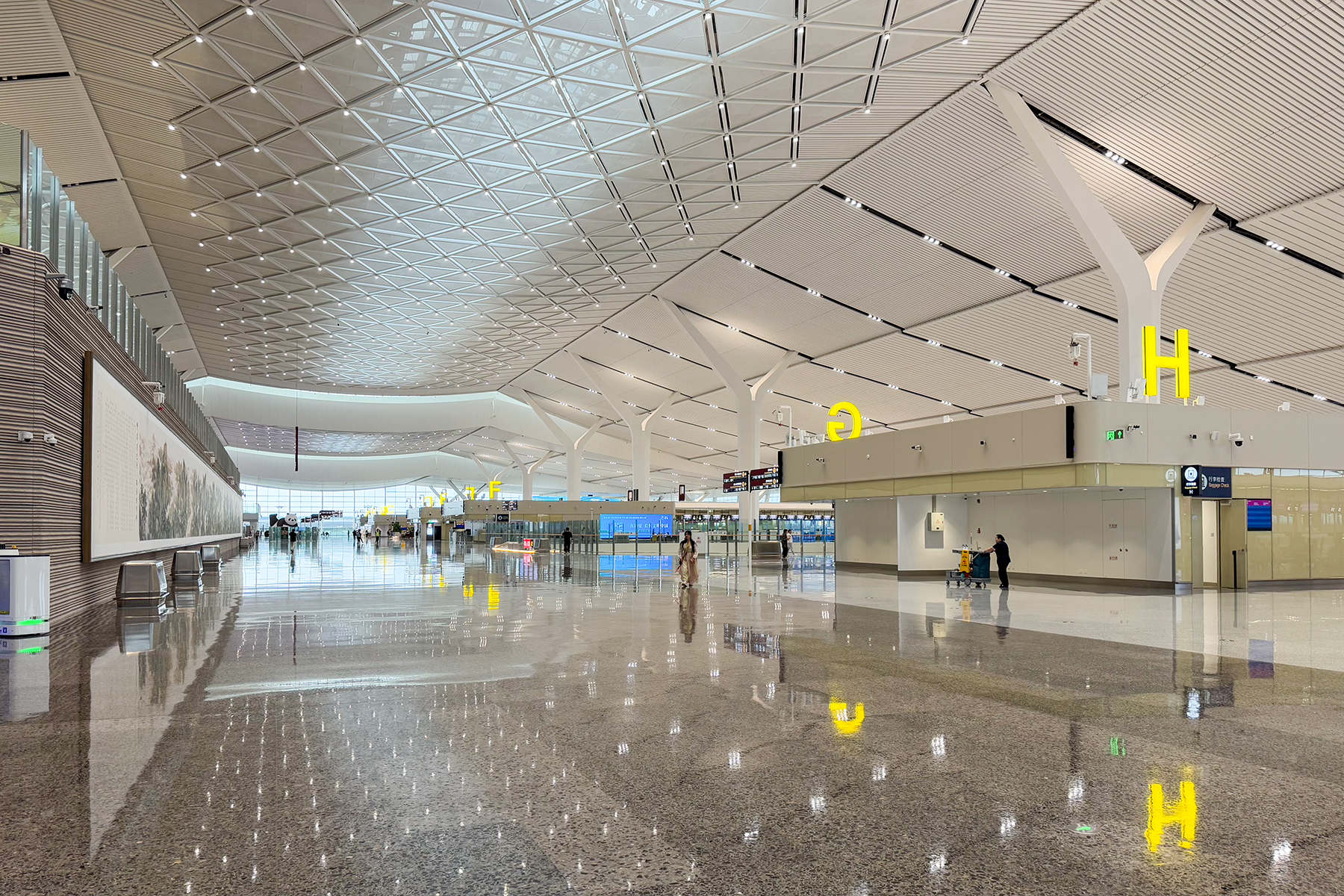
Terminal 5 interior

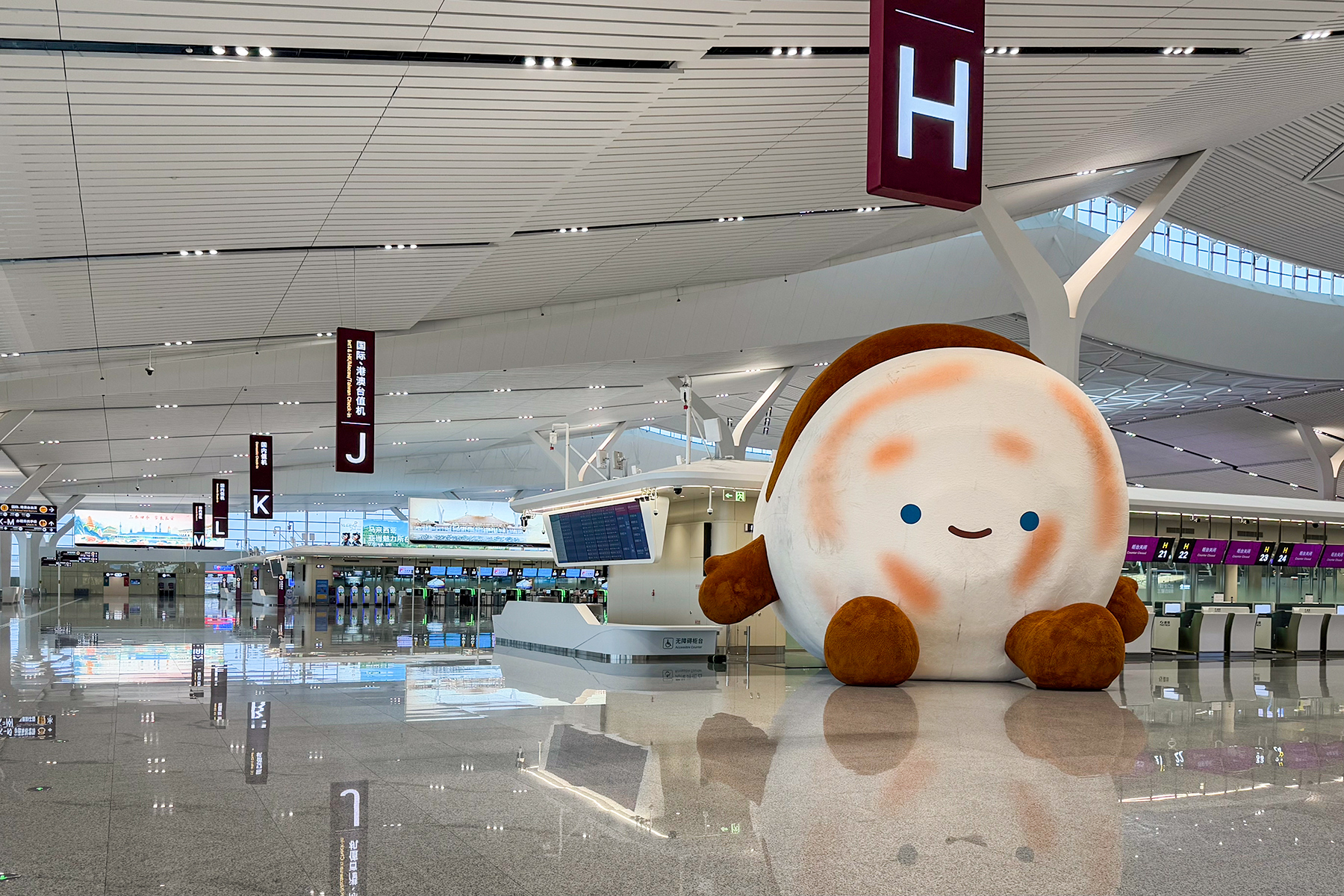
Terminal 5 interior

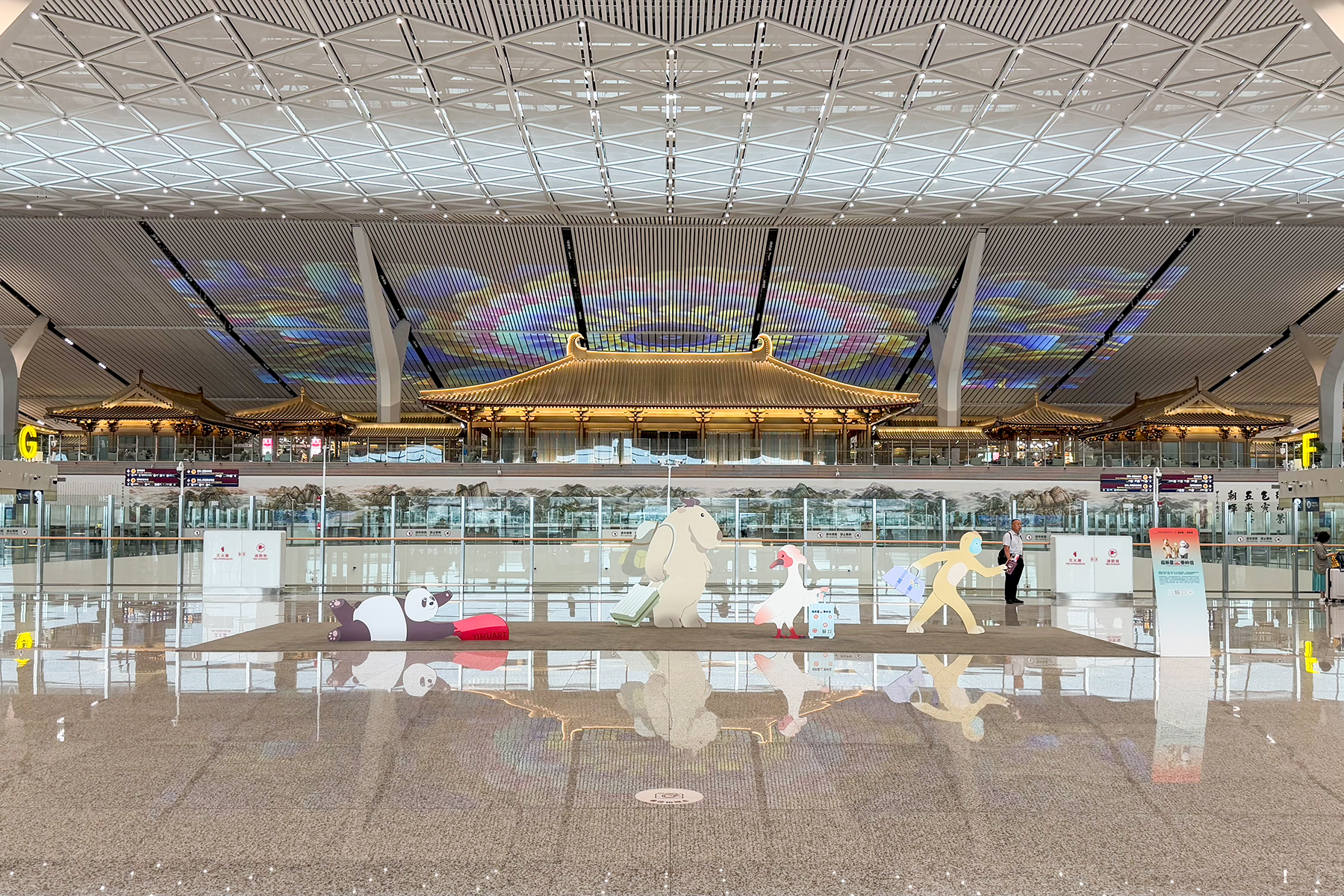
Tang-inspired architecture

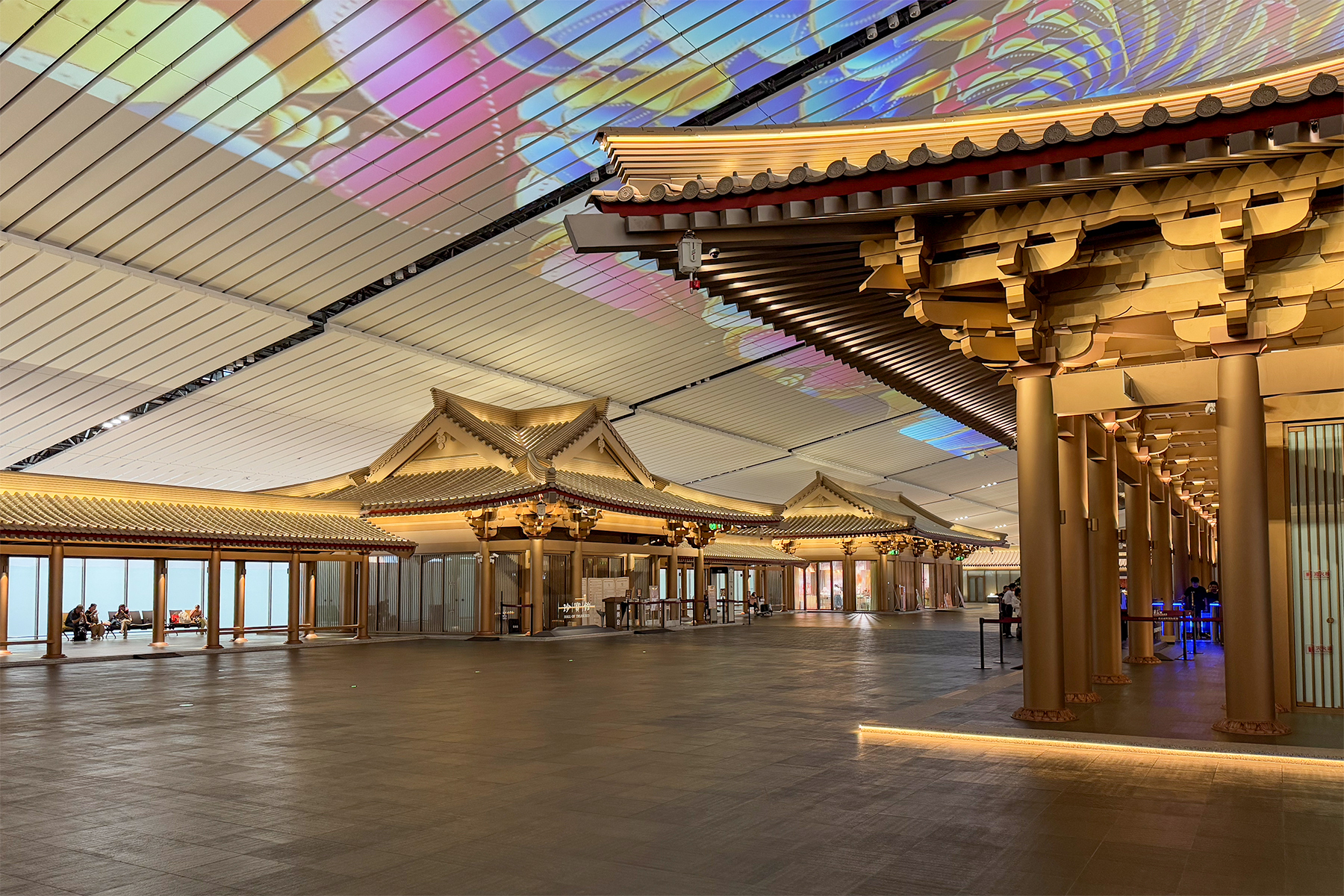
West Airport Museum

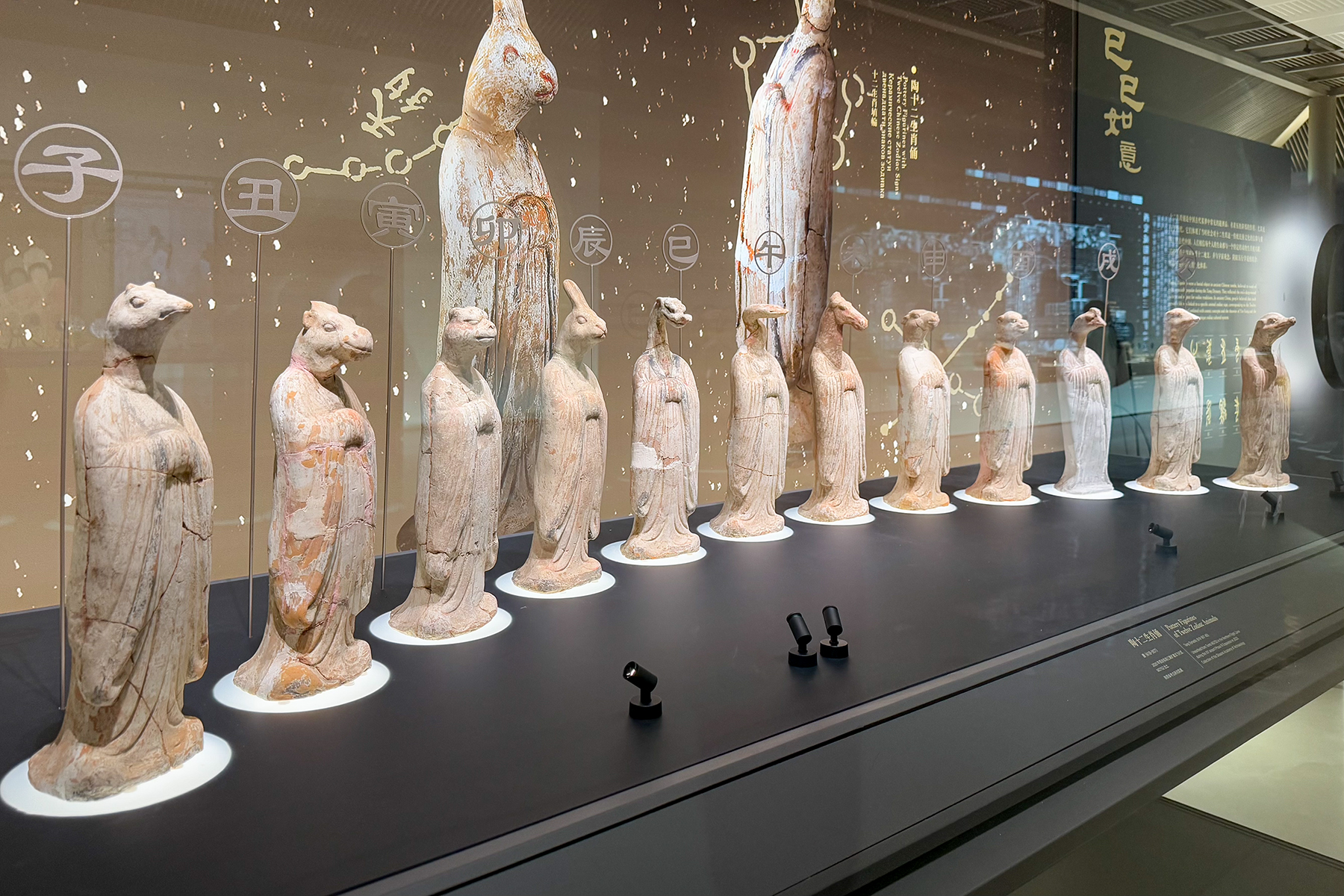
Pottery figurines at West Airport Museum

==== CWAG Museum of Heritage ====
The CWAG Museum of Heritage is a museum located within Terminal 5, opened on 26 February 2025. The museum contains 121 artifacts dating back to the Tang dynasty, that were uncovered during airport construction. Terracotta musicians sealed in tombs are also displayed at the museum. During its first month of operation, 45,000 visitors visited the museum.

== Airlines and destinations ==
=== Passenger ===
Airlines	Destinations
9 Air	Guangzhou, Tumxuk, Turpan, Vientiane
Air Busan	Busan
Air Chang'an	Bazhong, Beihai, Changchun, Dalian, Dunhuang, Ezhou, Guilin, Guiyang, Haikou, Hailar, Harbin, Huaihua, Huizhou, Jingdezhen, Jinggangshan, Kaili, Libo, Mudanjiang, Nanyang,, Ningbo Phuket, Qionghai, Sanya, Shenyang, Tangshan, Tongliao, Tongren, Wenzhou, Xiamen, Xinyang, Yichang, Yingkou, Yongzhou, Zhanjiang, Zhuhai
Air China	Astana, Beijing–Capital, Beijing–Daxing, Hangzhou, Hohhot, Minsk, Shanghai–Pudong, Tianjin, Wenzhou, Wuhan
Air Guilin	Guilin
AirAsia X	Kuala Lumpur–International
Asiana Airlines	Seoul–Incheon
Beijing Capital Airlines	Anshun, Changchun, Chenzhou, Enshi, Golmud, Guilin, Haikou, Hangzhou, Huangshan, Lijiang, Nanjing, Sanya, Shaoguan, Shijiazhuang, Xiamen, Xiangxi, Xining, Xishuangbanna, Yichun (Jiangxi), Yining, Yueyang
Cathay Pacific	Hong Kong
Chengdu Airlines	Barkol, Changsha, Qitai
China Eastern Airlines	Aksu, Altay, Beijing–Daxing, Changchun, Changsha, Changzhou, Chongqing, Dali, Dalian, Dongying, Dubai–International, Dunhuang, Fuzhou, Golmud, Guangzhou, Guilin, Guiyang, Haikou, Hangzhou, Hanoi, Harbin, Hefei, Hohhot, Hong Kong, Hotan, Huai'an, Istanbul, Jiayuguan, Jieyang, Jiaxing, Jinan, Jinchang, Karamay, Kashgar, Kunming, Kuqa, Lhasa, Melbourne, Milan–Malpensa, Moscow–Sheremetyevo, Nagoya–Centrair, Nanchang, Nanjing, Ningbo, Ordos, Phu Quoc, Phuket, Qingdao, Quanzhou, Sanya, Seoul–Incheon, Shache, Shanghai–Hongqiao, Shanghai–Pudong, Shenyang, Shenzhen, Shigatse–Peace, Singapore, Sydney, Tacheng, Tashkent, Tianjin, Ürümqi, Vienna, Weihai, Wenzhou, Wuhan, Wuxi, Xiamen, Xining, Yantai, Yining, Yinchuan, Yiwu, Yulin (Shaanxi), Zhangjiajie, Zhanjiang, Zhangye, Zhuhai
China Express Airlines	Baotou, Changchun, Chifeng, Harbin, Jieyang, Luliang, Nanjing, Qinhuangdao, Quzhou, Sanya, Ulanqab, Xiamen, Xiangyang, Xilinhot, Xishuangbanna, Yan'an, Yulin (Shaanxi), Zhangjiajie
China Southern Airlines	Almaty, Ashgabat, Beijing–Daxing, Changchun, Changsha, Chengdu–Tianfu, Chongqing, Dalian, Daqing, Doha, Dushanbe, Guangzhou, Harbin, Hotan, Nanning, Sanya, Shenyang, Shenzhen, Ürümqi, Wuhan, Yining, Yiwu, Zhuhai
China United Airlines	Wenzhou
Colorful Guizhou Airlines	Guiyang, Xingyi
Dalian Airlines	Beijing–Capital
Donghai Airlines	Jingzhou, Shenzhen
FlyArystan	Almaty
Fuzhou Airlines	Dunhuang, Fuzhou, Guiyang, Tianjin, Zhangjiajie
GX Airlines	Nanning, Yulin (Shaanxi)
Hainan Airlines	Beijing–Capital, Changsha, Chongqing, Dalian, Fuzhou, Guangzhou, Guiyang, Haikou, Hangzhou, Harbin, Kunming, Liuzhou, Nanjing, Nanning, Paris–Charles de Gaulle, Qianjiang, Qingdao, Sanya, Shanghai–Pudong, Shaoyang, Shenyang, Shenzhen, Ürümqi, Vladivostok, Xiamen, Xining, Zhuhai
Hong Kong Airlines	Seasonal: Hong Kong
Jeju Air	Jeju
Jiangxi Air	Nanchang, Ürümqi
Jin Air	Seasonal: Jeju
Juneyao Air	Guiyang, Guyuan, Haikou, Huizhou, Nanjing, Shanghai–Hongqiao, Shanghai–Pudong, Vientiane, Yulin (Shaanxi), Zhongwei
Korean Air	Seoul–Incheon
Kunming Airlines	Kunming, Tengchong
Loong Air	Bangkok–Suvarnabhumi, Baotou, Bishkek, Changzhou, Chifeng, Dushanbe, Enshi, Hangzhou, Harbin, Kashgar, Korla, Ningbo, Penang, Samarqand, Tashkent, Weihai, Wenzhou, Yangyang
Lucky Air	Kunming, Lijiang, Xishuangbanna
Okay Airways	Changsha, Jiujiang, Nanchang, Ningbo, Shenzhen, Tianjin
Ruili Airlines	Hohhot, Kunming, Shenyang
S7 Airlines	Novosibirsk
SCAT Airlines	Şymkent
Scoot	Singapore
Shandong Airlines	Aksu, Guiyang, Jinan, Korla, Longnan, Qingdao, Wuyishan, Xiamen, Yantai, Zhuhai
Shanghai Airlines	Budapest, Shanghai–Hongqiao, Wenzhou
Shenzhen Airlines	Guangzhou, Hefei, Huizhou, Linyi, Nanjing, Nanning, Nantong, Quanzhou, Shenyang, Shenzhen, Wenzhou, Wuxi, Xining, Yangzhou, Yantai
Sichuan Airlines	Beihai, Changchun, Chengdu–Shuangliu, Chiang Mai, Chongqing, Diqing, Gannan, Guiyang, Haikou, Harbin, Kunming, Lhasa, Luzhou, Nyingchi, Panzhihua, Qingdao, Sanya, Shanghai–Pudong, Shenyang, Shenzhen, Ürümqi, Xichang, Xishuangbanna, Yibin, Yingkou, Zhangjiajie, Zhuhai
Spring Airlines	Bangkok–Don Mueang, Bangkok–Suvarnabhumi, Chiang Mai, Fuyang, Jieyang, Nanchang, Ningbo, Phnom Penh, Shanghai–Hongqiao, Shanghai–Pudong, Shenyang, Shenzhen, Tonghua, Ürümqi, Yining,
Thai AirAsia	Bangkok–Don Mueang
Thai Lion Air	Bangkok–Don Mueang
Tianjin Airlines	Baotou, Changde, Changsha, Chifeng, Chizhou, Chongqing, Dandong, Ganzhou, Guilin, Guiyang, Haikou, Hailar, Hami, Hangzhou, Harbin, Hengyang, Hohhot, Huaihua, Huizhou, Korla, Kunming, London–Heathrow, Quanzhou, Sanya, Shangrao, Shiyan, Taizhou, Tianjin, Ulanhot, Ulanqab, Ürümqi, Wuhai, Xiamen, Xiangxi, Yancheng, Yantai, Yueyang, Yulin (Guangxi), Yulin (Shaanxi), Zhuhai, Zunyi–Maotai, Zunyi–Xinzhou
Turkish Airlines	Istanbul
VietJet Air	Hanoi, Ho Chi Minh City
XiamenAir	Changsha, Fuzhou, Guyuan, Hangzhou, Quanzhou, Tianjin, Xiamen
Xizang Airlines	Changchun, Dali, Hangzhou, Kunming, Lhasa, Lijiang, Nanjing, Nantong, Nyingchi, Pu'er, Qamdo, Shenzhen, Xining, Xishuangbanna, Yushu, Zhaotong

=== Cargo ===
Airlines	Destinations
China Postal Airlines	Seoul–Incheon
Geosky	Tbilisi
Korean Air Cargo	Seoul–Incheon
SF Airlines	Tokyo–Narita
YTO Cargo Airlines	Almaty, Tashkent

== Ground transportation ==
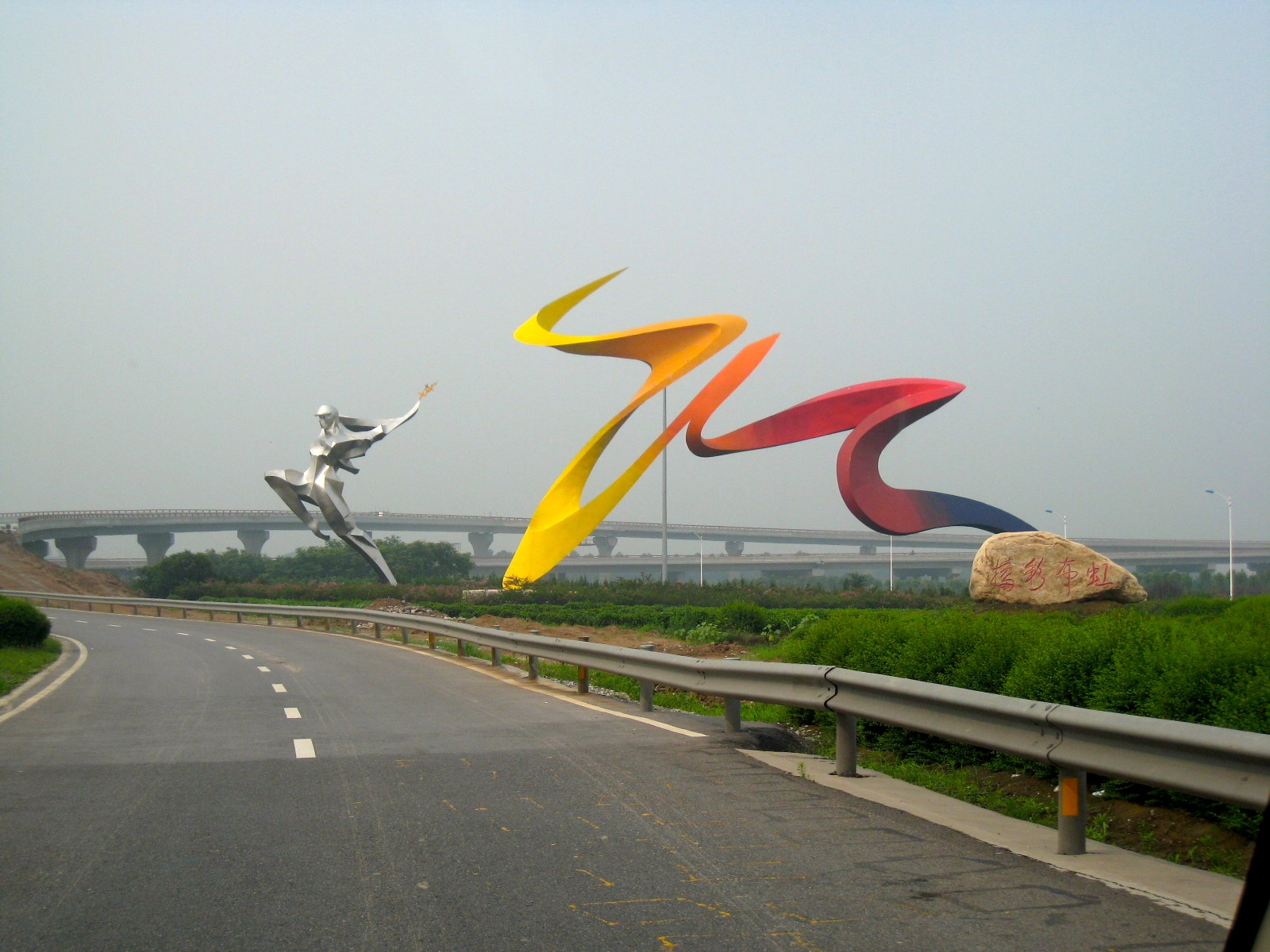
Figures along the Airport Express highway leading to Xi'an Xianyang International Airport

Eight airport bus routes connect the airport well with the Xi'an and Xianyang city.

There are also long-distance buses which connect the airport with Baoji, Yangling, Lintong, Hancheng, Hanzhong, Weinan, Tongchuan, Yan'an, Qingyang, and Pingliang.

Xi'an Metro Line 14 between Xi'an Beizhan station and the airport was opened on 29 September 2019. The line extended to Heshao station on 29 June 2021. The airport is served by two stations; Airport W. (T1, T2, T3) station serves terminals 1, 2 and 3, and Airport (T5) station serves terminal 5.

== Accidents and incidents ==
- On 6 June 1994, China Northwest Airlines Flight 2303 broke up in mid-air and crashed near Xi'an, en route to Guangzhou from Xi'an. A maintenance error was responsible. All 160 people on board died.

== See also ==
- Xi'an Xiguan Airport
- List of airports in China
- List of the busiest airports in China
