= Golmud Airport =

Golmud Airport 格尔木机场
- IATA: GOQ; ICAO: ZLGM

Summary
- Airport type: Public/military
- Serves: Golmud, Qinghai, China
- Elevation AMSL: 2,842 m (9,324 ft)
- Coordinates: 36°24′02″N 94°47′10″E
- Website: geermu.cwag.com

Map
- Location of airport in Qinghai

Runways
Direction	Length		Surface
Direction	m	ft	Surface
09/27	4,800	15,748	concrete

Statistics (2025)
- Passengers: 362,343
- Aircraft movements: 3,946
- Cargo (metric tons): 1,335.7

Golmud Airport
- Simplified Chinese: 格尔木机场
- Traditional Chinese: 格爾木機場
Transcriptions
Standard Mandarin
- Hanyu Pinyin: Gé'ěrmù Jīchǎng

Golmud Airport (IATA: GOQ, ICAO: ZLGM) is a dual-use military and civil airport serving Golmud, Qinghai province, China.

Golmud Airport ranked 138 out of China's 166 civil airports by passenger volume in 2009. In that year, it served 38,479 passengers, an 82% increase over 2008.

== History ==
Construction of Golmud Airport began in 1966 with an investment of 31.4619 million yuan from the Ministry of National Defense, and it was completed in August 1971.

In 1974, the State Council and the Central Military Commission approved the construction of civilian facilities at the airport. In August of the same year, the Civil Aviation Golmud Station was established, and it officially opened for operation in November.

On September 16, 1985, scheduled flights were cancelled and the airport was shut down due to a shortage of spare parts for the Ilyushin Il-18 aircraft. On March 15, 1996, Golmud Airport resumed operations after being out of service for more than 10 years.

In July 1997, Golmud Airport was shut down again due to the retirement of the Tu-154 passenger plane and the lack of suitable aircraft for high-altitude flights. On November 28, 2000, Shandong Airlines launched the Golmud-Xining-Qingdao route using CRJ aircraft, and Golmud Airport resumed operations again after being out of service for more than 3 years.

On July 29, 2015, the feasibility study report for the expansion and renovation of Golmud Airport was approved by the National Development and Reform Commission. The project was designed to meet the target of 750,000 passenger trips and 2,250 tons of cargo throughput by 2025. In March 2016, the construction project commenced. In September 2017, the project was completed and put into operation. The total investment was 430 million yuan.

In 2025, the actual passenger throughput was 362,343 and the cargo throughput was 1,335.7 metric tons, both of which were far below the targets set in 2015.

== Airlines and destinations ==
Airlines	Destinations
Beijing Capital Airlines	Xi'an, Xining
China Eastern Airlines	Xi'an, Xining
Tibet Airlines	Chengdu–Shuangliu, Xining
West Air	Lhasa, Zhengzhou

== See also ==
- List of airports in China
- List of highest airports
