= Guyuan Liupanshan Airport =

Guyuan Liupanshan Airport 固原六盘山机场
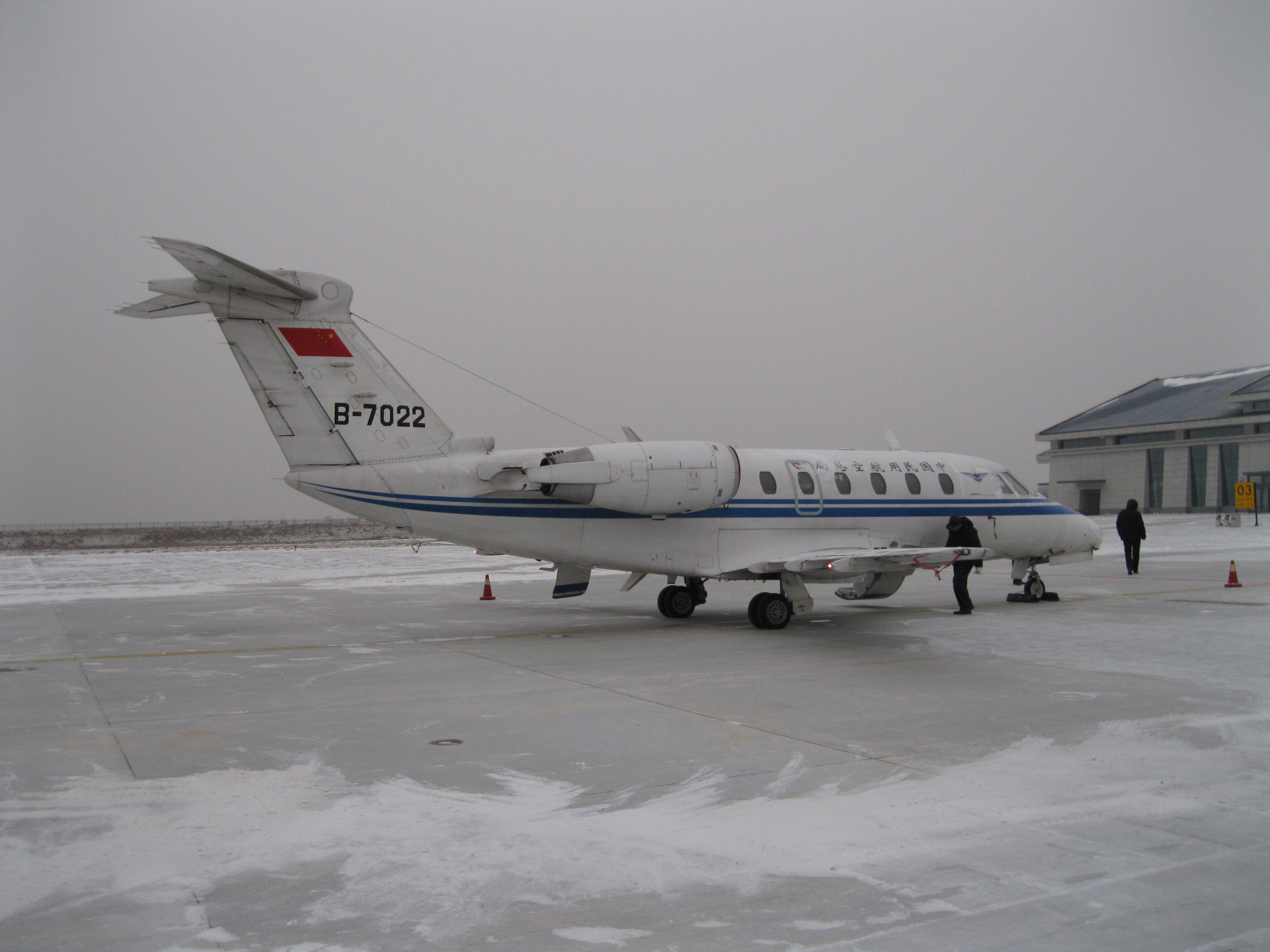
- A CAAC Cessna Citation at Guyuan Airport
- IATA: GYU; ICAO: ZLGY

Summary
- Airport type: Public
- Operator: China West Airport Group
- Serves: Guyuan, Ningxia, China
- Location: Zhonghe Township
- Opened: 26 June 2010
- Elevation AMSL: 1,745.6 m / 5,727 ft
- Coordinates: 36°04′34″N 106°13′05″E
- Website: guyuan.cwag.com westaport.com (archived)

Map
- Location of airport in Ningxia

Runways
Direction	Length		Surface
Direction	m	ft	Surface
18/36	2,800	9,186

Statistics (2021)
- Passengers: 182,860
- Aircraft movements: 13,606
- Cargo (metric tons): 12.6

Guyuan Liupanshan Airport
- Simplified Chinese: 固原六盘山机场
- Traditional Chinese: 固原六盤山機場
Transcriptions
Standard Mandarin
- Hanyu Pinyin: Gùyuán Liùpánshān Jīchǎng

Guyuan Liupanshan Airport (IATA: GYU, ICAO: ZLGY) is an airport serving Guyuan, a city in Ningxia Hui Autonomous Region, China. It is located in Zhonghe Township, 8.5 kilometres (5.3 mi) from the city center. The airport cost 458 million yuan to build and started operation on 26 June 2010.

== Airlines and destinations ==
Airlines	Destinations
Chengdu Airlines	Chengdu–Shuangliu, Shijiazhuang
Hebei Airlines	Beijing–Daxing, Yinchuan
Juneyao Air	Shanghai–Pudong, Xi'an
XiamenAir	Fuzhou, Xi'an

== See also ==
- List of airports in China
- List of the busiest airports in China
