= Ulanqab Jining Airport =

Airport in Inner Mongolia, China

Ulanqab Jining Airport 乌兰察布集宁机场 ᠤᠯᠠᠭᠠᠨᠴᠠᠪ ᠵᠢᠩᠨᠢ ᠨᠢᠰᠬᠦ ᠪᠠᠭᠤᠳᠠᠯ
- IATA: UCB; ICAO: ZBUC

Summary
- Airport type: Public
- Serves: Ulanqab, Inner Mongolia
- Opened: 25 April 2016; 10 years ago
- Coordinates: 41°07′47″N 113°06′29″E

Map
- Location of airport in Inner Mongolia

Runways
Direction	Length		Surface
Direction	m	ft	Surface
09/27	3,200	10,499	Concrete

Statistics (2021)
- Passengers: 44,571
- Aircraft movements: 2,299
- Cargo (metric tons): 21.9

Ulanqab Jining Airport

Chinese name
- Simplified Chinese: 乌兰察布集宁机场
- Traditional Chinese: 烏蘭察布集寧機場
Transcriptions
Standard Mandarin
- Hanyu Pinyin: Wūlánchábù Jíníng Jīchǎng

Mongolian name
- Mongolian Cyrillic: Улаанцав Жининь нисэх буудал
- Mongolian script: ᠤᠯᠠᠭᠠᠨᠴᠠᠪ ᠵᠢᠩᠨᠢ ᠨᠢᠰᠬᠦ ᠪᠠᠭᠤᠳᠠᠯ

Ulanqab (Wulanchabu) Jining Airport (IATA: UCB, ICAO: ZBUC) is an airport located 10 kilometres (6.2 mi) in the north of the city of Ulanqab in Inner Mongolia, China. The airport received approval from the State Council of China and the Central Military Commission on 31 July 2013. The airport was opened on 25 April 2016.

== Facilities ==
The airport has a runway that is 3,200 meters long and 45 meters wide, and a 35,700-square-meter terminal building with 7 aerobridges. It is projected to handle 1 million passengers and 9000 tons of cargo annually in the next few years.

== Airlines and destinations ==
Airlines	Destinations
China Express Airlines	Chifeng, Chongqing, Xi'an, Xilinhot
China Southern Airlines	Guangzhou, Zhengzhou
Hebei Airlines	Hangzhou, Shijiazhuang
Tian Jiao Airlines	Ulanhot, Xilinhot
Tianjin Airlines	Hulunbuir, Tongliao, Wuhan, Xi'an

== See also ==
- List of airports in China
- List of the busiest airports in China
