= Xining Caojiapu International Airport =

Airport serving Xining, Qinghai, China

Xining Caojiapu International Airport 西宁曹家堡国际机场
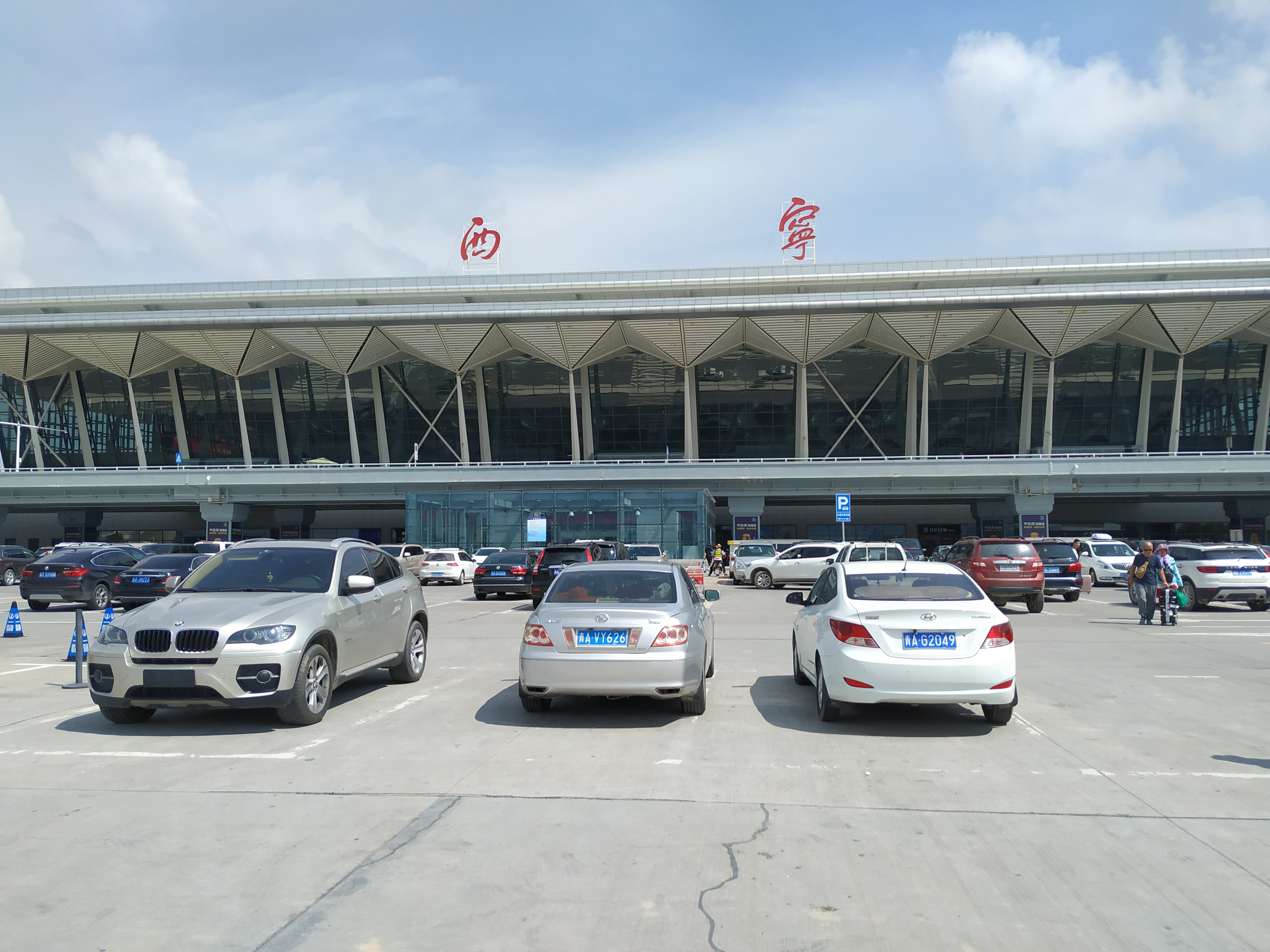
- The airport terminal
- IATA: XNN; ICAO: ZLXN

Summary
- Operator: China West Airport Group
- Serves: Xining and Haidong; Qinghai
- Location: Huzhu County, Qinghai
- Opened: 27 December 1991; 34 years ago
- Elevation AMSL: 2,170 m (7,120 ft)
- Coordinates: 36°31′39″N 102°02′34″E
- Website: qhaport.cwag.com

Map
- Location in Qinghai Location in China

Runways
Direction	Length		Surface
Direction	m	ft	Surface
11/29	3,800	12,467	Asphalt

Statistics (2025)
- Passengers: 7,877,903
- Aircraft movements: 63,344
- Cargo (metric tonnes): 40,127.8
- Source: List of the busiest airports in China, GCM, STV

Xining Caojiapu International Airport
- Simplified Chinese: 西宁曹家堡国际机场
- Traditional Chinese: 西寧曹家堡國際機場
Transcriptions
Standard Mandarin
- Hanyu Pinyin: Xīníng Cáojiāpǔ Guójì Jīchǎng

Xining Caojiapu International Airport (IATA: XNN, ICAO: ZLXN) is an airport serving Xining, the capital of Qinghai Province, China. It is located in Huzhu County, Haidong, on the Tibetan Plateau about 30 kilometres (19 mi) east of downtown Xining. The airport began operation in 1991. In October 2011, a new 3,800-meter runway entered service. The older runway now serves as a taxiway.

According to the Civil Aviation Administration of China, in 2025, Xining Caojiapu International Airport recorded 63,344 flight takeoffs and landings, and 7.88 million passenger movements, representing a year-on-year increases of 12.1% and 11.9% respectively.

== History ==
The first airport in the area was located near the town of Lejiawan, 17 km (11 mi) west of the current airport. Built on the orders of military governor Ma Bufang in 1931, it saw limited use by commercial airlines in 1933. In 1957, the runway was expanded to 2,600 metres (8,500 ft) and more facilities were added. A commercial route flew between Xining, Lanzhou, Baotou, and Beijing with fewer than 1,000 passengers per year. The airport was shared with the military.

In 1975, plans were made to relocate the airport, as the Lejiawan Airport was limited by a one-way gravel runway. Construction of Caojiapu airport was approved by the State Council on 17 May 1985 and started in 1989. The airport opened in December 1991. The site of the former airport is now a military base.

== Airlines and destinations ==
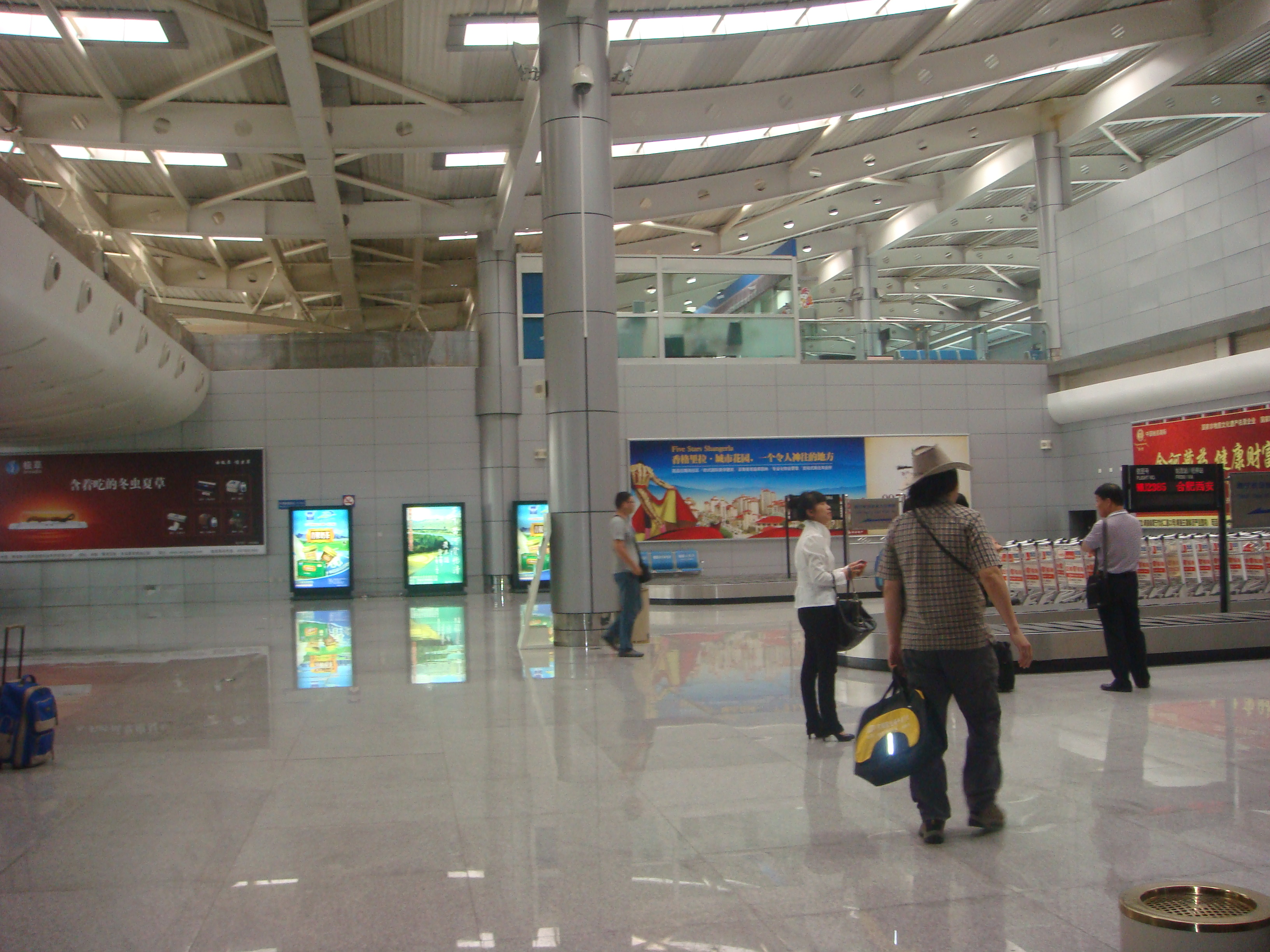
Arrivals Area

Airlines	Destinations
Air China	Beijing–Capital, Chengdu–Shuangliu, Chengdu–Tianfu, Hangzhou, Shanghai–Pudong, Taiyuan, Tianjin, Urumqi
Air Travel	Changsha, Nanjing, Yan'an
Beijing Capital Airlines	Beijing–Daxing, Golmud, Haikou, Hangzhou, Nanchang, Xi'an, Yushu, Zhongwei
China Eastern Airlines	Beijing–Daxing, Chengdu–Tianfu, Delingha, Dunhuang, Golmud, Golog, Hefei, Huatugou, Jinan, Kunming, Nanchang, Nanjing, Ningbo, Ordos, Qilian, Qingdao, Shanghai–Hongqiao, Shanghai–Pudong, Shenyang, Wuhan, Xi'an, Yinchuan, Yushu
China Southern Airlines	Beijing–Daxing, Changsha, Guangzhou, Guiyang, Wuhan, Zhengzhou
China United Airlines	Beijing–Daxing
GX Airlines	Nanning
Fuzhou Airlines	Longnan, Xiamen
Hainan Airlines	Haikou, Xi'an
Hong Kong Airlines	Hong Kong
LJ Air	Taiyuan
Loong Air	Changsha, Chengdu–Tianfu, Enshi, Handan, Hangzhou, Linyi, Shenzhen, Xuzhou, Zhengzhou
Lucky Air	Kunming, Lhasa, Zhengzhou
Ruili Airlines	Kunming, Taiyuan, Wuhan, Yinchuan
Shandong Airlines	Jinan, Yinchuan
Shanghai Airlines	Shanghai–Pudong
Shenzhen Airlines	Shenyang, Shenzhen, Xi'an
Sichuan Airlines	Chengdu–Tianfu, Chongqing, Dunhuang, Kunming, Lhasa, Luzhou, Sanya, Urumqi
Spring Airlines	Shanghai–Hongqiao, Shijiazhuang
West Air	Kashgar, Zhengzhou
XiamenAir	Changsha, Chongqing, Fuzhou, Hangzhou, Quanzhou, Wuhan, Zhengzhou
Xizang Airlines	Chengdu–Shuangliu, Chongqing, Golmud, Golog, Jieyang, Kashgar, Lhasa, Nanchong, Ngari–Gunsa, Shache, Shigatse–Peace, Shijiazhuang, Tianjin, Xi'an, Yuncheng, Yushu, Zhengzhou

== See also ==
- List of airports in China
