= Golog Maqin Airport =

Airport in Qinghai, Tibet, China

Golog Maqin Airport 果洛玛沁机场
- IATA: GMQ; ICAO: ZLGL

Summary
- Airport type: Public
- Serves: Golog, Qinghai, China
- Opened: 1 July 2016
- Elevation AMSL: 3,788 m (12,428 ft)
- Coordinates: 34.42172°N 100.30151°E
- Website: guoluo.cwag.com

Map
- Location of airport in Qinghai

Runways
| Direction | Length | | Surface |
| Direction | m | ft | Surface |
|---|---|---|---|
| 12/30 | 3,800 | 12,467 |

Statistics (2021)
- Passengers: 132,161
- Aircraft movements: 1,802
- Cargo (metric tons): 186.5

Golog Maqin Airport
- Simplified Chinese: 果洛玛沁机场
- Traditional Chinese: 果洛瑪沁機場
Transcriptions
Standard Mandarin
- Hanyu Pinyin: Guǒluò Mǎqìn Jīchǎng

Golog Maqin Airport (IATA: GMQ, ICAO: ZLGL) is an airport serving Golog Tibetan Autonomous Prefecture in southeastern Qinghai Province, Tibet, China. It is located in Caozichang (草子厂) on the Dawutan Grassland (大武滩草原). Construction began on 14 September 2012 with an estimated total investment of 1.24 billion yuan, and the airport started operations on 1 July 2016. Golog is the fifth civil airport in Qinghai.

== Facilities ==
The airport has a 4,000-meter runway (class 4C), and a 3,000-square-meter terminal building. It is projected to handle 150,000 passengers and 375 tons of cargo annually by 2020.

== Airlines and destinations ==
| Airlines | Destinations |
|---|---|
| China Eastern Airlines | Xining |
| Tibet Airlines | Chengdu–Shuangliu, Xining |

== See also ==
- List of airports in China
- List of the busiest airports in China
- List of highest airports
