= Geosky =

Georgian cargo airline

Aircompany Geo-Sky
IATA	ICAO	Call sign
D4	GEL	SKY GEORGIA
- Founded: 2017
- Commenced operations: 2017
- Hubs: Tbilisi International Airport
- Fleet size: 5
- Headquarters: Tbilisi, Georgia
- Website: airgeosky.ge

Geosky is a Georgian cargo airline founded in 2017. According to the Civil Aviation Agency of the Ministry of Economy and Sustainable Development of Georgia, Geosky is the busiest airline in the country in terms of number of flights flown. It also operated passenger flights in the past under the brand name Georgian Wings. Formerly called Geo-Sky, the airline changed its name to Geosky in 2022, along with the unveiling of the airline's new livery.

== Destinations ==
The airline primarily operates cargo services between Europe and Southeast Asia, with a primary market of cargo transfer between Germany, Georgia and China. Geo-Sky started additional scheduled passenger operations after gaining a contract for services in Sudan in 2023.

=== Interline agreements ===
- Hahn Air

== Fleet ==
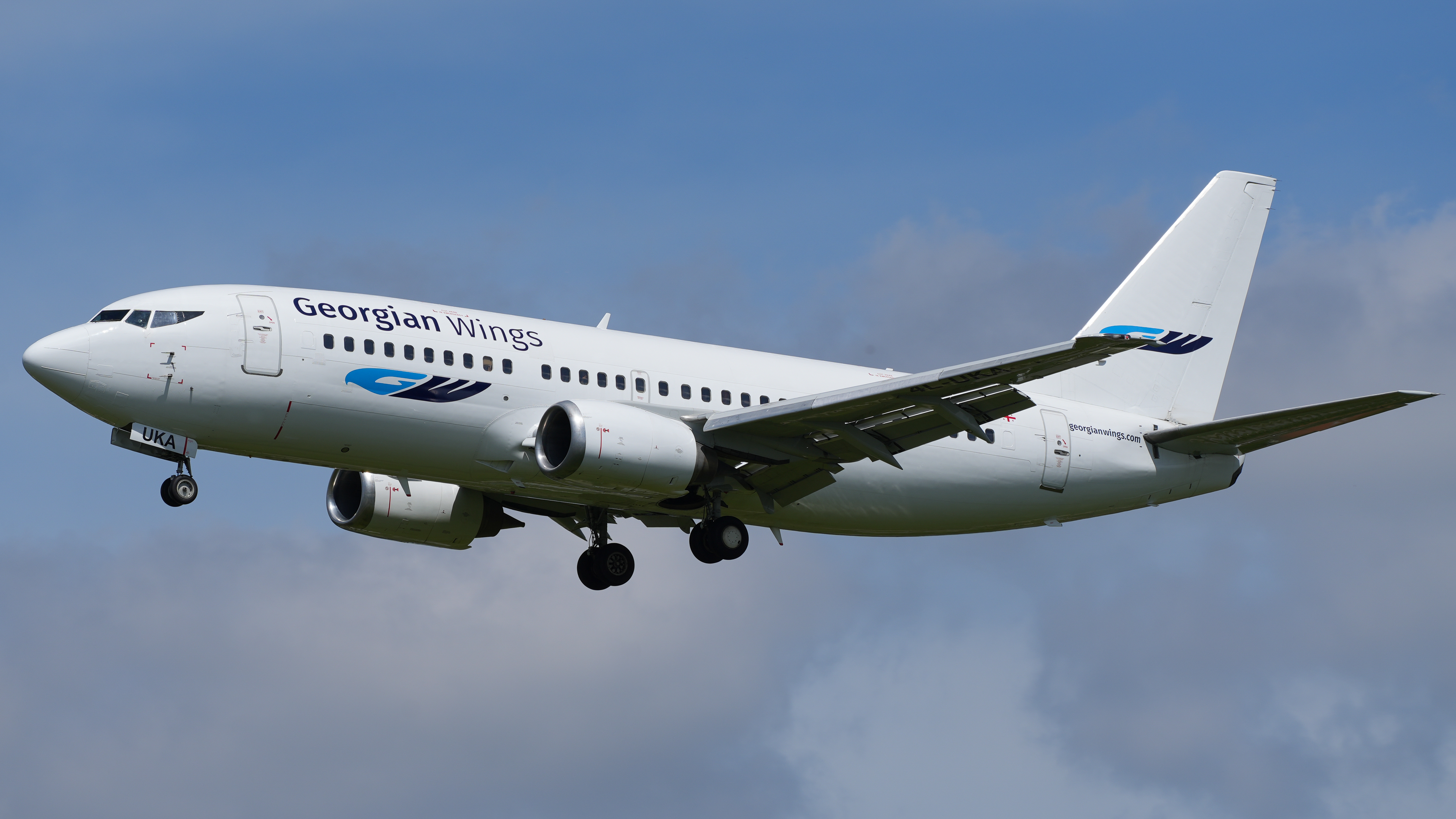
Geo-Sky Boeing 737-800 wearing the Georgian Wings branding

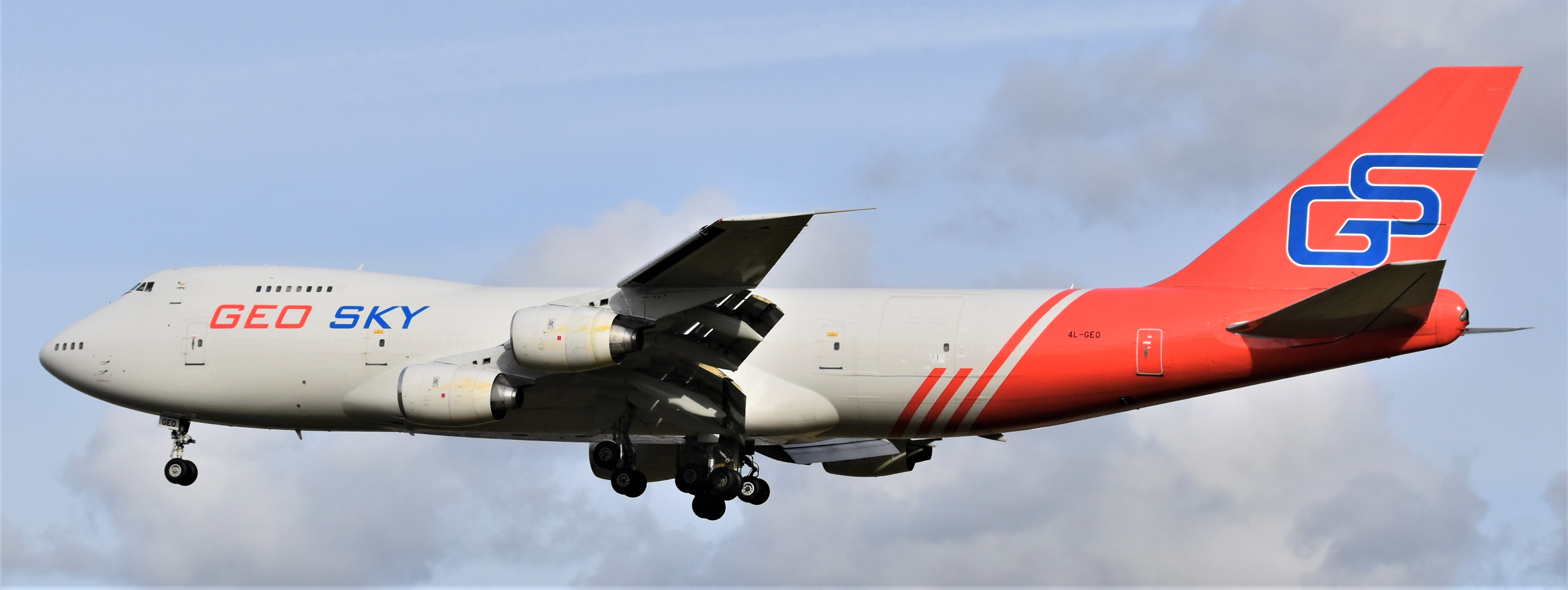
Geo-Sky Boeing 747-200SF

As of July 2026, Geo-Sky operates the following aircraft:

Aircraft	In service	Orders	Passengers			References	
Aircraft	In service	Orders	C	Y	Total	References	Notes
Boeing 767-300ER(BCF)	4	—	—	—	—		
Total	4						

=== Historical fleet ===
Former fleet
Aircraft	Total	Introduced	Retired	Notes
ATR 72-500	2	2023	2023	Operated only under Georgian Wings brand
Boeing 737-300	2	2023	2025	
Boeing 737-800	1	2022	2023	
Boeing 747-200SF	4	2017	2024	
Boeing 757-200PCF	1	2022	2026	
