= List of airports in China =

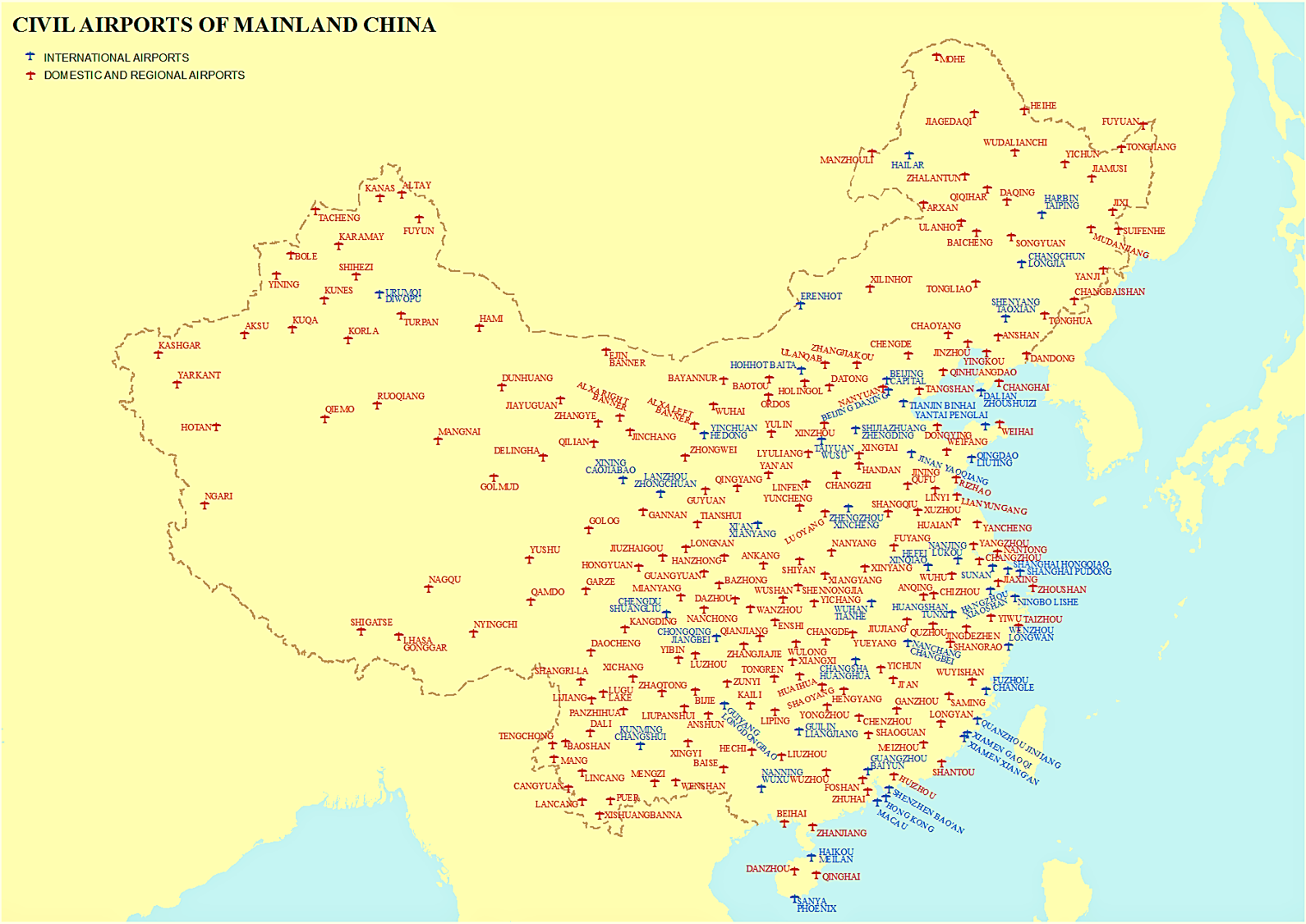
Civil airports of Mainland China, Hong Kong, and Macau

This is a list of public airports in the People's Republic of China grouped by provincial-level division and sorted by main city or county served. It includes civil airports and certified general airports, (Note: The general airports are divided into two principles, A and B. The principle A means that airports are open to the public, things are the opposite for the principle B. The airports of principle A (excluding heliports) need to get the licence to operate, the airports of principle B and heliports just need to be filed.) but excludes general airports filed under principle B, defunct airports and military air bases.

The names mentioned in the table are officially named by the Civil Aviation Administration of China (CAAC). The Aerodrome Reference Code (ARC) was officially stated by "License for Civil/General Airport". The characters between international airport and national airport were published by General Administration of Customs of the People's Republic of China (GACC).

As of 10 January 2024, there were 259 certified civil airports and 106 certified general airports. As of 30 May 2023, the State Council of the People's Republic of China established 83 aviation ports (involving 86 airports), and the CAAC approved 63 airports to rename "International Airport" among them. This figure includes airports governed by the CAAC and it does not include the special administrative regions of Hong Kong and Macau (or the area administered by Taiwan). Both Hong Kong and Macau have their own civil aviation regulators (the Civil Aviation Department and the Civil Aviation Authority respectively).

== Civil airports ==
Main city served	ICAO	IATA	ARC	INTL - NTL	Civil - joint civil/military	Airport name
ANHUI
Anqing	ZSAQ	AQG	4C	NTL	Joint civil/military	Anqing Tianzhushan Airport
Chizhou	ZSJH	JUH	4C	NTL	Civil	Chizhou Jiuhuashan Airport
Fuyang	ZSFY	FUG	4C	NTL	Civil	Fuyang Airport
Hefei	ZSOF	HFE	4E	INTL	Civil	Hefei Xinqiao International Airport
Huangshan	ZSTX	TXN	4D	INTL	Civil	Huangshan Tunxi International Airport
Wuhu & Xuancheng	ZSWA	WHA	4C	NTL	Civil	Wuhu Xuanzhou Airport
Bengbu	ZSBA	BFY	4C	NTL	Civil	Bengbu Tenghu Airport
Bozhou	ZSBO	BZJ	4C	NTL	Civil	Bozhou Airport
BEIJING
Beijing	ZBAA	PEK	4F	INTL	Civil	Beijing Capital International Airport
Beijing	ZBAD	PKX	4F	INTL	Civil	Beijing Daxing International Airport
CHONGQING
Chongqing	ZUCK	CKG	4F	INTL	Civil	Chongqing Jiangbei International Airport
Qianjiang (Chongqing)	ZUQJ	JIQ	4C	NTL	Civil	Qianjiang Wulingshan Airport
Wanzhou (Chongqing)	ZUWX	WXN	4C	INTL	Civil	Wanzhou Wuqiao Airport
Wulong (Chongqing)	ZUWL	CQW	4C	NTL	Civil	Chongqing Xiannvshan Airport
Wushan (Chongqing)	ZUWS	WSK	4C	NTL	Civil	Chongqing Wushan Airport
FUJIAN
Fuzhou	ZSFZ	FOC	4F	INTL	Civil	Fuzhou Changle International Airport
Longyan	ZSLD	LCX	4C	NTL	Joint civil/military	Liancheng Guanzhishan Airport
Quanzhou	ZSQZ	JJN	4D	INTL	Joint civil/military	Quanzhou Jinjiang International Airport
Sanming	ZSSM	SQJ	4C	NTL	Civil	Sanming Shaxian Airport
Wuyishan (Nanping)	ZSWY	WUS	4C	INTL	Joint civil/military	Wuyishan Airport
Xiamen	ZSAM	XMN	4E	INTL	Civil	Xiamen Gaoqi International Airport
Xiamen	ZSAM	XMN	4F	INTL	Under construction	Xiamen Xiang'an International Airport
GANSU
Dunhuang (Jiuquan)	ZLDH	DNH	4D	INTL	Civil	Dunhuang Mogao International Airport
Hezuo (Gannan)	ZLXH	GXH	4C	NTL	Civil	Gannan Xiahe Airport
Jiayuguan & Jiuquan	ZLJQ	JGN	4D	NTL	Civil	Jiayuguan Jiuquan Airport
Jinchang	ZLJC	JIC	4C	NTL	Civil	Jinchang Jinchuan Airport
Lanzhou	ZLLL	LHW	4E	INTL	Civil	Lanzhou Zhongchuan International Airport
Longnan	ZLLN	LNL	4C	NTL	Civil	Longnan Chengxian Airport
Qingyang	ZLQY	IQN	4C	NTL	Civil	Qingyang Airport
Tianshui	ZLTS	THQ	3C	NTL	Joint civil/military	Tianshui Maijishan Airport
Zhangye	ZLZY	YZY	4C	NTL	Joint civil/military	Zhangye Ganzhou Airport
GUANGDONG
Foshan	ZGFS	FUO	4C	NTL	Joint civil/military	Foshan Shadi Airport
Guangzhou	ZGGG	CAN	4F	INTL	Civil	Guangzhou Baiyun International Airport
Huizhou	ZGHZ	HUZ	4C	NTL	Joint civil/military	Huizhou Pingtan Airport
Jieyang & Chaozhou & Shantou	ZGOW	SWA	4E	INTL	Civil	Jieyang Chaoshan International Airport
Meizhou	ZGMX	MXZ	4C	NTL	Civil	Meizhou Meixian Airport
Shaoguan	ZGSG	HSC	4C	NTL	Joint civil/military	Shaoguan Danxia Airport
Shenzhen	ZGSZ	SZX	4F	INTL	Civil	Shenzhen Baoan International Airport
Zhanjiang	ZGZJ	ZHA	4E	INTL	Civil	Zhanjiang Wuchuan International Airport
Zhuhai	ZGSD	ZUH	4E	NTL	Civil	Zhuhai Jinwan Airport
Pearl River Delta (specifically Foshan)	-	-	4E	INTL	Under construction	Foshan Gaoming International Airport
GUANGXI
Baise & Bama (Hechi)	ZGBS	AEB	4C	NTL	Joint civil/military	Baise Bama Airport
Beihai	ZGBH	BHY	4C	INTL	Civil	Beihai Fucheng Airport
Guilin	ZGKL	KWL	4E	INTL	Civil	Guilin Liangjiang International Airport
Hechi	ZGHC	HCJ	4C	NTL	Civil	Hechi Jinchengjiang Airport
Liuzhou	ZGZH	LZH	4C	NTL	Joint civil/military	Liuzhou Bailian Airport
Nanning	ZGNN	NNG	4E	INTL	Joint civil/military	Nanning Wuxu International Airport
Wuzhou	ZGWZ	WUZ	4C	NTL	Civil	Wuzhou Xijiang Airport
Yulin	ZGYL	YLX	4C	NTL	Civil	Yulin Fumian Airport
GUIZHOU
Anshun	ZUAS	AVA	4C	NTL	Joint civil/military	Anshun Huangguoshu Airport
Bijie	ZUBJ	BFJ	4C	NTL	Civil	Bijie Feixiong Airport
Guiyang	ZUGY	KWE	4E	INTL	Civil	Guiyang Longdongbao International Airport
Kaili (Qiandongnan)	ZUKJ	KJH	4C	NTL	Civil	Kaili Huangping Airport
Libo (Qiannan)	ZULB	LLB	4C	NTL	Civil	Qiannan Libo Airport
Liping (Qiandongnan)	ZUNP	HZH	4C	NTL	Civil	Qiandongnan Liping Airport
Liupanshui	ZUPS	LPF	4C	NTL	Civil	Liupanshui Yuezhao Airport
Renhuai (Zunyi)	ZUMT	WMT	4C	NTL	Civil	Zunyi Maotai Airport
Tongren & Fenghuang (Xiangxi)	ZUTR	TEN	4C	NTL	Civil	Tongren Fenghuang Airport
Xingyi (Qianxinan)	ZUYI	ACX	4C	NTL	Civil	Xingyi Wanfenglin Airport
Zunyi	ZUZY	ZYI	4C	INTL	Joint civil/military	Zunyi Xinzhou Airport
Dejiang (Tongren)	ZUDJ	DEJ	4C	NTL	Civil	Tongren Dejiang Airport
Panzhou (Liupanshui)	-	-	4C	NTL	Under construction	Panzhou Guanshan Airport
Weining (Bijie)	ZUWN	WNJ	4C	NTL	Under construction	Weining Caohai Airport
HAINAN
Haikou	ZJHK	HAK	4E	INTL	Civil	Haikou Meilan International Airport
Qionghai	ZJQH	BAR	4C	INTL	Civil	Qionghai Boao International Airport
Sansha (Note: Located in a disputed area)	ZJYX	XYI	4C	NTL	Joint civil/military	Sansha Yongxing Airport
Sanya	ZJSY	SYX	4E	INTL	Civil	Sanya Phoenix International Airport
HEBEI
Chengde	ZBCD	CDE	4C	NTL	Civil	Chengde Puning Airport
Handan	ZBHD	HDG	4C	NTL	Civil	Handan Airport
Qinhuangdao	ZBDH	BPE	4C	NTL	Civil	Qinhuangdao Beidaihe Airport
Shijiazhuang	ZBSJ	SJW	4E	INTL	Civil	Shijiazhuang Zhengding International Airport
Tangshan	ZBSN	TVS	4C	NTL	Joint civil/military	Tangshan Sannvhe Airport
Xingtai	ZBXT	XNT	4C	NTL	Joint civil/military	Xingtai Dalian Airport
Zhangjiakou	ZBZJ	ZQZ	4C	NTL	Joint civil/military	Zhangjiakou Ningyuan Airport
HEILONGJIANG
Daqing	ZYDQ	DQA	4C	NTL	Civil	Daqing Saertu Airport
Fuyuan (Jiamusi)	ZYFY	FYJ	4C	NTL	Civil	Fuyuan Dongji Airport
Harbin	ZYHB	HRB	4E	INTL	Civil	Harbin Taiping International Airport
Heihe	ZYHE	HEK	4C	NTL	Civil	Heihe Aihui Airport
Jiagedaqi (Daxing'anling) & Elunchun (Hulunbuir)	ZYJD	JGD	4C	NTL	Civil	Daxing'anling Elunchun Airport
Jiamusi	ZYJM	JMU	4C	INTL	Joint civil/military	Jiamusi Songjiang International Airport
Jiansanjiang (Jiamusi)	ZYJS	JSJ	4C	NTL	Civil	Jiansanjiang Shidi Airport
Jixi	ZYJX	JXA	4C	NTL	Civil	Jixi Xingkaihu Airport
Mohe (Daxing'anling)	ZYMH	OHE	4C	NTL	Civil	Mohe Gulian Airport
Mudanjiang	ZYMD	MDG	4C	INTL	Joint civil/military	Mudanjiang Hailang International Airport
Qiqihar	ZYQQ	NDG	4C	INTL	Joint civil/military	Qiqihar Sanjiazi Airport
Suifenhe (Mudanjiang) & Dongning (Mudanjiang)	ZYSD	HSF	4C	NTL	Civil	Suifenhe Dongning Airport
Wudalianchi (Heihe)	ZYDU	DTU	4C	NTL	Civil	Wudalianchi Dedu Airport
Yichun	ZYLD	LDS	4C	NTL	Civil	Yichun Lindu Airport
HENAN
Anyang	ZHQQ	HQQ	4C	NTL	Civil	Anyang Hongqiqu Airport
Luoyang	ZHLY	LYA	4D	INTL	Civil	Luoyang Beijiao Airport
Nanyang	ZHNY	NNY	4D	NTL	Civil	Nanyang Jiangying Airport
Xinyang & Zhumadian	ZHXY	XAI	4C	NTL	Joint civil/military	Xinyang Minggang Airport
Zhengzhou	ZHCC	CGO	4F	INTL	Civil	Zhengzhou Xinzheng International Airport
HONG KONG SAR (Note: Hong Kong is regulated by the Civil Aviation Department Hong Kong and not by the CAAC.)
Hong Kong	VHHH	HKG	4F	INTL	Civil	Hong Kong International Airport
HUBEI
Enshi (Enshi)	ZHES	ENH	4C	INTL	Civil	Enshi Xujiaping International Airport
Ezhou	ZHEC	EHU	4E	INTL	Civil	Ezhou Huahu International Airport
Jingzhou	ZHJZ	SHS	4C	NTL	Civil	Jingzhou Shashi Airport
Shennongjia	ZHSN	HPG	4C	NTL	Civil	Shennongjia Hongping Airport
Shiyan	ZHSY	WDS	4C	NTL	Civil	Shiyan Wudangshan Airport
Wuhan	ZHHH	WUH	4F	INTL	Civil	Wuhan Tianhe International Airport
Xiangyang	ZHXF	XFN	4D	NTL	Civil	Xiangyang Liuji Airport
Yichang	ZHYC	YIH	4D	INTL	Civil	Yichang Sanxia International Airport
HUNAN
Changde	ZGCD	CGD	4D	NTL	Civil	Changde Taohuayuan Airport
Changsha	ZGHA	CSX	4E	INTL	Civil	Changsha Huanghua International Airport
Chenzhou	ZGCZ	HCZ	4C	NTL	Civil	Chenzhou Beihu Airport
Hengyang	ZGHY	HNY	4C	NTL	Civil	Hengyang Nanyue Airport
Huaihua	ZGCJ	HJJ	4C	NTL	Joint civil/military	Huaihua Zhijiang Airport
Jishou (Xiangxi)	ZGXX	DXJ	4C	NTL	Civil	Xiangxi Biancheng Airport
Wugang (Shaoyang)	ZGSY	WGN	4C	NTL	Civil	Shaoyang Wugang Airport
Yongzhou	ZGLG	LLF	4C	NTL	Joint civil/military	Yongzhou Lingling Airport
Yueyang	ZGYY	YYA	4C	NTL	Civil	Yueyang Sanhe Airport
Zhangjiajie	ZGDY	DYG	4D	INTL	Civil	Zhangjiajie Hehua International Airport
INNER MONGOLIA
Aershan (Hinggan)	ZBES	YIE	4C	NTL	Civil	Aershan Yiershi Airport
Alxa Left Banner (Alxa)	ZBAL	AXF	3C	NTL	Civil	Alxa Left Banner Bayanhot Airport
Alxa Right Banner (Alxa)	ZBAR	RHT	3C	NTL	Civil	Alxa Right Banner Badanjilin Airport
Baotou	ZBOW	BAV	4C	INTL	Civil	Baotou Donghe International Airport
Bayannaoer	ZBYZ	RLK	4C	NTL	Civil	Bayannaoer Tianjitai Airport
Chifeng	ZBCF	CIF	4C	NTL	Joint civil/military	Chifeng Yulong Airport
Ejina Banner (Alxa)	ZBEN	EJN	3C	NTL	Civil	Ejina Banner Taolai Airport
Erenhot (Xilingol)	ZBER	ERL	4C	INTL	Civil	Erenhot Saiwusu International Airport
Hailar (Hulunbuir)	ZBLA	HLD	4D	INTL	Civil	Hulunbeier Hailar Airport
Hohhot	ZBHH	HET	4E	INTL	Civil	Hohhot Baita International Airport
Huolinguole (Tongliao)	ZBHZ	HUO	4C	NTL	Civil	Huolinguole Huolinhe Airport
Manzhouli (Hulunbuir)	ZBMZ	NZH	4D	INTL	Civil	Manzhouli Xijiao International Airport
Ordos	ZBDS	DSN	4E	INTL	Civil	Ordos Ejin Horo International Airport
Tongliao	ZBTL	TGO	4C	NTL	Civil	Tongliao Airport
Ulanhot (Hinggan)	ZBUL	HLH	4C	NTL	Civil	Ulanhot Yilelite Airport
Ulanqab	ZBUC	UCB	4C	NTL	Civil	Ulanqab Jining Airport
Wuhai	ZBUH	WUA	4C	NTL	Civil	Wuhai Airport
Xilinhot (Xilingol)	ZBXH	XIL	4C	NTL	Civil	Xilinhot Airport
Zhalantun (Hulunbuir)	ZBZL	NZL	4C	NTL	Civil	Zhalantun Chengjisihan Airport
Hohhot	ZBHH	HET	4F	INTL	Under construction	Hohhot Chilechuan International Airport
JIANGSU
Changzhou	ZSCG	CZX	4E	INTL	Joint civil/military	Changzhou Benniu International Airport
Huaian	ZSSH	HIA	4D	INTL	Civil	Huaian Lianshui International Airport
Lianyungang	ZSLG	LYG	4D	INTL	Civil	Lianyungang Huaguoshan International Airport
Nanjing	ZSNJ	NKG	4F	INTL	Civil	Nanjing Lukou International Airport
Nantong	ZSNT	NTG	4E	INTL	Civil	Nantong Xingdong International Airport
Wuxi & Suzhou	ZSWX	WUX	4E	INTL	Joint civil/military	Wuxi Shuofang Airport
Xuzhou	ZSXZ	XUZ	4D	INTL	Civil	Xuzhou Guanyin International Airport
Yancheng	ZSYN	YNZ	4C	INTL	Joint civil/military	Yancheng Nanyang International Airport
Yangzhou & Taizhou	ZSYA	YTY	4E	INTL	Civil	Yangzhou Taizhou International Airport
JIANGXI
Ganzhou	ZSGZ	KOW	4C	NTL	Civil	Ganzhou Huangjin Airport
Ji'an	ZSGS	JGS	4C	NTL	Joint civil/military	Ji'an Jinggangshan Airport
Jingdezhen	ZSJD	JDZ	4C	NTL	Civil	Jingdezhen Luojia Airport
Jiujiang	ZSJJ	JIU	4C	NTL	Joint civil/military	Jiujiang Lushan Airport
Nanchang	ZSCN	KHN	4E	INTL	Civil	Nanchang Changbei International Airport
Ruijin (Ganzhou)	ZSRJ	JRJ	4C	NTL	Civil	Ganzhou Ruijin Airport
Shangrao	ZSSR	SQD	4C	NTL	Civil	Shangrao Sanqingshan Airport
Yichun	ZSYC	YIC	4C	NTL	Civil	Yichun Mingyueshan Airport
JILIN
Baicheng	ZYBA	DBC	4C	NTL	Civil	Baicheng Chang'an Airport
Changchun	ZYCC	CGQ	4E	INTL	Civil	Changchun Longjia International Airport
Fusong (Baishan)	ZYBS	NBS	4D	NTL	Civil	Baishan Changbaishan Airport
Songyuan	ZYSQ	YSQ	4C	NTL	Civil	Songyuan Chaganhu Airport
Tonghua	ZYTN	TNH	4C	NTL	Joint civil/military	Tonghua Sanyuanpu Airport
Yanji (Yanbian)	ZYYJ	YNJ	4C	INTL	Joint civil/military	Yanji Chaoyangchuan International Airport
Jilin	ZYJL	JIL	4C	NTL	Resuming civil operation	Jilin Ertaizi Airport
LIAONING
Anshan	ZYAS	AOG	4C	NTL	Joint civil/military	Anshan Teng'ao Airport
Changhai (Dalian)	ZYCH	CNI	1B	NTL	Civil	Changhai Dachangshandao Airport
Chaoyang	ZYCY	CHG	4C	NTL	Civil	Chaoyang Airport
Dalian	ZYTL	DLC	4E	INTL	Joint civil/military	Dalian Zhoushuizi International Airport
Dalian	ZYTL	DLC	4E	INTL	Under construction	Dalian Jinzhouwan International Airport
Dandong	ZYDD	DDG	4C	NTL	Joint civil/military	Dandong Langtou Airport
Jinzhou	ZYJZ	JNZ	4C	NTL	Civil	Jinzhou Jinzhouwan Airport
Shenyang	ZYTX	SHE	4E	INTL	Civil	Shenyang Taoxian International Airport
Yingkou	ZYYK	YKH	4C	NTL	Civil	Yingkou Lanqi Airport
MACAU SAR (Note: Macau is regulated by the Autoridade de Aviação Civil de Macau and not by the CAAC.)
Macau	VMMC	MFM	4E	INTL	Civil	Macau International Airport
NINGXIA
Guyuan	ZLGY	GYU	4C	NTL	Civil	Guyuan Liupanshan Airport
Yinchuan	ZLIC	INC	4E	INTL	Civil	Yinchuan Hedong International Airport
Zhongwei	ZLZW	ZHY	4C	NTL	Civil	Zhongwei Shapotou Airport
QINGHAI
Delingha (Haixi)	ZLDL	HXD	4C	NTL	Civil	Haixi Delingha Airport
Golmud (Haixi)	ZLGM	GOQ	4D	NTL	Joint civil/military	Golmud Airport
Mangnai (Haixi)	ZLHX	HTT	4C	NTL	Civil	Haixi Mangnai Airport
Maqin (Golog)	ZLGL	GMQ	4C	NTL	Civil	Golog Maqin Airport
Qilian (Haibei)	ZLHB	HBQ	4C	NTL	Civil	Haibei Qilian Airport
Xining	ZLXN	XNN	4E	INTL	Civil	Xining Caojiapu International Airport
Yushu (Yushu)	ZLYS	YUS	4C	NTL	Civil	Yushu Batang Airport
Gonghe (Hainan)	-	-	4C	NTL	Under construction	Gonghe Qinghaihu Airport
SHAANXI
Ankang	ZLAK	AKA	4C	NTL	Joint civil/military	Ankang Fuqiang Airport
Hanzhong	ZLHZ	HZG	4C	NTL	Joint civil/military	Hanzhong Chenggu Airport
Xi'an & Xianyang	ZLXY	XIY	4F	INTL	Civil	Xi'an Xianyang International Airport
Yan'an	ZLYA	ENY	4C	NTL	Joint civil/military	Yan'an Nanniwan Airport
Yulin	ZLYL	UYN	4D	NTL	Civil	Yulin Yuyang Airport
Dingbian (Yulin)	-	-	4C	NTL	Under construction	Dingbian Shilisha Airport
Fugu (Yulin)	-	-	4C	NTL	Under construction	Fugu Fuzhou Airport
SHANDONG
Dongying	ZSDY	DOY	4D	NTL	Civil	Dongying Shengli Airport
Heze	ZSHZ	HZA	4C	NTL	Civil	Heze Mudan Airport
Jinan	ZSJN	TNA	4E	INTL	Civil	Jinan Yaoqiang International Airport
Jining	ZSJG	JNG	4C	NTL	Civil	Jining Daan Airport
Linyi	ZSLY	LYI	4D	INTL	Civil	Linyi Qiyang International Airport
Qingdao	ZSQD	TAO	4F	INTL	Civil	Qingdao Jiaodong International Airport
Rizhao	ZSRZ	RIZ	4C	NTL	Civil	Rizhao Shanzihe Airport
Weifang	ZSWF	WEF	4D	NTL	Joint civil/military	Weifang Airport
Weihai	ZSWH	WEH	4D	INTL	Joint civil/military	Weihai Dashuipo International Airport
Yantai	ZSYT	YNT	4E	INTL	Civil	Yantai Penglai International Airport
Zaozhuang	ZSZF	ZZH	4C	NTL	Civil	Zaozhuang Yiyun Airport
SHANGHAI
Shanghai	ZSSS	SHA	4E	INTL	Civil	Shanghai Hongqiao International Airport
Shanghai	ZSPD	PVG	4F	INTL	Civil	Shanghai Pudong International Airport
SHANXI
Changzhi	ZBCZ	CIH	4C	NTL	Joint civil/military	Changzhi Wangcun Airport
Datong	ZBDT	DAT	4C	INTL	Civil	Datong Yungang International Airport
Linfen	ZBLF	LFQ	4C	NTL	Civil	Linfen Yaodu Airport
Lvliang	ZBLL	LLV	4C	NTL	Civil	Lvliang Dawu Airport
Shuozhou	ZBSG	SZH	4C	NTL	Civil	Shuozhou Zirun Airport
Taiyuan	ZBYN	TYN	4E	INTL	Civil	Taiyuan Wusu International Airport
Xinzhou	ZBXZ	WUT	4C	NTL	Joint civil/military	Xinzhou Wutaishan Airport
Yuncheng	ZBYC	YCU	4E	INTL	Civil	Yuncheng Yanhu International Airport
SICHUAN
Barkam (Aba)	ZUHY	AHJ	4C	NTL	Civil	Aba Hongyuan Airport
Bazhong	ZUBZ	BZX	4C	NTL	Civil	Bazhong Enyang Airport
Chengdu	ZUUU	CTU	4F	INTL	Civil	Chengdu Shuangliu International Airport
Chengdu	ZUTF	TFU	4F	INTL	Civil	Chengdu Tianfu International Airport
Daocheng (Ganzi)	ZUDC	DCY	4C	NTL	Civil	Daocheng Yading Airport
Dazhou	ZUDA	DZH	4C	NTL	Civil	Dazhou Jinya Airport
Ganzi (Ganzi)	ZUGZ	GZG	4C	NTL	Civil	Ganzi Gesaer Airport
Guangyuan	ZUGU	GYS	4C	NTL	Civil	Guangyuan Panlong Airport
Jiuzhaigou (Aba)	ZUJZ	JZH	4D	NTL	Civil	Jiuzhai Huanglong Airport
Kangding (Ganzi)	ZUKD	KGT	4C	NTL	Civil	Ganzi Kangding Airport
Langzhong (Nanchong)	ZULA	LZG	4C	NTL	Civil	Langzhong Gucheng Airport
Luzhou	ZULZ	LZO	4C	NTL	Joint civil/military	Luzhou Yunlong Airport
Mianyang	ZUMY	MIG	4D	NTL	Joint civil/military	Mianyang Nanjiao Airport
Nanchong	ZUNC	NAO	4C	NTL	Joint civil/military	Nanchong Gaoping Airport
Panzhihua	ZUZH	PZI	4C	NTL	Civil	Panzhihua Baoanying Airport
Xichang (Liangshan)	ZUXC	XIC	4D	NTL	Joint civil/military	Xichang Qingshan Airport
Yibin	ZUYB	YBP	4C	NTL	Joint civil/military	Yibin Wuliangye Airport
Leshan	-	LSG	4C	NTL	Under construction	Leshan Airport
TIANJIN
Tianjin	ZBTJ	TSN	4E	INTL	Civil	Tianjin Binhai International Airport
TIBET
Changdu	ZUBD	BPX	4C	NTL	Joint civil/military	Changdu Bangda Airport
Dingri (Rikaze)	ZUDR	DDR	4C	NTL	Civil	Rikaze Dingri Airport
Gar (Ali)	ZUAL	NGQ	4D	NTL	Joint civil/military	Ali Kunsha Airport
Lhasa	ZULS	LXA	4E	INTL	Joint civil/military	Lhasa Konggar International Airport
Linzhi	ZUNZ	LZY	4D	NTL	Joint civil/military	Linzhi Milin Airport
Longzi (Shannan)	ZUSH	LGZ	4C	NTL	Civil	Shannan Longzi Airport
Pulan (Ali)	ZUPL	APJ	4C	NTL	Civil	Ali Pulan Airport
Rikaze	ZURK	RKZ	4C	NTL	Joint civil/military	Rikaze Peace Airport
XINJIANG
Akesu (Akesu)	ZWAK	AKU	4C	NTL	Joint civil/military	Akesu Hongqipo Airport
Alaer	ZWAL	ACF	4C	NTL	Civil	Alaer Talimu Airport
Aletai (Aletai)	ZWAT	AAT	4C	NTL	Civil	Aletai Xuedu Airport
Balikun (Hami)	ZWLK	DHH	4C	NTL	Civil	Balikun Dahe Airport
Bole (Bo'ertala)	ZWBL	BPL	4C	NTL	Civil	Bole Alashankou Airport
Bu'erjin (Aletai)	ZWKN	KJI	4C	NTL	Civil	Bu'erjin Kanasi Airport
Fuyun (Aletai)	ZWFY	FYN	4C	NTL	Joint civil/military	Fuyun Keketuohai Airport
Hami	ZWHM	HMI	4C	NTL	Joint civil/military	Hami Yizhou Airport
Hejing (Bayingolin)	ZWHJ	HJB	4C	NTL	Civil	Hejing Bayinbuluke Airport
Hetian (Hetian)	ZWTN	HTN	4D	NTL	Joint civil/military	Hetian Kungang Airport
Kashi (Kashi)	ZWSH	KHG	4E	INTL	Joint civil/military	Kashi Laining International Airport
Kelamayi	ZWKM	KRY	4D	NTL	Civil	Kelamayi Guhai Airport
Ku'erle (Bayingolin)	ZWKL	KRL	4D	NTL	Joint civil/military	Ku'erle Licheng Airport
Kuqa (Akesu)	ZWKC	KCA	4C	NTL	Civil	Kuqa Qiuci Airport
Qiemo (Bayingolin)	ZWCM	IQM	4C	NTL	Joint civil/military	Qiemo Yudu Airport
Qitai (Changji)	ZWQT	JBK	4C	NTL	Civil	Qitai Jiangbulake Airport
Ruoqiang (Bayingolin)	ZWRQ	RQA	4C	NTL	Civil	Ruoqiang Loulan Airport
Shache (Kashi)	ZWSC	QSZ	4C	NTL	Civil	Shache Ye'erqiang Airport
Shihezi	ZWHZ	SHF	4C	NTL	Civil	Shihezi Huayuan Airport
Tacheng (Tacheng)	ZWTC	TCG	4C	NTL	Civil	Tacheng Qianquan Airport
Tashiku'ergan (Kashi)	ZWTK	HQL	4C	NTL	Joint civil/military	Tashiku'ergan Hongqilafu Airport
Tumushuke	ZWTS	TWC	4C	NTL	Civil	Tumushuke Tangwangcheng Airport
Turpan	ZWTP	TLQ	4E	NTL	Civil	Turpan Jiaohe Airport
Ürümqi	ZWWW	URC	4F	INTL	Civil	Ürümqi Tianshan International Airport
Xinyuan (Yili)	ZWNL	NLT	4C	NTL	Civil	Xinyuan Nalati Airport
Yining (Yili)	ZWYN	YIN	4C	INTL	Civil	Ili Yining International Airport
Yutian (Hetian)	ZWYT	YTW	4C	NTL	Joint civil/military	Yutian Wanfang Airport
Zhaosu (Yili)	ZWZS	ZFL	4C	NTL	Civil	Zhaosu Tianma Airport
YUNNAN
Baoshan	ZPBS	BSD	4C	NTL	Civil	Baoshan Yunrui Airport
Cangyuan (Lincang)	ZPCW	CWJ	4C	NTL	Civil	Cangyuan Washan Airport
Dali (Dali)	ZPDL	DLU	4C	NTL	Civil	Dali Fengyi Airport
Jinghong (Xishuangbanna)	ZPJH	JHG	4D	INTL	Civil	Xishuangbanna Gasa International Airport
Kunming	ZPPP	KMG	4F	INTL	Civil	Kunming Changshui International Airport
Lancang (Pu'er)	ZPJM	JMJ	4C	NTL	Civil	Lancang Jingmai Airport
Lijiang	ZPLJ	LJG	4D	INTL	Civil	Lijiang Sanyi International Airport
Lincang	ZPLC	LNJ	4C	NTL	Civil	Lincang Boshang Airport
Mangshi (Dehong)	ZPMS	LUM	4C	INTL	Civil	Dehong Mangshi International Airport
Ninglang (Lijiang)	ZPNL	NLH	4C	NTL	Civil	Ninglang Luguhu Airport
Pu'er	ZPSM	SYM	4C	NTL	Joint civil/military	Pu'er Simao Airport
Shangri-La (Diqing)	ZPDQ	DIG	4D	NTL	Civil	Diqing Shangri-La Airport
Tengchong (Baoshan)	ZPTC	TCZ	4C	NTL	Civil	Tengchong Tuofeng Airport
Wenshan (Wenshan)	ZPWS	WNH	4C	NTL	Civil	Wenshan Yanshan Airport
Zhaotong	ZPZT	ZAT	4C	NTL	Joint civil/military	Zhaotong Airport
Mengzi (Honghe)	-	-	4C	NTL	Under construction	Honghe Mengzi Airport
Zhaotong	ZPZT	ZAT	4C	NTL	Under construction	Zhaotong Zhaoyang Airport
ZHEJIANG
Hangzhou	ZSHC	HGH	4F	INTL	Civil	Hangzhou Xiaoshan International Airport
Jiaxing	ZSJX	JNH	4E	NTL	Joint civil/military	Jiaxing Nanhu Airport
Lishui	ZSLI	LIJ	4C	NTL	Civil	Lishui Airport
Ningbo	ZSNB	NGB	4E	INTL	Civil	Ningbo Lishe International Airport
Quzhou	ZSJU	JUZ	4C	NTL	Joint civil/military	Quzhou Airport
Taizhou	ZSLQ	HYN	4C	NTL	Joint civil/military	Taizhou Luqiao Airport
Wenzhou	ZSWZ	WNZ	4E	INTL	Civil	Wenzhou Longwan International Airport
Yiwu (Jinhua)	ZSYW	YIW	4D	INTL	Joint civil/military	Yiwu Airport
Zhoushan	ZSZS	HSN	4D	INTL	Civil	Zhoushan Putuoshan International Airport

== Certified general airports ==
Main city served	Type	IATA	ARC	Licence codes	Airport name
Licence codes in the new rules
Anji (Huzhou)	A1	-	2C	T13820223002000	Anji Tianzihu Airport
Bairin Right Banner (Chifeng)	A1	-	2B	T13820231003500	Bairin Right Banner Daban Airport
Baotou	A1	-	2B	T13820211000500	Baotou Wudangzhao Airport
Beichuan (Mianyang)	A1	-	2B	T13820235004300	Beichuan Yongchang Airport
Beitun	A1	-	2B	T13820237002900	Beitun Fengqing Airport
Binzhou	A1	CBZ	4C	T13820213000400	Binzhou Dagao Airport
Chengdu	A1	HZU	2B	T13820215000600	Chengdu Huaizhou Airport
Danzhou	A2	-	-	T13820234003900	Danzhou Xiqing Airport
Damao Banner (Baotou)	A1	BKV	2B	T13820211001100	Damao Bailingmiao Airport
Datong	A1	-	3C	T13820211001000	Datong Nanliuzhuang Airport
Dengfeng (Zhengzhou)	A2	-	1B	T13820224001700	Dengfeng Shaolin Airport
Deqing (Huzhou)	A1	DEQ	1B	T13820223002100	Deqing Moganshan Airport
Feidong (Hefei)	A1	-	2B	T13820233003300	Feidong Bailong Airport
Fengqing (Lincang)	A1	-	2B	T13820235003600	Fengqing Zhonghe Airport
Fuyu (Qiqihar)	A1	-	2B	T13820232004100	Fuyu Taha Airport
Genhe (Hulunbuir)	A1	-	2B	T13820221001600	Genhe Aoluguya Airport
Gongqingcheng (Jiujiang)	A1	-	2B	T13820233004000	Gongqingcheng Nanhu Airport
Huachi (Qingyang)	A1	-	2B	T13820236003400	Huachi Nanliang Airport
Jalaid Banner (Hinggan)	A1	-	2B	T13820221002300	Jalaid Banner Yindeer Airport
Jinan	A1	-	2B	T13820223001300	Jinan Shanghe Airport
Jingbian (Yulin)	A1	-	3C	T13820216000900	Jingbian Haizetan Airport
Laixi (Qingdao)	A1	-	2B	T13820203000300	Laixi Dianbu Airport
Liyang (Changzhou)	A1	-	1B	T13820223000801	Liyang Changdanghu Airport
Loudi	A2	-	2B	T13820244004600	Loudi Qiaotouhe Airport
Mile (Honghe)	A1	-	2B	T13820215000700	Mile Dongfeng Airport
Minqin (Wuwei)	A1	-	3B	T13820236004400	Minqin Suwu Airport
Orku (Karamay)	A1	WRH	3B	T13820227001500	Orku Baikouquan Airport
Otog Banner (Ordos)	A1	OTO	2B	T13820231002800	Otog Banner Wulan Airport
Otog Front Banner (Ordos)	A1	OTQ	3C	T13820231002600	Otog Front Banner Oljoq Airport
Qingdao	A1	-	2B	T13820233004200	Qingdao Jimo Airport
Qixia (Yantai)	A1	-	2B	T13820223001200	Qixia Yangchu Airport
Ruicheng (Yuncheng)	A1	-	2B	T13820231003200	Ruicheng Xinnanzhang Airport
Shenmu (Yulin)	A1	-	2B	T13820226002400	Shenmu Xisha Airport
Suining	A1	-	4C	T13820235003800	Suining Anju Airport
Taiyuan	A1	TYC	3C	T13820231003700	Taiyuan Yaocheng Airport
Tuquan (Hinggan)	A1	-	2B	T13820221002200	Tuquan Taiping Airport
Urad Middle Banner (Bayannur)	A1	WZQ	2B	T13820221001400	Urad Middle Banner Hailiutu Airport
Uxin Banner (Ordos)	A1	WSQ	2B	T13820231002700	Uxin Banner Galutu Airport
Wuhan	A1	WHN	2B	T13820234002501	Wuhan Hannan Airport
Wuxi	A1	-	2B	T13820223001800	Wuxi Dingshu Airport
Xiantao	A1	-	1B	T13820224001900	Xiantao Changtangkou Airport
Zhuhai	A1	-	1B	T13820234003100	Zhuhai Jiuzhou Airport
Zhushan (Shiyan)	A1	-	2B	T13820234004500	Zhushan Majiadu Airport
Zhuzhou	A1	-	1B	T13820204000200	Zhuzhou Lusong Airport
Licence codes in the original rules (lack of standardisation of airport name)
Ar Horqin Banner (Chifeng)	A1	AEQ	2B	GA2018NC0071OI	Ar Horqin Airport
Arun Banner (Hulunbuir)	A1	-	2B	GA2019NC0087OI	Arun Airport
Baoji	A3	-	2B	GA2020NW0107OI	Baoji Taibaishan Airport
Beijing	A1	-	-	GA2018NC0049OI	Beijing Badaling Airport
Beijing	A1	-	-	GA2018NC0050OI	Beijing Miyun Mujiayu General Airport
Beijing	A1	-	1A	GA2018NC0057OI	Beijing Haidian Airport
Bordered Yellow Banner (Xilingol)	A1	-	2B	GA2020NC0104OI	Bordered Yellow Banner New Bulag Airport
Cangzhou	A1	-	2B	GA2018NC0074OI	Hebei Cangzhou Zhongjie General Airport
Changsha	A2	-	1A	GA2019CS0095OI	Hunan Changsha Kaihui General Airport
Chongqing	A1	-	1B	GA2017SW0008OI	Chongqing Longxing General Airport
Chongqing	A1	LIA	-	GA2020SW0111OI	Chongqing Liangping Airport
Danfeng (Shangluo)	A1	DFA	2B	GA2018NW0058OI	Danfeng Shangzhen General Airport
Dongfang	A1	-	2B	GA2020CS0103OI	Dongfang Datian Airport
Dongyang (Jinhua)	A1	HEW	2B	GA2017EC0026R1	Dongyang Hengdian General Airport
Dunhuang (Jiuquan)	A1	-	-	GA2018NW0077OI	Dunhuang Mingshashan General Airport
Dunhuang (Jiuquan)	A1	-	-	GA2020NW0101OI	Dunhuang Yadan Airport
Guanghan (Deyang)	A1	GHN	4C	GA2018SW0060OI	Guanghan Airport
Harbin	A1	PFA	4C	GA2020NE0110OI	Harbin Pingfang Airport
Hengyang	A2	-	-	GA2020CS0109OI	Hengyang Dapu Airport
Huangping (Qiandongnan)	A2	-	2B	GA2018SW0084OI	Huangping Jiuzhou Airport
Jiagedaqi (Daxing'anling)	A1	JGD	4C	GA2020NE0105OI	Jiagedaqi Guangming Airport
Jiamusi	A1	-	2C	GA2018NE0041OI	Jiamusi Sanhetun General Airport
Ji'an	A3	-	2B	GA2017EC0021OI	Ji'an Tongping General Airport
Jiande (Hangzhou)	A1	JDE	1B	GA2017EC0018R1	Jiande Qiandaohu General Airport
Jingmen	A1	-	3B	GA2017CS0007OI	Jingmen Zhanghe Airport
Laiwu (Jinan)	A2	-	1B	GA2017EC0022OI	Laiwu Xueye General Airport
Lanping (Nujiang)	A1	LFH	2B	GA2019SW0098OI	Lanping Fenghua General Airport
Longchuan (Dehong)	A1	LCS	2B	GA2020SW0113OI	Longchuan Guangsong Airport
Luoding (Yunfu)	A1	-	3B	GA2017CS0010OI	Luoding Airport
Morin Dawa Banner (Hulunbuir)	A1	DWS	2B	GA2018NC0081OI	Morin Dawa Banner Airport
Nanchang	A1	-	4D	GA2018EC0083OI	Nanchang Yaohu Airport
Nenjiang (Heihe)	A1	NJJ	2B	GA2018NE0070OI	Nenjiang Melgen Airport
New Barag Right Banner (Hulunbuir)	A1	XRQ	2B	GA2017NC0019OI	New Barag Right Banner Bogd Airport
Panjin	A3	-	1B	GA2017NE0017R1	Panjin Chenjia General Airport
Penglai (Yantai)	A1	PNJ	2B	GA2017EC0023OI	Penglai Shahekou Airport
Pingquan (Chengde)	A1	-	2B	GA2017NC0006OI	Hebei Pingquan Airport
Pucheng (Weinan)	A1	-	2B	GA2018NW0048OI	Pucheng Neifu General Airport
Qingdao	A1	-	1B	GA2020EC0102OI	Qingdao Cihang Airport
Raohe (Shuangyashan)	A3	-	-	GA2019NE0099OI	Raohe Bawujiu Farm Airport
Rizhao	A2	-	2B	GA2019EC0093OI	Rizhao City Lanshan General Airport
Shanghai	A2	-	-	GA2019EC0091OI	Shanghai Jinshan Water Airport
Shenyang	A2	-	2B	GA2017NE0005OI	Shenyang Faku Caihu Airport
Shijiazhuang	A1	LCT	3B	GA2017NC0017OI	Shijiazhuang Luancheng Airport
Tianjin	A1	-	-	GA2018NC0052OI	Tianjin Binhai Douzhuang General Airport
Tianjin	A1	-	1B	GA2018NC0053OI	Tianjin Tanggu Airport
Weichang (Chengde)	A1	-	2B	GA2020NC0106OI	Weichang Yudaokou Airport
Wudalianchi (Heihe)	A3	-	-	GA2018NE0046R1	Wudalianchi Longzhen General Airport
Xinchang (Shaoxing)	A1	-	1B	GA2018EC0073OI	Xinchang Wanfeng General Airport
Xinjin (Chengdu)	A1	-	2C	GA2018SW0062OI	Xinjin Airport
Xinyi (Xuzhou)	A1	-	2B	GA2020EC0100OI	Xinyi Qipan Airport
Xuzhou	A1	-	1B	GA2017EC0027OI	Xuzhou Yangmiao Agricultural Airport
Yancheng	A1	-	1A	GA2018EC0066OI	Yancheng Jianhu General Airport
Yancheng	A1	-	-	GA2018EC0069OI	Yancheng Sheyang General Airport
Yangjiang	A1	-	1A	GA2017CS0014OI	Yangjiang Heshan Airport
Yongchuan (Chongqing)	A1	YGA	2B	GA2019SW0092OI	Yongchuan Da'an General Airport
Yuhong (Shenyang)	A3	-	-	GA2018NE0042OI	Yuhong Quansheng General Airport
Yushu (Changchun)	A1	-	-	GA2018NE0059OI	Yushu General Airport
Zhangye	A1	-	2B	GA2017NW0015OI	Zhangye Danxia General Airport
Zhaodong (Suihua)	A1	HLJ	3C	GA2018NE0040OI	Zhaodong Beidahuang General Airport
Zhenjiang	A1	AZJ	1B	GA2017EC0024OI	Zhenjiang Dalu General Airport
Zhuhai	A1	-	2B	GA2019CS0086OI	Zhuhai Lianzhou General Airport
Zigong	A1	ZKL	2B	GA2017SW0025OI	Zigong Fengming General Airport

== See also ==
- List of defunct airports in China
- List of the busiest airports in China
- List of People's Liberation Army Air Force airbases
- List of airports in Hong Kong
- List of airports in Shanghai
- List of busiest airports by passenger traffic
- List of airports by ICAO code: Z
