= Yushui =

Yushui may refer to:

- Yushui (solar term) (雨水), 2nd solar term of the traditional East Asian calendars

== Places in China ==
- Yushui District (渝水区), a district in Xinyu, Jiangxi
- Yushui Subdistrict (玉水街道), a subdistrict of Dejiang County, Guizhou
- Yushui, Dushan County (玉水), a town in Dushan County, Guizhou
- Yushui Township (雨水乡), a township in Puge County, Sichuan
