= Pingyuan =

Pingyuan may refer to:

== Places ==
- Pingyuan Province (平原省), a short-lived former province of China
- Pingyuan Prefecture (平远州), a former name of Zhijin, Guizhou, China
- Pingyuan County, Guangdong (平远县), of Meizhou, Guangdong
- Pingyuan County, Shandong (平原县), of Dezhou, Shandong
  - Pingyuan Commandery, a historic commandery
- Pingyuan, Pingtan County (平原镇), town in Pingtan County, Fujian
- Pingyuan, Yingjiang County (平原镇), town in Yingjiang County, Yunnan
- Pingyuan Township, Dejiang County (平原乡), in Dejiang County, Guizhou
- Pingyuan Township, Xinxiang (平原乡), in Weibin District, Xinxiang, Henan

== Other uses ==
- Lord Pingyuan (died 251 BC), one of the Four Lords of the Warring States
- Chinese gunboat Pingyuan, the first Chinese-built ironclad
