= Zhaotong Zhaoyang Airport =

Airport serving Zhaotong, Yunnan, China

Zhaotong Zhaoyang Airport 昭通昭阳机场
- IATA: ZAT; ICAO: ZPZT

Summary
- Airport type: Public
- Serves: Zhaotong
- Location: Zhaoyang, Zhaotong, Yunnan, China
- Coordinates: 27.2117°N 103.6993°E

Map
- Location of airport in Yunnan

Zhaotong Zhaoyang Airport (IATA: ZAT, ICAO: ZPZT) is an under-construction airport located in Zhaoyang district of Zhaotong City in Yunnan Province of Southwestern China. It was formerly called Zhaotong Hualuping Airport. Zhaotong Zhaoyang Airport is about to operate in 2024, replacing the existing Zhaotong Airport.

== See also ==
- List of airports in China
- List of the busiest airports in China
