= DEJ =

DEJ may stand for:

- Dermoepidermal junction, the interface between the dermis and the epidermis inside the skin
- Dentinoenamel junction, the interface between the dentin and the enamel inside a tooth
- Deferred entry of judgment, similar or equal to deferred adjudication in court cases
- Tongren Dejiang Airport (IATA code DEJ), an airport in China

== See also ==
- Dej, a city in Romania
