= Panzhou Guanshan Airport =

Panzhou Guanshan Airport 盘州官山机场
- IATA: none; ICAO: none

Summary
- Airport type: Public
- Serves: Panzhou, Guizhou, China
- Coordinates: 25.8822°N 104.6149°E

Map
- Location of airport in Guizhou

Panzhou Guanshan Airport is an under-construction airport located in Panzhou county-level city in Guizhou Province of Southwestern China. Panzhou Guanshan Airport is about to operate in 2025.

== See also ==
- List of airports in China
- List of the busiest airports in China
