= Dushan County =

Dushan County 独山县 Tuhshan
- County
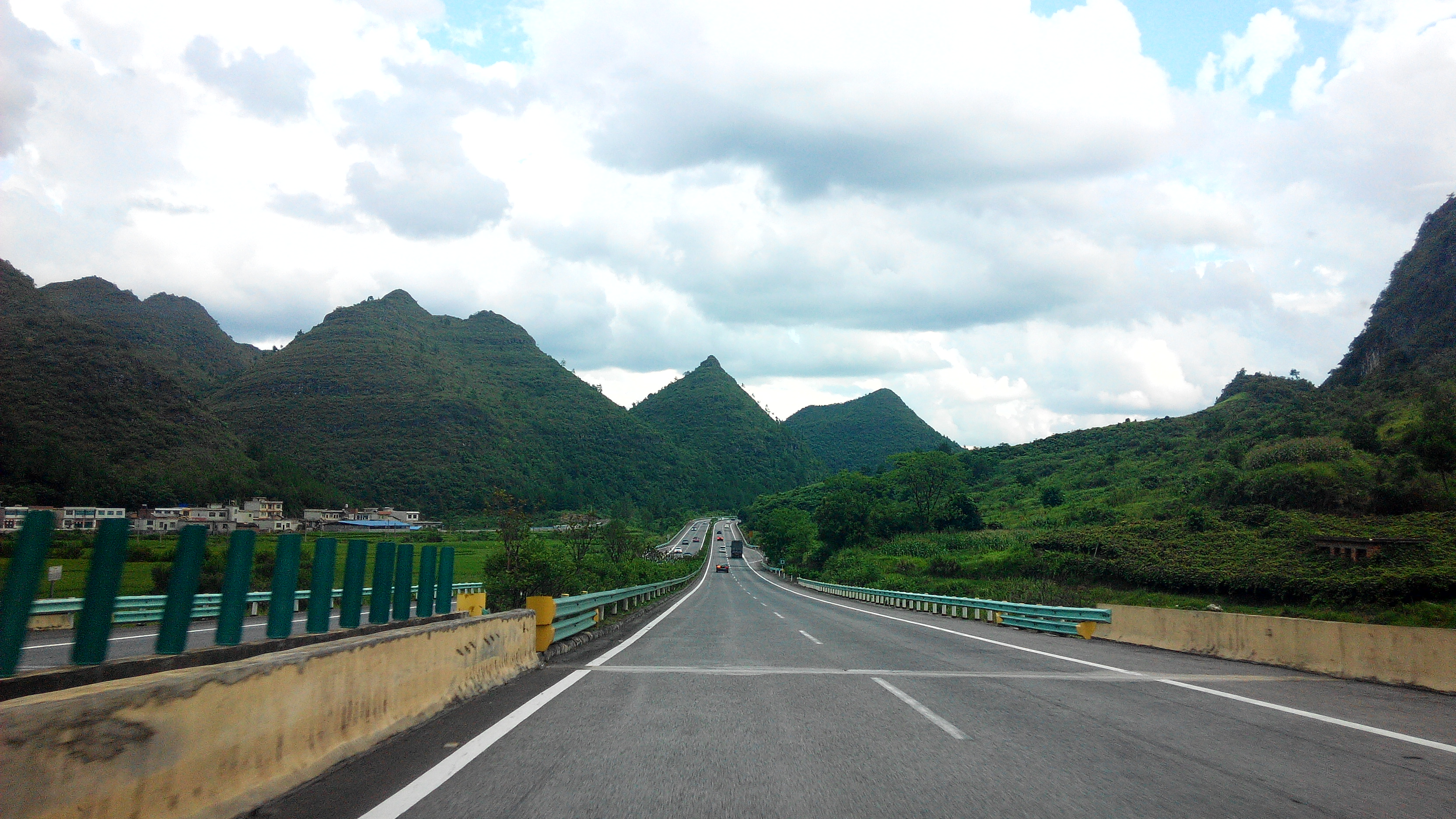

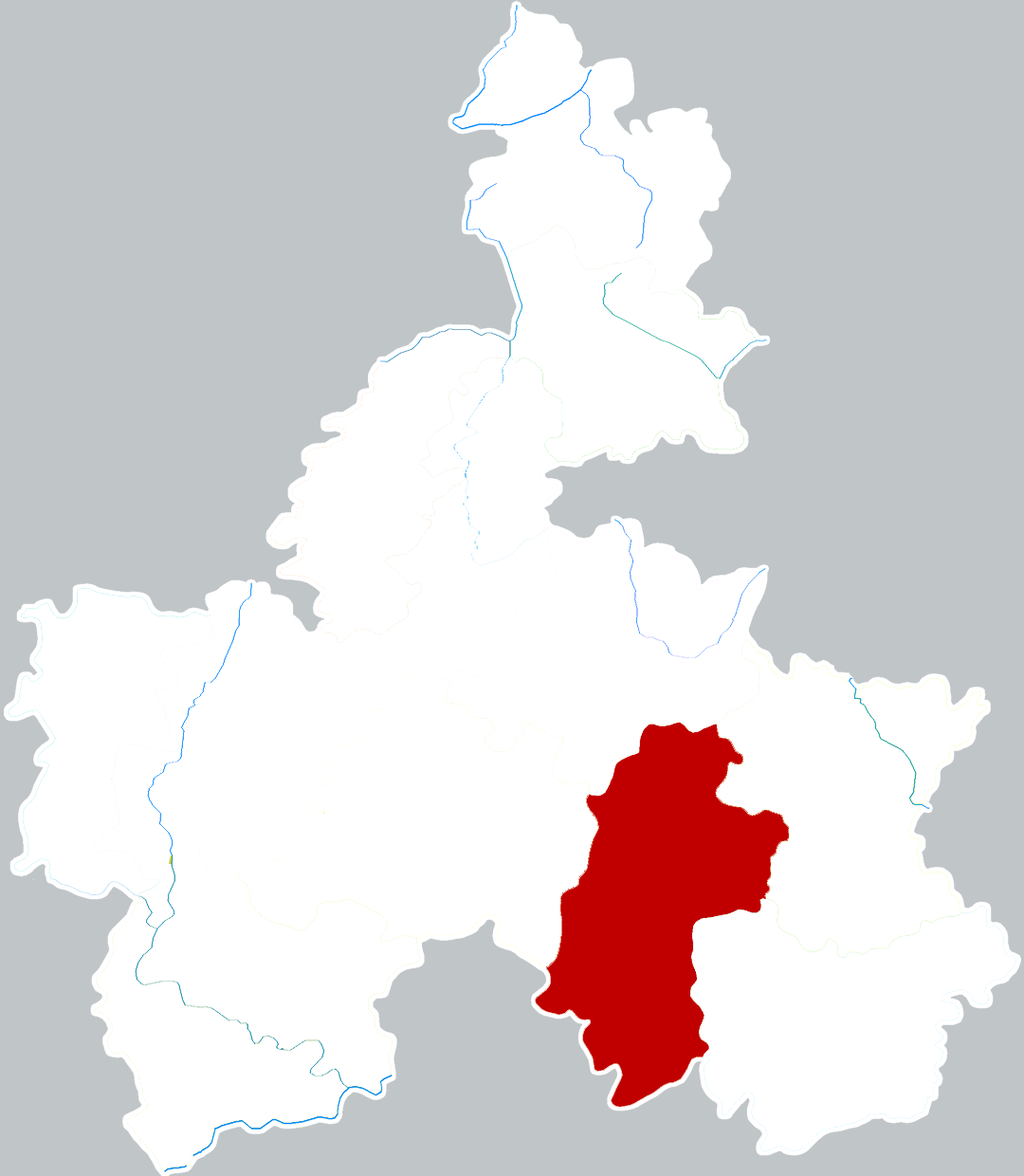

- Location of the seat in Guizhou Dushan (Southwest China)
- Coordinates (Dushan County government): 25°49′20″N 107°32′42″E
- Country: China
- Province: Guizhou
- Prefecture: Qiannan
- County seat: Baiquan

Area
  - Total: 2,442.2 km^{2} (942.9 sq mi)
- Elevation: 1,001 m (3,284 ft)

Population (2010)
  - Total: 265,083
  - Density: 108.54/km^{2} (281.12/sq mi)
- Time zone: UTC+8 (China Standard)
- Postal code: 558200
- Area code: 0854
- Website: http://www.dushan.gov.cn/

Dushan County (simplified Chinese: 独山县; traditional Chinese: 獨山縣; pinyin: Dúshān Xiàn; lit. 'independent mountain') is a county of 346,000 people (2007) in Guizhou province, China. It is under the administration of Qiannan Buyei and Miao Autonomous Prefecture, in the south of the province, bordering Guangxi to the south. The county seat is the town of Baiquan.

Dushan is located in a mountainous area, with elevations increasing from south to north. The primary river in the county is the Duliu River (都柳江), and the annual mean temperature is around 15 °C (59 °F) and there is total of 1,346 millimetres (52.99 in) of rainfall annually. Transportation links include the Guizhou–Guangxi Railway (黔桂铁路), the G75 Lanzhou–Haikou Expressway, China National Highways 210 and 312. Important natural attractions are Duxiu Mountain (独秀峰), Shenxian Cave (神仙洞) and Yuqing Caves (于清洞), and Ziquan Lake (紫泉湖).

== History ==
From 2016 to 2020, the county government spent 40 billion renminbi ($5.7 billion U.S. dollars) on construction projects. Amanda Lee of the South China Morning Post described these as "white elephant". Guan Video created a 22-minute film titled How Dushan Burnt 40 Billion (Chinese: 独山县如何烧掉400亿; pinyin: Dúshānxiàn rúhé shāo diào 400 yì), released on July 12, 2020. The copy on Sina Weibo had more than 27 million views by July 16.

== Administrative divisions ==
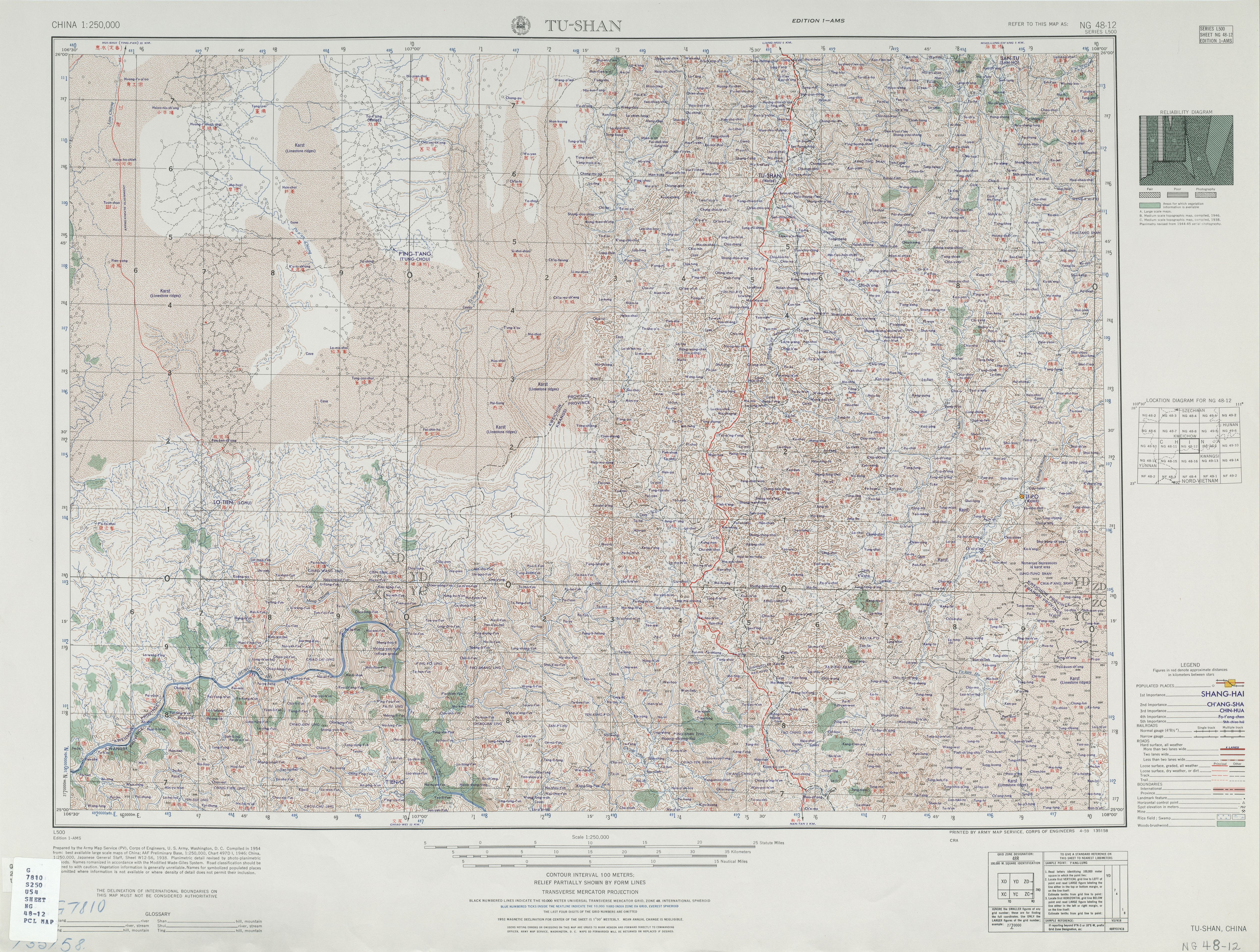
Map including Dushan (labeled as TU-SHAN (Walled) 獨山) (AMS, 1954)

Dushan County is divided into 1 subdistrict and 8 towns:

subdistricts

- Jingcheng 井城街道

towns

- Mawan 麻万镇
- Jichang 基长镇
- Shangsi 上司镇
- Xiasi 下司镇
- Mawei 麻尾镇
- Baiquan 百泉镇
- Yingshan 影山镇
- Yushui 玉水镇

== Climate ==
Climate data for Dushan, elevation 1,014 m (3,327 ft), (1991–2020 normals, extremes 1981–present)
Month	Jan	Feb	Mar	Apr	May	Jun	Jul	Aug	Sep	Oct	Nov	Dec	Year
Record high °C (°F)	21.9 (71.4)	28.5 (83.3)	31.1 (88.0)	32.4 (90.3)	32.2 (90.0)	32.1 (89.8)	33.4 (92.1)	33.8 (92.8)	32.9 (91.2)	30.1 (86.2)	27.8 (82.0)	24.9 (76.8)	33.8 (92.8)
Mean daily maximum °C (°F)	8.4 (47.1)	11.6 (52.9)	15.5 (59.9)	20.8 (69.4)	24.0 (75.2)	26.0 (78.8)	27.5 (81.5)	27.9 (82.2)	25.4 (77.7)	20.7 (69.3)	16.7 (62.1)	11.3 (52.3)	19.7 (67.4)
Daily mean °C (°F)	5.0 (41.0)	7.6 (45.7)	11.1 (52.0)	16.2 (61.2)	19.8 (67.6)	22.2 (72.0)	23.4 (74.1)	23.2 (73.8)	20.7 (69.3)	16.5 (61.7)	12.2 (54.0)	7.1 (44.8)	15.4 (59.8)
Mean daily minimum °C (°F)	2.7 (36.9)	5.0 (41.0)	8.4 (47.1)	13.1 (55.6)	16.7 (62.1)	19.7 (67.5)	20.8 (69.4)	20.0 (68.0)	17.5 (63.5)	13.6 (56.5)	9.2 (48.6)	4.4 (39.9)	12.6 (54.7)
Record low °C (°F)	−6.3 (20.7)	−5.8 (21.6)	−4.2 (24.4)	2.0 (35.6)	6.8 (44.2)	11.1 (52.0)	12.3 (54.1)	13.7 (56.7)	8.3 (46.9)	4.1 (39.4)	−4.2 (24.4)	−6.4 (20.5)	−6.4 (20.5)
Average precipitation mm (inches)	37.9 (1.49)	38.1 (1.50)	65.7 (2.59)	107.2 (4.22)	194.8 (7.67)	245.3 (9.66)	229.1 (9.02)	146.6 (5.77)	105.5 (4.15)	78.4 (3.09)	44.6 (1.76)	27.4 (1.08)	1,320.6 (52)
Average precipitation days (≥ 0.1 mm)	16.1	14.1	18.4	17.5	17.6	18.4	17.8	15.1	11.4	12.6	11.1	10.8	180.9
Average snowy days	2.9	1.5	0.3	0	0	0	0	0	0	0	0.1	0.8	5.6
Average relative humidity (%)	84	82	83	82	82	86	85	83	81	81	79	78	82
Mean monthly sunshine hours	38.7	50.1	65.5	89.6	102.7	82.4	126.7	152.8	122.3	92.2	91.0	70.2	1,084.2
Percentage possible sunshine	12	16	18	23	25	20	30	38	34	26	28	22	24
Source: China Meteorological Administration
