= Pu'er Simao Airport =

Coordinates: 22.79330°N 100.95900°E

Pu'er Simao Airport 普洱思茅机场
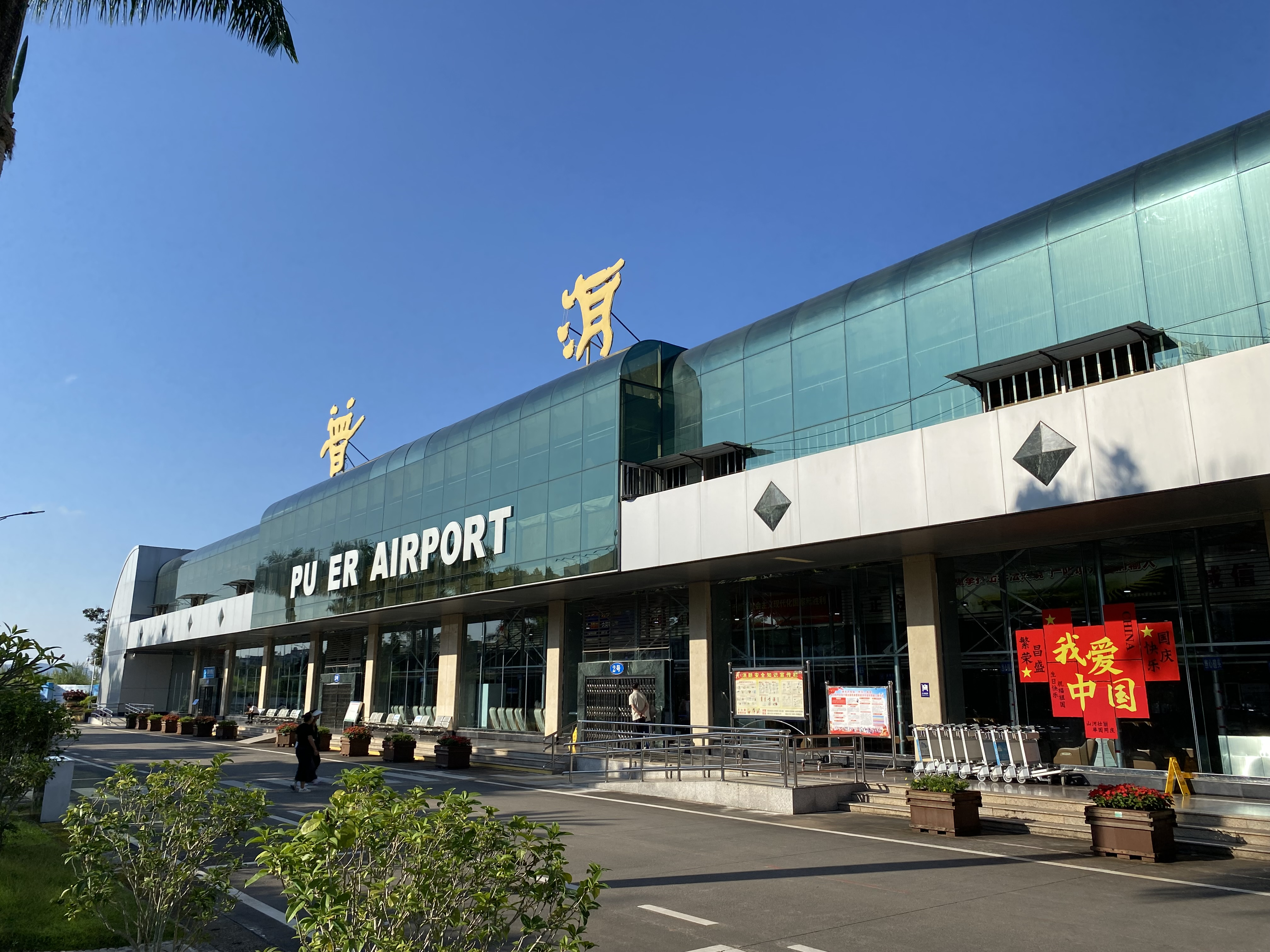
- IATA: SYM; ICAO: ZPSM

Summary
- Airport type: Public
- Serves: Pu'er, Yunnan, China

Map
- Location of airport in Yunnan

Runways
Direction	Length		Surface
Direction	m	ft	Surface
18/36	2,470	8,104

Statistics (2021)
- Passengers: 577,917
- Aircraft movements: 8,311
- Cargo (metric tons): 1,167.2
- Source: CAAC

Pu'er Simao Airport
- Simplified Chinese: 普洱思茅机场
- Traditional Chinese: 普洱思茅機場
Transcriptions
Standard Mandarin
- Hanyu Pinyin: Pǔ'ěr Sīmáo Jīchǎng

Pu'er Simao Airport (IATA: SYM, ICAO: ZPSM) is an airport serving the city of Pu'er in Yunnan Province, China.

== Airlines and destinations ==
Airlines	Destinations
Colorful Guizhou Airlines	Chengdu–Tianfu
Tibet Airlines	Changsha, Chongqing, Xi'an, Zhaotong

== See also ==
- List of airports in China
