= Hejing Bayinbuluke Airport =

Hejing Bayinbuluke Airport 和静巴音布鲁克机场
- IATA: HJB; ICAO: ZWHJ

Summary
- Airport type: Public
- Serves: Bayingolin, Xinjiang, China
- Coordinates: 42.9766°N 83.9729°E

Map
- Location of airport in Xinjiang

Runways
Direction	Length		Surface
Direction	m	ft	Surface
06/24	3,000	9,843

Hejing Bayinbuluke Airport
- Simplified Chinese: 和静巴音布鲁克机场
- Traditional Chinese: 和靜巴音布魯克機場
Transcriptions
Standard Mandarin
- Hanyu Pinyin: Héjìng Bāyīnbùlǔkè Jīchǎng

Hejing Bayinbuluke Airport (IATA: HJB, ICAO: ZWHJ) is an airport located in Hejing county of Bayingolin Prefecture in Xinjiang autonomous region of Northwestern China. It was formerly called "Bayinbuluke (Hejing) Airport". The airport opened on August 20, 2024.

== See also ==
- List of airports in China
- List of the busiest airports in China
