= Tongren Dejiang Airport =

Tongren Dejiang Airport 铜仁德江机场
- IATA: DEJ; ICAO: ZUDJ

Summary
- Airport type: Public
- Serves: Dejiang, Guizhou, China
- Opened: 18 May 2026; 3 months ago
- Coordinates: 28.1210°N 108.1631°E

Map
- Location of airport in Guizhou

Runways
Direction	Length		Surface
Direction	m	ft	Surface
-	2,800	9,186	-

Tongren Dejiang Airport (Chinese: 铜仁德江机场) is an airport located in Dejiang county of Tongren City in Guizhou Province of Southwestern China. It formerly called "Qianbei (Dejiang) Airport". Tongren Dejiang Airport is opened on 18 May 2026. This will be the 12th civil aviation airport in Guizhou Province and the second in Tongren City. The inaugural flight route will be to Guiyang operated by Colorful Guizhou Airlines.

In the first week of inaugural flight (From 18 May to 24 May 2026), air tickets are as low as 50% off, from 150 RMB for one way. The discount only applied for local residents at Dejiang County with valid ID.

== Facilities ==
Construction began on 19 May 2022, with a total investment of 2.1478 billion RMB. The current phase of project is designed to handle 550,000 passengers and 1,350 tons of cargo annually. The airport covers an area of approximately 285 hectares, has classified 4C rating with a 2,800-meter runway and 45 meters wide which are able to handle almost aircraft models such as Airbus A320, Boeing 737 and below, a 7,000-square-meter terminal building, and six aircraft stands.

Once the airport is officially opened, it planned to open routes to major cities such as Beijing, Shanghai, Guangzhou, Guiyang, Chongqing, and Chengdu.

== Airlines and Destinations ==
Airlines	Destinations
Colorful Guizhou Airlines	Guiyang

== See also ==
- List of airports in China
- List of the busiest airports in China
