= Hainanzhou Gonghe Airport =

Hainanzbou Gonghe Airport 海南州共和机场
- IATA: HNG; ICAO: none

Summary
- Airport type: Public
- Serves: Gonghe, Hainan Prefecture, Qinghai, China
- Coordinates: 36.3368°N 100.4761°E

Map
- Location of airport in Qinghai

Hainanzhou Gonghe Airport (Chinese: 海南州共和机场; pinyin: Hǎinánzhōu Gònghé Jīchǎng) is an under-construction airport located in Gonghe county, Hainan Prefecture, Qinghai Province, Northwestern China. It is about to operate in 2026.

== See also ==
- List of airports in China
- List of the busiest airports in China
