= Chahe, Weining County =

Chahe 岔河镇
- Town
- Location in Guizhou
- Coordinates: 26°42′6″N 103°52′24″E
- Country: People's Republic of China
- Province: Guizhou
- Prefecture-level city: Bijie
- Autonomous county: Weining Yi, Hui, and Miao Autonomous County
- Time zone: UTC+8 (China Standard)

Chahe (Chinese: 岔河; pinyin: Chàhé) is a town in Weining Yi, Hui, and Miao Autonomous County, Bijie, Guizhou. As of 2020, it administers the following five residential communities and twelve villages:

- Chahe Community
- Jinzhong Community (金钟社区)
- Yingjiang Community (迎江社区)
- Libi Community (利毕社区)
- Yinchang Community (银厂社区)
- Xin Village (新村)
- Dahong Village (大洪村)
- Shaying Village (沙营村)
- Xinfa Village (新发村)
- Xinguang Village (新光村)
- Qiaxi Village (恰西村)
- Longtoushan Village (龙头山村)
- Xinlu Village (新炉村)
- Haiping Village (海坪村)
- Sanyi Village (三益村)
- Yunsha Village (云沙村)
- Hanba Village (汗坝村)

== See also ==
- List of township-level divisions of Guizhou
