= Weining Caohai Airport =

Weining Caohai Airport 威宁草海机场
- IATA: WNJ; ICAO: ZUWN

Summary
- Serves: Weining County, Guizhou, China
- Coordinates: 26.85°N 104.33°E

Map

Runways
Direction	Length		Surface
Direction	ft	m	Surface
		3,000

Weining Caohai Airport is an under-construction airport in Weining County, Bijie, Guizhou, China. The airport is named after the Caohai Lake and nature reserve in Weining.

Construction started in March 2019 at a cost of 1,800 million yuan, of which 1,064 million was financed by the national government, and 550 million by Guizhou province, with the remaining amount not yet accounted for. Test flights are expected to commence in the second half of 2023.

The airport will have a single 3,000 m (9,800 ft) runway and facilities to handle up to 350,000 passengers yearly.

== See also ==
- Bijie Feixiong Airport
