= List of airports in Shanghai =

This is a list of airports in Shanghai, China, including defunct airports and military air bases. As of January 2013, there were two commercial airports, three military and government airports and some rooftop helipads.

== Airports ==
ICAO	IATA	Airport name	Current Status
ZSSS	SHA	Shanghai Hongqiao International Airport	Active, Civil
ZSPD	PVG	Shanghai Pudong International Airport	Active, Civil
~~ZSSL~~	none	Longhua Airport	Defunct, Civil, Military
none	none	Dachang Air Base	Active, Military
none	none	Jiangwan Airport	Defunct, Military
none	none	Chongming Air Base	Active, Military
none	none	Gaodong Maritime Salvage Airport	Active, Government

== See also ==
- List of airports in China
