= Yushui Subdistrict =

Yushui Subdistrict 玉水街道
- Subdistrict
- Location within Guizhou Location within China
- Coordinates: 28.2606°N 108.1154°E
- Country: People's Republic of China
- Province: Guizhou
- Prefecture-level city: Tongren
- County: Dejiang County
- Time zone: UTC+8 (China Standard)

Yushui Subdistrict (Chinese: 玉水街道; pinyin: Yùshuǐ Jiēdào) is a subdistrict in Dejiang County, Guizhou, China. As of 2018, it has 7 residential communities and 6 villages under its administration.

== See also ==
- List of township-level divisions of Guizhou
