= Zhaotong Airport =

Airport in Zhaotong, Yunnan, China

Zhaotong Airport 昭通机场
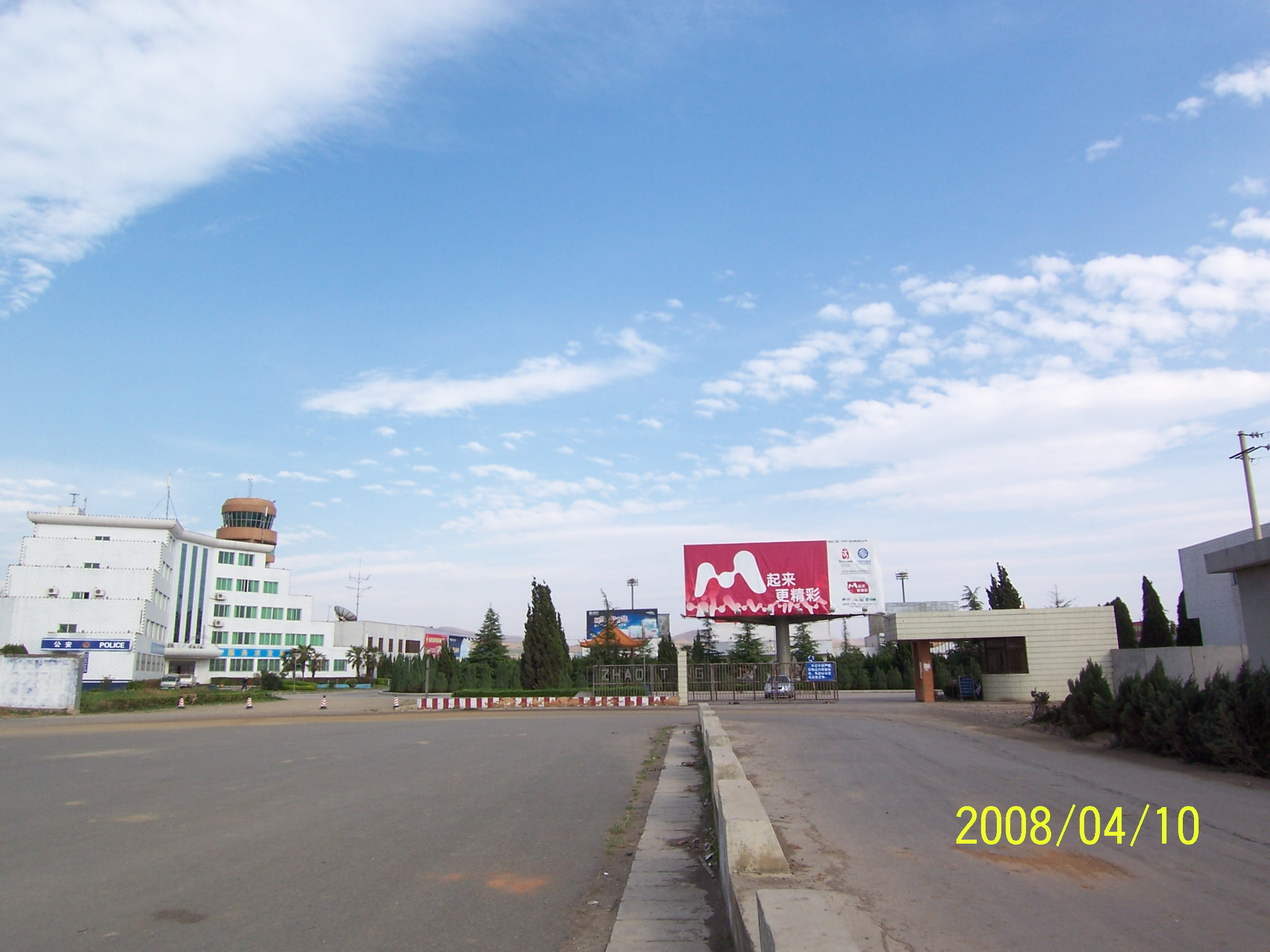
- IATA: ZAT; ICAO: ZPZT

Summary
- Airport type: Public
- Serves: Zhaotong, Yunnan
- Opened: 1935; 91 years ago
- Coordinates: 27°19′40″N 103°45′24″E

Map
- Location of airport in Yunnan

Runways
Direction	Length		Surface
Direction	m	ft	Surface
04/22	2,600	8,530	Asphalt

Statistics (2025)
- Passengers: 454,690
- Aircraft movements: 5,396
- Cargo (metric tons): 2,031.4
- Source: List of the busiest airports in the People's Republic of China

Zhaotong Airport
- Simplified Chinese: 昭通机场
- Traditional Chinese: 昭通機場
Transcriptions
Standard Mandarin
- Hanyu Pinyin: Zhāotōng Jīchǎng

Zhaotong Airport (IATA: ZAT, ICAO: ZPZT) is an airport serving the city of Zhaotong in Southwestern China's Yunnan province.

== History ==
Zhaotong Airport was first built in 1935. During the War of Resistance Against Japan, it served as a rear-area military airport and an important hub for the "Hump" airlift route. It has seen B-29 heavy bombers take off and land, making significant contributions to the victory of the war.

In 1950, Zhaotong Airport was converted into a joint military-civilian airport. In 1968, the Kunming-Zhaotong route was opened, accommodating Il-14 aircraft. In February 1983, the Kunming-Zhaotong route was suspended due to outdated facilities and aircraft at Zhaotong Airport. In 1986, Zhaotong Airport was completely shut down.

On May 15, 1987, the Leading Group for the Renovation of Zhaotong Airport was established. In November 1990, the Central Military Commission, the General Staff Department, and the State Planning Commission approved the expansion and renovation of Zhaotong Airport. On December 1, 1990, the Zhaotong Airport Expansion Leading Group was established.

The groundbreaking ceremony for the expansion project was held on November 20, 1991. On May 14, 1993, the 2,600-meter-long airport runway was completed. On November 12, a Boeing 737-300 aircraft, which took off from Kunming Airport, landed at Zhaotong Airport for the first time.

On December 20, 1993, Zhaotong Airport held a ceremony to celebrate the completion of the expansion and renovation project and its inaugural flight. On November 20, 1994, after an 11-year hiatus in civil aviation operations, flights resumed. However, at that time, only the Kunming-Zhaotong route was operated, with a small number of flights and limited operational capacity.

In 2009, the relocation and reconstruction of Zhaotong Airport officially began. In July and September 2013, the Chinese Air Force and the Civil Aviation Administration of China respectively approved Zhaojiaxiaochong in Zhaoyang District as the site for the relocation of Zhaotong Airport and completed the preliminary site survey. In June 2017, the relocation and reconstruction project of Zhaotong Airport was approved by the State Council and the Central Military Commission.

On July 20, 2021, the relocation and reconstruction project of Zhaotong Airport officially commenced. Construction of the airport was expected to be completed by the end of 2025. The new airport is expected to be operational by the end of 2026.

== Airlines and destinations ==
Airlines	Destinations
China Eastern Airlines	Beijing–Daxing, Kunming, Shanghai–Pudong
China Southern Airlines	Guangzhou
Ruili Airlines	Lijiang
Sichuan Airlines	Hangzhou
Tibet Airlines	Chengdu–Shuangliu, Dali, Pu'er, Xi'an

== See also ==
- List of airports in China
