= Yushui, Dushan County =

Yushui 玉水镇
- Town
- Location in China
- Coordinates: 25°41′9″N 107°45′45″E
- Country: People's Republic of China
- Province: Guizhou
- Autonomous prefecture: Qiannan Buyei and Miao Autonomous Prefecture
- County: Dushan County
- Time zone: UTC+8 (China Standard)

Yushui (Chinese: 玉水; pinyin: Yùshuǐ) is a town under the administration of Dushan County, Guizhou, China. As of 2018, it has 6 villages under its administration.

== See also ==
- List of township-level divisions of Guizhou
