= Caohai Lake =

Lake in Guizhou, China

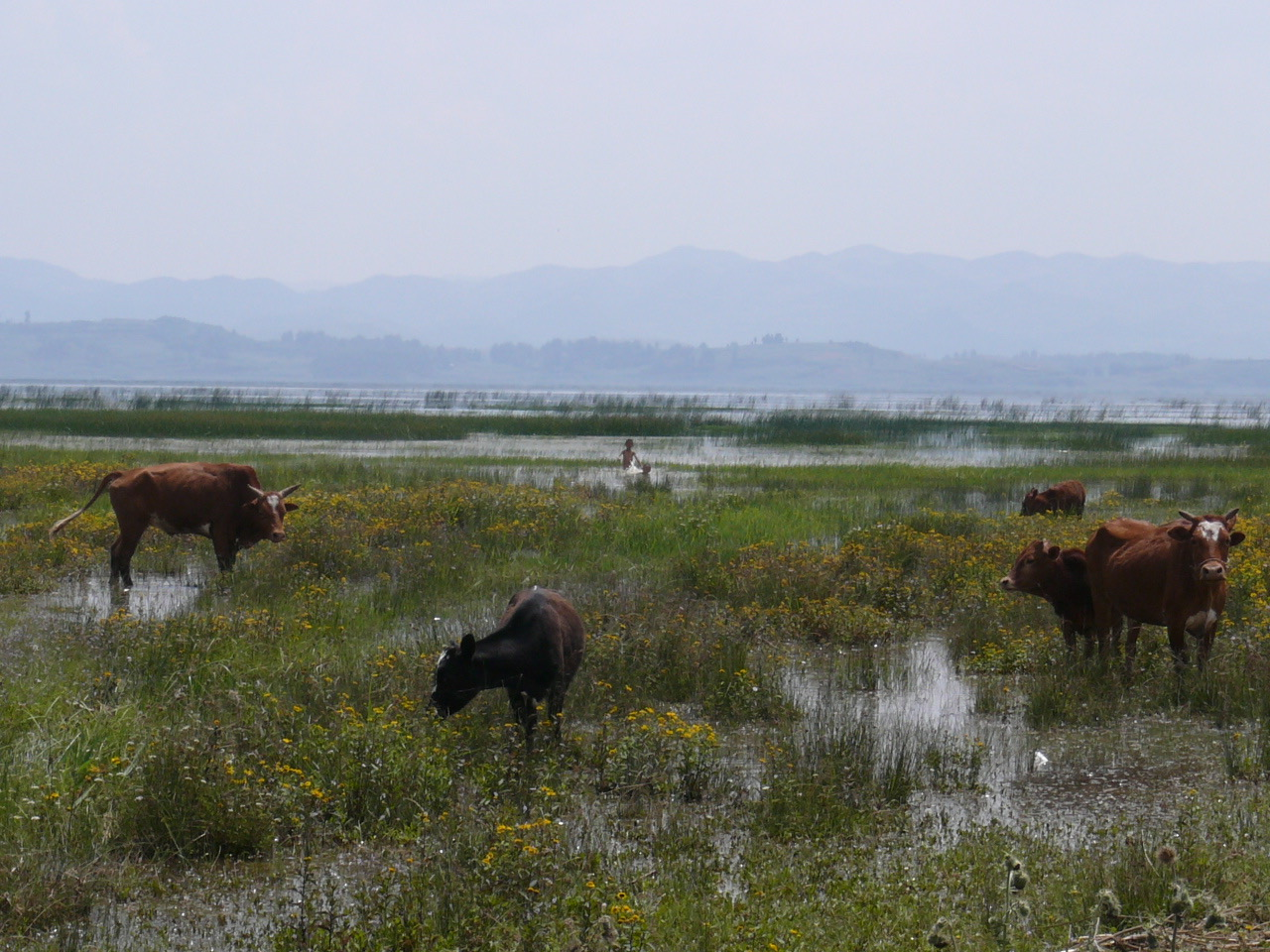

- Location within Guizhou
- Location: Guizhou Province
- Coordinates: 26°50′45″N 104°14′49″E
- Basin countries: China
- Surface area: 5 km^{2} (1.9 sq mi)
- Average depth: 2 m (6 ft 7 in)
- Surface elevation: 2,200 m (7,200 ft)

Caohai Lake (Chinese: 草海; pinyin: Cǎo Hǎi, Sea of Grass in Chinese) is a natural water-body situated in Northwest Guizhou Province of southwest China. The lake is situated on Weining Mountain, in the outskirts of Weining County. Caohai Village lies at the edge of the wetland.

== Physical data ==
The lake originally covered 4,666.2 square kilometres (1,801.6 sq mi). However, as a result of drainage, cultivation, and climate change during the last few decades, the lake area has contracted to only 5 km^{2} (1.9 sq mi). Its average depth is 2 m (6 ft 7 in) and it stands at 2,200 m (7,200 ft) above sea level.

== Caohai Nature Reserve ==
In 1985, the area around the lake was designated as a nature reserve at the provincial level, and in 1992 this was elevated to a national level designation. Cao Hai Nature Reserve is an Important Bird Area. The reserve area is 120 km^{2} (46 sq mi).

=== Fauna ===
The lake area is the largest and most important wetland of Southwest China, providing wintering grounds for black-necked cranes, the only crane species inhabiting plateaus left in the world. In addition, the lake is also inhabited by 184 bird species, including common cranes, hooded cranes, white storks, black storks, bar-headed geese, golden eagles, eastern imperial eagles, white-tailed sea-eagles, and ruddy shelducks.

One frog species, Rana weiningensis, is endemic to this area.
