= Hejing County =

Hejing County 和静县 (Chinese) خېجىڭ ناھىيىسى (Uyghur) ᠾᠧᠵᠢᠩ ᠰᠢᠶᠠᠨ (Mongolian)
- County
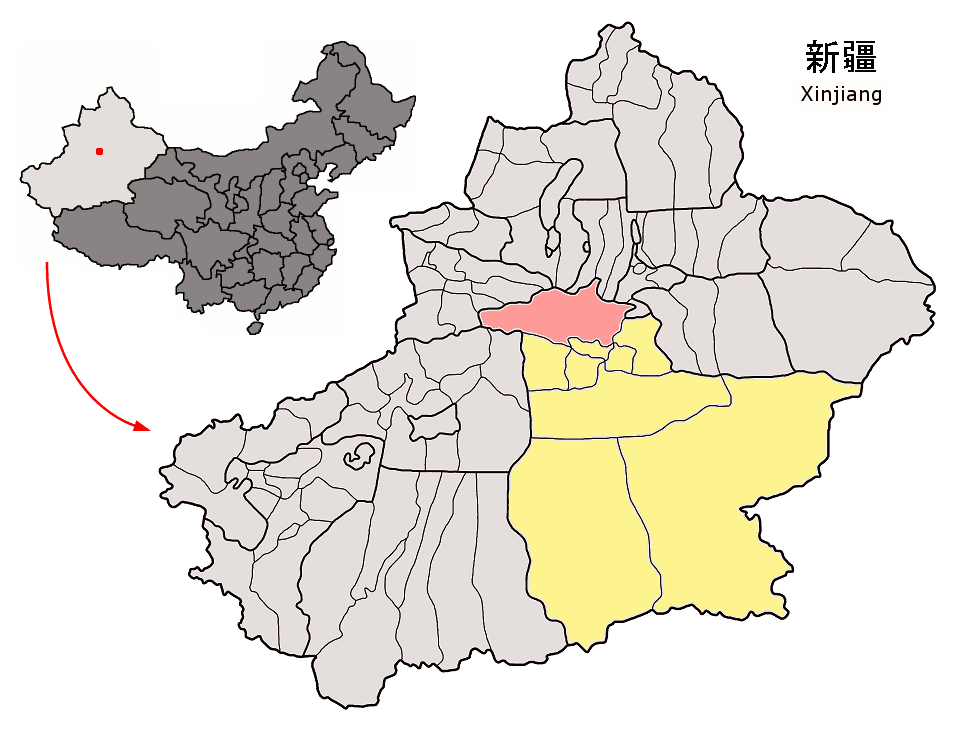
- Hejing County (red) within Bayingolin Prefecture (yellow) and Xinjiang

- Location of the seat in Xinjiang Hejing (Xinjiang) Hejing (China)
- Coordinates: 42°18′59″N 86°22′58″E
- Country: China
- Autonomous region: Xinjiang
- Autonomous prefecture: Bayingolin
- County seat: Hejing Town

Area
  - Total: 34,978.89 km^{2} (13,505.42 sq mi)

Population (2020)
  - Total: 147,859
  - Density: 4.22709/km^{2} (10.9481/sq mi)
- Time zone: UTC+8 (China Standard (Note: Locals in Xinjiang frequently observe UTC+6 (Xinjiang Time), 2 hours behind Beijing.))
- Website: www.xjhj.gov.cn

Hejing County

Chinese name
- Simplified Chinese: 和静县
- Traditional Chinese: 和靜縣
Transcriptions
Standard Mandarin
- Hanyu Pinyin: Héjìng Xiàn
Yue: Cantonese
- Jyutping: wo^{4}zing^{6} jyun^{6}

Mongolian name
- Mongolian Cyrillic: Хэжин шянь
- Mongolian script: ᠾᠧᠵᠢᠩ ᠰᠢᠶᠠᠨ

Uyghur name
- Uyghur: خېجىڭ ناھىيىسى
Transcriptions
- Latin Yëziqi: Xëjing Nahiyisi
- Yengi Yeziⱪ: Hejing Naⱨiyisi
- SASM/GNC: Hejing Nahiyisi
- Siril Yëziqi: Хеҗиң наһийиси

Hejing County is located in the central-southern part of the Tian Shan mountains of Xinjiang, in the north-west of Bayingolin Mongol Autonomous Prefecture. The northernmost county-level division of Bayingolin, it borders Ürümqi City to the north, from which it is 190 km (120 mi) away, and Korla City (the prefectural capital) to the south, which is 80 km (50 mi) away. It borders 15 cities and counties and is the most bordered county in the world.

== Demographics ==
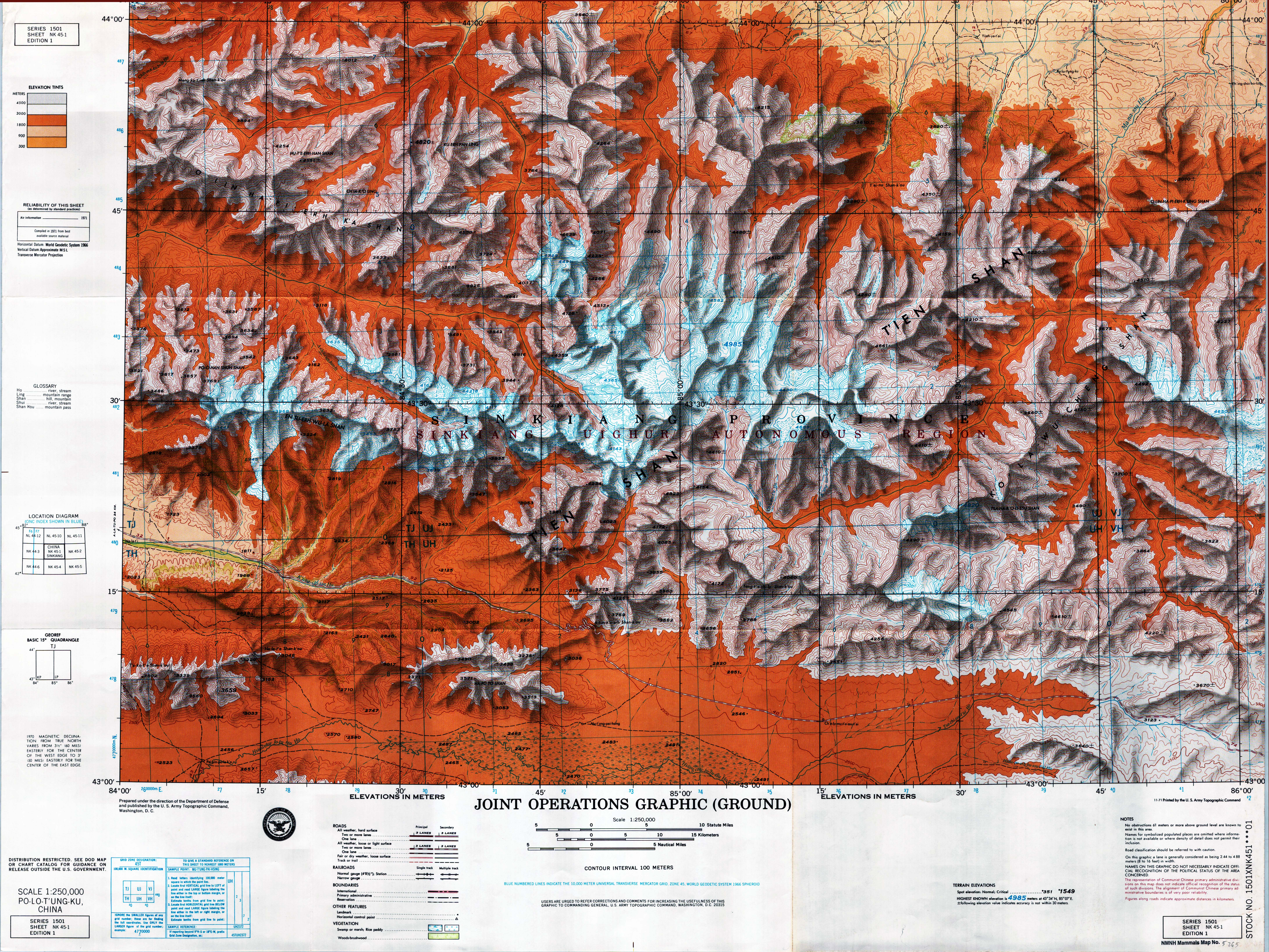
Map including northern part of the county (ATC, 1971)

The population of Hejing County is about 190,000 as of 2010, and the county is home to 29 different ethnic groups including Mongol, Han, Uyghur and Hui.

The proportion of nationalities in Hejing County, 2018
Nationality	Percentage
Han People	49.1%
Uyghurs	28.4%
Mongols	16.8%
Hui People	3.8%
Kazakhs	0.6%
Others	1.3%
Source of the population statistics :

== Climate ==
Climate data for Hejing, elevation 1,113 m (3,652 ft), (1991–2020 normals, extremes 1991–present)
Month	Jan	Feb	Mar	Apr	May	Jun	Jul	Aug	Sep	Oct	Nov	Dec	Year
Record high °C (°F)	5.0 (41.0)	14.1 (57.4)	26.4 (79.5)	33.1 (91.6)	33.9 (93.0)	36.9 (98.4)	39.0 (102.2)	39.7 (103.5)	35.7 (96.3)	28.9 (84.0)	18.6 (65.5)	8.0 (46.4)	39.7 (103.5)
Mean daily maximum °C (°F)	−4.0 (24.8)	3.3 (37.9)	12.8 (55.0)	21.3 (70.3)	26.2 (79.2)	29.7 (85.5)	31.2 (88.2)	30.3 (86.5)	25.7 (78.3)	17.9 (64.2)	7.6 (45.7)	−2.0 (28.4)	16.7 (62.0)
Daily mean °C (°F)	−10.7 (12.7)	−3.8 (25.2)	5.6 (42.1)	14.0 (57.2)	19.2 (66.6)	23.1 (73.6)	24.5 (76.1)	23.2 (73.8)	18.0 (64.4)	9.7 (49.5)	0.7 (33.3)	−7.7 (18.1)	9.7 (49.4)
Mean daily minimum °C (°F)	−15.9 (3.4)	−10.0 (14.0)	−1.4 (29.5)	6.6 (43.9)	12.0 (53.6)	16.2 (61.2)	17.7 (63.9)	16.4 (61.5)	10.8 (51.4)	3.0 (37.4)	−4.5 (23.9)	−12.0 (10.4)	3.2 (37.8)
Record low °C (°F)	−25.1 (−13.2)	−24.7 (−12.5)	−13.2 (8.2)	−5.9 (21.4)	−0.1 (31.8)	4.3 (39.7)	8.1 (46.6)	3.5 (38.3)	−0.4 (31.3)	−5.7 (21.7)	−17.7 (0.1)	−23.1 (−9.6)	−25.1 (−13.2)
Average precipitation mm (inches)	1.7 (0.07)	1.6 (0.06)	2.0 (0.08)	4.1 (0.16)	7.7 (0.30)	16.5 (0.65)	18.6 (0.73)	11.7 (0.46)	5.6 (0.22)	2.4 (0.09)	2.5 (0.10)	1.8 (0.07)	76.2 (2.99)
Average precipitation days (≥ 0.1 mm)	2.2	1.3	0.6	1.4	3.2	5.1	6.6	4.8	2.6	1.0	0.7	1.9	31.4
Average snowy days	7.6	1.9	0.5	0.3	0	0	0	0	0	0.1	0.8	7.5	18.7
Average relative humidity (%)	73	60	41	35	37	44	48	49	50	56	67	75	53
Mean monthly sunshine hours	161.5	194.0	247.7	269.1	301.3	281.9	287.0	282.7	276.4	258.5	196.8	139.8	2,896.7
Percentage possible sunshine	55	64	66	66	66	62	63	67	75	77	68	50	65
Source: China Meteorological Administrationall-time September high

Climate data for Baluntai Town, Hejing County, elevation 1,732 m (5,682 ft), (1991–2020 normals)
Month	Jan	Feb	Mar	Apr	May	Jun	Jul	Aug	Sep	Oct	Nov	Dec	Year
Mean daily maximum °C (°F)	−1.1 (30.0)	3.6 (38.5)	10.3 (50.5)	17.1 (62.8)	21.5 (70.7)	24.9 (76.8)	26.5 (79.7)	25.9 (78.6)	21.6 (70.9)	15.1 (59.2)	7.1 (44.8)	0.1 (32.2)	14.4 (57.9)
Daily mean °C (°F)	−8.7 (16.3)	−4.2 (24.4)	2.8 (37.0)	9.9 (49.8)	14.6 (58.3)	17.9 (64.2)	19.3 (66.7)	18.5 (65.3)	14.2 (57.6)	7.4 (45.3)	−0.2 (31.6)	−7.0 (19.4)	7.0 (44.7)
Mean daily minimum °C (°F)	−13.5 (7.7)	−9.9 (14.2)	−3.4 (25.9)	3.8 (38.8)	8.5 (47.3)	12.1 (53.8)	13.4 (56.1)	12.4 (54.3)	8.0 (46.4)	1.5 (34.7)	−5.0 (23.0)	−11.3 (11.7)	1.4 (34.5)
Average precipitation mm (inches)	0.8 (0.03)	0.7 (0.03)	1.9 (0.07)	10.7 (0.42)	24.4 (0.96)	58.0 (2.28)	67.6 (2.66)	50.1 (1.97)	19.5 (0.77)	4.1 (0.16)	1.1 (0.04)	0.5 (0.02)	239.4 (9.41)
Average precipitation days (≥ 0.1 mm)	0.6	1.0	1.0	3.1	6.4	10.9	12.6	10.0	5.4	1.8	0.7	0.6	54.1
Average snowy days	1.4	1.7	1.4	1.4	0.8	0.1	0	0	0.1	0.7	1.4	1.3	10.3
Average relative humidity (%)	46	40	33	35	38	46	50	50	46	43	43	48	43
Mean monthly sunshine hours	127.6	144.9	203.4	228.8	247.8	228.3	235.6	227.6	198.3	166.9	134.4	111.1	2,254.7
Percentage possible sunshine	43	48	54	56	54	50	51	54	54	50	47	40	50
Source: China Meteorological Administration

Climate data for Bayanbulak, Hejing County, elevation 2,458 m (8,064 ft), (1991–2020 normals, extremes 1981–present)
Month	Jan	Feb	Mar	Apr	May	Jun	Jul	Aug	Sep	Oct	Nov	Dec	Year
Record high °C (°F)	−1.0 (30.2)	1.1 (34.0)	14.2 (57.6)	22.2 (72.0)	24.7 (76.5)	24.8 (76.6)	27.7 (81.9)	28.3 (82.9)	24.2 (75.6)	19.2 (66.6)	11.7 (53.1)	0.6 (33.1)	28.3 (82.9)
Mean daily maximum °C (°F)	−19.5 (−3.1)	−14.2 (6.4)	−2.8 (27.0)	9.0 (48.2)	13.6 (56.5)	16.7 (62.1)	18.6 (65.5)	18.3 (64.9)	14.6 (58.3)	7.7 (45.9)	−3.4 (25.9)	−15.1 (4.8)	3.6 (38.5)
Daily mean °C (°F)	−26.4 (−15.5)	−21.7 (−7.1)	−10.2 (13.6)	1.3 (34.3)	5.9 (42.6)	9.6 (49.3)	11.3 (52.3)	10.4 (50.7)	6.2 (43.2)	−1.1 (30.0)	−11.0 (12.2)	−21.7 (−7.1)	−3.9 (24.9)
Mean daily minimum °C (°F)	−31.9 (−25.4)	−27.9 (−18.2)	−16.9 (1.6)	−5.1 (22.8)	−0.9 (30.4)	3.2 (37.8)	4.9 (40.8)	3.7 (38.7)	−1.0 (30.2)	−8.0 (17.6)	−16.7 (1.9)	−26.8 (−16.2)	−10.3 (13.5)
Record low °C (°F)	−49.6 (−57.3)	−43.0 (−45.4)	−37.4 (−35.3)	−24.0 (−11.2)	−14.6 (5.7)	−8.8 (16.2)	−6.7 (19.9)	−11.5 (11.3)	−13.1 (8.4)	−25.5 (−13.9)	−39.1 (−38.4)	−42.7 (−44.9)	−49.6 (−57.3)
Average precipitation mm (inches)	3.6 (0.14)	3.5 (0.14)	5.0 (0.20)	11.5 (0.45)	25.0 (0.98)	69.5 (2.74)	79.9 (3.15)	61.4 (2.42)	24.8 (0.98)	5.8 (0.23)	6.5 (0.26)	4.8 (0.19)	301.3 (11.88)
Average precipitation days (≥ 0.1 mm)	6.4	6.0	5.8	7.7	12.3	17.9	19.0	14.7	9.3	4.6	5.1	6.8	115.6
Average snowy days	11.1	11.7	12.0	10.2	6.2	1.2	0.2	0.5	3.3	6.6	10.8	12.5	86.3
Average relative humidity (%)	76	77	74	62	61	67	69	68	65	65	74	77	70
Mean monthly sunshine hours	186.5	195.2	239.1	243.9	254.5	229.7	244.1	255.0	246.3	241.5	180.5	165.6	2,681.9
Percentage possible sunshine	63	65	64	60	56	50	53	60	67	72	63	59	61
Source: China Meteorological Administration all-time extreme temperature

== Economy ==
Agriculture dominates the county's economy. Paprika and tomatoes are grown in abundance, the crops nourished by waters from the melting of snow in local mountains.

India-based spice company Synthite Industrial Chemicals established a processing facility in the county in 2012 with the support of the local government which cleared out of a 1,000 square foot office to provide office space and complementary electricity and communications for the company. Synthite had decided to open its first overseas production facility after becoming frustrated with the low grade variety of paprika available in India despite attempts to encourage Indian farmers to grow higher quality crops. The facility process 300,000 tons of paprika per year and employs 60 Chinese employees and three Indian employees. As of 2014 the company had expansion plans and intended to go into the cultivation of lavender and tomatoes, creating what it called a "major export hub".

== Administrative divisions ==
Hejing County includes 8 towns and 4 townships.

Name	Simplified Chinese	Hanyu Pinyin	Uyghur (UEY)	Uyghur Latin (ULY)	Mongolian (traditional)	Mongolian (Cyrillic)	Administrative division code
Towns
Hejing Town	和静镇	Héjìng Zhèn	خېجىڭ بازىرى	xëjing baziri	ᠾᠧᠵᠢᠩ ᠪᠠᠯᠭᠠᠰᠤ	Гежин балгас	652827100
Balgantai Town	巴伦台镇	Bālúntái Zhèn	بالغۇنتاي بازىرى	balghuntay baziri	ᠪᠠᠯᠭᠠᠨᠲᠠᠢ ᠪᠠᠯᠭᠠᠰᠤ	Балгаантай балгас	652827101
Barun Harmodon Town	巴润哈尔莫敦镇	Bārùnhā'ěrmòdūn Zhèn	بارۇن خارمودۇن بازىرى	barun xarmodun baziri	ᠪᠠᠷᠠᠭᠤᠨ ᠬᠠᠷᠠᠮᠣᠳᠣᠨ ᠪᠠᠯᠭᠠᠰᠤ	Баруун харамтон балгас	652827102
Harmodon Town	哈尔莫敦镇	Hā'ěrmòdūn Zhèn	خارمودۇن بازىرى	xarmodun baziri	ᠬᠠᠷᠠᠮᠣᠳᠣᠨ ᠪᠠᠯᠭᠠᠰᠤ	Харамтон балгас	652827103
Bayanbulag Town	巴音布鲁克镇	Bāyīnbùlǔkè Zhèn	بايىنبۇلاق بازىرى	bayinbulaq baziri	ᠪᠠᠶᠠᠨᠪᠤᠯᠠᠭ ᠪᠠᠯᠭᠠᠰᠤ	Баянбулаг балгас	652827104
Gonggos Town	巩乃斯镇	Gǒngnǎisī Zhèn	كۈنەس بازىرى (كۆڭگۆسىنغول بازىرى)	künes baziri (könggösinghol baziri)	ᠭᠥᠩᠭᠥᠰ ᠪᠠᠯᠭᠠᠰᠤ	Гүнгүс балгас	652827105
Naimanmodon Town	乃门莫敦镇	Nǎiménmòdūn Zhèn	نەمىنمودۇن بازىرى	neminmodun baziri	ᠨᠠᠢᠮᠠᠨᠮᠣᠳᠣᠨ ᠪᠠᠯᠭᠠᠰᠤ	Наймаамтон балгас	652827106
Xelmir Buh Town	协比乃尔布呼镇	Xiébǐnǎi'ěrbùhū Zhèn	شەلمىربۇخ بازىرى	shelmirbux baziri	ᠱᠠᠪᠢᠨᠠᠷᠪᠤᠬᠤ ᠪᠠᠯᠭᠠᠰᠤ	Шавинарваху балгас	652827107
Townships
Kirghut Township	克尔古提乡	Kè'ěrgǔtí Xiāng	كىرغۇت يېزىسى	kirghut yëzisi	ᠬᠡᠷᠡᠭᠦᠲᠦ ᠰᠤᠮᠤᠨ	Хэрүүт суман	652827203
Algu Township	阿拉沟乡	Ālāgōu Xiāng	ئالغۇ يېزىسى	Alghu yëzisi	ᠠᠯᠭᠤᠤ ᠰᠤᠮᠤᠨ	Алгуу суман	652827204
Elzet Ul Township	额勒再特乌鲁乡	Élèzàitèwūlǔ Xiāng	گۈلجېت ئۇل يېزىسى	güljët Ul yëzisi	ᠥᠯᠵᠡᠢᠲᠦᠠ᠋ᠭᠤᠯᠠ ᠰᠤᠮᠤᠨ	Өлзийтногоол суман	652827205
Bayingolin Township (Bayan Gol Township)	巴音郭楞乡	Bāyīnguōléng Xiāng	بايانغول يېزىسى	bayanghol yëzisi	ᠪᠠᠶᠠᠨᠭᠣᠣᠯ ᠰᠤᠮᠤᠨ	Баянгол суман	652827206

Other:

- XPCC 21st Regiment Farm (兵团二十一团)

== Transport ==
Hejing is served by the Southern Xinjiang Railway and Hejing Bayinbuluke Airport.
