= Weining Yi, Hui, and Miao Autonomous County =

Weining County 威宁县 · وِنٍْ شِیًا · 𖽂𖽹𖾑 𖼐𖽡𖽾 𖼳𖽗𖾏
- Autonomous county
- 威宁彝族回族苗族自治县 وِنٍْ یِذُو خُوِذُو مِیَوْذُو ذِجِشِیًا 𖽂𖽹𖾑 𖼐𖽡𖽾 𖽃𖽔𖾑 𖼄𖽘𖾐 𖽃𖽔𖾑 𖼈𖽻 𖼚𖽪𖾐 𖽃𖽔𖾑 𖼄𖽑𖽻𖾐 𖼷𖽵𖾏 𖼮𖽵𖾏 𖼳𖽗𖾏 Weining Yi, Hui and Miao Autonomous County
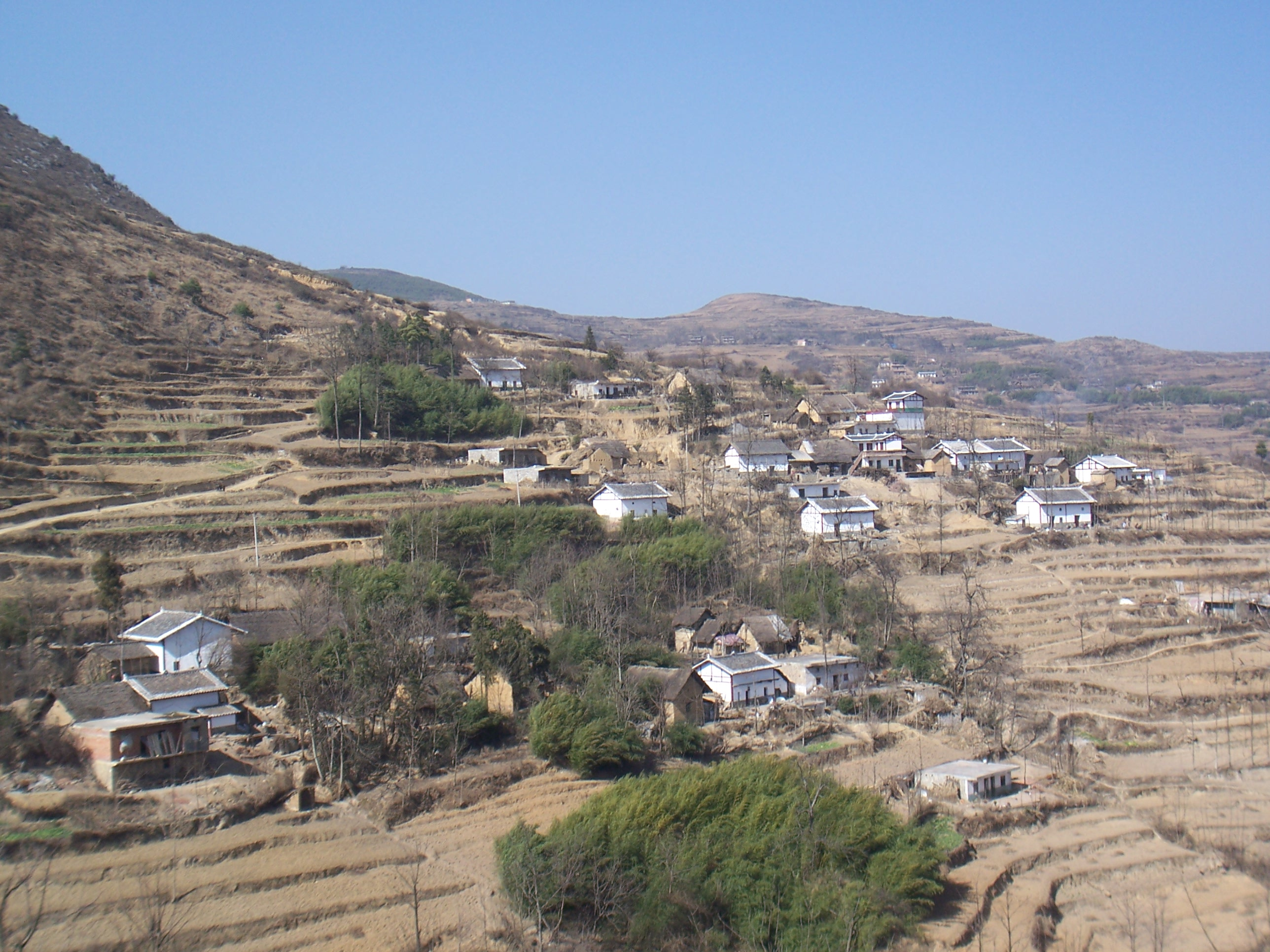

- Location of the seat in Guizhou Weining (Southwest China)
- Coordinates (Weining County government): 26°52′26″N 104°15′10″E
- Country: China
- Province: Guizhou
- Prefecture-level city: Bijie
- County seat: Haibian Subdistrict

Area
  - Total: 9,296 km^{2} (3,589 sq mi)

Population (2020 census)
  - Total: 1,280,116
  - Density: 137.7/km^{2} (356.7/sq mi)
- Time zone: UTC+8 (China Standard)
- Postal code: 553100
- Website: gzweining.gov.cn

Weining Yi, Hui and Miao Autonomous County (simplified Chinese: 威宁彝族回族苗族自治县; traditional Chinese: 威寧彝族回族苗族自治縣; pinyin: Wēiníng Yízú Huízú Miáozú Zìzhìxiàn; Nasu: , Wusa Nasu pronunciation: [ʂo˩˧ hɪ˨˩ mi˩˧]; Xiao'erjing: وِنٍْ یِذُو خُوِذُو مِیَوْذُو ذِجِشِیًا; Miao: 𖽂𖽹𖾑 𖼐𖽡𖽾 𖽃𖽔𖾑 𖼄𖽘𖾐 𖽃𖽔𖾑 𖼈𖽻 𖼚𖽪𖾐 𖽃𖽔𖾑 𖼄𖽑𖽻𖾐 𖼷𖽵𖾏 𖼮𖽵𖾏 𖼳𖽗𖾏, Latin: Weid Nings Ad Mangb Ad Vaos Dlub Ad Hmaob Zix Zhix Xanx) is a county of Guizhou, China. It is under the administration of the prefecture-level city of Bijie.

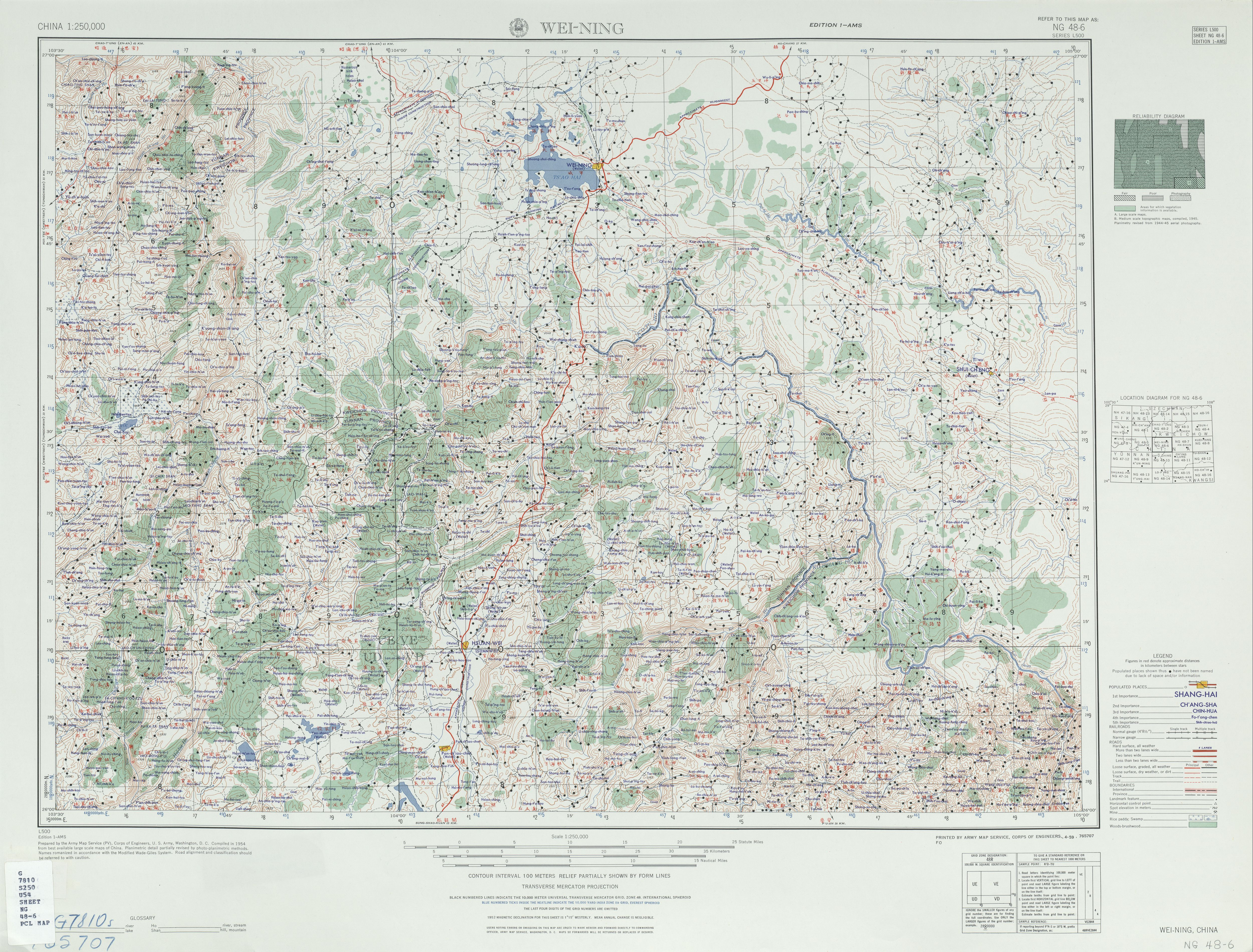
Map including Weining (labelled as WEI-NING 威寧) (AMS, 1954)

Notable attractions include Majie Ethnic Yi Village (马街彝族村寨), the historic site of Shimenkan church (石门坎教堂) and Caohai Lake nature reserve. In the early 20th century, the village of Shimenkan was known as the Overseas Heaven and a sacred civilized area due to the contributions by Rev. Sam Pollard, a British Methodist missionary.

== Administrative divisions ==
Weining is divided into 4 subdistricts, 30 towns, 4 townships and 1 ethnic township:

Subdistricts

- Haibian Subdistrict (海边街道)
- Wuligang Subdistrict (五里岗街道)
- Liuqiao Subdistrict (六桥街道)
- Shanqiao Subdistrict (陕桥街道)

Towns

- Caohai Town (草海镇)
- Yaozhan Town (幺站镇)
- Jinzhong Town (金钟镇)
- Lushan Town (炉山镇)
- Longchang Town (龙场镇)
- Heishitou Town (黑石头镇)
- Zhejue Town (哲觉镇)
- Guanfenghai Town (观风海镇)
- Niupeng Town (牛棚镇)
- Yina Town (迤那镇)
- Zhongshui Town (中水镇)
- Longjie Town (龙街镇)
- Xueshan Town (雪山镇)
- Yangjie Town (羊街镇)
- Xiaohai Town (小海镇)
- Yancang Town (盐仓镇)
- Dongfeng Town (东风镇)
- Ertang Town (二塘镇)
- Houchang Town (猴场镇)
- Xiushui Town (秀水镇)
- Shuanglong Town (双龙镇)
- Mazha Town (麻乍镇)
- Yulong Town (玉龙镇)
- Tujie Town (兔街镇)
- Haila Town (海拉镇)
- Chahe Town (岔河镇)
- Heituhe Town (黑土河镇)
- Jindou Town (金斗镇)
- Halahe Town (哈喇河镇)
- Dougu Town (斗古镇)

Townships

- Shimen Township (石门乡)
- Yungui Township (云贵乡)
- Bandi Township (板底乡)
- Dajie Township (大街乡)

Ethnic township

- Xinfa Buyei Ethnic Township (新发布依族乡)

== Climate ==
Weining has a subtropical highland climate (Köppen Cwb). The monthly 24-hour mean temperature ranges from 2.6 °C (36.7 °F) in January to 18.0 °C (64.4 °F) in July, and the annual mean is 11.1 °C (52.0 °F). Over two-thirds of the annual rainfall occurs from June to September.

Climate data for Weining, elevation 2,239 m (7,346 ft), (1991–2020 normals, extremes 1971–2010)
Month	Jan	Feb	Mar	Apr	May	Jun	Jul	Aug	Sep	Oct	Nov	Dec	Year
Record high °C (°F)	22.8 (73.0)	24.3 (75.7)	28.2 (82.8)	28.7 (83.7)	30.7 (87.3)	31.5 (88.7)	28.5 (83.3)	28.6 (83.5)	30.0 (86.0)	25.1 (77.2)	23.2 (73.8)	21.6 (70.9)	31.5 (88.7)
Mean daily maximum °C (°F)	9.0 (48.2)	11.6 (52.9)	16.0 (60.8)	19.2 (66.6)	20.7 (69.3)	21.3 (70.3)	22.5 (72.5)	22.3 (72.1)	19.7 (67.5)	15.6 (60.1)	13.5 (56.3)	9.5 (49.1)	16.7 (62.1)
Daily mean °C (°F)	2.6 (36.7)	5.0 (41.0)	8.6 (47.5)	12.3 (54.1)	14.8 (58.6)	16.7 (62.1)	18.0 (64.4)	17.6 (63.7)	15.1 (59.2)	11.3 (52.3)	7.9 (46.2)	3.6 (38.5)	11.1 (52.0)
Mean daily minimum °C (°F)	−1.1 (30.0)	0.8 (33.4)	4.0 (39.2)	7.9 (46.2)	10.9 (51.6)	13.7 (56.7)	15.2 (59.4)	14.7 (58.5)	12.4 (54.3)	8.7 (47.7)	4.6 (40.3)	0.2 (32.4)	7.7 (45.8)
Record low °C (°F)	−11.4 (11.5)	−15.3 (4.5)	−10.0 (14.0)	−5.4 (22.3)	0.1 (32.2)	5.5 (41.9)	6.9 (44.4)	7.8 (46.0)	3.1 (37.6)	−3.0 (26.6)	−6.3 (20.7)	−12.2 (10.0)	−15.3 (4.5)
Average precipitation mm (inches)	11.9 (0.47)	9.5 (0.37)	20.6 (0.81)	38.8 (1.53)	86.4 (3.40)	183.0 (7.20)	163.2 (6.43)	155.3 (6.11)	109.6 (4.31)	65.8 (2.59)	18.0 (0.71)	7.5 (0.30)	869.6 (34.23)
Average precipitation days (≥ 0.1 mm)	12.4	10.4	11.1	12.5	15.6	19.9	18.8	17.3	15.5	17.3	9.6	10.9	171.3
Average snowy days	7.0	5.1	2.8	0.5	0	0	0	0	0	0.1	1.4	4.6	21.5
Average relative humidity (%)	78	72	70	70	74	82	81	81	82	86	80	81	78
Mean monthly sunshine hours	134.7	143.9	177.0	177.4	152.0	100.6	121.6	131.6	106.4	88.2	132.5	123.4	1,589.3
Percentage possible sunshine	41	45	47	46	36	24	29	33	29	25	41	38	36
Source 1: China Meteorological Administration
Source 2: Weather China

== Transportation ==
Weining is served by the G7611 Duyun–Shangri-La Expressway, the Weining–Xuanwei Expressway, the Bijie–Weining Expressway, China National Highway 326 and by the Neijiang-Liupanshui Railway. Weining Caohai Airport is under construction.
