= Dejiang County =

Dejiang County 德江县
- County
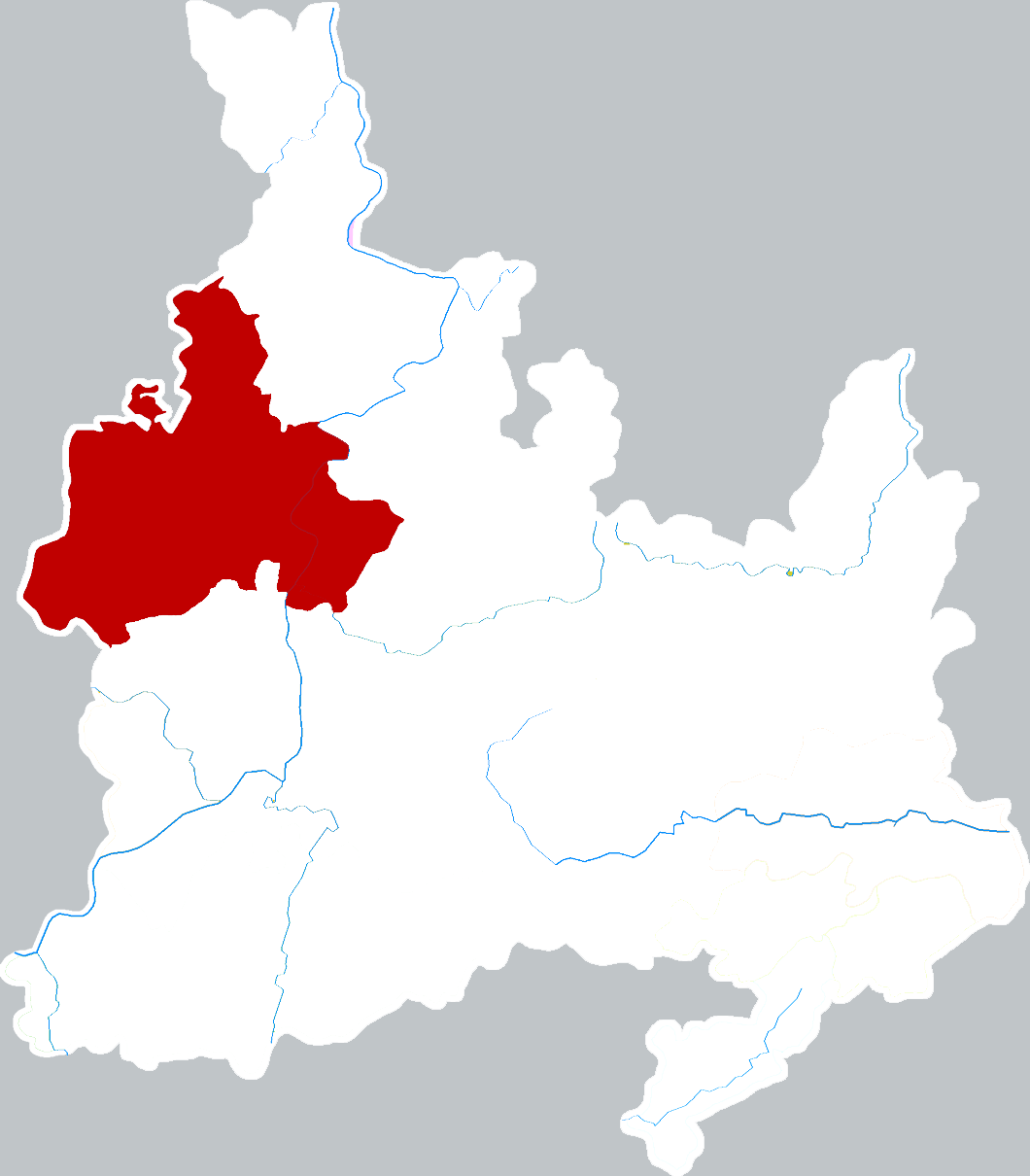

- Location of the seat in Guizhou Dejiang (Southwest China)
- Coordinates (Dejiang County government): 28°15′50″N 108°07′11″E
- Country: China
- Province: Guizhou
- Prefecture-level city: Tongren
- County seat: Qinglong

Area
  - Total: 2,071.9 km^{2} (800.0 sq mi)

Population (2010)
  - Total: 367,908
  - Density: 177.57/km^{2} (459.91/sq mi)
- Time zone: UTC+8 (China Standard)
- Postal code: 565200

Dejiang County (Chinese: 德江县; pinyin: Déjiāng Xiàn) is a county under the administration of the prefecture-level city of Tongren, in the northeast of Guizhou Province, China. The government is located in Qinglong.

== Administrative divisions ==
Dejiang County is divided into 3 subdistricts, 11 towns and 8 ethnic townships:

subdistricts

- Qinglong Subdistrict 青龙街道
- Yushui Subdistrict 玉水街道
- Anhua Subdistrict 安化街道

towns

- Jiancha Town 煎茶镇
- Chaodi Town 潮砥镇
- Fengxiangxi Town 枫香溪镇
- Wenping Town 稳坪镇
- Fuxing Town 复兴镇
- Hexing Town 合兴镇
- Gaoshan Town 高山镇
- Quankou Town 泉口镇
- Changbao Town 长堡镇
- Gonghe Town 共和镇
- Pingyuan Town 平原镇

ethnic townships

- Jingjiao Tujia Ethnic Township 荆角土家族乡
- Yantang Tujia Ethnic Township 堰塘土家族乡
- Longquan Tujia Ethnic Township 龙泉土家族乡
- Qianjia Tujia Ethnic Township 钱家土家族乡
- Shaxi Tujia Ethnic Township 沙溪土家族乡
- Nangan Tujia Ethnic Township 楠杆土家族乡
- Changfeng Tujia Ethnic Township 长丰土家族乡
- Tongjing Tujia Ethnic Township 桶井土家族乡

== Climate ==
Climate data for Dejiang, elevation 523 m (1,716 ft), (1991–2020 normals, extremes 1981–present)
| Month | Jan | Feb | Mar | Apr | May | Jun | Jul | Aug | Sep | Oct | Nov | Dec | Year |
|---|---|---|---|---|---|---|---|---|---|---|---|---|---|
| Record high °C (°F) | 21.7 (71.1) | 30.3 (86.5) | 34.1 (93.4) | 33.3 (91.9) | 36.5 (97.7) | 36.1 (97.0) | 38.9 (102.0) | 38.7 (101.7) | 38.4 (101.1) | 33.9 (93.0) | 29.2 (84.6) | 22.2 (72.0) | 38.9 (102.0) |
| Mean daily maximum °C (°F) | 8.4 (47.1) | 11.3 (52.3) | 15.8 (60.4) | 21.6 (70.9) | 25.7 (78.3) | 28.4 (83.1) | 31.5 (88.7) | 31.8 (89.2) | 27.9 (82.2) | 21.4 (70.5) | 16.8 (62.2) | 10.9 (51.6) | 21.0 (69.7) |
| Daily mean °C (°F) | 5.3 (41.5) | 7.7 (45.9) | 11.4 (52.5) | 16.8 (62.2) | 20.9 (69.6) | 24.0 (75.2) | 26.5 (79.7) | 26.3 (79.3) | 22.7 (72.9) | 17.3 (63.1) | 12.6 (54.7) | 7.5 (45.5) | 16.6 (61.8) |
| Mean daily minimum °C (°F) | 3.1 (37.6) | 5.3 (41.5) | 8.5 (47.3) | 13.4 (56.1) | 17.4 (63.3) | 20.8 (69.4) | 22.9 (73.2) | 22.4 (72.3) | 19.1 (66.4) | 14.6 (58.3) | 9.9 (49.8) | 5.1 (41.2) | 13.5 (56.4) |
| Record low °C (°F) | −3.4 (25.9) | −3.3 (26.1) | −1.9 (28.6) | 4.6 (40.3) | 7.9 (46.2) | 13.3 (55.9) | 15.4 (59.7) | 16.0 (60.8) | 11.6 (52.9) | 5.3 (41.5) | −0.4 (31.3) | −3.1 (26.4) | −3.4 (25.9) |
| Average precipitation mm (inches) | 24.7 (0.97) | 25.4 (1.00) | 52.4 (2.06) | 107.5 (4.23) | 197.6 (7.78) | 231.0 (9.09) | 190.1 (7.48) | 121.9 (4.80) | 80.4 (3.17) | 117.6 (4.63) | 50.1 (1.97) | 20.4 (0.80) | 1,219.1 (47.98) |
| Average precipitation days (≥ 0.1 mm) | 12.0 | 11.7 | 14.5 | 16.3 | 18.0 | 17.0 | 13.2 | 12.1 | 10.0 | 15.8 | 11.5 | 10.4 | 162.5 |
| Average snowy days | 4.1 | 1.9 | 0.5 | 0 | 0 | 0 | 0 | 0 | 0 | 0 | 0 | 1.5 | 8 |
| Average relative humidity (%) | 80 | 79 | 79 | 81 | 82 | 84 | 81 | 79 | 79 | 84 | 83 | 80 | 81 |
| Mean monthly sunshine hours | 30.4 | 33.9 | 60.5 | 79.8 | 96.3 | 92.3 | 151.2 | 170.9 | 122.1 | 69.9 | 64.4 | 40.6 | 1,012.3 |
| Percentage possible sunshine | 9 | 11 | 16 | 21 | 23 | 22 | 36 | 42 | 33 | 20 | 20 | 13 | 22 |
Source: China Meteorological Administration
