= Nanchang Laoyingfang Airport =

Nanchang Laoyingfang Airport 南昌老营房机场
- IATA: none; ICAO: none

Summary
- Airport type: Closed (former military)
- Location: Nanchang, Jiangxi, China
- Opened: November 1929
- Closed: After 1949
- Coordinates: 28°40′33″N 115°54′36″E

Map
- Location of the airport in China

Nanchang Laoyingfang Airport (Chinese: 南昌老营房机场) was a military air base and the first airport in Nanchang, the capital of Jiangxi Province, China. Constructed in 1929, it was one of the four major air bases of the Republic of China Air Force in the 1930s. Laoyingfang was closed after 1949 and its site has been redeveloped for use by the Jiangxi Provincial Government and Jiangxi Normal University.

== History ==
Laoyingfang Airport was opened in November 1929, the first airport in Nanchang, the capital of China's Jiangxi Province. It was very small at first, and was expanded a year later.

During Chiang Kai-shek's Encirclement Campaigns against the Chinese Soviet Republic, the rebel communist base in southern Jiangxi, the airport was greatly expanded in 1933 and served as the base for more than 200 Kuomintang war planes. It became one of the four major air bases of the Republic of China Air Force, together with Hangzhou Jianqiao, Nanjing Dajiaochang, and Luoyang Beijiao.

As Laoyingfang's proximity to the city centre impeded frequent military operations, Chiang Kai-shek ordered the construction of the even larger Sanjiadian Airport (later known as Qingyunpu Airport) in Qingyunpu, then in the far outskirts of Nanchang. The new air base was opened in the spring of 1935.

In 1933, Chiang Kai-shek signed an agreement with Italian Prime Minister Benito Mussolini to establish a joint venture in China to manufacture airplanes. The company, called Sino-Italian National Aircraft Works (SINAW), was established in 1934 in Nanchang, with factories located at both Laoyingfang and Sanjiadian airports. It became the predecessor of Hongdu Aviation, one of China's major aircraft manufacturers.

After the outbreak of the Second Sino-Japanese War in 1937, SINAW factories were severely damaged by Japanese aerial bombing. Nanchang was later occupied by the Imperial Japanese Army, which used Laoyingfang as an air base. It was likely from Laoyingfang that the Unit 731 launched germ warfare against the city of Changde in nearby Hunan province.

In September 1945, after the surrender of Japan at the end of World War II, China Airlines started to operate scheduled Shanghai–Fuzhou–Nanchang–Hankou flights from Laoyingfang Airport. It became a dedicated civil airport in May 1948.

After the Communist Party won the Chinese Civil War and established the People's Republic of China in 1949, Laoyingfang Airport fell into disuse and Xiangtang Airport was built as Nanchang's main airport for both military and civil flights. The site for Laoyingfang was redeveloped, part of which is occupied by the Jiangxi Provincial Government, and its former runway is now a street on the campus of Jiangxi Normal University.
