= China Eastern Airlines Flight 5510 =

1989 aviation accident in China

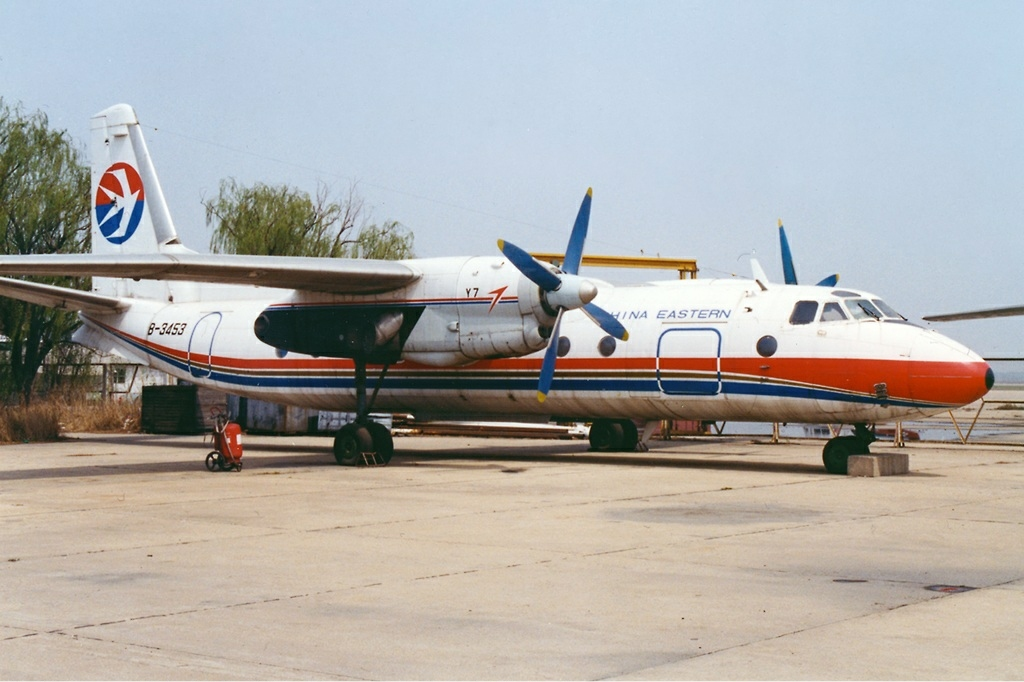
- A China Eastern Airlines Xian Y-7, similar to the Antonov An-24 involved

Accident
- Date: 15 August 1989
- Summary: Runway excursion following an engine failure on takeoff; crashed into a river
- Site: Near Shanghai Hongqiao Airport, Shanghai, China

Aircraft
- Aircraft type: Antonov An-24RV
- Operator: China Eastern Airlines
- Registration: B-3417
- Flight origin: Shanghai Hongqiao International Airport
- Destination: Nanchang Xiangtang Airport
- Occupants: 40
- Passengers: 32
- Crew: 8
- Fatalities: 34
- Injuries: 6
- Survivors: 6

On 15 August 1989, China Eastern Airlines Flight 5510, an Antonov An-24 operating a domestic passenger flight from Shanghai Hongqiao Airport, Shanghai, to Nanchang Xiangtang Airport, Nanchang, China, crashed into the Zhoujiabang River after overruning the runway following an engine failure on takeoff. Of 32 passengers and 8 crew members, 28 passengers and 6 crew members were killed.

On takeoff, the right engine lost power and the aircraft tilted to the right. Despite the crew's attempt to recover the aircraft, the aircraft touched down and subsequently exited the runway, striking a ditch, before plunging into the river. Eight people initially survived, but two succumbed to their injuries whilst being transported to the hospital. The rescue operation was criticized for its shortcomings regarding the treatment of the injured, their transportation to the hospital and its lack of coordination with hospital staff.

== Aircraft and crew ==
The aircraft involved, manufactured in 1973, was an Antonov An-24RV registered as B-3417. A twin-turboprop aircraft, it was powered by two Ivchenko AI-24VT engines. The aircraft was operated by China Eastern Airlines, a regional subsidiary of flag carrier CAAC Airlines. The An-24 was introduced into CAAC Airlines' fleet in 1970. On board the flight were 32 passengers and 8 crew members. The pilots were in good health and were qualified to fly. The passengers included two Japanese Mitsubishi workers.

Although production of the An-24 ceased in the Soviet Union in 1978, China continued producing its variant of the aircraft, the Xi'an Y-7. At the time of the accident, CAAC Airlines, which was undergoing a reorganization and decentralization, was in the process of retiring its fleet of Soviet aircraft, most of which were more than two decades old.

== Accident ==
On 15 August 1989, the aircraft, operating as China Eastern Airlines Flight 5510, was on a scheduled domestic passenger flight from Shanghai Hongqiao International Airport, Shanghai, to Nanchang Xiangtang Airport, Xiangtang, Jiangxi. At the time of the accident, weather conditions were satisfactory and no rain was present. At 15:46 local time, the aircraft took off heading north. However, the aircraft's right engine suddenly lost power, leading to the aircraft tilting to the right. The crew attempted to continue taking off and mostly succeeded in correcting the aircraft's yaw. Despite their efforts, the aircraft only reached a maximum altitude of 5 metres (16 ft) before touching down on its right-hand landing gear 200 m (660 ft) away from the runway threshold.

Traveling at high speed, the aircraft overran the runway, struck a protective ditch and plunged into the Zhoujiabang River 50 m (160 ft) away from the airport at 15:48. The aircraft's wings and forward fuselage were completely submerged, while the rear third remained above water. Of the 40 occupants, 34 were killed, including 6 crew members and 28 passengers, consisting of 2 Japanese passengers and 26 Chinese passengers; all 6 survivors were injured.

Police officers from the Hongqiao Airport Public Security Bureau were among the first responders. They received notification of the crash and within three minutes, sent over 60 officers to the scene. They were able to rescue the six survivors from the tail of the aircraft. The subsequent rescue operation, coordinated by the police department, prevented fuel from the aircraft spreading further into the river and recovered the bodies of the victims, the wreckage of the aircraft, and luggage and cargo. At 11 pm, Li Zhao, the Deputy Director of the Civil Aviation Administration of China (CAAC), arrived at the crash site to help coordinate the operation. After 12 hours, the rescue operation ended and the airport resumed normal operations.

== Casualties and rescue response ==
At 16:50, eight injured people were brought to the Civil Aviation Shanghai Hospital (民航上海医院), but upon arrival, two of them had already succumbed to their injuries. Injuries sustained by the six survivors included fractures, contusions and lacerations, and joint dislocations. All six survivors recovered: the first was discharged on 30 October 1989 and the last on 27 February 1990.

The six survivors were seated at seats 7C, 8C, 9D, 10C, 12B, and 12C; most were seated on the right side of the cabin. No survivors were seated in row 6 or any row forward of it. The initial touchdown on the right main landing gear caused some passengers to collide with seats, although none lost consciousness. Many subsequently lost consciousness after being thrown against equipment and objects during the aircraft's strong deceleration while crossing the ditch.

In his 1994 analysis of the casualties in the Chinese Journal of Aviation Medicine, Chen Changyao of the Civil Aviation Shanghai Hospital theorized that after the aircraft touched down, passengers seated on the left were more likely to have been thrown from their seats after touchdown, while the subsequent impact with the ditch probably worsened their injuries. He also theorized that passengers in the front may likewise have been more severely injured and lost consciousness when the aircraft struck structures. He concluded that most injured passengers probably drowned after the aircraft entered the river, and that the 34 deaths were likely caused by drowning following loss of consciousness.

In addition, he was critical of the on-site rescue operation. None of the eight people brought to the hospital received "injury certificates, basic bandages, immobilization and hemostasis", nor were they accompanied by medical personnel. As a result, the hospital's staff were unaware that the injured had been in contact with contaminated water from the river or had experienced drowning; he cited the case of a passenger who may have survived had he received timely and sustained emergency treatment during transportation. Furthermore, although it should have taken 15 minutes to drive from the airport to the hospital, the injured only arrived an hour after the accident. Finally, as the hospital was located nearest to the crash site, it should have been notified of the matter so as to send in their staff and also prepare for the arrival of the injured. The hospital only learned of the accident shortly before the arrival of the injured, at the same time staff were ending their shifts.

== Aftermath ==
The CAAC investigated the crash. The "Xiaguang Suicide Group", a Chinese organization, claimed that they were responsible for the crash. (Note: The group claimed in a letter that it had taken action "because Japanese businessmen are invading China with the complicity of the Chinese government". The group had previously issued threats, including one against Japan Air Lines in July for the same stated reason, threatening to kill two Japanese nationals.) On 17 August, the CAAC stated that there was no evidence to support that sabotage caused the crash. On 3 September, the Ministry of Foreign Affairs denied that sabotage was the cause of the crash, reiterating that the investigation had not found any evidence supporting the theory and had instead pointed to mechanical problems.

== See also ==
- TWA Flight 800 (1964)
- Air Algerie Flight 6289
