= Shanghai Hongqiao International Airport =

Secondary airport serving Shanghai, China

Shanghai Hongqiao International Airport 上海虹桥国际机场

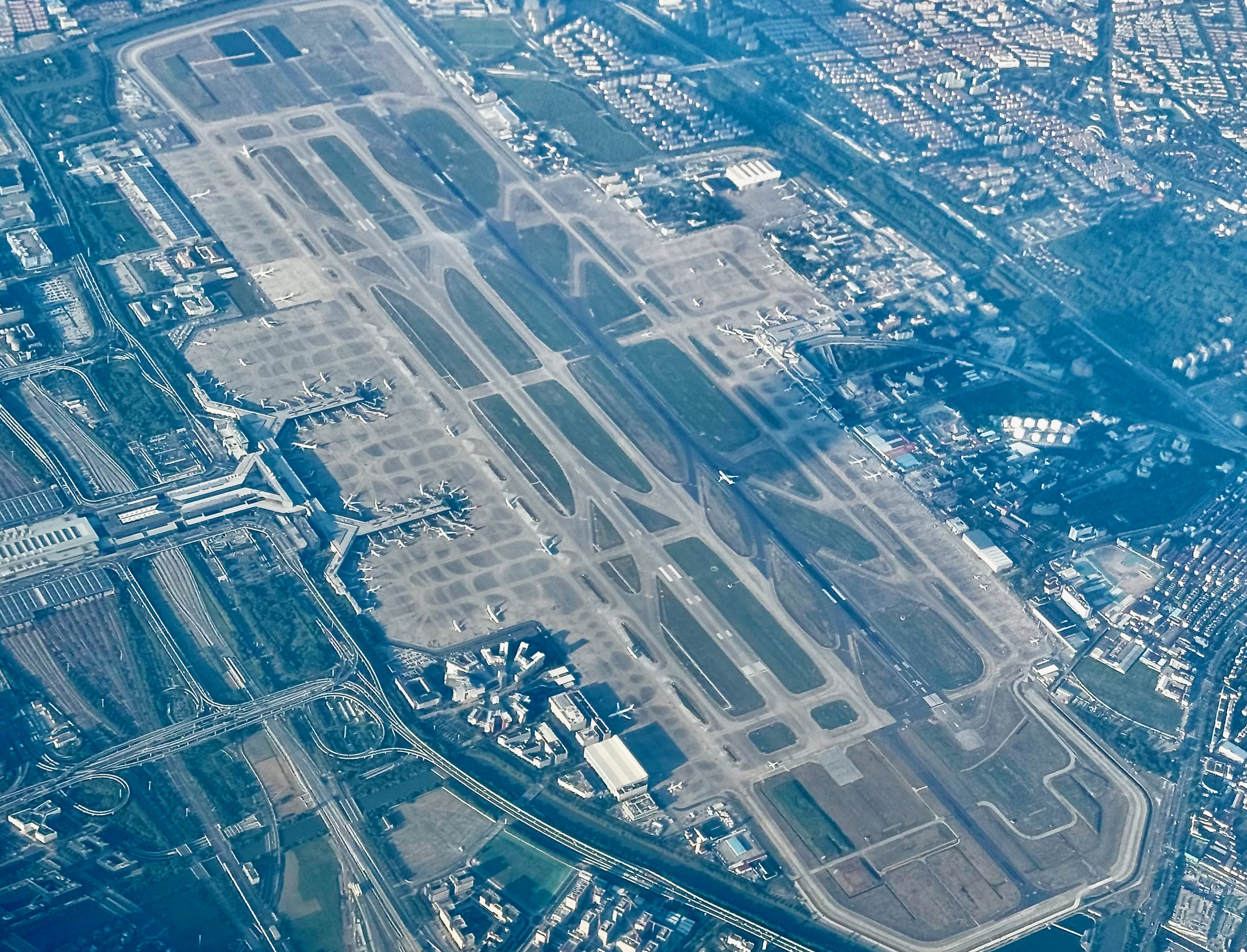
- Aerial view of Hongqiao Airport in 2024
- IATA: SHA; ICAO: ZSSS

Summary
- Airport type: Public
- Owner/Operator: Shanghai Airport Authority
- Serves: Shanghai
- Location: Changning and Minhang districts, Shanghai, China
- Opened: 8 July 1929; 97 years ago
- Hub for: China Eastern Airlines; Juneyao Air; Shanghai Airlines
- Operating base for: Spring Airlines
- Elevation AMSL: 3 m (9.8 ft)
- Coordinates: 31°11′53″N 121°20′11″E
- Website: Official website

Maps
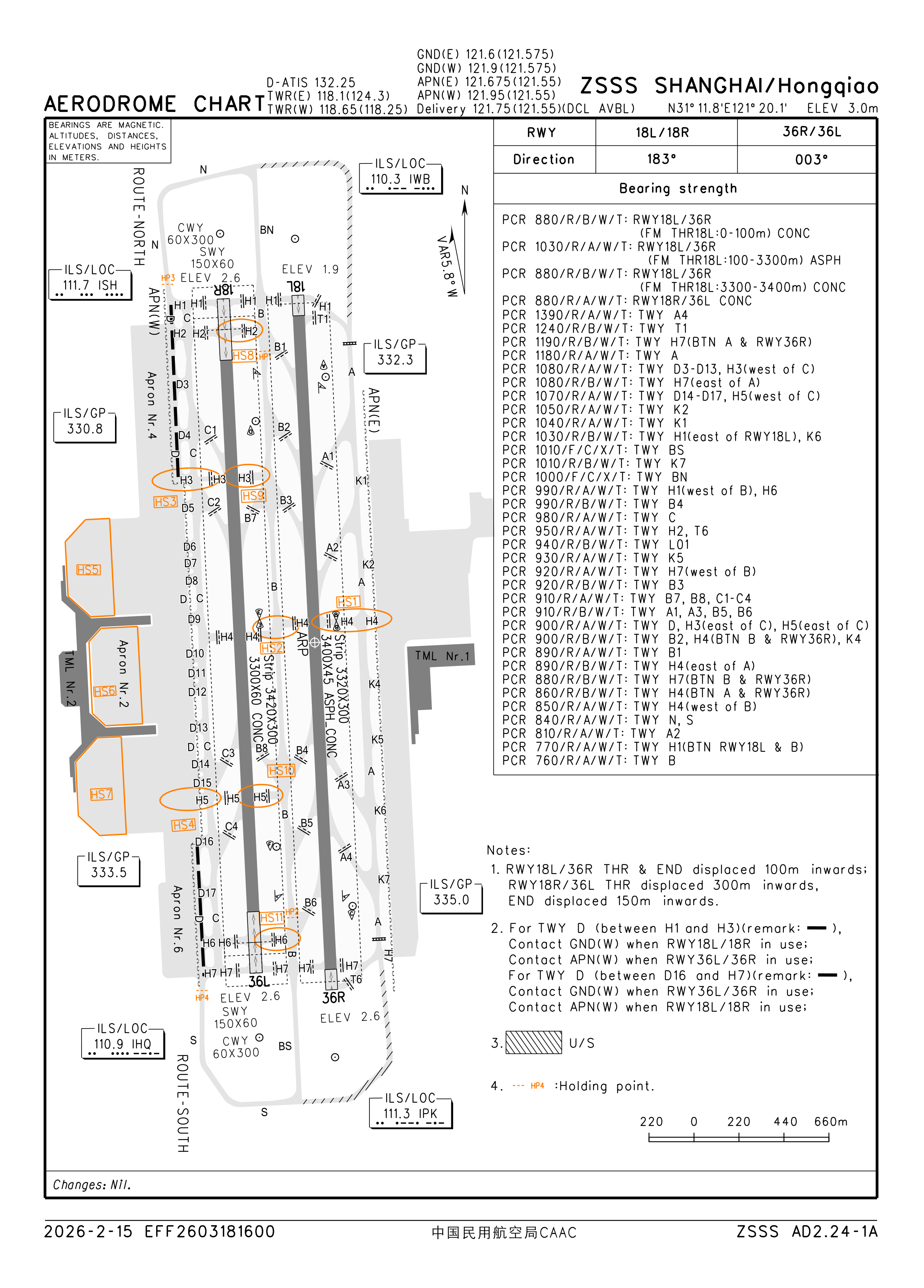
- CAAC airport chart

- Location in Shanghai Location in China

Runways
Direction	Length		Surface
Direction	m	ft	Surface
18L/36R	3,400	11,155	Asphalt
18R/36L	3,300	10,827	Concrete

Statistics (2025)
- Passengers: 50,151,025 ▲4.6%
- Aircraft movements: 282,692 ▲2.7%
- Cargo (Tonnes): 445,265.5 ▲4.1%

Shanghai Hongqiao International Airport
- Simplified Chinese: 上海虹桥国际机场
- Traditional Chinese: 上海虹橋國際機場
Transcriptions
Standard Mandarin
- Hanyu Pinyin: Shànghǎi Hóngqiáo Guójì Jīchǎng

Shanghai Hongqiao International Airport (IATA: SHA, ICAO: ZSSS) is one of two international airports serving Shanghai, China.

The airport is located near the town of Hongqiao in the outskirts of Changning and Minhang districts, 13 kilometres (8.1 mi) west of downtown, and is closer to the city center than Shanghai–Pudong.

Hongqiao Airport is the corporate headquarters and a major hub for China Eastern Airlines, Shanghai Airlines, and Juneyao Air, as well as a major operating base for Spring Airlines. In 2025, Hongqiao Airport handled 50,151,025 passengers, making it the 8th busiest airport in China and the 42nd busiest in the world. As of 2026, Hongqiao Airport hosted 25 airlines serving 63 scheduled passenger destinations. Shanghai Hongqiao Airport was also certified with the Skytrax 5-Star Airport Rating for facilities, terminal comfort and cleanliness, shopping, food & beverages, and staff service in 2025.

Hongqiao Airport served as Shanghai's primary airport until the completion of Pudong International Airport on 1 October 1999, when most international flights were gradually moved to Pudong.

== History ==
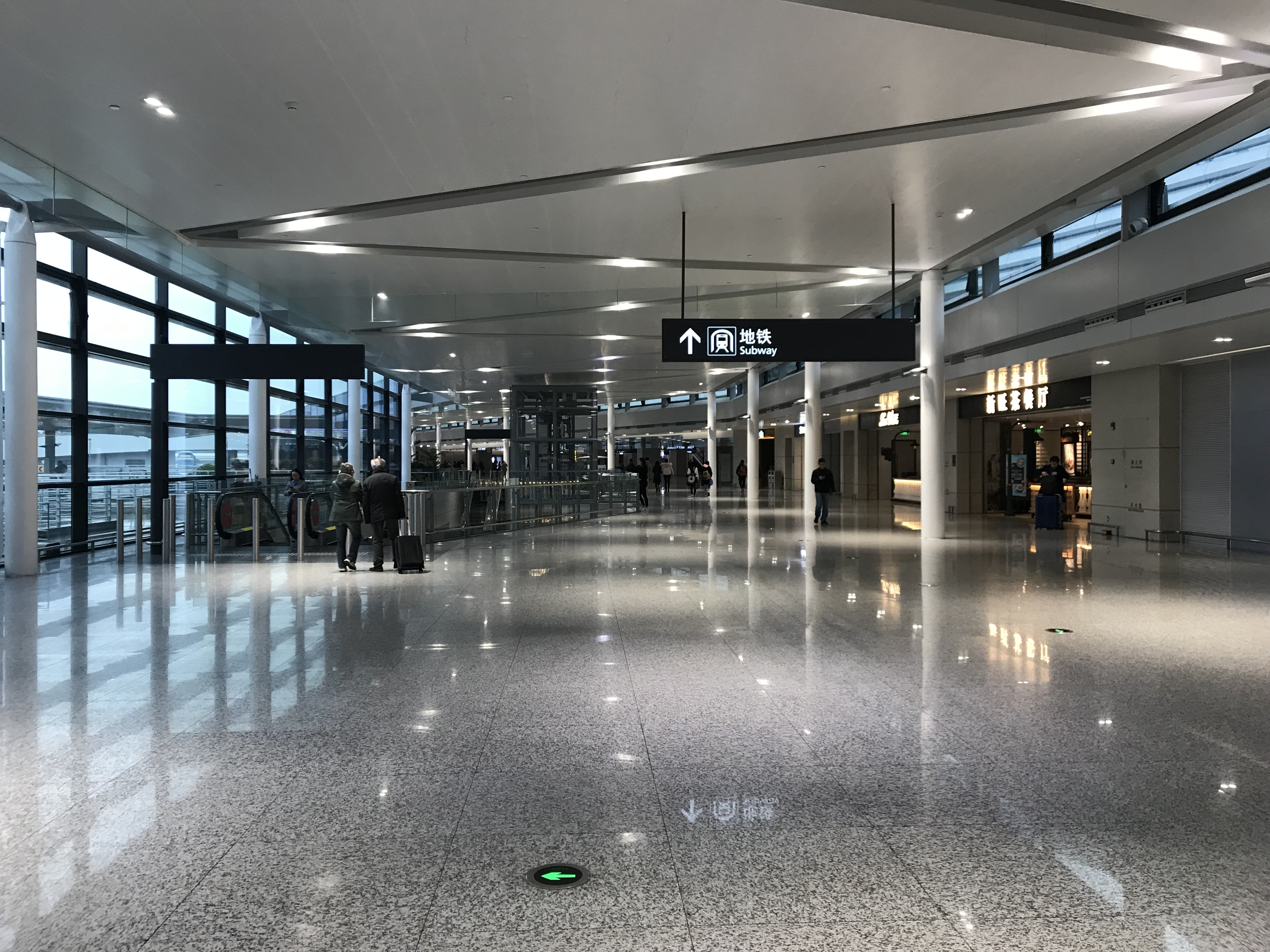
Terminal 1 arrivals concourse

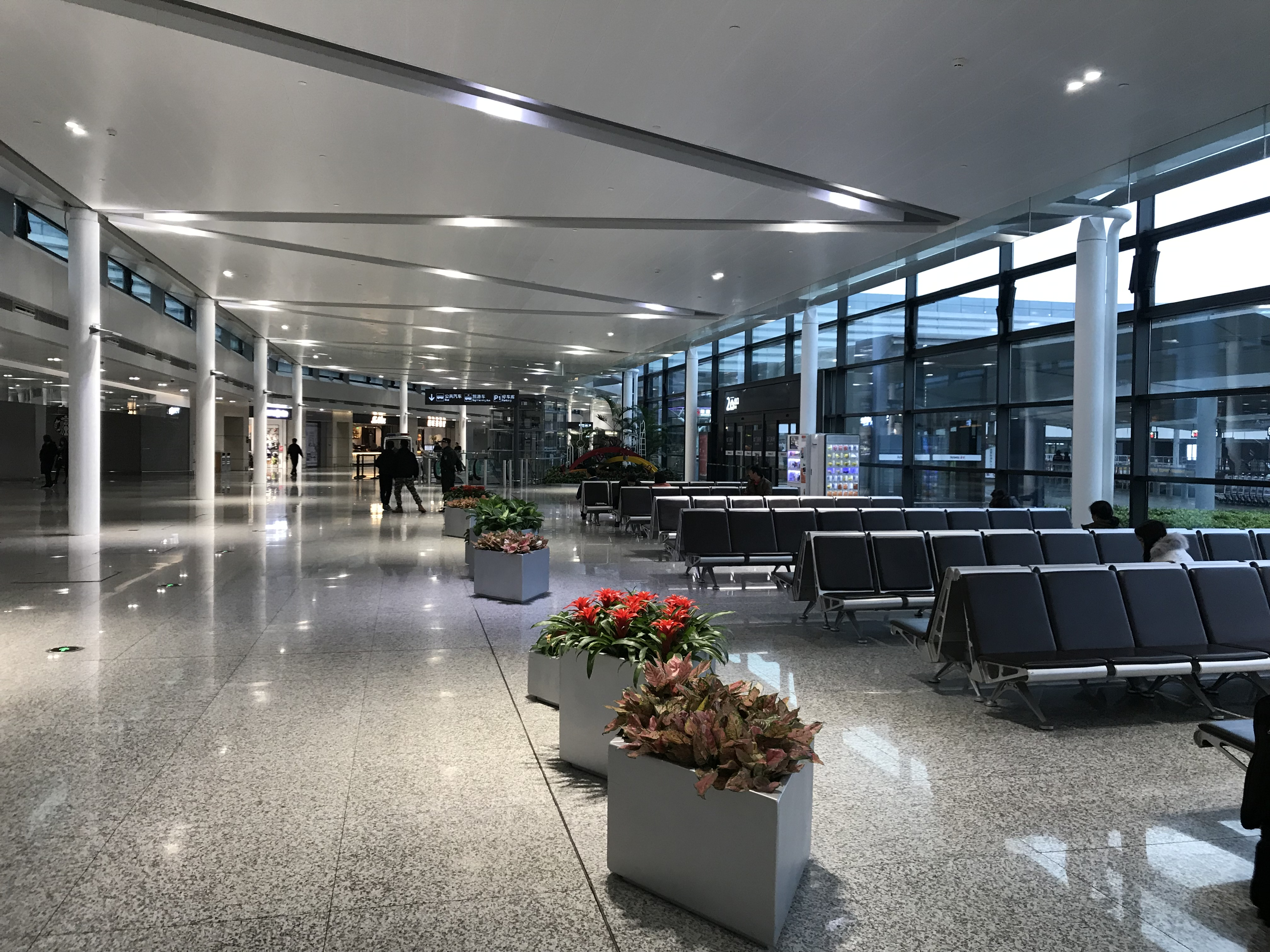
Terminal 1 resting area

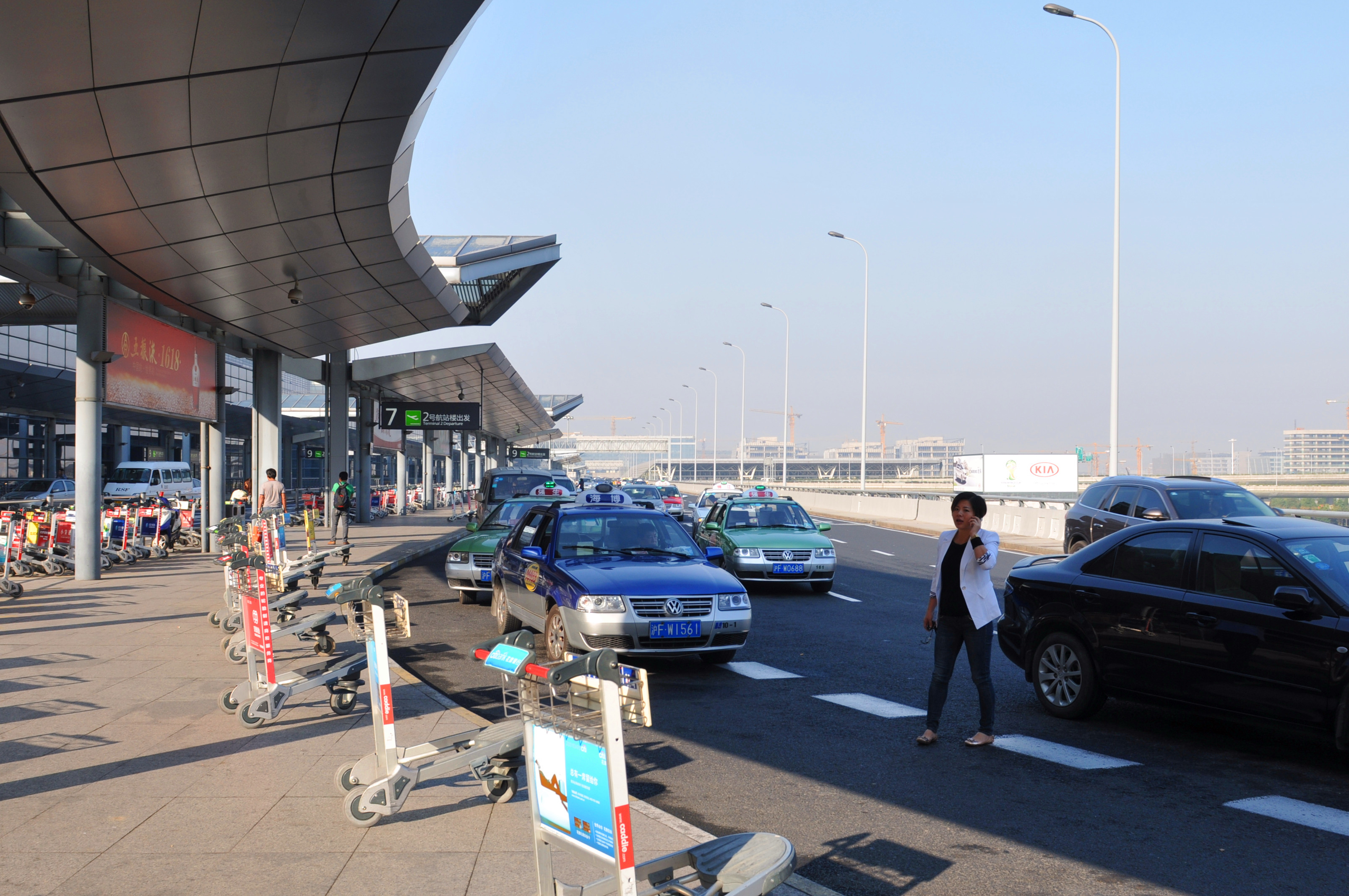
Terminal 2 departures

The construction of Hongqiao Airport started in 1921. In May 1923, the airport opened for mixed civilian use. The Chinese Air Force deployed fighter-attack planes to Hongqiao in an operational response to the Shanghai Incident of 1932, and engaging Japanese carrier-based planes for the first time that day. In 1937, Hongqiao was the site of the so-called 'Oyama Incident' in which a Japanese lieutenant was shot dead by Chinese Peace Preservation Corps soldiers in the lead-up to the Battle of Shanghai. During the Second Sino-Japanese War, the airport was occupied by the Japanese and used as an air force base. Its military use continued after being handed over to the Republic of China government and, later, the People's Republic of China government. From late 1963, it was rebuilt for civilian use and was reopened in April 1964. A major expansion took place from March to September 1984, and another from December 1988 to December 1991.

=== International era (1964–1999) ===
In 1964, the original Terminal 1 and the control tower opened to the public. The terminal was entirely built by China itself and was advanced for its time, equipped with many modern facilities such as barbershops, bookstores, banks, cafes, telecommunication offices, canteens, and even a hotel. The first international charter flight to Hongqiao was Pakistan International Airlines Boeing 720 from Dhaka with a stopover from Guangzhou, making it one of the very few non-communist airlines to fly into China before the Cultural Revolution. In the mid-1960s, Air France and Lufthansa both began service directly from Phnom Penh; however they were both suspended not long after. In 1972, the airport was visited by U.S. President Richard Nixon using Air Force One before flying to Peking during his visit to China.

In 1974, Japan Airlines began services from Haneda to Hongqiao. In 1979, CAAC Airlines began services from Hongqiao to Nagasaki using a Boeing 707 aircraft; by 1985, a Trident was used for just two flights a week. After China's reform and opening up in 1978, it then evolved into one of the busiest airports in China, alongside Beijing-Capital, particularly due to increasing passenger demand. Since 1981, Hongqiao Airport became a popular stopover for many airlines flying from Beijing to many other countries such as Canada, Japan and United States in particular. In 1985, Airbus-built aircraft started having hubs in this airport, due to it being delivered to the CAAC's Shanghai division (which would then become China Eastern Airlines). Additionally, at that same decade, many foreign airlines like Pan Am, United Airlines, Singapore Airlines, Northwest Airlines, Cathay Pacific (Dragonair replaced the Hong Kong-Shanghai route sometime in the early 1990s), Canadian Pacific Air Lines (which then became Canadian Airlines International) began operating in Hongqiao around that time. During its international era, Hongqiao Airport was much different from today. It only had one 3,400 m (11,154 ft 10 in) runway at the time, Terminal 1 was its main terminal, and its former control tower was renovated sometime after Pudong Airport opened.

In the 1990s, many more foreign airlines began serving the airport compared to the previous decade. Examples are All Nippon Airways, KLM, Lufthansa, Thai Airways International, Swissair, Air France, Malaysia Airlines, Korean Air, Garuda Indonesia, Air Macau, Royal Nepal Airlines, Asiana Airlines, Aeroflot, and Qantas.

=== Domestic era (2002–present) ===
The airport presently offers mainly domestic flights except the cities in Northeast China (except Shenyang (MU and FM fly once daily) and Harbin (MU flies once daily), Baotou, Tongren, Zhanjiang, Zhangjiajie and other Chinese cities not served at SHA (which they all are operating at Pudong Airport only instead), as well as five international routes to central Tokyo's Haneda Airport, central Seoul's Gimpo International Airport, central Taipei Songshan Airport, Hong Kong International Airport, and Macau's Macau International Airport. Previously, there were flights to Huaian from the airport until all flights to Huai'an were moved to Pudong Airport in May 2018.

Since 1 January 2013, holders of valid passports issued by 45 countries have not needed a visa if transiting through Hongqiao Airport.

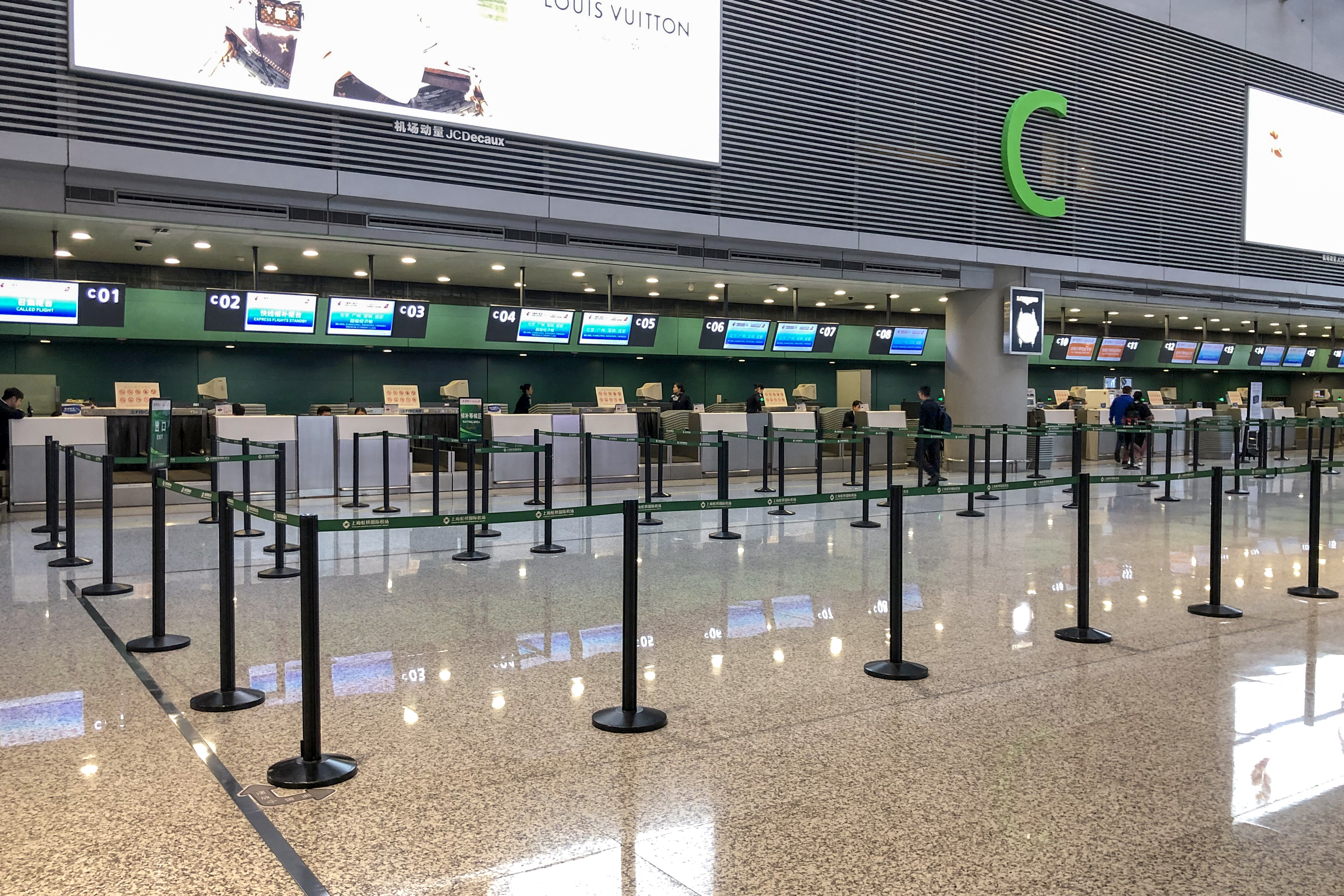
China Eastern Airlines check-in area at Terminal 2

In preparation for the Shanghai Expo, on 16 March 2010, Hongqiao Airport completed a five-year 15.3-billion-yuan expansion project, which included a 3,300-meter (10,826 ft 9 in) second runway and the new Terminal 2, boosting Hongqiao's capacity to 40 million passengers a year. Terminal 2 is four times the size of Terminal 1 and houses almost 80% of domestic airlines at the airport (Terminal 1 is now used only for international flights, Spring Airlines, Hebei Airlines and XiamenAir). With the new runway, Shanghai became the first city in China to have five (now seven) runways for civilian use (Pudong and Hongqiao combined).

Starting from the end of 2014, Hongqiao Airport Terminal 1 underwent its biggest renovation since 1921. The entire project was scheduled for completion in 2017. On 26 March 2017, Building A of Terminal 1 was fully renovated and reopened to the public. The old Building B was closed for reconstruction, and it was expected to be revamped and open to the public in mid-2018.

International flights were suspended on 25 March 2020 due to the COVID-19 pandemic. From 25 March 2020, all flights from the airport were domestic to other cities in mainland China. International flights resumed from the airport on 26 March 2023.

== Airlines and destinations ==
=== Passenger ===
Airlines	Destinations
Air China	Beijing–Capital, Chengdu–Shuangliu, Chongqing, Guangzhou, Taipei–Songshan, Tianjin
Air Macau	Macau
All Nippon Airways	Tokyo–Haneda
Asiana Airlines	Seoul–Gimpo
Cathay Pacific	Hong Kong
Chengdu Airlines	Chengdu–Shuangliu
China Airlines	Taipei–Songshan
China Eastern Airlines	Beijing–Capital, Beijing–Daxing, Cangyuan, Changchun, Changsha, Chengdu–Shuangliu, Chengdu–Tianfu, Chongqing, Dali, Daqing, Diqing, Enshi, Fuzhou, Ganzhou, Guangzhou, Guiyang, Harbin, Haliar, Hohhot, Hong Kong, Jiayuguan, Jieyang, Jinan, Kashgar, Kunming, Kuqa, Lanzhou, Lhasa, Lijiang, Linyi, Liuzhou, Luoyang, Macau, Mangshi, Mudanjiang, Nanchang, Ordos, Qingdao, Sanming, Sanya, Seoul–Gimpo, Shenyang, Shenzhen, Taipei–Songshan, Taiyuan, Tianjin, Tokyo–Haneda, Ulanhot, Ürümqi, Weihai, Wenshan, Wuhai, Wuhan, Wuyishan, Xiamen, Xi'an, Xining, Xinyang, Yancheng, Yanji, Yantai, Yinchuan, Yulin (Shaanxi), Zhaosu, Zhengzhou, Zhuhai
China Southern Airlines	Beijing–Daxing, Guangzhou, Guiyang, Kashgar, Shenzhen, Ürümqi, Zhengzhou
China United Airlines	Beijing–Daxing, Foshan
EVA Air	Taipei–Songshan
Hainan Airlines	Beijing–Capital, Guangzhou, Haikou, Shenzhen
Hebei Airlines	Shijiazhuang
Hong Kong Airlines	Hong Kong
Japan Airlines	Tokyo–Haneda
Juneyao Air	Beijing–Daxing, Changsha, Chengdu–Tianfu, Chizhou, Chongqing, Datong, Guangzhou, Guiyang, Haikou, Hailar, Kunming, Lanzhou, Nanning, Sanya, Shenzhen, Taiyuan, Ürümqi, Wuhan, Xiamen, Xi'an, Xiangyang, Zhuhai
Korean Air	Seoul–Gimpo
Lucky Air	Kunming
Shandong Airlines	Chongqing, Jinan, Qingdao, Xiamen, Yantai, Zhuhai
Shanghai Airlines	Beihai, Beijing–Daxing, Changsha, Chengdu–Shuangliu, Chongqing, Fuyang, Fuzhou, Guangzhou, Guiyang, Haikou, Hailar, Hohhot, Hong Kong, Jiamusi, Jieyang, Jinggangshan, Jixi, Kunming, Lanzhou, Macau, Nanchang, Nanning, Qingdao, Qiqihar, Quanzhou, Sanya, Seoul–Gimpo, Shenyang, Shenzhen, Taipei–Songshan, Taiyuan, Tianjin, Tokyo–Haneda, Ürümqi, Wuhan, Xiamen, Xi'an, Xishuangbanna, Yantai, Yinchuan, Zhengzhou, Zhuhai
Shenzhen Airlines	Guangzhou, Jingdezhen, Shenzhen
Spring Airlines	Changde, Chengdu–Tianfu, Chongqing, Dongying, Dunhuang, Guangzhou, Guiyang, Hailar, Hengyang, Jieyang, Kunming, Lanzhou, Qingdao, Qingyang, Quanzhou, Sanya, Shenzhen, Shijiazhuang, Ürümqi, Xiamen, Xi'an, Xining, Zhangjiakou
Tianjin Airlines	Tianjin
XiamenAir	Changsha, Chongqing, Fuzhou, Hohhot, Luzhou, Quanzhou, Shenzhen, Tianjin, Xiamen, Zhuhai
Xizang Airlines	Chengdu–Shuangliu

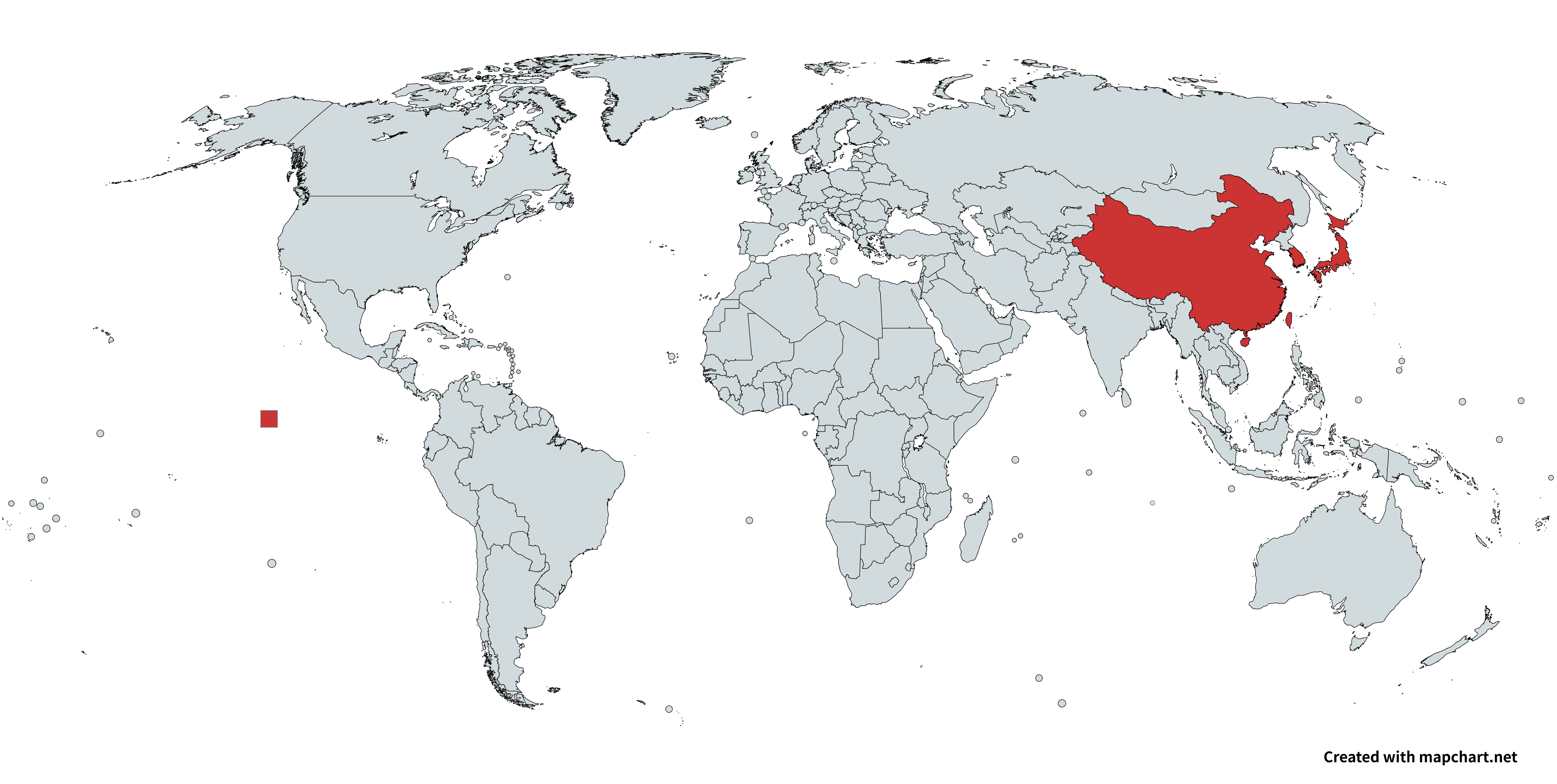
As of February 2026.

== Other facilities ==
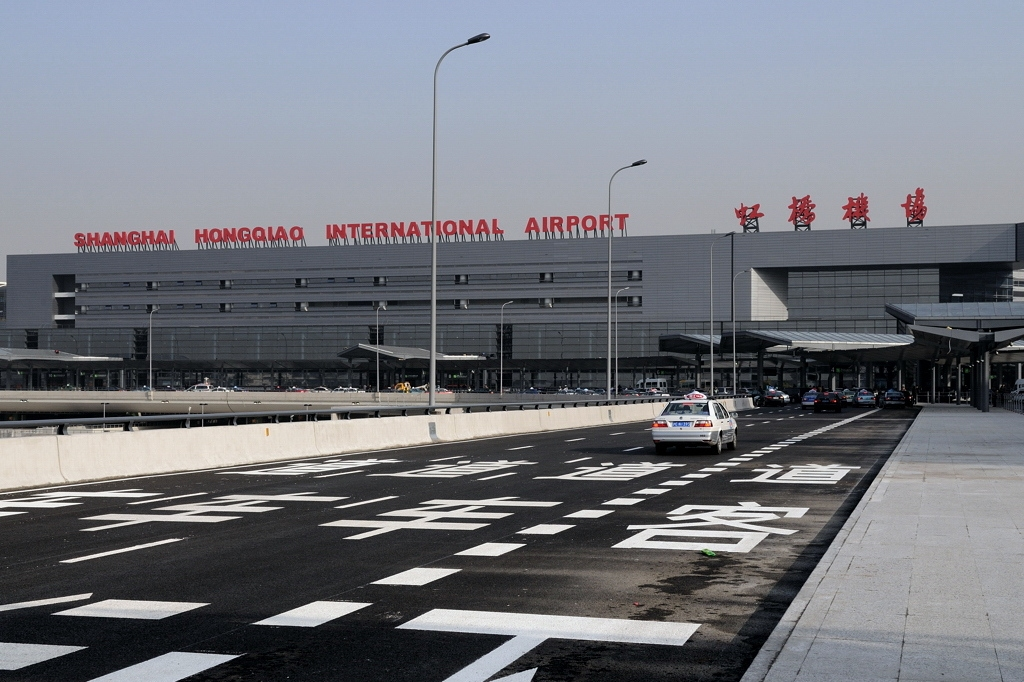
Airport terminal exterior

The airport has the head office of China Eastern Airlines, which is housed in the China Eastern Airlines Building, and was the head office of China Cargo Airlines.

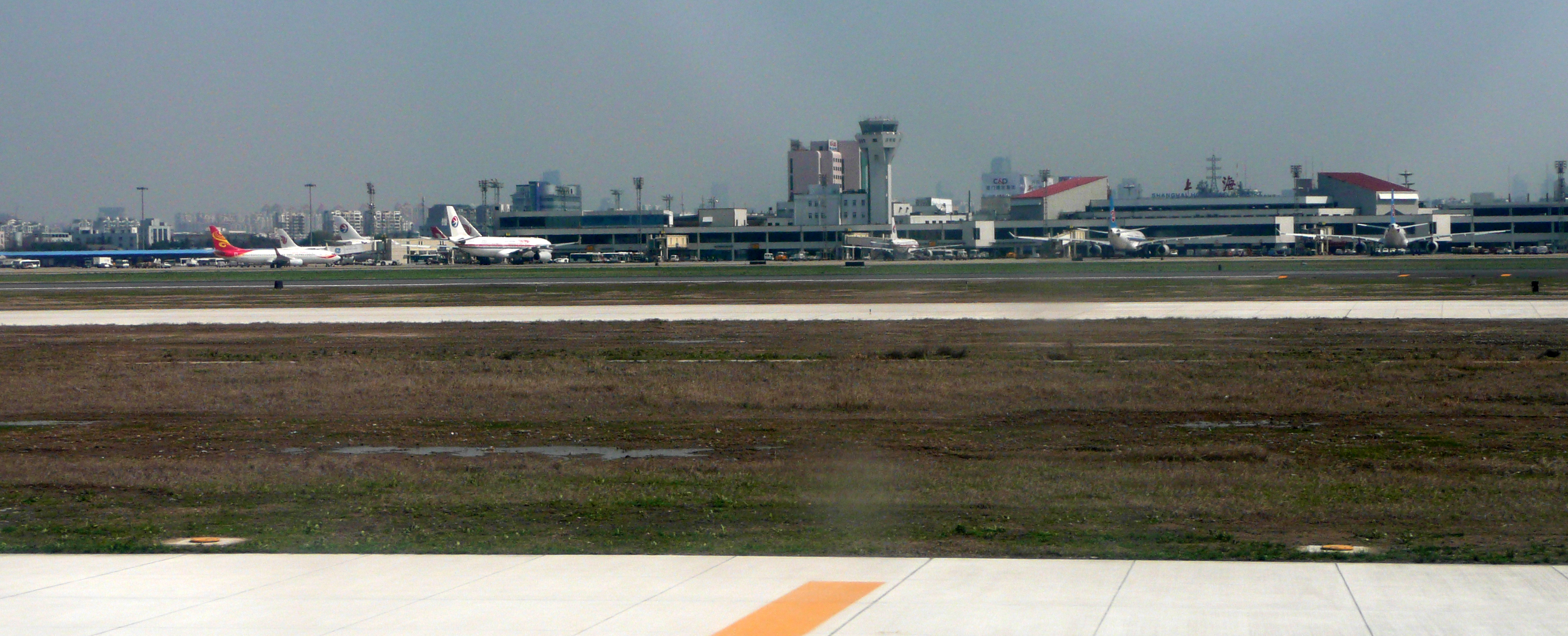
Apron of Hongqiao Airport

== Ground transportation ==
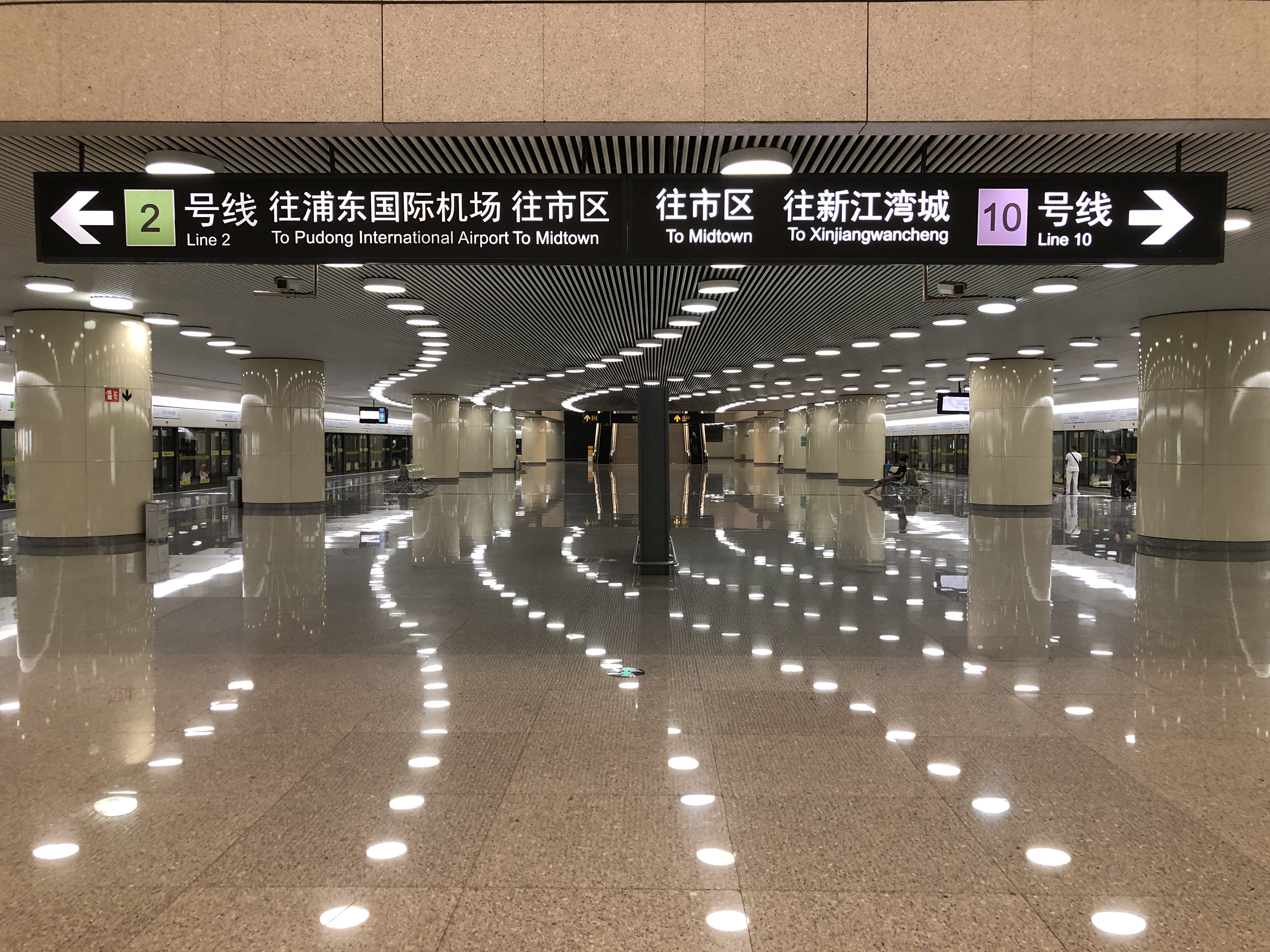
Platform of Hongqiao Airport Terminal 2 Station (Line 2 & 10)

Terminal 2 of the Hongqiao Airport is immediately adjacent to Shanghai Hongqiao railway station, a major train hub served by the Beijing–Shanghai High-Speed Railway, the Shanghai–Hangzhou High-Speed Railway and the Shanghai–Nanjing Intercity High-Speed Railway. The airport's other terminal, Terminal 1, is across the airfield from Terminal 2.

The airport and the railway station are served by three stations of the metro network:

- Hongqiao Railway Station: Line 2, Line 10, Line 17
- Hongqiao Airport Terminal 2 station: Line 2, Line 10, Airport Link Line
- Hongqiao Airport Terminal 1 station: Line 10

The proposed extension of the Shanghai Maglev Train from Longyang Road through Shanghai South railway station to Hongqiao would connect the two airports. At top speed, the maglev would take only 15 minutes to travel the 55 km (34 mi) route. Original plans called for completing the extension by 2010, in time for the Expo 2010; however, the Hongqiao extension has been indefinitely postponed due to protests. Instead, a direct connection to Shanghai Pudong Airport was established in December 2024 with the Airport Link Line.

== Accidents and incidents ==
- On 17 September 1982, Japan Airlines Flight 792, a Douglas DC-8-61 en route to Tokyo Narita Airport, made an emergency landing, overran the runway and crashed into a drainage ditch after the hydraulic system and airbrake pressure failed, injuring 39 of the 223 passengers and crew on board.
- On 15 August 1989, a China Eastern Airlines Flight 5510, an Antonov An-24 en route to Nanchang, overran the runway and crashed into a river following an engine failure, killing 34 of the 40 occupants.
- On 10 September 1998, China Eastern Airlines Flight 586, a McDonnell Douglas MD-11 en route to Beijing, made an emergency landing at the airport after the landing gear had not retracted properly; all 137 occupants on board survived.
- On 15 April 1999, Korean Air Lines Flight 6316, an MD-11F en route to Seoul, crashed shortly after takeoff, killing all three occupants onboard and five people on the ground.
- On 13 August 2011, Qatar Airways Flight 888, a Boeing 777-300ER en route from Doha International Airport to Shanghai Pudong International Airport, declared a low-fuel emergency and diverted to Hongqiao. Air traffic control at Hongqiao ordered Juneyao Airlines Flight 1112, en route from Shenzhen Bao'an International Airport to Hongqiao, to terminate its approach and allow Flight 888 to land. The crew of Flight 1112 ignored repeated orders to abort their landing, forcing Flight 888 to go-around. Both aircraft landed safely without injury or damage to the aircraft.
- On 7 June 2013, China Eastern Airlines Flight 2947, an Embraer EMB-145LI flying from Huai'an Lianshui Airport to Shanghai Hongqiao International Airport veered off of runway 18L at Hongqiao during landing. The plane came to a stop on an adjacent taxiway with its nose gear collapsed. No passengers or crew suffered any injuries; however, the plane received substantial damage.
- On 11 October 2016, China Eastern Airlines Flight 5643, an Airbus A320, nearly collided with Flight 5106 of the same airline, an Airbus A330, when the former was taking off on runway 36L while the latter was crossing the same runway under wrong instruction. Flight 5643 performed a TOGA takeoff and passed over Flight 5106, avoiding a collision.

== See also ==
- List of airports in China
- List of the busiest airports in China
