= Xiangtang (disambiguation) =

Xiangtang may refer to the following locations in China:

- Xiangtang, Hebei (响堂镇), town in Luan County
- Xiangtang, Jiangxi (向塘镇), town in Nanchang County
  - Xiangtang Railway Station (向塘站), on the Beijing–Kowloon Railway
  - Xiangtang West Railway Station (向塘西站), on the Beijing–Kowloon and Zhejiang–Jiangxi Railways
- Xiangtang Subdistrict (响堂街道), Haicheng, Liaoning
