= Spring Japan =

Low-cost airline of Japan

Spring Japan Co., Ltd. スプリング・ジャパン株式会社 Spring Japan Kabushiki-gaisha

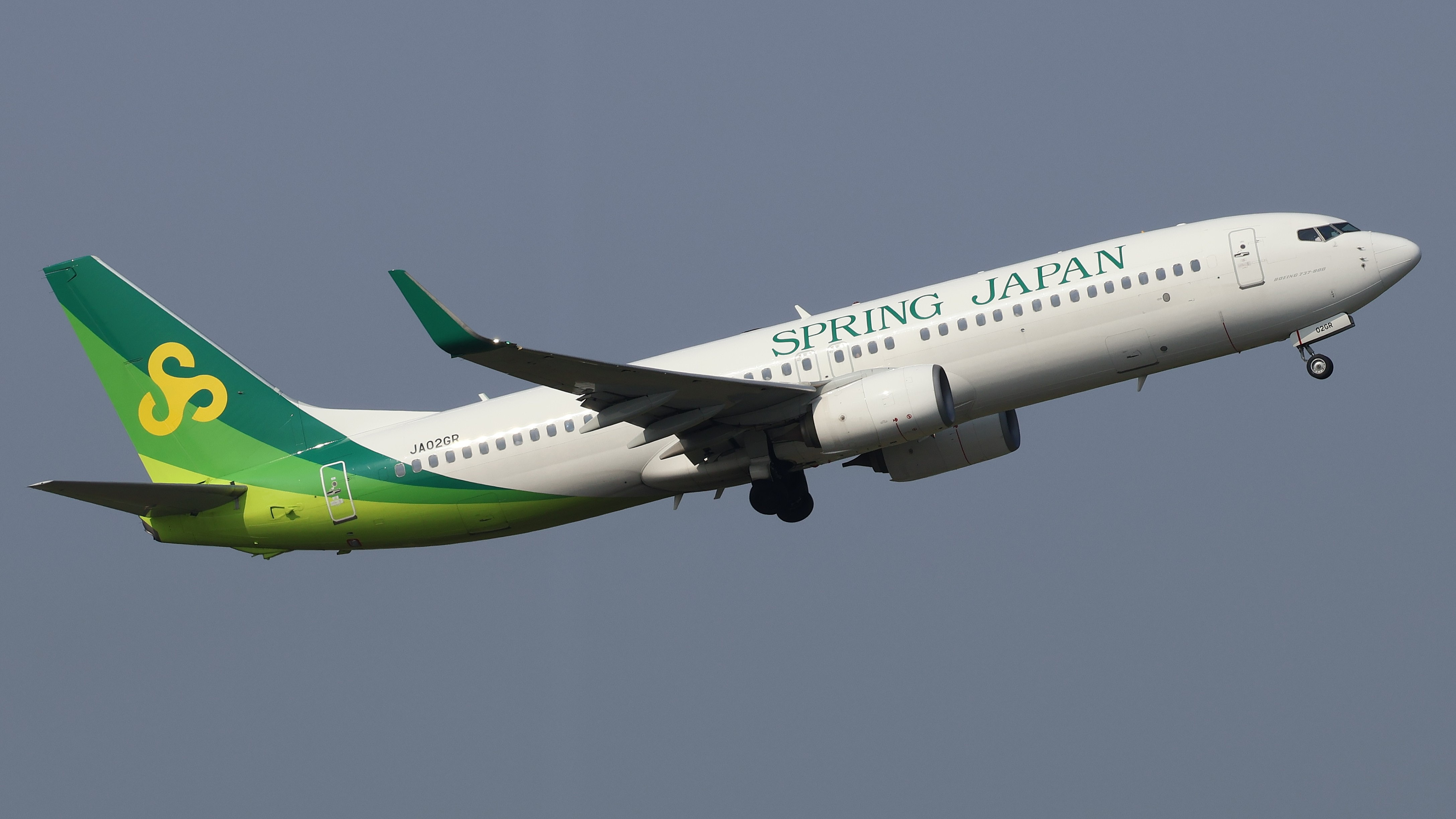
- A Spring Japan Boeing 737-800
IATA	ICAO	Call sign
IJ	SJO	JEY SPRING
- Founded: October 2012; 14 years ago (as Spring Airlines Japan)
- Commenced operations: 1 August 2014; 12 years ago (as Spring Airlines Japan)
- Operating bases: Narita International Airport
- Fleet size: 9
- Destinations: 7
- Parent company: JAL Group (70%); Spring Airlines (30%)
- Headquarters: Kozunomori, Narita, Chiba Prefecture, Japan
- Key people: Hiroshi Ukai (Representative Director)
- Total equity: JPY 6 billion
- Website: jp.ch.com

Spring Japan, previously Spring Airlines Japan, is a low-cost airline headquartered in Kozunomori, Narita, Chiba Prefecture, Japan. The airline began operations in August 2014, having originally planned to begin operations in autumn 2013. It is a joint venture between Japan Airlines and Chinese low-cost carrier Spring Airlines, although JAL holds a majority stake in the operation.

== History ==
Chinese Spring Airlines announced in 2011 that it had plans to establish a subsidiary in Japan; it would be the first Chinese airline to do so. Spring Airlines was required to find one or more local partners due to Japanese legal restrictions that would limit its investment to a minority stake. When it launched, the airline was 33% owned by Spring Airlines, a Chinese low-cost carrier, with the remainder held by various Japanese investors. The airline is now majority-owned and controlled by Japan Airlines.

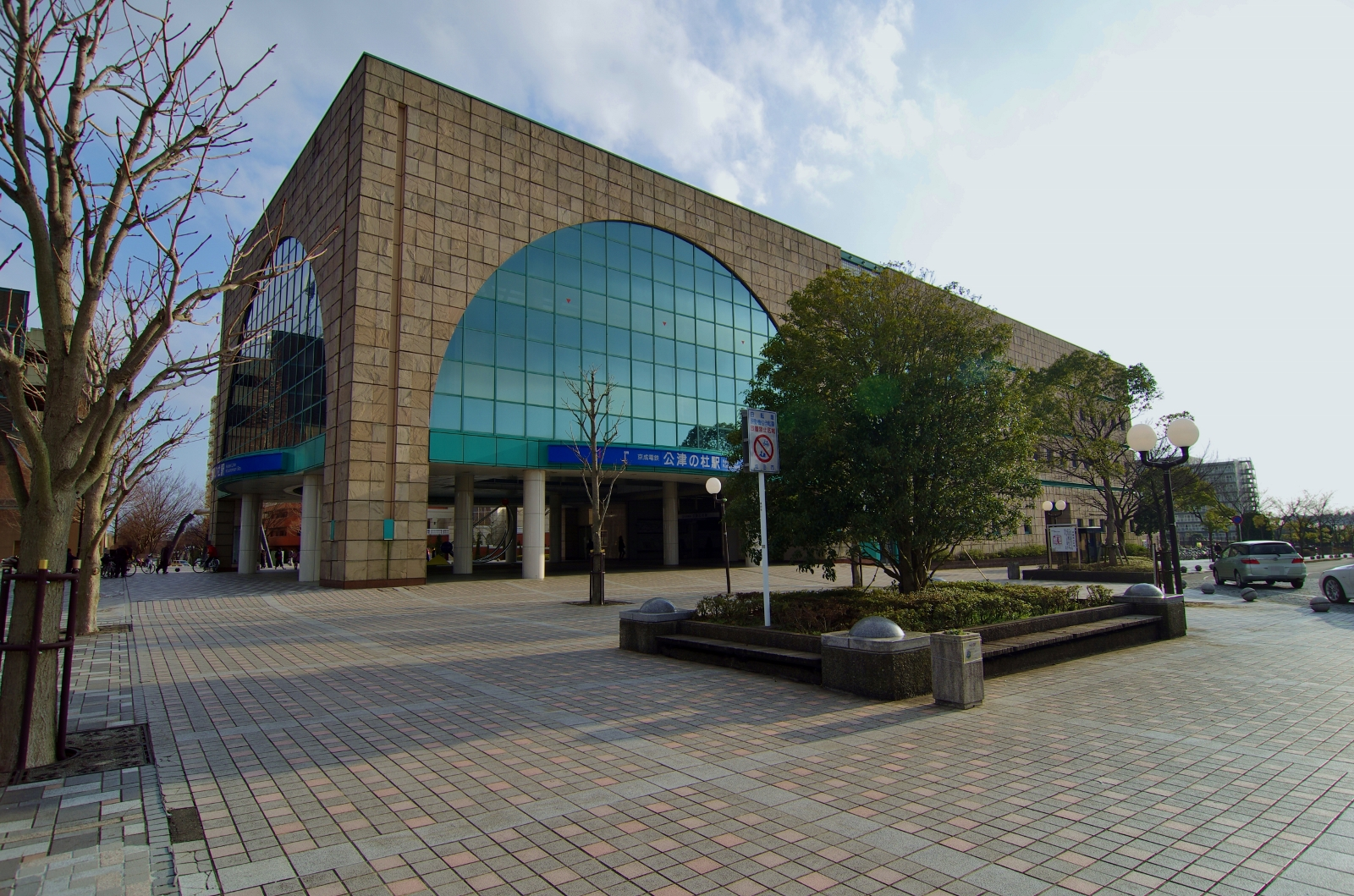
Spring Airlines Japan headquarters in Narita

The airline received an air operator's certificate on 17 December 2013, having filed in September 2013 with 1.5 billion yen of equity capital, of which Spring Airlines invested 33%. The remainder of the airline's capital was provided by Japanese financial institutions, IT enterprises and trading companies, among others. There were plans to raise a further 4.5 billion yen of capital prior to commencement of operations. Japanese travel agency JTB announced in March 2014 that it would invest in Spring Airlines Japan and enter a partnership with the airline to provide Japan tour packages to Chinese customers.

Spring Airlines Japan planned to use primarily Japanese staff, such as former Japan Airlines (JAL) pilots. Its head of operations, Minoru Uchida, was formerly a JAL pilot.

In July 2021, JAL Group increased its capital and expanded its shares, and Spring Airlines' shareholding in the company was reduced from 56% to 30%; while JAL Group's investment ratio to Spring Airlines Japan increased to two-thirds, and Spring Airlines Japan became a subsidiary of JAL Group.

In October, the company name was changed from "Spring Airlines Japan Co., Ltd." to "Spring Japan Co., Ltd."

== Destinations ==
The airline serves the following destinations:

Country	City	Airport	Notes	Refs
China	Beijing	Beijing Capital International Airport		
China	Harbin	Harbin Taiping International Airport		
China	Ningbo	Ningbo Lishe International Airport		
China	Shanghai	Shanghai Pudong International Airport		
China	Tianjin	Tianjin Binhai International Airport		
Japan	Hiroshima	Hiroshima Airport		
Japan	Sapporo	New Chitose Airport		
Japan	Tokyo	Narita International Airport	Base	

=== Codeshare agreements ===
Spring Japan has codeshare agreements with the following airlines:

- Japan Airlines

== Fleet ==
=== Current fleet ===
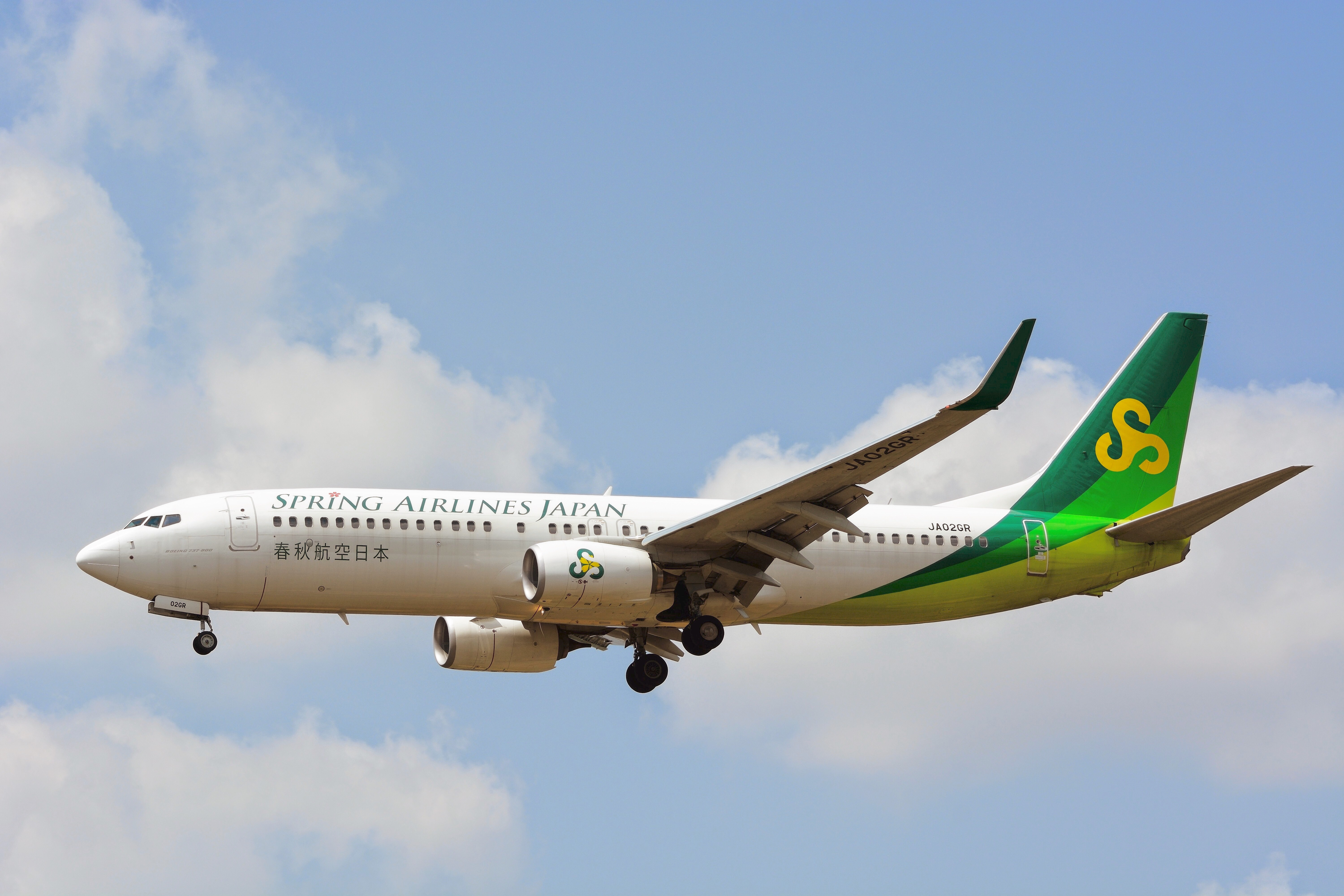
Spring Japan Boeing 737-800

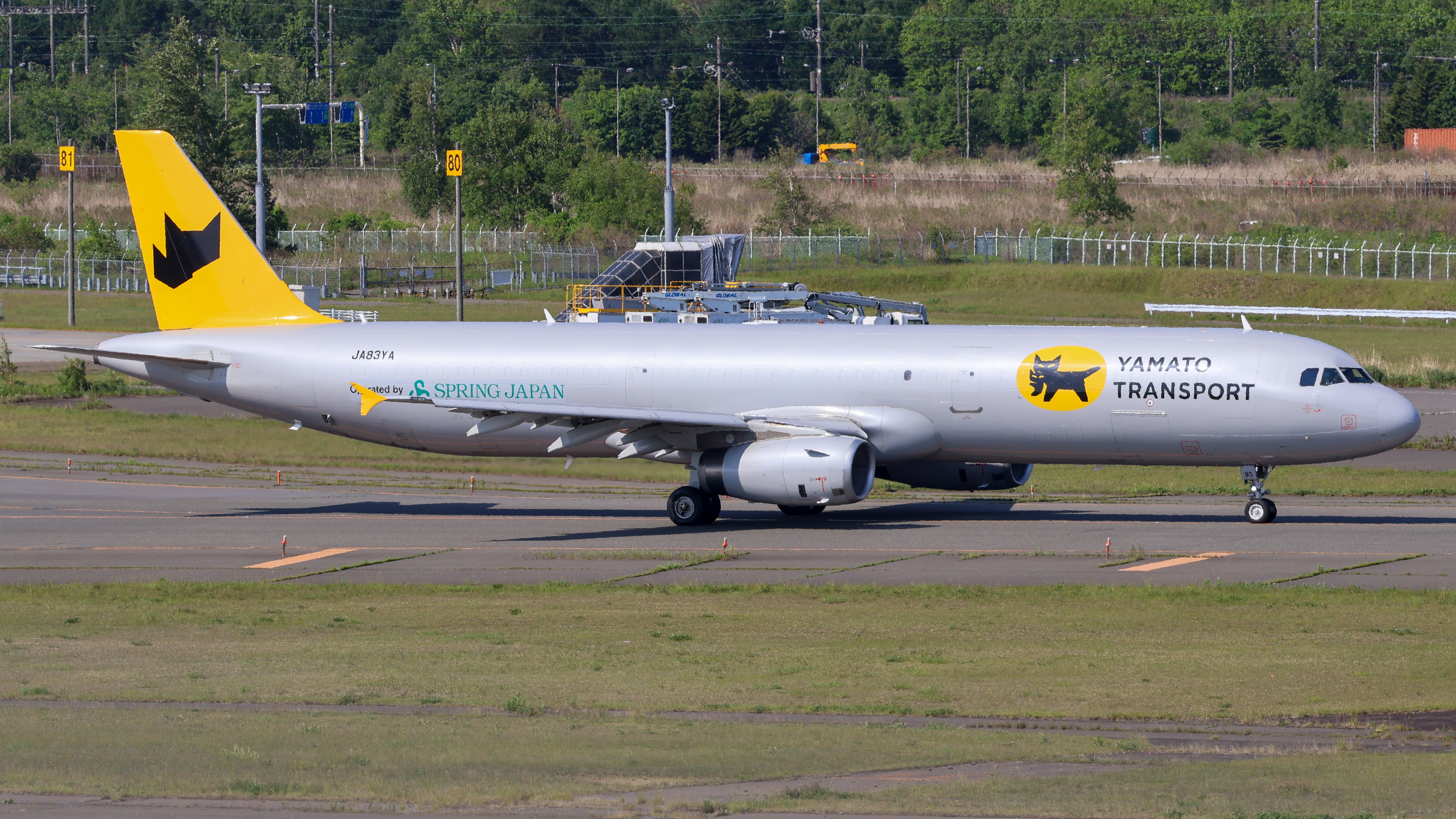
Spring Japan Airbus A321P2F in Yamato Transport livery

As of July 2026, Spring Japan operates the following aircraft: The passenger aircraft are fitted in a 189-seat configuration with 18 seats (the first three rows) curtained off as a premium cabin.

Spring Japan fleet
Passenger fleet
Aircraft	In Fleet	Orders	Passengers			Notes
Aircraft	In Fleet	Orders	W	Y	Total	Notes
Boeing 737-800	6	—	18	171	189	
Cargo fleet
Airbus A321-200/P2F	3	—	Cargo			Operated on behalf of Yamato Transport.
Total	9	—				

=== Fleet development ===
Spring Airlines Japan took delivery of its first aircraft, a Boeing 737-800, on 17 July 2013. Although Spring Airlines uses Airbus A320 aircraft, the 737 was chosen for its Japanese subsidiary due to Boeing's greater popularity among Japanese airlines and the relative ease of finding 737-qualified pilots.

In November 2022, Japan Airlines announced it had ordered 3 Airbus A321P2F freighters starting in spring 2024. The aircraft are to be operated by Spring Japan in partnership with Yamato Holdings, which owns the Japanese courier Yamato Transport. The start of these services was prompted by the Japanese government restricting truck driver's yearly overtime to 960hrs, going into effect in spring 2024. The first aircraft, JA81YA, was delivered on November 6, 2023, in Yamato Transport's livery. All 3 freighters are to wear the Yamato livery.

=== Former fleet ===
As of August 2025, Spring Japan operated 6 Boeing 737-800 and 3 Airbus A321P2F.
