= China Eastern Airlines Flight 586 =

1998 aviation incident in China

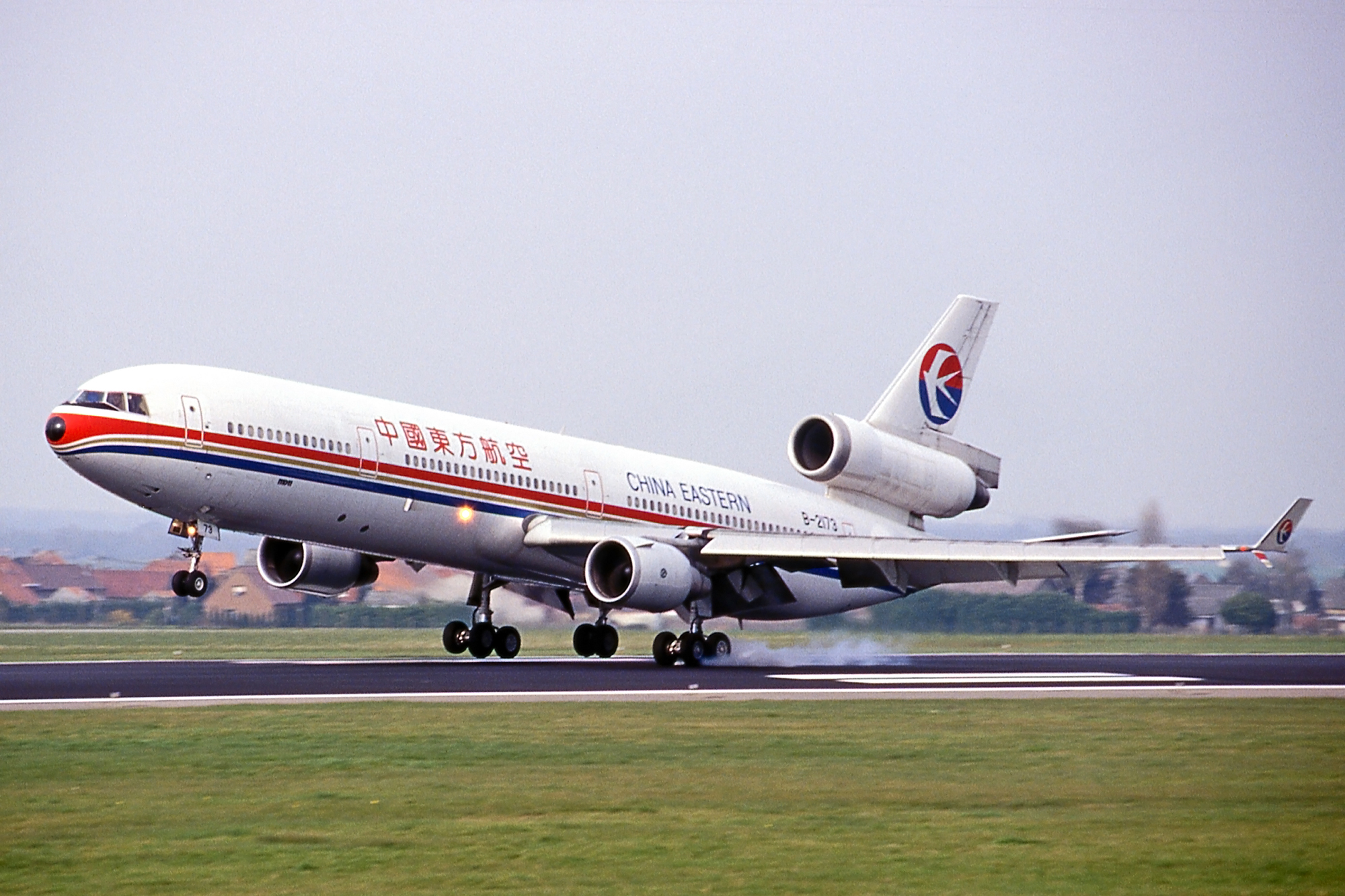
- B-2173, the aircraft involved in the accident

Incident
- Date: 10 September 1998
- Summary: Landing gear failure
- Site: Shanghai Hongqiao International Airport, China

Aircraft
- Aircraft type: McDonnell Douglas MD-11
- Operator: China Eastern Airlines
- IATA flight No.: MU586
- ICAO flight No.: CES586
- Call sign: CHINA EASTERN 586
- Registration: B-2173
- Flight origin: Shanghai Hongqiao International Airport, China
- Stopover: Beijing Capital International Airport, China
- Destination: Los Angeles International Airport, United States
- Occupants: 137
- Passengers: 120
- Crew: 17
- Fatalities: 0
- Injuries: 9
- Survivors: 137

China Eastern Airlines Flight 586 was a passenger flight from Shanghai, China to Los Angeles, United States with a stop at Beijing, China. On 10 September 1998, the McDonnell Douglas MD-11 suffered landing gear failure, and returned back to Shanghai Hongqiao International Airport with a nose-up landing. All 137 survived the incident, though 6 passengers and 3 crew members were injured during the evacuation.The incident was considered the first successful emergency landing involving a civil aviation aircraft in China.

== Background ==
=== Aircraft ===
The aircraft involved was a McDonnell Douglas MD-11 registered as B-2173. It was delivered to China Eastern Airlines in 1992, the same year it was produced. Before the incident, the plane had acquired 4,810 flight hours and 1,571 cycles.

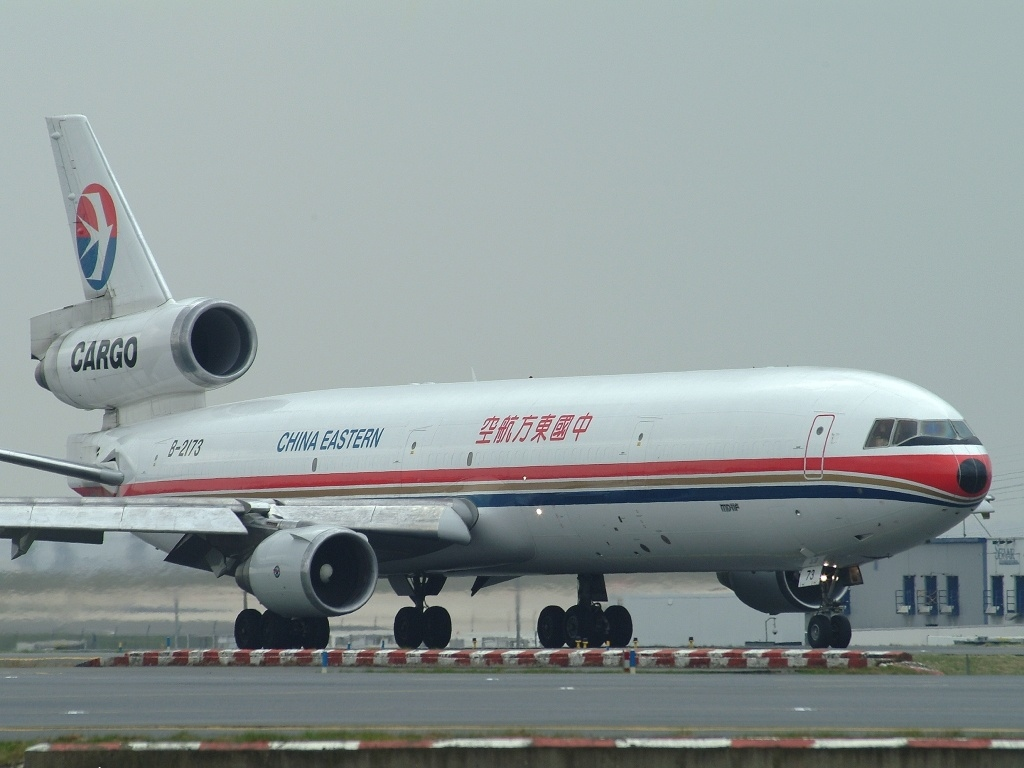
The aircraft involved, pictured in 2003 under its freighter conversion

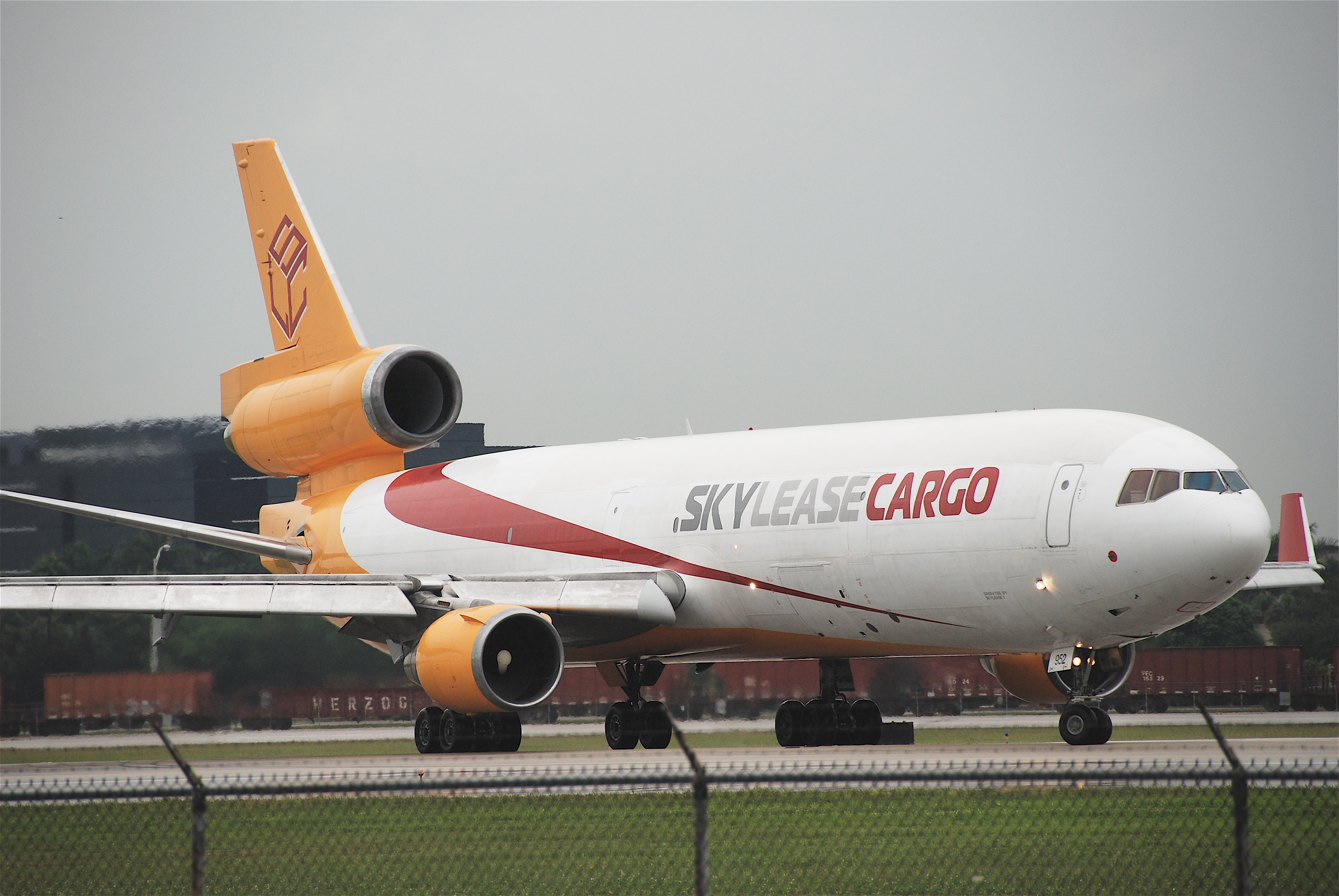
Also the aircraft involved, pictured in 2011 as a Sky Lease Cargo's aircraft

After the incident, the plane was repaired. In 2000, the plane was converted into a freighter, and was owned by China Cargo Airlines five years later. In 2010, it was purchased to Sky Lease Cargo with a registration of N952AR before being scrapped out in 2017.

=== Crew members ===
The 17 crew members of the incident were:

1. Captain: Ni Jiexiang (倪介祥）
2. First officer: Yan Baodi (严宝弟）
3. Flight Engineer: Zhao Yongliang (赵永亮）
4. Navigator: Lu Ge (鲁舸）
5. Supervisor: Xu Huanju (徐焕菊）
6. Chief flight attendant: Shu Ye (舒晔)
7. Chief flight attendant: Liu Wen (刘文）
8. Flight attendant: Li Ronghua (李蓉华)
9. Flight attendant: Hu Jun Yi (胡骏奕)
10. Flight attendant: Dai Yizun (戴益遵)
11. Flight attendant: Tao Zhi (陶冶)
12. Flight attendant: Ruan Jia (阮佳)
13. Flight attendant: Lu Yiying (陆轶颖)
14. Flight attendant: Cai Shali (蔡沙里)
15. Flight attendant: Luo Wei (罗薇)
16. Flight attendant: Wu Ying (吴颖)
17. Flight attendant: Zhou Zhuqing (周竹青)

All 17 of them would later be praised by the Civil Aviation Administration of China and the Shanghai Municipal Government on October 30, 1998.

== Incident ==
At 19:38, the flight took off from Shanghai Hongqiao International Airport, carrying 120 passengers and 17 crew members. As the plane lifted, Ni Jiexiang noticed that the nose gear's light remained red, indicating that the gear was not properly retracted. Two low flyovers were made, and the gear problem was confirmed by the controller. The crew had made several attempts by making sharp climbs and descents, circling at a steep angle, cross-operating the hydraulics, and a hard landing to deployed the gear, but the measures failed to do so.

Realizing that they could only perform an emergency landing, Xu Huanju ordered the passengers to sit in the middle and rear sections as much as possible; meanwhile, Ni Jiexiang mainly performed the emergency landing with Yan Baodi responsible for pulling the throttle of engine number 1 and 3 to idle after touchdown. Zhao Yongliang was responsible for pulling down the speed brakes and all engine master switches, in addition to extinguishing the engine fires.

External videos
- Footage of the landing on YouTube

At 23:07, the plane descended down with its main landing gears touched first.Then, the nose dipped and scraped the ground, bright sparks flew across the runway. After sliding approximately 380 meters, the aircraft came to a stop on the runway without explosion or fire. The crew members evacuated all passengers and crew. As the passengers were disembarking the plane, firefighters sprayed water on the plane to prevent it from catching fire and assisted passengers in leaving the scene.

== Investigation ==
After a month of investigating, it is determined that a broken pin in the nose landing gear led to landing gear retraction failure. Experts concluded that the pin contained an excessively high concentration of a certain metal component, resulting in an unreasonable composition. This resulted in the metal to crack.

== In popular culture ==
In 1999, the incident was adapted into a film named "Crash Landing" by Shanghai Film Studio - the first film of China to be based on an aviation accident.

== See also ==
- China Eastern Airlines Flight 583 - sistership of the aircraft involved
- Iran Air Flight 742 - similar circumstances
- Virgin Atlantic Flight 024 - similar procedure
