= Nanchang Yaohu Airport =

Nanchang Yaohu Airport 南昌瑶湖机场
- IATA: YHJ; ICAO: ZSYH

Summary
- Airport type: Aircraft testing, general aviation
- Location: Nanchang, Jiangxi, China
- Opened: 16 August 2018
- Coordinates: 28°42′3.5″N 116°6′27.7″E

Map
- Location of the airport in China

Runways
Direction	Length		Surface
Direction	m	ft	Surface
	3,600	11,811	Cement

Nanchang Yaohu Airport (Chinese: 南昌瑶湖机场) is an airport in Nanchang, Jiangxi, China, mainly used by Hongdu Aviation Industry Group Ltd., a major Chinese aircraft manufacturer, for test flights. It also serves as a general aviation airport.

== Facilities ==
Yaohu Airport is the second largest airport in Jiangxi, occupying an area of 60,000 square metres (650,000 sq ft). It has a runway that is 3,600 metres (11,800 ft) long and 60 metres (200 ft) wide, and more than 100 aircraft parking spaces. It may be used for test flights of the Comac C919 aircraft.

== History ==
Since its founding in 1951, Hongdu Aviation had used Nanchang Qingyunpu Airport for test flights. With the expansion of the city of Nanchang, Qingyunpu Airport became surrounded by the increasingly urban Qingyunpu District and restricted its development. On 23 December 2009, the Jiangxi provincial government reached an agreement with Aviation Industry Corporation of China, the parent company of Hongdu Aviation, to build Yaohu Airport in the Nanchang Aviation Industrial City as the replacement for Qingyunpu Airport. Construction officially began on 24 November 2016, and the airport was opened on 16 August 2018. The total cost was 1.65 billion yuan.
