= Spring Airlines =

Low-cost airline of China

Spring Airlines 春秋航空股份有限公司

- Spring Airlines Airbus A320
IATA	ICAO	Call sign
9C	CQH	AIR SPRING
- Founded: 26 May 2004; 22 years ago
- Operating bases: Lanzhou; Shanghai–Hongqiao; Shanghai–Pudong; Shijiazhuang
- Frequent-flyer program: Spring Pass
- Subsidiaries: Spring Japan (30%)
- Fleet size: 140
- Destinations: 103
- Parent company: Spring Airlines Ltd.
- Traded as: SSE: 601021
- Headquarters: Changning, Shanghai, China
- Key people: Zhang Xiuzhi (CEO)
- Website: www.ch.com

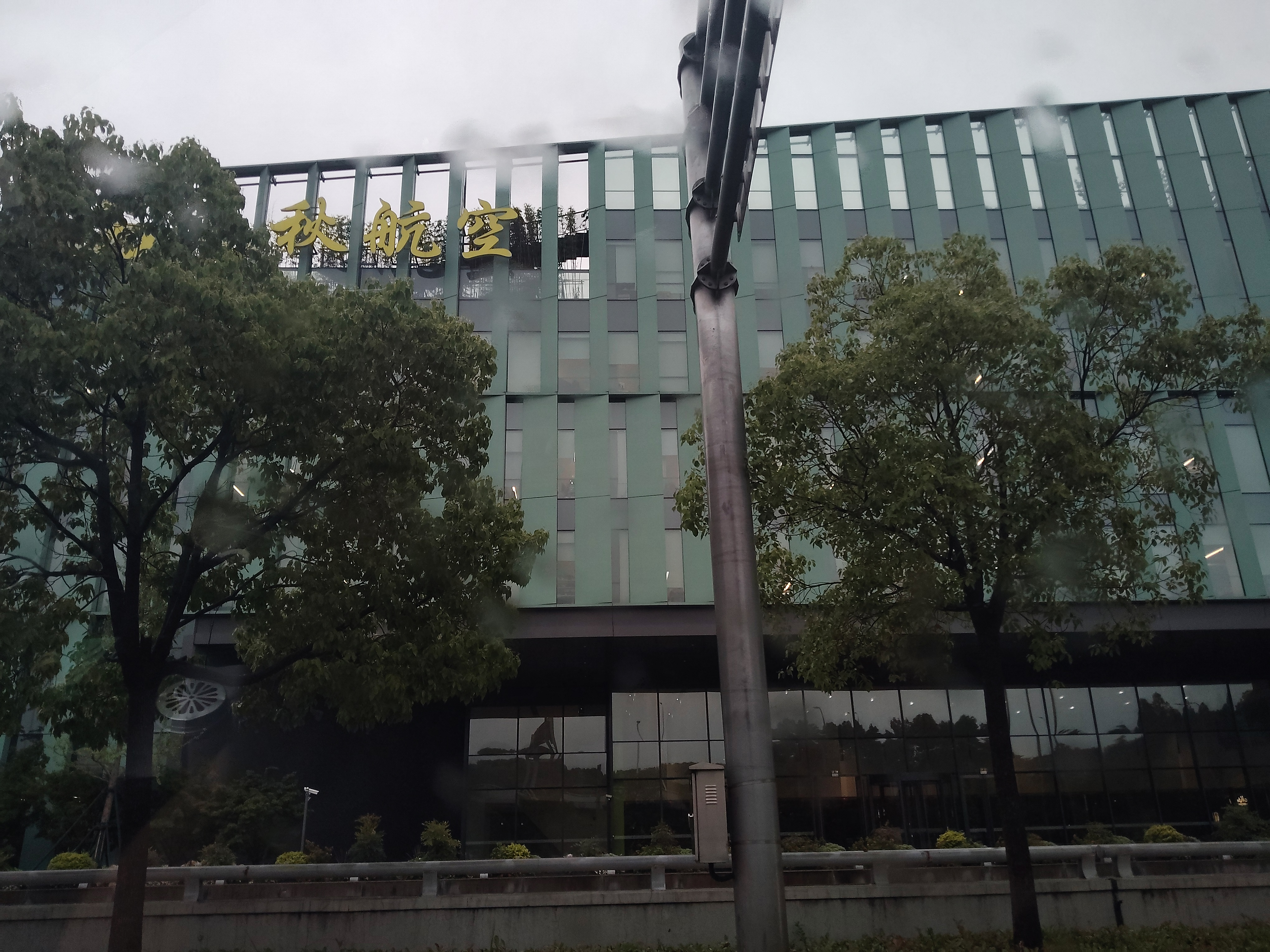
Spring Airlines new headquarters, located at Hongqiao Road, Shanghai

Spring Airlines (Note: Chinese: 春秋航空股份有限公司; pinyin: Chūnqiū Hángkōng Gǔfèn Yǒuxiàn Gōngsī; lit. 'Spring-Autumn Airline Limited Share/Stock Company') is a low-cost airline headquartered in Changning, Shanghai, China.

== History ==
The airline was given approval to be established on 26 May 2004. Its first aircraft, an Airbus A320 (formerly Lotus Air's), was delivered on 12 July 2005, at Shanghai Hongqiao International Airport. Spring Airlines started operations on 18 July 2005 and the first flight on that day was between Shanghai and Yantai. Daily flights to Guilin were also initiated.

To keep operating costs low, Spring sells tickets exclusively from its ch.com website (and some designated ticket offices), bypassing travel agents. Spring no longer offers complimentary on-board meals nor complimentary water; however, passengers may purchase meals and beverages on board. In December 2006, the airline offered a 1-yuan promotional price which caused trouble with government officials.

In late July 2009, Spring's plan to establish overseas routes was granted by the General Administration of Civil Aviation of the People's Republic of China, making it the first budget airline in China to explore the international market. The airline had plans to operate short-distance routes linking mainland Chinese cities to Hong Kong and Macau, as well as neighboring countries such as Japan, South Korea, Cambodia, Singapore, Vietnam and Thailand.

On July 29, 2010, Spring Airlines launched its first international route linking its home city Shanghai and Japan's Ibaraki Airport, about 80 kilometers northeast of Tokyo. 2 months later, on September 28, the airline successfully introduced its first flight from Shanghai to Hong Kong with almost full passengers on board. Spring's daily flights from Shanghai to Macau commenced on 8 April 2011 with further international destinations following in the second half of 2011.

Since January 2015, the company has been listed on the Shanghai Stock Exchange.

Spring Airlines operated an airline in Japan and is the first Chinese airline to do so.

== Corporate affairs and identity ==
=== Branding and livery ===
The Spring Airlines logo is designed with the initials "S" of Spring Airlines. It is composed of three overlapping and intersecting S's, which represents interaction, unity, and connection.
Spring Airlines' 3S logo stands for Safety, Smile, and Sincerity.
Spring Airlines' signature move of flying whenever you want is sliding the right palm toward the top of the left shoulder, symbolizing the ideal soaring into the sky.

History of Spring Airlines liveries

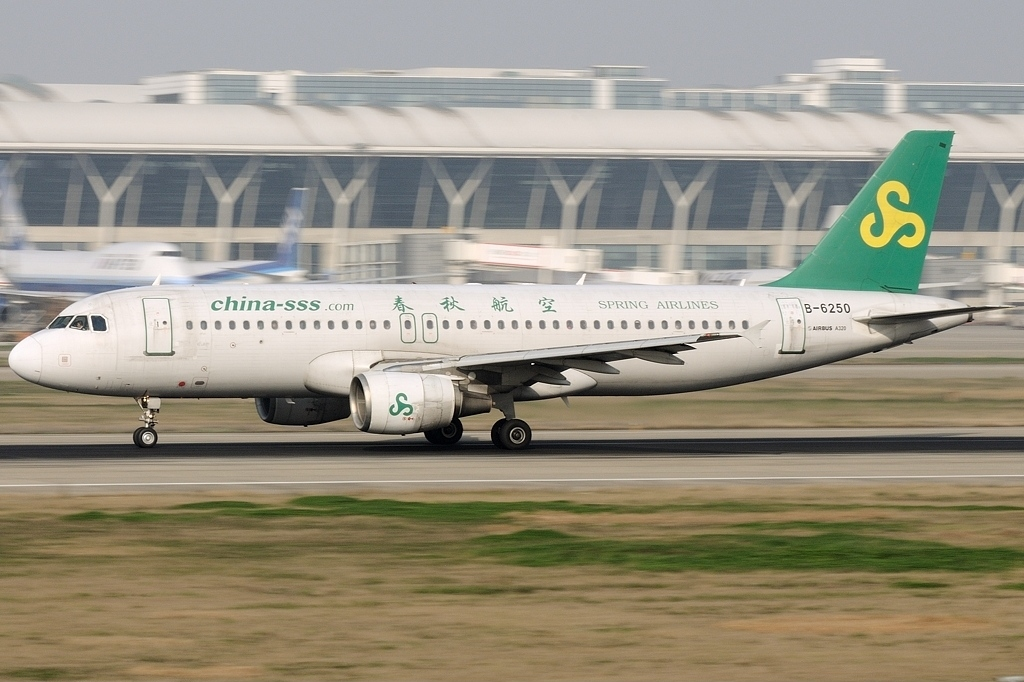
A Airbus A320 in the first generation livery at Shanghai Pudong International Airport.

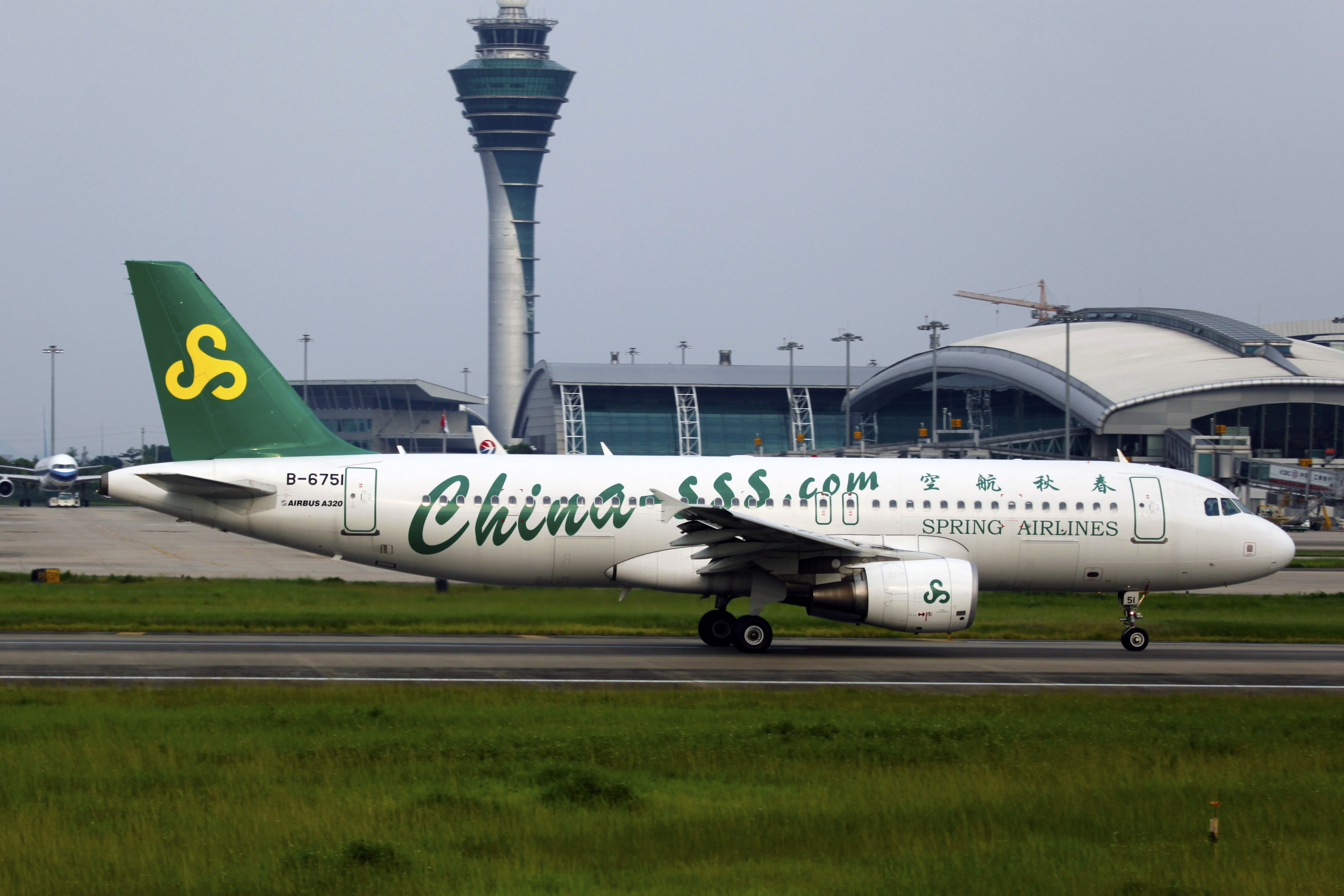
A Airbus A320-214 in the second generation livery at Guangzhou Baiyun International Airport.

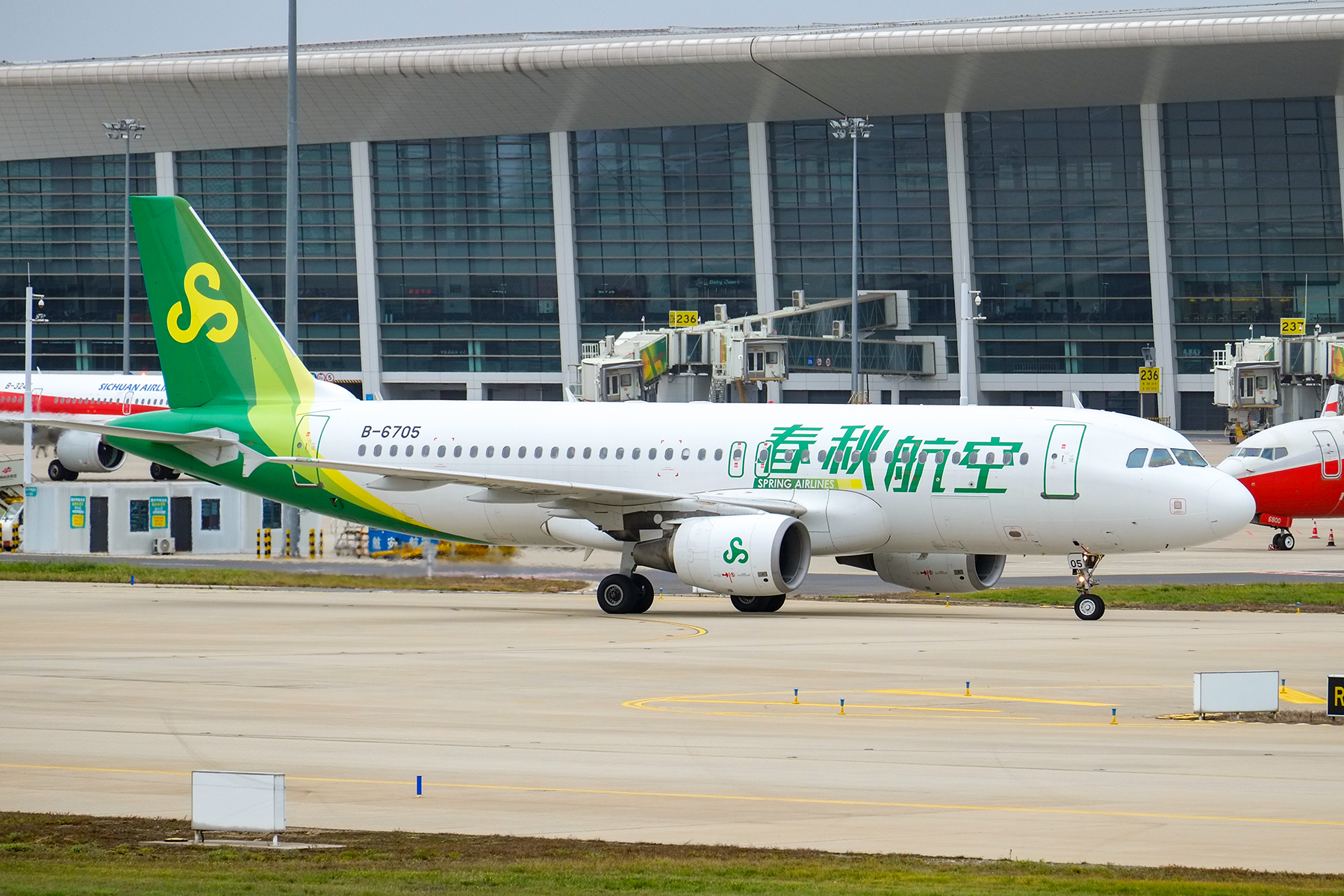
An Airbus A320-214 in the current 2021 livery at Zhengzhou Xinzheng International Airport.

== Destinations ==
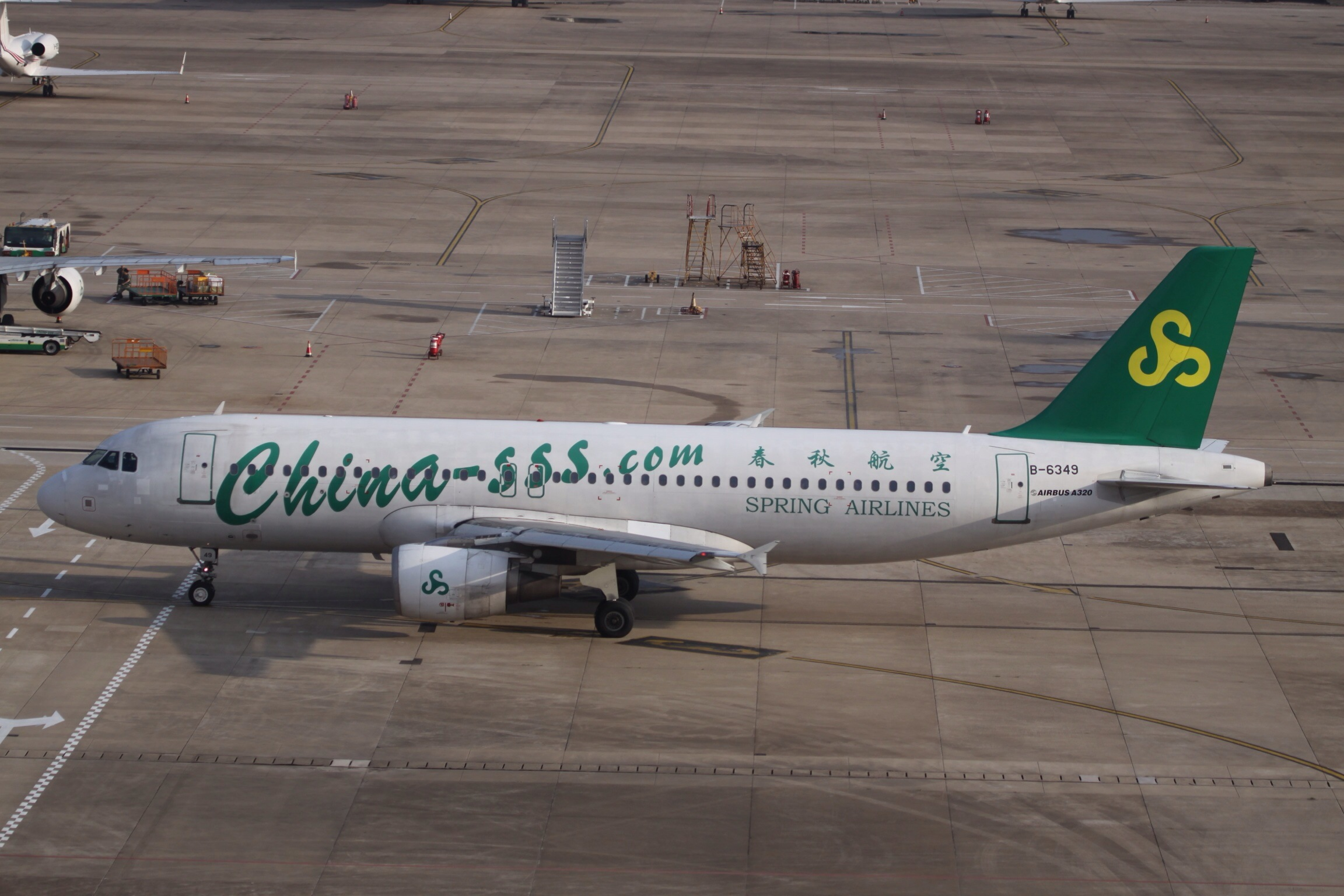
An Airbus A320-200 at Shanghai Hongqiao International Airport.

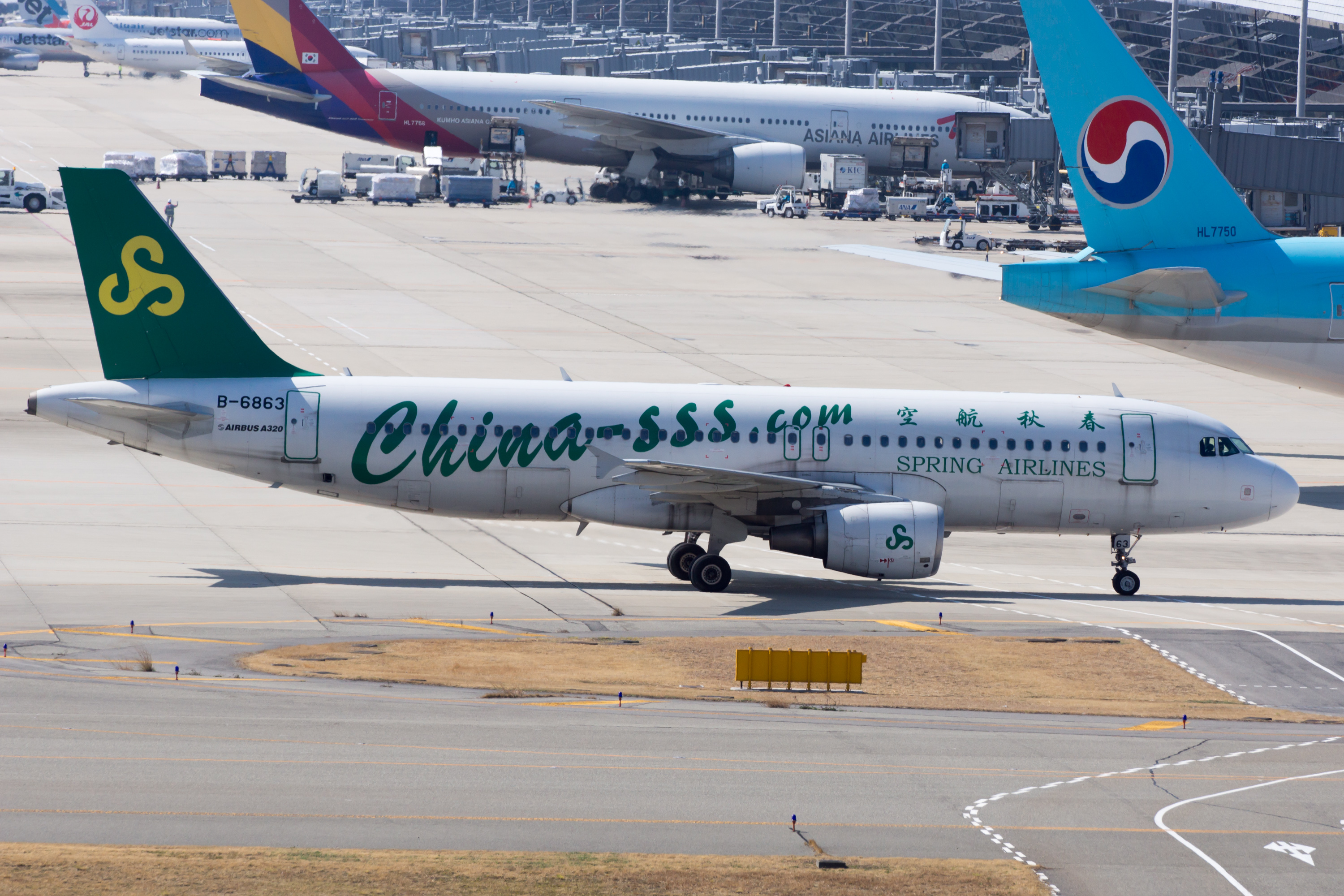
Spring Airlines Airbus A320-214 at Kansai Airport.

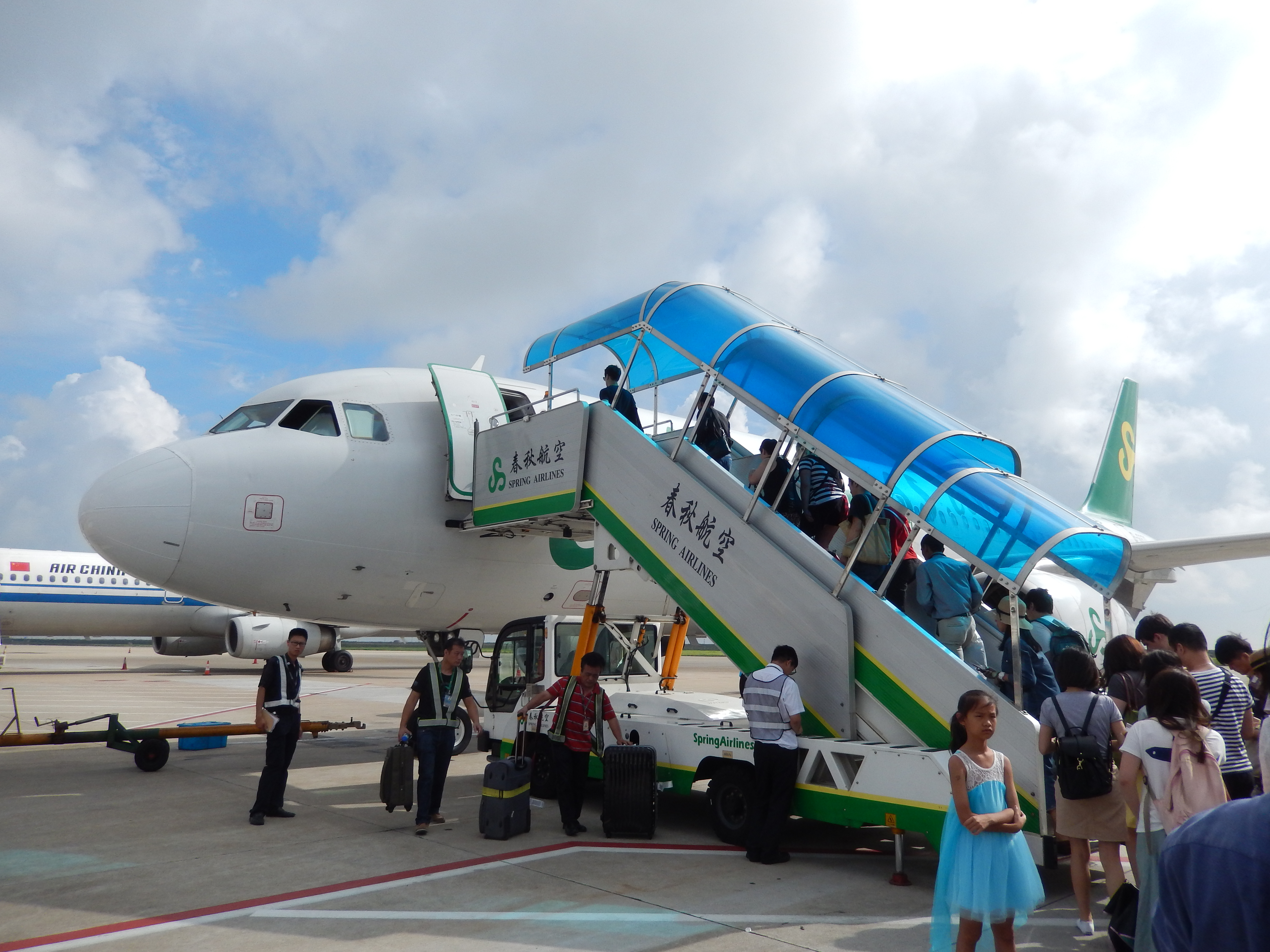
Passengers boarding a Spring Airlines aircraft via airstair.

As of April 2026, Spring Airlines serves destinations in East Asia and South East Asia.

=== Codeshare agreements ===
Spring Airlines has codeshare agreements with the following airlines:

- Eastar Jet

== Fleet ==
As of May 2026, Spring Airlines operates an all-Airbus A320 family fleet composed of the following aircraft:

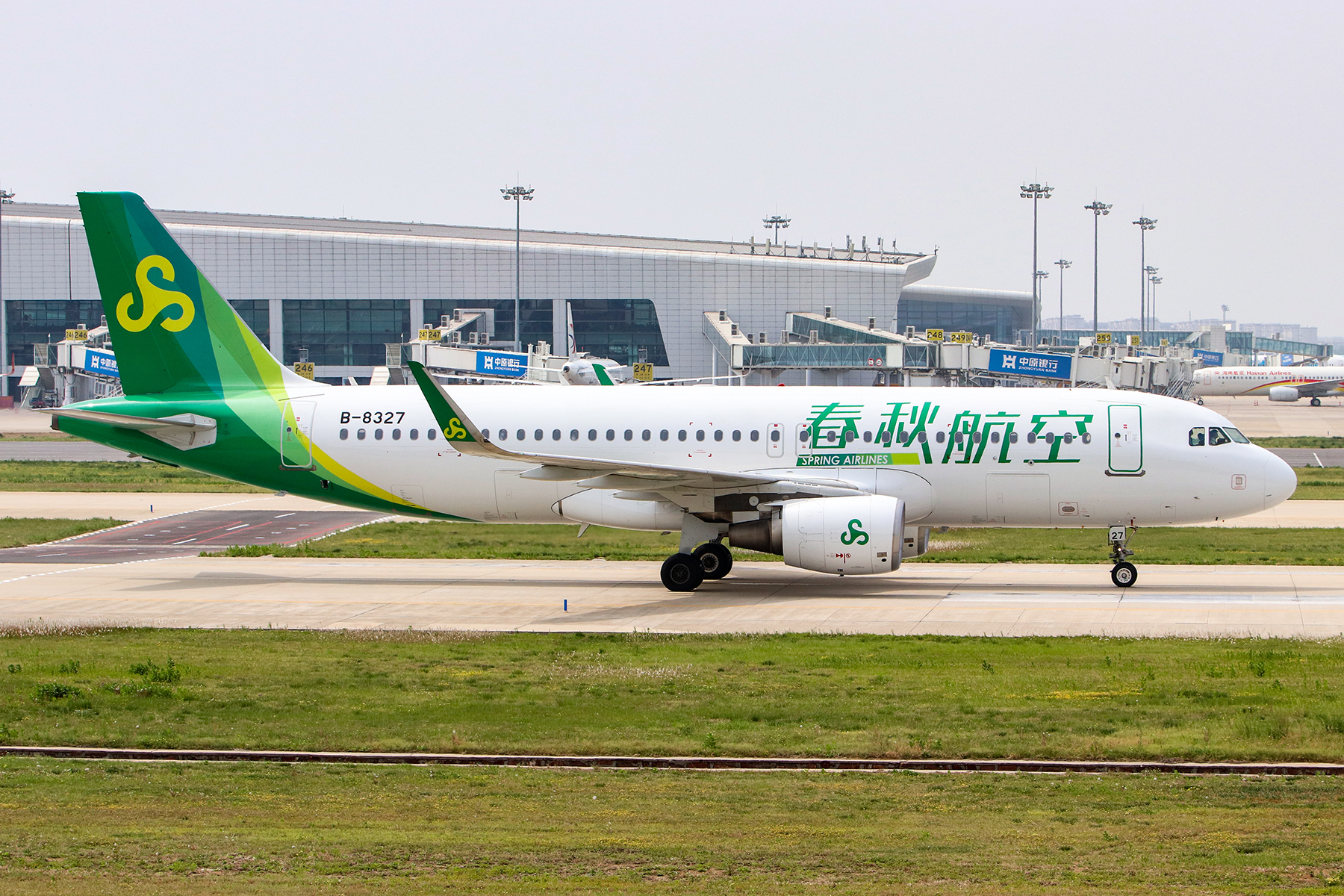
Spring Airlines Airbus A320-214.

Spring Airlines fleet
Aircraft	In service	Orders	Passengers	Notes
Airbus A320-200	75	—	174	
Airbus A320-200	75	—	180	
Airbus A320-200	75	—	186	
Airbus A320neo	48	32	186	
Airbus A321neo	12	10	240	
Total	135	42		

On 29 December 2025, Spring Airlines agreed to buy 30 A320neo aircraft; the jets are expected to be delivered in 2028–2032.
