= Nanchang Qingyunpu Airport =

Nanchang Qingyunpu Airport 南昌青云谱机场
- IATA: none; ICAO: none

Summary
- Airport type: Aircraft testing (former military)
- Location: Qingyunpu District, Nanchang, Jiangxi, China
- Opened: Spring 1935
- Elevation AMSL: 46 m / 151 ft
- Coordinates: 28°38′7″N 115°55′46″E

Map
- Location of the airport in China

Runways
Direction	Length		Surface
Direction	m	ft	Surface
	2,417	7,930	Cement

Nanchang Qingyunpu Airport (Chinese: 南昌青云谱机场), also known as Sanjiadian Airport (Chinese: 三家店机场), was an airport in Qingyunpu District of Nanchang, Jiangxi, China. Originally constructed for use by the Republic of China Air Force, it was the largest airport in China when opened in 1935. The airport was destroyed during the Second Sino-Japanese War and rebuilt afterwards. After 1949, it was mainly used for test flights by the aircraft manufacturer Hongdu Aviation Industry Group, until its replacement by Nanchang Yaohu Airport in 2018. After 2019, the airport ceased to exist and was redeveloped into a residential and commercial area.

== Location and facilities ==
The airport is located in Qingyunpu District of Nanchang, the capital of Jiangxi Province, China. It has a cement runway that is 2,417 metres (7,930 ft) long and 50 metres (160 ft) wide, capable of handling Boeing 737 and similar aircraft. Its elevation is 46 metres (151 ft) above sea level.

== History ==
=== Republic of China ===
Qingyunpu Airport, originally called Sanjiadian Airport, was built for Chiang Kai-shek's Encirclement Campaigns against the Chinese Soviet Republic, the rebel communist base in southern Jiangxi. Laoyingfang Airport was originally used for that purpose, but its proximity to the city center impeded frequent military operations by the 250 war planes based there.

In September 1933, Chiang ordered the construction of Sanjiadian Airport in Qingyunpu, then in the far outskirts of Nanchang, and mobilized 290,000 labourers from 83 counties of Jiangxi Province. Construction officially began on 1 August 1934, and the airport was opened in the spring of 1935. At the time it was the largest airport in China, proclaimed to be the "No. 1 airport in the Far East". It was then often referred to as the New Nanchang Airport.

In 1933, Chiang Kai-shek signed an agreement with Italian Prime Minister Benito Mussolini to establish a joint venture in China to manufacture airplanes. The company, called Sino-Italian National Aircraft Works (SINAW), was established in 1934 in Nanchang, with factories located at both Sanjiadian and Laoyingfang airports. It became the predecessor of Hongdu Aviation Industry Group, one of China's major aircraft manufacturers.

After the outbreak of the Second Sino-Japanese War in 1937, SINAW factories were severely damaged by Japanese aerial bombing. During a bombing of Qingyunpu on 22 December 1937, 9 Imperial Japanese Navy fighter aircraft led by Shiota Ryōhei flying out of recently captured Nanking and escorting 12 IJN bombers were intercepted by Chinese Air Force fighters; Shiota Ryōhei (潮田良平) himself was shot down and killed by Xu Baodi (徐葆畇), a pilot of the 5th Pursuit Group flying a Polikarpov I-15 acquired by the Chinese under the new Sino-Soviet Treaty to counter Imperial Japanese aggressions. The Soviet Union dispatched a volunteer air force to Qingyunpu Airport to help China fight the Japanese. Captain Anton Alekseyevich Gubenko and Major Liu Zhesheng among others all shot down Japanese bogeys during a major air battle over Nanchang on 26 June 1938. The airport was destroyed as a result of the prolonged fighting and attrition from 1937 into mid-1939, and was rebuilt after the end of the war in 1945.

=== People's Republic of China ===
After the establishment of the People's Republic of China in 1949, the airport was renovated and used for aircraft testing by Hongdu Machinery Factory (now Hongdu Aviation). From March 1981 to early 1982, when the runway of Nanchang Xiangtang Airport was being improved, Qingyunpu temporarily served as Nanchang's public airport for nine months.

With the expansion of the city of Nanchang, Qingyunpu Airport became surrounded by the increasingly urban Qingyunpu District and restricted its development. Several major thoroughfares are cut off by the airport, causing Qingyunpu to be known as the most congested district of Nanchang. On 23 December 2009, the Jiangxi provincial government reached an agreement with Aviation Industry Corporation of China, the parent company of Hongdu Aviation, to build the new Yaohu Airport in the Nanchang Aviation Industrial City to replace Qingyunpu Airport. Construction for Yaohu Airport began in November 2016, and it was opened on 16 August 2018. Qingyunpu Airport is expected to close by the end of 2018.
