= Qingyunpu, Nanchang =

Qingyunpu 青云谱区
- District
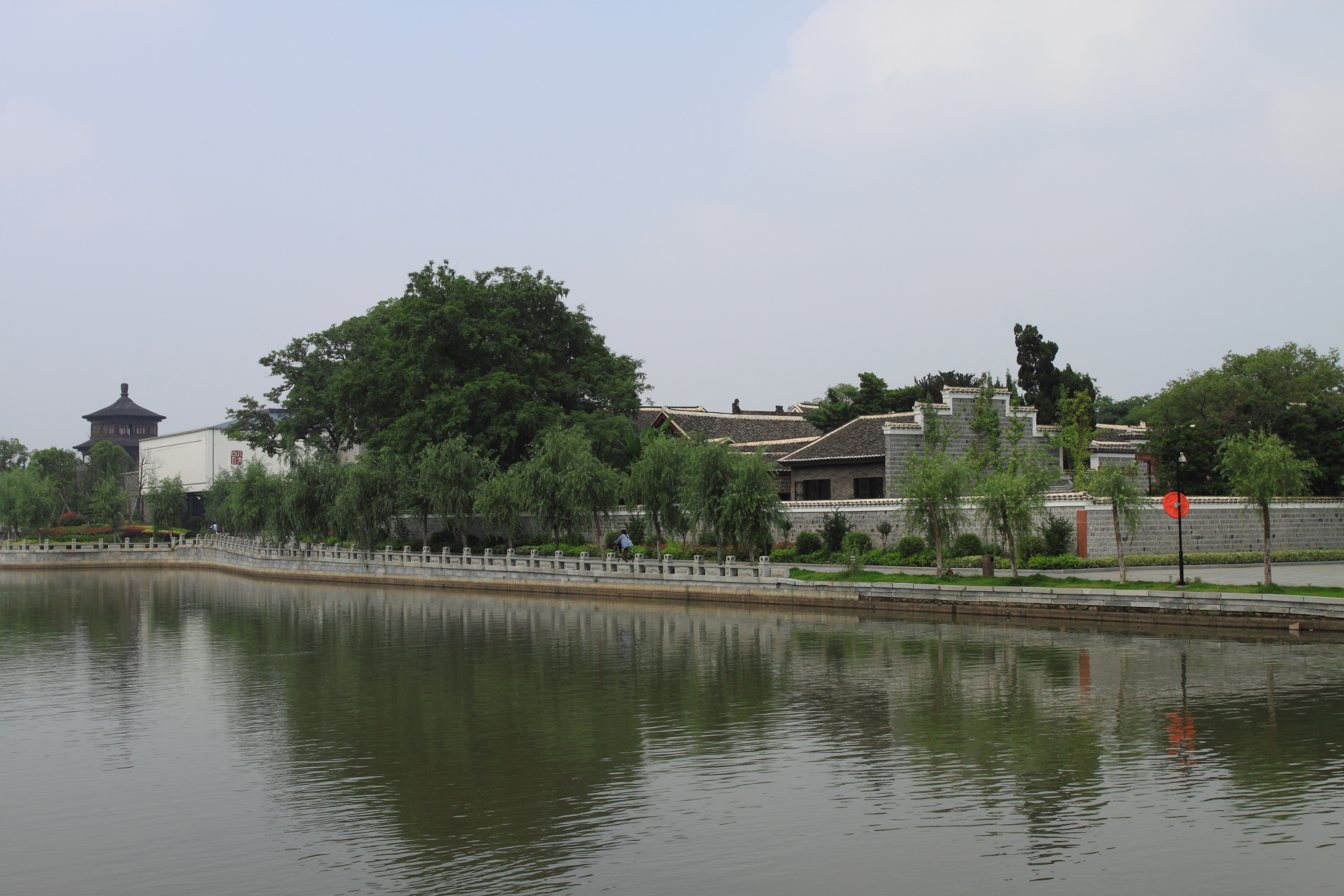
- Interactive map of Qingyunpu
- Coordinates: 28°37′16″N 115°55′33″E
- Country: People's Republic of China
- Province: Jiangxi
- Prefecture-level city: Nanchang

Area
  - Total: 43.2 km^{2} (16.7 sq mi)

Population (2018)
  - Total: 342,800
  - Density: 7,940/km^{2} (20,600/sq mi)
- Time zone: UTC+8 (China Standard)
- Postal code: 330001

Qingyunpu District (simplified Chinese: 青云谱区; traditional Chinese: 青雲譜區; pinyin: Qīngyúnpǔ Qū), is one of 6 urban districts of the prefecture-level city of Nanchang, the capital of Jiangxi Province, China. It covers over 40 km^{2} (15 sq mi) and as of 2004 had a population of 240,000. It is the location of Nanchang Qingyunpu Airport.

== Administrative divisions ==
Qingyunpu District is divided into 5 subdistricts and 1 town:

5 subdistricts

- Sanjiadian (三家店街道)
- Hongdu (洪都街道)
- Jingshan (京山街道)
- Xujiafang (徐家坊街道)
- Daishan (岱山街道)

1 town

- Qingyunpu (青云谱镇)
