= Xiangtang, Jiangxi =

Xiangtang 向塘镇
- Town
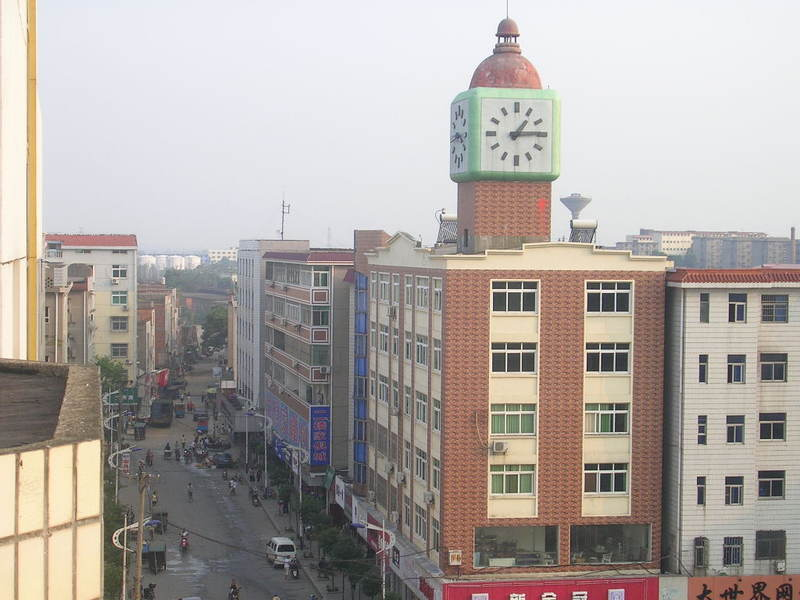
- Interactive map of Xiangtang
- Coordinates: 28°25′58″N 115°58′10″E
- Country: People's Republic of China
- Province: Jiangxi
- Prefecture-level city: Nanchang
- County: Nanchang

Area
  - Total: 146 km^{2} (56 sq mi)
- Elevation: 31 m (102 ft)

Population (2010)
  - Total: 150,000
  - Density: 1,000/km^{2} (2,700/sq mi)
- Time zone: UTC+8 (China Standard)
- Postal code: 330201
- Area code: 0791

Xiangtang (Chinese: 向塘; pinyin: xiàngtáng; lit. 'face river bank'; Mandarin pronunciation: [ɕjɑ̃tʰɑ̃]) is a town located to the south of Nanchang, the capital of China's Jiangxi province, under the administration of Nanchang County It is the most populous town in the province with the population more than 150,000 as of the 2010 census. The town was established from a village, which is still remaining near the present center of the town, during the Qing Dynasty. The village experienced fast growth when the main part of the Zhejiang–Jiangxi Railway was completed in 1935. Nowadays, Xiangtang has two main rail stations: Xiangtang West Station as the second largest freight yard in China and Xiangtang Station as a level-1 passenger station nationwide. It is the location of Nanchang Xiangtang Airport, Nanchang's main civil airport (dual-use military/civil) before Nanchang Changbei International Airport went into operation on September 10, 1999.

There are 33 government-owned institutions and about 4000 researchers and technicians working here. In 1999, Xiangtang became a provincial level development zone and boosted the medical, chemical, clothing, material industry and education.

== Geography ==
It is 25 kilometres (16 mi) from the city proper of Nanchang. The elevation of Xiangtang is 27m above the sea. Gan River, the main river in the province and a tributary of Yangtze River, is just 10 km (6.2 mi) away. The area of the town is 146 km^{2} (56 sq mi).

== History ==
The earliest remnants of human habitation in Xiangtang are found in the Majin Remnants near the village of Shatan. Stone tools from the remnants date to 50,000 to 20,000 years ago. Xiangtang area as a part of Nanchang was founded in 201 BC during the early Han dynasty. The village which the town was named after was settled in Qing Dynasty. In 1935, a rail station was built near Xiangtang village and since then the present town was formed.

Chairman Mao at Xiangtang

== Demographics ==
Xiangtang has an approximate population of 150,000 people and the central area consists of 80,000 people. Majority of residents belong to the Han Chinese. Other people from ethnic minorities such as Uyghur are also living and doing business there. Xiangtang also consists of a large population of students and military forces from other places. Though most of them are expected to leave after 3 or 4 years, they are still considered as residents and play an important role in the social and economic aspects. Moreover, they are a significant part of the young people in the town and some of them even stay when they graduate or are demobilized.

== Administration ==
Xiangtang is divided into 10 resident committees and 19 villages. The 10 resident committees are: Zhenjie, Dongfeng rd, Tongzhan rd, Jiefang rd, W.Minzhu rd, E.Minzhu rd, Tuanjie rd, Tielu Xincun, Xinjie, and Shucai. The 19 villages are Tangsu, Huangshan, Hetou, Huangtang, Liangxi, Huangxi, Xiluo, Jiaxi, Xincun, Gufang, Gaotian, Jianxia, Hehuoqi, Dingfang, Xiangtang, Nandian, Jingshan, Shatan, and Shanbei.

== Culture ==
Many communities have their own festivals to thank the guard and bless of their ancestors or pray for good fortune such as Qiqiao festival in Gong's and Fu's communities in Gaotian village, summer festival in Gong's community in Linan, and September 1 festival in Fu's community in Shuxi. The most renowned one is the Denggun festival (竖灯棍哩) in Deng's community in Huangtang village. They celebrate the day of the settlement on Jan 12th of Chinese lunar calendar each year. The festival has more than 220 years history and can be dated to Qianlong era in Qing Dynasty. On that day, all people from Deng's family will go back to their ancestors' houses and erect a 36m long wooden rod using fish forks in the center of the village. On the top of the rod, a lantern will be hang up. The big image of family tree will be displayed and the celebration will last for three days. It becomes a town-wide festival and there are a lot of people from Nanchang attending to it.

Pottery is a local artwork in Nandian village. People make fine pottery by hand and the skills are inherited through generations. Another local product is tea can in Jingshan village.

Every two years a peasants' sport games is held and a town-wide sport games is held every four years. Military forces and civilians have joint parties on the Army's day and spring festival. The traditional entertainments such as lunar comedy, dragon lantern, stilts, myth cosplay are performed in public.

=== Local special food ===
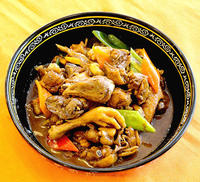
Xiangtang Organic Chicken Soup

- Dingfang Red-cooked Chicken (丁坊袁家的红烧土鸡)
- Dingfang Rice Wine (丁坊的红酒)
- Xia'an Red-cooked Grey Mullets (下岸周家的红烧乌鱼)
- Jingshan Bean-Rice Cakes and Fried Rice Pancakes (荆山的尚谌店的豆沫米茹,没炸米果)
- Xincun Rice Noddles (新村沥南的米粉)
- Gufang Noddles (辜坊的挂面)
- Xiangtang Organic Chicken Soup (向塘土鸡)
- Nandian Lotus Roots (南店峰东邓家的莲藕)

=== Historical sites ===
- Liangxi Qianfang Remnants (梁西前坊)
- Shatan Majin Remnants (沙潭马井)
- Tianxian Temple WWII Massacre Memorial (天仙庙遗址)
- Hewan Well WWII Massacre Memorial (河湾井遗址)

=== Accent ===
Nanchang dialect is the general name of the regional speech in Nanchang and its nearby area. It is also an example of Gan, which is spoken in most part of Jiangxi and some parts of surrounding provinces. Though it is located near the city of Nanchang, the Xiangtang area has a slightly different speech pattern called the Xiangtang Tuhua(向塘土话). The different pattern was formed because in the old days people usually didn't move out their own villages unless women married to other people in neighbor villages.

The traditional Xiangtang Tuhua has five phonemic tones like Nanchang dialect, however, it emphasizes more often and heavier on the words. Because of this, Xiangtang Tuhua sounds louder and harder. There are also a number of words and expressions only found in Xiangtang Tuhua.

== Transportation ==
Xiangtang is served by Nanchang Railways, which uses Xiangtang Station as the passenger station and Xiangtang West station as the freight station. The railways provide connection to almost all major cities in the country. Beijing-Kowloon Railway, Shanghai-Kunming Railway and Xiangtang-Putian Railway run across the town.

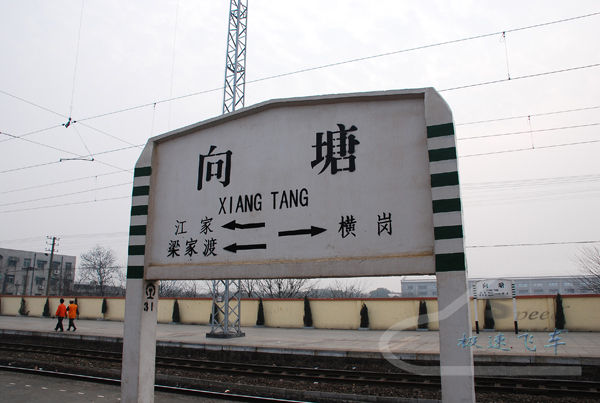
Xiangtang Station

Xiangtang's public bus lines 236 and 239 to Nanchang are the main bus routes. It takes about 2 hours on regular route or less than 40 minutes using fast route to travel between Xiangtang and Nanchang.

Three national routes: G316, G320, G105 and Wen-hou highway pass by Xiangtang.

Nanchang Xiangtang Airport, now a military airport, is located in Xiangtang. It formerly served as Nanchang's main civil airport until all commercial flights were moved to Nanchang Changbei International Airport in 1999.

== Economy ==
Xiangtang Provincial level development zone

In 1999, Xiangtang became a provincial level development zone. Agricultural production in Xiangtang is traditional part of its economy. The yield of grain was 57,776 tons in 2004. The yield of vegetable in 2004 is 87,570 tons. The Huiren Medical Company has its headquarters and one of the factories in Xiangtang with more than 1000 local employees. Nike has a clothing factory near the Jiangxi Clothing Institute. Town government has introduced 32 projects and 2.63 billion RMB fund to improve the industrial structure. Many of its industry revolves around clothing, manufacturing, metallurgy, textile, chemical engineering, traditional Chinese medicine, pharmaceuticals and others. In 2007, Xiangtang together with other towns in Nanchang County was awarded "National top 100 Counties".The GDP of Xiangtang in 2008 was 7.2 billion RMB (1.06 billion USD). The total financial revenue was 100 million RMB. Now Xiangtang is growing as one of the main freight hubs in Jiangxi province while taking advantage of the convenience of transportation.

== Education ==
- Jiangxi Clothing Institute
- Jiangxi Technology Institute
- Rail Nursing School
