= Nanchang Xiangtang Airport =

Military airport in Nanchang, Jiangxi, China

Nanchang Xiangtang Airport 南昌向塘机场
- IATA: KHN; ICAO: none

Summary
- Airport type: Military
- Owner: People's Liberation Army
- Operator: People's Liberation Army Air Force
- Serves: Nanchang
- Location: Xiangtang, Jiangxi, China
- Opened: 1 January 1957 (commercial)
- Passenger services ceased: 10 September 1999
- Built: 1952 (military)
- Coordinates: 28°25′17″N 115°55′24″E

Map
- Location of airport in China

Runways
Direction	Length		Surface
Direction	m	ft	Surface
	2,500	8,202	Paved

Nanchang Xiangtang Airport (or Xiangtang Air Base) is a People's Liberation Army Air Force Base in Xiangtang in East China's Jiangxi province. It served as the city's civilian airport from 1 January 1957 until 10 September 1999, when all commercial flights were transferred to the newly built Nanchang Changbei International Airport.

== Location and facilities ==
Nanchang Xiangtang Airport is located in the town of Xiangtang, 29 kilometres (18 mi) south of central Nanchang and 4 kilometres (2.5 mi) west of Xiangtang railway station. It occupies an area of 162,000 square metres (1,740,000 sq ft), and has a paved runway measuring 2,500 metres (8,200 ft) by 62 metres (203 ft).

== History ==
Xiangtang Air Base was built in 1952 by the People's Liberation Army Air Force. In August 1956, the Chinese government decided to convert the airbase into a dual-use military and civil airport. On 1 January 1957, Nanchang's first civil flight in the People's Republic of China era took off at Xiangtang, bound for Ganzhou. In Xiangtang's first full year of operation, it served a total of 102 passengers, which increased to 35,709 in 1980.

From March 1981 to early 1982, Xiangtang Airport's runway was strengthened and thickened, and Qingyunpu Airport temporarily served as Nanchang's main airport for nine months.

During the reform and opening era, air travel boomed and Xiangtang's passenger volume grew rapidly. It handled more than 100,000 passengers in 1989, and more than 800,000 in both 1995 and 1996. Although expanded twice, Xiangtang Airport was unable to accommodate the explosive growth in traffic.

In 1996, construction began for the Nanchang Changbei Airport to replace Xiangtang. When Changbei Airport was opened on 10 September 1999, all commercial flights were transferred to the new airport and Xiangtang reverted to sole military use. The airport currently hosts the 40th Air Brigade, equipped with approximately 70 J-16 fighters.
