= List of defunct airlines of China =

This is a list of defunct airlines of China.

Airline	Image	IATA	ICAO	Callsign	Commenced operations	Ceased operations	Notes
AirAsia China					2017	2018	Never launched
Air Great Wall		G8	CGW	GREAT WALL	1992	2001	Formed by CAAC Flying College. 55% stake acquired in 2000 by China Eastern Airlines, and reorganized in 2001 as the Ningbo branch of China Eastern Airlines. Merged into China Eastern Airlines.
Beijing-Han Airlines					1922	1922	Founded by Cao Kun with a single Handley Page aircraft which fatally crashed 3 days after launch.
CAAC		CA	CCA	CAAC	1952	1991	Airline division of the Civil Aviation Administration of China; split into six airlines
CDI Cargo Airlines		GJ	CDC	CDI Cargo	2011	2013	Rebranded as Loong Air
China Air Cargo			CYN		1988	1993	Formed by CAAC Flying College. Integrated into Air China.
China Eastern Airlines Cargo					2002	2004	Was known as China Cargo Airlines before 2002, reverted to the original name
China General Aviation		GP	CTH	TONGHANG	1987	1998	Acquired by China Eastern Airlines
China National Aviation Corporation (CNAC)					1925	1952	Nationalized in 1949; merged into the People's Aviation Company of China in 1952
China Northern Airlines		CJ	CBF	CHINA NORTHERN	1990	2004	Merged into China Southern Airlines
China Eastern Yunnan Airlines					2011	2026	Merged into China Eastern Airlines.
China Northwest Airlines		WH	CNW	CHINA NORTHWEST	1989	2003	Merged with China Yunnan Airlines into China Eastern Airlines
China Southwest Airlines		SZ	CXN	CHINA SOUTHWEST	1987	2002	Merged into Air China
China Xinhua Airlines		XW	CXH	XINHUA	1992	2007	Merged with Chang An Airlines and Shanxi Airlines to form Grand China Air
China Xinjiang Airlines		XO	CXJ	XINJIANG	1985	2003	Absorbed into China Southern Airlines
China Yunnan Airlines		3Q	CYH	YUNNAN	1992	2003	Merged with China Northwest Airlines into China Eastern Airlines
Deer Jet		DF	DER	Jinlu Service Airlines	1995	2006	Renamed/merged to Deer Air
Donghai Airlines Cargo		J5	EPA	DONGHAI AIR	2006	2016	
East Pacific Airlines				EPA Airways	2004	2006	Rebranded as Donghai Airlines
East Star Airlines		8C	DXH	EAST STAR	2005	2009	Went bankrupt
Eurasia Aviation Corporation					1925	1943	Sino-German joint airline
Fujian Airlines		IV	CFJ		1993	1994	Merged into XiamenAir
Grandstar Cargo		GD	GSC	GRANDSTAR CARGO	2008	2012	Merged into Uni-Top Airlines
Great Wall Airlines		IJ	GWL	GREAT WALL	2006	2011	Merged with Shanghai Airlines Cargo into China Cargo Airlines
Guizhou Airlines		G4	CGH	GUIZHOU	1991	1998	Merged into China Southern Airlines
Hamiata (Sino-Soviet Aviation Corporation)					1939	1950	Sino-Soviet joint airline, taken over by SKOGA
Henan Airlines		VD	KPA	KUN PENG	2009	2010	Bankruptcy and ceased after the Henan Airlines Flight 8387 incident
Jade Cargo International		JI	JAE	JADE CARGO	2006	2011	Bankruptcy
Joy Air		JR	JOY	JOY AIR	2009	2025	Operational and financial difficulties.
Kunpeng Airlines		VD	KPA	KUNPENG AIR	2007	2009	Rebranded as Henan Airlines
Manchuria Aviation Company		RH			1931	1945	Dissolved after the fall of Manchukuo
Nanjing Airlines		3W	CNJ		1988	2003	Merged into parent company China Eastern Airlines
Northeast Airlines		NS	DBH	DONGBEI AIR	2007	2010	Rebranded as Hebei Airlines
OTT Airlines		JF	OTT	OTT AIRLINES	2020	2024	Merged into parent company China Eastern Airlines
Shanghai Airlines Cargo		F4	SHQ	SHANGHAI CARGO	2006	2011	Merged with Great Wall Airlines into China Cargo Airlines
Shanxi Airlines		8C	CXI	SHANXI	1988	2007	Merged with Chang An Airlines and China Xinhua Airlines to form Grand China Air
SKOGA				СКОГА	1950	1954	Sino-Soviet joint airline; came under Chinese control and replaced by CAAC
Swan Airlines					1991	1996	Taken over by China Northern Airlines
United Eagle Airlines (UEAir)		EU	UEA	UNITED EAGLE	2005	2010	Rebranded as Chengdu Airlines
Uni-Top Airlines		UW	UTP	UNITOP	2009	2019	Bankruptcy
Wuhan Airlines		WU	CWU	WUHAN AIR	1986	2002	Merged into China Eastern Airlines
Yangtze River Express		Y8	YZR	YANGTZE RIVER	2003	2017	Rebranded as Suparna Airlines
Ying'an Airlines		YI	AYE	AIR YING AN	2005	2015	Air Carrier Operating Certificate Revoked
Zhejiang Airlines			CJG	ZHEJIANG	1986	2004	Absorbed into Air China
Zhongyuan Airlines		Z2	CYN	ZHONGYUAN	1986	2000	Acquired by China Southern Airlines

== See also ==
- List of airlines of China
- List of airports in China
- List of defunct airlines of Asia
