= Cai Jianjiang =

Chinese politician

- 蔡剑江

Director of the Office of the Central Air Traffic Management Committee
- Incumbent
- Assumed office October 2020
- Preceded by: New title

Personal details
- Born: 1963 (age 62–63) Wuxi, Jiangsu, China
- Party: Chinese Communist Party
- Education: Civil Aviation University of China

Chinese name
- Simplified Chinese: 蔡剑江
- Traditional Chinese: 蔡劍江
Transcriptions
Standard Mandarin
- Hanyu Pinyin: Cài Jiànjiāng

Cai Jianjiang (Chinese: 蔡剑江; born 1963) is a Chinese executive and politician who is the current director of the Office of the Central Air Traffic Management Commission. Previously he served as chairman and party branch secretary of China National Aviation Holding.

He was an alternate of the 19th Central Committee of the Chinese Communist Party and is a member of the 20th Central Committee of the Chinese Communist Party.

== Biography ==
Cai was born in Wuxi, Jiangsu, in 1963. He attended Wuxi Meicun High School. After resuming the college entrance examination, in 1979, he was accepted to the Civil Aviation University of China, where he double majored in navigation control and English language and literature. After graduating in 1983, he stayed at the university and taught there.

Cai worked in Shenzhen Airlines before being assigned to Air China in 2001, and eventually becoming its party secretary in September 2004 and chairman in February 2007. He concurrently served as chairman of Shenzhen Airlines Co., Ltd. since April 2010.

He was promoted to general manager of China National Aviation Holding in January 2014. In December 2016, he was promoted again to become chairman and party branch secretary.

In October 2020, he was appointed director of the Office of the Central Air Traffic Management Committee, a position at ministerial level.

Business positions
| Preceded by Wang Changshun | General Manager of China National Aviation Holding; 2014–2016 | Succeeded by Song Zhiyong (宋志勇) |
| New title | Chairman of China National Aviation Holding; 2016–2020 | Succeeded by Song Zhiyong (宋志勇) |
Party political offices
| Preceded by Song Zhiyong (宋志勇) | Party Branch Secretary of China National Aviation Holding; 2016–2020 | Succeeded by Song Zhiyong (宋志勇) |
Government offices
| New title | Director of the Office of the Central Air Traffic Management Committee; 2020– | Incumbent |
