= Greater Bay =

Greater Bay may refer to:

- Guangdong–Hong Kong–Macao Greater Bay Area, a region of southern China
- Greater Bay Airlines, an airline based in Hong Kong
