= OTT Airlines =

Chinese regional airline (2020–2024)

One Two Three Airlines 一二三航空公司 Yī'èrsān Hángkōng Gōngsī

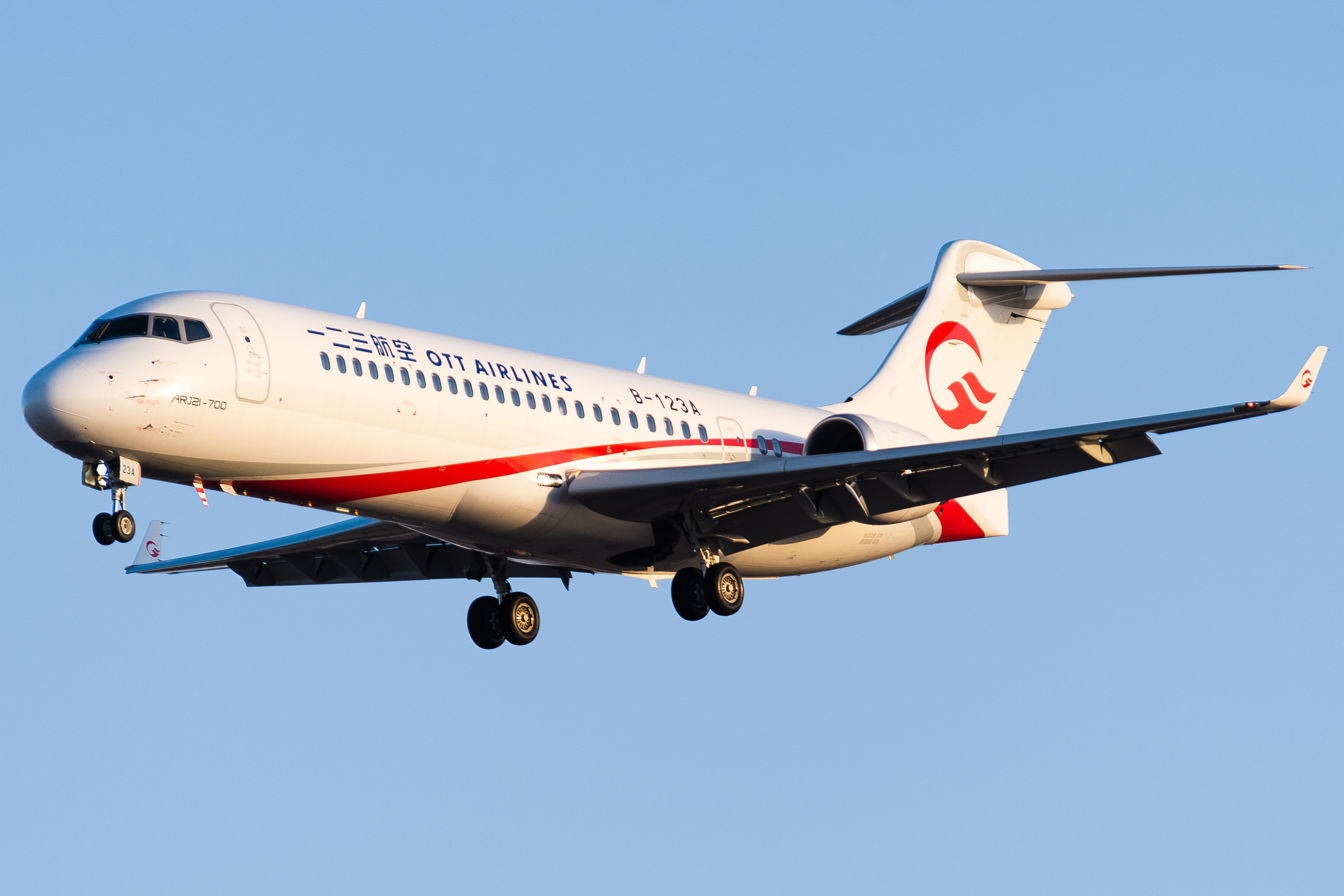
IATA	ICAO	Call sign
JF	OTT	OTT AIRLINES
- Founded: 26 February 2020
- Commenced operations: 28 December 2020
- Ceased operations: 22 September 2024 (re-integrated into China Eastern Airlines)
- Hubs: Shanghai Hongqiao International Airport
- Fleet size: 26
- Parent company: China Eastern Airlines
- Headquarters: Changning, Shanghai

One Two Three Airlines (Chinese: 一二三航空公司; pinyin: Yī'èrsān Hángkōng Gōngsī), branded as OTT Airlines, was a Chinese airline, headquartered in Shanghai and focused on the Yangtze Delta region. It was launched as a subsidiary of China Eastern Airlines in February 2020 and was merged into China Eastern Airlines in September 2024.

== Name ==
The name "One Two Three Airlines" refers to Chinese philosopher Laozi's three principles of Daoism.

== History ==
On 26 February 2020, China Eastern Airlines launched OTT Airlines as a subsidiary to operate Chinese-domestically produced aircraft, in addition to its existing business jet operations. It was originally scheduled to be the first airline to operate the COMAC C919, beginning in 2022.

In June 2020, OTT Airlines received the delivery of their first three COMAC ARJ21s. In December 2020, the Civil Aviation Administration of China (CAAC) announced that it had completed a preliminary review of the airline's application for an operating license.

The airline operated its maiden flight on 28 December 2020, a flight from Shanghai Hongqiao International Airport to Beijing Capital International Airport. Its launch plans included routes to Nanchang, Hefei, and Wenzhou starting in the first three months of 2021.

On 31 August 2024, China Eastern Airlines announced that it will absorb OTT Airlines, integrate it into parent mainline operations. The operation merge effected on September 22, 2024, marking the dissolution of the airline.

== Corporate affairs ==
OTT Airlines was a subsidiary of China Eastern Airlines. OTT Airlines was headquartered in Shanghai.

== Fleet ==
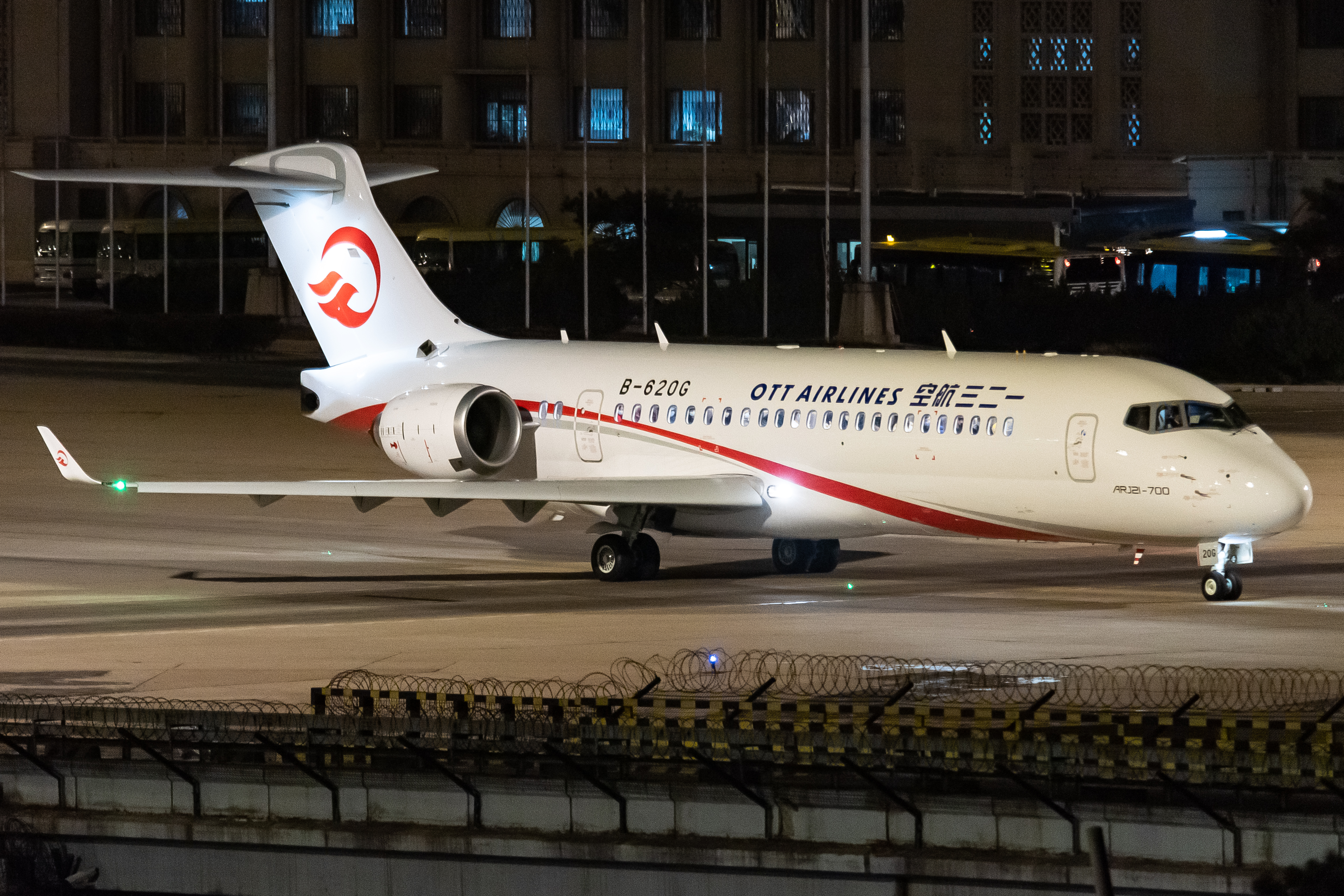
A Comac ARJ21 of OTT Airlines at Beijing Capital International Airport in 2020

OTT Airlines mainly operated the Chinese-made Comac ARJ21. It began operations with three ARJ21s, with 6 additional ARJ21s delivered in 2021. A total of 35 ARJ21s were scheduled to be delivered between 2021 and 2025.

OTT Airlines fleet in July 2024
Aircraft	In service	Orders	Passengers		Notes
Aircraft	In service	Orders	E	Total	Notes
Comac ARJ21-700	24	11	90	90	
Embraer Legacy 650	2	—	VIP		
Total	26	11			

== See also ==
- List of defunct airlines of China
