= Liu Shaoyong =

- 刘绍勇
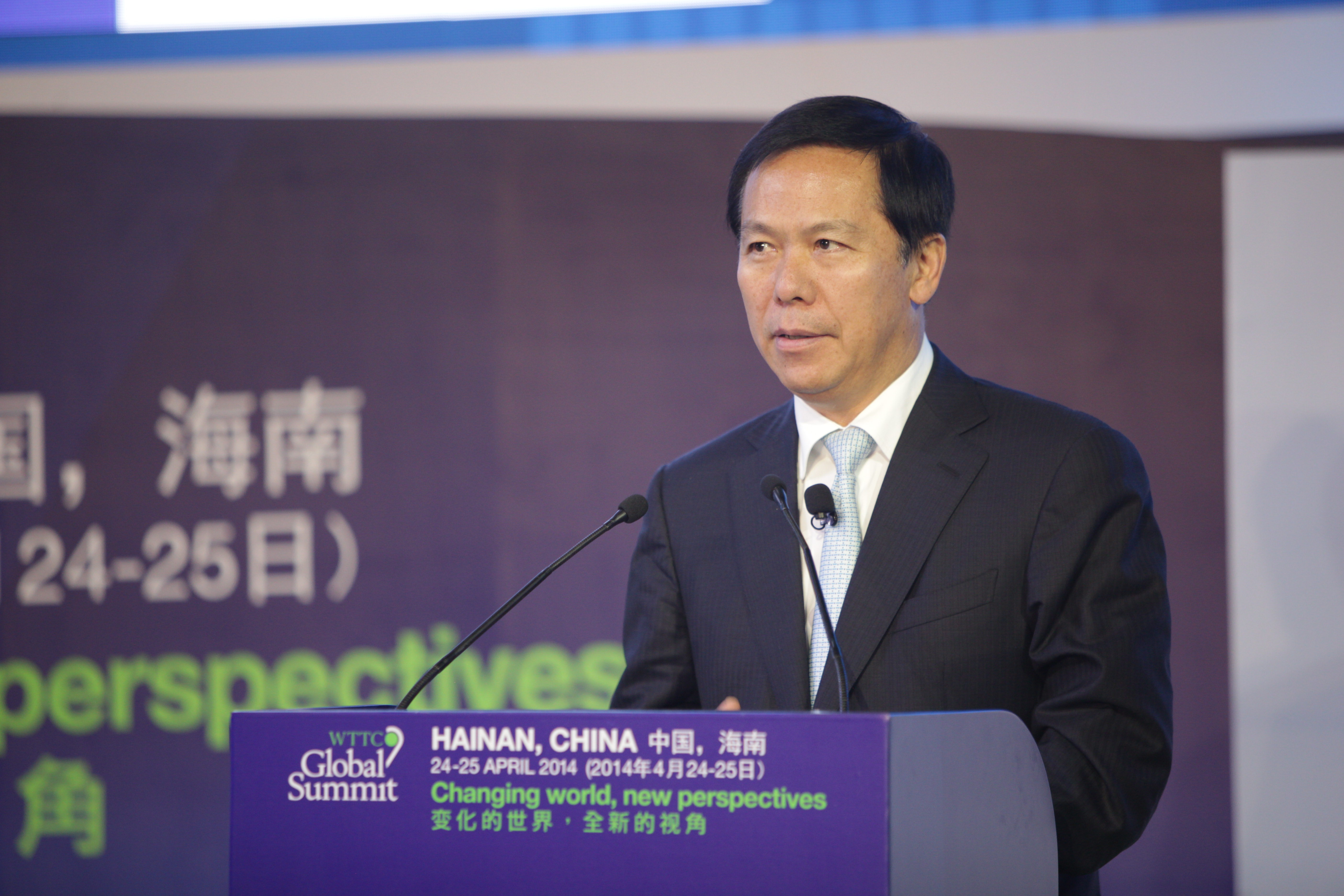
- Liu in 2014

Chairman of China Eastern Air Holding Company
- In office December 2016 – July 2022
- Preceded by: New title
- Succeeded by: Wang Zhiqing

General Manager of China Eastern Airlines Group Corporation
- In office December 2008 – December 2016
- Preceded by: Li Fenghua
- Succeeded by: Ma Xulun

General Manager of China Southern Airlines Group Corporation
- In office August 2004 – December 2008
- Preceded by: Yan Zhiqing
- Succeeded by: Si Xianmin

Personal details
- Born: November 1958 (age 67–68) Luoshan County, Henan, China
- Party: Chinese Communist Party (1977-2026, expelled)
- Education: 14th Aviation School of the People's Liberation Army; Tianjin University of Finance and Economics; Tsinghua University

Chinese name
- Simplified Chinese: 刘绍勇
- Traditional Chinese: 劉紹勇
Transcriptions
Standard Mandarin
- Hanyu Pinyin: Liú Shàoyǒng

Liu Shaoyong (Chinese: 刘绍勇; born November 1958) is a retired Chinese pilot and executive. As of June 2025 he was under investigation by China's top anti-graft watchdog. He was general manager of China Eastern Airlines Group Corporation from 2008 to 2016 and chairman from 2016 to 2022. He was a delegate to the 11th National People's Congress, a member of the 13th National Committee of the Chinese People's Political Consultative Conference, and a representative of the 18th National Congress of the Chinese Communist Party.

== Early life and education ==
Liu was born in Luoshan County, Henan, in November 1958, and graduated from the 14th Aviation School of the People's Liberation Army, Tianjin University of Finance and Economics, and Tsinghua University.

== Career ==
Liu was a pilot of the Second Air Force of China Civil Aviation in his early years.

Since 1995, he stepped onto management positions, including deputy general manager of General Aviation Corporation of China, deputy director of Shanxi Provincial Administration of Civil Aviation of China, general manager of Shanxi Branch of China Eastern Airlines, and director of Flight Standards Department of Civil Aviation Administration of China. He was general manager of China Eastern Airlines Co., Ltd. in December 2000 and subsequently deputy director of the Civil Aviation Administration of China in October 2002. He was general manager of China Southern Airlines Group Corporation in August 2004, concurrently serving as chairman of China Southern Airlines Co., Ltd. since November of the same year. He was appointed general manager of China Eastern Airlines Group Corporation in December 2008, in addition to serving as chairman of China Eastern Airlines Co., Ltd. In December 2016, he rose to become chairman of China Eastern Airlines Group Corporation, although he remained chairman of China Eastern Airlines Co., Ltd. until July 2022.

== Downfall ==
On 28 June 2025, Liu was put under investigation for alleged "serious violations of discipline and laws" by the Central Commission for Discipline Inspection (CCDI), the party's internal disciplinary body, and the National Supervisory Commission, the highest anti-corruption agency of China. Liu was expelled from the party on 4 January 2026.

On 3 November 2026, Liu was sentenced to 14 years and fined 4 million yuan at the Shenyang Intermediate People's Court, for taking bribes in 67.5 million yuan.

Business positions
Preceded by Yan Zhiqing	General Manager of China Southern Airlines Group Corporation; 2004–2008	Succeeded by Si Xianmin
Preceded by Li Fenghua	General Manager of China Eastern Airlines Group Corporation; 2008–2016	Succeeded by Ma Xulun
New title	Chairman of China Eastern Airlines Group Corporation; 2016–2022	Succeeded by Wang Zhiqing
