= HKJ (disambiguation) =

HKJ is an abbreviation for the Hashemite Kingdom of Jordan, a country more commonly known simply as Jordan.

HKJ may also refer to:

- Hongkong Jet, an airline from Hong Kong
- Hapoel Katamon Jerusalem F.C., a football club from Jerusalem, Israel
