= List of airlines of China =

As of October 2026, Mainland China has 53 airlines are qualified to operate trunk routes. Among them, 41 are passenger airlines or mainly transporting passenger and 12 are cargo airlines.

This is a list of airlines which have a current Air Operator Certificate issued by the Civil Aviation Administration of China (Chinese: 中国民用航空局).
All airlines listed below are based in Mainland China.

== Scheduled airlines ==
=== Major ===
Airline	Chinese name	Image	IATA	ICAO	Callsign	Hub(s)	Commenced operations
Air China	中国国际航空		CA	CCA	AIR CHINA	Beijing–Capital; Beijing–Daxing; Chengdu–Shuangliu; Chengdu–Tianfu; Shanghai–Pudong; Shenzhen	1988
China Eastern Airlines	中国东方航空		MU	CES	CHINA EASTERN	Shanghai–Hongqiao; Shanghai–Pudong; Beijing–Daxing; Kunming; Xi'an	1988
China Southern Airlines	中国南方航空		CZ	CSN	CHINA SOUTHERN	Guangzhou; Beijing–Daxing; Chongqing; Shanghai–Pudong; Shenzhen; Ürümqi	1991
Hainan Airlines	海南航空		HU	CHH	HAINAN	Haikou; Beijing–Capital; Chongqing; Shenzhen; Xi'an	1989
Juneyao Airlines	吉祥航空		HO	DKH	AIR JUNEYAO	Shanghai–Hongqiao; Shanghai–Pudong	2005
Shanghai Airlines	上海航空		FM	CSH	SHANGHAI AIR	Shanghai–Hongqiao; Shanghai–Pudong	1985
Shenzhen Airlines	深圳航空		ZH	CSZ	SHENZHEN AIR	Shenzhen	1993
Sichuan Airlines	四川航空		3U	CSC	SI CHUAN	Chengdu–Shuangiu; Chengdu–Tianfu; Chongqing; Kunming	1986
XiamenAir	厦门航空		MF	CXA	XIAMEN AIR	Xiamen; Fuzhou; Hangzhou	1984

=== Low-cost airlines ===
Airline	Chinese name	Image	IATA	ICAO	Callsign	Hub(s)	Commenced operations
9 Air	九元航空		AQ	JYH	TRANS JADE	Guangzhou	2015
Beijing Capital Airlines	首都航空		JD	CBJ	CAPITAL JET	Qingdao	2010
Colorful Guizhou Airlines	多彩贵州航空		GY	CGZ	COLORFUL	Guiyang	2015
China United Airlines	中国联合航空		KN	CUA	LIANHANG	Beijing–Daxing	1986
Jiangxi Air	江西航空		RY	CJX	AIR CRANE	Nanchang	2016
Lucky Air	祥鹏航空		8L	LKE	LUCKY AIR	Kunming	2004
Ruili Airlines	苏南瑞丽航空		DR	RLH	SENDI	Kunming	2014
Spring Airlines	春秋航空		9C	CQH	AIR SPRING	Shanghai–Hongqiao	2005
Tianjin Airlines	天津航空		GS	GCR	BOHAI	Tianjin	2007
Urumqi Air	乌鲁木齐航空		UQ	CUH	LOU LAN	Urumqi	2014
West Air	西部航空		PN	CHB	WEST CHINA	Chongqing	2010

=== Domestic & regional airlines ===
Airline	Chinese name	Image	IATA	ICAO	Callsign	Hub(s)	Commenced operations
Air Guilin	桂林航空		GT	CGH	WELKIN	Guilin	2016
Air Chang'an	长安航空		9H	CGN	CHANG AN	Xi'an	1992
Air Travel	湖南航空		A6	OTC	AIR TRAVEL	Changsha	2016
Chengdu Airlines	成都航空		EU	UEA	UNITED EAGLE	Chengdu–Shuangliu	2005
China Eastern Yunnan Airlines	中国东方航空云南有限公司		MU	CES	CHINA EASTERN	Kunming	1992
China Express Airlines	华夏航空		G5	HXA	CHINA EXPRESS	Chongqing	2006
China Flying Dragon Aviation	中国飞龙航空		FL	CFA	FEILONG	Harbin	1981
Chongqing Airlines	重庆航空		OQ	CQN	CHONG QING	Chongqing	2007
Dalian Airlines	大连航空		CA	CCD	XIANGJIAN	Dalian	2011
Donghai Airlines	东海航空		DZ	EPA	DONGHAI AIR	Shenzhen	2006
Fuzhou Airlines	福州航空		FU	FZA	STRAIT AIR	Fuzhou	2014
Grand China Air	大新华航空		CN	GDC	GRAND CHINA	Haikou	2007
Guangxi Beibu Gulf Airlines	北部湾航空		GX	CBG	GREEN CITY	Nanning	2015
Hebei Airlines	河北航空		NS	HBH	HEBEI AIR	Shijiazhuang	2010
Kunming Airlines	昆明航空		KY	KNA	KUNMING AIR	Kunming	2009
Longjiang Airlines	龙江航空		LT	SNG	SNOW EAGLE	Harbin	2017
Loong Air	长龙航空		GJ	CDC	GUALONG	Hangzhou	2012
Okay Airways	奥凯航空		BK	OKA	OKAYJET	Tianjin	2005
Qingdao Airlines	青岛航空		QW	QDA	SKY LEGEND	Qingdao	2014
Shandong Airlines	山东航空		SC	CDG	SHANDONG	Jinan; Qingdao	1994
Suparna Airlines	金鹏航空		Y8	YZR	YANGTZE RIVER	Shanghai–Hongqiao	2003
Tian Jiao Airlines	天骄航空		9D	NMG	TIANJIAO AIR	Hohhot	2019
Xizang Airlines	西藏航空		TV	TBA	TIBET	Lhasa; Chengdu–Shuangliu	2011

== Cargo airlines ==
Airline	Chinese name	Image	IATA	ICAO	Callsign	Hub(s)	Commenced operations
Air Central	中原龙浩航空		GI	LHA	AIR CANTON	Zhengzhou	2015
Air China Cargo	中国国际货运航空		CA	CAO	AIRCHINA FREIGHT	Beijing–Capital; Shanghai–Pudong	2003
Central Airlines	中州航空		I9	HLF	HOMELAND	Haikou	2020
China Cargo Airlines	中国货运航空		CK	CKK	CARGO KING	Shanghai–Pudong; Shanghai–Hongqiao	1998
China Postal Airlines	中国邮政航空		8Y	CYZ	CHINA POST	Nanjing	1997
China Southern Cargo	中国南方航空		CZ	CSN	CHINA SOUTHERN	Shanghai–Pudong; Guangzhou	2011
Jiangsu Jingdong Cargo Airlines	江苏京东货运航空		JG	JDL	Kuayue Express	Nantong	2019
North-Western Cargo International Airlines	西北国际货航		CO	CNW	TANG	Xi'an	2017
SF Airlines	顺丰航空		O3	CSS	SHUN FENG	Shenzhen	2009
Sichuan Airlines Cargo	四川航空		3U	CSC	SI CHUAN	Chengdu–Shuangliu; Chongqing; Kunming	1986
Suparna Airlines Cargo	金鹏航空		Y8	YZR	YANGTZE RIVER	Shanghai–Hongqiao	2003
Tianjin Air Cargo	天津货运航空		HT	CTJ	TIANJIN CARGO	Tianjin	2016
YTO Cargo Airlines	圆通航空		YG	HYT	QUICK AIR	Hangzhou	2015

== See also ==
- List of defunct airlines of Asia
- List of defunct airlines of China
- List of airlines of Hong Kong
- List of airlines of Macau
- List of airlines of Taiwan
- List of airlines
- List of airline holding companies

Airports

- List of airports in China
- China's busiest airports by passenger traffic
