= List of airlines of Taiwan =

This is a list of airlines currently based in Taiwan.

== Full-service airline ==
Airline	Chinese name	Image	IATA	ICAO	Callsign	Commenced operations	Notes
China Airlines	中華航空		CI	CAL	DYNASTY	1959	Flag carrier of ROC; Member of SkyTeam
EVA Air	長榮航空		BR	EVA	EVA	1989	Member of Star Alliance
Starlux Airlines	星宇航空		JX	SJX	STARWALKER	2020	

== Regional airline ==
Airline	Chinese name	Image	IATA	ICAO	Callsign	Commenced operations	Notes
Mandarin Airlines	華信航空		AE	MDA	MANDARIN	1991	Subsidiary of China Airlines
Uni Air	立榮航空		B7	UIA	GLORY	1988	Subsidiary of EVA Air

== Low cost airline ==
Airline	Chinese name	Image	IATA	ICAO	Callsign	Commenced operations	Notes
Tigerair Taiwan	台灣虎航		IT	TTW	SMART CAT	2014	Subsidiary of China Airlines

== Commuter airlines ==
Airline	Chinese name	Image	IATA	ICAO	Callsign	Commenced operations	Notes
Daily Air	德安航空		DA	DAC	DAILY	1992	Passenger services to and between offshore islands
Emerald Pacific Airlines	凌天航空					1994	Aerial photography, fumigation, disaster relief, overhead power line insulator cleaning, construction loading/rigging, etc.
APEX Aviation	安捷航空				APEX	2022	Flight school, Aerial photography, Offshore wind turbine communte, air ambulance, etc.

== Cargo airlines ==
Airline	Chinese name	Image	IATA	ICAO	Callsign	Commenced operations	Notes
China Airlines Cargo	中華航空貨運		CI	CAL	DYNASTY	1959	Flag carrier of ROC
EVA Air Cargo	長榮航空貨運		BR	EVA	EVA	1989	
Starlux Airlines Cargo	星宇航空貨運		JX	SJX	STARWALKER	2020	

== See also ==
- List of airlines
- List of airlines of China
- List of airlines of Hong Kong
- List of airlines of Macau
- List of defunct airlines of Taiwan
- List of defunct airlines of Asia
