= Northeast Airlines (China) =

IATA	ICAO	Call sign
NS	DBH	DONGBEI AIR
- Founded: 2006
- Commenced operations: 2007
- Ceased operations: 2010 (rebranded as Hebei Airlines)
- Hubs: Shenyang Taoxian International Airport
- Fleet size: 3
- Parent company: Shenyang Aircraft
- Headquarters: Shenyang, China

Northeast Airlines Company (S: 东北航空公司, T: 東北航空公司, P: Dōngběi Hángkōng Gōngsī) was an airline based in Shenyang, People's Republic of China. The airline was rebranded as Hebei Airlines on June 29, 2010.

== History ==
Northeast Airlines was established in 2006 as a subsidiary of Shenyang Aircraft. On November 8, 2007, the airline received its operation approval from the Civil Aviation Administration of China (CAAC). In 2010, it was rebranded as Hebei Airlines.
