= Central Air Traffic Management Committee =

Chinese Communist Party body

- 中央空中交通管理委员会
- Emblem of the Chinese Communist Party

Deliberative and coordinating body overview
- Formed: 30 January 1986
- Jurisdiction: Chinese Communist Party
- Headquarters: Beijing
- Deliberative and coordinating body executive: Ding Xuexiang, Director; Deputy Director; Cai Jianjiang, Office Director
- Parent Deliberative and coordinating body: Central Committee of the Chinese Communist Party
- Child Deliberative and coordinating body: Office

Central Air Traffic Management Committee
- Simplified Chinese: 中央空中交通管理委员会
Transcriptions
Standard Mandarin
- Hanyu Pinyin: Zhōngyāng Kōngzhōng Jiāotōng Guǎnlǐ Wěiyuánhuì

The Central Air Traffic Management Committee is a deliberative and coordinating body under the Central Committee of the Chinese Communist Party responsible for national airspace management.

== History ==
On 30 January 30 1986, Deng Xiaoping, Chairman of the Central Military Commission, approved the establishment of the State Council and the Central Military Commission Air Traffic Control Committee, with a vice premier concurrently serving as the director of the National Air Traffic Control Committee.

In October 2020, the National Air Traffic Control Committee was reorganized into the Central Air Traffic Management Committee. In March 2021, the new Central Air Traffic Management Committee was officially launched.

== Functions ==
The committee is China's highest body regarding national airspace control.
