= Civil Aviation University of China =

National public university in Tianjin, China

Coordinates: 39°06′05″N 117°24′17″E

- 中国民航大学
- Motto: 笃学精博 严谨创新
- Motto in English: Dedicated to Learning, Mastery and Innovation with Rigor
- Type: National, public university
- Established: September 25, 1951
- Chairman: Jing Yihong (景一宏)
- President: Dong Jiankang (董健康)
- Academic staff: 1068
- Students: about 22 000
- Undergraduates: 20 000
- Postgraduates: 1 200
- Location: Tianjin, China
- Campus: Urban
- Website: cauc.edu.cn

The Civil Aviation University of China (CAUC; 中国民航大学) is a public university in Tianjin, China. It is affiliated with the Civil Aviation Administration of China and co-funded by the Tianjin Municipal People's Government and the Ministry of Education. The institute focuses on providing higher education in civil aviation engineering technology and management. The university is next to the Tianjin Binhai International Airport. CAUC consists of two campus, the northern and the southern campuses, with a total area 1.03 million m^{2}.

== History ==
The university founded in 1951 began as a dedicated civil aviation university for the People's Republic of China. CAUC celebrated her 60th. anniversary in 2011 in Tianjin. Civil Aviation Institute of China (CAIC) embraces her transformation into Civil Aviation University of China (CAUC) granted by State Commission Office and General Administration of Civil Aviation of China on July 20, 2006. The university is administered by the Civil Aviation Administration of China, which comes under the branch of the Ministry of Transport of the People's Republic of China.

=== Faculty ===
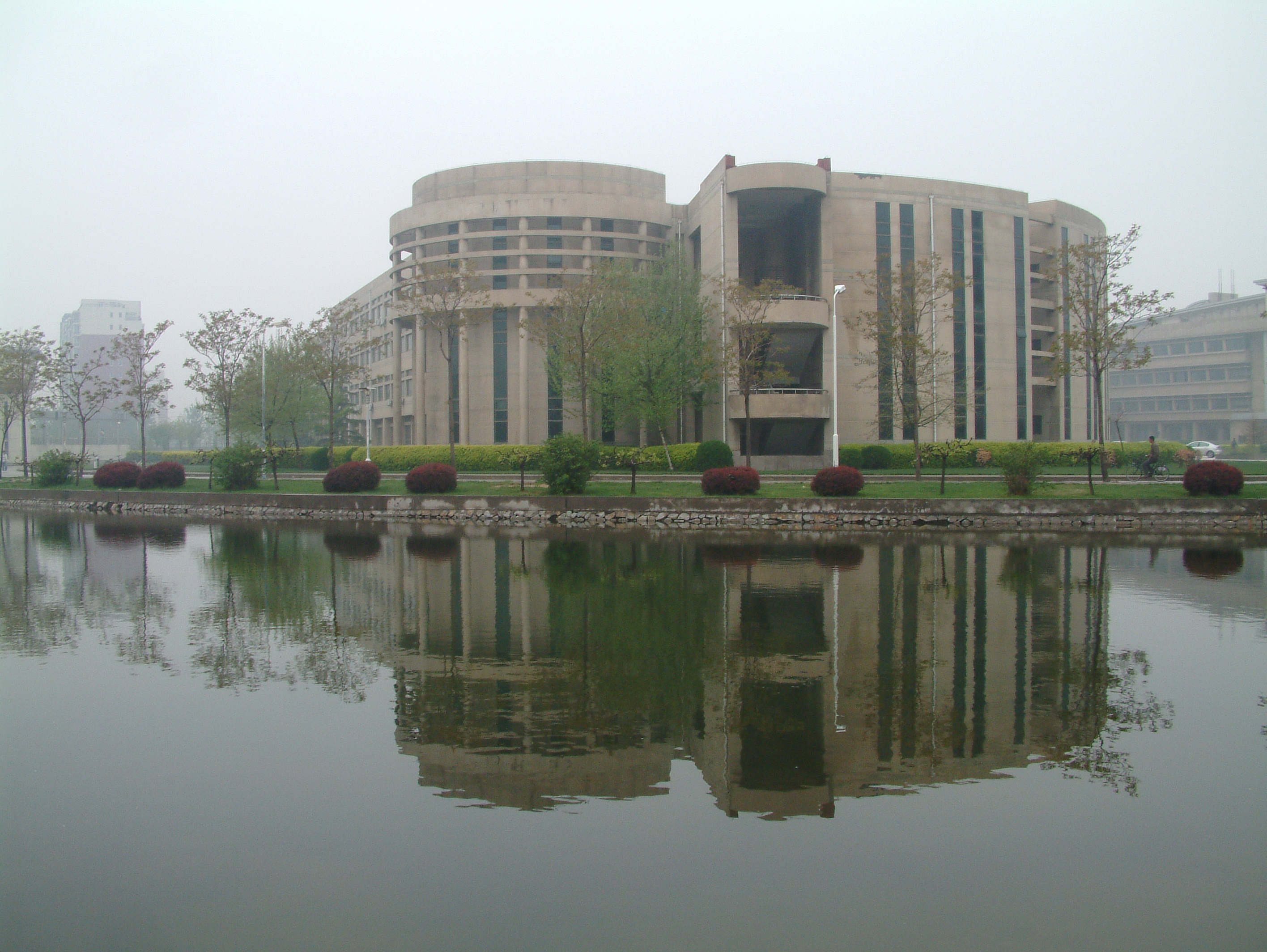
The View of CAUC

The university has grown to over 1000 teaching staff. The majority of them hold master's degree or doctor degree. One professor (Dr. Renbiao Wu) won China National Funds for Distinguished Young Scientist. Four professors hold the honors of "Distinguished Experts" from Civil Aviation Administration of China.

=== Students ===
The total population of students studying at the university is 22000. This comprises 20000 undergraduates and 1200 postgraduates.

CAUC graduates serving the aviation industry consist of one-seventh of all the civil aviation staffs, spreading at home and abroad. There currently over 30,000 CAUC graduates working in the civil aviation sector.

CAUC provides aviation education and continuing education open to Chinese and overseas trainees. It has 6 training centers are qualified for aircraft maintenance certificate programs in accordance with the technical specifications of CAAC or FAA. It is authorized: by IATA to conduct training in air transport and dangerous goods transport; by CAAC to train air traffic controllers, air transport agents and cabin attendants; by the Ministry of Labor Safeguard to train qualified secretaries.

The university continue to have strong foreign cooperation and exchanges. CAUC has relationships with ICAO, IATA, AECMA, FAA, JAA, Boeing Aircraft, United Airlines, Pratt & Whitney, Rolls-Royce, Airbus Industrie, aviation universities and research institutes in Britain, USA, France, Russia and Australia. Academic exchanges with Hong Kong, Macau and foreign countries run frequent. Many foreign experts or scholars are invited to deliver lectures or to pay visits to CAUC.

== Structure ==
The university compose of 9 colleges, 49 master's degree programs and 27 undergraduate specialties. The communication and information system course has been awarded the title of Key Discipline of Tianjin.

- College of Aeronautical Mechanics and Avionics Engineering
- College of Air Traffic Management
- College of Transportation Engineering
- College of Safety Science and Engineering
- College of Computer Science and Technology
- College of Humanities and Social Sciences
- College of Management
- College of Sciences
- College of Cabin Attendant
- Flying College
- Vocational Technical College

== Research ==
CAUC is a research intensive university. It has 14 provincial and ministerial key laboratories, covering almost all the disciplines the university has. CAUC research focus extensively in flight safety, aircraft type selection, aircraft and engine failure diagnosis, FANS, economic benefits evaluation for civil aviation enterprises, air transport management, information engineering and computer application.

== Library ==
The university has a modern library which possesses a huge collection of Chinese and foreign books, journals, electronic publications, and technical documents for civil aircraft. It has over 1,645,000 volumes of books, about 886 subjects in Chinese and 213 foreign language current periodicals, about seventy of newspapers, and more than 2380 items of non-paper materials, including CDROMs, microfiches, videotapes, audio tapes, audio CDs, etc. The library also provides about 80 online databases. The library is located on the south campus. The library occupies an area of 14944 metres^{2}.

== See also ==
- Civil Aviation Flight University of China (CAFUC) in Sichuan
- List of universities in China
