= Si Xianmin =

Former president of China Southern Airlines

- 司献民
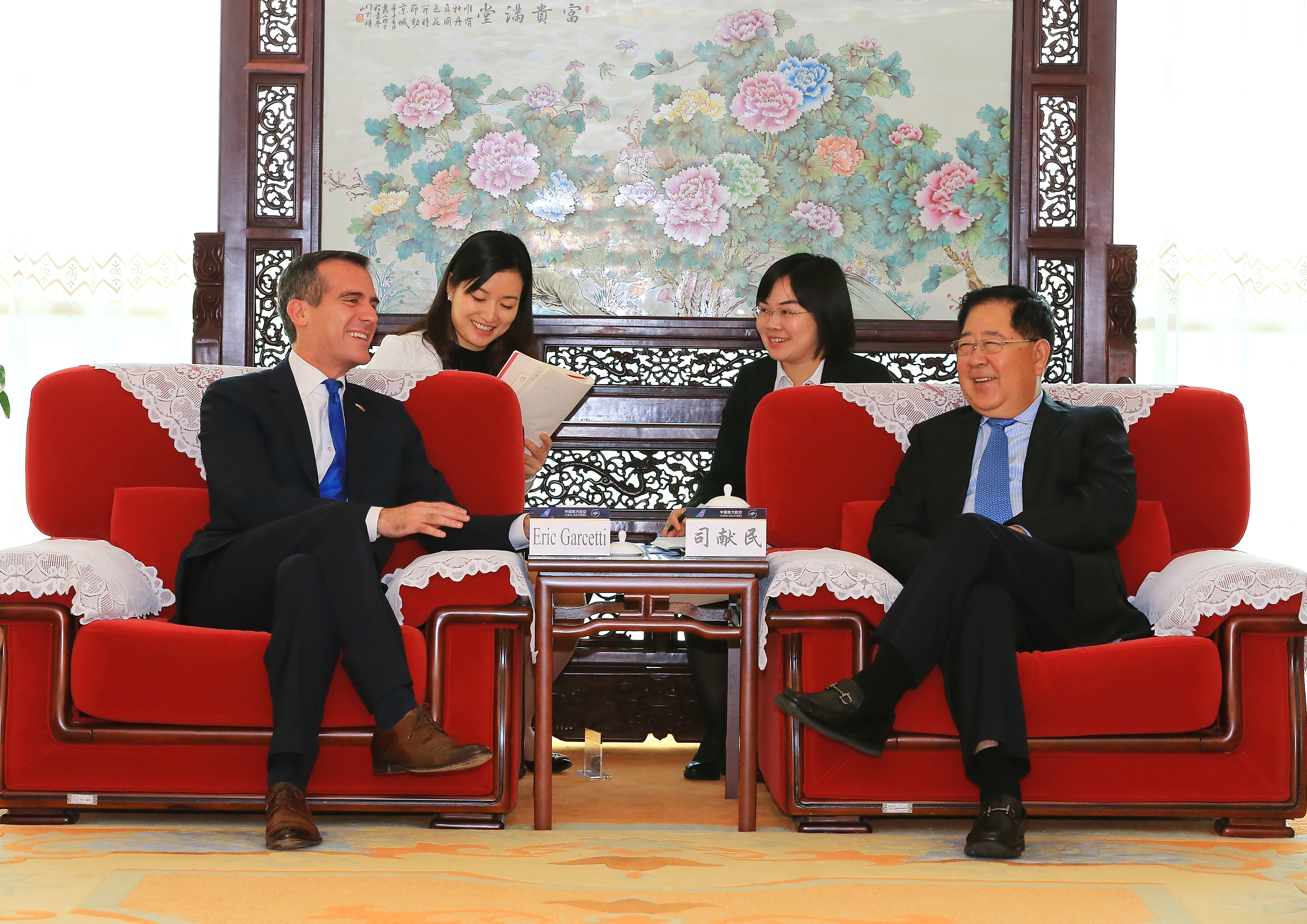
- Si Xianmin (right) with Eric Garcetti in November 2014
- Born: November 1957 (age 68–69); Lushan County, Henan, China
- Education: Civil Aviation Flight University of China; Tsinghua University
- Occupations: Chairman of China Southern Airlines (October 2004 – November 2015); General Manager of China Southern Airlines (January 2009 – November 2015)
- Years active: 1975–2015
- Political party: Chinese Communist Party (1976–2016; expelled)

Si Xianmin (simplified Chinese: 司献民; traditional Chinese: 司獻民; pinyin: Sī Xiànmín; born November 1957) is a former Chinese business executive who served as chairman and general manager of China Southern Airlines, the world's sixth-largest airline measured by passengers carried and Asia's largest airline in fleet size and passengers carried. Si Xiamin spent more than 20 years in China Southern Airlines. He was a delegate to the 12th National People's Congress. In November 2015, he was placed under investigation by the Central Commission for Discipline Inspection. He is the first head of civil aviation in China implicated since the beginning of Xi Jinping's anti-corruption drive after he took power in late 2012.

== Biography ==
=== Career ===
Born in November 1957, Si Xianmin graduated from the School of Economics and Management, Tsinghua University as well as Civil Aviation Flight University of China.

Beginning in 1975, he worked in China's civil aviation field. In 1992 he entered China Southern Airlines, China's largest airline by passenger traffic, he served as its deputy director and then director of Henan Branch Office, he remained in that position until 1998, when he was transferred to southwest China's Guizhou province and appointed the Chinese Communist Party Committee Secretary and deputy general manager of Guizhou Branch Office. In 2000 he was transferred again to Guangzhou, capital of Guangdong province, he was elevated to Chinese Communist Party Deputy Committee Secretary of China Southern Airlines, a position he held until 2003. He was promoted to CCP Committee Secretary of its North Branch in 2003, and held that office until October 2004. Then he was promoted again to become its general manager, and he concurrently served as its chairman in January 2009.

=== Downfall ===
Between 26 November 2014 to 30 December 2014, the first team the Chinese Communist Party's internal control body were tipped off about suspected violations during their checks of China Southern Airlines. It was not long before the company's three deputy general managers Chen Gang (陈港), Xu Jiebo (徐杰波), Zhou Yuehai (周岳海) and operation director Tian Xiaodong (田晓东) were sacked for graft.

On November 4, 2015, "Si Xianmin has come under investigation for serious violations of discipline", Central Commission for Discipline Inspection said in a statement on its website, without elaborating.

On February 3, 2016, Si Xianmin was expelled from the Chinese Communist Party. The investigation concluded that Si violated Eight-point Regulation, played golf with public funds, accepted bribes etc.

On April 28, 2017, Si Xianmin was sentenced to 10 years and 6 months in prison for taking bribes worth 7.89 million yuan (~$1.14 million) in Shenzhen People's Intermediate Court.

Business positions
Preceded by Liu Shaoyong	General Manager of China Southern Airlines; 2009–2015	Succeeded by Wang Changshun
