= Civil Aviation Flight University of China =

National public aviation university in Guanghan, Sichuan, China

- 中国民用航空飞行学院
- Motto: Lofty Aspiration, Far-reaching Flight, Profound Knowledge and Great Perseverance
- Type: National
- Established: May 26, 1956
- President: Guan Lixin (关立欣)
- Academic staff: 800
- Administrative staff: 1,800
- Students: 16,000
- Location: Guanghan, Sichuan, China
- Campus: 10.66 square kilometers (2,630 acres)
- Colors: blue, white and red
- Website: cafuc.edu.cn cafuc.ac.cn

Civil Aviation Flight University of China
- Simplified Chinese: 中国民用航空飞行学院
- Traditional Chinese: 中國民用航空飛行學院
Transcriptions
Standard Mandarin
- Hanyu Pinyin: Zhōngguó Mínyòng Hángkōng Fēixíng Xuéyuàn

The Civil Aviation Flight University of China (CAFUC; 中国民用航空飞行学院) is the national civil flight training university of China, headquartered in Guanghan, Sichuan, China. It is owned by the Civil Aviation Administration of China and co-funded by the Sichuan Provincial People's Government.

The university is the largest civil aviation university in Asia and the world's largest flight training institution.

CAFUC is the only full-time regular institution of higher education mainly for civil aviation pilots and controllers, from which nearly 90% civil aviation captains and 50% air traffic controllers graduated. With its headquarter located in Guanghan City, Sichuan Province, CAFUC, covering a total area of 10.66 square kilometers (2,630 acres), owns five airports as its sub-colleges for flight training, which are Xinjin Airport, Guanghan Airport, Luoyang Airport, Mianyang Airport, and Suining Airport.

CAFUC is the first integrate institution for Private Pilot License, Commercial Pilot License, and Airline Transport Pilot License. Authorized by Civil Aviation Administration of China, it's also the training and test center of examiners for International Civil Aviation Organization license tests for pilots and air traffic controllers. CAFUC also offers technological supports for the Legislation of Chinese Civil Aviation.

== History ==
CAFUC was founded on May 26, 1956, by Civil Aviation Administration of China (CAAC) in the name of Aviation College of CAAC. On September 22 of the same year, CAFUC was transferred to the administration of Chinese National Defense and named after The 14th Aviation College of People's Liberation Army (PLA). On October 25, 1963, CAFUC became Advanced Chinese Civil Aviation College after a negotiation and discussion between CAAC and Chinese Air Force. On May 19, 1971, CAFUC was again brought into the system of Chinese Air Force. In 1980, CAFUC returned to the administration of CAAC and was listed among the colleges for higher education. Since December 15, 1987, CAFUC has been entitled as Civil Aviation Flight University of China.

Today CAFUC has more than 16,000 full-time students, 5 airports and 262 airplanes. There are more than 3300 faculties and 1300 teachers working in CAFUC. Among them there are more than 400 people who enjoy respectful titles such as first-class pilot, honored pilot, winner of special government allowance, expert in ICAO and senior engineer. CAFUC is the largest civil aviation university in Asia and has contributed more than 100,000 graduates for civil aviation of China as well as of other Asian and African countries.

== Facilities ==
Besides covering a total area of 10.66 square kilometers (2,630 acres), CAFUC also possesses various valuable facilities for education, worthing more than 6.2 billion Yuan (1 billion US dollars):

5 airports for flight training purpose, among which both Luoyang Airport and Mianyang Airport are also served as commercial airports with more than 1 million registered passenger traffic and total traffic movements;

In total 262 airplanes for different training levels and 45 sets of 360 degrees flight simulators;

The exclusively state-of-the-art air traffic control system with 360-degree full view built in the ATC tower building in campus;

More than 400 aircraft engines;

The largest library of civil aviation in China with more than 1 million books, more than 3 million e-books and 33 international database.

== Research ==
CAFUC has in total 7 key labs including key national bases for scientific research of flight technology and aviation safety, digital simulation research lab (cooperate with Wisesoft Co., Ltd.) and key research lab for flight in plateau. In recent 5 years, CAFUC has launched 33 national projects such as 'the 863 project', Major Program of National Natural Science Foundation of China and Major Program of National Philosophy and Social Science Foundation of China, and won more than 127 national prizes in science and technology.

== International Collaboration ==
CAFUC has received international students from countries in Asia and Africa since early 1960s, from which more than 6000 international students preparing to become pilots, air traffic controllers and maintenance personnel have achieved their graduation. Since then, CAFUC has established wide connections with a wealth of international organizations and companies including ICAO, IATA, FAA, Joint Aviation Authorities (JAA), Boeing, Airbus, EADS, SNECMA, GE and IAE. Since the year 2000, more than 5000 students have studied abroad in the US, UK and Australia. Currently there are about 25 visiting scholars from all over the world.

== Academics ==
CAFUC has 9 academic colleges/institutes, which are independently in charge of administration, scientific research and teaching organization.

=== College of Air Traffic Management ===
- Air traffic control (national specialty major)

=== College of Flight Technology ===
- Flight technology (national specialty major)

College of Flight Technology mainly conducts theoretical teaching for junior pilot students as well as for inflight pilots. Currently, the college has more than 80 faculty members which are involved in 4 teaching groups: Flight mechanics, Basis of flight technology, Aviation psychology and Navigation. Meanwhile, it has been a leading power in the research of flight technologies, security and human factors. The college is also home to some research/teaching labs including Flight simulation, Psychology of pilots, Wind tunnel and Advanced navigation technologies.

=== Aviation Engineering Institute ===
- Air vehicle propulsion engineering
- Aircraft manufacturing engineering
- Electronic and information engineering
- Electrical and automation engineering
- Security engineering
- Airworthiness engineering

=== School of Airport Engineering and Transportation Management ===
- Business management
- Marketing
- Logistics management
- Traffic engineering

=== School of Computer Technology ===
- Computer science and technology
- Information and computation science

=== School of Foreign Language Studies ===
- English

=== School of Cabin Attendants ===
- Cabin attendants

=== School of Air Security Protection ===
- Air safety guard
- Air security inspection

== Flight training airports ==
- Xinjin Airport
- Guanghan Airport
- Luoyang Airport
- Mianyang Airport
- Suining Airport

== Notable alumni ==
- Chen Feng (陈峰), the Founder and Chairman of HNA Group
- Liu Shaoyong (刘绍勇), Chairman of China Eastern Airlines, former Chairman of China Southern Airlines
- Si Xianmin, Chairman of China Southern Airlines
- Yang Yuanyuan, former Director of the Civil Aviation Administration of China
- Li Jian (李健), Vice Director of the Civil Aviation Administration of China
- Xia Xinghua (夏兴华), Vice Director of the Civil Aviation Administration of China
