= Ying'an Airlines =

Chinese airline

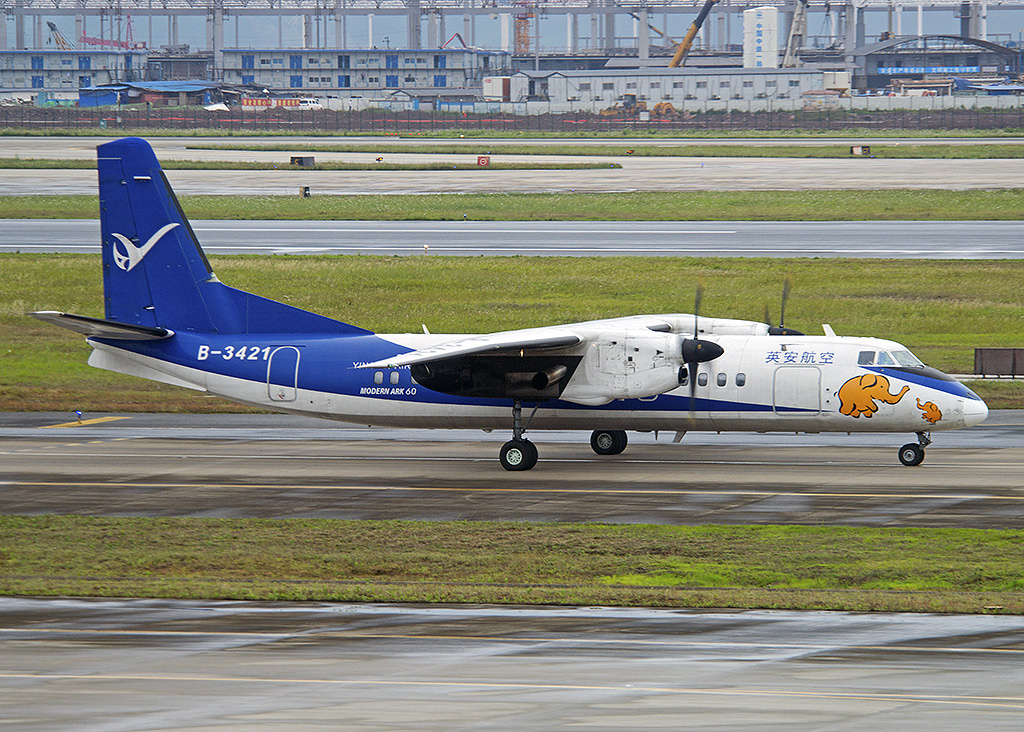
- Ying'an Airlines' sole Xian MA60 at Chongqing Airport
IATA	ICAO	Call sign
YI	AYE	AIR YING AN
- Founded: 2005
- Ceased operations: 2015
- Hubs: Guiyang Longdongbao International Airport
- Fleet size: 1
- Destinations: 3
- Parent company: Guangdong Ying'an Transport Service Co Ltd (56.5%); Li Guiying (43.5%)
- Headquarters: Pu'er City, Yunnan, China
- Key people: Li Guiying, CEO
- Website: yingair.yndinghao.com

Ying'an Airlines
- Simplified Chinese: 英安航空
Transcriptions
Standard Mandarin
- Hanyu Pinyin: Yīng Ān Hángkōng

Yunnan Ying'an Airlines, branded as Ying'an Airlines, was a Chinese regional airline based at Guiyang Longdongbao International Airport in Guizhou. It operated flights throughout Yunnan Province as well as in Guizhou Province using a single Xian MA60 aircraft.

The airline suspended operations on 1 December 2015, and it is unknown when service will resume. The Civil Aviation Administration of China (CAAC) cancelled Ying'an Airlines' air operator's certificate as it was not meeting the certificate's requirements.

== History ==
Ying'an Airlines was founded in 2005 as Yunnan Ying'an General Aviation Co Ltd, a general aviation company. It received its air operator's certificate from the CAAC on 19 January 2005.

In 2008 the airline placed orders for Xian MA60 aircraft, supplementing its fleet of Harbin Y-12s.

On 7 December 2010, Ying'an Airlines was granted preliminary approval from the CAAC to operate regional passenger and cargo flights. The airline conducted a trial charter flight between Pu'er City and Kunming on 17 February 2011.

Ying'an Airlines commenced passenger operations on 23 April 2014, flying from Libo to Chongqing via Guiyang with its MA60 aircraft.

On 18 December 2014, Ying'an Airlines signed a cooperation agreement with Joy Air, with the intent of increasing the former's registered capital to CNY 1 billion (US$161 million) and expanding its fleet to 30 aircraft. Ultimately, the agreement hopes to transform Ying'an Airlines into a major regional airline in Southeast China.

Ying'an Airlines suspended operations on 1 December 2015, and the temporary operating permit it had received from the CAAC was invalidated on 4 December. As of January 2017, the airline's profile at ch-aviation indicates that Ying'an Airlines is "restarting".

== Corporate affairs ==
Ying'an Airlines was a joint venture between Guangdong Ying'an Transport Service Co Ltd (56.5%) and CEO Li Guiying (43.5%). The two invested CNY 80.7 million (US$12 million) in the airline. Through a cooperation agreement signed between Ying'an Airlines and Joy Air in December 2014, the registered capital will be raised to CNY 1 billion (US$161 million).

== Destinations ==
Ying'an Airlines flew to the following destinations:

City/County	Province	Country	Airport	Notes	Refs
Chongqing	Chongqing	People's Republic of China	Chongqing Jiangbei International Airport		
Guiyang	Guizhou	People's Republic of China	Guiyang Longdongbao International Airport^{[Hub]}		
Libo County	Guizhou	People's Republic of China	Libo Airport		

== Fleet ==
The Ying'an Airlines fleet consisted of the following aircraft (as of August 2016):

Ying'an Airlines fleet
Aircraft	In service	Orders	Passengers	Notes
Xian MA60	1	—	60	
