= List of airlines of Macau =

This is a list of airlines which have a current Air Operator Certificate issued by the Civil Aviation Authority of Macau (Chinese: 民航局, Portuguese: Autoridade de Aviação Civil). For airlines of Mainland China, Hong Kong and Taiwan, see List of airlines of China, List of airlines of Hong Kong, List of airlines of Taiwan.

== Scheduled airlines ==
| Airline | Airline (in Chinese) | Image | ICAO | IATA | Callsign | Commenced operations |
|---|---|---|---|---|---|---|
| Air Macau | 澳門航空 | | AMU | NX | AIR MACAO | 1994 |

== Charter airlines ==
| Airline | Airline (in Chinese) | Image | Commenced operations |
|---|---|---|---|
| Jet Asia | 捷亞航空 | | 1995 |

== Cross-border Helicopter Service ==
| Airline | Airline (in Chinese) | Image | ICAO | IATA | Callsign | Commenced operations |
|---|---|---|---|---|---|---|
| Sky Shuttle Helicopters | 空中快線直升機 | | EMU | 3E | EAST ASIA | 1997 |

== See also ==
- List of defunct airlines of Asia – includes defunct airlines of Macau
- List of airports in Macau
