= LJ Air =

Chinese airline

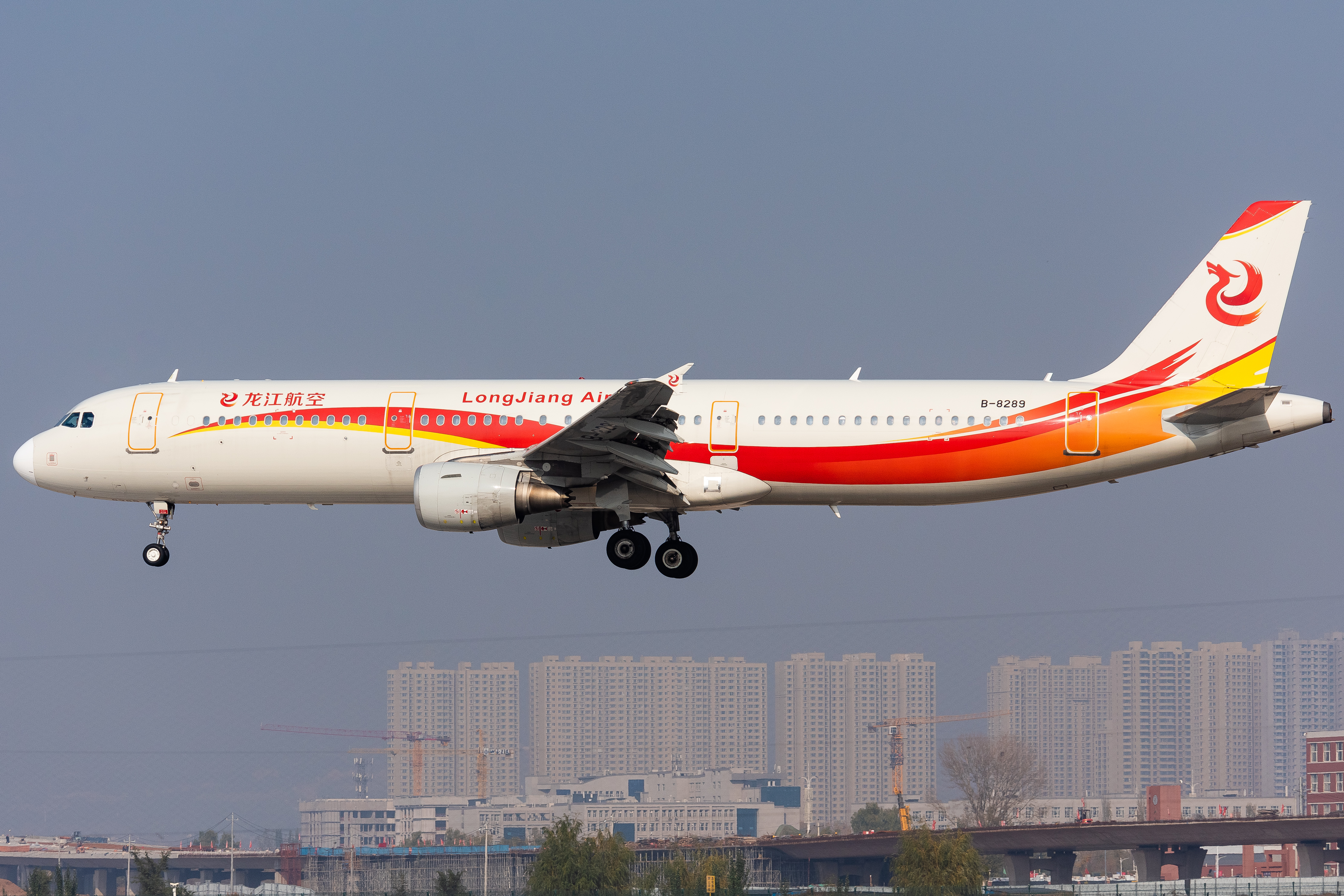
- LJ Air Airbus A321
IATA	ICAO	Call sign
LT	SNG	SNOW EAGLE
- Founded: 2014; 12 years ago
- Commenced operations: 10 February 2017; 9 years ago
- Hubs: Harbin Taiping International Airport Harbin
- Fleet size: 11
- Destinations: 5
- Headquarters: Harbin, China
- Key people: Liang Fuhua (owner)
- Website: www.longjianghk.com

LJ Air
- Simplified Chinese: 龙江航空
Transcriptions
Standard Mandarin
- Hanyu Pinyin: Lóngjiāng hángkōng

LJ Air or Longjiang Airlines Co.Ltd is a scheduled airline based at Harbin Taiping International Airport, Harbin, China. It commenced its first flight on 10 February 2017 from Harbin to Hefei. The airline earlier was scheduled to launch operations from June 2016 but it was delayed. It commenced services with two Airbus A321s. It received its AOC certificate in February 2017.

== History ==
LJ Air or Longjiang Airlines was founded in 2014 with its headquarters in Harbin, China. It was to start its operations in December 2015, but was delayed. The airline then wanted to start operations in June 2016 but again was delayed in receiving its AOC certificate, which it finally received in February 2017. It finally started operations on 10 February 2017, operating the flight between Harbin and Hefei with an Airbus A321. It currently has a fleet of one Airbus 320 and two Airbus A321s.

== Destinations ==
As of January 2020, LJ Air serves five destinations in China. It plans to open up new services to other destinations to China in the coming years.

Country	Destination	Airport	Notes	Refs
China	Chongqing	Chongqing Jiangbei International Airport		
China	Harbin	Harbin Taiping International Airport	Hub	
China	Hefei	Hefei Xinqiao International Airport		
China	Yinchuan	Yinchuan Hedong International Airport		
China	Zhuhai	Zhuhai Jinwan Airport		

== Fleet ==
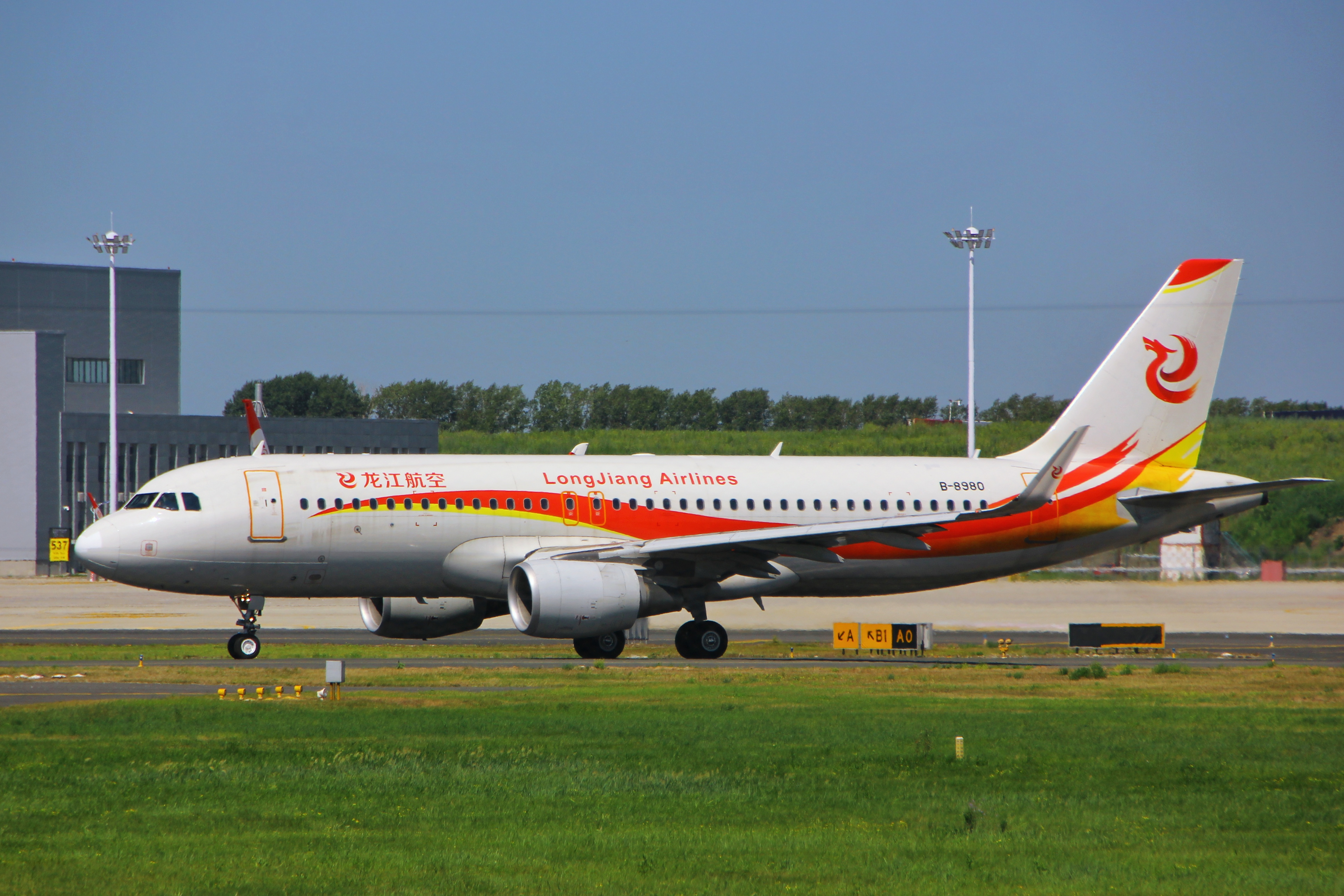
Longjiang Airlines Airbus A320-200

As of May 2026, the LJ Air fleet includes the following aircraft:

LJ Air fleet
Aircraft	In service	Orders	Passengers			Notes
Aircraft	In service	Orders	C	Y	Total	Notes
Airbus A320-200	8	–	–	180	180	
Airbus A321-200	3	–	8	182	190	
Total	11	–				

== See also ==
- List of airlines of China
