= List of airlines of Hong Kong =

This is a list of airlines which have a current Air Operator's Certificate issued by the Hong Kong Director-General of Civil Aviation (Traditional Chinese: 民航處處長), and for which oversight as recognised by the ICAO lies with the Civil Aviation Department. For airlines of Mainland China, Macau and Taiwan, see List of airlines of China, List of airlines of Macau, List of airlines of Taiwan.

== Full service airlines ==
Airline	Airline (in Chinese)	Image	ICAO	IATA	Callsign	Commenced operations	Notes
Cathay Pacific	國泰航空		CPA	CX	CATHAY	1946	Flag Carrier
Hong Kong Airlines	香港航空		CRK	HX	BAUHINIA	2006	Rebranded from CR Airways (中富航空) (2001–2006)

== Low-cost airlines ==
Airline	Airline (in Chinese)	Image	ICAO	IATA	Callsign	Commenced operations	Notes
Greater Bay Airlines	大灣區航空		HGB	HB	GREATER BAY	2022	Rebranded from Hong Kong Bauhinia Airlines (2019–2020) Rebranded from Donghai Airlines (Hong Kong) Limited (2019–2019); Rebranded from Donghai Airlines (2010–2019)
HK Express	香港快運航空		HKE	UO	HONGKONG SHUTTLE	2004	Rebranded from 港聯航空 (2004–2006); Subsidiary of Cathay Pacific

== Charter airlines ==
Airline	Airline (in Chinese)	Image	ICAO	IATA	Callsign	Commenced operations	Notes
Heliservices	直昇機服務（香港）					1978	
Hongkong Jet	香港商務航空		HKJ			2011	
Metrojet	美捷香港商用飛機		MTJ		METROJET	1995	
TAG Aviation Asia	TAG航空（亞洲）		TBJ		TAGJET	2006	

== Cross-border Helicopter Service ==
Airline	Airline (in Chinese)	Image	ICAO	IATA	Callsign	Commenced operations	Notes
Sky Shuttle	空中快線直升機		EMU	E3	EAST ASIA	1997	Rebranded from East Asia Helicopters (港聯直升機) (1997–2008); Subsidiary of Sociedade de Turismo e Diversões de Macau and Shun Tak Holdings

== Cargo airlines ==
Airline	Airline (in Chinese)	Image	ICAO	IATA	Callsign	Commenced operations	Notes
Air Hong Kong	香港華民航空		AHK	LD	AIR HONG KONG	1988	
Cathay Pacific Cargo	國泰航空公司		CPA	CX	CATHAY	1946	
Hong Kong Air Cargo	香港貨運航空		HKC	RH	MASCOT	2017	

== See also ==
- List of defunct airlines of Hong Kong
- List of airports in Hong Kong
- List of defunct airlines of Asia
- List of airlines of China
- List of airlines of Macau
