= List of defunct airlines of Hong Kong =

This is a list of defunct airlines of Hong Kong covering British Hong Kong and the special administrative region of China.

Airline	Image	IATA	ICAO	Callsign	Commenced operations	Ceased operations	Notes
CR Airways		N8	CRK		2001	2006	Rebranded as Hong Kong Airlines
Cathay Dragon		KA	HDA	DRAGON	2016	2020	Shut down due to effects of the COVID-19 pandemic
Dragonair		KA	HDA	DRAGON	1985	2016	Rebranded as Cathay Dragon
Hong Kong Airways					1947	1959	Formed with help from British Overseas Airways Corporation. Awarded routes north of Hong Kong in 1949 (along with Cathay Pacific obtaining routes south). Merged into Cathay Pacific on 30 June 1959, assets going to Malayan Airways.
Hong Kong Express		UO	HKE		2004	2013	Rebranded as HK Express
Jetstar Hong Kong		JM	JKT	KAITAK	2012	2015	Shut down due to loss of funding; name now used to promote Jetstar's sister companies
Oasis Hong Kong Airlines		O8	OHK	OASIS	2005	2008	Liquidated
Oriental Pearl Airways					1971	1973	

== See also ==
- List of airlines of Hong Kong
- List of airports in Hong Kong
