= Hongkong Jet =

Hong Kong-based airline

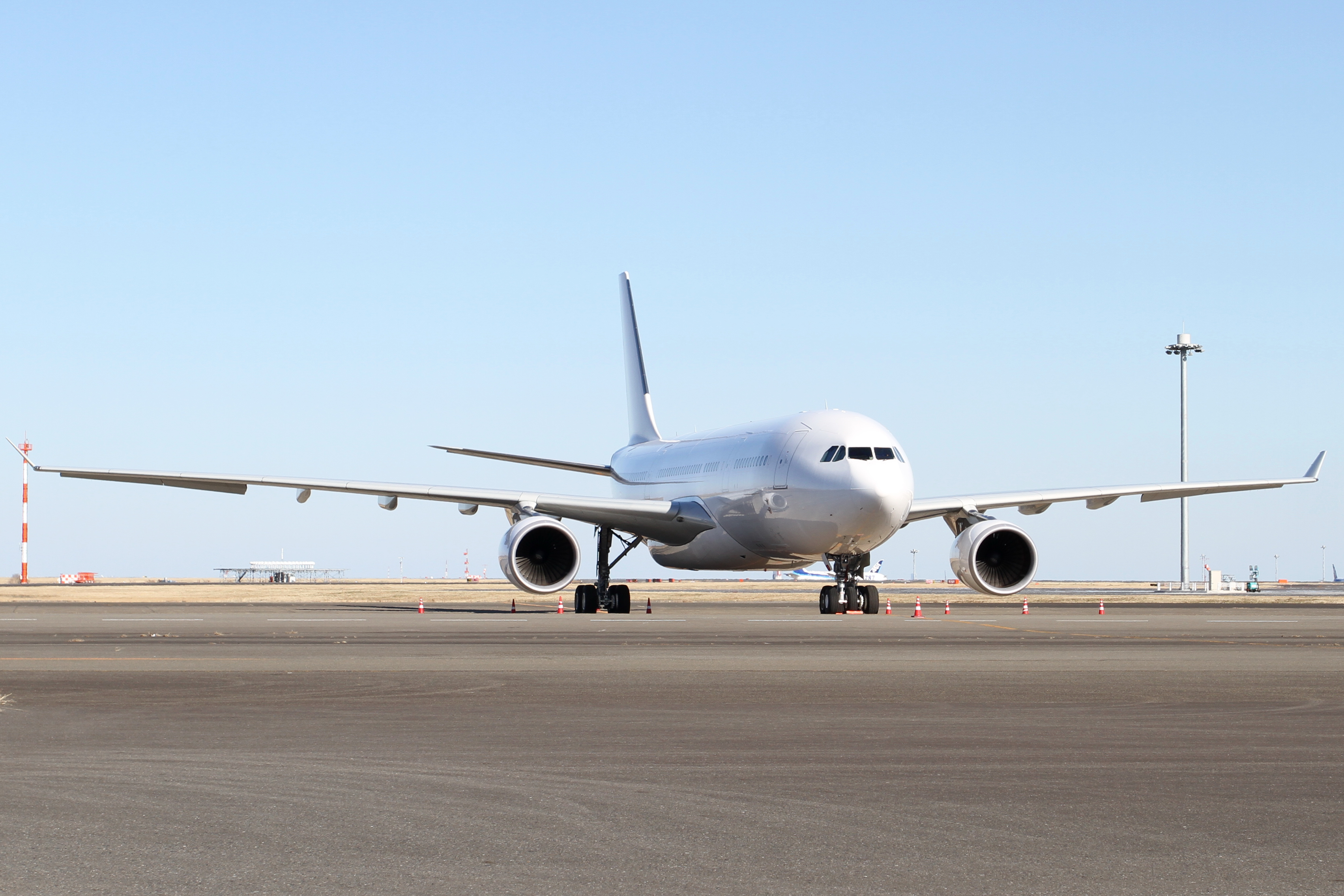
- Hongkong Jet's ACJ 330-200
IATA	ICAO	Call sign
-	HKJ	-
- Commenced operations: 2011 (15 years ago)
- Operating bases: Kuala Lumpur, Guernsey, Shanghai, Beijing & Dubai
- Hubs: Hong Kong
- Fleet size: 1
- Headquarters: Hong Kong
- Key people: Alex Jiao (CEO)
- Website: hongkongjet.com.hk

Hongkong Jet is a charter airline from Hong Kong. It commenced operations in 2011 and has its main hub at Hong Kong. Its fleet comprises one ACJ 318, two ACJ 319 and one ACJ 330-200 aircraft.

== Fleet ==
Hongkong Jet fleet
Aircraft	In fleet	Orders	Historic	Capacity	Notes
ACJ 330-202	1			VIP	
Total	1				

== See also ==
- List of airlines of Hong Kong
