= SKOGA =

Airline controlled by China and the Soviet Union

SKOGA 中蘇民航 СКОГА
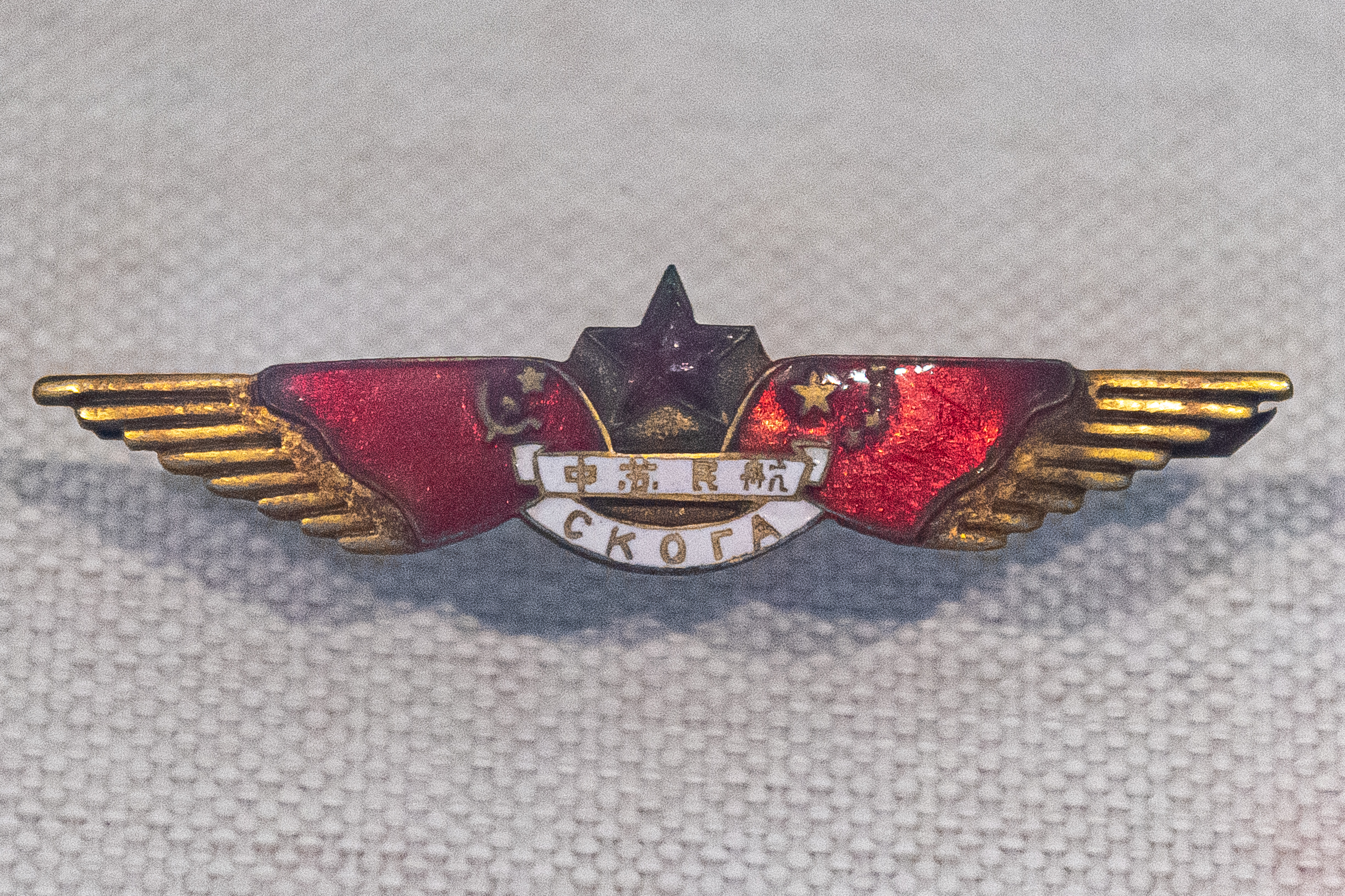
- Badge of SKOGA at the Civil Aviation Museum of China
IATA	ICAO	Call sign
-	-	SKOGA
- Founded: 1 July 1950
- Commenced operations: 1950
- Ceased operations: 1954
- Operating bases: Beijing Xijiao Airport
- Fleet size: Lisunov Li-2; Ilyushin Il-12
- Headquarters: Beijing, China

Cover of SKOGA Timetable and Rates publication of 1954

SKOGA was an airline jointly controlled by China and the Soviet Union, based in Beijing, China, which operated from 1950 to 1954. The name SKOGA (Russian: СКОГА) is the acronym of Sovyetsko-Kitaiskoe Obschestvo Grazhdanskoi Aviatsii (Soviet-Chinese Civil Aviation Company in Russian: Советско-Китайское общество гражданской авиации). The Chinese name was 中蘇民用航空股份公司 (simplified: 中苏民用航空股份公司; pinyin: zhōngsū mínháng gōngsī), translating to Sino-Soviet Civil Aviation Joint-Stock Company in English.

== History ==
On 2 November 1949, the Chinese and Soviet governments signed an agreement to establish a Sino-Soviet civil aviation joint-stock company, owned in equal share by each party. With a starting capital of 42 million Soviet rubles, the Chinese side provided airports, buildings, warehouses, and maintenance facilities. The Soviets contributed aircraft, communication equipment, transportation means, maintenance facilities and airports on Soviet territory. Management offices were set up in Beijing, Shenyang and Ürümqi.

SKOGA was formally established on 1 July 1950, immediately commencing services from Beijing to Chita via Shenyang, Harbin and Hailar, utilising Russian Lisunov Li-2 aircraft. This route was initially served once a week, the frequency later being increased to three services weekly, departing Beijing on Mondays, Wednesdays and Fridays, and returning from Chita on Tuesdays, Thursdays and Saturdays. Routes to Irkutsk and Almaty (in present-day Kazakhstan) were also added. From May 1952, Ilyushin Il-12 aircraft were operated.

On 12 October 1954, the Chinese and Soviet governments announced that from 1 January 1955, SKOGA would come completely under Chinese control. From this time, SKOGA ceased operations, and was superseded by the Civil Aviation Administration of China (CAAC) to handle Chinese air traffic.

== Destinations ==
According to a SKOGA timetable from 1954, the following destinations were served:

China

- Aksu
- Beijing
- Hailar
- Hami
- Harbin
- Jiuquan
- Kashgar
- Kuqa
- Lanzhou
- Qiqihar
- Shenyang
- Taiyuan
- Ürümqi
- Xi'an
- Yining

Mongolia

- Sainshand
- Ulaanbaatar

Soviet Union

- Almaty
- Chita
- Irkutsk
