= Grandstar Cargo =

Grandstar Cargo International Airlines Co., Ltd. 银河国际货运航空公司
| IATA | ICAO | Call sign |
|---|---|---|
| GD | GSC | GRANDSTAR CARGO |
- Founded: 2008
- Ceased operations: 2012
- Hubs: Tianjin Binhai International Airport
- Fleet size: 1
- Destinations: 3
- Parent company: Sinotrans (51%), Korean Air (25%), Hana Capital Co. (13%), and Shinhan Capital Co., Ltd. (11%).
- Headquarters: Tianjin, China
- Key people: Kwang-Sa Lee (CEO)
- Website: http://www.grandstarcargo.com/

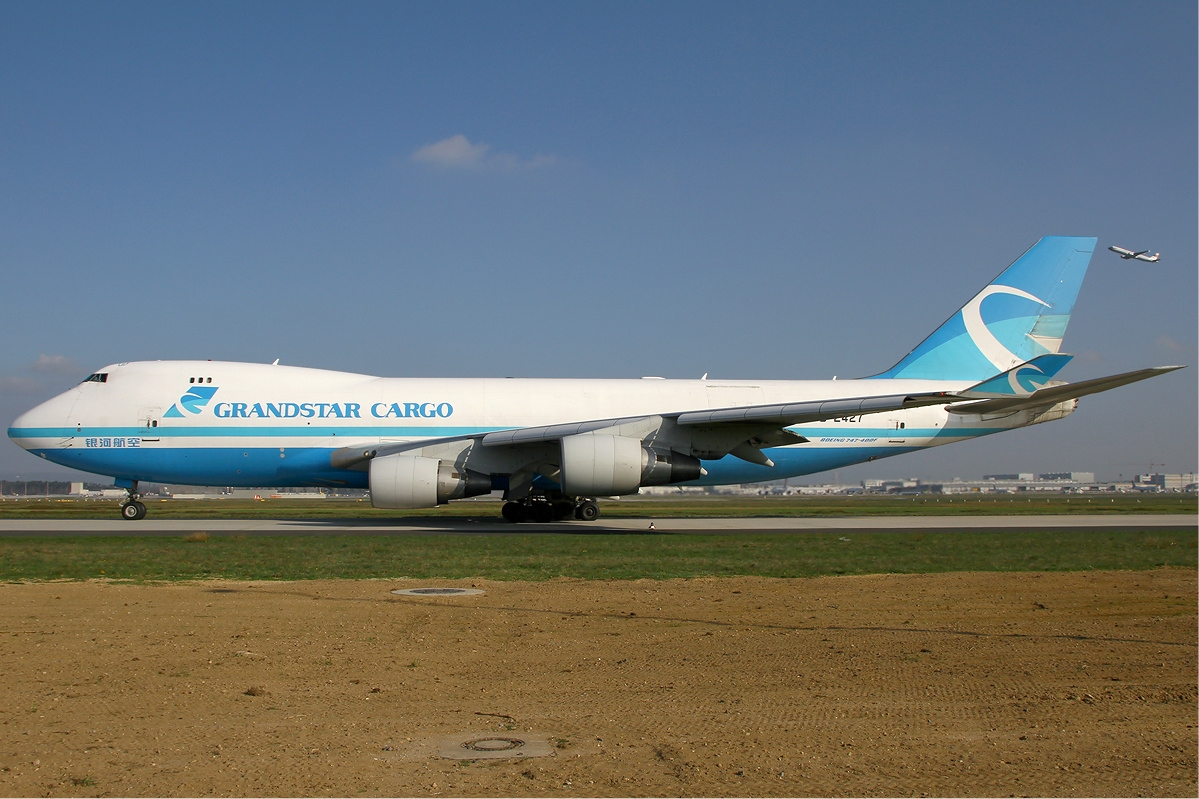
Grandstar Cargo Boeing 747-400F at Frankfurt Airport

Grandstar Cargo International Airlines Company (Chinese: 银河国际货运航空公司) was a cargo airline based in Tianjin, China. It was a joint venture between Sinotrans Air transportation Development Company and Korean Air Cargo. It planned to operate scheduled and non-scheduled international cargo flights to Europe, America, and Asia.

The airline was founded in 2008 and ended operations in May 2012.

Grandstar Cargo had served Frankfurt, Shanghai and Seoul from Tianjin.

They operated a single Boeing 747-400F/SCD.
