= Wang Changshun =

Chinese business executive (born 1957)

- 王昌顺
- Born: 1957 (age 68–69); Shaanxi Province
- Education: University of Science and Technology of China
- Occupation: Chairman of China Southern Airlines
- Employer: China Southern Airlines

Wang Changshun (Chinese: 王昌顺; born 1957) is a Chinese business executive who is the chairman of the board for China Southern Airlines as of 2017. Concurrently, he serves as general manager of the China National Aviation Holding Company (CNAHC), and the vice chairman of the board at China National Aviation Corporation. Previously he worked for various regulatory agencies, including Air China and the Civil Aviation Administration of China.

Wang born in Shaanxi Province in July 1957. He graduated from the University of Science and Technology of China with a Ph.D. in management science and engineering. He began working in civil aviation in February 1976, working primarily in air traffic control. He later served as deputy general manager of China Xinjiang Airlines. From 2000 to 2004, he worked at China Southern Airlines, serving as general manager, deputy general manager, and vice chairman of the board. From 2004 to 2008, he worked as a deputy director of the General Administration of Civil Aviation of China (later renamed as the Civil Aviation Administration). From 2008 to 2011, Wang worked as deputy director of the Civil Aviation Administration and chairman of the National Labour Union of Civil Aviation. Since 2011, he worked with CNAHC. He was also appointed president of Air China that year.

In January 2012, Wang was selected as the new chairman of Air China by its shareholders after Kong Dong retired. In an October 2012 interview, Wang said that information technology was a "particular focus" for him in his leadership position at Air China because it offered opportunities to improve operating control and "key performance indicators".

Wang has also been the Secretary of Communist Party Committee and Deputy Director of Xin Jiang Regional Administration. He was selected to serve as president of the 68th (2012) Annual General Meeting (AGM) International Air Transport Association (IATA) and World Air Transport Summit, held in Beijing. He presided over the meeting, which had record attendance by 750 delegates and 350 representatives of the news media.
