= Greater Bay Airlines =

Hong Kong-based low-cost airline

Greater Bay Airlines 大灣區航空

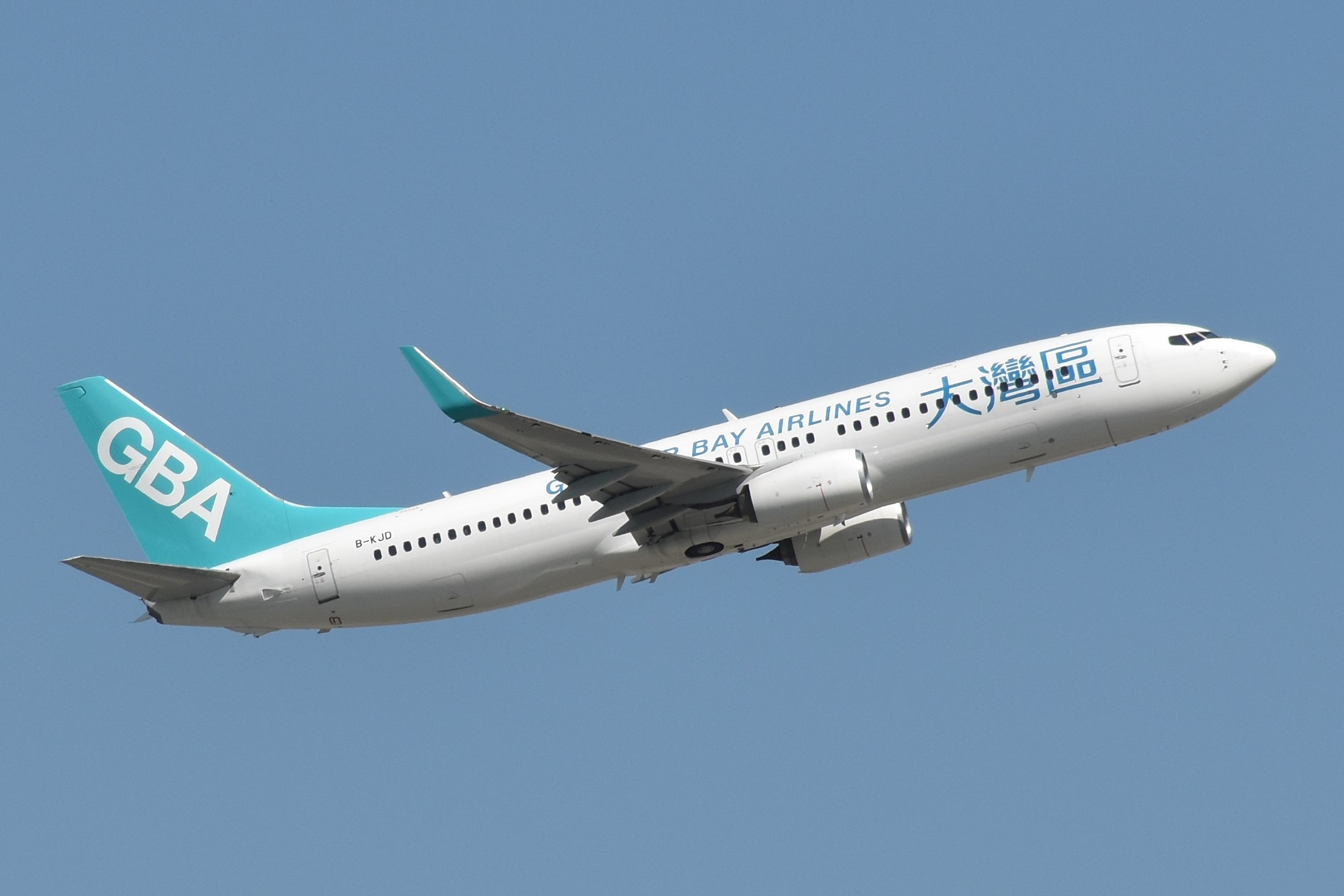
- A Greater Bay Airlines Boeing 737-800
IATA	ICAO	Call sign
HB	HGB	GREATER BAY
- Founded: 24 May 2010; 16 years ago (as Donghai Airlines); 8 July 2020; 6 years ago (as Greater Bay Airlines)
- Commenced operations: 23 July 2022; 4 years ago
- AOC #: 19
- Hubs: Hong Kong International Airport
- Fleet size: 8
- Destinations: 24
- Parent company: East Pacific (Holdings) Ltd
- Headquarters: 12/F, One Citygate, 20 Tat Tung Road, Tung Chung, Lantau, Hong Kong
- Key people: Liza Ng Shiow Lan (CEO); Bill Wong Cho-bau, JP (Chairman)
- Founders: Bill Wong Cho-bau
- Website: www.greaterbay-airlines.com

Greater Bay Airlines
- Traditional Chinese: 大灣區航空公司
- Simplified Chinese: 大湾区航空公司
Transcriptions
Standard Mandarin
- Hanyu Pinyin: Dà Wān Qū Hángkōng Gōngsī
Yue: Cantonese
- Jyutping: daai6 waan1 keoi1 hong4 hung1 gung1 si1

Greater Bay Airlines Company Limited (GBA), commonly known as Greater Bay Airlines (Chinese: 大灣區航空公司), is a Hong Kong–based carrier established in 2020. The company's inaugural passenger flight (from Hong Kong to Bangkok) was conducted in July 2022.

Its head office is in One Citygate in Tung Chung.

== History ==
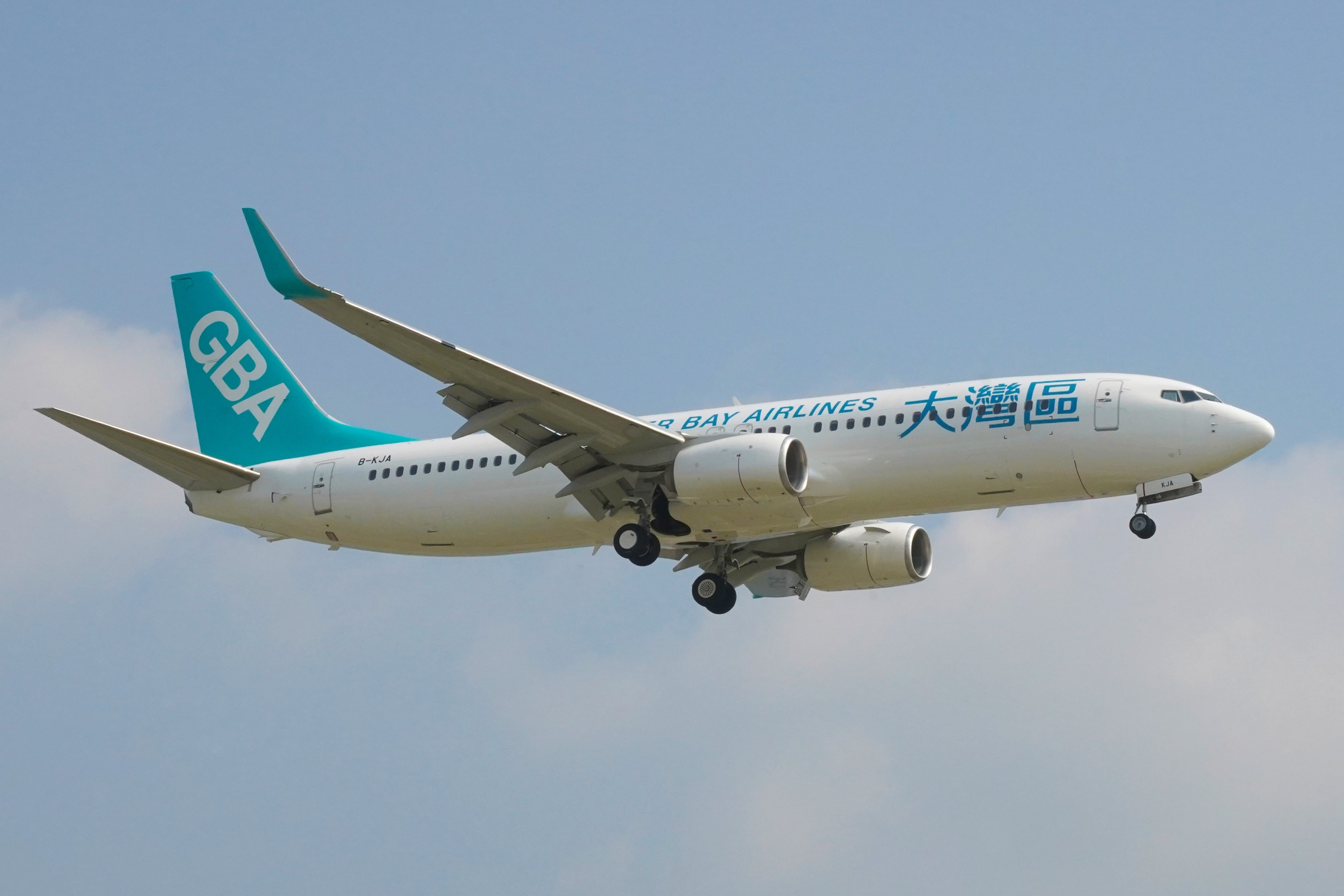
Boeing 737-800

Greater Bay Airlines was founded on May 24, 2010, as a subsidiary of East Pacific (Holdings) Ltd., initially known as Donghai Airlines. The company went through several name changes, becoming Donghai Airlines (Hong Kong) Limited on January 17, 2019, then Hong Kong Bauhinia Airlines on December 5, 2019, and finally Greater Bay Airlines on July 8, 2020.

During the certification process, the airline faced delays due to concerns raised by competitors Cathay Pacific, HK Express and Hong Kong Airlines. However, by February 2021, these concerns were addressed, and the airlines submitted position statements instead of objections to Greater Bay Airlines' application.

Due to COVID-19 travel restrictions, Greater Bay Airlines initially focused on cargo services. In September 2021, Greater Bay Airlines received its first aircraft, an ex-Norwegian Air International 2017-build Boeing 737-800 leased from the company ICBC Financial Leasing. It obtained its Air Operator's Certificate in October 2021 and began charter flights in November the same year. Its first charter flight, on 29 November 2021, was a same-day round trip from Hong Kong to Bangkok.

In February 2022, the airline was granted the Air Transport License of Hong Kong, allowing it to operate scheduled flights. A second aircraft was leased in March 2022, deviating from the original plan of seven aircraft.

Greater Bay Airlines launched its first passenger flight from Hong Kong to Bangkok in July 2022. As of February 2024, the airline operates scheduled services to seven destinations: Manila, Bangkok, Taipei, Tokyo, Seoul, Singapore and Osaka.

== Senior leadership ==
The airline has been chaired by founder Bill Wong since its founding in 2010. The current CEO is Hou Wei, who replaced Stanley Hui and Liza Ng in 2025.

=== List of CEOs ===
1. Algernon Yau (2021–2022)
2. Stanley Hui (2022–2024)
3. Liza Ng (2024–2025)
4. Hou Wei (since June 2025)

== Destinations ==
These destinations are currently served by Greater Bay Airlines.

Country/Region	City	Airport	Notes	Refs
China	Datong	Datong Yungang International Airport		
China	Enshi	Enshi Xujiaping International Airport	Seasonal	
China	Guilin	Guilin Liangjiang International Airport		
China	Haikou	Haikou Meilan International Airport	Terminated	
China	Huangshan	Huangshan Tunxi International Airport		
China	Kunming	Kunming Changshui Airport		
China	Quanzhou	Quanzhou Jinjiang International Airport		
China	Wuhan	Wuhan Tianhe International Airport	Seasonal	
China	Xuzhou	Xuzhou Guanyin International Airport		
China	Yichang	Yichang Sanxia Airport		
China	Zhangjiajie	Zhangjiajie Hehua International Airport		
China	Zhoushan	Zhoushan Putuoshan Airport		
Hong Kong	Hong Kong	Hong Kong International Airport	Hub	
Indonesia	Surabaya	Juanda International Airport		
Japan	Fukuoka	Fukuoka Airport		
Japan	Osaka	Kansai International Airport		
Japan	Sapporo	New Chitose Airport		
Japan	Sendai	Sendai Airport		
Japan	Tokushima	Tokushima Airport	Terminated	
Japan	Tokyo	Narita International Airport		
Japan	Yonago	Yonago Kitaro Airport	Terminated	
Malaysia	Tawau	Tawau Airport	Seasonal	
Maldives	Malé	Velana International Airport	Seasonal	
Philippines	Manila	Ninoy Aquino International Airport		
Singapore	Singapore	Changi Airport	Terminated	
South Korea	Seoul	Incheon International Airport	Terminated	
Taiwan	Taipei	Taoyuan International Airport		
Thailand	Bangkok	Suvarnabhumi Airport		
Vietnam	Da Nang	Da Nang International Airport	Seasonal	
Vietnam	Ho Chi Minh City	Tan Son Nhat International Airport	Terminated	
Vietnam	Phu Quoc	Phu Quoc International Airport		

=== Codeshare partners ===
Greater Bay Airlines has codeshare agreements with the following airlines:

- Chu Kong Passenger Transport (ferry)

== Fleet ==
=== Current fleet ===
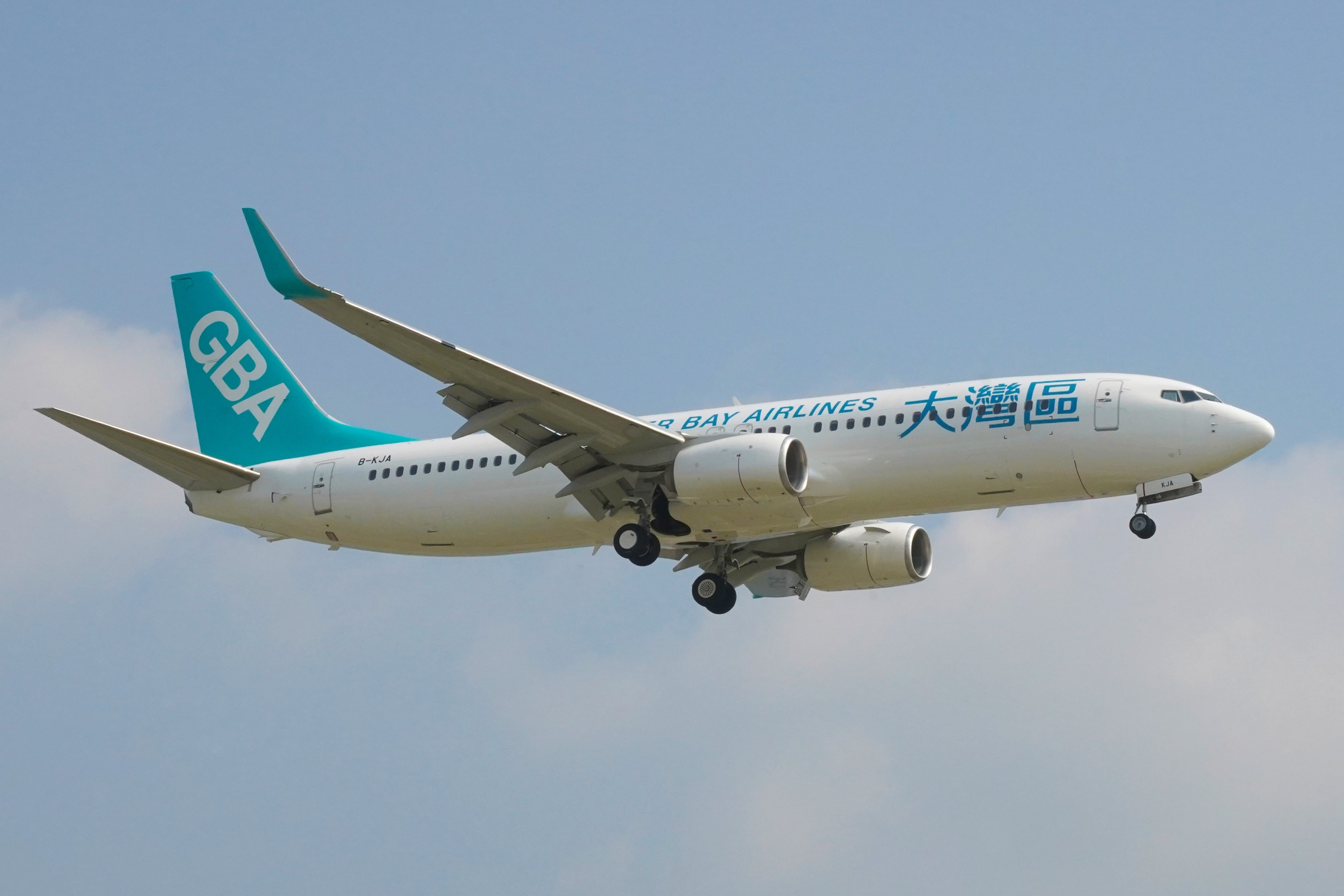
Boeing 737-800

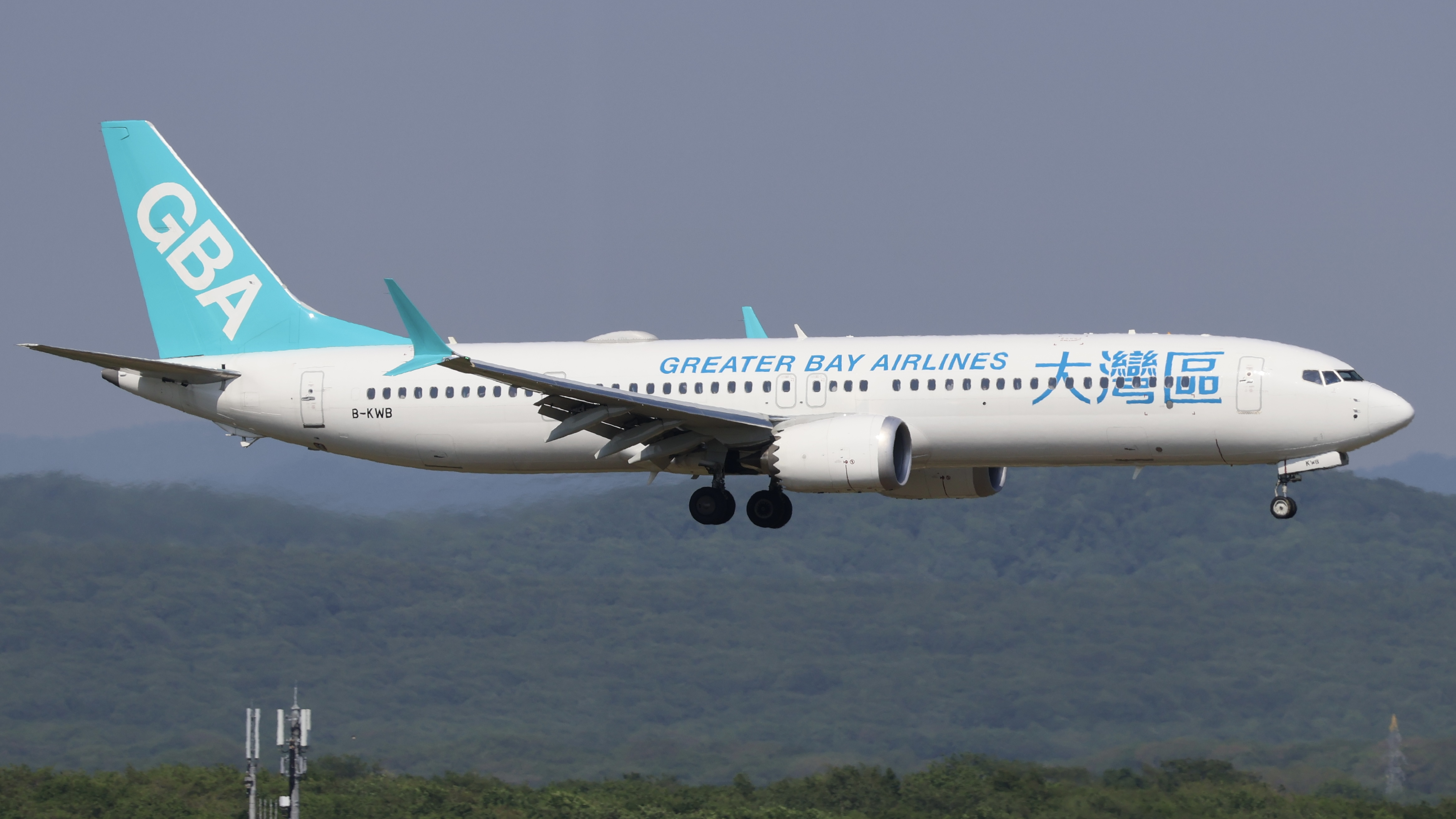
Boeing 737 MAX 9

As of July 2026, Greater Bay Airlines operates the following aircraft:

Greater Bay Airlines fleet
Aircraft	In service	Orders	Passengers			Notes
Aircraft	In service	Orders	W	Y	Total	Notes
Boeing 737-800	6	—	—	189	189	3 leased from ICBC Leasing
Boeing 737-800	6	—	—	186	186	3 leased from ICBC Leasing
Boeing 737 MAX 9	2	13	8	189	197	Deliveries until 2030
Total	8	13				

=== Former fleet ===
As of August 2025, Greater Bay Airlines operated 6 Boeing 737-800 and 2 Boeing 737-9 MAX.

Aircraft	Total	Introduced	Retired
Boeing 737-800	2	2021	Ongoing

== See also ==
- Donghai Airlines
- List of airlines of Hong Kong
