= Hebei Airlines =

Chinese airline

Hebei Airlines 河北航空公司 Héběi Hángkōng Gōngsī

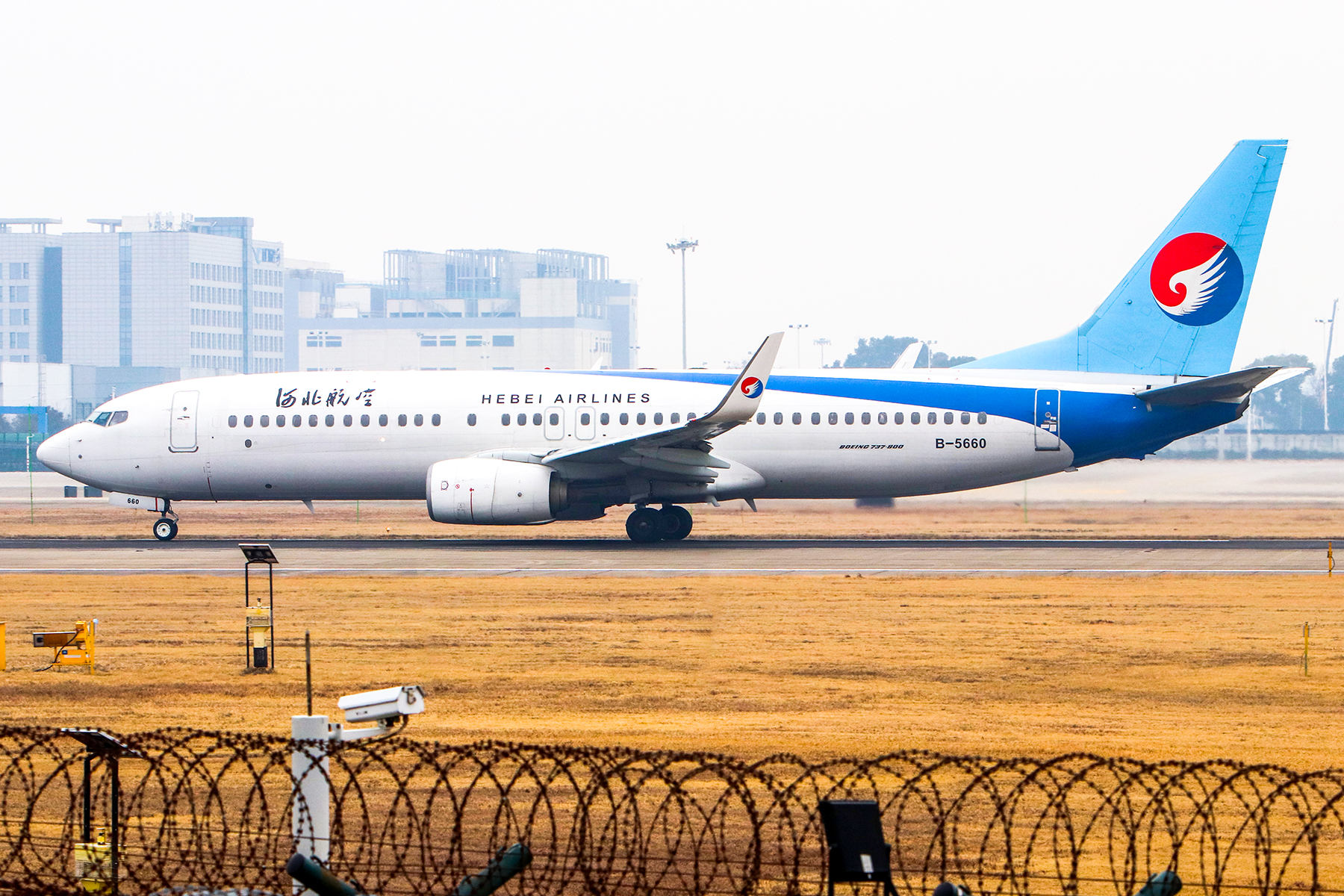
IATA	ICAO	Call sign
NS	HBH	HEBEI AIR
- Founded: 2006; 20 years ago (as Northeast Airlines)
- Commenced operations: 29 June 2010; 16 years ago (as Hebei Airlines)
- Hubs: Shijiazhuang Zhengding International Airport
- Focus cities: Beijing Daxing International Airport
- Frequent-flyer program: Hebei Eagle Club
- Fleet size: 28
- Destinations: 27
- Parent company: XiamenAir
- Headquarters: Shijiazhuang, Hebei, China
- Website: www.hbhk.com.cn

Hebei Airlines (河北航空公司 Héběi Hángkōng gōngsī) is a Chinese airline which has its corporate headquarters in the Shijiazhuang World Trade Plaza Hotel (S: 石家庄世贸广场酒店, T: 石家莊世貿廣場酒店, P: Shíjiāzhuāng Shìmào Guǎngchǎng Jiǔdiàn) in Chang'an District, Shijiazhuang, Hebei Province.

== History ==
The airline was formerly known as Northeast Airlines; it re-branded itself as Hebei Airlines in 2010. It commenced operations on June 29, 2010.

== Destinations ==
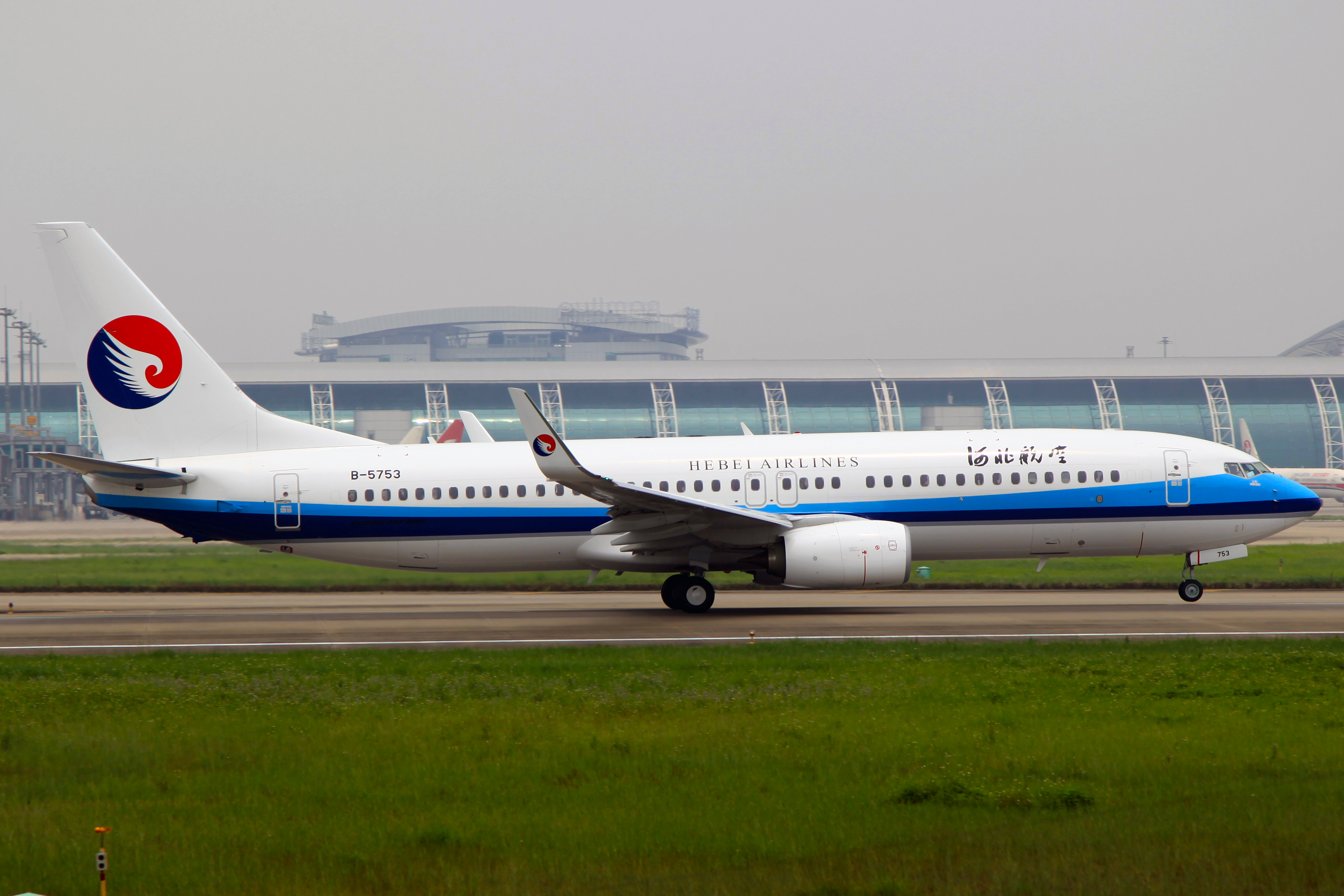
Hebei Airlines Boeing 737-800

As of March 2017, Hebei Airlines serves 27 destinations in China. The airline's debut international flight was on 27 March 2017 with three-times weekly service to Bangkok–Suvarnabhumi.

On 29 October 2017, the airline launched flights to Singapore.

=== Codeshare agreements ===
Hebei Airlines has codeshare agreements with the following airlines:

- China Southern Airlines
- XiamenAir

== Fleet ==
As of August 2025, Hebei Airlines operates the following aircraft:

Hebei Airlines fleet
Aircraft	In service	Orders	Passengers			Notes
Aircraft	In service	Orders	J	Y	Total	Notes
Boeing 737-800	28	—	8	162	170	
Boeing 737-800	28	—	—	184	184	
Comac C919	—	20	TBA			
Total	27	20				
