= Civil Aviation Administration of China =

Government agency for civil aviation in China

- 中国民用航空局
- Emblem of the Civil Aviation Administration of China

- National emblem of China

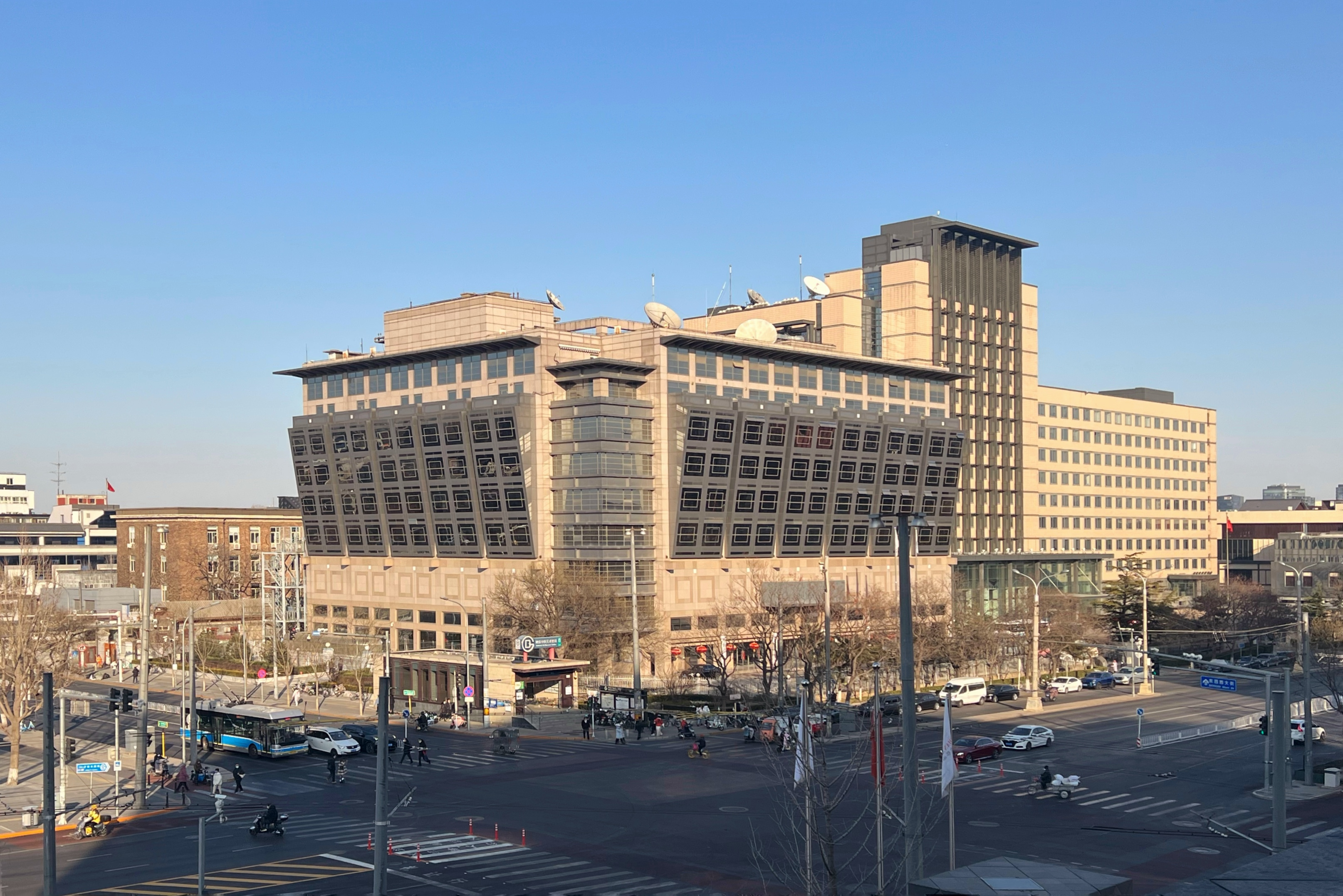
- CAAC headquarters in Beijing

Agency overview
- Formed: 1949; 77 years ago
- Jurisdiction: China
- Headquarters: Dongcheng, Beijing
- Agency executive: Song Zhiyong, Administrator
- Parent agency: Ministry of Transport
- Website: caac.gov.cn

Civil Aviation Administration of China
- Simplified Chinese: 中国民用航空局
- Traditional Chinese: 中國民用航空局
Transcriptions
Standard Mandarin
- Hanyu Pinyin: Zhōngguó mínyòng hángkōngjú
Yue: Cantonese
- Jyutping: zung^{1}gwok^{3}man^{4} jung^{6} hong^{4}hung^{1} guk^{6}

Abbreviation
- Simplified Chinese: 中国民航
- Traditional Chinese: 中國民航
Transcriptions
Standard Mandarin
- Hanyu Pinyin: Zhōngguó mínháng
Yue: Cantonese
- Jyutping: zung^{1}gwok^{3} man^{4}hong^{4}

Further abbreviation
- Chinese: 民航
Transcriptions
Standard Mandarin
- Hanyu Pinyin: Mínháng
Yue: Cantonese
- Jyutping: man^{4}hong^{4}

The Civil Aviation Administration of China (CAAC) is the civil aviation authority of China, operating under the Ministry of Transport. It oversees civil aviation and investigates aviation accidents and incidents. It is headquartered in Dongcheng, Beijing.

Before Deng Xiaoping's reform of separation of government and enterprise, the agency operated the CAAC Airlines with monopoly status from 1953 to 1987.

== History ==
On 2 November 1949, a month after the proclamation of the People's Republic of China, the CCP Central Committee decided to found the Civil Aviation Agency under the name of the People's Revolutionary Military Commission, and under the command of the People's Liberation Army Air Force, to manage all non-military aviation in the country, as well as provide general and commercial flight services. The Civil Aviation Agency was created in December of the same year, and established offices in Chongqing, Guangzhou, Shanghai, Tianjin, and Wuhan. On 10 March 1950, the Guangzhou Office began to work, managing civil flight services in Guangdong, Guangxi, and Hunan. Later, it was merged with Wuhan Office to form the Civil Aviation Office of Central and Southern China on 21 January 1951, in Guangzhou, it was renamed Central and Southern Civil Aviation Office, working for civil flight administrations in Guangdong, Guangxi, Hubei, and Hunan.

On 7 May 1952, the People's Revolutionary Military Commission and the State Council issued the Decision for Reorganizing Civil Aviation (Chinese: 关于整编民用航空的决定) and the Civil Aviation Agency of the People's Revolutionary Military Commission was transferred to the military system and was under the direct control of the PLA Air Force, then split the civil aviation administration division and airline division to form the separate Civil Aviation Agency and civil airline. Under this decision, from July to November 1951, the Civil Aviation Agency had four administration offices in Shanghai (Eastern China), Guangzhou (Central-Southern), Chongqing (Southwestern China), and Tianjin (Northern China). The Southern China branch was briefly renamed the Civil Aviation Administration Office of Southern China. On 17 July 1952, the People's Aviation Company of China was created, headquartered in Tianjin.

On 9 June 1953, following Aeroflot in the Soviet Union, the People's Aviation Company of China was merged with the Civil Aviation Agency of the Central Revolutionary Military Commission, and domestic services were continued under the name 'Civil Aviation' (Chinese: 民用航空). Later, the SKOGA was merged with the Beijing administration office on 1 January 1955.

In November 1954, the Civil Aviation Agency of the People's Revolutionary Military Commission was renamed Civil Aviation Agency of China. It was transferred to the State Council and came under the leadership of both State Council and PLA Air Force. The PLA Air Force was also responsible for technical, flight, aircrew, communicating, human resources, and political works. After the merger with SKOGA, the new airline continued to operate under the name 'Civil Aviation' until early 1957 before changing its operating name to CAAC (Chinese: 中国民航).

On 27 February 1958, the Civil Aviation Agency was transferred to the Ministry of Transport. Later, the Agency ratified the Report for the Opinions of System Devolving (Chinese: 关于体制下放意见的报告) from the party branch of the Ministry of Transport in 17 June. Both national and local authorities have responsibilities of civil aviation. International and main domestic flights were mainly under the leadership of the national authority while local and agricultural flights were mainly under the leadership of local authority. Thus, most provinces and autonomous regions established their own civil aviation administration offices. Five administration offices in Beijing, Chengdu, Guangzhou, Shanghai, Tianjin, and Ürümqi were changed to be regional administration agencies in 13 December. The Agency was renamed the General Administration of Civil Aviation of the Ministry of Transport on 17 November 1960.

In April 1962, the Presidium of the 2nd National People's Congress decided to rename the General Administration of Civil Aviation of the Ministry of Transport to the General Administration of Civil Aviation of China on the 53rd meeting. It was transferred to the State Council and was managed by the PLA Air Force. The General Administration of Civil Aviation was transferred to the PLA Air Force on 20 November 1969.

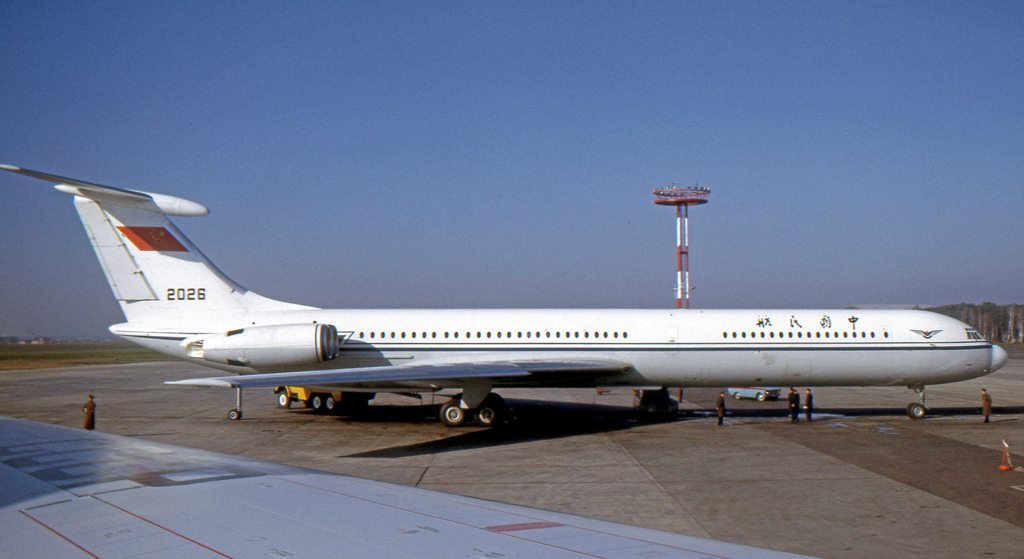
CAAC Ilyushin Il-62 at Moscow Sheremetyevo Airport in 1974

In 1963, China purchased six Vickers Viscount aircraft from Great Britain, followed in 1971 by the purchase of four Hawker Siddeley Trident aircraft from Pakistan International Airlines. In August 1971, the airline purchased six Trident 2Es directly from Hawker Siddeley. The country also placed provisional orders for three Concorde aircraft. With the 1972 Nixon visit to China, the country ordered 10 Boeing 707 jets. In December 1973, it took the unprecedented step of borrowing £40 million from Western banks to fund the purchase of 15 additional Trident jets. Soviet-built Ilyushin Il-62 aircraft were used on long range routes during the 1970s and 1980s.

On 5 March 1980, the General Administration of Civil Aviation was no longer managed by the PLA Air Force, and was transferred to the State Council. Some administrative works were still under the People's Liberation Army and the air controlling was managed by PLA General Stuff Department and Air Force Command.

On 30 January 1987, the State Council ratified the Report for the Reform Solution and Executive Steps of the Civil Aviation System Administration System (Chinese: 关于民航系统管理体制改革方案和实施步骤的报告). Since then, CAAC acted solely as a government agency and reorganized six regional administration agencies, and no longer provided commercial flight services. In 1988, the airline CAAC was divided into a number of individual air carriers, many of them named after the region of China where it had its hub.

On 19 April 1993, the General Administration of Civil Aviation was elevated to a ministry-level agency of the State Council.

In March 2008, CAAC was made a subsidiary of the newly created Ministry of Transport, and its official Chinese name was slightly adjusted to reflect its being no longer a ministry-level agency. Its official English name has remained Civil Aviation Administration of China.

On 11 March 2019, the CAAC was the first civil aviation authority to ground the Boeing 737 MAX. Following its decision, most of the world's aviation authorities grounded the MAX, including the European Union Aviation Safety Agency the next day. It took the US Federal Aviation Administration until 13 March to ground the MAX. Aviation commentators saw this as having bolstered the global reputation of the CAAC at the expense of the FAA. After the MAX was cleared to return by the FAA in November 2020, the CAAC reiterated that there "is no set timetable" to lifting the MAX grounding in China. In early August 2021, a MAX made a test flight in Shanghai for validation. Later, the CAAC issued an airworthiness directive on 2 December to allow the type return to service if the MCAS is corrected following Boeing's instructions.

== Current role ==
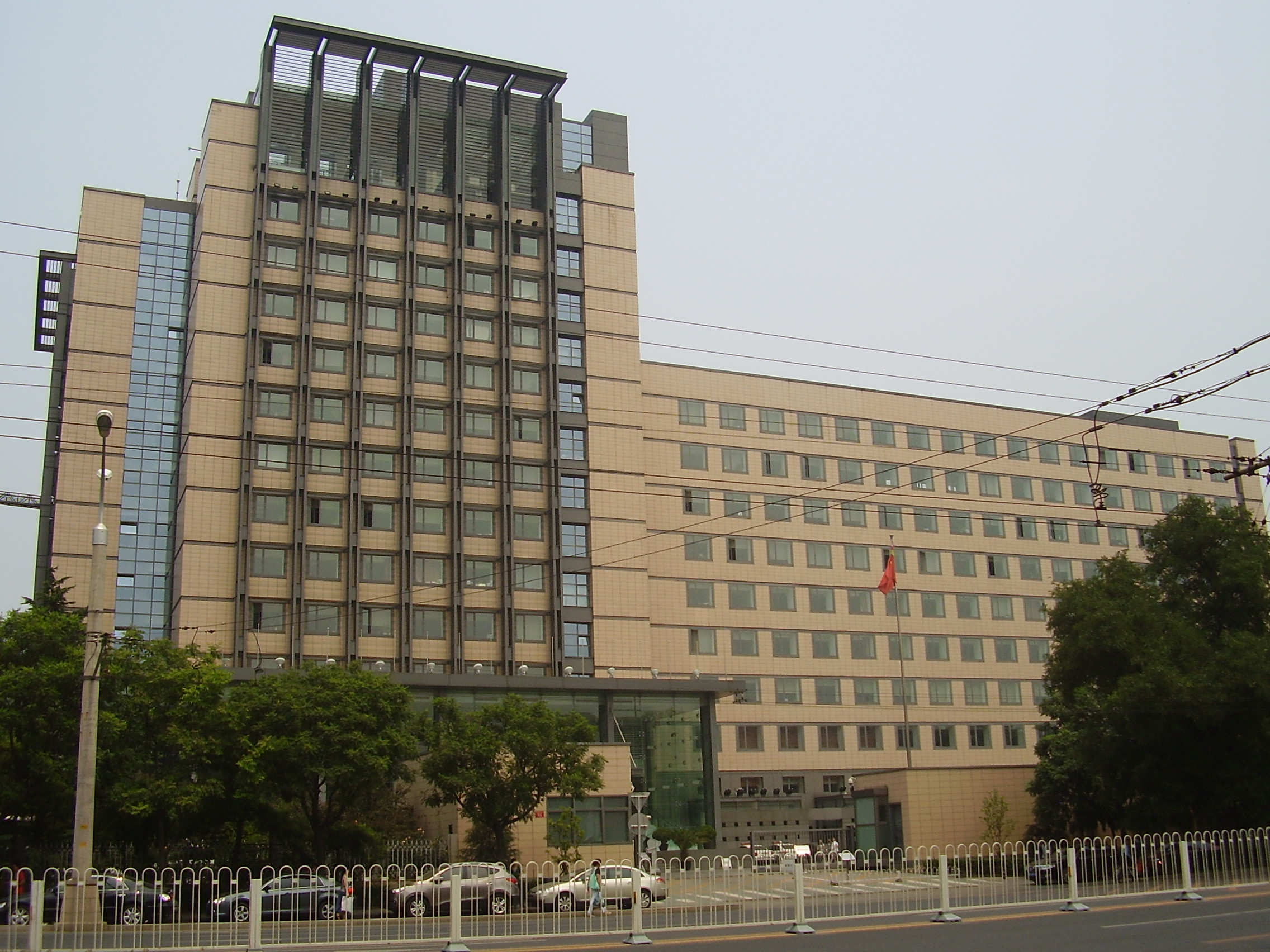
CAAC headquarters

Currently, CAAC is an administrative department mostly intended to supervise the civil aviation market. CAAC releases route applications every week and for routes that do not fly to an open-sky country/region, there will be monthly scoring releases that determine the score for each of them. CAAC subsequently grants permission to start on those who score highest on the list.

CAAC administers China's no-fly list.

== List of directors ==
List of Directors of the Civil Aviation Administration of China:

Name	Chinese name	Took office	Left office
Zhong Chibing	钟赤兵	November 1949	October 1952
Zhu Huizhao	朱辉照	October 1952	June 1955
Kuang Rennong	邝任农	June 1955	June 1973
Ma Renhui	马仁辉	June 1973	June 1975
Liu Cunxin	刘存信	June 1975	December 1977
Shen Tu	沈图	December 1977	March 1985
Hu Yizhou	胡逸洲	March 1985	February 1991
Jiang Zhuping	蒋祝平	February 1991	December 1993
Chen Guangyi	陈光毅	December 1993	June 1998
Liu Jianfeng	刘剑锋	June 1998	June 1998
Yang Yuanyuan	杨元元	May 2002	December 2007
Li Jiaxiang	李家祥	December 2007	January 2016
Feng Zhenglin	冯正霖	January 2016	July 2022
Song Zhiyong	宋志勇	July 2022	Incumbent

== Affiliate subsidiaries ==
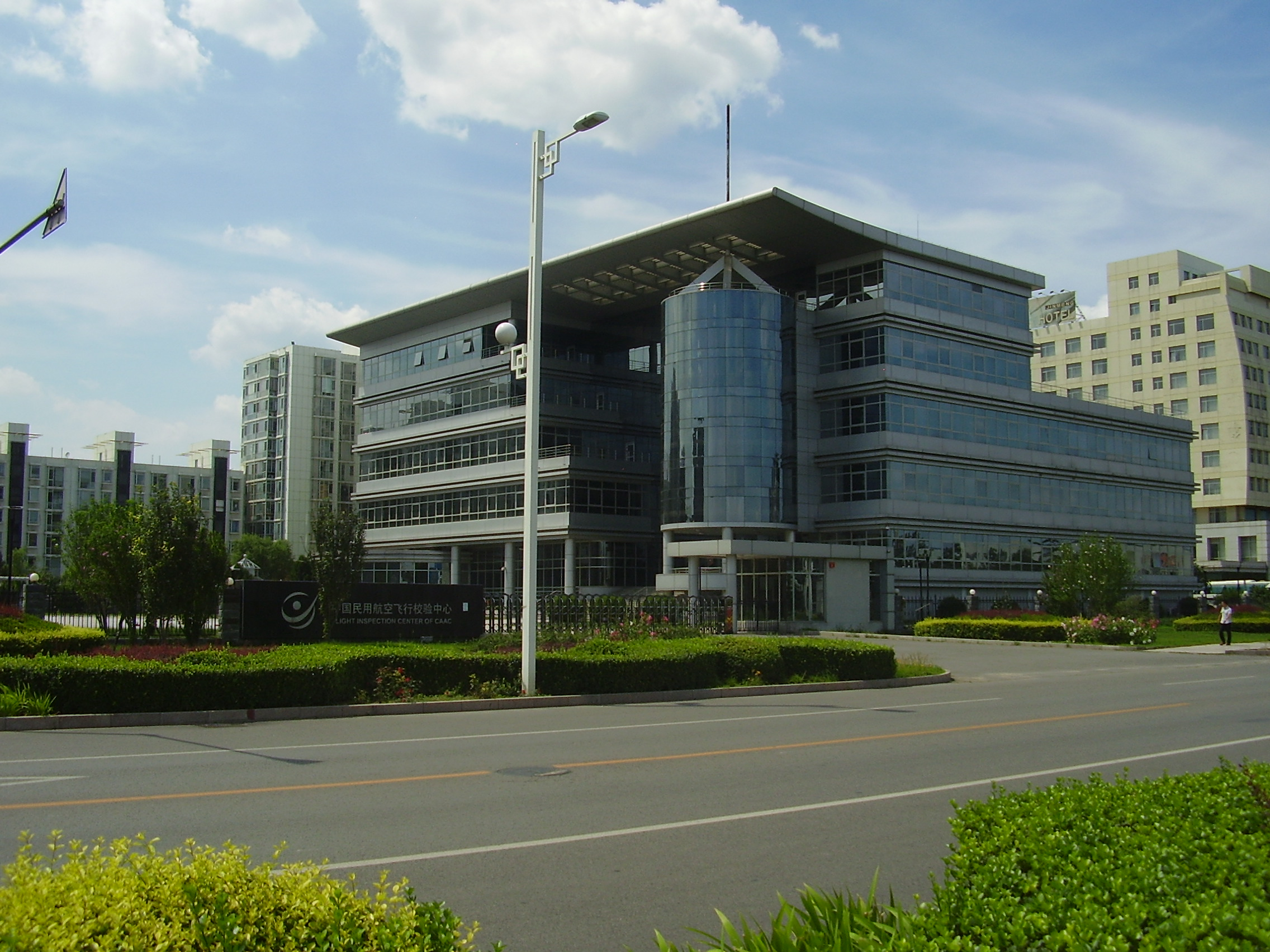
Flight Inspection Center of CAAC

- Air Traffic Administration Bureau (ATMB) in Beijing
- Civil Aviation University of China (CAUC) in Tianjin
- Civil Aviation Flight University of China (CAFUC) in Guanghan
- Civil Aviation Management Institute of China (CAMIC) in Beijing
- China Academy of Civil Aviation Science and Technology — Center of Aviation Safety Technology, CAAC in Beijing
- CAAC Second Research Institute in Chengdu
- China Civil Aviation Publishing Press in Beijing
- Civil Aviation Medical Center — Civil Aviation General Hospital in Beijing
- CAAC Settlement Center in Beijing
- CAAC Information Center in Beijing
- CAAC Audition Center in Beijing
- Capital Airports Holdings Limited (CAH) in Beijing
- CAAC International Cooperation and Service Center in Beijing
- China Airport Construction Corporation (CACC) in Beijing
- China Civil Aviation Engine Airworthiness Audition Center
- Flight Inspection Center of CAAC in Beijing
- CAAC Museum

== See also ==
- Transport in the People's Republic of China
- List of airports in the People's Republic of China
- China's busiest airports by passenger traffic
- List of airlines of the People's Republic of China
- Civil aviation in China
- Civil Aviation Department (Hong Kong)
- Civil Aviation Authority (Macau)
- Civil Aviation Administration (Taiwan)
- CAAC (Airline)
