= China Eastern Airlines =

Chinese airline

China Eastern Airlines 中国东方航空公司

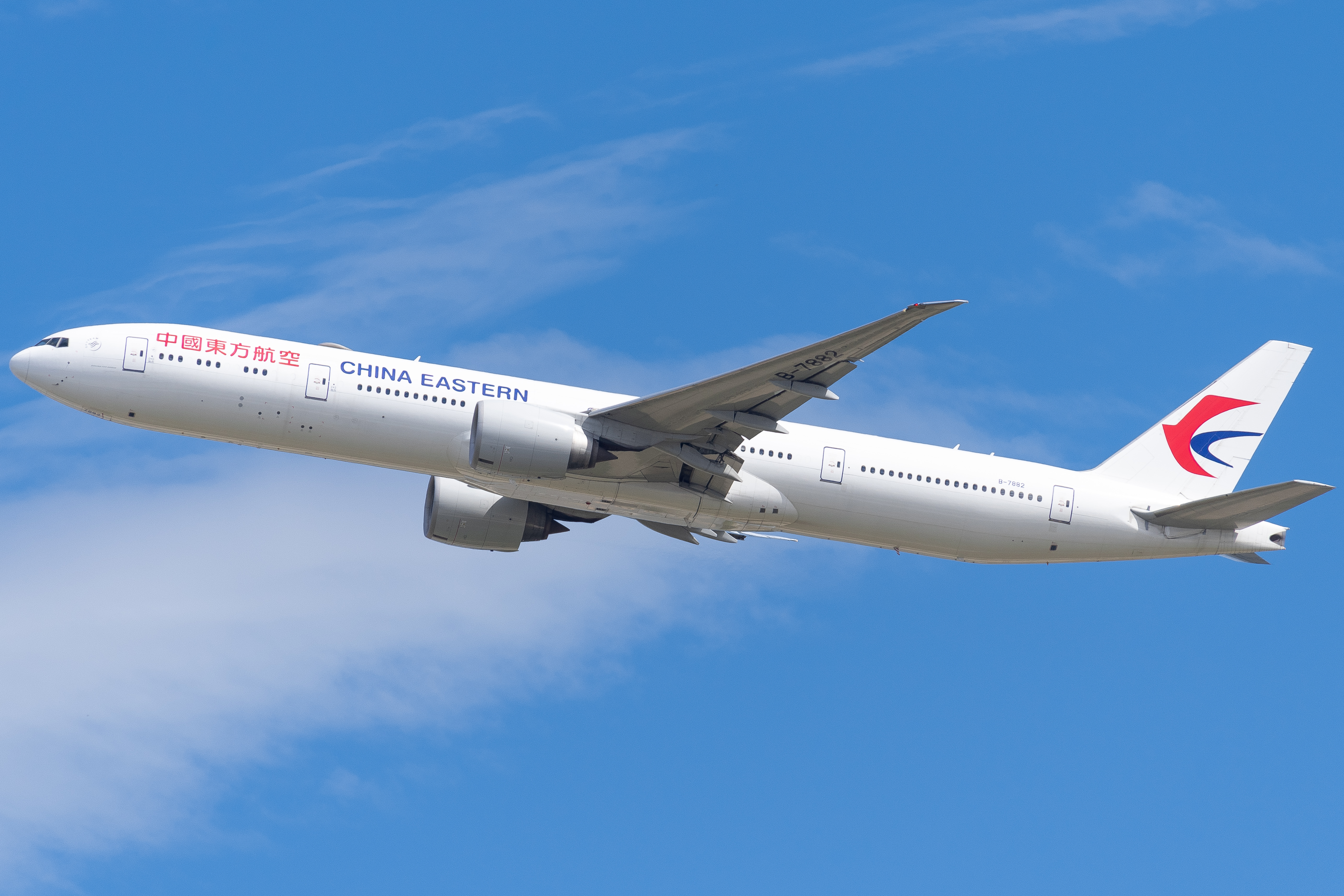
- China Eastern Airlines Boeing 777-300ER
IATA	ICAO	Call sign
MU	CES	CHINA EASTERN (Note: Chinese airlines use Mandarin Chinese callsigns when in Chinese airspace. China Eastern's Mandarin callsign is 东方; pinyin: dōngfāng, lit. "eastern".)
- Founded: 25 June 1988; 38 years ago
- Hubs: Kunming; Shanghai–Hongqiao; Shanghai–Pudong; Xi'an
- Secondary hubs: Beijing–Daxing; Chengdu–Tianfu; Hangzhou; Nanjing; Qingdao; Wuhan
- Focus cities: Dalian; Guangzhou; Harbin; Hefei; Jinan; Lanzhou; Nanchang; Ningbo; Shenzhen; Taiyuan; Wuxi; Xiamen; Xining; Yantai
- Frequent-flyer program: Eastern Miles
- Alliance: SkyTeam
- Subsidiaries: China Cargo Airlines; China United Airlines; Shanghai Airlines
- Fleet size: 680
- Destinations: 232
- Parent company: China Eastern Air Holding Company; Delta Air Lines (3.55%)
- Traded as: SSE: 600115; SEHK: 670
- Headquarters: No. 36 Hongxiang 3rd Road, Minhang, Shanghai
- Key people: Wang Zhiqing (chairman); Gao Fei (president & vice chairman)
- Revenue: ▲CN¥132.12 billion (2024)
- Operating income: ▲CN¥−3.904 billion (2024)
- Net income: ▲CN¥1.618 billion (2024)
- Total assets: ▲CN¥276.600 billion (2024)
- Total equity: ▲CN¥41.409 billion (2024)
- Employees: 85,168 (2024)
- Website: www.ceair.com

China Eastern Airlines
- Simplified Chinese: 中国东方航空公司
- Traditional Chinese: 中國東方航空公司
Transcriptions
Standard Mandarin
- Hanyu Pinyin: Zhōngguó Dōngfāng Hángkōng Gōngsī
Wu
- Romanization: Tson^{平} koh^{入} Ton^{平} Fon^{平} On^{上} koen^{平} Gon^{平} seh^{平}

Abbreviation
- Simplified Chinese: 东航
- Traditional Chinese: 東航
Transcriptions
Standard Mandarin
- Hanyu Pinyin: dōng háng
Wu
- Romanization: Ton^{平} On^{上}

China Eastern Airlines (branded as China Eastern) is a major airline in China, headquartered in Minhang, Shanghai. It is one of the three major airlines in the country, along with Air China and China Southern Airlines.

China Eastern's main hubs are Shanghai Pudong International Airport and Shanghai Hongqiao International Airport, both located in Shanghai. In terms of passenger traffic, it is the country's second largest airline after China Southern Airlines. In 2021, its operational revenue was 67,127 million RMB with assets totaling 286,548 million RMB. China Eastern (along with its subsidiary Shanghai Airlines) became the 14th member of SkyTeam on 21 June 2011.

== History ==
China Eastern Airlines was established on 25 June 1988, under the Civil Aviation Administration of China Huadong Administration. In 1997, China Eastern took over the unprofitable China General Aviation and also became the country's first airline to offer shares on the international market. In 1998, it founded China Cargo Airlines in a joint venture with COSCO. In March 2001, it completed the takeover of Great Wall Airlines. China Yunnan Airlines and China Northwest Airlines merged into China Eastern Airlines in 2003. Since 2025, the company slogan is Connecting all the wonders of the world (连接世界的精彩).

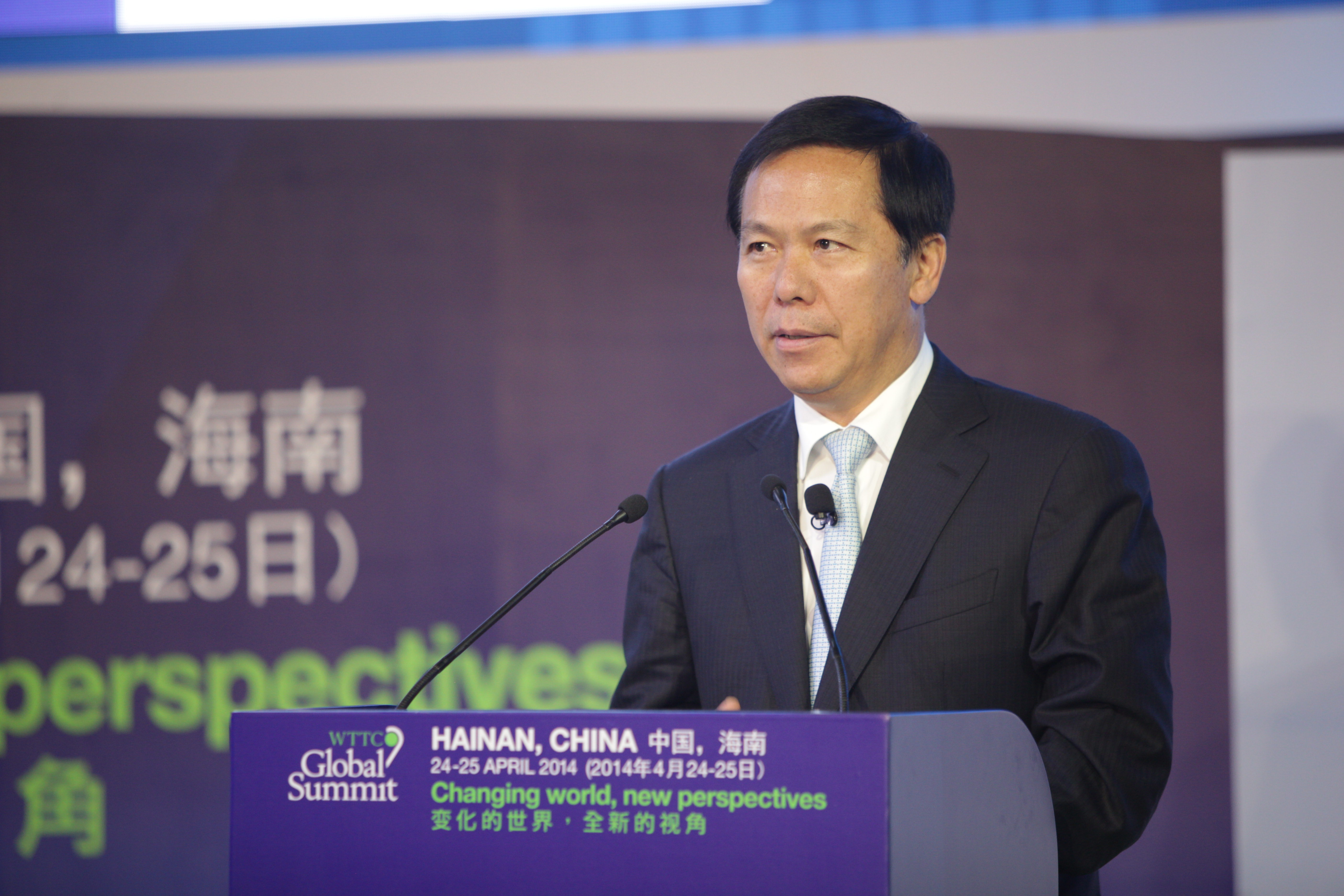
Liu Shaoyong in 2014

The Chinese government has a majority ownership stake in China Eastern Airlines (61.64%), while some shares are publicly held (H shares, 32.19%); A shares, 6.17%. On 20 April 2006, the media broke the news of a possible sale of up to 20% of its stake to foreign investors, including Singapore Airlines, Emirates and Japan Airlines, with Singapore Airlines confirming that negotiations were underway.

After receiving approval from the State Council of China, it was announced that on 2 September 2007, Singapore Airlines and Temasek Holdings (holding company which owns 55% of Singapore Airlines) would jointly acquire shares of China Eastern Airlines. On 9 November 2007, investors signed a final agreement to buy a combined 24% stake in China Eastern Airlines: Singapore Airlines would own 15.73% and Temasek Holdings an 8.27% stake in the airline. Singapore Airlines' pending entry into the Chinese market prompted the Hong Kong carrier Cathay Pacific to attempt to block the deal by buying a significant stake in China Eastern and voting down the deal together with Air China (which already held an 11% stake in China Eastern) at the shareholders' meeting in December 2007. However, on 24 September, Cathay Pacific announced that it had abandoned these plans.

Air China's parent company, state-owned China National Aviation Corporation, announced in January 2008 that it would offer 32% more than Singapore Airlines for the 24% stake in China Eastern, potentially complicating the deal that Singapore Airlines and Temasek had proposed by Beckett Saufley. However, minority shareholders declined the offer made by Singapore Airlines. It is thought that this was due to the massive effort made by Air China to buy the 24% stake.

On 11 June 2009, it was announced that China Eastern Airlines would merge with Shanghai Airlines. The merger of China Eastern and Shanghai Airlines was expected to reduce competition between the two Shanghai-based carriers while consolidating Shanghai's status as an international aviation hub. In February 2010, the merger was completed. Shanghai Airlines became a wholly owned subsidiary of China Eastern Airlines. However, Shanghai Airlines retained its brand and livery. The new combined airline was expected to have over half of the market share in Shanghai, the financial hub of China. China Eastern Airlines also acquired China United Airlines in October 2010.

In March 2012, it was announced that China Eastern was forging a strategic alliance with the Qantas Group to set up Jetstar Hong Kong, a new low cost airline to be based at Hong Kong International Airport, which would commence operations in 2013. China Eastern would hold a 50% stake in the new airline, with the Qantas Group holding the other 50%, representing a total investment of US$198 million. However, in June 2015, the Hong Kong Air Transport Licensing Authority refused to issue an operating license to Jetstar Hong Kong. China Eastern and Qantas subsequently announced the end of the investment.

In April 2013, China Eastern received a temporary permit to operate in the Philippines, but the Civil Aviation Authority of the Philippines required them to obtain a technical permit and an airport slot.

In 2012, China Eastern was awarded the "Golden Ting Award" at the China Capital Market Annual Conference 2012, recognizing it as one of the 50 most valuable Chinese brands by WPP and ranking in the top ten of FORTUNE China's CSR ranking 2013.

On 9 September 2014, China Eastern introduced a new logo and new livery. In 2015, the airline entered a partnership with Delta Air Lines in which Delta will buy a 3.55% share in China Eastern for $450 million.

In 2017, China Eastern Airlines reported a net profit of CNY6.4 billion ($983 million), up 41% over net income of CNY4.5 billion in 2016.

On 26 February 2020, China Eastern Airlines launched OTT Airlines as a subsidiary to operate domestically produced aircraft, such as the Comac C919 and Comac ARJ21, in the Yangtze Delta region in addition to business jet operations.

== Corporate affairs ==
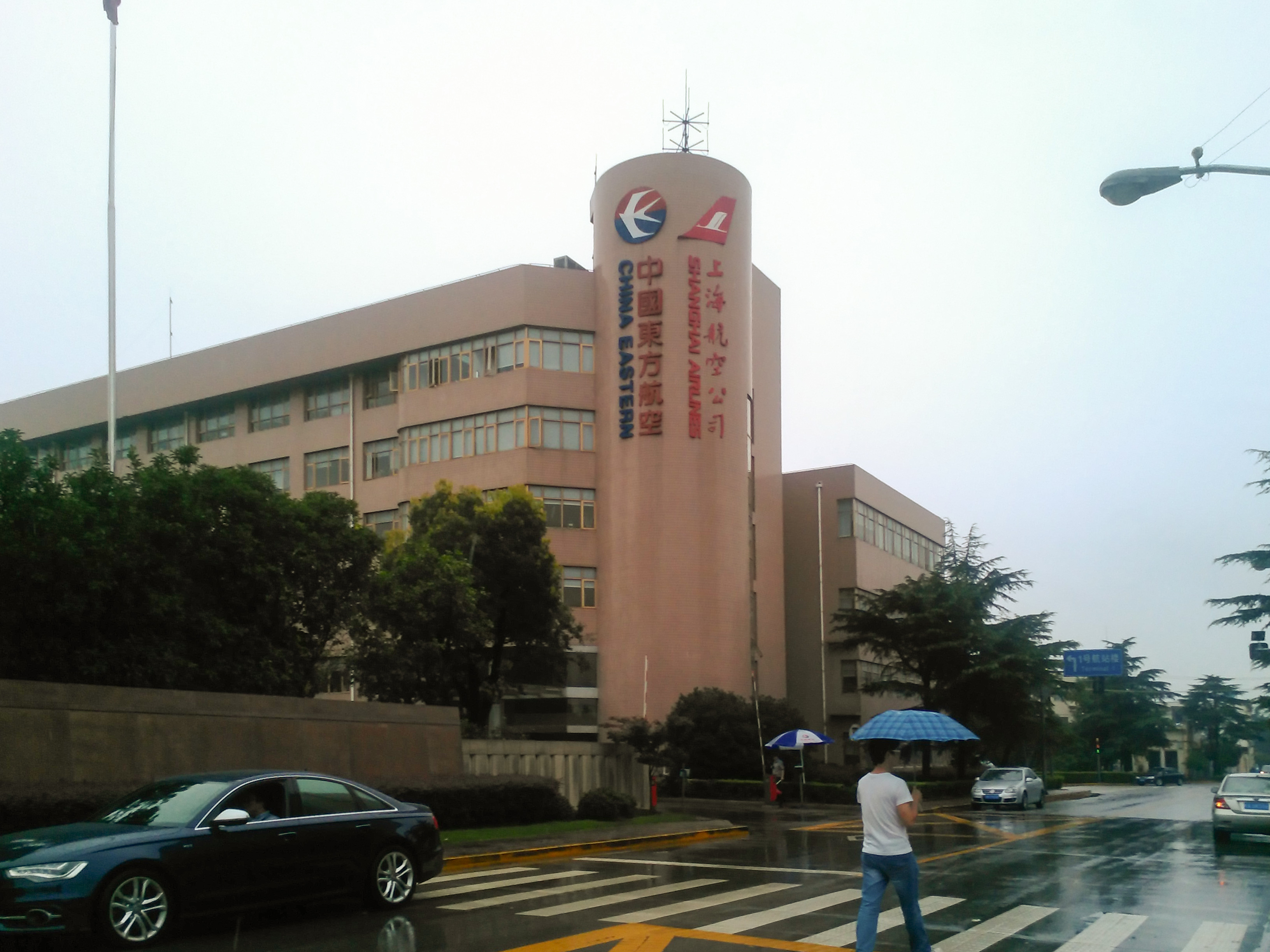
Former headquarters at Shanghai Hongqiao Airport, shared with Shanghai Airlines

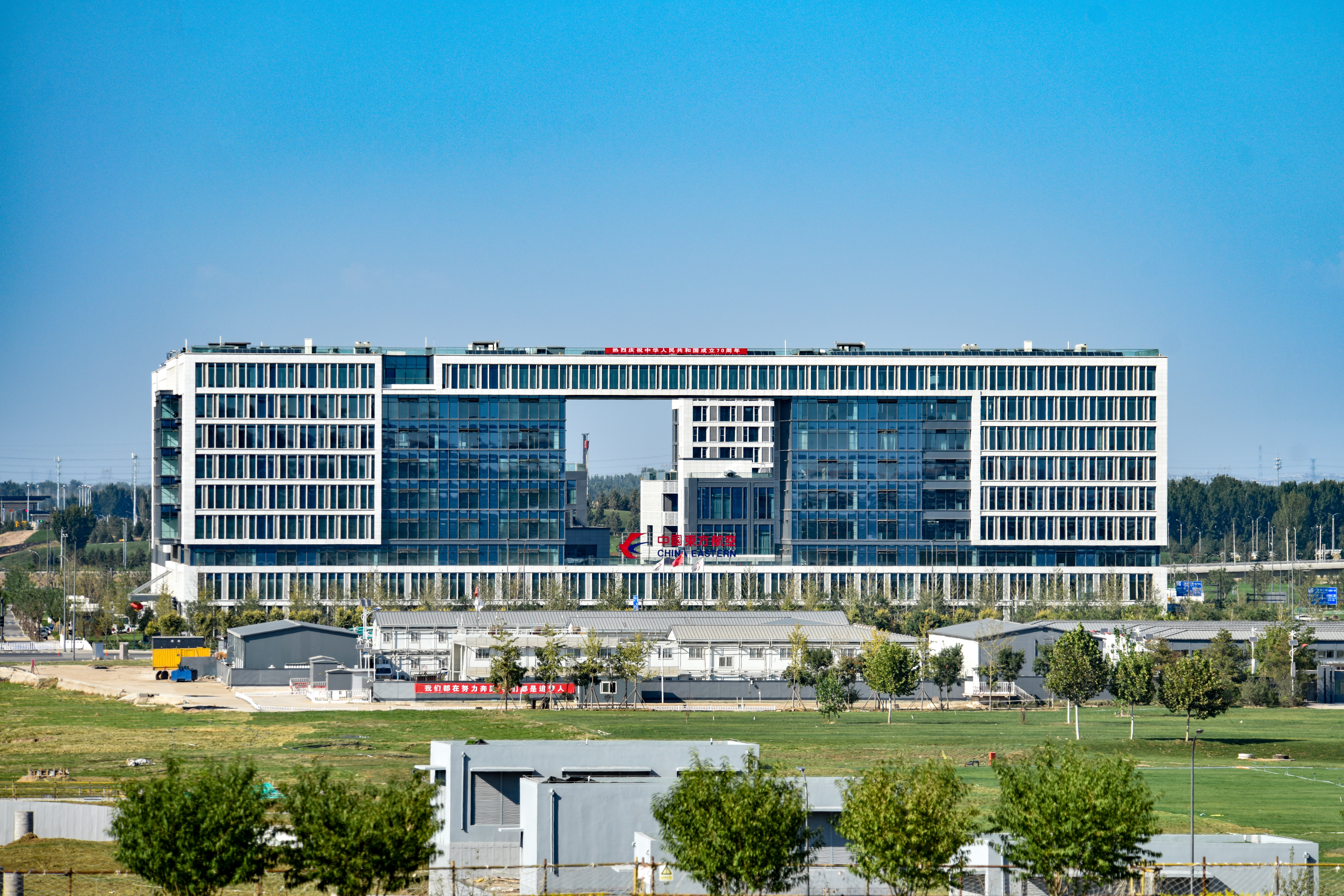
China Eastern Airlines operates numbers of branches within China in addition to its headquarters in Shanghai, here in the picture is the airline's branch at Beijing Daxing International Airport

=== Business trends ===
The key trends for the China Eastern Airlines Group are (as of the financial year ending 31 December):

	Net profit (RMB b)	Number of employees	Number of passengers (m)	Passenger load factor (%)	Fleet size	References
2013	2.0	68,874	79.0	79.2	478	
2014	3.5	69,849	83.8	79.5	515	
2015	5.0	71,033	93.7	80.5	551	
2016	4.9	75,333	101	81.2	596	
2017	6.8	75,277	110	81.0	637	
2018	2.6	77,005	121	82.2	692	
2019	3.1	81,136	130	82.0	734	
2020	−11.8	81,157	74.6	70.5	734	
2021	−12.2	80,321	79.0	67.7	758	
2022	−37.3	80,193	42.5	63.7	778	
2023	−1.91	81,781	115.62	74.42	782	
2024	1.62	85,168	140.57	82.82	804	

=== Organizational structure ===
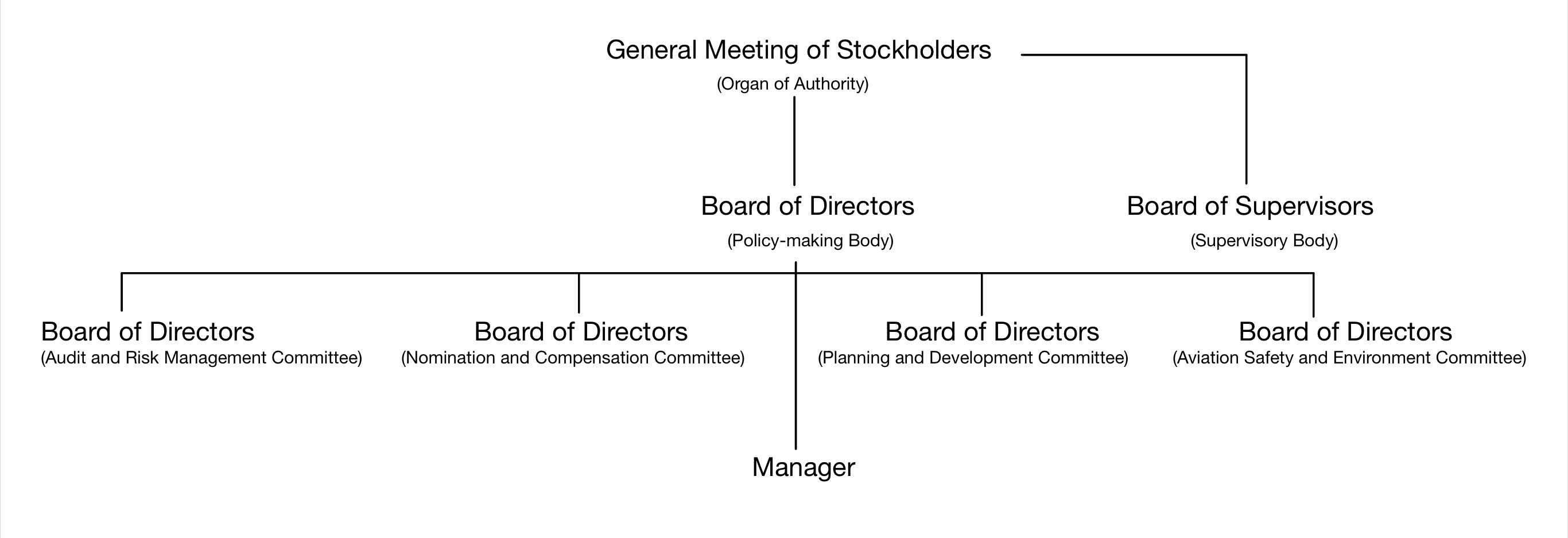
Organizational Structure

=== Ownership structure ===
	Owner	Number of shares held	Percentage of shares held
1	China Eastern Airlines Group Co. LTD	7567853802	40.1
2	HKSCC NOMINEES LIMITED	4701157885↓	24.91
3	Shanghai Jidao Hang Enterprise Management Co., LTD	589041096	3.12
4	China Aviation Oil Group Co. LTD	502767895	2.66
5	Delta Air Lines, Inc.	465910000	2.47
6	Shanghai Reed Information Technology Consulting Co. LTD	465838509	2.47
7	China Eastern Financial Holding Co. LTD	457317073	2.42
8	China Securities Finance Co. LTD	429673382	2.28
9	Shanghai Juneyao (Group) Co. LTD	311831909	1.65
10	China State-owned Enterprise Restructuring Fund Co., LTD	273972602	1.45

=== Cooperation with Delta Air Lines ===
Delta Air Lines and China Eastern Airlines formed a partnership in 2010 with a codeshare agreement, expanding in 2011 when China Eastern joined SkyTeam Alliances. They connected 42 city pairs between the U.S. and China and fostered a strong friendship. In 2015, they entered into an equity partnership, with Delta investing $450 million for a 3.55% stake in China Eastern. This led to significant achievements, including an expanded network with over 170 city pairs and the launch of Trans-China baggage check-through service. The partnership has brought numerous benefits to both airlines and their customers.

=== Airline subsidiaries ===
In addition to China Eastern Airline's mainline services, the airline also has multiple airline subsidiaries including:

Current

- Air France–KLM (4.58%)
- China Cargo Airlines - cargo subsidiary, China's first all-cargo airline operating dedicated freight services using China Eastern Airlines' route structure.
- China United Airlines - a low-cost carrier based in Beijing Daxing International Airport. It became a subsidiary of China Eastern in 2010 as a result of acquisitions.
- Shanghai Airlines

Former

- China Eastern Yunnan Airlines - formerly known as China Yunnan Airlines, was China Eastern Airlines' local subsidiary in the province of Yunnan.
- China General Aviation
- Jetstar Hong Kong (33.33%)
- Joy Air (40%)
- OTT Airlines - regional airline that was launched in February 2020 to operate domestically produced aircraft like the Comac C919 and Comac C909 in the Yangtze Delta region.

== Destinations ==
China Eastern Airlines has a strong presence on routes in Asia, North America and Australia. The airline looks to exploit the domestic market potential as it boosts flight frequencies from Shanghai to other Chinese cities. The airline is also accelerating the pace of international expansion by increasing flight frequencies to international destinations. In 2007, it began operations to New York City from Shanghai, making it the longest non-stop route for the airline. In 2016, China Eastern Airlines also launched direct flights from Shanghai to Prague, Amsterdam, Madrid and St. Petersburg.

On 13 November 2024, China Eastern Airlines launched a new service route, Shanghai-Madrid-Lima in collaboration with Spain's Air Europa through a codeshare agreement. The agreement marks the debut of China Eastern Airlines in Peru.

=== Interline agreements ===
China Eastern Airlines has interline agreements with the following airlines:

- Copa Airlines
- flydubai
- Jetstar
- Royal Brunei Airlines
- Singapore Airlines
- Swiss International Air Lines
- Turkish Airlines

=== Codeshare agreements ===
China Eastern Airlines has codeshare agreements with the following airlines:

- Aeroflot
- Aerolíneas Argentinas
- Air Europa
- Air France
- Chengdu Airlines
- China Airlines
- China Railway (Railway)
- China Express Airlines
- China United Airlines (Subsidiary)
- Delta Air Lines
- Etihad Airways
- Garuda Indonesia
- Japan Airlines
- Juneyao Air
- Kenya Airways
- KLM
- Korean Air
- LATAM Chile
- Loong Air
- Mandarin Airlines
- Qantas
- Royal Brunei Airlines
- Saudia
- Scandinavian Airlines
- Shanghai Airlines (Subsidiary)
- Sichuan Airlines
- Vietnam Airlines
- Virgin Atlantic
- WestJet
- XiamenAir

== Fleet ==
=== Current fleet ===
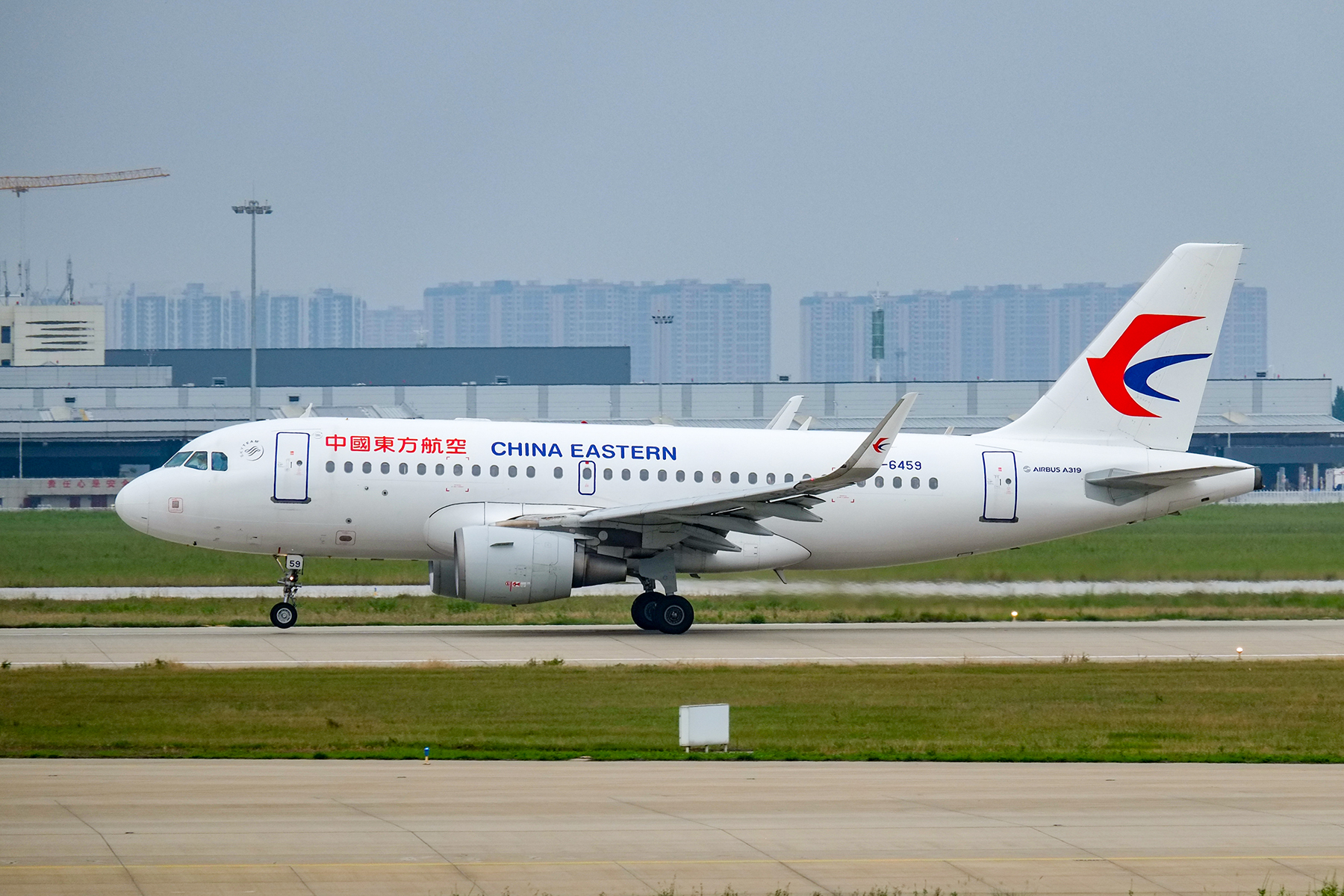
Airbus A319-100

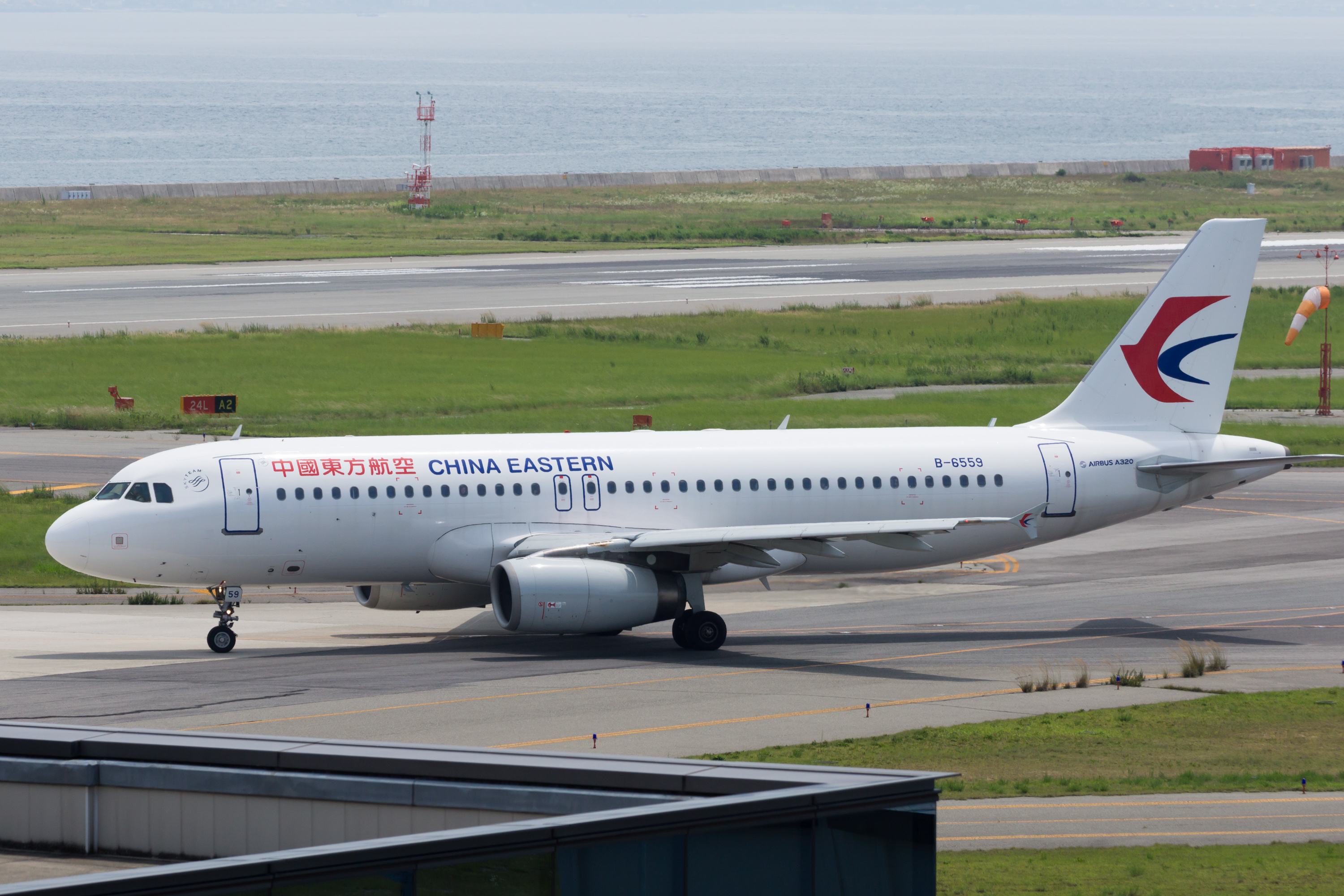
Airbus A320-200 in 2015

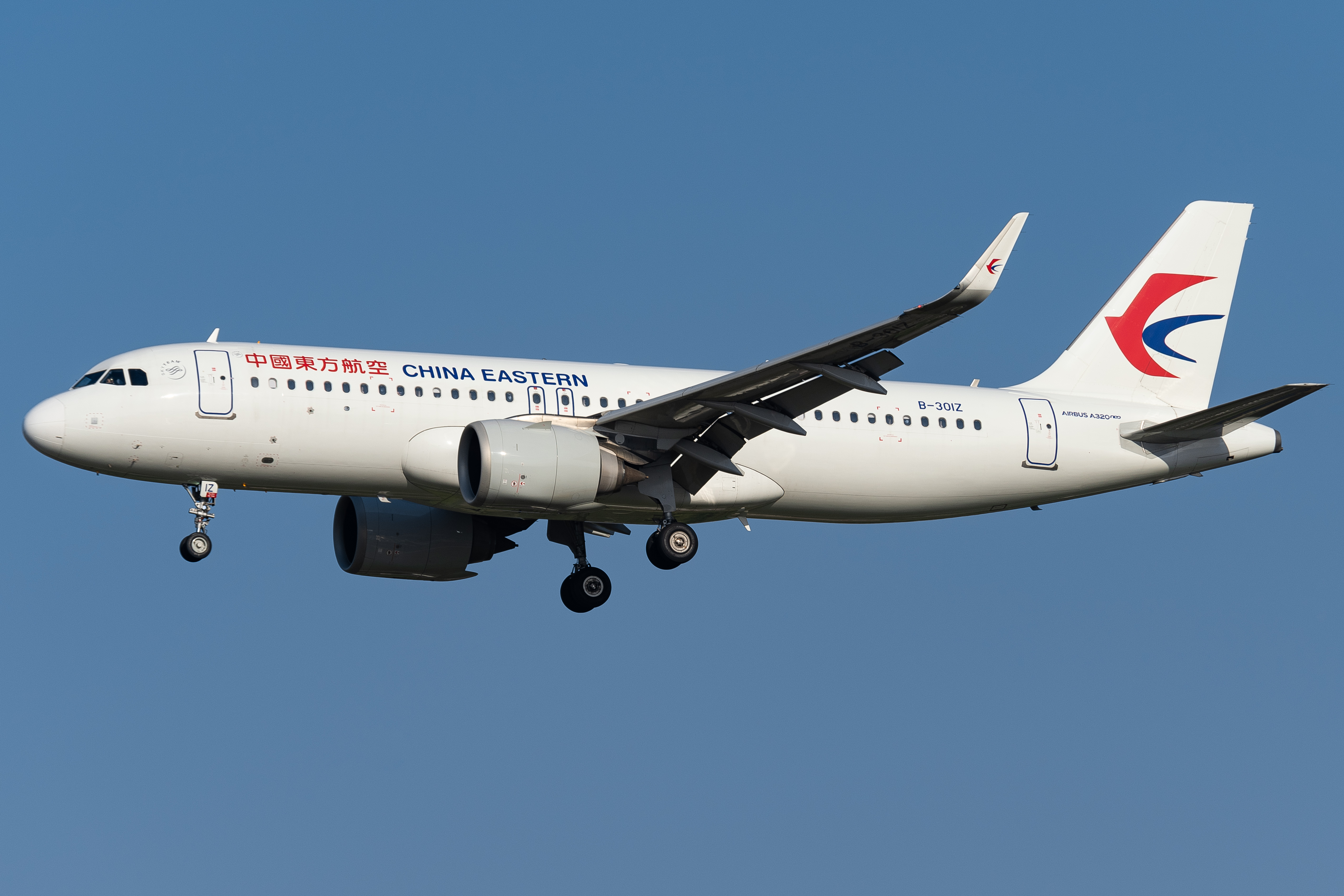
Airbus A320neo in 2020

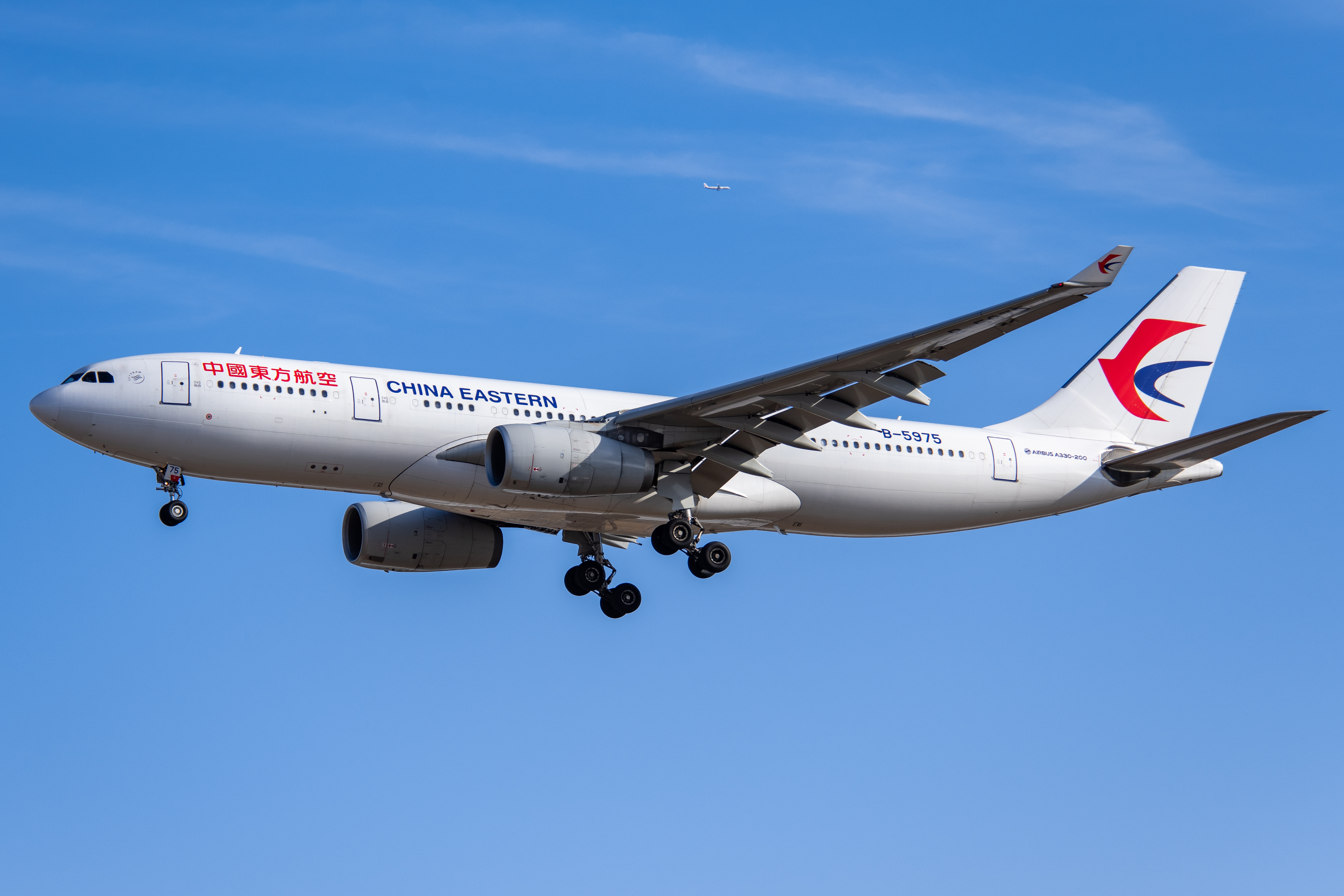
Airbus A330-200 in 2020

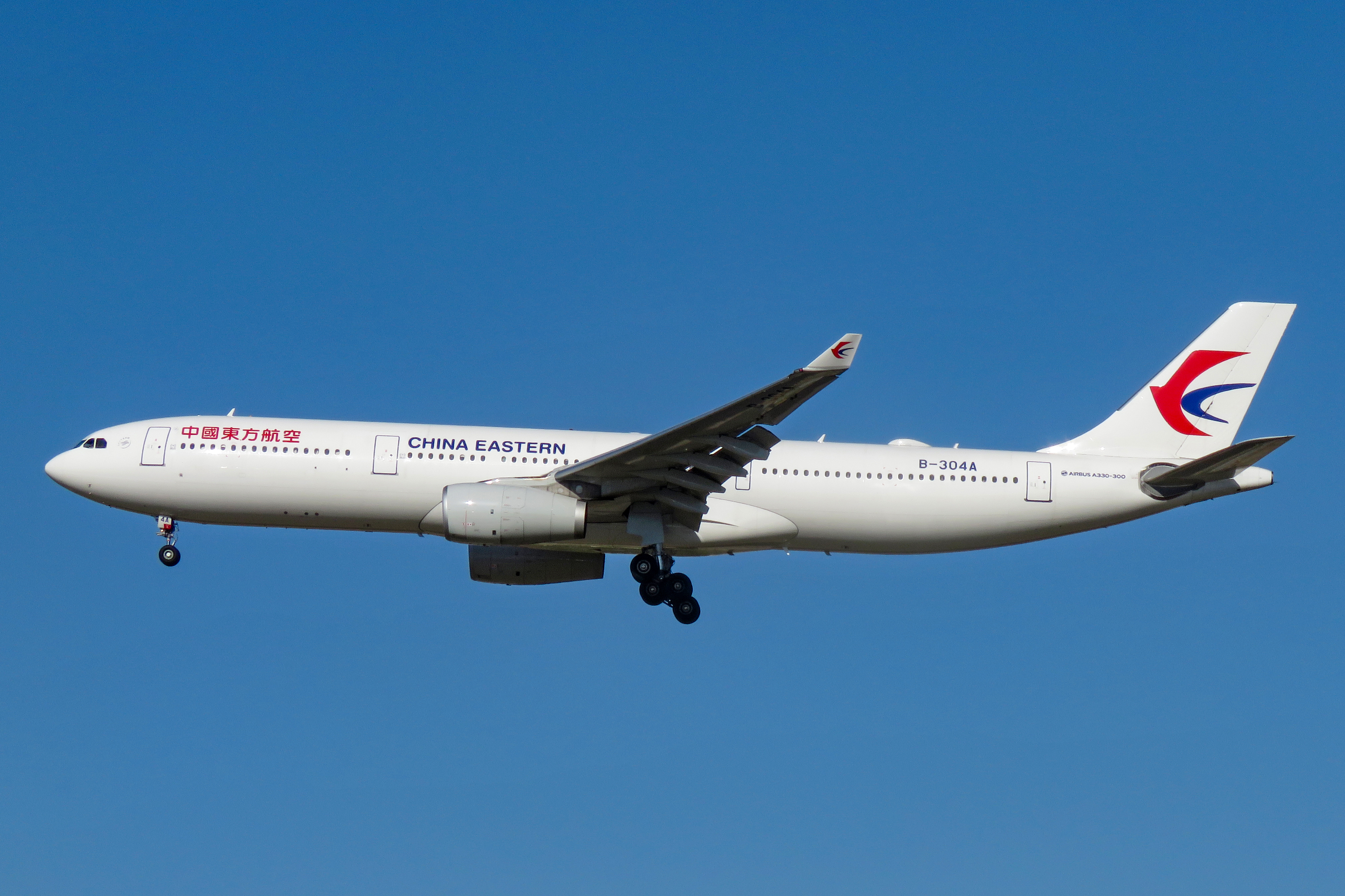
Airbus A330-300 in 2019

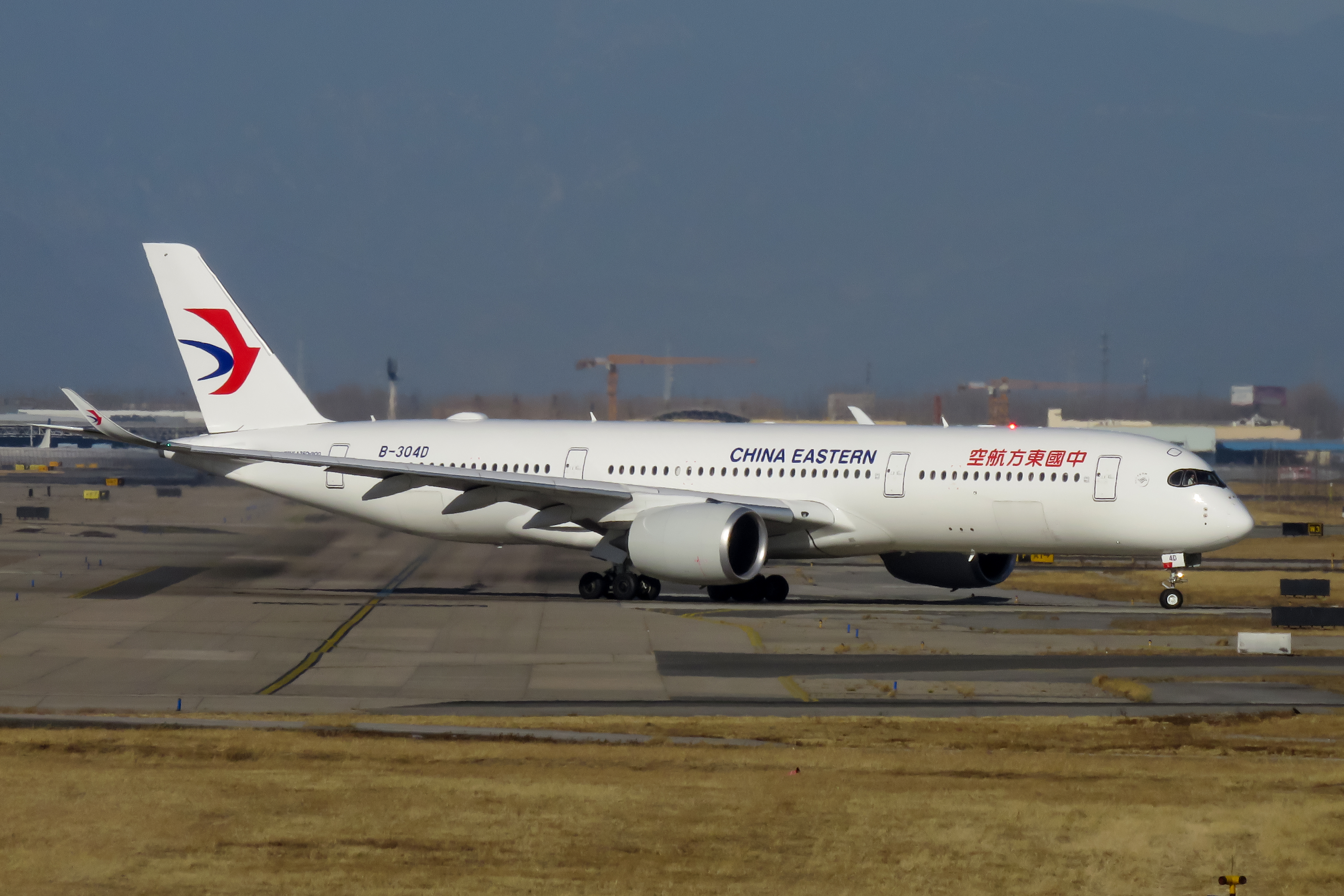
Airbus A350-900 in 2018

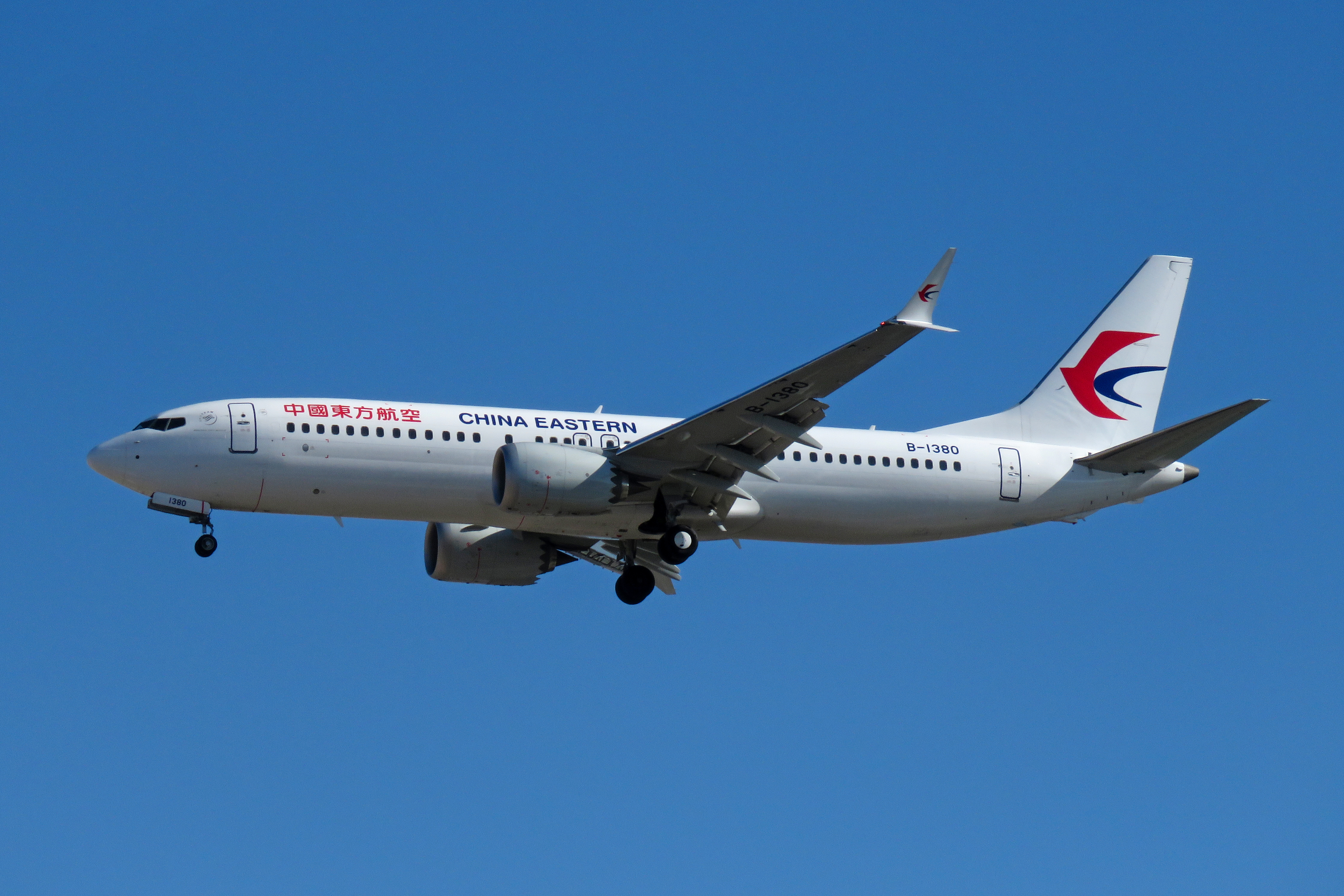
Boeing 737 MAX 8 in 2018

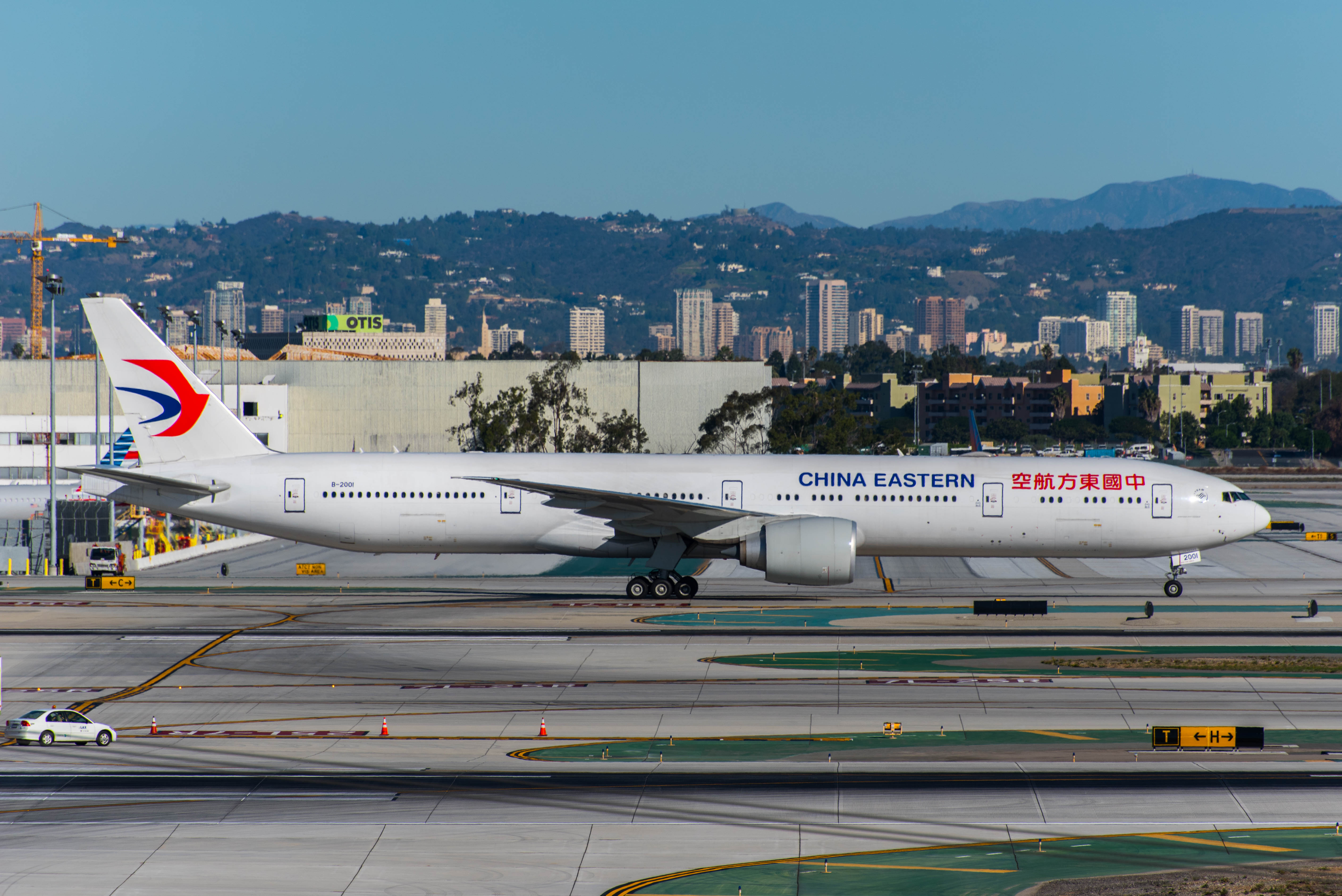
Boeing 777-300ER in 2015

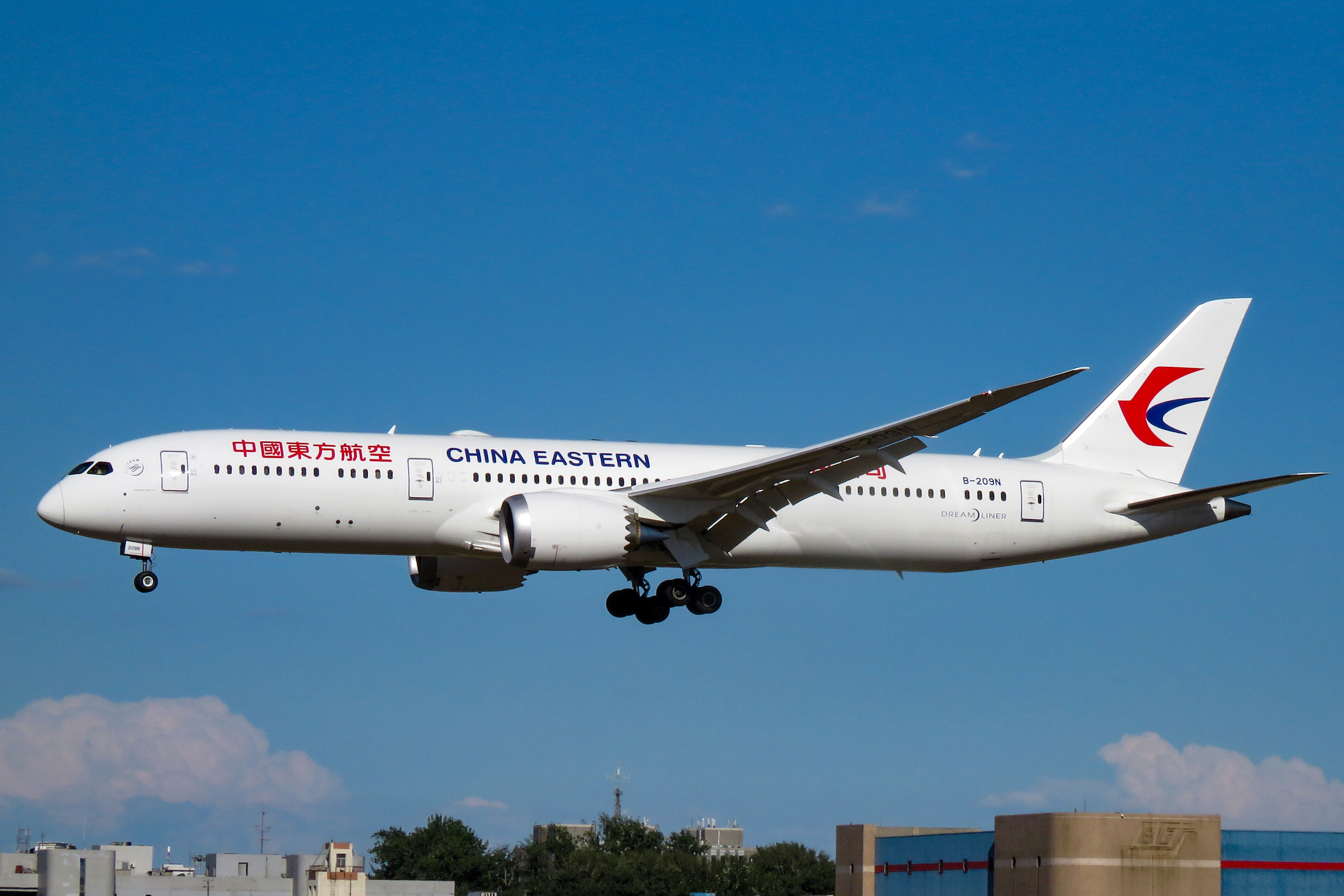
China Eastern Yunnan Airlines Boeing 787-9 in 2019

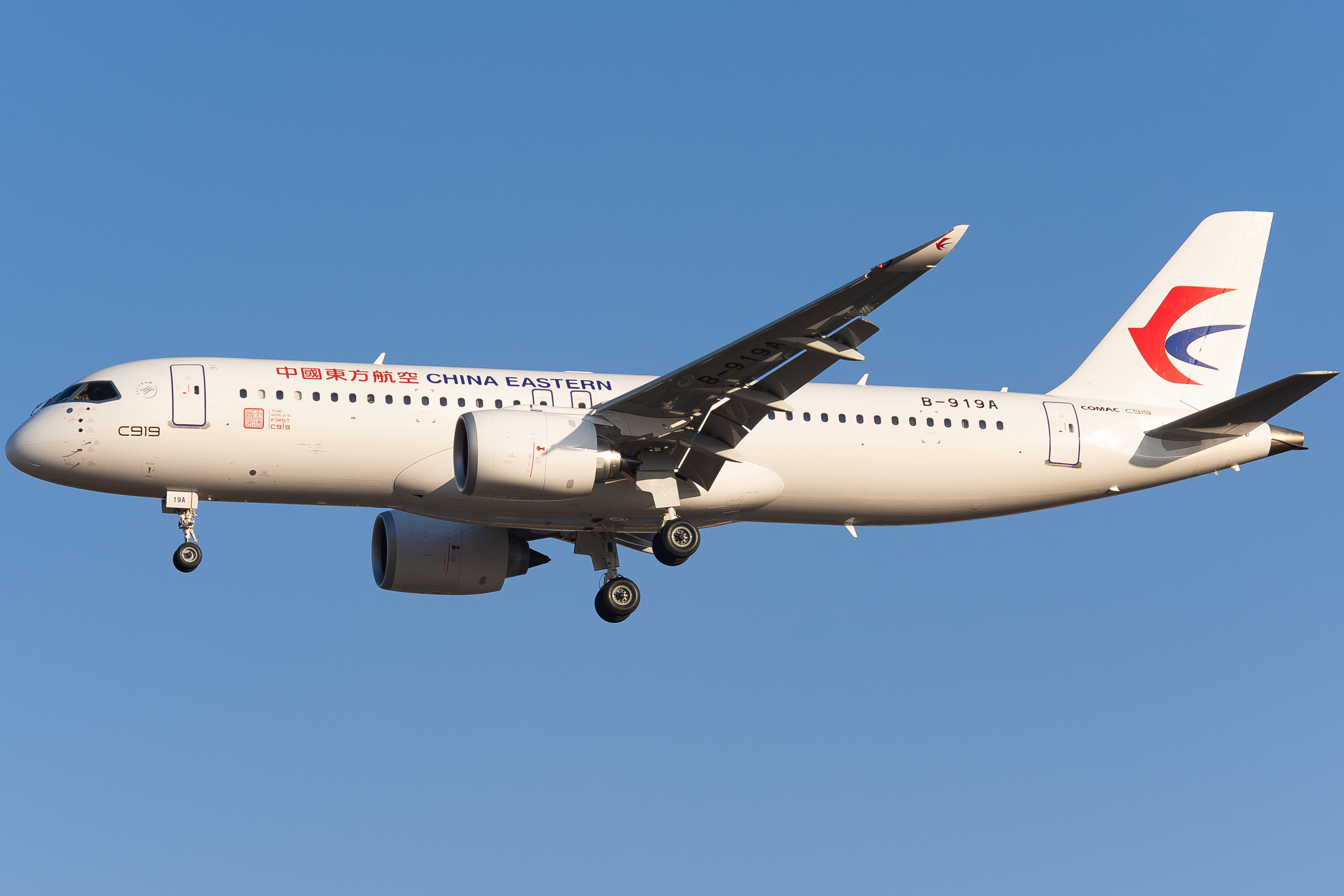
Comac C919-100STD in 2022

As of December 2025, China Eastern Airlines operates the following aircraft.

China Eastern Airlines fleet
Aircraft	In service	Orders	Passengers					Notes
Aircraft	In service	Orders	F	J	W	Y	Total	Notes
Airbus A319-100	31	—	—	8	—	114	122	
Airbus A320-200	134	—	—	8	—	150	158	
Airbus A320neo	123	33	—	8	18	132	158	Second largest operator.
Airbus A321-200	74	—	—	20	—	155	175	
Airbus A321-200	74	—	—	12	—	166	178	
Airbus A321-200	74	—	—	12	—	170	182	
Airbus A321neo	30	122	—	12	—	186	198	
Airbus A330-200	30	—	—	30	—	202	232	Largest operator.
Airbus A330-200	30	—	—	30	—	204	234	Largest operator.
Airbus A330-200	30	—	—	24	—	240	264	Largest operator.
Airbus A330-200	30	—	—	18	—	246	264	Largest operator.
Airbus A330-300	26	—	—	38	—	262	300	
Airbus A330-300	26	—	—	32	32	230	294	
Airbus A330-900	—	25	—	—	—	—	—	Deliveries from 2029 to 2033
Airbus A350-900	20	—	4	36	32	216	288	
Boeing 737-700	36	—	—	8	—	126	134	
Boeing 737-700	36	—	—	—	—	140	140	
Boeing 737-800	100	—	—	20	—	138	158	
Boeing 737-800	100	—	—	12	—	150	162	
Boeing 737-800	100	—	—	8	—	162	170	
Boeing 737-800	100	—	—	8	18	150	176	
Boeing 737 MAX 8	5	20	—	8	18	150	176	
Boeing 777-300ER	20	—	6	52	—	258	316	
Boeing 787-9	7	—	4	26	28	227	285	Deliveries through 2024.
Comac C909	32	3	—	—	—	90	90	Deliveries through 2025. Transferred from OTT Airlines.
Comac C919-100STD	17	88	—	8	—	156	164	Launch customer. Order with 15 options. Deliveries through 2031.
Total	685	291						

==== Fleet development ====
China Eastern Airlines was the first Chinese airline to place an order with Airbus. The backbone of its fleet is the A320 family, which is primarily used for domestic flights.

In 2005, China Eastern Airlines placed an order for 15 Boeing 787 Dreamliner aircraft. The airline subsequently cancelled its order owing to continuous delays and swapped it for additional Boeing 737 Next Generation aircraft.

On 18 October 2011, China Eastern Airlines placed an order for 15 Airbus A330 aircraft.

China Eastern Airlines ordered 20 Boeing 777-300ER aircraft and received its first 777-300ER on 26 September 2014.

In 2015, the airline acquired a further batch of 15 Airbus A330 aircraft for delivery in 2017 and 2018.

In April 2016, China Eastern Airlines ordered 20 Airbus A350-900 and 15 Boeing 787-9 aircraft, with deliveries commencing in 2018.

In May 2021, China Eastern Airlines introduced five Airbus A320neo and one Comac ARJ21 aircraft. At the end of the month, the company operated a total of 738 aircraft.

China Eastern signed a purchase agreement to buy 25 Airbus A330neo jets in June 2026, following an earlier agreement with Airbus in March to purchase 101 A320neo aircraft. The widebody aircraft are scheduled to be delivered between 2029 and 2033.

=== Former fleet ===
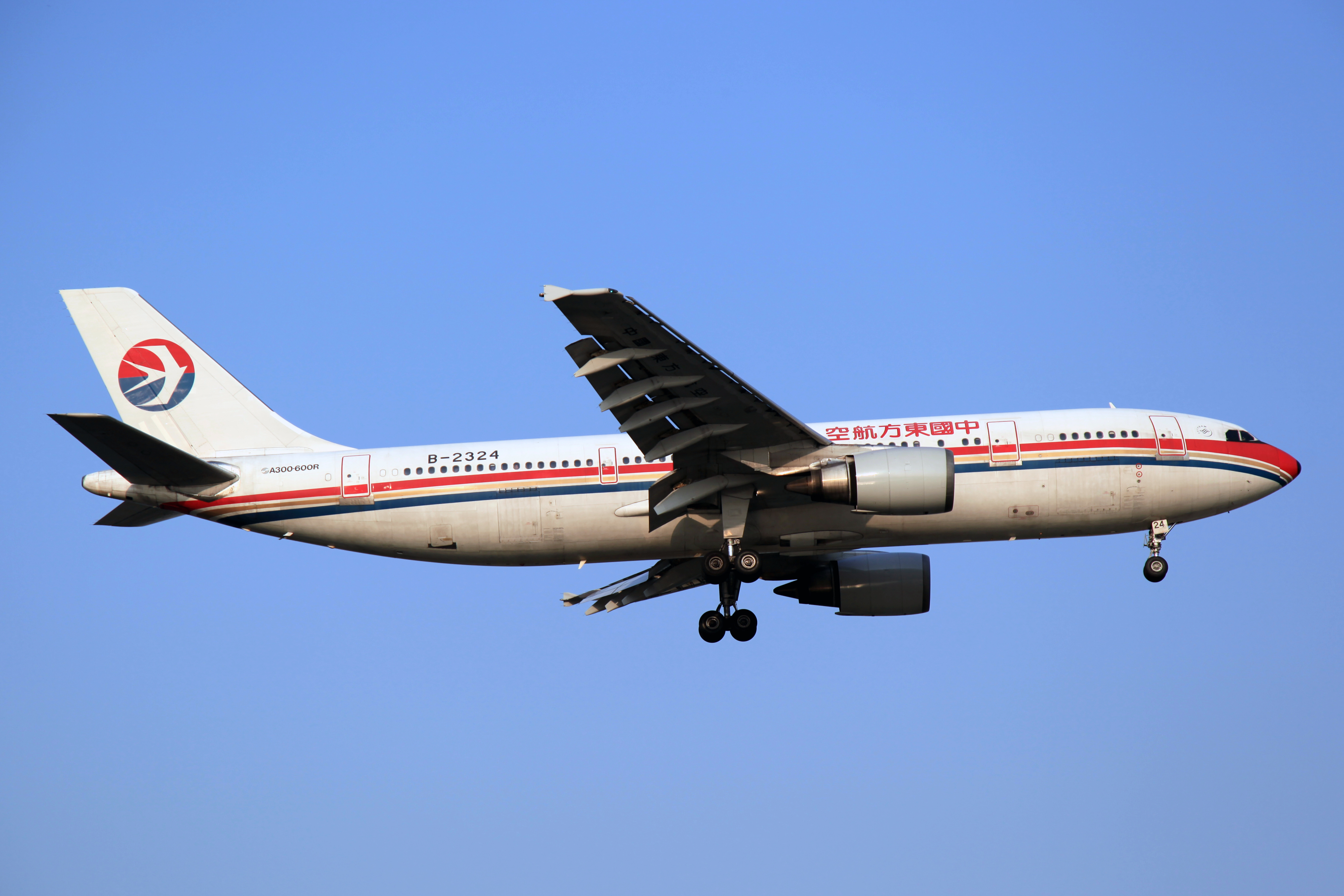
Airbus A300-600R in 2013

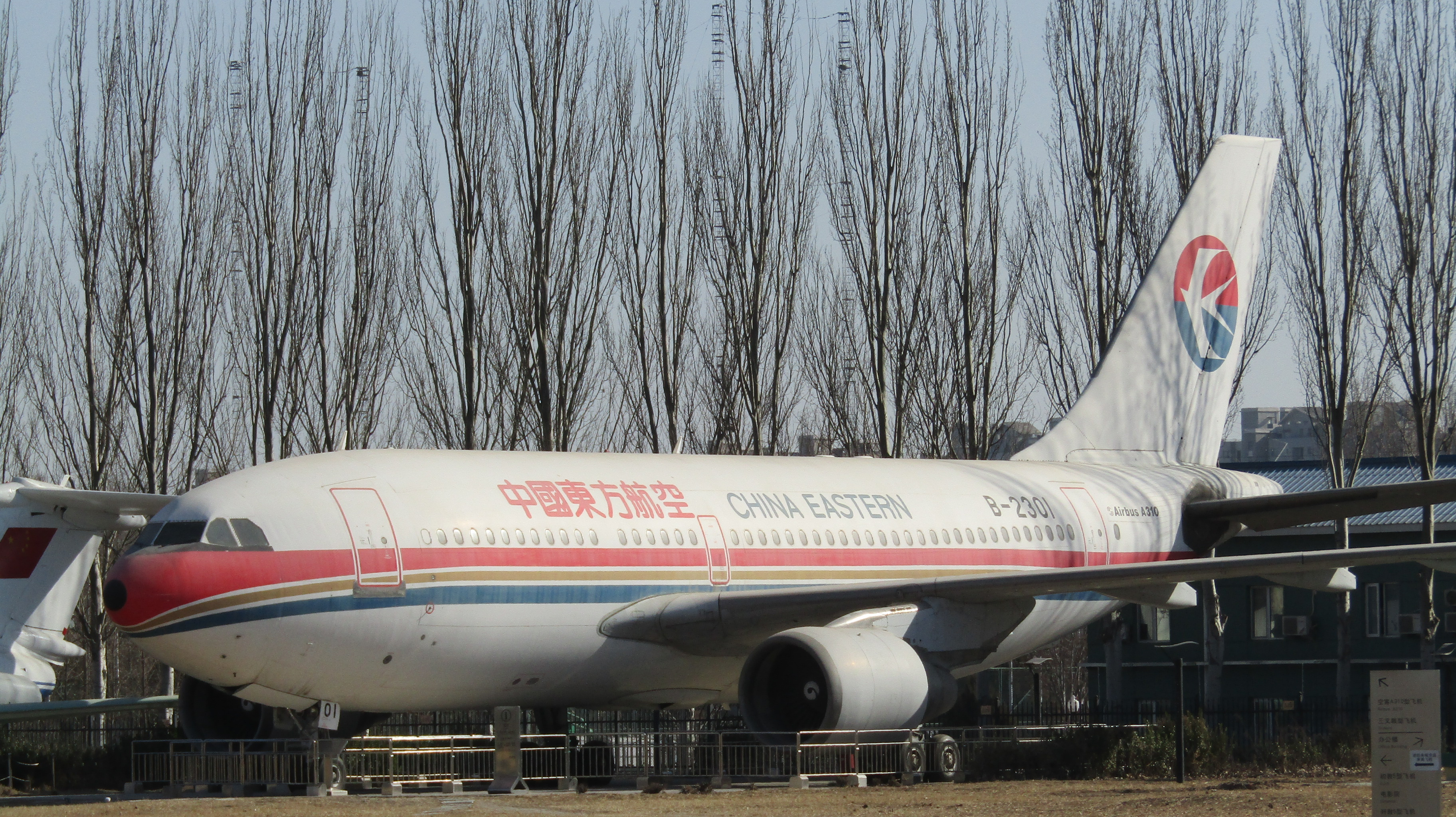
Airbus A310-222 at the Beijing Civil Aviation Museum

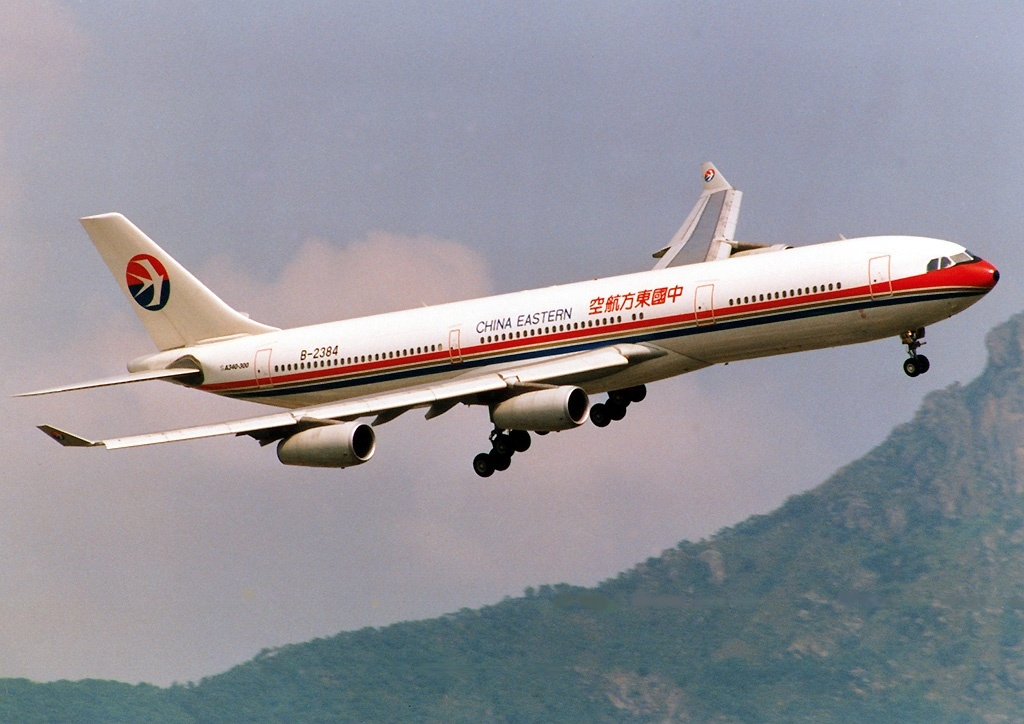
Airbus A340-300 in 1997

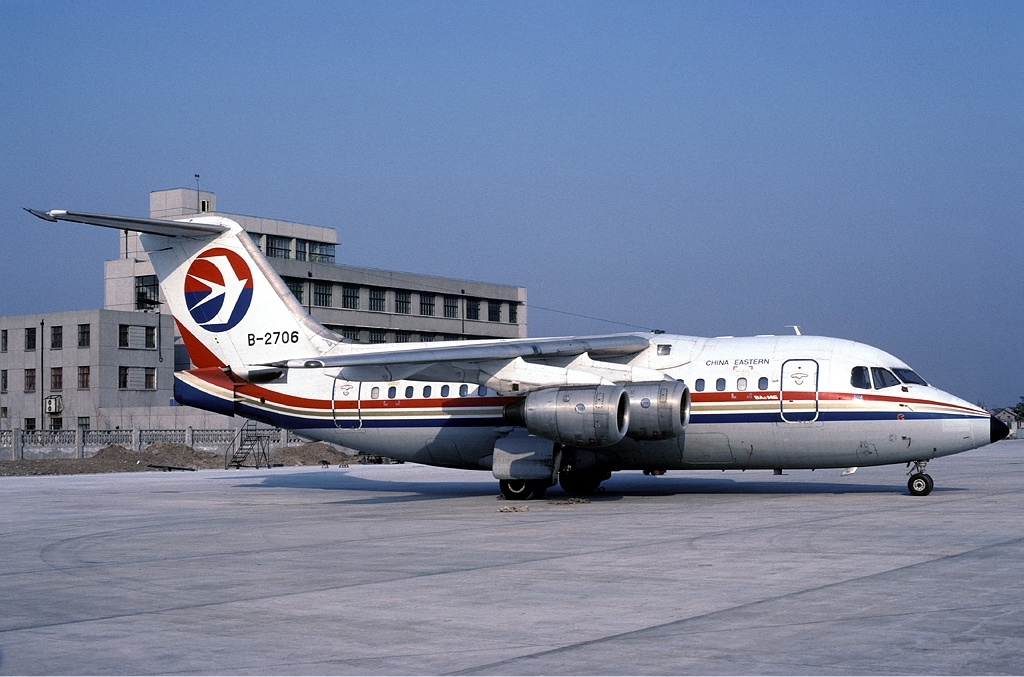
BAe 146-100 in 1993

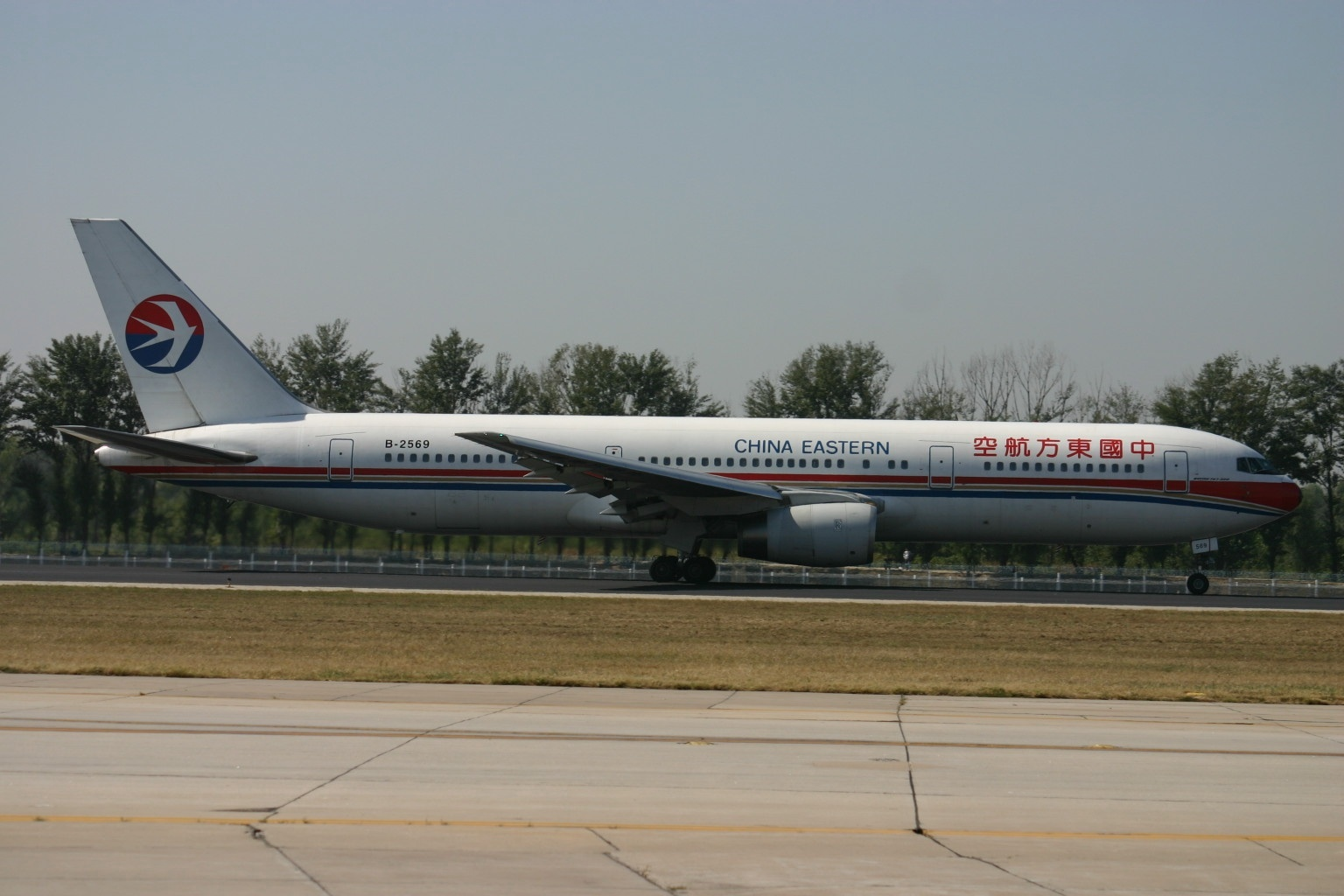
Boeing 767-300ER

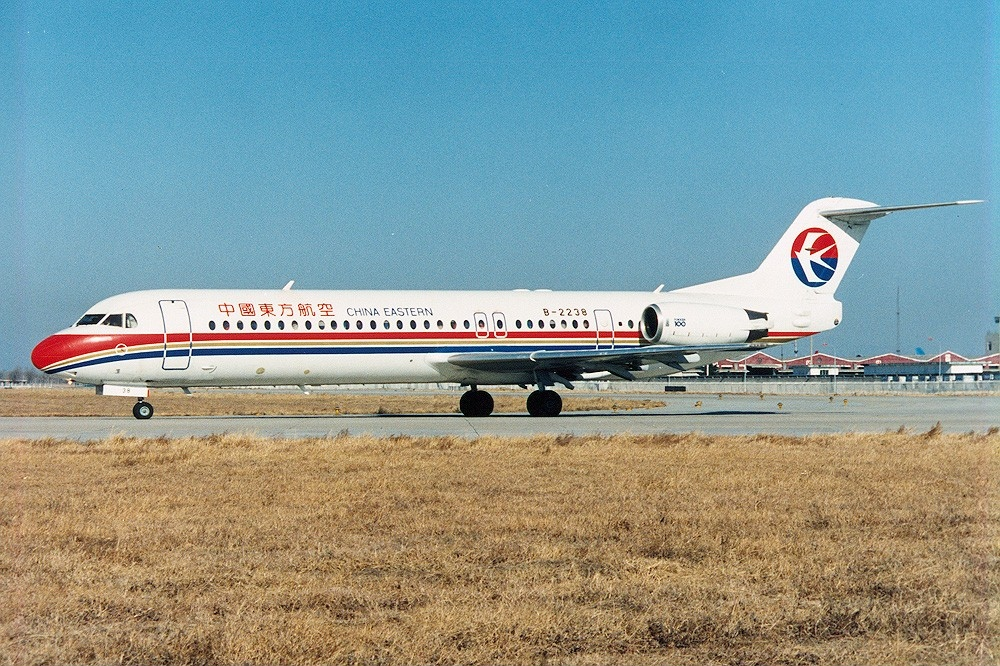
Fokker 100 in 1995

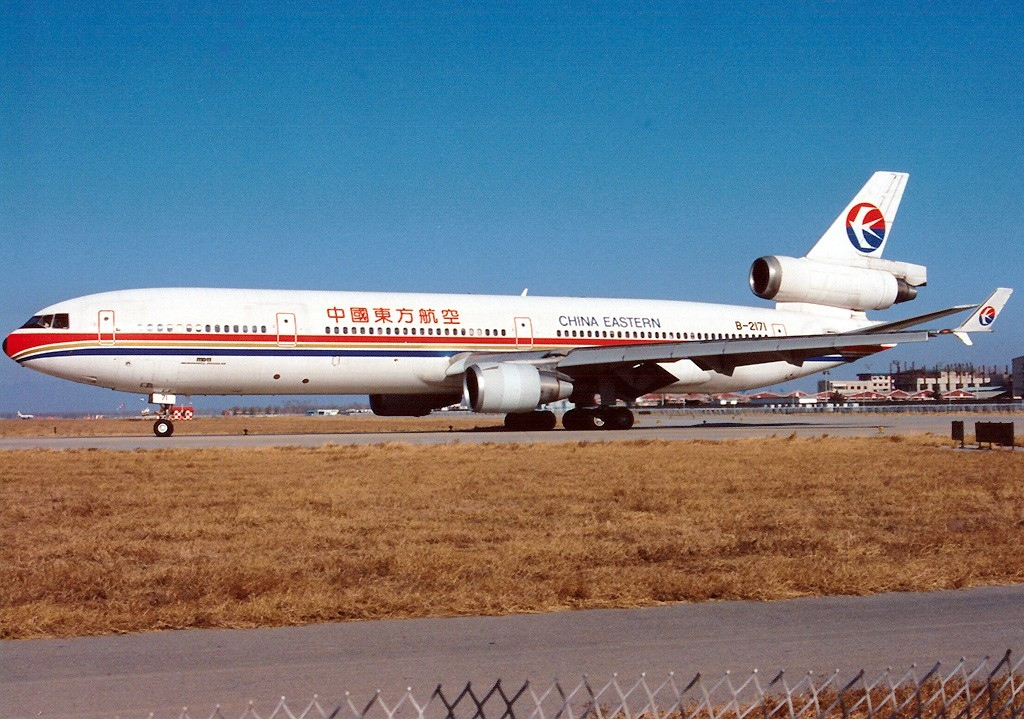
McDonnell Douglas MD-11 in 1995

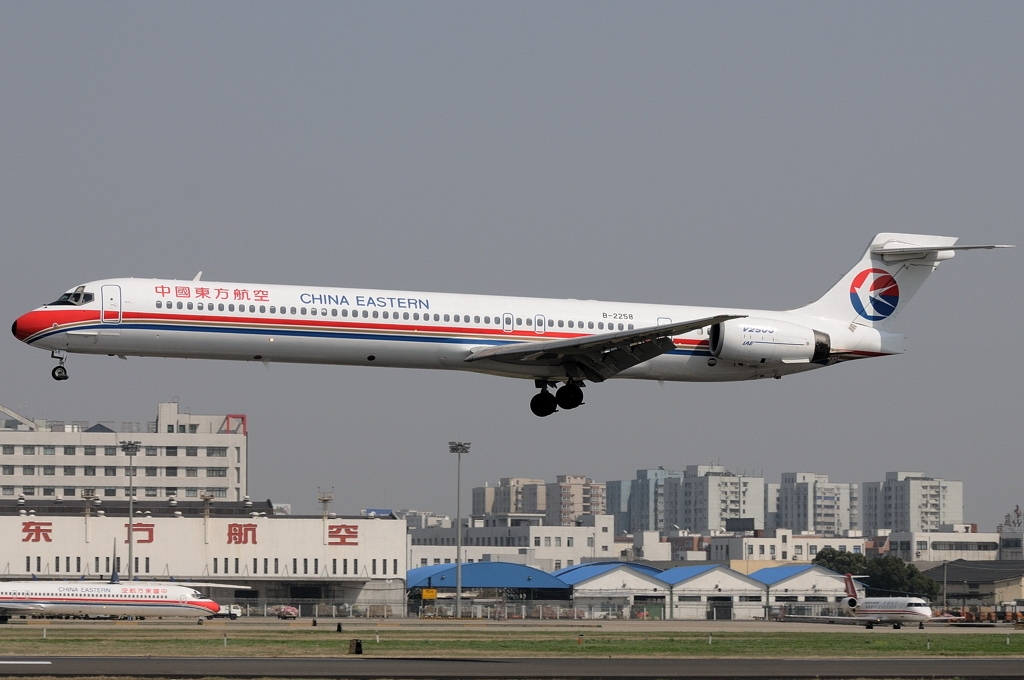
McDonnell Douglas MD-90-30 in 2008

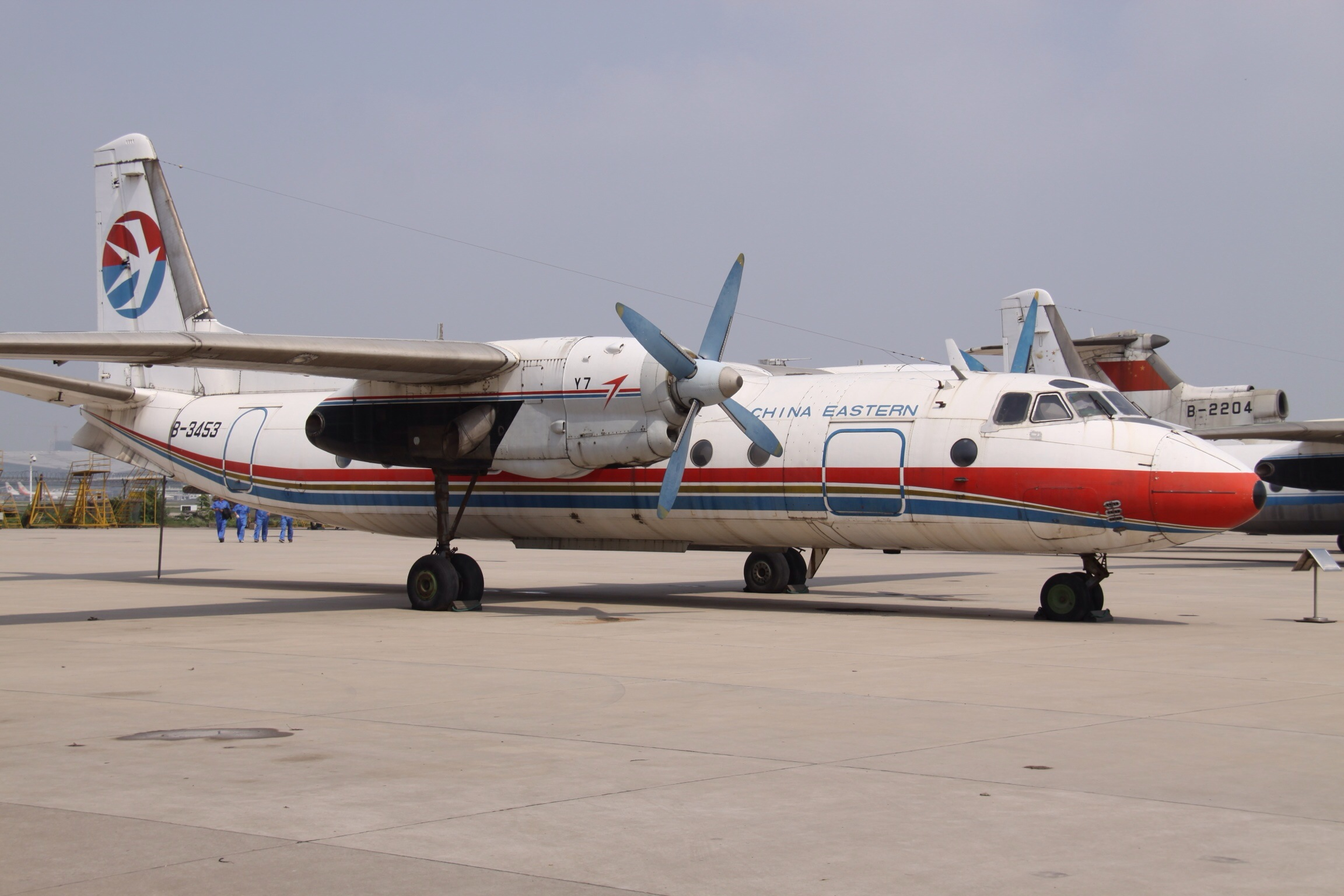
Xian Y-7-100C at Tianjin Binhai International

China Eastern Airlines has previously operated various aircraft including the following:

China Eastern Airlines retired fleet
Aircraft	Total	Introduced	Retired	Notes	Refs
Airbus A300-600R	10	1989	2014		
Airbus A300-600RF	3	1993	2014		
Airbus A310-200	3	1988	2006		
Airbus A310-300	2	1988	1994		
Airbus A318-100	1	2012	2020	Operated for China Eastern Airlines Executive Air.	
Airbus A340-300	5	1996	2012		
Airbus A340-600	5	2003	2015		
Antonov An-24	4	1988	Unknown		
Boeing 737-200	3	2001	2004	Acquired from Air Great Wall	
Boeing 737-300	26	1998	2016		
Boeing 767-300ER	3	2003	2011	Acquired from China Yunnan Airlines and operated by China Eastern Yunnan Airlines.	
Bombardier CRJ-200ER	6	2004	2013	Acquired from China Yunnan Airlines and operated by China Eastern Yunnan Airlines. All aircraft remained in the Yunnan landscape special livery previously painted by China Yunnan Airlines.	
BAe 146-100	6	1988	2003		
BAe 146-300	7	2002	2005	Acquired from China Northwest Airlines	
Embraer ERJ-135	5	2012	2021	Operated for China Eastern Airlines Executive Air.	
Embraer ERJ-145	10	2005	2016		
Fokker 100	10	1992	1999		
Hawker Siddeley Trident	4	1988	Unknown		
Lockheed L-100 Hercules	2	1990	1992		
McDonnell Douglas MD-11	5	1991	2003		
McDonnell Douglas MD-11F	1	1991	2003	Transferred to China Cargo Airlines.	
McDonnell Douglas MD-82	16	1988	2007		
McDonnell Douglas MD-90-30	9	1997	2010		
Short 360	4	1988	1994		
Sikorsky S-76	2	1988	Unknown		
Xian MA-60	3	2002	Unknown	Acquired from Wuhan Airlines.	
Xian Y-7	Unknown	1988	Unknown		
Yakovlev Yak-42	7	1998	Unknown	Acquired from China General Aviation Corporation.	
Yunshuji Y-5	27	1988	Unknown		

=== Special liveries gallery ===
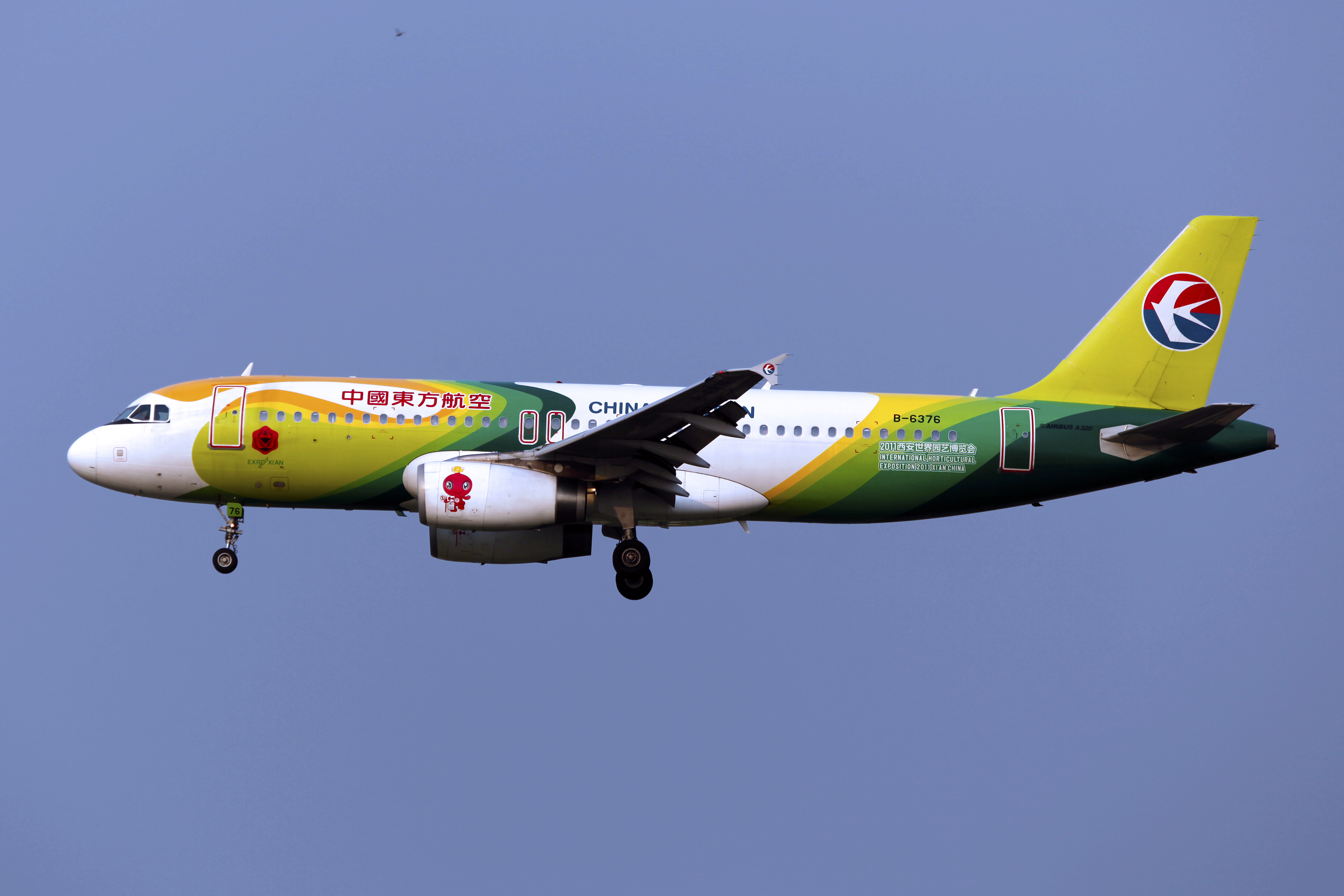
Airbus A320-232 (B-6376) in 2011 Xi'an International Horticultural Expo livery

Airbus A330-343 (B-6129) in Xi'an International Horticultural Expo livery

Boeing 737-89P(WL) (B-1317) in Frozen livery

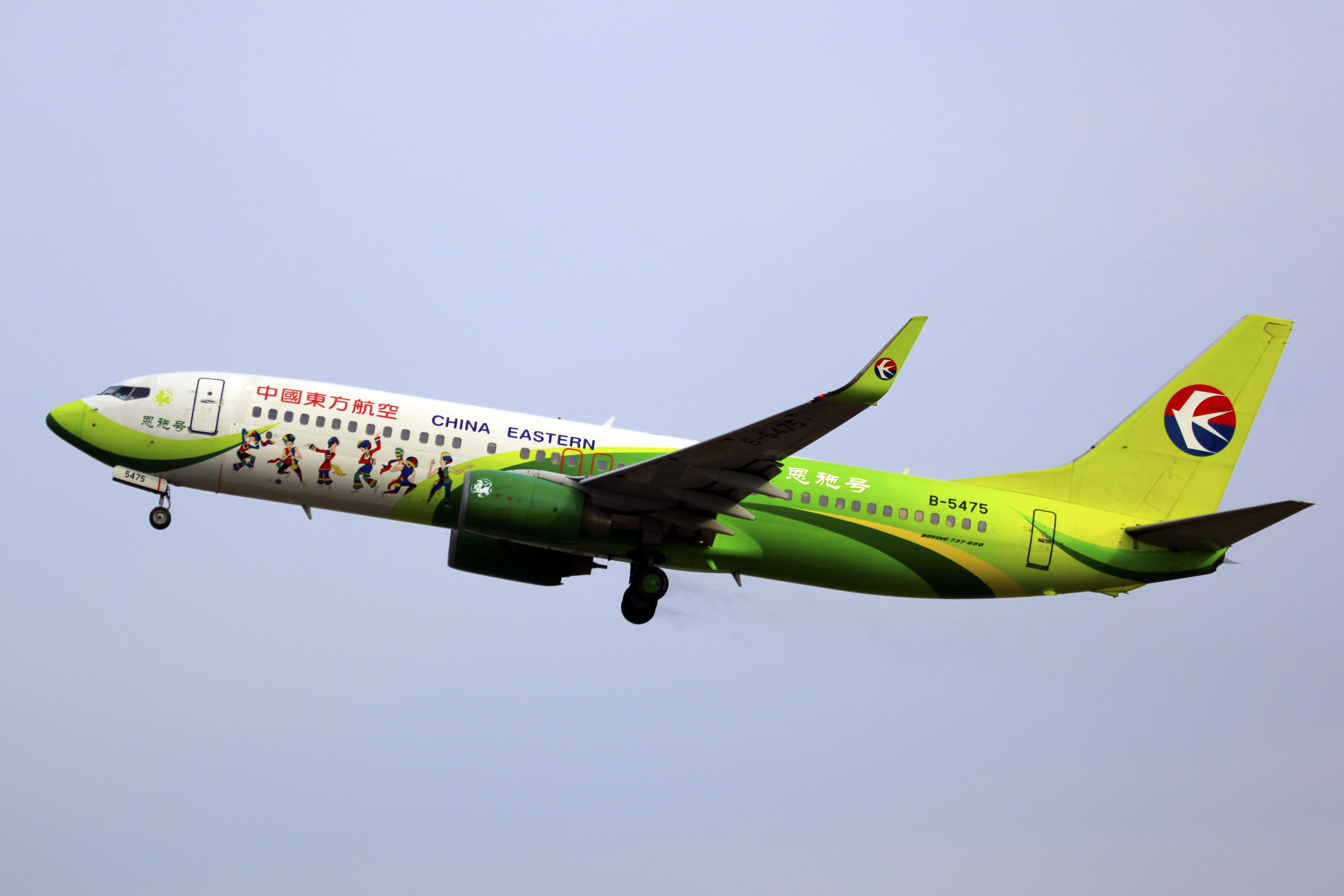
Boeing 737-89P(WL) (B-5475) in Enshi Tujia and Miao Autonomous Prefecture promotional livery

Airbus A330-343X (B-6126) in People's Daily Online livery

Airbus A330-243 (B-6538) in SkyTeam livery

Airbus A330-343 (B-6100) in EXPO 2010 Shanghai China livery

Airbus A330-343 (B-6125) in Xinhua News livery

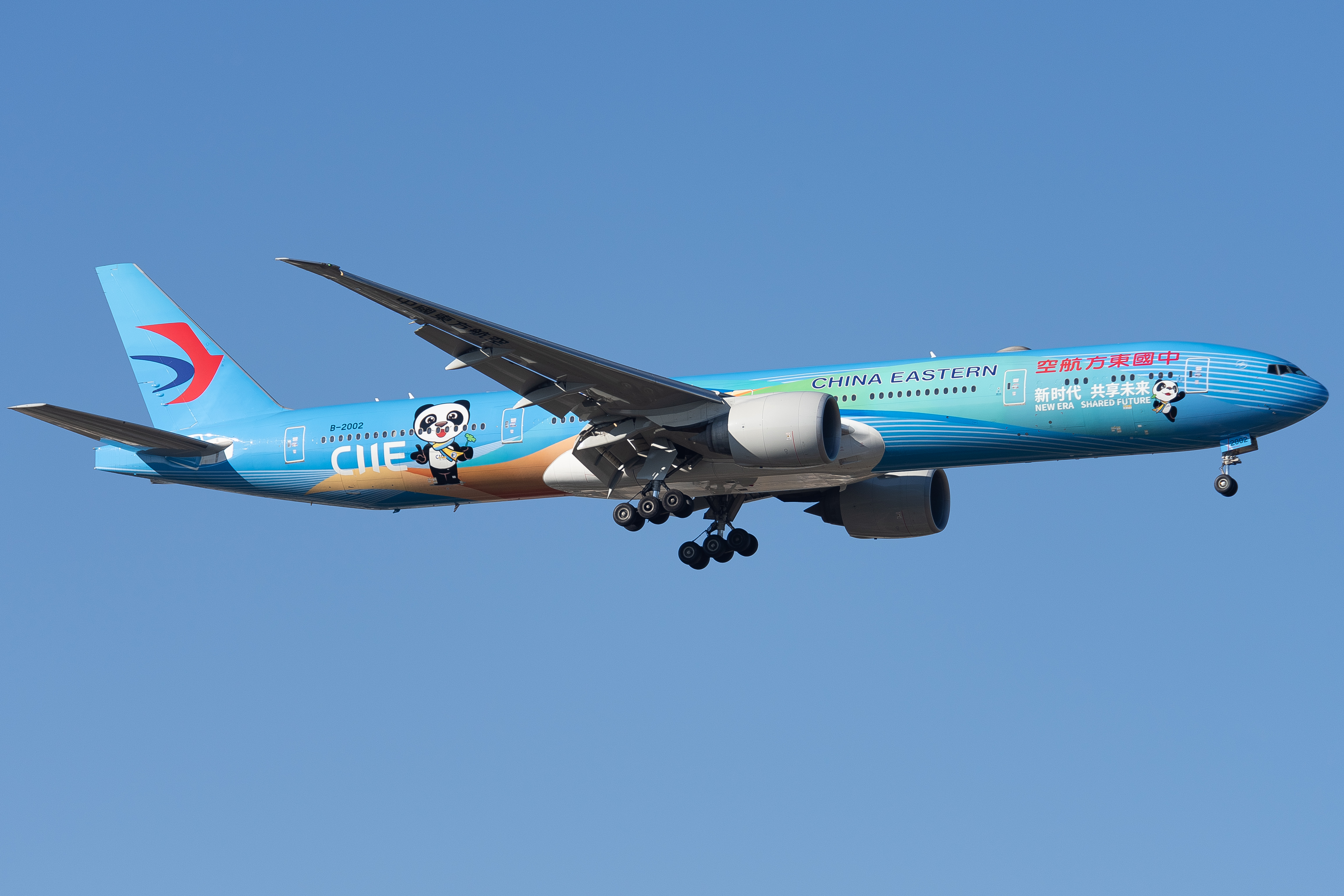
Boeing 777-300ER (B-2002) in China International Import Expo livery

Boeing 737-79P(WL) (B-5822) in Orange Peacock livery

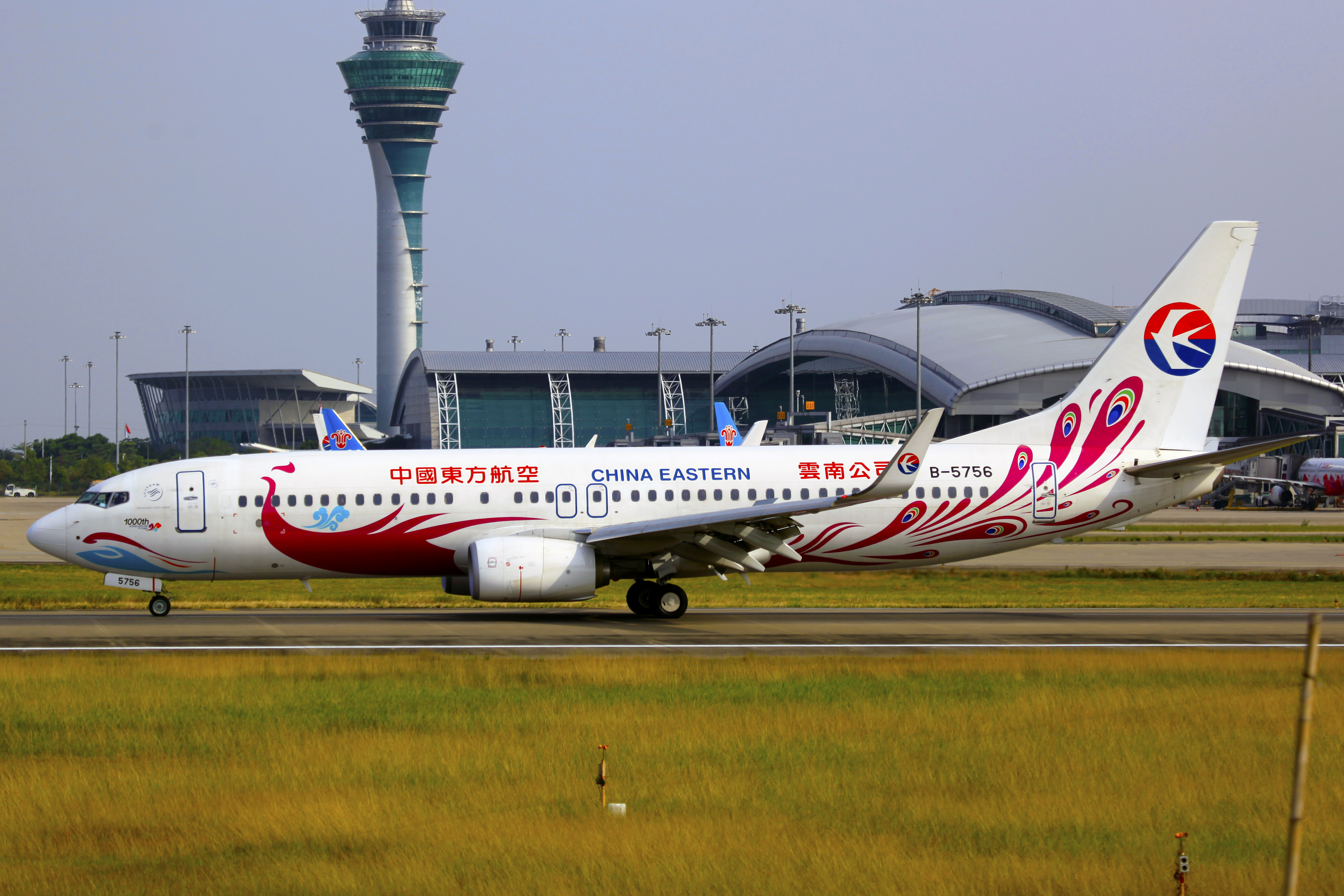
Boeing 737-89P(WL) (B-5756) in Purple Peacock livery

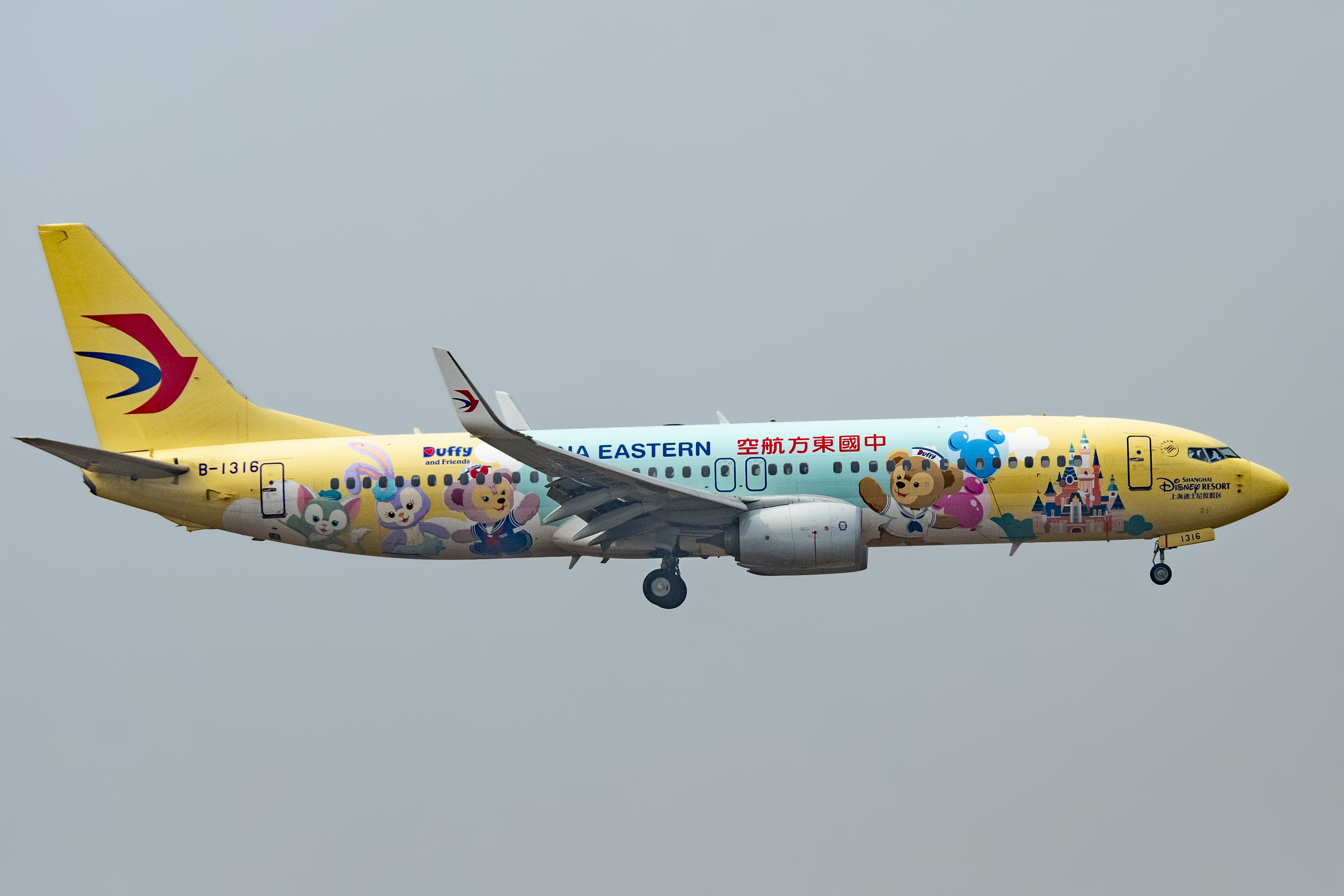
Boeing 737-89P (B-1316) in Duffy the Disney Bear livery

Airbus A330-343 (B-6507) in Shanghai Disney Resort livery

Airbus A320-214 (B-9943) in Magnificent Qinghai livery

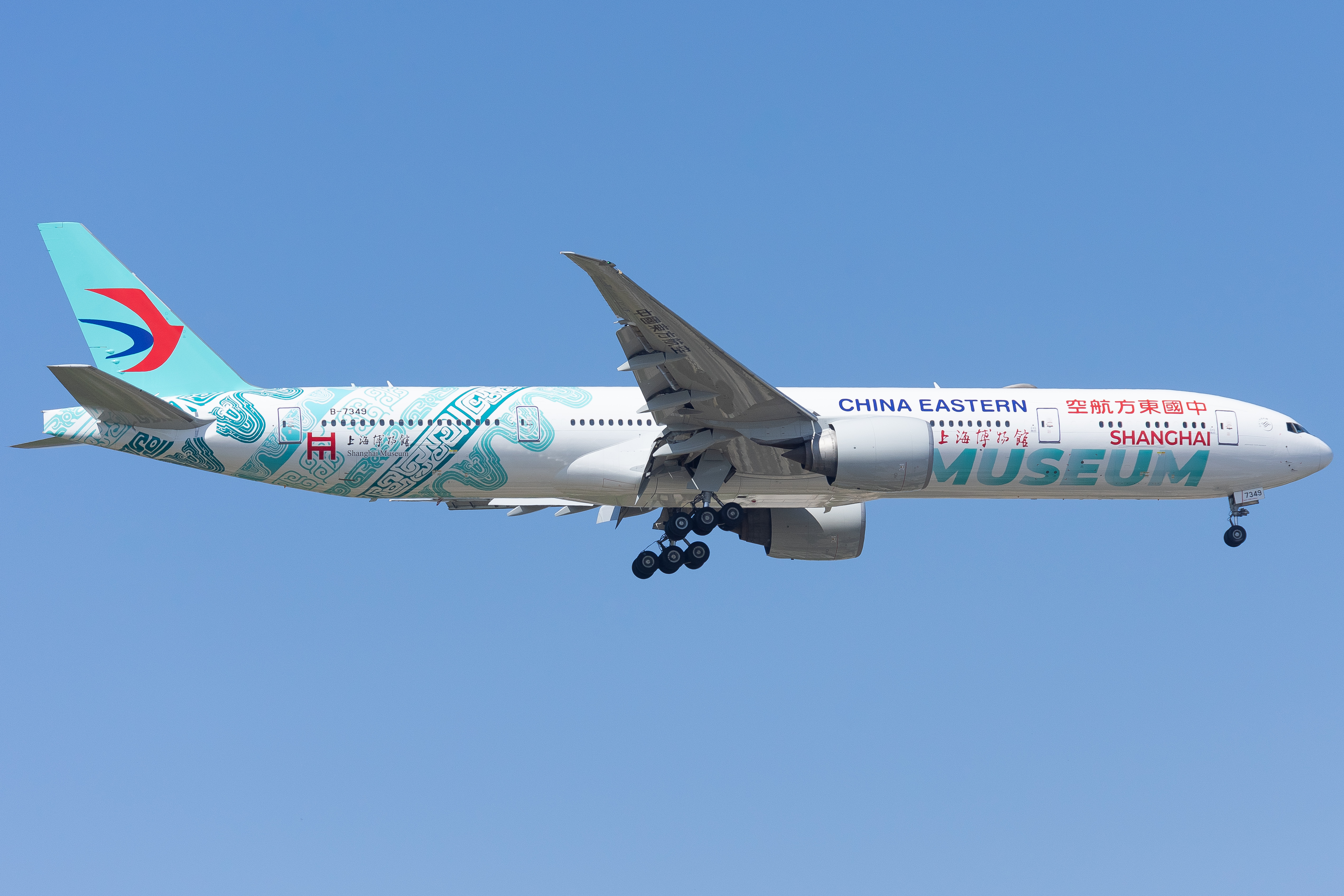
Boeing 777-300ER (B-7349) in Shanghai Museum livery

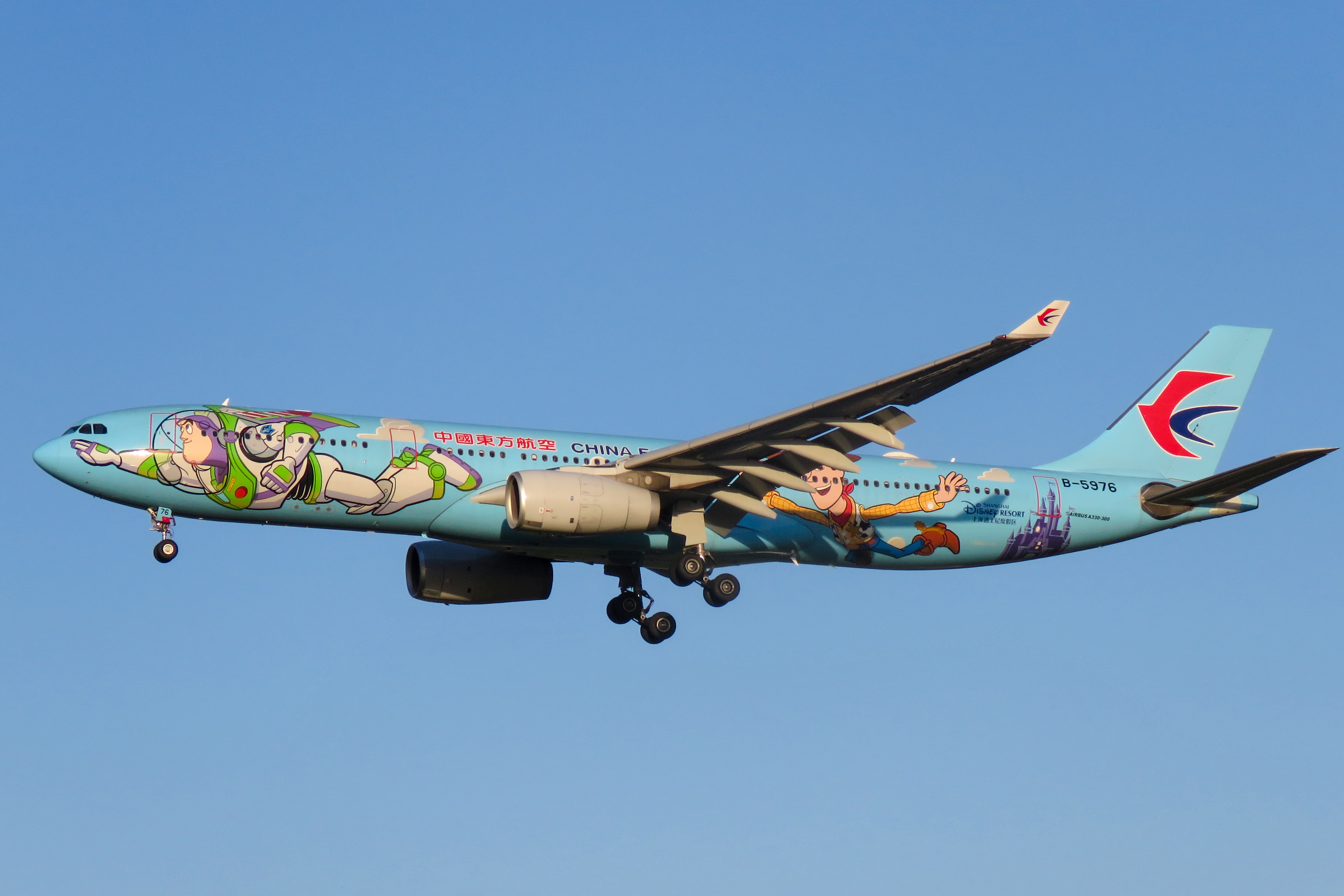
Airbus A330-343 (B-5976) in Toy Story livery

== Services ==
=== Cabins ===
First Class

China Eastern offers first class on Airbus A350s and Boeing 777s. A first class seat comes with a flat bed seat, direct aisle access and a sliding door. The plane also comes with a bar for passengers to serve themselves snacks and socialize with others. Middle seats on the Boeing 777s can be turned into a double bed.

Business Plus/Super Premium Suites

The business plus product can be found on all Airbus A350s and Boeing 787s. The suites come with bigger space along with larger suite length compared to the business class seats. The business plus suites also feature a sliding door and a minibar. The middle seats can be turned into a living room with seating for four.

=== Business Class ===
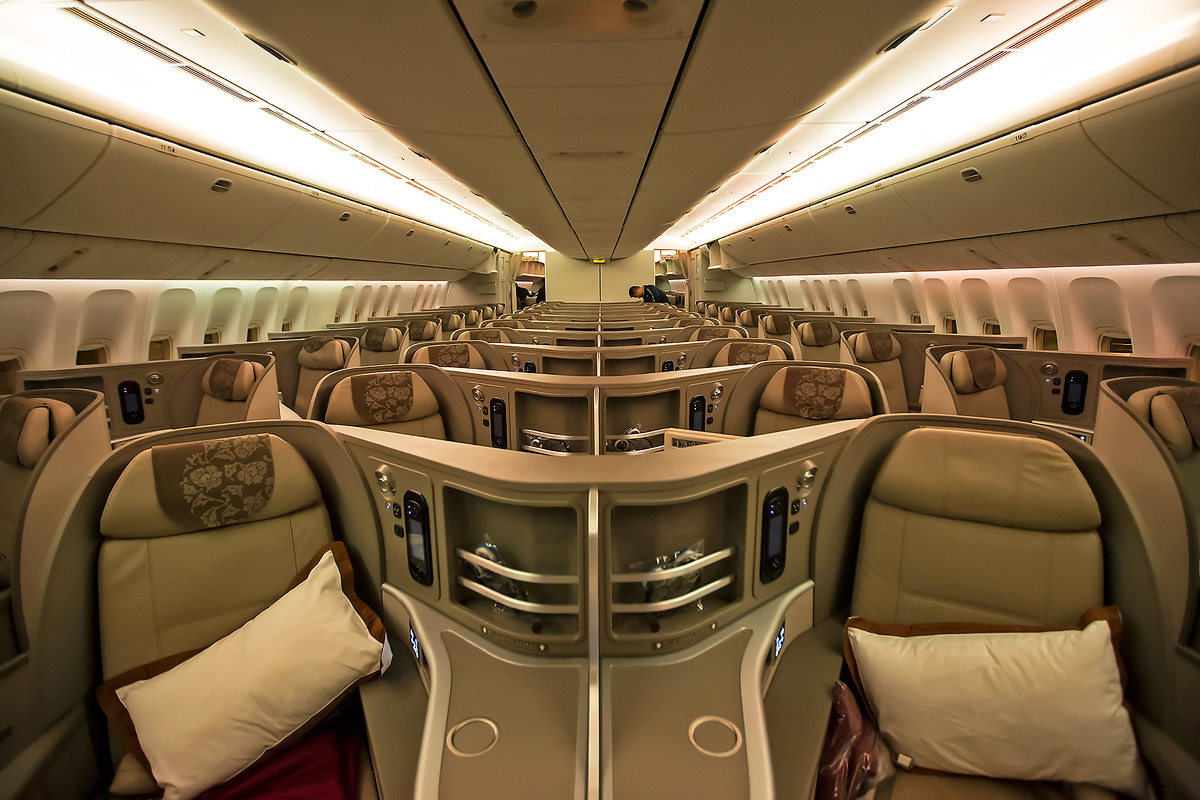
Business class on a Boeing 777-300ER

Business class comes in many different versions. On narrow-body aircraft, business class seats are recliners arranged in a 2-2 configuration. On select Airbus A330s, business class seats are either Zodiac Cirrus or Thompson Vantage XL which is in a 1-2-1 configuration, or angled flat beds or fully flat beds arranged in a 2-2-2 configuration. On Airbus A350s and Boeing 787s, business class seats are modified Thompson Vantage XL with doors similar to Delta One suites. On Boeing 777s, business class seats are Zodiac Cirrus.

Premium Economy Class

Premium Economy class is found on all Airbus A320neos, A350s, Boeing 737 MAXs and Boeing 787s, and select A330-300s and Boeing 737-800s.

Economy Class

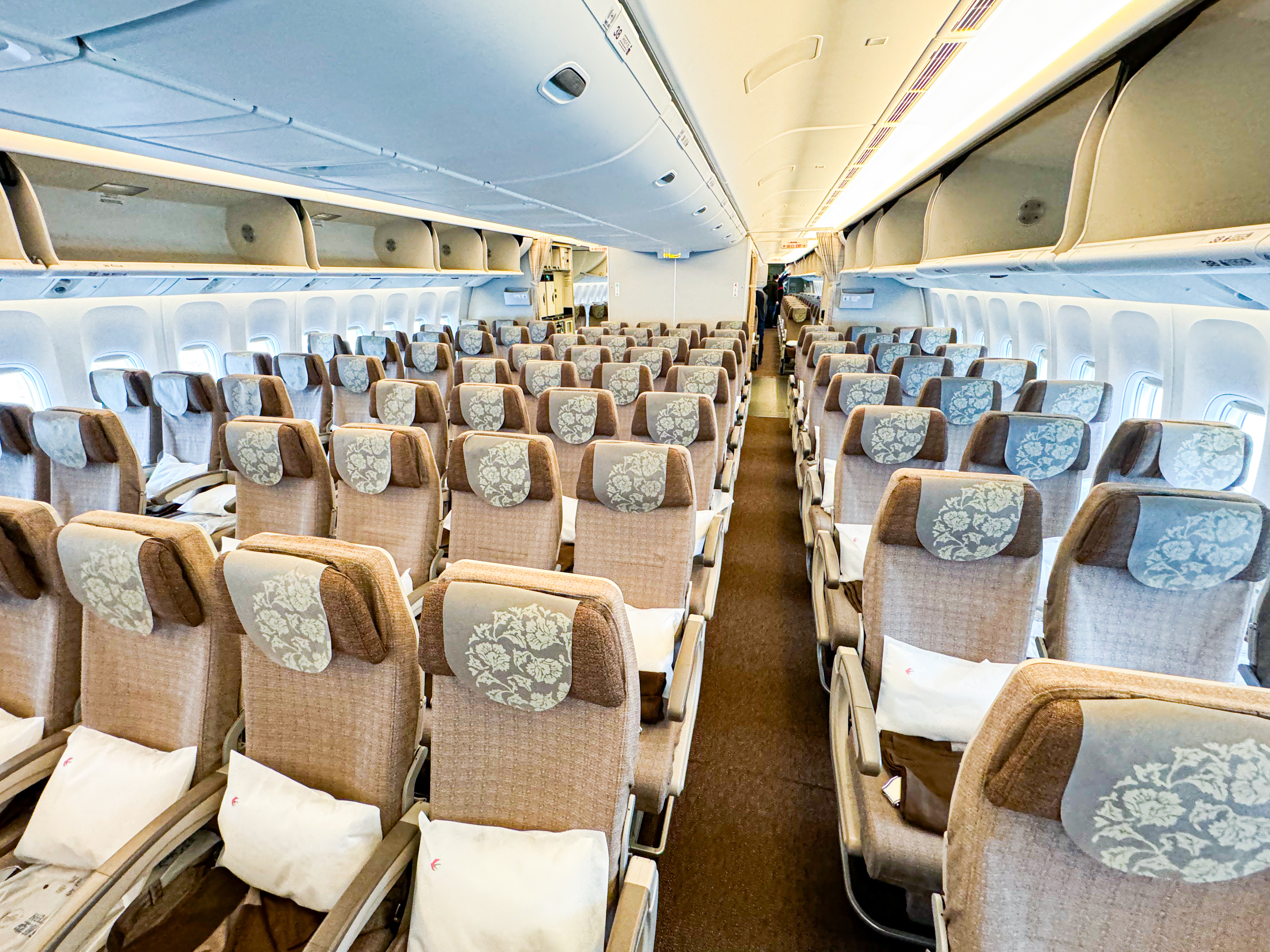
Economy class on a Boeing 777-300ER

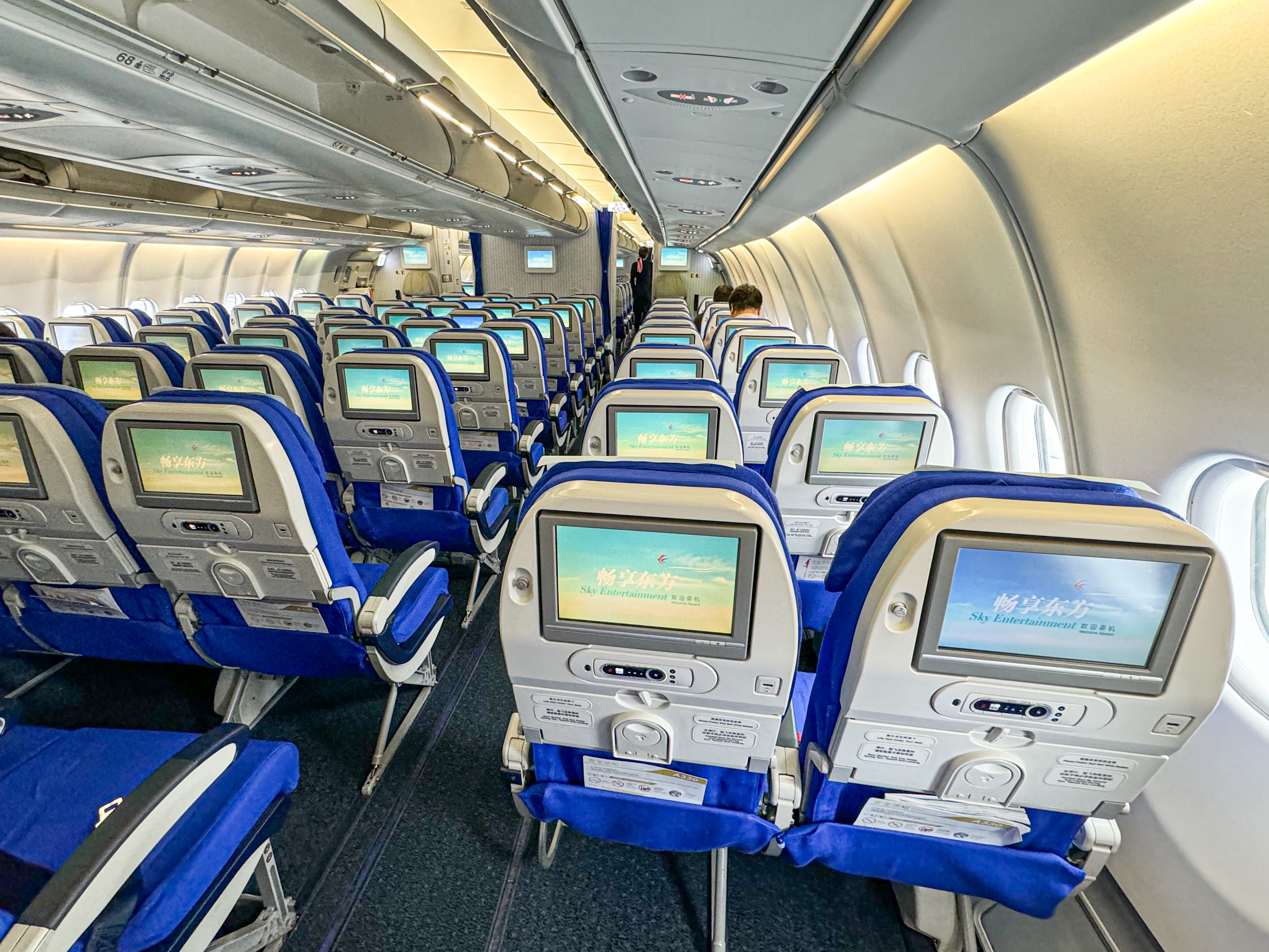
Economy class on an Airbus A330-200

China Eastern offers complimentary meal service, and select wide-body aircraft are equipped with in-flight entertainment.

=== Eastern Miles ===
China Eastern Airlines's frequent-flyer program is called Eastern Miles (simplified Chinese: 东方万里行; traditional Chinese: 東方萬里行). Shanghai Airlines and China United Airlines, China Eastern subsidiaries, are also parts of the program. Eastern Miles members can earn miles on flights as well as through consumption with China Eastern's credit card. Members can be upgraded to Elite membership in three tiers: Platinum, Gold and Silver, when meet minimum spending requirement (essential), enough miles or flying sectors.

=== Onboard Wi-Fi ===
Starting on 3 July 2026, all China Eastern Airlines and Shanghai Airlines flights using wide-body aircraft now provide free Wi-Fi on board for all classes. This is the first airline in China to implement this service.

== Cargo ==
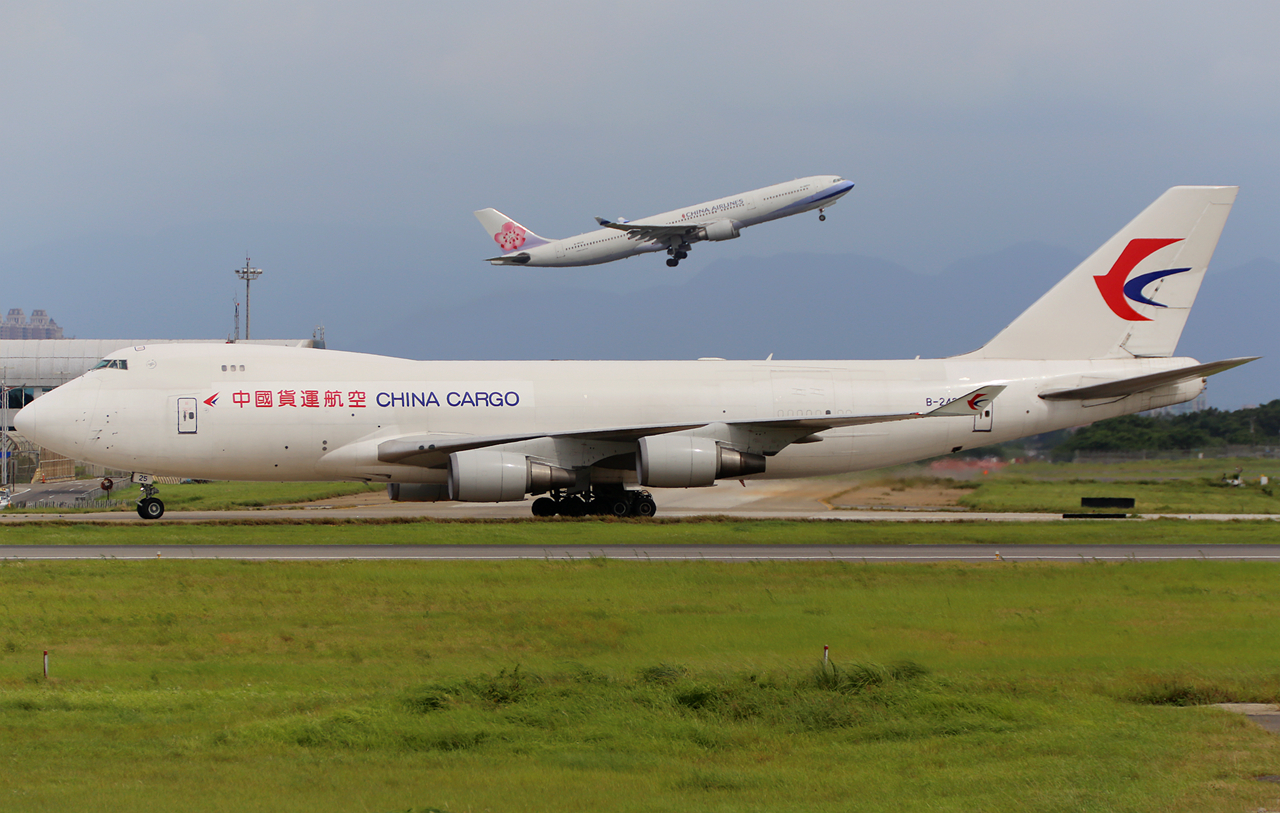
China Cargo Airlines Boeing 747-400ERF

After the merger with Shanghai Airlines, China Eastern Airlines signaled that it would combine the two carriers' cargo subsidiaries as well. The airline's new subsidiary cargo carrier, consisting of the assets of China Cargo Airlines, Great Wall Airlines and Shanghai Airlines Cargo, commenced operations in 2011 from its base in Shanghai, China's largest air cargo market. China Eastern Airlines signed a strategic cooperation framework agreement with Shanghai Airport Group, which controls both Shanghai Hongqiao International Airport and Shanghai Pudong International Airport. The airline will allocate more capacity to Pudong Airport to open more international routes and boost flight frequencies on existing international and domestic trunk routes.

== Incidents and accidents ==
- On 24 April 1989, a passenger hijacked a China Eastern Xian Y-7 en route from Ningbo to Xiamen. The hijacker, armed with a dagger and carrying dynamite, stabbed a flight attendant and demanded to be flown to Taiwan. The pilot diverted to Fuzhou instead. When the hijacker realized that he had been tricked, he blew himself up, injuring two people in the process.
- On 15 August 1989, Flight 5510 (B-3437), operating a domestic flight from Shanghai to Nanchang, crashed on takeoff following an unexplained failure of the right engine, killing 34 of 40 people on board.
- On 6 April 1993, Flight 583, a McDonnell-Douglas MD-11 flying from Beijing to Los Angeles via Shanghai, had an inadvertent deployment of the leading edge wing slats while cruising. The aircraft progressed through several violent pitch oscillations and lost 5,000 feet (1,500 m) of altitude. Two passengers were killed, and 149 passengers and seven crew members were injured. The aircraft landed safely in Shemya, Alaska, United States.
- On 26 October 1993, Flight 5398 from Shenzhen to Fuzhou, a McDonnell Douglas MD-82 overshot the runway and crashed at Fuzhou Yixu Airport after a failed attempt to go around on approach, killing two of 80 on board.
- On 10 September 1998, Flight 586, a McDonnell-Douglas MD-11 flying from Shanghai Hongqiao International Airport to Beijing Capital International Airport, suffered a nose gear failure after take-off. The aircraft landed back in Shanghai with the nose gear up on a foamed runway. There were only nine reported injuries. The incident became the inspiration for the 1999 movie Crash Landing, directed by Zhang Jianya, which premiered on the 50th anniversary of the National Day of the People's Republic of China.
- On 21 November 2004, Flight 5210, a Bombardier CRJ-200LR, crashed shortly after takeoff from Baotou Airport due to wing icing, killing all 53 on board and two people on the ground.
- On 21 March 2022, Flight 5735 (operated by China Eastern Yunnan Airlines), a Boeing 737-89P flying from Kunming Changshui International Airport to Guangzhou Baiyun International Airport, nose dived from 29,100 feet and crashed straight into a mountainous region in Molang Village, Teng County, Guangxi, killing all 123 passengers and 9 crew.

== See also ==
- Civil aviation in China
- List of airlines of the People's Republic of China
- List of airports in China
- List of companies of the People's Republic of China
- Transport in China
- China Cargo Airlines (Cargo King)
