= Air Great Wall =

Chinese former airline

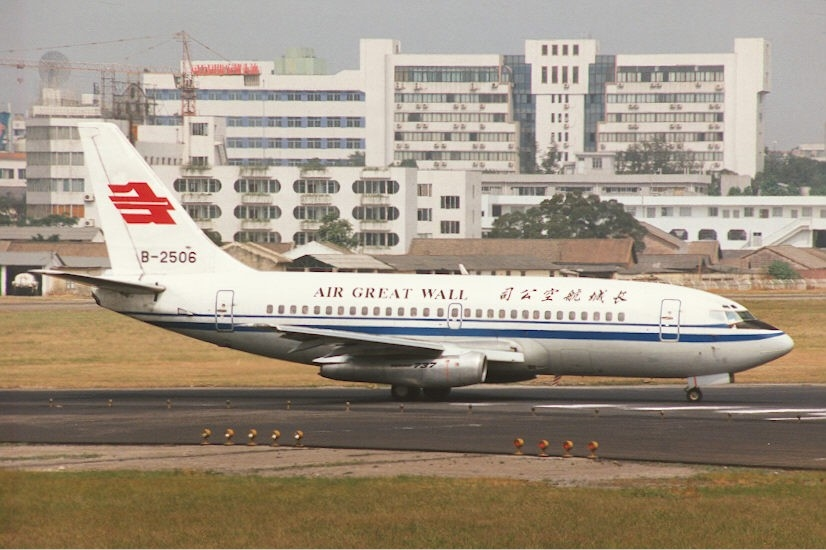
IATA	ICAO	Call sign
G8	GCW	GREAT WALL
- Founded: 1992
- Ceased operations: June 2001
- Hubs: Chongqing then Ningbo
- Fleet size: 3
- Destinations: 8
- Parent company: CAAC Flying Collage

Air Great Wall was a Chinese airline based in Chongqing and later in Ningbo. It never saw much growth throughout its history. It was one of the lesser documented carriers in China and would get swallowed up by China Eastern Airlines.

== History ==
Air Great Wall was founded by the CAAC Flying collage in November of 1992 with a pair of TU 154 aircraft. It was initially based Guanghan in Sichuan. Outside of the logo, the TU-154s bore a livery very similar to Aeroflot. The TU 154 fleet was obsolete but cheap, which is why it was chosen. The aircraft that replaced the TU 154s were a fleet of 3 737-200 aircraft, which were the last Air China 737-200 aircraft in service; all 3 of them were built in 1985 and had the 2T4 Boeing customer code, which suggested that they were bound for Air Florida that for whatever reason weren't. In 1997 Air Great Wall moved its headquarters to Ningbo. In 2001, Air Great Wall was integrated into China Eastern Airlines. China Eastern recorded profits in 2002, one year after taking over Air Great Wall.

== Fleet ==
Air Great Wall fleet
Plane	Number of	Service period	notes
TU 154	2	1992-1995	
737-200	3	1995-2001	

== Destinations ==
- Chongqing
- Ningbo
- Beijing
- Guangzhou
- Haikou
- Shanghai
- Shenzhen
- Wenzhou
