= China Eastern Yunnan Airlines =

Chinese airline

China Eastern Yunnan Airlines 东方航空云南公司

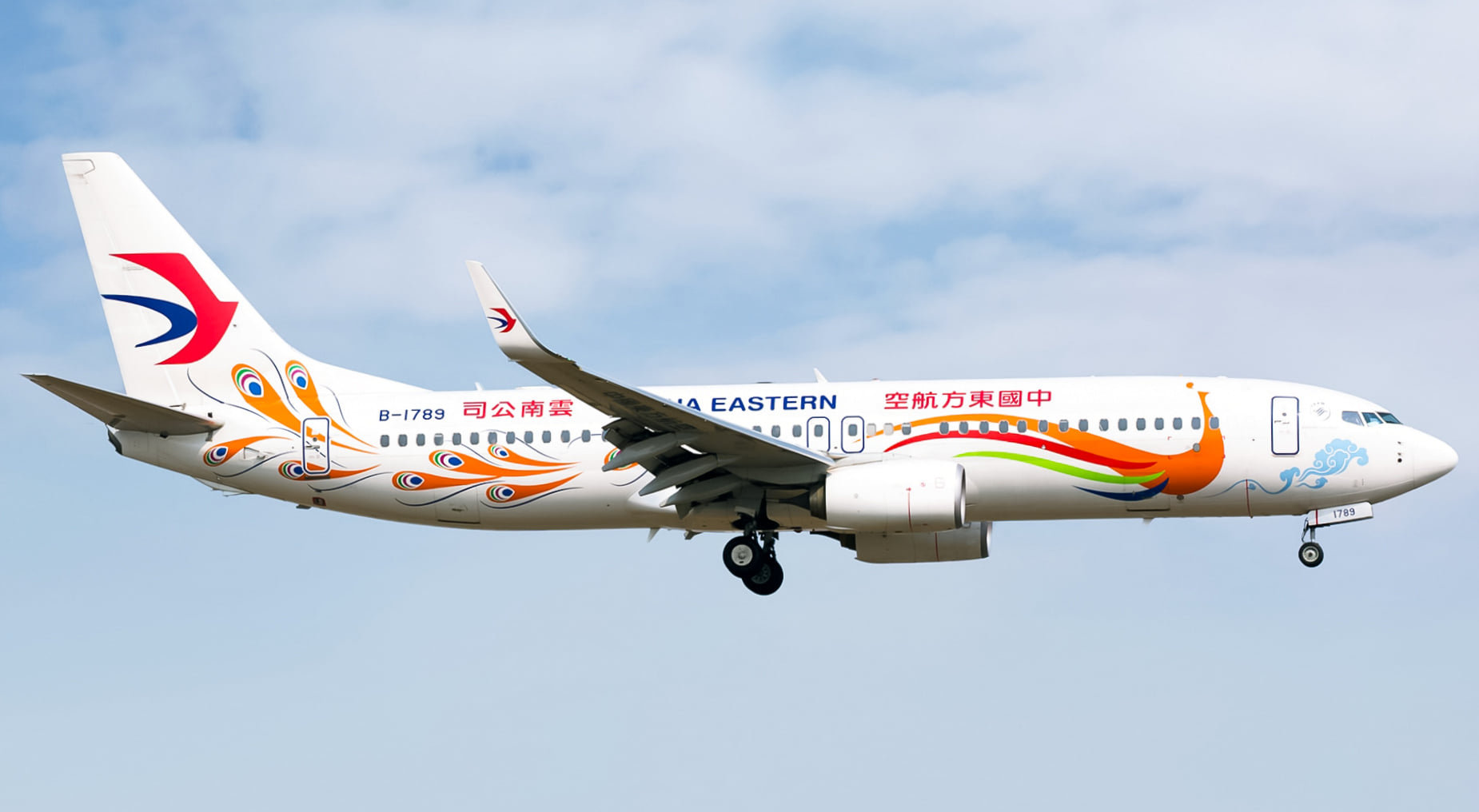
- China Eastern Yunnan Airlines Boeing 737-800 in orange Yunnan Peacock livery
| IATA | ICAO | Call sign |
|---|---|---|
| MU | CES | CHINA EASTERN |
- Founded: 1992; 34 years ago (as China Yunnan Airlines)
- Commenced operations: 2003; 23 years ago (as China Eastern Airlines Yunnan Branch); 2011; 15 years ago (as China Eastern Yunnan Airlines)
- Ceased operations: 2026; 0 years ago (merged into China Eastern Airlines)
- Hubs: Kunming Changshui International Airport
- Frequent-flyer program: Eastern Miles
- Alliance: SkyTeam (affiliate)
- Fleet size: 83
- Destinations: 88
- Parent company: China Eastern Airlines
- Headquarters: Kunming, Yunnan, China
- Website: www.c3q.com.cn

China Yunnan Airlines
| IATA | ICAO | Call sign |
|---|---|---|
| 3Q | CYH | YUNNAN |
- Founded: 1992
- Ceased operations: 2003 (merged into China Eastern Airlines)
- Hubs: Kunming Wujiaba International Airport
- Headquarters: Kunming, Yunnan, China

China Eastern Yunnan Airlines (simplified Chinese: 东方航空云南公司; traditional Chinese: 東方航空雲南公司; pinyin: Dōngfāng Hángkōng Yúnnán Gōngsī) was an airline based in Kunming, Yunnan, China. It was a subsidiary of China Eastern Airlines, and was formerly known as China Yunnan Airlines (simplified Chinese: 中国云南航空公司; traditional Chinese: 中國雲南航空公司; pinyin: Zhōngguó Yúnnán Hángkōng Gōngsī), whose headquarters were on the property of Wujiaba Airport.

== History ==
Founded in 1992, the airline was based in Kunming Wujiaba International Airport in Yunnan province and operated a fleet of Bombardier CRJ-200, Boeing 737-300 and Boeing 767-300 aircraft before the merger with China Eastern Airlines. China Yunnan Airlines operated mostly domestic flights from Kunming to major Chinese cities and also provided international services to Hong Kong, Singapore, Thailand and Laos.

In 2003, China Yunnan Airlines and China Northwest Airlines were merged into China Eastern Airlines, with Yunnan Airlines becoming its Yunnan Branch (Chinese: 中国东方航空云南分公司). All the airliners were transferred to China Eastern Airlines and now painted in parent company's livery.

From 31 March 2008 to 1 April 2008, 21 flights of Yunnan Branch returned unexpectedly due to the dissatisfaction of some pilots with the company's treatment, causing at least 1,500 passengers to be affected by the flight.

In 2011, Yunnan Branch became China Eastern Yunnan Airlines, which was co-founded by China Eastern Airlines and Yunnan Communications Investment & Constructions Group (Chinese: 云南省交通投资建设集团), with all its fleet painted in its parent company's livery with only slight modifications which includes the Yunnan title.

In 2026, China Eastern Yunnan's operating system was merged into China Eastern Airlines Corporation Limited. On 29 June 2026, the Civil Aviation Administration of Southwest China revoked its Domestic Carrier Dangerous Goods Air Transport Permit. Then, on 6 July, at the request of China Eastern Yunnan, the authority revoked its CCAR-121 operating certificate and corresponding operating specifications. As a result, China Eastern Yunnan no longer operates as an independent CCAR-121 certificate holder, as its flight operations have been fully incorporated into the single operating system of its parent, China Eastern Airlines Corporation Limited.

== Branding and livery ==
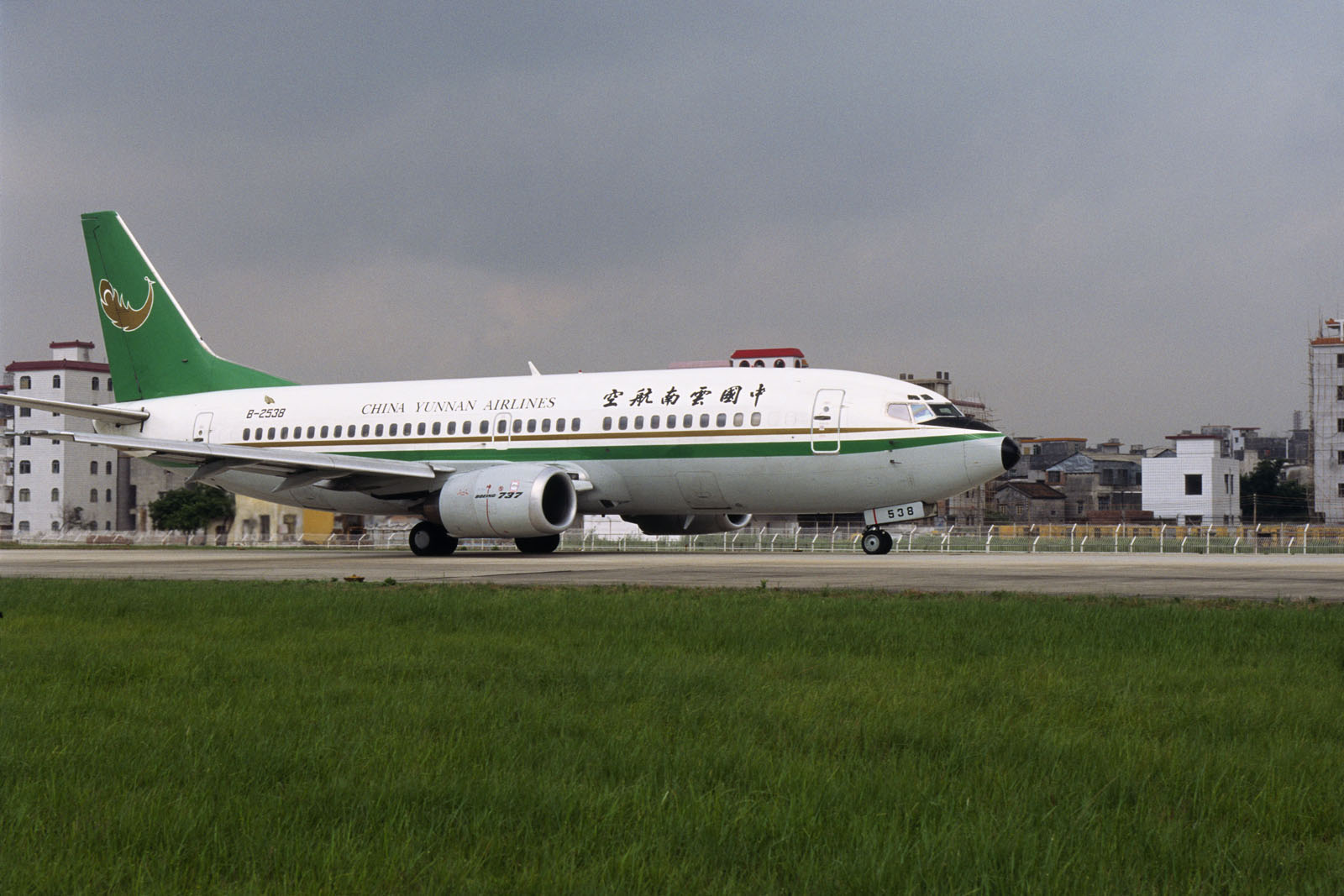
China Yunnan Airlines Boeing 737-300

The livery of China Eastern Yunnan Airlines is slightly different from that of China Eastern Airlines. The aircraft livery is consistent with the traditional livery of China Eastern Airlines, but with the text "云南公司" (Yunnan Company) being added after the Chinese and English text of "China Eastern Airlines". After the transition to Kunming Changshui International Airport, China Eastern Airlines Yunnan introduced and painted their aircraft with the Orange or Purple peacock liveries, including Boeing 737-700, Boeing 737-800 and Airbus A330-300.

Previously, the "Green Peacock" logo representing the former China Yunnan Airlines had been added to the front of the aircraft fuselages. Since 2014, China Eastern Yunnan Airlines has successively launched a new livery of China Eastern Airlines, and the original "Green Peacock" pattern has since been removed.

On the afternoon of 1 April 2013, China's 1000th Boeing passenger plane, registered B-5756, landed at Kunming Changshui International Airport and settled in with China Eastern Yunnan Airlines. The fuselage of the plane was painted with the purple peacock livery, and the words "1000TH BOEING AIRPLANE FOR CHINA" was specially printed on the front of the fuselage.

China Eastern Yunnan Airline's liveries

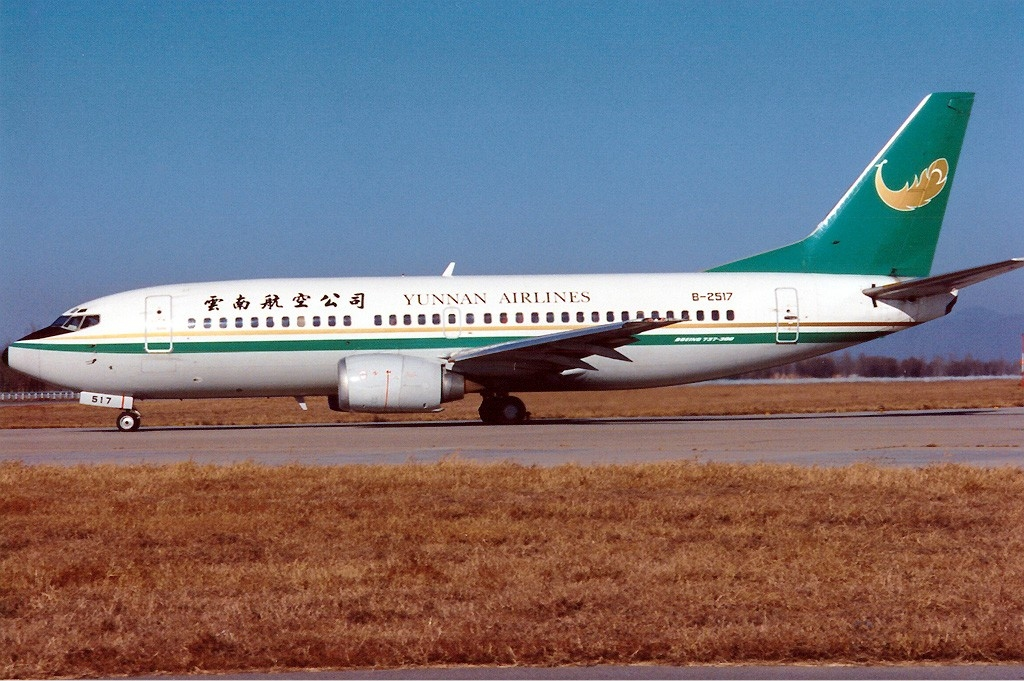
Original China Yunnan Airlines livery

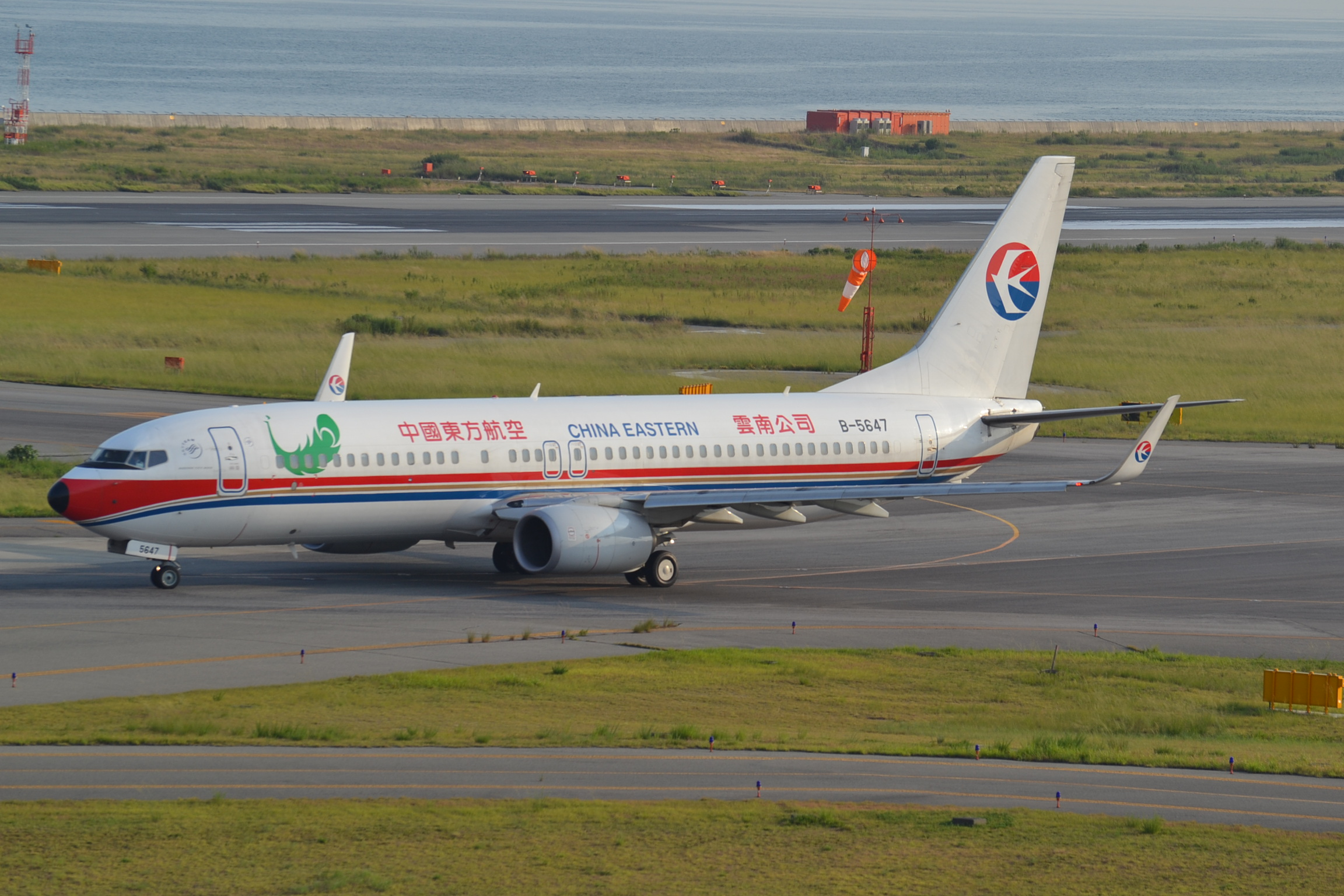
Standard pre-2014 China Eastern Yunnan livery

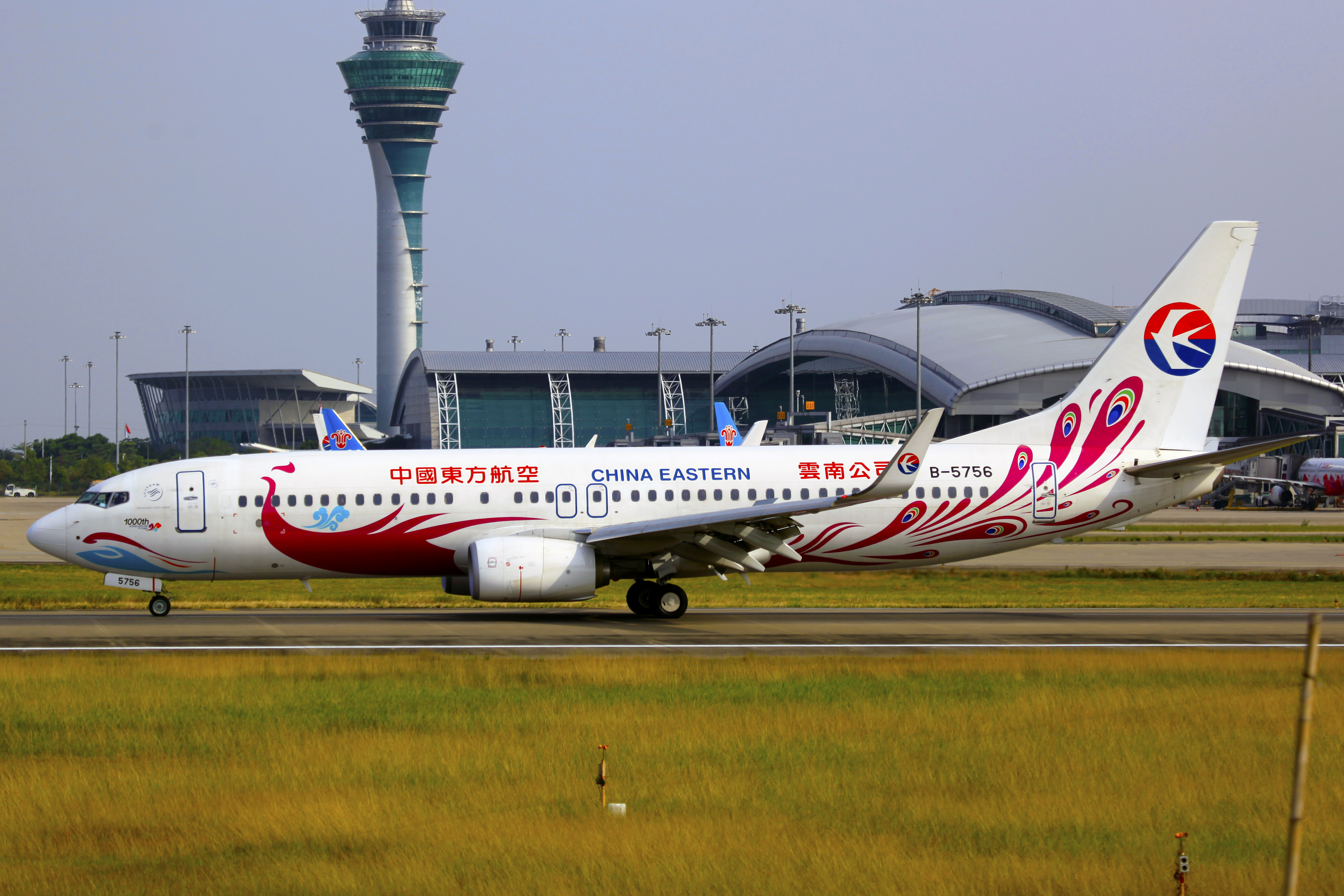
Purple Peacock livery

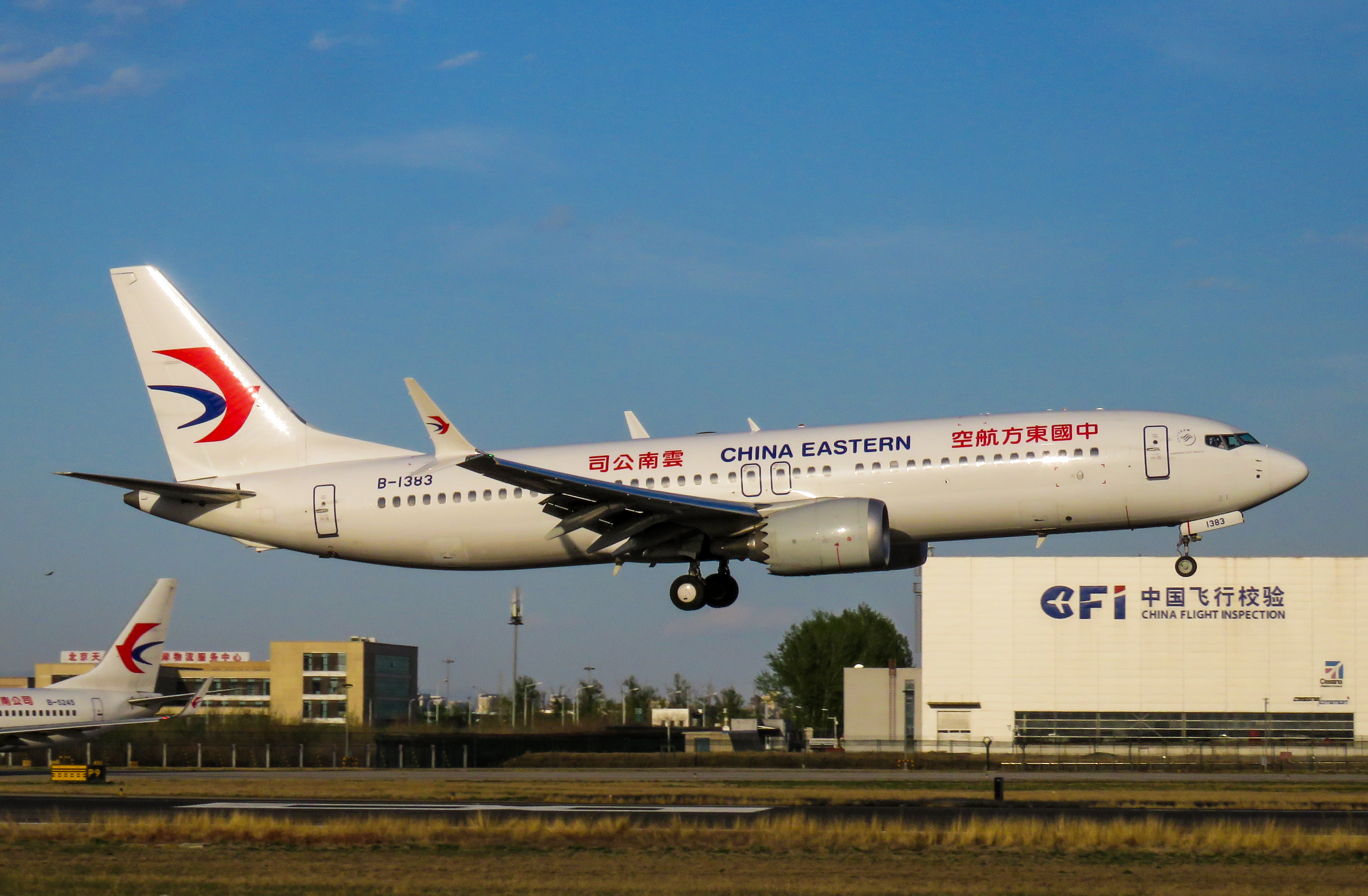
Standard post-2014 China Eastern Yunnan livery

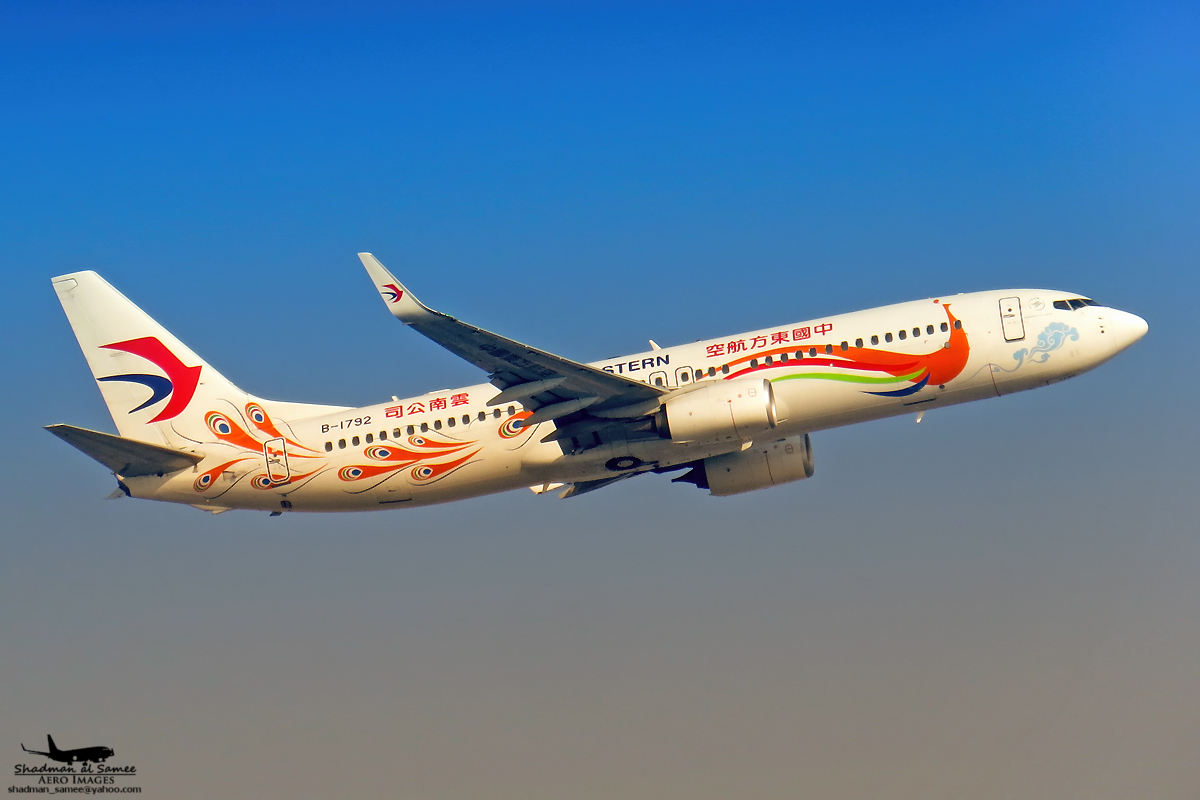
Orange Peacock livery

== Fleet ==
=== Current ===
As of October 2024, China Eastern Yunnan Airlines operated the following aircraft:

China Eastern Yunnan Airlines fleet
| Aircraft | In service | Orders | Notes |
|---|---|---|---|
| Boeing 737-700 | 34 | — | |
| Boeing 737-800 | 35 | — | |
| Boeing 737 MAX 8 | 3 | — | |
| Boeing 787-9 | 3 | 1 | |
| Total | 75 | 1 | |

China Eastern Yunnan Airlines current fleet

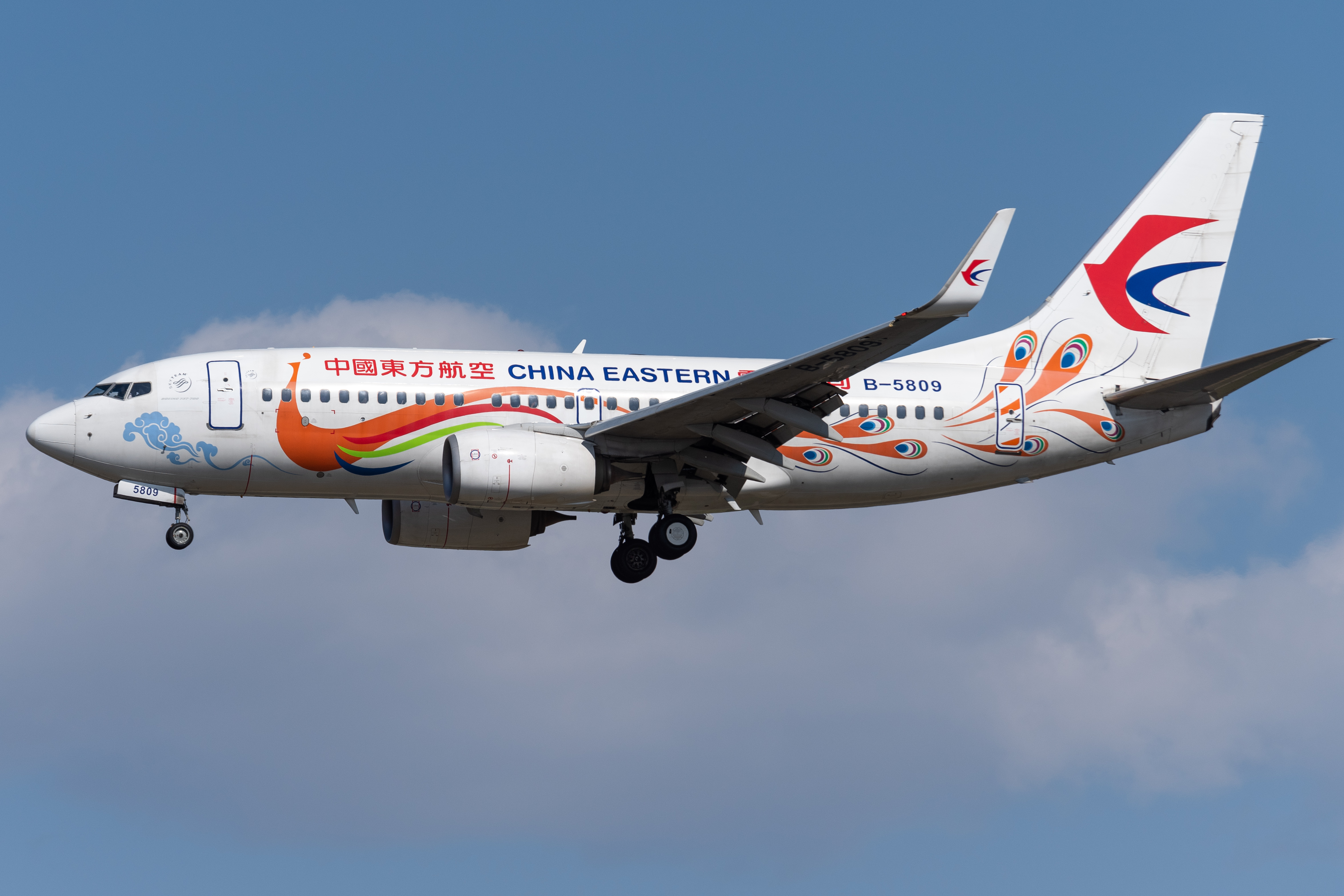
China Eastern Yunnan Airlines Boeing 737-700 in 2020 wearing the Orange Peacock livery

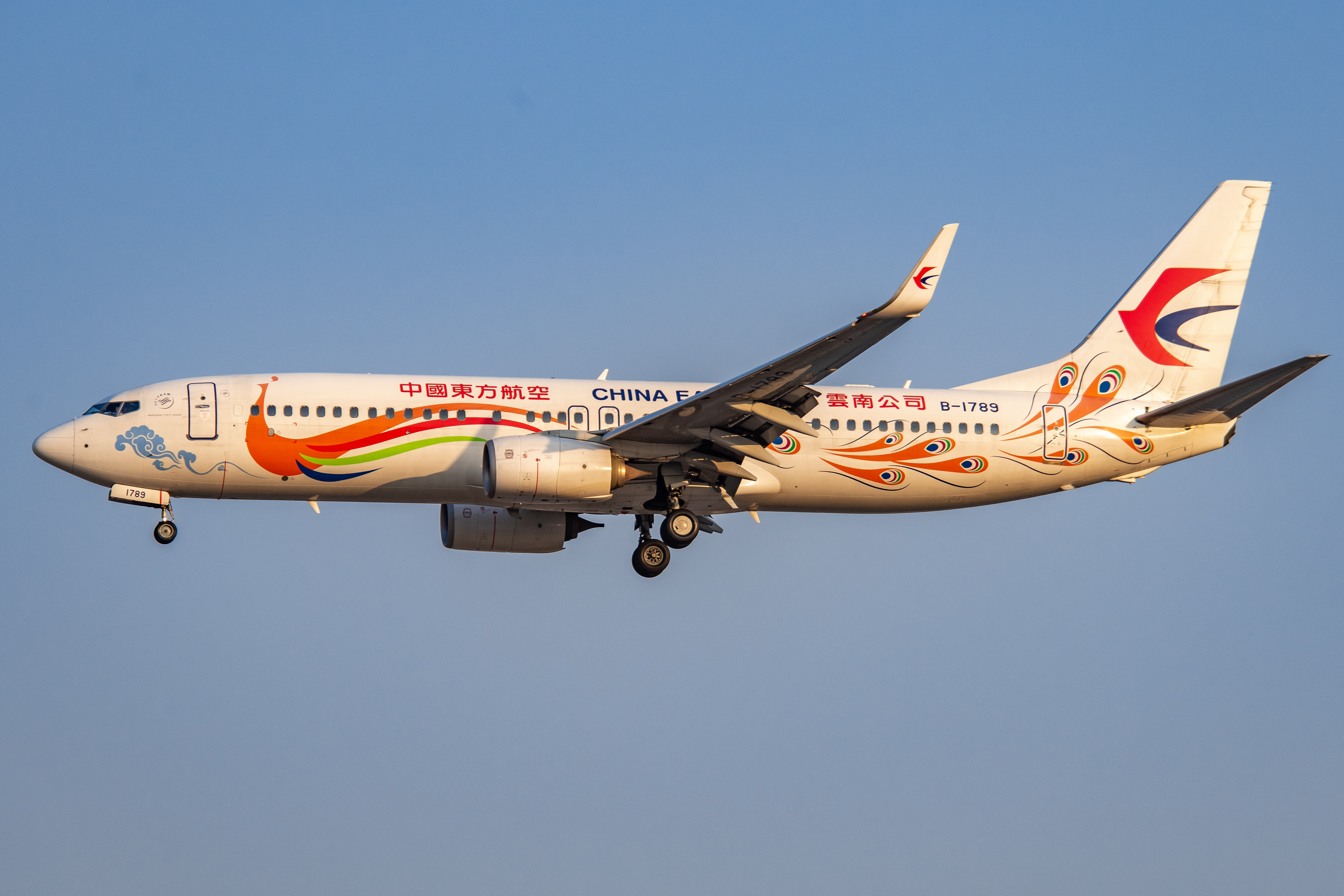
China Eastern Yunnan Airlines Boeing 737-800 in 2019 wearing the Orange Peacock livery

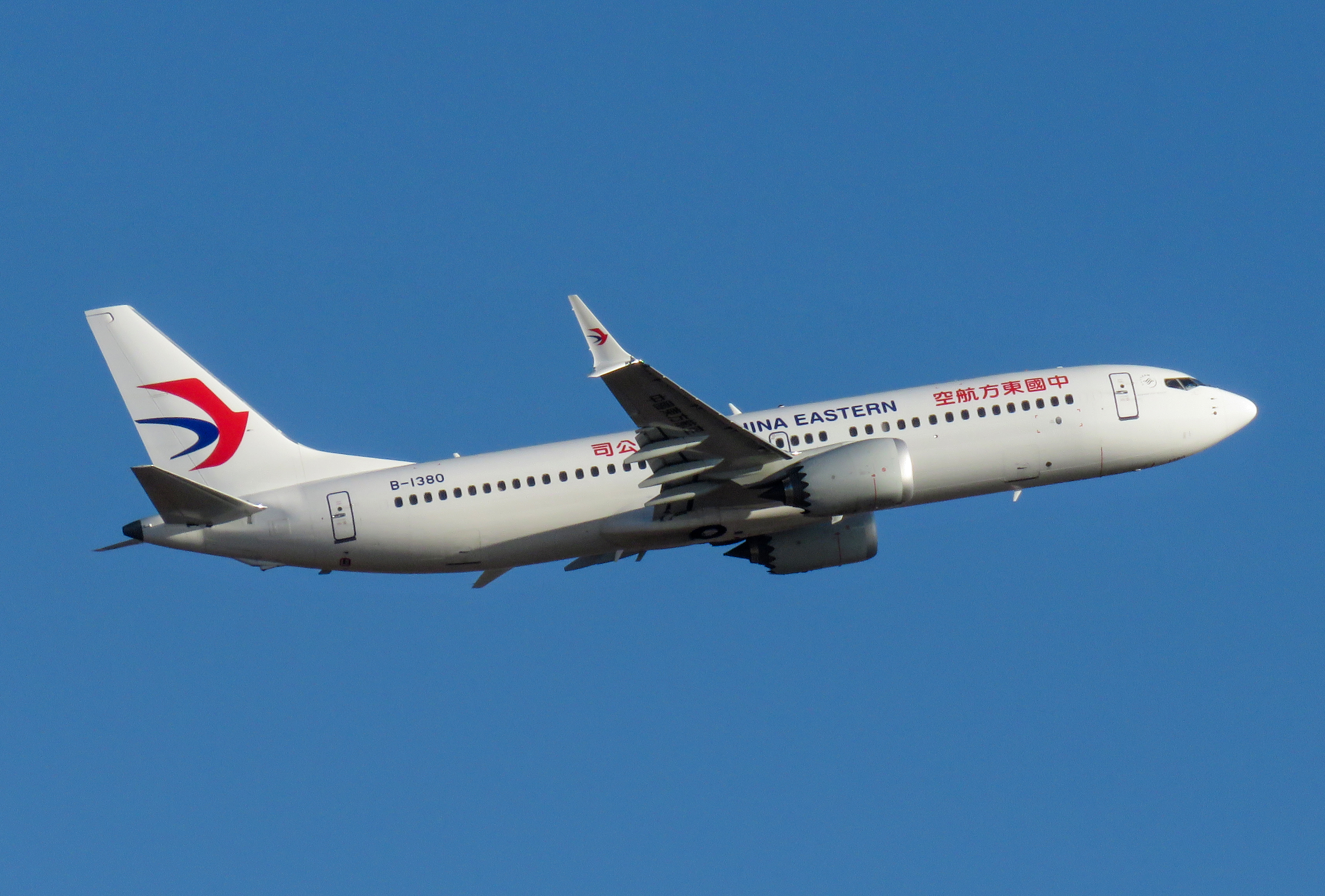
China Eastern Yunnan Airlines Boeing 737 MAX 8 in 2018 wearing the standard China Eastern livery

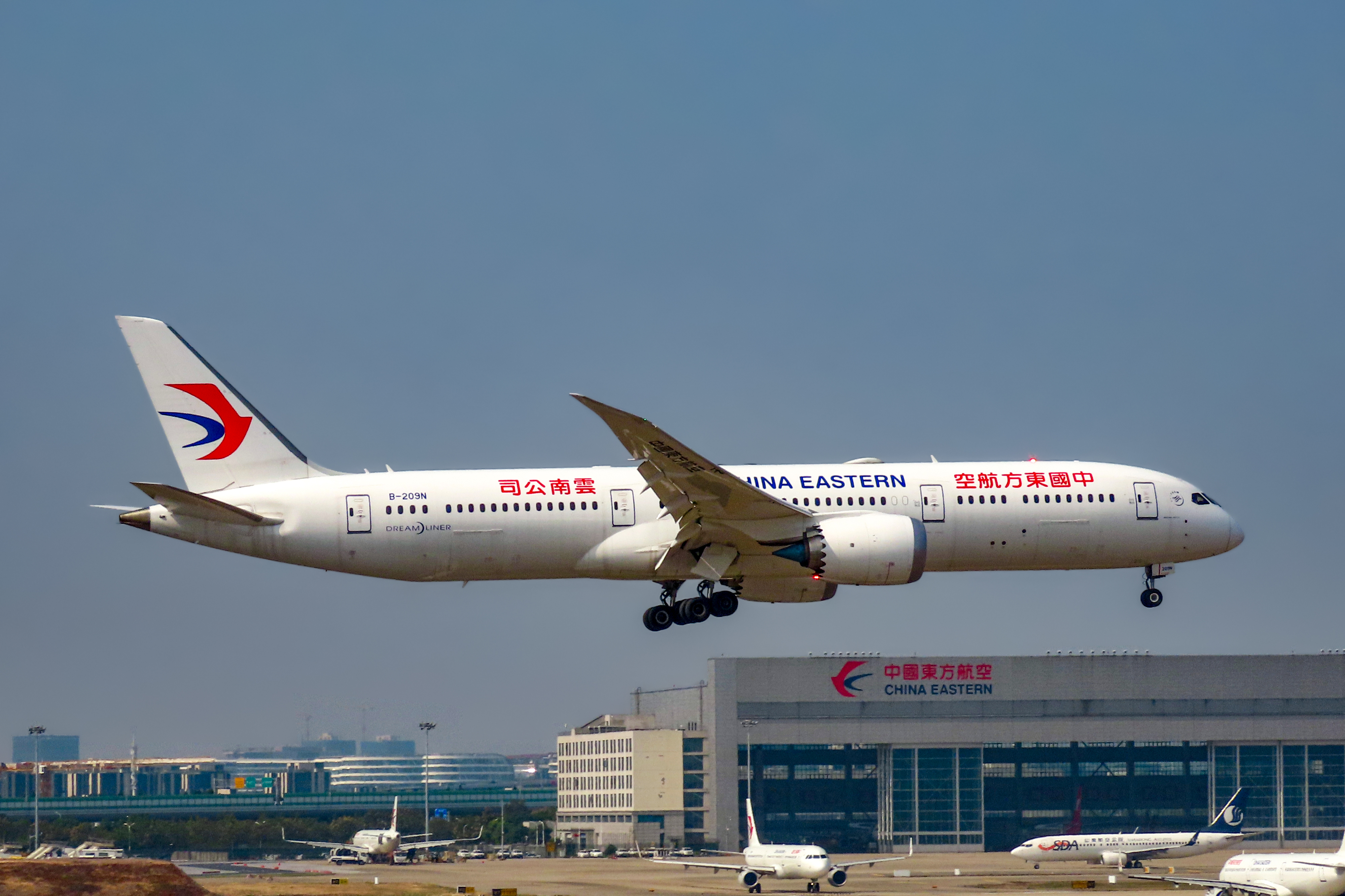
China Eastern Yunnan Airlines Boeing 787-9 in 2019 wearing the standard China Eastern livery

=== Former ===
China Eastern Yunnan Airlines and China Yunnan Airlines also previously operated the following aircraft:

China Eastern Yunnan Airlines retired fleet
| Aircraft | Total | Introduced | Retired | Notes |
|---|---|---|---|---|
| Airbus A330-200 | 3 | 2014 | 2019 | Transferred to China Eastern Airlines. |
| Boeing 737-300 | 10 | 1992 | 2016 | |
| Boeing 767-300ER | 3 | 1996 | 2011 | One of 2 brand-new customers with Rolls-Royce RB211 engines along with British Airways. 2 aircraft currently operating for Eastern Airlines, LLC. |
| Bombardier CRJ200 | 5 | 2001 | 2016 | B-3072 crashed in China Eastern Airlines Flight 5210 |

China Eastern Yunnan Airlines former fleet

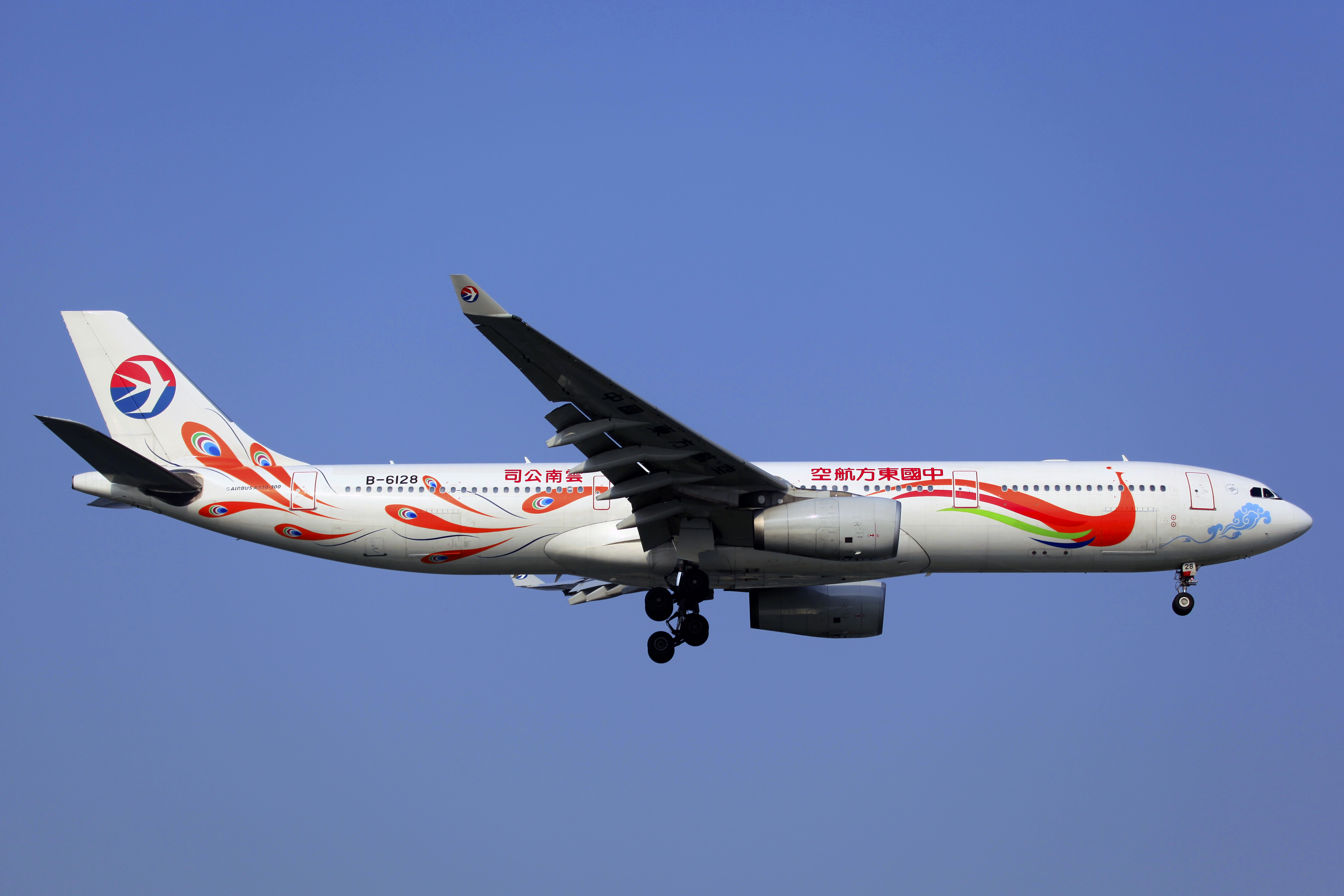
China Eastern Yunnan Airlines Airbus A330-300 in 2013

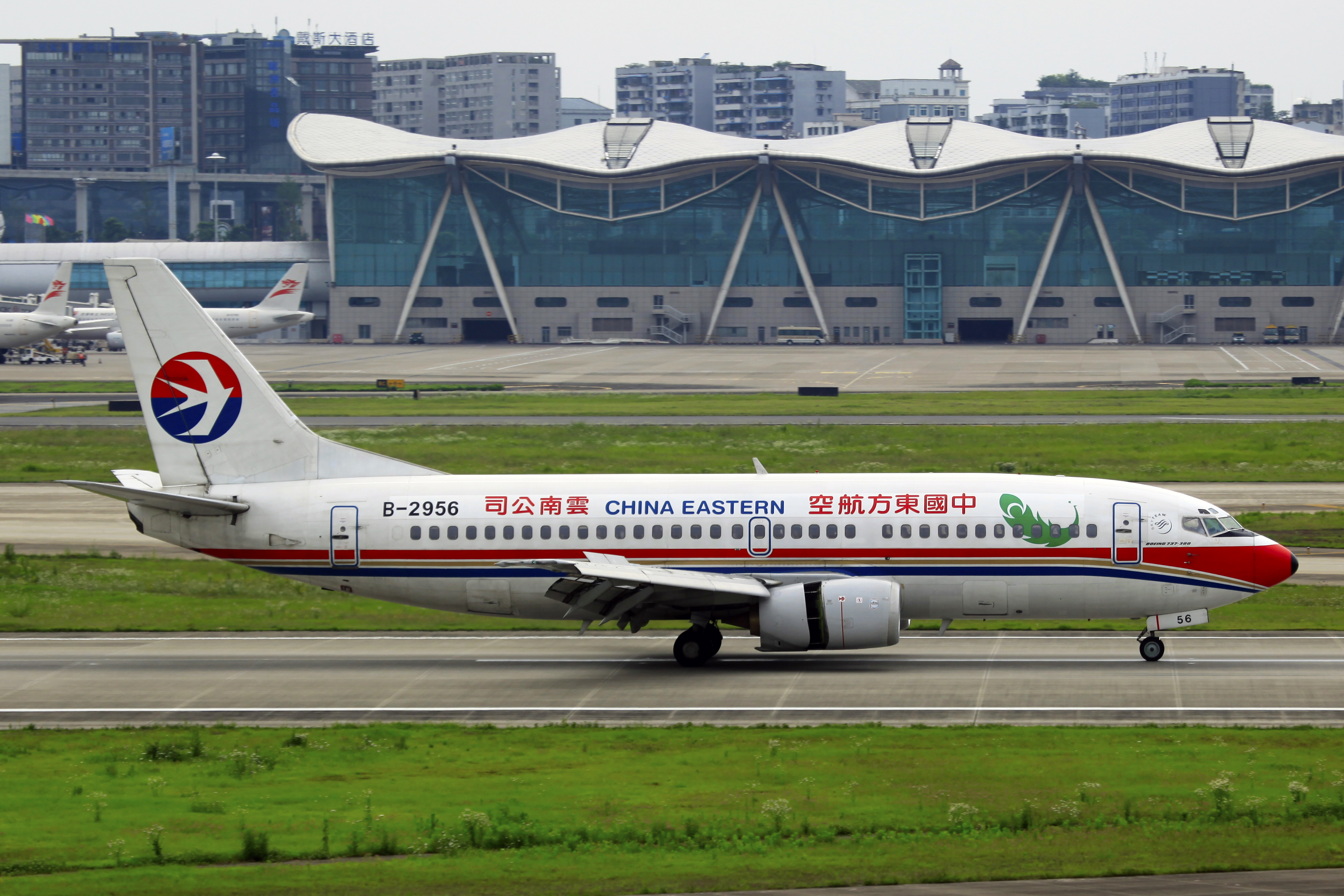
China Eastern Yunnan Airlines Boeing 737-300 in 2013

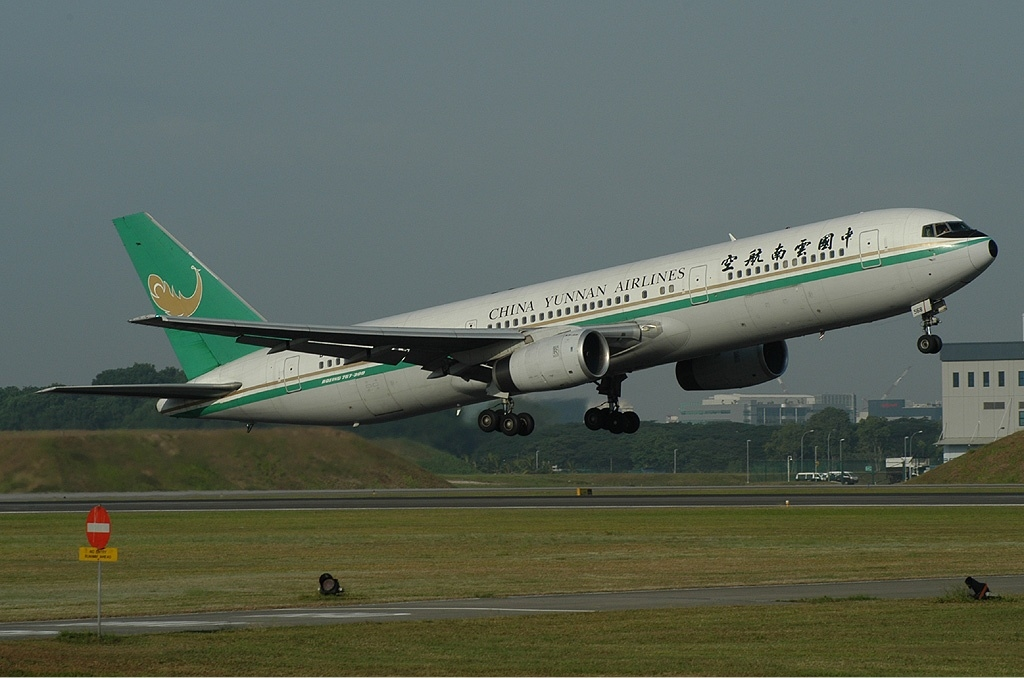
China Yunnan Airlines Boeing 767-300 in 2003

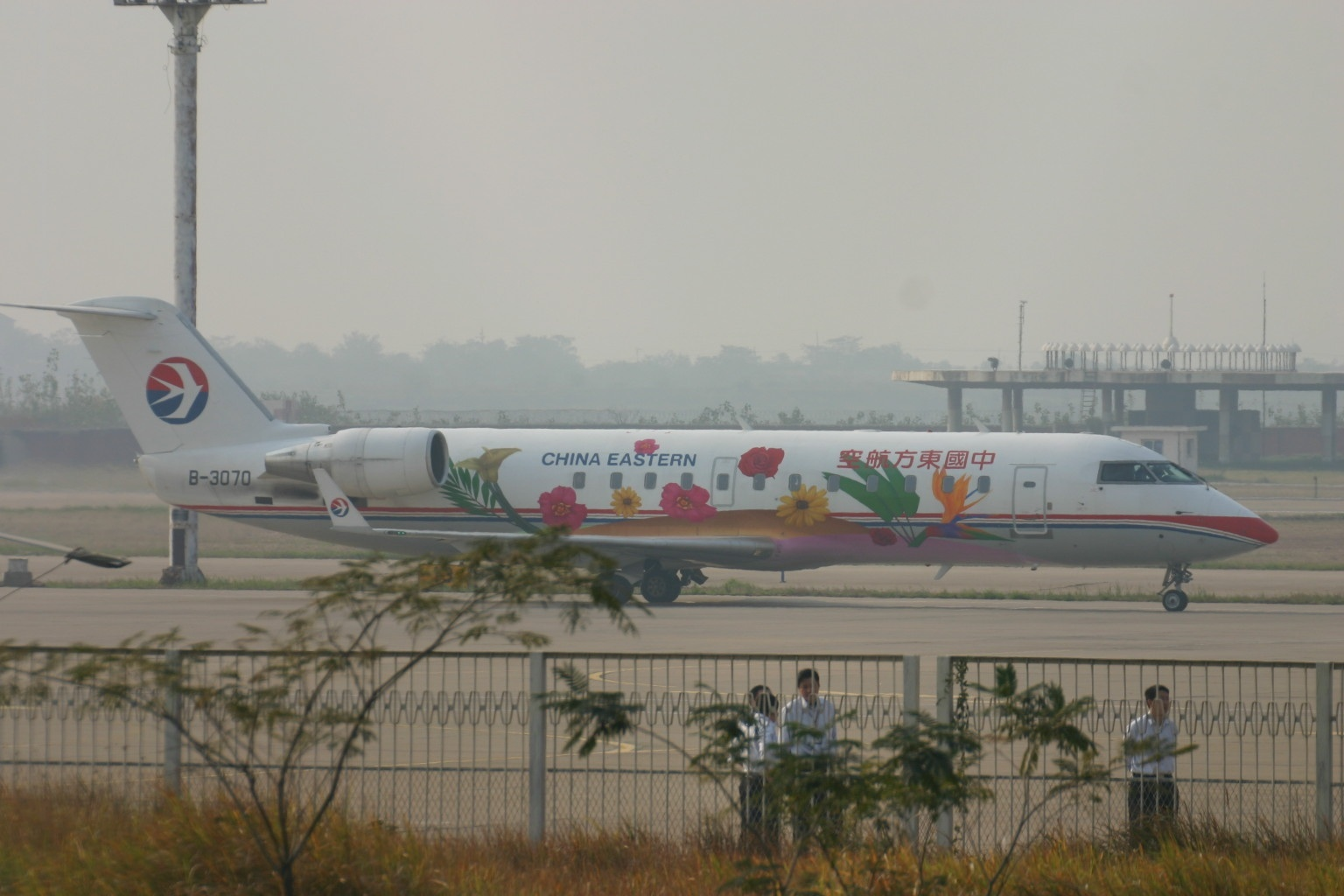
China Eastern Yunnan Airlines Bombardier CRJ-200ER in 2012

== Accidents and incidents ==
- On 21 November 2004, China Eastern Airlines Flight 5210, a Bombardier CRJ-200LR, crashed shortly after takeoff from Baotou Airport due to wing icing, killing all 53 on board and two people on the ground.
- On 21 March 2022, China Eastern Airlines Flight 5735, operated by a Boeing 737-89P (B-1791), crashed during cruise in a dive in Teng County, killing all 132 on board.
