= China Eastern Airlines Flight 5735 =

2022 plane crash in Guangxi, China

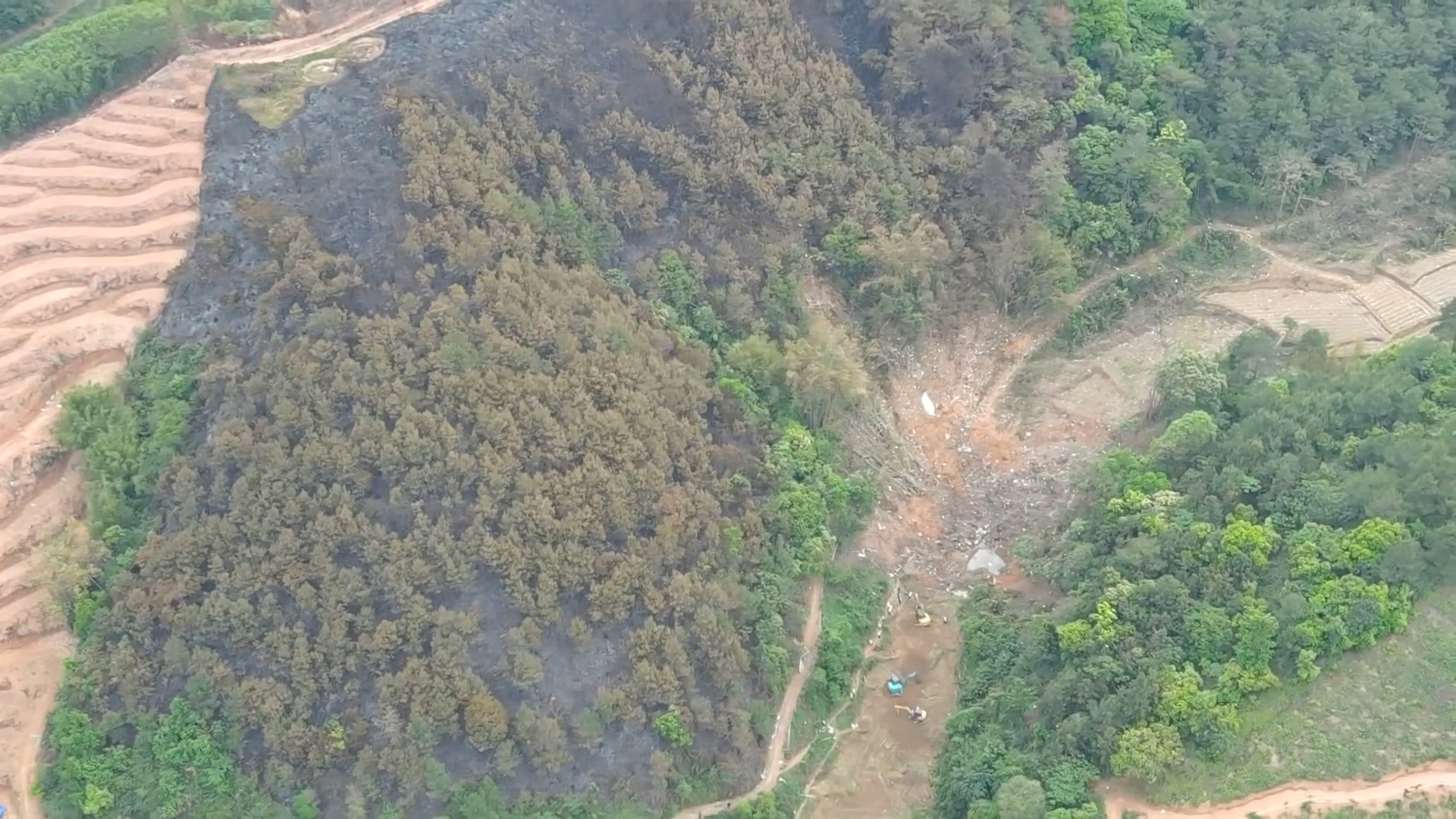
- The crash site

Accident
- Date: 21 March 2022
- Summary: Crashed into terrain; under investigation
- Site: Southern hillside forest of Molang Village, Teng County, Wuzhou, Guangxi, China; 23°19′25.5″N 111°06′44.3″E

Aircraft
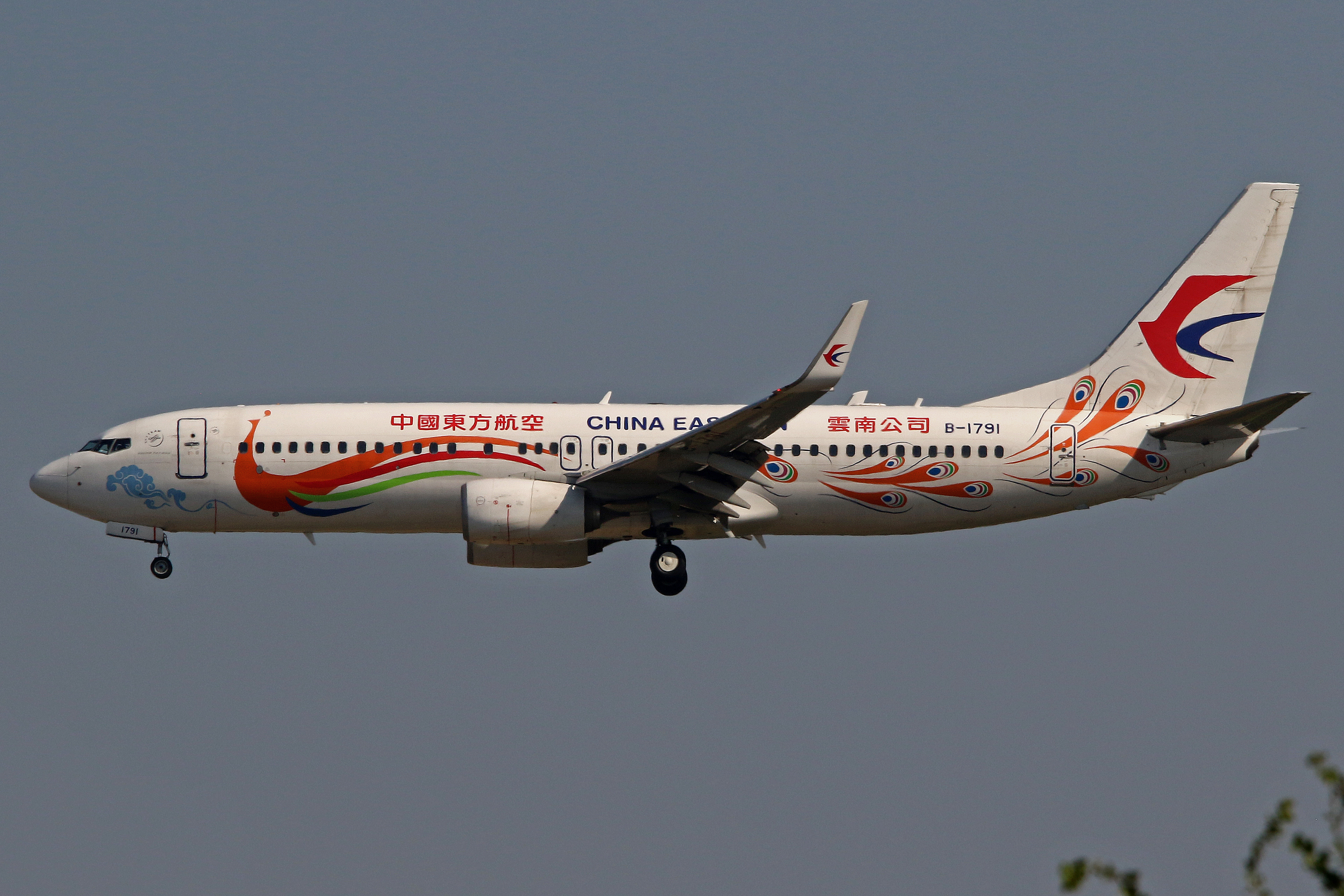
- B-1791, the aircraft involved, photographed in 2019
- Aircraft type: Boeing 737-89P
- Operator: China Eastern Yunnan Airlines
- IATA flight No.: MU5735
- ICAO flight No.: CES5735
- Call sign: CHINA EASTERN 5735
- Registration: B-1791
- Flight origin: Kunming Changshui International Airport, Kunming, Yunnan, China
- Destination: Guangzhou Baiyun International Airport, Guangzhou, Guangdong, China
- Occupants: 132
- Passengers: 123
- Crew: 9
- Fatalities: 132
- Survivors: 0

China Eastern Airlines Flight 5735 (MU5735) was a domestic passenger flight from Kunming Changshui International Airport to Guangzhou Baiyun International Airport in China. At 14:23 China Standard Time (06:23 UTC) on 21 March 2022, the Boeing 737-800 aircraft descended steeply mid-flight and struck the ground at high speed in Teng County, Wuzhou, Guangxi, killing all 132 passengers and crew on board. It was the third-deadliest aviation accident in China, (Note: After China Southern Airlines Flight 3943 in 1992 and China Northwest Airlines Flight 2303 in 1994.) the deadliest involving China Eastern Airlines, and the deadliest aviation accident of 2022. The Civil Aviation Administration of China (CAAC) is responsible for the investigation.

As of 2026, the CAAC has not released a final accident report and has not published annual updates into the investigation since 2024, which are required under the Convention on International Civil Aviation and the agency's own regulations. The CAAC has stated that no faults or abnormalities were found in the aircraft's systems, structures, or engines.

In May 2026, the National Transportation Safety Board (NTSB) of the United States released flight data recorder (FDR) information in response to a FOIA request from a Chinese citizen. The data showed that the fuel control switches for both engines were moved to the cutoff position, resulting in both engines shutting down. Seconds later, one of the control sticks in the cockpit was pushed down. While the sequence of events is more consistent with the aircraft being deliberately crashed, the document is not a final accident report.

== Background ==
=== Aircraft ===
The aircraft involved was a Boeing 737-89P (Note: The 8 in the suffix denotes that it was a -800 series variant of the 737; 9P is the Boeing customer code for China Eastern Airlines.) (737NG or 737 Next Generation) registered as B-1791 with serial number 41474. It was powered by two CFM56-7B26E turbofan engines built by CFM International. It first flew on 5 June 2015 and was delivered new to China Eastern Yunnan Airlines (subsidiary of China Eastern Airlines) on 25 June 2015.

The 737-800 has a solid safety record, with 11 previous fatal accidents (the first in September 2006) out of more than 7,000 planes delivered since 1997.

=== Passengers and crew ===
The Civil Aviation Administration of China (CAAC) and the airline reported 123 passengers and 9 crew members to be on the flight, for a total of 132 people. All were Chinese. The occupants included members of 74 families from 17 provinces of China.

The flight crew consisted of three pilots, five flight attendants and an in-flight security guard. The pilots were:

- 32-year-old Captain Yang Hongda (杨洪达) had been employed as a Boeing 737 pilot since January 2018, with a total of 6,709 flight hours.
- 59-year-old First Officer Zhang Zhengping (张正平) was amongst China's most experienced commercial pilots, with 31,769 flight hours, and was a flight instructor for China Eastern, having trained more than 100 captains. He had been awarded the honorary title of "Meritorious Pilot" of civil aviation in 2011.
- 27-year-old Second Officer (as observer) Ni Gongtao (倪公涛), with a total of 556 flight hours, was aboard to fulfill training duties.

== Flight ==
Flight path (data from Flightradar24) Interactive map (map data)

The aircraft departed Kunming Changshui International Airport for Guangzhou Baiyun International Airport at 13:15 (05:15 UTC) and was scheduled to land at 15:05 (07:05 UTC). The aircraft was scheduled to travel earlier from Baoshan to Kunming, but this segment of the journey was temporarily suspended due to low passenger numbers as a result of the COVID-19 pandemic in mainland China.

Contact with the aircraft was lost over the city of Wuzhou. At 14:22 (06:22 UTC), while approaching its top of descent into Guangzhou, the aircraft entered a sudden steep descent from 29,100 feet (8,900 m). It briefly leveled off and climbed from 7,400 ft (2,300 m) to 9,225 ft (2,812 m), but then plunged downwards again, reaching a final recorded altitude of 3,225 ft (983 m) at 376 kn (696 km/h) less than two minutes after the beginning of the descent, with a maximum descent rate of above 32,000 feet (9,800 m) per minute.

At 14:23 (06:23 UTC), the aircraft lost signal and crashed in the mountainous regions of Teng County causing a fire in nearby vegetation. According to an astronautics and aeronautics professor at Massachusetts Institute of Technology, preliminary data indicated the aircraft traveled close to the speed of sound when it crashed. Data from Flightradar24 suggest it was traveling at speeds of 640 km/h (400 mph) and may have exceeded 1,126 km/h (700 mph) at the time of impact. The aircraft's impact into the ground created a crater 100 ft (30 m) wide and 66 ft (20 m) deep, where most of the wreckage was discovered.

The footage of the aircraft plummeting to the ground

Residents of the villages surrounding the crash site heard a loud explosion. The final descent and crash was recorded by a security camera at the premises of a local mining company. The video showed the plane in a near vertical dive seconds before it struck the ground. Footage from the crash site showed wreckage and a fire. Many smaller pieces of wreckage were scattered in the surrounding area. All of the plane's occupants died. It was the first fatal crash involving China Eastern Yunnan Airlines since November 2004's Flight 5210.

Some information channels such as at Kunming Changshui International Airport and Umetrip temporarily showed the flight had arrived due to not registering the flight's loss of contact. Others showed "loss of contact", "unknown", or a blanked-out status.

== Emergency response and recovery ==
Local authorities dispatched 450 firefighters to the scene of the accident. Firefighters were dispatched by the Wuzhou Fire and Rescue Department at 15:05. At 15:56, firefighters from nearby Tangbu arrived, and at 16:40, firefighters from outside Wuzhou were dispatched from Guilin, Beihai, Hezhou, Laibin and Hechi.

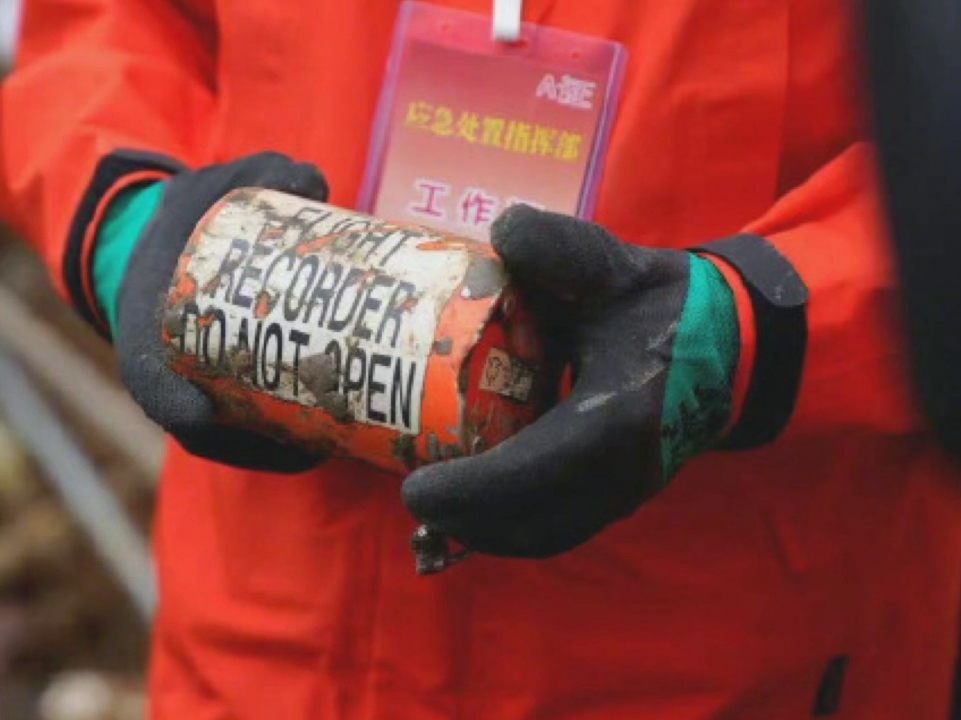
The recovered cockpit voice recorder, 23 March 2022

Rescue crews initially had difficulty accessing the site because of the forest fire which was extinguished by 17:25. By evening, 117 out of 650 dispatched rescuers were nearby and headed to the site from three directions. Aircraft wreckage and victims' belongings were found, but no signs of human remains were detected. Workers used hand equipment, detection dogs and UAVs to search for the flight recorders and human remains, finding one flight recorder on 23 March. The crash site was concentrated within a 30-metre (100 ft) radius where most of the wreck was found. Major components such as the horizontal stabilizers, vertical tails, rudders, left and right engines, left and right wings, fuselage parts, landing gear and cockpit were recovered from the area. Rescue workers found a 1.3-metre-long (4 ft 3 in) fragment of a wing trailing edge about 12 kilometres (7 mi) from the main site.

Wet weather and the challenging accessibility of the crash site hampered the recovery process. Heavy rain partially filled the impact crater with water which had to be pumped away. Recovery activities were suspended on the morning of 23 March because of the threat of landslides. The remains of all 132 aircraft occupants were positively identified by 29 March. As of 31 March 2022, at least 49,117 pieces of airplane wreckage had been recovered.

== Investigation ==
=== Initial investigation ===
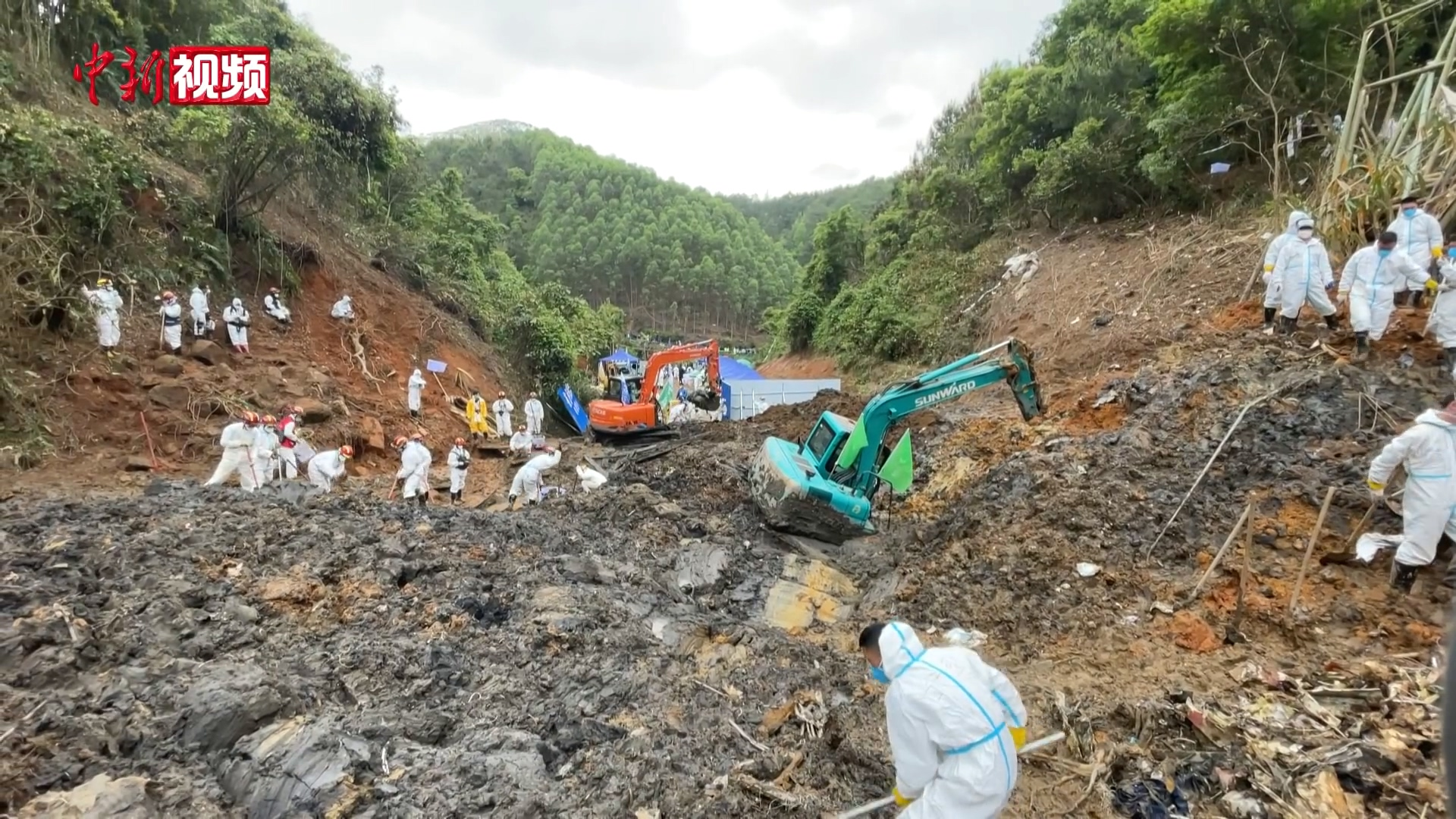
Search and rescue teams working on the scene, 25 March 2022

The CAAC activated an emergency task force and dispatched a team to the crash site. Liu Ning, secretary of the Chinese Communist Party in Guangxi, accompanied by other officials, visited the crash site and ordered an "all-out" search and rescue operation of the provincial government.

American agencies responded as representatives of the country where the aircraft was manufactured. The Federal Aviation Administration (FAA) said it was ready to assist in investigation efforts if requested. Boeing said that it was informed by initial reports and was gathering details. The National Transportation Safety Board (NTSB) said a senior official had been appointed as its representative to the inquiry. Representatives from the engine manufacturer CFM International, Boeing, and the FAA were assigned as technical advisers in the probe. United States Transportation secretary Pete Buttigieg said on 23 March 2022 that Chinese authorities had invited the NTSB to take part in the investigation. COVID-19 quarantine regulations may have hampered access of United States investigators to mainland China. On 29 March 2022, the NTSB announced that China had granted visas to the agency and the technical advisors from Boeing, CFM, and the FAA.

The cockpit voice recorder (CVR) was found on 23 March 2022, severely damaged externally, but the internal storage unit appeared to be relatively intact. It was sent to Beijing for data extraction. The emergency locator transmitter (ELT) was retrieved on 26 March, and on 27 March, the flight data recorder (FDR) was recovered. It had been buried 1.5 metres (5 ft) deep in the soil and appeared slightly dented but was intact. The two flight recorders were sent to a facility in Washington, D.C. for analysis. Concurrently, on 1 April 2022, a team of NTSB investigators left the United States for China.

Mao Yanfeng, head of aircraft investigation at the CAAC, stated the flight had not encountered dangerous weather conditions. No components of common explosives were detected. Chinese leadership called for open, timely and transparent publication of information about the crash. The CAAC published a preliminary report on 20 April 2022, 30 days after the accident. Soon after the accident, it was suggested that catastrophic failure of the tailplane (for example, a stabilizer problem) and sabotage (such as a pilot intentionally crashing) were two of the possibilities regarding the cause of the crash. On 24 March 2022, a piece of the jet was discovered about 10 km (6 mi) from the crash site, initially giving weight to the theory of a mid-air breakup. However, the Chinese authorities later confirmed that it was a winglet, whose loss should not severely impair airworthiness, and which is lightweight enough that it might have been blown some distance by the wind after breaking off during the descent.

=== CAAC investigation reports ===
On 20 April 2022 (30 days after the accident), the CAAC released a preliminary report regarding the accident, stating that "there was no abnormality in the radio communication and control command between the crew and the air traffic control department before deviating from the cruise altitude." It was reported that the plane was airworthy, up to date on inspections, that all personnel met requirements, that weather was fine, and that no dangerous goods were found. Both aircraft recorders were severely damaged and were sent to Washington for further investigation.

On 20 March 2023 (the first anniversary of the accident), the CAAC released an unusually short interim statement that the investigation is ongoing due to the "very complicated and very rare" nature of the accident.

On 20 March 2024 (the second anniversary of the accident), the CAAC published an interim update, according to which "no anomalies" had been found, all activities and procedures adhered to the prescribed protocols, ground crew including the air traffic control personnel were found competent, and navigation equipment were working as expected. Officials further stated they would update the report as more information becomes available. The report was published one day before the second anniversary of the crash.

On 21 March 2025 (the third anniversary of the accident), the CAAC did not release an annual investigation progress report or a final investigation report, as required by Annex 13 of the Chicago Convention on International Civil Aviation and CAAC's own regulations. According to a document circulated on Chinese social media, on 19 May 2025, in response to an open government information request, the CAAC reportedly said that it had decided not to release an annual interim investigation report to the public because releasing the report might "endanger national security and societal stability". (Note: On 1 May 2026, Deutsche Welle wrote that it had not yet been able to confirm the authenticity of the document.)

It was noted in March 2026 that CAAC had failed to release a progress report for the second consecutive year.

=== National Transportation Safety Board report ===
NTSB response to FOIA request

On 29 April 2026, the NTSB responded to a Freedom of Information Act request submitted in January 2026 by a Chinese citizen, releasing materials that included FDR contents, email correspondence between the NTSB and the CAAC, and a July 2022 data download report. The materials were subsequently circulated online, including on GitHub and Wikipedia, before being published on the NTSB's website on 1 May. It was then speculated that the Chinese citizen published the NTSB's documents across numerous social media platforms; subsequently, numerous posts on the Chinese social media applications Zhihu, Weibo and Xiaohongshu were deleted.

According to FDR data, about 23 seconds before the recording stopped, one of the pilots pressed levers that cut off fuel flow to the engines, causing both to shut down. The autopilot disengaged immediately afterward. About three seconds later, one of the yokes was forcefully pushed forward, sending the aircraft into a dive, while the control wheel was turned, causing at least one full 360-degree roll. The data does not identify which pilot made the inputs. Back-and-forth movement of the control wheels suggests a possible struggle in the cockpit, with at least two people applying opposing inputs, either on the same control wheel or separately by the captain and first officer pushing in different directions on their own wheels. However evidence of a struggle was not conclusive.

At an altitude of 26,000 feet (7,900 m), about 23 seconds after the fuel control switches were moved to cutoff, the FDR stopped recording due to a loss of electrical power and did not capture the remainder of the flight. The CVR, which has a backup power source, continued recording. Although the CVR was damaged, NTSB investigators recovered four audio segments and provided them, along with the FDR data, to the CAAC. The NTSB said it did not retain copies of the recordings.

Jeff Guzzetti, a former accident investigator for the NTSB, and aviation consultants Tony Stanton and John Cox all agreed that the data was consistent with the fuel supply being manually cut off by one or both of the pilots. However Stanton cautioned that the released materials should not be treated as a final accident report.

=== In the media ===
Early reports of the aircraft's flight data recorder pointed towards a deliberate crash from the cockpit. Flight controls were pushed to put the plane into a dive. This led the investigation toward the pilot or the possibility of a cockpit breach. China Eastern Airlines noted the unlikeliness of anyone breaching the cockpit, as an emergency code was not broadcast. The Chinese authorities are not pointing to issues regarding mechanical or flight control problems.

On 17 May 2022, The Wall Street Journal reported a source from the United States government, from officials involved in the investigation, as saying that the plane had been intentionally crashed, based on an analysis of data from the aircraft recorders. News reports published by ABC News on the same day concurred with the Wall Street Journal's report of the investigating officials in the United States government declaring that the aircraft had been deliberately put into a vertical dive by a person on the flight deck, also citing flight recorder data showing that the landing gear and flaps had evidently not been engaged or deployed during the aircraft's descent which would indicate the pilots attempting an emergency descent or landing.

Multiple reports also mentioned that in the moments just before and during the descent, there were no distress or mayday calls from the cockpit to air traffic control nor any answers to the attempts from air traffic control and nearby aircraft to make contact with the aircraft. A video was released to the public on the day of the accident, showing the aircraft entering a steep dive before slamming into a hilly area.

On 11 April 2022, the CAAC said that media speculation about the cause of the crash has "gravely misled the public" and interfered with the investigation.

== Reactions ==
=== Domestic ===
Chinese Premier Li Keqiang called for comprehensive efforts to search for survivors and treat the injured, emphasizing the need to reassure and serve the families of the victims. General secretary of the Chinese Communist Party Xi Jinping called for investigators to determine the cause as soon as possible and to ensure "absolute" aviation safety. Over 1,000 psychology staff were dispatched to provide aid and emotional support to the families of the victims.

China Eastern established a hotline for family members and announced that its Boeing 737-800 fleet would be grounded for inspection until the investigation was completed. Most of the airline's 737-800s eventually returned to service in April 2022.

VariFlight reported that nearly 74 percent of the 11,800 flights scheduled in China on 22 March were canceled as a result of the crash. A majority of flight services between Beijing and Shanghai were canceled. Cancellation rates in China were the highest of 2022. Nearly 89 percent of all China Eastern flights were canceled on 22 March.

News concerning the crash was heavily censored in China. State-run media focused on the emergency crews' response, including detailed lists of their equipment and provisions, and orders from CCP General Secretary Xi Jinping that officials do everything possible to find survivors. After officials initially failed to answer basic questions about the plane and its pilots, they were accused by online commentators of "rainbow farts," an idiom for excessive praise. Articles and social media posts that asked more detailed questions were deleted by censors. Faced with mounting pressure, officials eventually provided information on the maintenance history of the plane, the pilots' flight experience, and weather conditions at the time of the crash.

Within two hours of the crash, twenty people claimed to have "survived" by not boarding the flight. Local media found only two of these claims to be genuine.

There are reports of speculation in China that one of the pilots, 59-year-old first officer Zhang Zhengping, had been demoted from captain prior to the crash.

=== International ===
A number of world leaders expressed condolences for the loss of life incurred.

In India, the Directorate General of Civil Aviation (DGCA) placed all Boeing 737 aircraft flown by Indian carriers under "enhanced surveillance." SpiceJet, Vistara and Air India Express have the aircraft in their fleets. An official from the regulatory body said that "safety is serious business" and that the situation was being closely monitored.

On United States stock markets, Boeing shares initially fell by 7.8 percent and China Eastern shares by 8.2 percent after the incident. On the Hong Kong Stock Exchange, China Eastern shares dropped by 6.5 percent.

Boeing offered its condolences to the families of the victims and said that it was in contact with China Eastern and the NTSB.

== See also ==
- List of accidents and incidents involving the Boeing 737
