= Dali, Teng County =

Dali 大黎镇
- Town
- Location in Guangxi
- Coordinates: 23°53′40″N 110°32′54″E
- Country: People's Republic of China
- Province: Guangxi
- Prefecture-level city: Wuzhou
- County: Teng County
- Time zone: UTC+8 (China Standard)

Dali (Chinese: 大黎; pinyin: Dàlí) is a town under the administration of Teng County, Guangxi, China. As of 2020, it administers Dali Residential Community and the following 18 villages:

- Dali Village
- Litian Village (黎田村)
- Chaolin Village (朝林村)
- Ping'an Village (平安村)
- Guo'an Village (国安村)
- Dong'an Village (东安村)
- Xing'an Village (兴安村)
- Gupan Village (古盘村)
- Xiangjiang Village (祥江村)
- Yonghe Village (永和村)
- Laili Village (来历村)
- He'an Village (和安村)
- Shangrong Village (上荣村)
- Huazhou Village (花洲村)
- Lida Village (理答村)
- Baizhu Village (白祝村)
- Taixing Village (太兴村)
- Fudou Village (富斗村)
