= China Eastern Airlines Flight 5210 =

2004 aviation accident

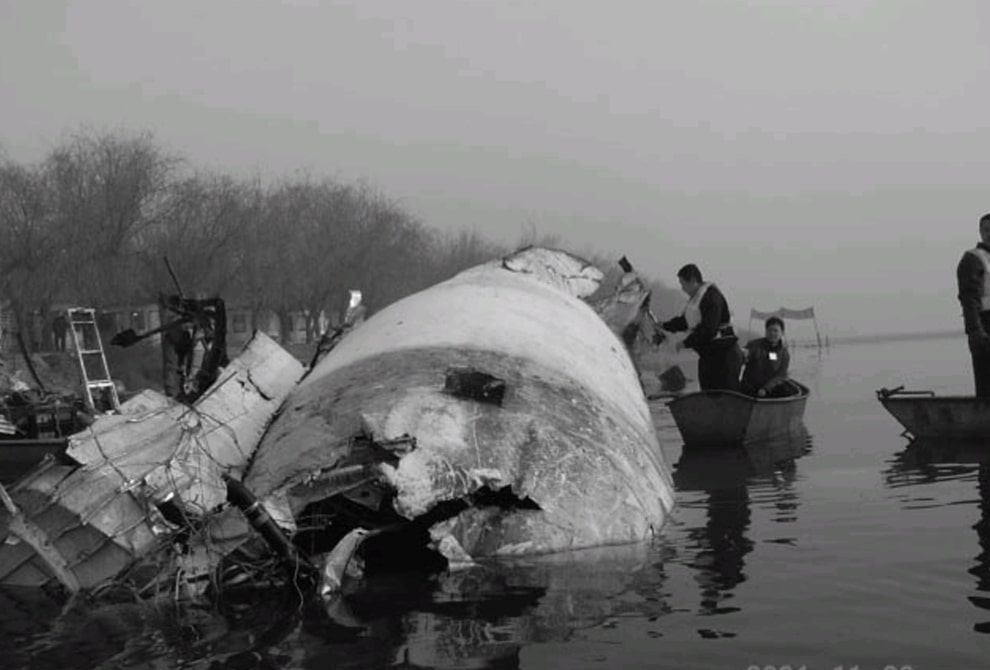
- Wreckage of the aircraft

Accident
- Date: 21 November 2004
- Summary: Atmospheric icing leading to loss of control
- Site: Baotou Erliban Airport, Baotou, Inner Mongolia, China; 40°32′57.36″N 110°00′53.94″E
- Total fatalities: 55

Aircraft
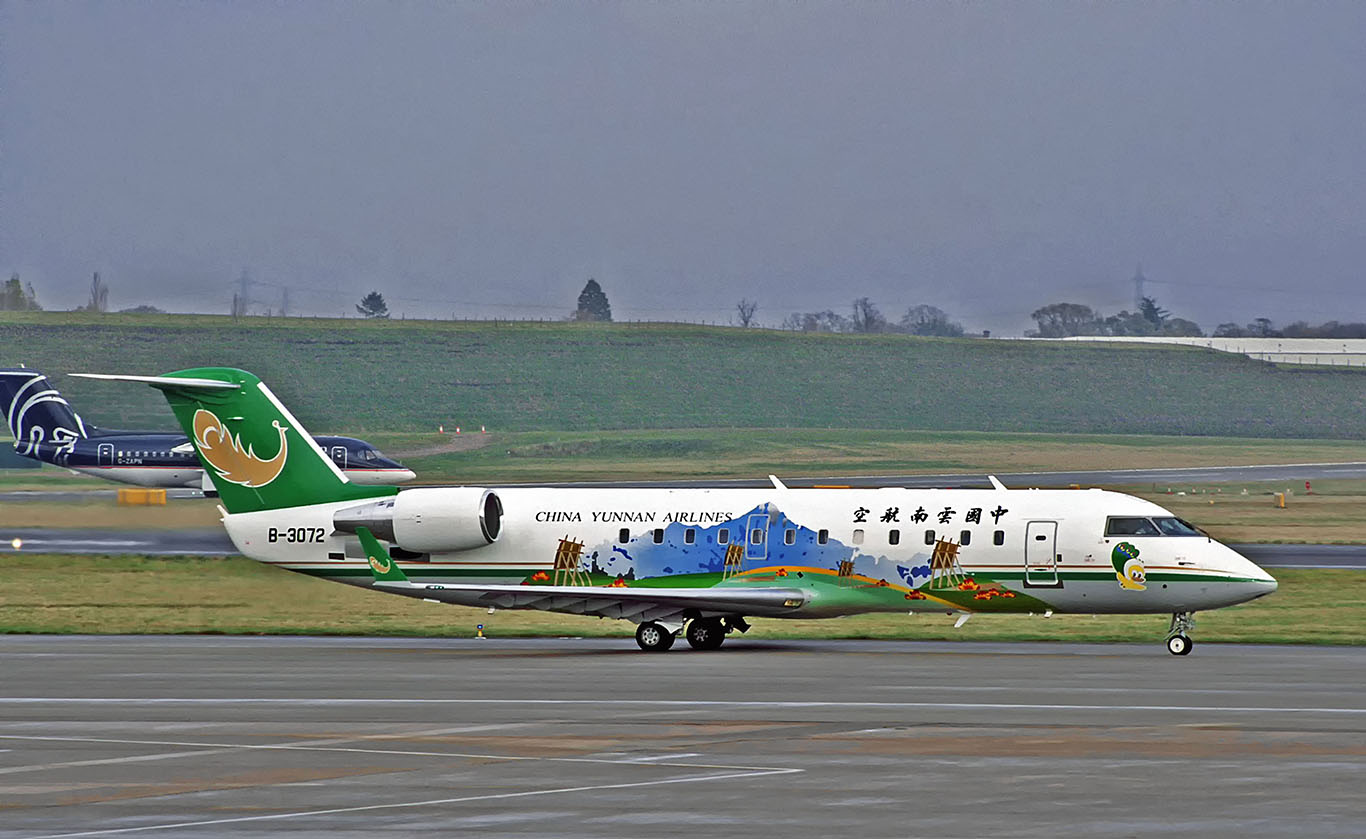
- B-3072, the aircraft involved in the accident, in 2002
- Aircraft type: Bombardier CRJ200ER
- Operator: China Eastern Yunnan Airlines
- IATA flight No.: MU5210
- ICAO flight No.: CES5210
- Call sign: CHINA EASTERN 5210
- Registration: B-3072
- Flight origin: Baotou Erliban Airport
- Stopover: Beijing Capital International Airport
- Destination: Shanghai Hongqiao International Airport
- Occupants: 53
- Passengers: 47
- Crew: 6
- Fatalities: 53
- Survivors: 0

Ground casualties
- Ground fatalities: 2

China Eastern Airlines Flight 5210 (CES5210/MU5210), also known as the Baotou Air Disaster, was a scheduled flight from Baotou in Inner Mongolia, China, to Shanghai, with a planned stopover at Beijing. On 21 November 2004, just two minutes after takeoff from Baotou, the Bombardier CRJ200ER fell from the sky and crashed into a lake in Nanhai Park, next to the airport, killing all 53 people on board and two more on the ground.

An investigation by the Civil Aviation Administration of China (CAAC) revealed that the plane had not been deiced by the ground crew while it was parked on the tarmac. Ice accumulation on the wings caused the plane to lose its lift, causing the crash. It is the deadliest accident involving a CRJ100/200 series, and was the deadliest in China Eastern Airlines' history at that time until the crash of Flight 5735 on 21 March 2022, which killed 132 crew and passengers.

== Accident ==
Flight 5210 was operated by a Bombardier CRJ200ER powered by two General Electric CF34-3B1 engines, and was delivered in November 2002, two years prior to the crash. The plane took off at 08:21 local time, 15 minutes ahead of schedule, carrying 47 passengers and six crew members. Ten seconds after taking off, the airplane shook for several seconds and then fell to the ground. The plane skidded through a park and crashed into a house, a park ticketing station, and a port, setting fire to several moored yachts. It then plunged into an icy lake. All 53 people on board and two park employees on the ground were killed in the crash.

=== Search and rescue ===
Chinese leaders Hu Jintao, Wen Jiabao and Huang Ju, ordered an immediate rescue operation. More than 100 firefighters were dispatched to the crash site. Also sent to the disaster site were 250 police officers, 50 park staff, and 20 divers. Rescuers had to break through the ice to retrieve bodies. By the end of the day, crews had recovered 36 bodies from the frozen lake. According to a doctor who worked in a nearby hospital, rescuers had only recovered bodily organs and intestines of victims.

Rescue efforts were hampered by the low temperatures. By the day after the crash, most of the plane had been recovered from the lake. A team of rescue experts from the Ministry of Communications' Maritime Bureau also arrived at the crash site on 22 November. On 24 November, investigators located the cockpit voice recorder (CVR) and the flight data recorder (FDR) by the radio pings that the devices emitted.

== Passengers and crew ==
On 23 November, the flight's passenger manifest was released by China Eastern officials. Of the 47 passengers on board, 46 were Chinese. Officials confirmed that only one foreigner was on board, from Indonesia. The flight crew members were identified as Captain Wang Pin (Chinese: 王品) (33), Vice Captain Yang Guang (Chinese: 杨光) (37), and First Officer Yi Qinwei (Chinese: 易沁炜) (27), plus two flight attendants and a security officer.

== Investigation ==
Many witnesses stated that the plane shook for several seconds, and then exploded in midair. According to one witness, a blast occurred at the tail of the plane. Smoke began to pour from the plane before it crashed into the park, becoming a fireball, and then skidded across the park and into the lake. Others claimed that the plane exploded into "flaming fragments" in the air before it crashed.

The crash occurred just three months after the bombing of a Tupolev Tu-154 and a Tupolev Tu-134 in Russia, which killed 90 people. At the time, investigators of the Russian bombings found traces of explosives aboard the two planes. Investigators at the crash of Flight 5120, however, stated that they did not find any evidence of terrorism, according to state-run news agency Xinhua.

The crash was also just one month after Pinnacle Airlines Flight 3701, which also involved a CRJ200, prompting the Civil Aviation Administration of China to ground all CRJ200's for one month, until no technical faults with the aircraft were determined.

== Aftermath ==
In 2006, twelve China Eastern Airlines employees were found to be responsible for the accident and received administrative punishment.
