= Teng County =

Teng County 藤县
- County
- Location of the seat in Guangxi
- Coordinates: 23°22′32″N 110°54′52″E
- Country: China
- Region: Guangxi
- Prefecture-level city: Wuzhou
- County seat: Tengzhou (藤州镇)

Area
  - Total: 3,945.62 km^{2} (1,523.41 sq mi)

Population (2021)
  - Total: 1,125,264
  - Density: 285.193/km^{2} (738.647/sq mi)
- Time zone: UTC+8 (China Standard)
- Postal code: 543300
- Area code: 0774

Teng County or Tengxian (Chinese: 藤县; pinyin: Téng Xiàn; Zhuang: Dwngz Yen) is a county of eastern Guangxi, China. It is under the administration of the prefecture-level city of Wuzhou. As of 2021, it had a population of 1,125,264 residing in an area of 3,945.62 km^{2} (1,523.41 sq mi). The county is divided into northern and southern parts by the Xun River.

== History ==
Teng County was part of Baiyue areas until coming under Qin dynasty rule in 214 BC. In 583 AD, the county was called Yongping Commandery with its administrative seat established at Tengzhou. In 621, Yongping was renamed to Teng County.

On 21 March 2022, China Eastern Airlines Flight 5735 crashed in the county, killing all 132 people on board.

== Administrative divisions ==
Teng County administers 15 towns and 2 townships.

Towns

- Tengzhou (藤州镇)
- Tangbu (塘步镇)
- Langnan (琅南镇)
- Tongxin (同心镇)
- Jinji (金鸡镇)
- Xinqing (新庆镇)
- Xiangqi (象棋镇)
- Lingjing (岭景镇)
- Tianping (天平镇)
- Mengjiang (Mongkong) (蒙江镇 (濛江))
- Heping (和平镇)
- Taiping (太平镇)
- Gulong (古龙镇)
- Dongrong (东荣镇)
- Dali (大黎镇)

Townships

- Pingfu Township (平福乡)
- Ningkang Township (宁康乡)

== Economy ==
Teng County is one of the largest titanium dioxide production bases in China, accounting for around 5% of the national output in 2013. It also has kaolinite resources, which are used for local ceramics production.

== Demographics ==
The total population in 2021 was 1,125,264. Ethnic minorities form 1.19% of the population, most of whom are Zhuang and Yao.

== Notable people ==
- Chen Yucheng
- Li Xiucheng

== Climate ==
Climate data for Tengxian, elevation 106 m (348 ft), (1991–2020 normals, extremes 1981–present)
Month	Jan	Feb	Mar	Apr	May	Jun	Jul	Aug	Sep	Oct	Nov	Dec	Year
Record high °C (°F)	29.7 (85.5)	34.7 (94.5)	33.7 (92.7)	35.8 (96.4)	37.9 (100.2)	37.8 (100.0)	39.4 (102.9)	38.7 (101.7)	38.1 (100.6)	35.8 (96.4)	33.6 (92.5)	30.3 (86.5)	39.4 (102.9)
Mean daily maximum °C (°F)	16.9 (62.4)	18.9 (66.0)	21.4 (70.5)	26.7 (80.1)	30.5 (86.9)	32.4 (90.3)	33.7 (92.7)	33.6 (92.5)	32.1 (89.8)	29.0 (84.2)	24.5 (76.1)	19.3 (66.7)	26.6 (79.9)
Daily mean °C (°F)	12.3 (54.1)	14.3 (57.7)	17.3 (63.1)	22.2 (72.0)	25.6 (78.1)	27.5 (81.5)	28.4 (83.1)	28.2 (82.8)	26.8 (80.2)	23.5 (74.3)	18.7 (65.7)	13.8 (56.8)	21.6 (70.8)
Mean daily minimum °C (°F)	9.2 (48.6)	11.2 (52.2)	14.5 (58.1)	19.1 (66.4)	22.5 (72.5)	24.6 (76.3)	25.1 (77.2)	24.9 (76.8)	23.3 (73.9)	19.5 (67.1)	14.8 (58.6)	10.2 (50.4)	18.2 (64.8)
Record low °C (°F)	−1.2 (29.8)	−0.3 (31.5)	1.2 (34.2)	6.8 (44.2)	13.0 (55.4)	17.5 (63.5)	19.1 (66.4)	20.2 (68.4)	15.1 (59.2)	6.6 (43.9)	2.7 (36.9)	−2.9 (26.8)	−2.9 (26.8)
Average precipitation mm (inches)	60.4 (2.38)	52.3 (2.06)	103.6 (4.08)	148.3 (5.84)	239.7 (9.44)	229.5 (9.04)	194.4 (7.65)	187.3 (7.37)	98.9 (3.89)	50.5 (1.99)	56.4 (2.22)	42.7 (1.68)	1,464 (57.64)
Average precipitation days (≥ 0.1 mm)	10.0	10.5	15.4	15.8	18.5	19.5	16.3	15.9	10.7	5.4	7.3	7.5	152.8
Average snowy days	0.1	0	0	0	0	0	0	0	0	0	0	0	0.1
Average relative humidity (%)	77	79	83	82	83	84	81	82	79	75	75	74	80
Mean monthly sunshine hours	86.1	71.5	58.8	88.1	134.9	150.0	201.5	198.7	182.3	185.9	149.7	127.7	1,635.2
Percentage possible sunshine	26	22	16	23	33	37	49	50	50	52	46	39	37
Source: China Meteorological AdministrationAll-time May high
