= List of runway collisions =

This is list of notable instances of aircraft incidents and accidents involving runway collisions.

== 1970s ==
- 1972 Chicago–O'Hare runway collision, a 1972 airport collision between a McDonnell Douglas DC-9 and a Convair 880
- Tenerife airport disaster in 1977, the deadliest air disaster in history, involving a runway collision between two Boeing 747s

== 1980s ==
- 1983 Anchorage runway collision, a 1983 airport collision between a DC-10 and a Piper Navajo
- 1983 Madrid Airport runway collision, a 1983 airport collision between a Boeing 727 and a McDonnell Douglas DC-9

== 1990s ==
- 1990 Guangzhou Baiyun airport collisions, A plane hijacking leading to three planes getting destroyed: a Boeing 737, a Boeing 757, and a Boeing 707
- 1990 Wayne County Airport runway collision, a 1990 airport collision between a Boeing 727 and a McDonnell Douglas DC-9
- 1991 Los Angeles runway collision, a 1991 airport collision between a Boeing 737 and a Fairchild Swearingen Metroliner
- 1994 St. Louis Airport collision, a 1994 airport collision between a MD-82 and a Cessna 441
- United Express Flight 5925, a 1996 airport collision between a Beechcraft 1900C and a King Air

== 2000s ==
- 2001 Linate Airport runway collision, a 2001 airport collision between a McDonnell Douglas MD-87 and a Cessna CitationJet
- 2005 Logan Airport near runway incursion, a 2005 near miss between a Airbus A330 and a Boeing 737
- 2007 San Francisco International Airport runway incursion, a near miss between a Embraer 170 and a Embraer 120

== 2020s ==
- 2024 Haneda Airport runway collision, a 2024 airport collision between a Airbus A350 and a De Havilland Canada Dash 8

== See also ==
- Runway excursion
- Runway incursion
- Ground collision
