= 1991 Los Angeles runway collision =

1991 runway collision in California

1991 Los Angeles runway collision USAir Flight 1493 · SkyWest Airlines Flight 5569
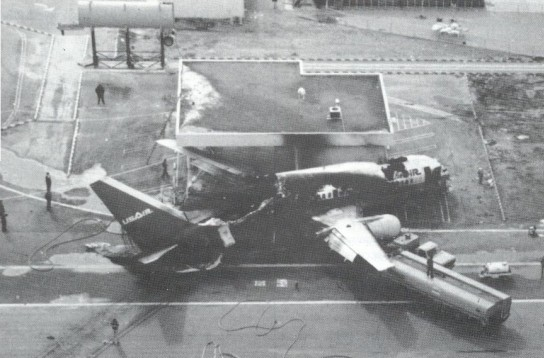
- Aerial view of the crash site

Accident
- Date: February 1, 1991
- Summary: Runway incursion caused by ATC error
- Site: Los Angeles International Airport, Los Angeles, California, United States; 33°56′58″N 118°24′34″W
- Total fatalities: 35 (Note: Although the NTSB's final report only lists 22 "fatal" injuries aboard USAir 1493, a total of 23 people died as a result of the crash. One fatality, a passenger who initially survived the crash but died 31 days later due to burn injuries, was officially recorded by the NTSB as a "serious" injury. In its final report, the NTSB explained that at the time, 49 CFR 830.2 defined "fatal injury" as an injury that results in death within 3 days of an accident. In accordance with regulation, the NTSB counted this deceased passenger among the 12 "serious" injuries. The regulation has since been revised, and as of October 2016, any injury resulting in death within 30 days is now deemed a "fatal injury".)
- Total injuries: 29
- Total survivors: 66

First aircraft
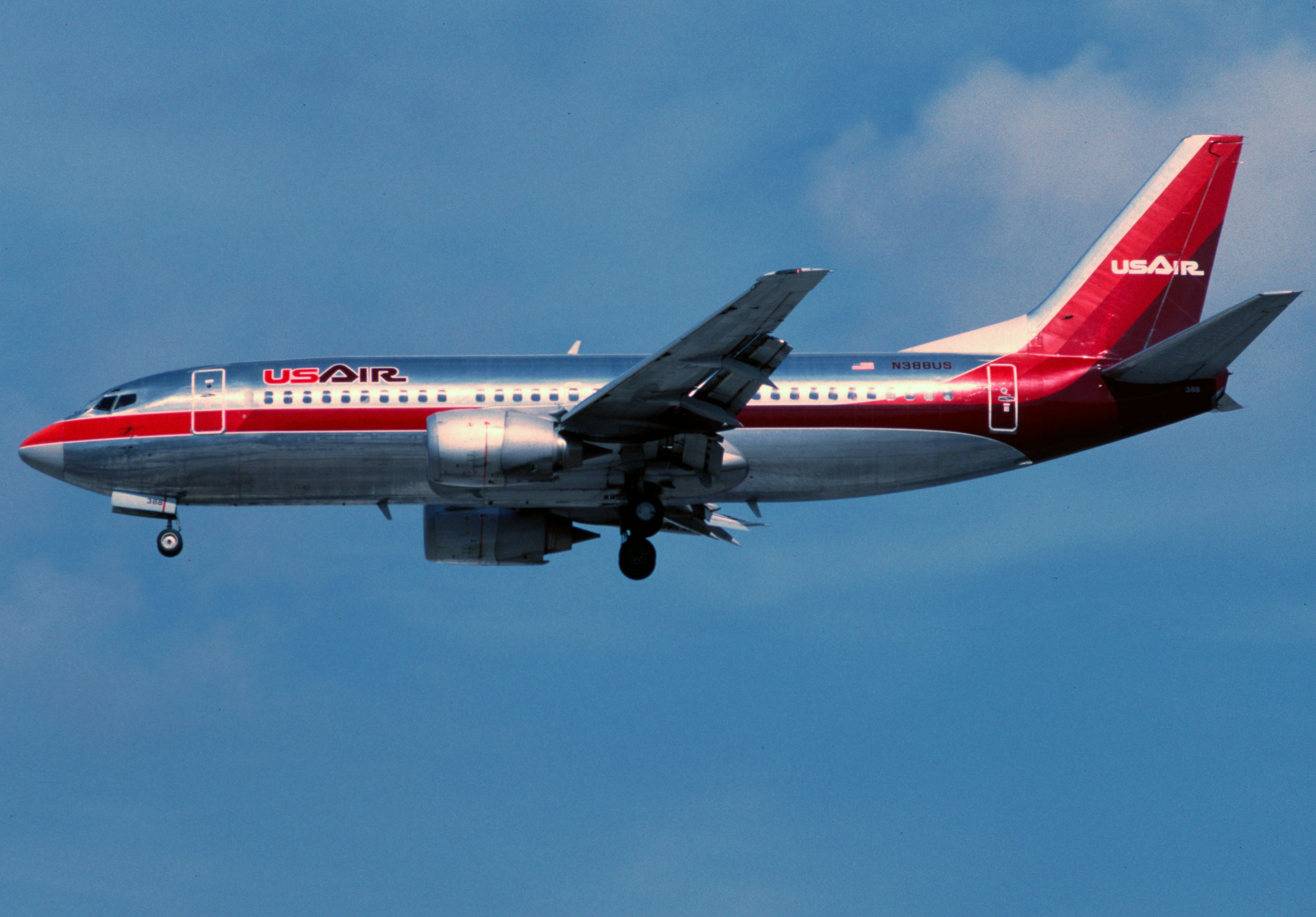
- N388US, the Boeing 737-3B7 involved in the collision, seen in 1990
- Type: Boeing 737-3B7 (Note: The 3 in the suffix denotes that it was a -300 series variant of the 737; B7 is the Boeing customer code for USAir.)
- Operator: USAir
- IATA flight No.: US1493
- ICAO flight No.: USA1493
- Call sign: US AIR 1493
- Registration: N388US
- Flight origin: Syracuse Hancock International Airport
- 1st stopover: Washington National Airport
- 2nd stopover: Port Columbus International Airport
- 3rd stopover: Los Angeles International Airport
- Destination: San Francisco International Airport
- Occupants: 89
- Passengers: 83 (Note: The executive summary of the NTSB report describes "89 passengers, 4 flight attendants, and 2 flight crewmembers" aboard Flight 1493. However, this does not match the contents of the report. The body of the report describes a total of "89 persons aboard the B-737". In addition, the report's section on injuries to persons describes a total of 101 persons involved in the accident, including 12 aboard the Metroliner and 89 aboard the Boeing 737. In addition, shortly after the accident, USAir officials reported to the press that 83 passengers and 6 flight crew were on board Flight 1493.)
- Crew: 6
- Fatalities: 23
- Injuries: 29
- Survivors: 66

Second aircraft
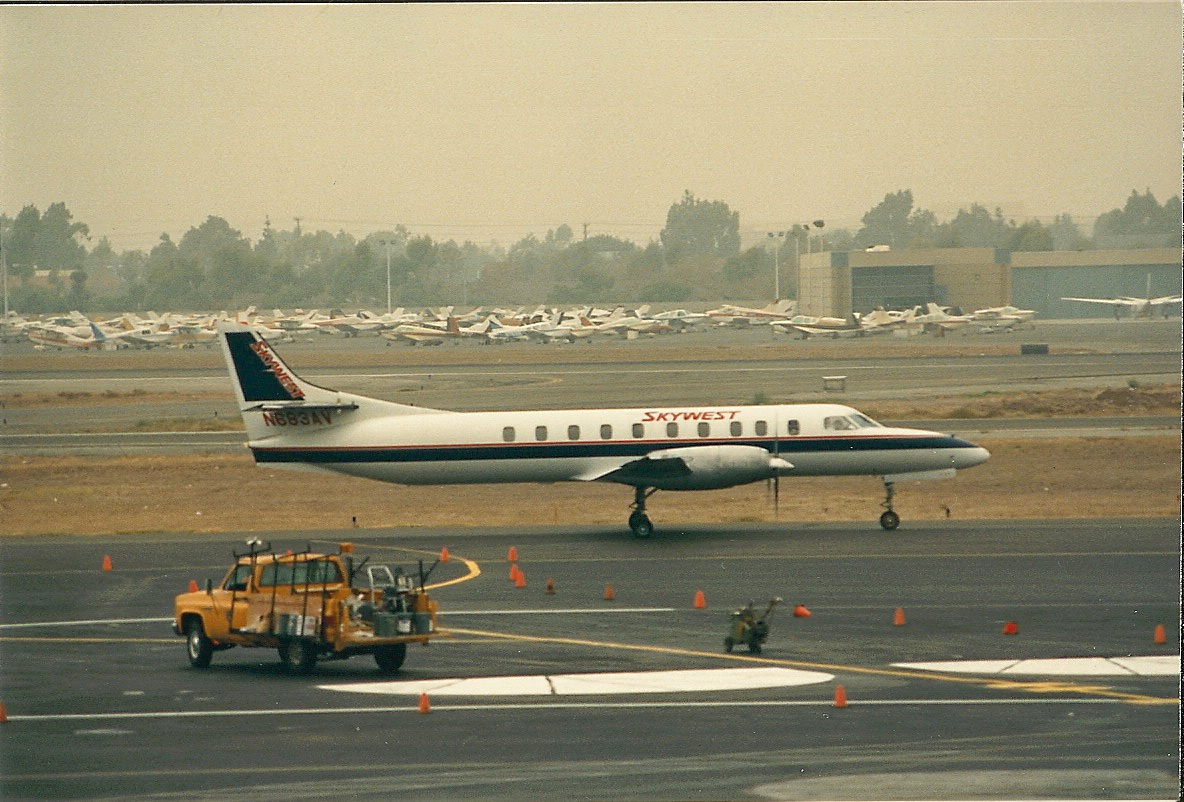
- N683AV, the Fairchild Swearingen Metroliner involved in the collision, seen in 1988
- Type: Fairchild Swearingen Metroliner
- Operator: SkyWest Airlines
- IATA flight No.: OO5569
- ICAO flight No.: SKW5569
- Call sign: SKYWEST 569
- Registration: N683AV
- Flight origin: Los Angeles International Airport
- Destination: LA/Palmdale Regional Airport
- Occupants: 12
- Passengers: 10
- Crew: 2
- Fatalities: 12
- Survivors: 0

On the evening of Friday, February 1, 1991, USAir Flight 1493, a Boeing 737-300, collided with SkyWest Airlines Flight 5569, a Fairchild Swearingen Metroliner turboprop aircraft, upon landing at Los Angeles International Airport (LAX). As Flight 1493 was on final approach, the local controller was distracted, though air traffic was not heavy at LAX, by a series of abnormalities, including a misplaced flight progress strip and an aircraft that had inadvertently switched off the tower frequency. The SkyWest flight was told to taxi into takeoff position, while the USAir flight was landing on the same runway.

Upon landing, the 737 collided with the smaller turboprop Metroliner, which was crushed beneath the larger USAir jet as it continued down the runway, caught fire, and veered into an airport fire station. Rescue workers arrived in minutes and began to evacuate the 737, but because of the intense fire, three of the 737's six exits were unusable, including both front exits; front passengers could only use one of the two overwing exits, causing a bottleneck. All 12 people aboard the smaller plane were killed, along with an eventual total of 23 of the 89 occupants of the 737, with 20 on the 737 caused by asphyxiation in the fire. One passenger from the 737 died from injuries 31 days later.

The National Transportation Safety Board (NTSB) found that the probable cause of the accident was the procedures in use at the LAX control tower, which provided inadequate redundancy, leading to a loss of situational awareness by the local controller, and inadequate oversight by the Federal Aviation Administration (FAA) for failing to supervise the control tower managers. The crash led directly to the NTSB's recommendation of using different runways for takeoffs and landings at LAX.

== Background ==
=== Aircraft and crew ===
USAir Flight 1493 was a scheduled service from Syracuse, New York, making stops at Washington, DC, Columbus, Ohio, and LAX, before continuing to San Francisco. On February 1, 1991, Flight 1493 was operated using a Boeing 737-300 (registration N388US); after a crew change in Washington, DC, it was under the command of Captain Colin Franklin Shaw (48), a highly experienced pilot with about 16,300 total flight hours (including more than 4,300 hours on the Boeing 737), and First Officer David T. Kelly (32), who had about 4,300 total flight hours, with 982 hours on the Boeing 737. Flying into LAX, the aircraft had 89 people on board (83 passengers, four flight attendants, and the two pilots).

On February 1, 1991, SkyWest Airlines Flight 5569 was operated using a twin-engined Fairchild Metroliner (registration N683AV). The flight was scheduled to depart LAX on the final leg of a multicity schedule, and was bound for Palmdale, California, with 10 passengers and two pilots aboard. The aircraft did not carry a cockpit voice recorder (CVR) or a flight data recorder (FDR), as it was not required to do so at the time. Both of Flight 5569's pilots had significant experience; Captain Andrew Lucas (32), had roughly 8,800 flight hours (with 2,101 of them on the Metroliner), and First Officer Frank Prentice (45), had over 8,000 flight hours, including 1,363 hours on the Metroliner.

=== Airport ===
LAX has four parallel runways, with the two runways and associated taxiways north of the terminal called the North Complex.

=== Air traffic control ===
The air traffic controller (ATC) in charge of takeoffs and landings in the LAX tower (the local controller) was Robin Lee Wascher. She had been working in the role since 1982, and began working at LAX in 1989. The clearance delivery controller in charge of taxiing aircraft was Francita Vandiver, who had previously served as an ATC in the US Navy. She had been working at LAX since 1988.

== Accident details ==
=== Flight ===
Diagram showing movement of the aircraft involved in the accident

Skywest 5569 was cleared by ATC Wascher in the LAX tower to taxi to Runway 24L, moving from gate 32 to the runway via taxiways Kilo, 48, Tango, and 45. (Note: Taxiway names Kilo, 48, Tango, and 45 were in use at the time of the accident; these taxiways were redesignated as Charlie, Sierra, Delta, and Delta10 after 1991.)

Immediately prior to SkyWest 5569 reaching runway 24L, a Wings West aircraft had landed on 24R and was awaiting permission to cross 24L and taxi to the terminal. The local controller attempted to contact the Wings West aircraft, but the crew had changed frequencies and did not answer, distracting Wascher as she attempted to reestablish communications. Shortly after 6 PM local time, as USAir 1493 was on final approach to LAX, the SkyWest Metroliner was cleared by the local controller to taxi into position and hold on Runway 24L at the intersection of taxiway 45, some 2,200 feet (670 m) up from the runway threshold. After four attempts by the local controller, the Wings West aircraft finally responded to the tower and apologized for switching frequencies. Wascher then cleared the USAir flight to land on 24L, even though the SkyWest Metroliner was still holding in takeoff position on the runway:

Abridged communication between USAir 1493 and the controllers, and among the USAir flight crew
# = Expletive; * = Unintelligible word; () = Questionable text; [] = Commentary; Shading = Radio communication
Time	Source	Content
18:05:44	Los Angeles tower	SkyWest seven twenty five tower.
18:05:47	SkyWest Airlines 725	Ah seven twenty five go ahead
18:05:48	Los Angeles tower	Yes sir. You're holding short, is that correct?
18:05:50	SkyWest Airlines 725	Yes ma'am, we're holding short.
18:05:51	Los Angeles tower	Thank-you. USAir fourteen ninety-three cleared to land runway two four left.
18:05:55	Captain	Cleared to land two four left fourteen ninety-three.

With this activity ongoing, another Wings West aircraft, a Metroliner similar to SkyWest 5569, called the tower reporting they were ready for takeoff. Wascher queried this aircraft about their position, and they told her they were holding on a taxiway short of 24L. The flight progress strip for this flight had not yet been given to Wascher by controller Vandiver (another distraction), and Wascher mistakenly thought this Metroliner was SkyWest 5569, and thus that the runway was clear of aircraft. The first officer of the USAir flight recalled hearing this conversation, but did not remember anyone being cleared to hold on the runway. Meanwhile, Wascher was busy handling other flights:

# = Expletive; * = Unintelligible word; () = Questionable text; [] = Commentary; Shading = Radio communication
Time	Source	Content
18:06:04	USAir 2858	Clear to land.
18:06:07	First officer	* looks real good *.
18:06:08	Wings West 5072	Tower wings west fifty seventy two is ready for takeoff.
18:06:09	Captain	Ahhh, you're coming outta five hundred feet bug plus twelve, sink is seven.
18:06:13	Los Angeles Tower	Wings fifty seventy two?
18:06:15	Wings West 5072	Affirmative.
18:06:16	[Sound of click]	
18:06:18	Los Angeles Tower	Wings fifty seventy two, are you at forty seven or full length?
18:06:19	Captain	Lights (on).
18:06:20	Wings West 5072	We're at full length.
18:06:21	Los Angeles Tower	Okay.
18:06:26	Los Angeles Tower	Hold short.
18:06:27	Wings West 5072	Roger, holding short.
18:06:30	Unknown	* *.
18:06:30	Los Angeles Tower	Wings fifty seventy two say your squawk.
18:06:33	Wings West 5072	Forty six fifty three.
18:06:46	Wings West 5212	Los Angeles tower wings west fifty two twelve with you on a visual for two four right.
18:06:55	Los Angeles Tower	SkyWest seven twenty five taxi into position and hold runway two four left.

The USAir plane touched down near the runway threshold. Just as the nose was being lowered, the first officer noticed SkyWest 5569 on the runway and applied maximum braking, but it was too late. The following was recorded on the CVR:

# = Expletive; * = Unintelligible word; () = Questionable text; [] = Commentary; Shading = Radio communication
Time	Source	Content
18:06:57	Voice unidentified	[unintelligible remark]
18:06:58	SkyWest Airlines 725	Seven twenty five position and hold two four left.
18:06:59	[Sound of impact]	
End of recording

The USAir plane slammed into the Metroliner, crushing it beneath its fuselage. The 737 proceeded to skid down the runway, then veered off the left side and came to rest on the far side of the taxiway against a closed fire station building, where it eventually caught fire. Large debris from the Metroliner – including its tail, wings, and right engine – were found on the runway and between the runway and the abandoned fire station.

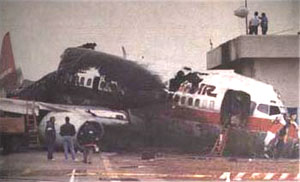
The wreckage of Flight 1493

=== Fatalities and injuries ===
Seating chart of US Airways Flight 1493 from the NTSB, revealing locations of passengers, lack of injury, the severity of injuries, and deaths

The 35 dead included all 12 people (10 passengers and both crew members) on SkyWest 5569, and 23 of the 89 aboard the USAir 1493 (21 passengers, Captain Shaw, and 22-year-old lead flight attendant Deanna Bethea). Two of the USAir fatalities were passengers who initially survived the crash, but died from burn injuries three and 31 days after the crash.

Captain Shaw was killed when the nose of the aircraft struck the abandoned fire station, crushing the section of the cockpit where his seat was located. Of the remaining passengers and crew aboard USAir 1493, two crew members and 10 passengers sustained serious injuries, 2 crew members and 15 passengers sustained minor injuries, and 37 passengers received no injuries. Billionaire businessman David H. Koch was among the survivors.

The majority of fatalities aboard USAir 1493 occurred to those seated in the front of the plane, where the post crash fire originated in the forward cargo hold, fed by a combination of fuel from the wreckage of SkyWest 5569 and gaseous oxygen from the 737's damaged crew oxygen system. Everyone seated in row 6 or forward was either killed or sustained major injuries, while everyone aft of row 17 escaped, some with minor injuries. Only two passengers and one crew member managed to escape from the forward service (R1) door, while the main cabin (L1) door was inoperable due to damage. Only two passengers used the left over-wing exit before the fire became too intense outside the aircraft. The majority of the survivors exited via the right over-wing exit, with the rest of the surviving cabin occupants escaping through the rear service (R2) door. The rear passenger (L2) door was briefly opened during the course of the accident, but was quickly closed due to the spreading fire on that side of the aircraft. Multiple issues slowed the evacuation from the right over-wing door, including a passenger seated in the exit row who could not open the door, a brief scuffle between two men at the exit, and the seatback of the exit window seat being folded forward, partially obstructing the exit.

From the location of the bodies, only two victims on USAir 1493 were found in their seats, while authorities believe that 17 had unbuckled their seat belts and died from smoke inhalation while making their way to the exits. According to James Burnett, who headed the National Transportation Safety Board (NTSB) investigation team, "I can't think of a recent accident where this many people have been up and out of their seats and didn't make it out." The captain was one of the few people who died of blunt force trauma, a blow to the head when the bulkhead collapsed as the aircraft collided with the firehouse. The first officer was rescued through the cockpit windows by some of the first firefighters to arrive on the accident scene.

Shaw was found to have traces of phenobarbital in his blood. The Federal Aviation Administration prohibits use of the sedative before flying. The drug was prescribed for irritable bowel syndrome by Shaw's physicians, who said they had warned him not to use the medication while flying.

== Investigation ==
First Officer David Kelly, who was flying the USAir 1493 during the accident leg, reported that he did not see SkyWest 5569 until he lowered the nose of his aircraft onto the runway after landing. Kelly also said that he applied the brakes, but did not have enough time for evasive action. Statements made by passengers who survived the crash were consistent with this testimony.

Local controller Wascher, who cleared both aircraft to use the same runway, testified before the NTSB and accepted blame for causing the crash. She said she originally thought the landing USAir plane had been hit by a bomb, then "realized something went wrong... I went to the supervisor and I said, 'I think this (the SkyWest plane) is what USAir hit.'" She testified that rooftop lights in her line of sight caused glare in the tower, making seeing small planes difficult at the intersection where the SkyWest plane was positioned. Just before the accident, she confused the SkyWest plane with another commuter airliner that was on a taxiway near the end of the runway. Making matters more difficult, the ground radar at LAX was not working on the day of the accident.

The NTSB's investigation of the crash revealed that the cockpit crew of the landing USAir jet could not see the commuter plane, which blended in with other airport lights. The NTSB cited LAX's procedures which placed much of the responsibility for runways on the local controllers, which directly led to the loss of situational awareness by the local controller. The NTSB also noted that during the previous performance review, a supervisor had noted four deficiencies in the local controller who ultimately worked the accident aircraft. These deficiencies were not addressed prior to the accident, and two of the deficiencies were apparent in the accident sequence—her loss of situational awareness and aircraft misidentification.

The NTSB's investigation of the crash revealed a failing system in the air- and ground-traffic control facilities at LAX: the ground radar system worked intermittently, and was not functioning at the time of the incident; the blind spot, from the control tower, when looking at the spot where SkyWest 5569 was waiting on the runway; the system for ground controllers in the tower to pass flight progress strips to the local controller did not support the local controller's workload; aircraft on runways were not required to turn on all their external lights until rolling for takeoff. All these issues were rectified at LAX following this incident.

At the time of the accident, ATCs at LAX used all four runways (North Complex runways 24L and 24R, South Complex runways 25L and 25R) for mixed takeoffs and landings. One of the NTSB recommendations was that the runways be segregated with only landings or departures taking place on an individual runway. This recommendation was implemented, but not until after another incident, when on August 19, 2004, a Boeing 747 landing on 24L passed only 200 feet (61 m) above a 737 holding on the same runway.

== Aftermath ==
LAX now prioritizes the use of the outboard runways (24R and 25L) for landings and the inboard runways (24L and 25R) for takeoffs, though mixed operations may occur in certain situations. Additionally, a new control tower was built at LAX, in a more central location, significantly taller and with a better vantage point, allowing visibility of all runways and critical taxiways at the airport.

Before this accident, the FAA issued a ruling that required airlines to upgrade the flammability standards of materials on board, but the USAir plane had been built before the effective date of those requirements and had not yet been modernized. It was scheduled to be upgraded within the next year. By 2009, all aircraft operating in the United States were compliant.

Air traffic controller Wascher, who bore the immediate responsibility for the crash, was adjudged to have made an error in adverse circumstances that any air traffic controller could have made and was not prosecuted or fired. She declined an offer to return to air traffic control and took a desk job at the FAA's western regional office.

== Dramatization ==
The story of the disaster was featured in a ninth-season episode of the Discovery Channel Canada / National Geographic series Mayday. The episode, titled "Cleared for Disaster", explores the events surrounding the crash and its investigation, including interviews with NTSB investigators, first responders, survivors, and witnesses. It was featured again in the show's twenty-fifth season, in an episode titled "No Exit."

It is featured in season 1, episode 3, of the TV show Why Planes Crash, in an episode called "Human Error".

TLC also aired a segment on the crash in the 1990s special called Terror in the Sky. It featured an interview with billionaire David Koch who survived the accident, as well as footage of the aftermath of the collision.

== See also ==
- Tenerife airport disaster – in 1977, the deadliest runway incursion in history, involving two 747s in dense fog
- 1983 Madrid Airport runway collision – a 1983 fatal runway incursion involving a DC-9 and a 727
- 1990 Wayne County Airport runway collision – a 1990 fatal runway incursion involving both a DC-9 and a 727
- 2001 Linate Airport runway collision – a 2001 fatal runway incursion involving an MD-87 and a Cessna Citation CJ2
- United Express Flight 5925 – a 1996 fatal runway incursion involving a Beechcraft 1900C and a King Air plane.
- 2024 Haneda Airport runway collision – a 2024 fatal runway incursion on runway 16L/34R at Haneda Airport involving an A350 and a coast guard DHC-8
