= United Express Flight 5925 =

1996 runway collision in Illinois

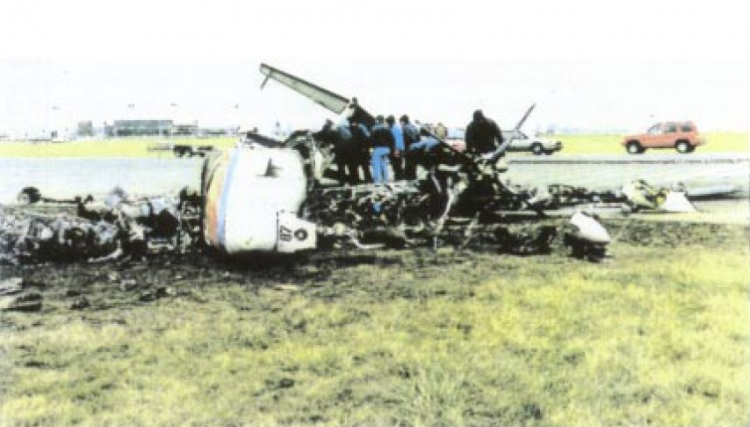
- Wreckage of Flight 5925

Accident
- Date: November 19, 1996
- Summary: Runway collision
- Site: Quincy Municipal Airport, near Adams, Illinois, United States; 39°56′27.4″N 91°11′39.3″W
- Total fatalities: 14
- Total survivors: 0

First aircraft
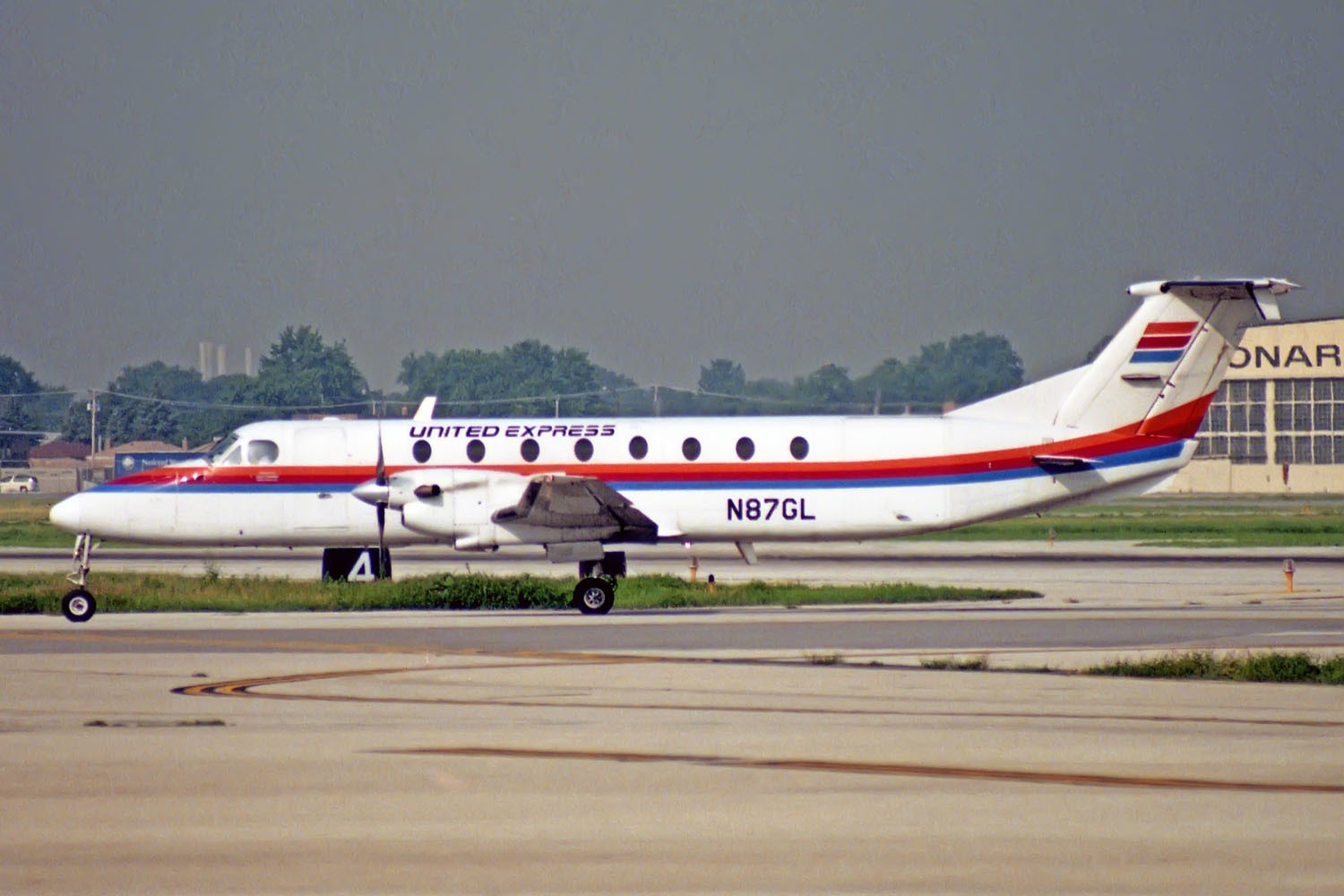
- N87GL, the Beechcraft 1900C involved in the collision, seen in August 1996
- Type: Beechcraft 1900C
- Operator: Great Lakes Airlines on behalf of United Express
- Call sign: LAKES AIR 251
- Registration: N87GL
- Flight origin: O'Hare International Airport, Chicago, Illinois, United States
- Stopover: Burlington Airport, Burlington, Iowa, United States
- Destination: Quincy Municipal Airport, Illinois, United States
- Occupants: 12
- Passengers: 10
- Crew: 2
- Fatalities: 12
- Survivors: 0

Second aircraft
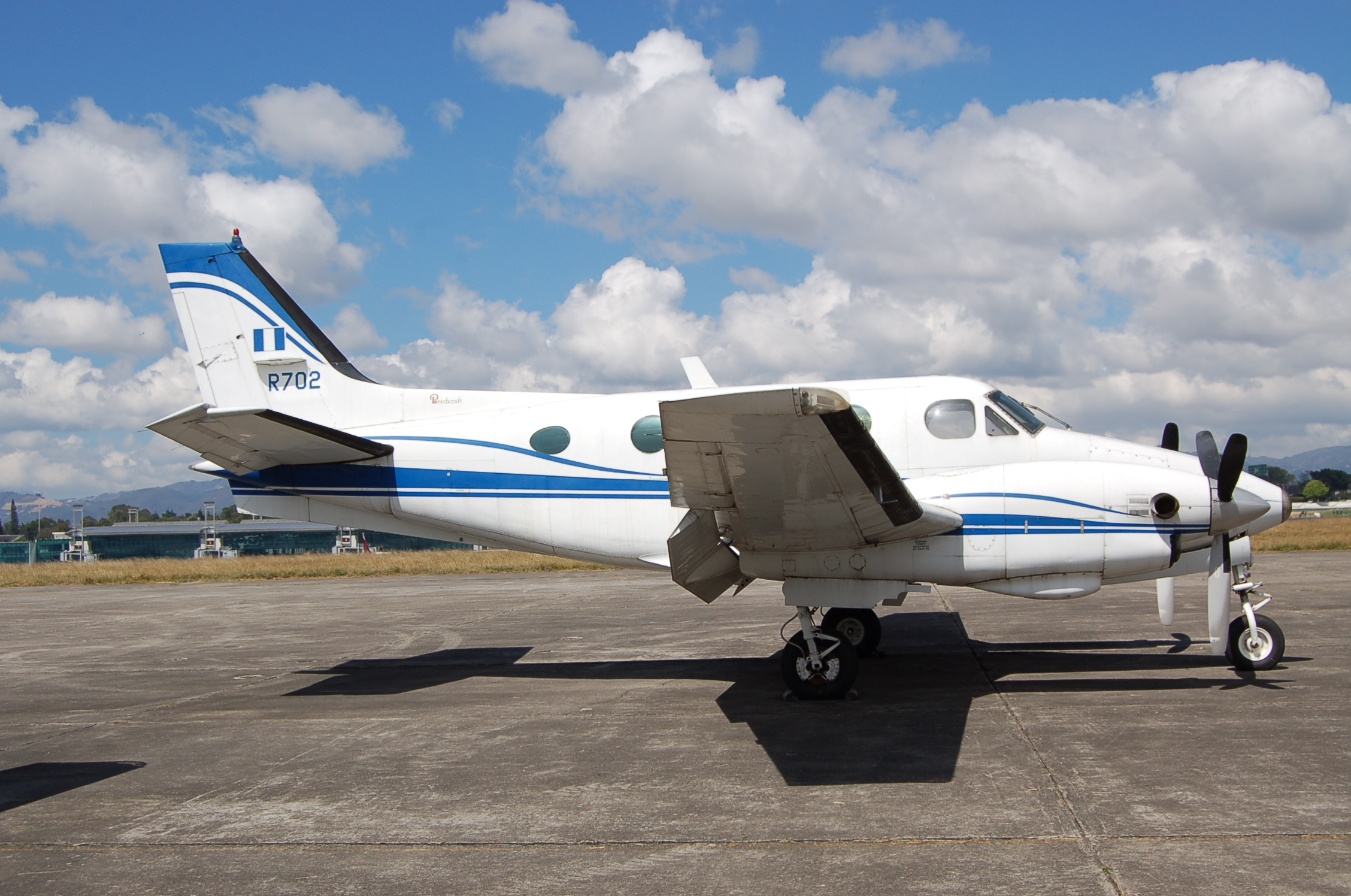
- A Beechcraft 65-A90 King Air, similar to the one involved in the collision
- Type: Beechcraft 65-A90 King Air
- Operator: Private
- Call sign: KING AIR 1127 DELTA
- Registration: N1127D
- Occupants: 2
- Passengers: 0
- Crew: 2
- Fatalities: 2
- Survivors: 0

United Express Flight 5925, operated by Great Lakes Airlines with a Beechcraft 1900 twin turboprop, was a regularly scheduled flight from Chicago O'Hare International Airport to Quincy, Illinois, with an intermediate stop in Burlington, Iowa. On November 19, 1996, the aircraft collided on landing at Quincy with another Beechcraft, a private King Air, that was taking off from an intersecting runway. All fourteen occupants (twelve on board the 1900 and two on board the King Air) were killed.

== Accident ==
United Express Flight 5925 had departed from Chicago at 15:25, with Captain Kate Gathje, First Officer Darin McCombs, and ten passengers. After a stop at Burlington, Iowa, the flight proceeded to Quincy. Two aircraft at Quincy were ready for departure when Flight 5925 was on approach. Both aircraft, a Beechcraft King Air and a Piper Cherokee, were proceeding to Runway 4. As Quincy is a non-towered airport, all three aircraft were communicating on the Common Traffic Advisory Frequency. On approach, Captain Gathje inquired as to whether the King Air would hold short of the runway, or depart before their arrival. After receiving no response, Gathje called again and received a reply from the Cherokee that they were holding short of Runway 4. However, because of a simultaneous sound emitted by the ground proximity warning system in the 1900's cockpit, only part of the transmission was received by the 1900. As a result, the United Express crew misunderstood the transmission as an indication that both the King Air and the Cherokee would not take off until after Flight 5925 had cleared the runway.

Assuming that both planes were holding short, Flight 5925 landed on Runway 13. However, the King Air had taxied into position on Runway 4 and had begun its takeoff roll when Flight 5925 landed. Both aircraft collided at the intersection of Runways 4 and 13. The aircraft skidded for 110 feet (34 m), coming to rest alongside Runway 13, and caught fire. All 12 aboard the United Express flight survived the initial impact but were trapped inside by a jammed door. Several pilots in the vicinity of the accident came to the scene but were unable to open the doors of the aircraft before both planes were destroyed by fire. All 12 aboard Flight 5925 and both pilots of the King Air, Neal Reinwald (63) and Laura Winkleman Brooks (34), died from smoke inhalation.

== Cause ==
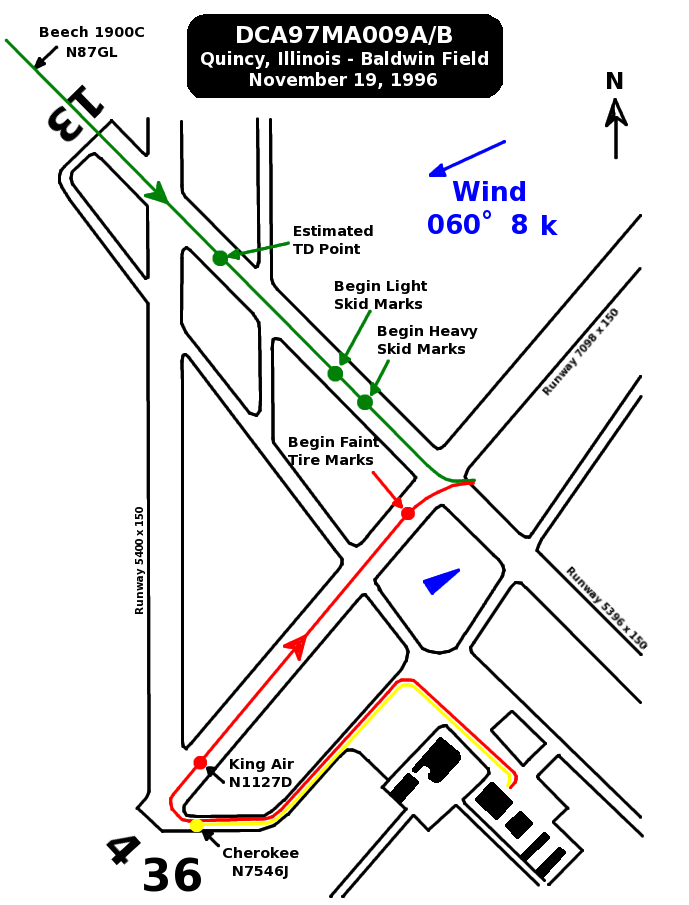
Birds eye diagram of the path of the two aircraft, with the King Air in red and United Express Flight 5925 in green.

The National Transportation Safety Board determined that the cause of the accident was the King Air pilots' failure to effectively monitor the common frequency and to scan for traffic. A contributing factor was the Cherokee's transmission at the same time as the United Express transmission. Lack of adequate rescue and firefighting equipment was cited as a factor in the high fatality rate.

== In popular culture ==
The accident was featured in the 15th season of the television documentary series Mayday in an episode titled "Fatal Transmission", which featured interviews with witnesses and accident investigators and a dramatic reenactment of the accident.

== See also ==
- 1991 Los Angeles airport runway collision
- Tenerife airport disaster
- Linate Airport disaster
- Madrid runway disaster
- 1990 Wayne County Airport runway collision
- TWA Flight 427
- Air Canada Flight 759
- 2024 Haneda Airport runway collision
