= 1972 Chicago–O'Hare runway collision =

1972 aviation accident

1972 Chicago–O'Hare runway collision North Central Airlines Flight 575 · Delta Air Lines Flight 954
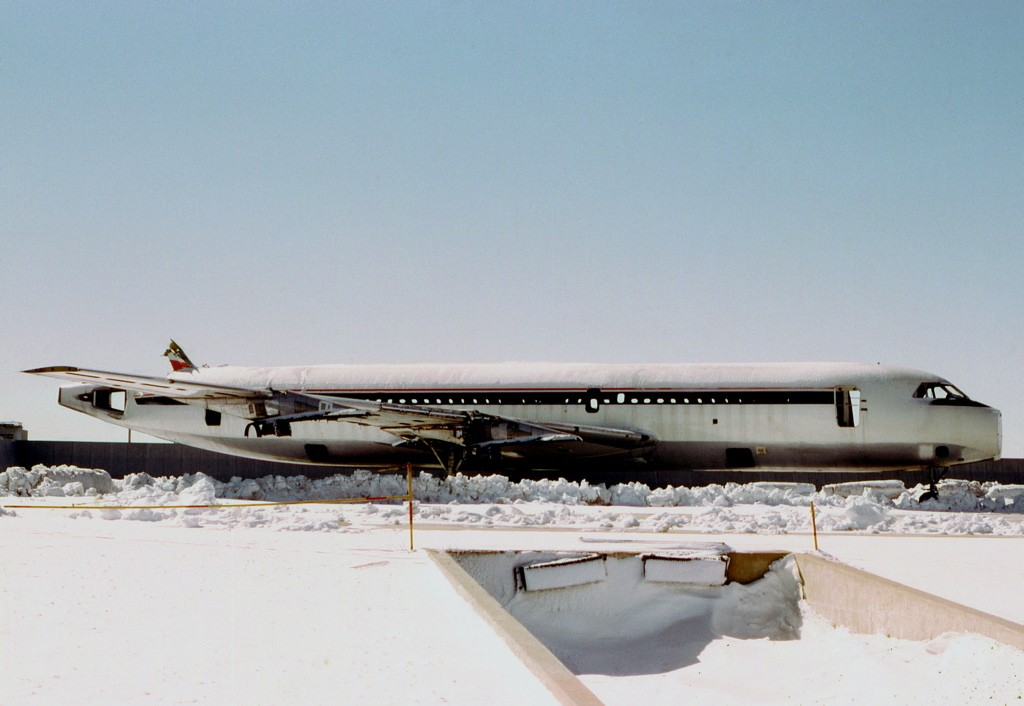
- The remains of the Delta Air Lines Convair 880 involved in the collision, stripped of parts and awaiting scrapping, photographed at O'Hare International Airport on January 31, 1974.

Accident
- Date: December 20, 1972
- Summary: Runway collision due to ATC and Pilot error on Delta aircraft.
- Site: O'Hare International Airport, Chicago, Illinois, United States; 41°58′09″N 87°54′04″W
- Total fatalities: 10
- Total injuries: 17
- Total survivors: 128

First aircraft
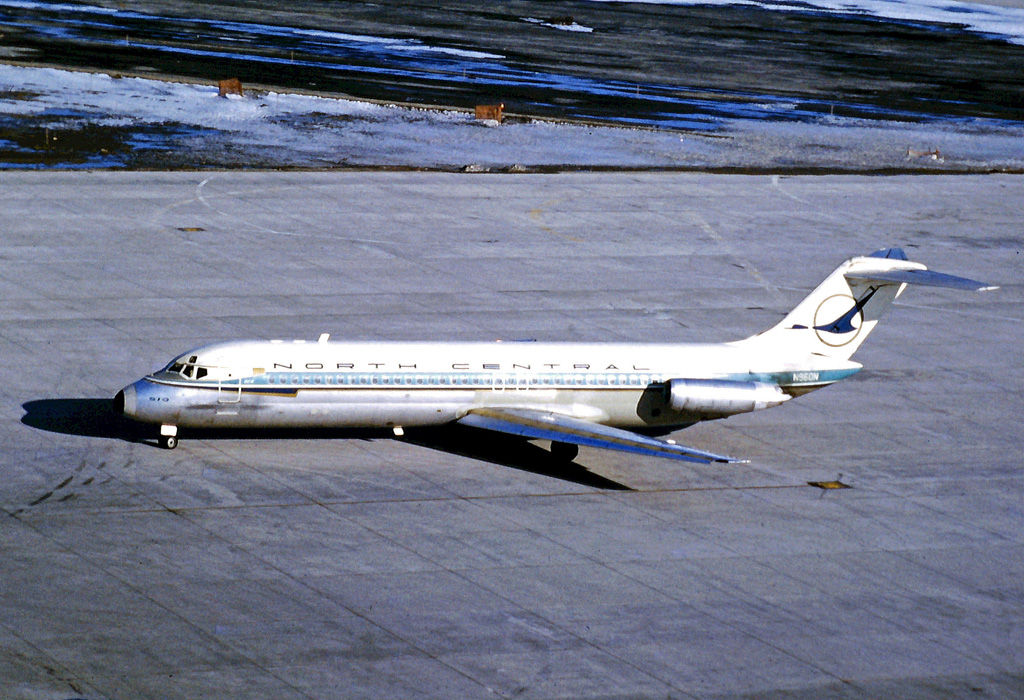
- A North Central Airlines DC-9, similar to the aircraft involved
- Type: McDonnell Douglas DC-9-31
- Operator: North Central Airlines
- IATA flight No.: NC575
- ICAO flight No.: NC575
- Call sign: NORTH CENTRAL 575
- Registration: N954N
- Flight origin: O'Hare International Airport, Chicago, Illinois, U.S.
- Stopover: Madison, Wisconsin, U.S.
- Destination: Duluth, Minnesota, U.S.
- Occupants: 45
- Passengers: 41
- Crew: 4
- Fatalities: 10
- Survivors: 35

Second aircraft
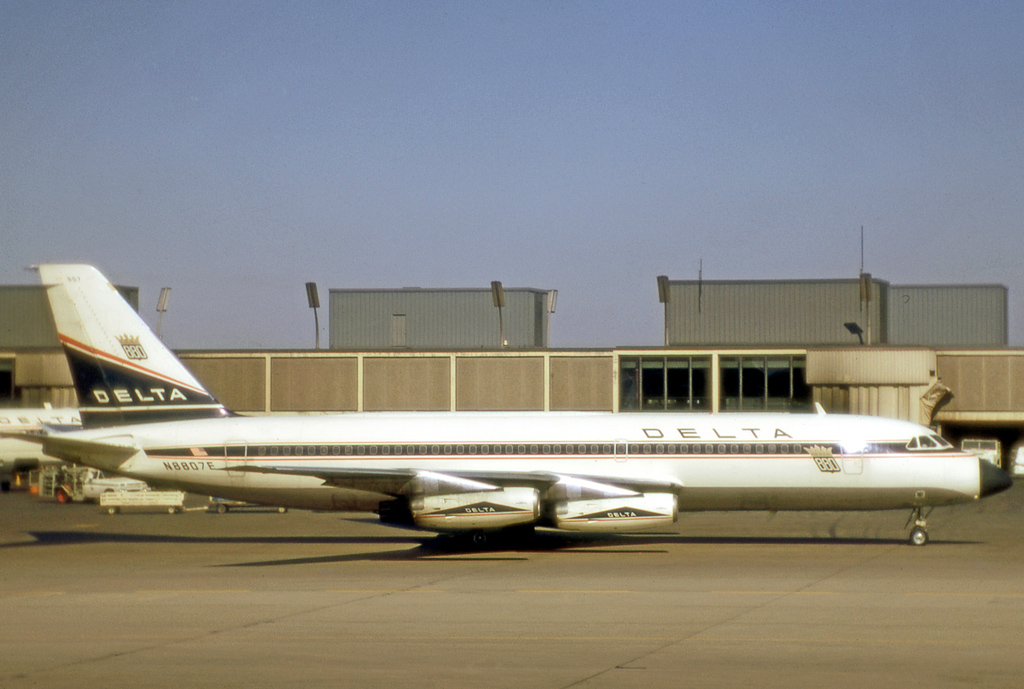
- N8807E, the second aircraft involved in the accident, seen in 1971
- Type: Convair CV-880
- Operator: Delta Air Lines
- IATA flight No.: DL954
- ICAO flight No.: DAL954
- Call sign: DELTA 954
- Registration: N8807E
- Flight origin: Tampa, Florida, U.S.
- Destination: O'Hare International Airport, Chicago, Illinois, U.S.
- Occupants: 93
- Passengers: 86
- Crew: 7
- Fatalities: 0
- Injuries: 2
- Survivors: 93

On December 20, 1972, North Central Airlines Flight 575 and Delta Air Lines Flight 954 collided on a runway at O'Hare International Airport in Chicago, Illinois, in the United States. Ten people died – all on the North Central aircraft – and 17 were injured in the accident. This was the second major airliner accident to happen in Chicago in December 1972; the other was United Air Lines Flight 553, which crashed 12 days earlier on approach to Midway Airport.

== Flight history ==
=== Delta Air Lines Flight 954 ===
Delta Air Lines Flight 954 was a regularly scheduled flight from Tampa, Florida, to O'Hare International Airport, Chicago, Illinois. The crew consisted of Captain Robert E. McDowell (36), First Officer Harry D. Greenberg (31), and Flight Engineer Claude F. Fletcher (29), as well as four flight attendants. Operating Convair CV-880 N8807E, it departed Tampa at 3:41 p.m. EST on December 20, 1972, and made a routine flight to Chicago, where it landed on Runway 14L at O'Hare International Airport at 5:55 or 5:56 p.m. CST. During their approach, the flight crew was informed that Runways 14L and 14R were being used for departures, but were never told that Runway 27L also was being used for departures.

Conditions at the airport were foggy, with a visibility of about one-quarter mile (400 m). Upon clearing Runway 14L, Flight 954 began taxiing southwest and south toward the terminal, leaving Runway 14L by way of the Bridge Route taxiway. It had already crossed the north–south bridge that carries the taxiway from Runway 14L to the terminal by the time the first officer contacted O'Hare ground control and reported that the aircraft was "inside [i.e., south of] the bridge", had not yet received a gate assignment, and needed to wait in a holding area until receiving an assignment.

The ground controller did not hear the words "inside the bridge," and, assuming Flight 954 had just left the end of Runway 14L and was still well north of the bridge, ambiguously instructed it to hold in the "thirty-two box", meaning in the controller's mind the 32R run-up pad at the southeast end of Runway 14L, where he assumed the plane to be. To reach the 32R run-up pad, Flight 954 would have had to turn around and return to the end of Runway 14L, where it had just landed, taxiing against the flow of traffic; instead, Flight 954's captain and first officer both assumed that the ground controller understood that they were "inside the bridge" and was referring to the 32L run-up pad, which was located at the southeast end of Runway 14R, on the other side of the terminal from the 32R run-up pad. Assuming that they were cleared to taxi to the 32L pad, they proceeded toward it using the Bridge, Outer Circular, and North–South taxiways, via a route that intersected with Runway 27L.

There was no further communication between Flight 954 and the ground controller. This left the ground controller with the assumption that Flight 954 was holding at the 32R run-up pad and in no danger of conflicting with other traffic and the flight crew with the assumption that they were cleared to taxi to the 32L run-up pad and could cross Runway 27L without danger of a collision with aircraft using that runway. Moreover, Flight 954's flight crew had never received word that Runway 27L was an active runway, and had no reason to anticipate encountering other aircraft while taxiing across it.

=== North Central Airlines Flight 575 ===
North Central Airlines Flight 575 was a regularly scheduled flight originating at O'Hare International Airport and stopping at Madison, Wisconsin, before terminating at Duluth, Minnesota. It was flown by Captain Ordell T. Nordseth (49) and First Officer Gerald Dale Adamson (32). Operating McDonnell Douglas DC-9-31 N954N, the flight received clearance from O'Hare ground control at 5:50 p.m. CST to taxi to Runway 27L for departure. At 5:58:52.3 p.m. CST the O'Hare local controller cleared Flight 575 into takeoff position on the runway and at 5:59:18 p.m. CST cleared it for takeoff. At 5:59:24.3 p.m. CST, the captain reported that he was beginning his takeoff roll.

== Collision ==
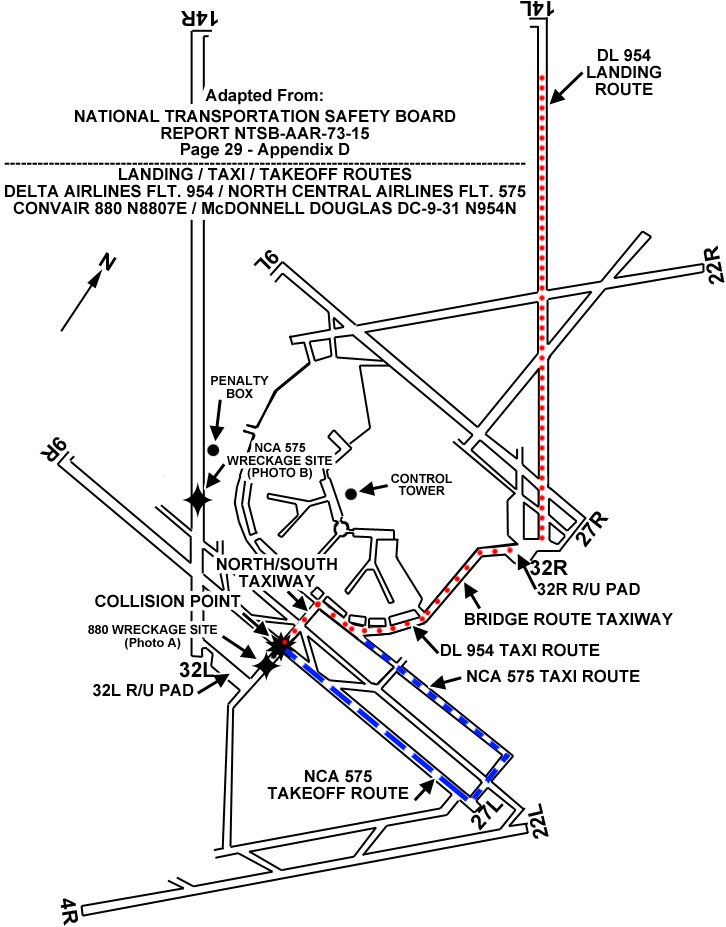
National Transportation Safety Board diagram from its accident report showing the paths of Delta Air Lines Flight 954 (dotted red line) and North Central Airlines Flight 575 (dashed blue line) at O'Hare International Airport in Chicago, Illinois, on December 20, 1972. The ground controller intended for Flight 954 to hold in the 32R run-up pad at right center, while Flight 954's flight crew intended to taxi to run-up pad 32L at lower left center via a route that intersected with Runway 27L. During its takeoff roll, North Central Flight 575 collided with Delta Flight 954 on Runway 27L at the point shown.

As the North Central DC-9 rolled down the runway, visibility was about 1/4 mile (400 m). It had reached a speed of about 140 knots (160 mph; 260 km/h) when its captain, peering ahead into the fog just after 6:00:03 p.m. CST, spotted Delta Flight 954 on the runway about 1,600 feet (500 m) ahead. At 6:00:07.2 p.m. CST, Flight 575's captain gave the order "Pull 'er up!" and he and the first officer pulled back on their control columns in an attempt to lift their DC-9 over the Delta CV-880. Although the DC-9 lifted into the air, it was too late to avoid contact with the CV-880, and the two aircraft collided at 6:00:08.3 p.m. CST.

The DC-9 tore off substantial portions of the CV-880's left wing and vertical stabilizer and caused three major compressions in the aft portion of its fuselage. The DC-9's right main landing gear detached during the collision, as did a flap from its right wing.

After the collision, the captain of Flight 575 determined that his DC-9 could not remain airborne, and attempted to land back on the runway. When he did, the plane's two remaining landing gear collapsed rearward, and the DC-9 skidded on its belly off Runway 27L, across a grassy area, and onto Runway 32L, where it came to a rest and immediately burst into flames.

The crew of Flight 954 apparently were unaware of the approaching DC-9 until they heard it strike their CV-880, and did not see the DC-9 until the first officer observed it crashing on the runway beyond them.

== Aircraft ==
The North Central aircraft involved, McDonnell Douglas DC-9-31 N954N, had been completed on December 27, 1967. It was destroyed in the collision.

The Delta aircraft involved, Convair CV-880 N8807E, had been completed on July 25, 1960. It was substantially damaged.

== Evacuation ==
=== Delta Air Lines Flight 954 ===
Immediately after the collision, the captain of Flight 954 received reports of a fire aboard the CV-880; he shut down the engines and ordered an immediate emergency evacuation. The crew opened the four emergency doors and deployed the emergency slides, and all aboard the plane were successfully evacuated in about five minutes without further incident.

=== North Central Airlines Flight 575 ===
After the DC-9 came to rest on Runway 32L, a fire broke out in the aft part of the plane, the cabin rapidly filled with smoke, and interior illumination in the passenger cabin was poor. The captain pulled the fire extinguisher handles and ordered an emergency evacuation. One passenger opened the right overwing door and escaped that way. One flight attendant opened the left overwing exit, exited the aircraft, and called on passengers to follow her; four passengers escaped via this door. The other flight attendant opened the main entry door and deployed the emergency slide, which did not inflate; she then was pushed out the door, but assisted passengers off the plane from outside the doorway. The captain entered the passenger cabin from the cockpit, calling passengers to come forward, then exited the plane via the main entry door and helped them to the ground before reboarding to assist more passengers off through the main door. The first officer escaped through a cockpit window and assisted passengers out of the aircraft from outside the plane at the main entry door. A total of 27 passengers exited via the main entry door.

== Rescue response ==
Due to the foggy conditions and limited visibility at the airport, it took controllers nearly two minutes to determine that something had happened to North Central Flight 575. Once they did, they alerted the Chicago Fire Department, which arrived at the scene on Runway 32L about a minute later, three minutes after the crash. Employing 11 crash and fire vehicles and two ambulances, the fire department extinguished the fire in about 16 minutes at around 6:19 p.m. CST.

Also because of the prevailing poor visibility, controllers and rescue personnel remained unaware of the collision, and Delta Flight 954's involvement, until 6:28 p.m. CST, 28 minutes after the collision, when fire department personnel discovered the damaged and evacuated CV-880 on the taxiway.

== Casualties ==
=== Delta Air Lines Flight 954 ===
Two people aboard the Delta CV-880 suffered minor injuries in the collision, but all 93 people aboard evacuated the aircraft without further injury.

=== North Central Airlines Flight 575 ===
A total of 10 people, all passengers, died aboard the North Central DC-9. Nine of the fatalities occurred in the post-collision fire among people who were unable to evacuate; the tenth person died later. Fifteen people aboard Flight 575 suffered non-fatal injuries.

== Investigation ==
The National Transportation Safety Board released its report on the accident on July 5, 1973. It found that the probable cause of the accident was the failure of the traffic control system to ensure adequate aircraft separation during a period of limited visibility. It noted that non-standard terminology – used to expedite traffic flow – was common in communications between controllers and aircrews at O'Hare International Airport and included the omission of words, altered phraseology, and use of colloquialisms. It found that the lack of clarity of wording on the part of the ground controller in his communications with Delta Flight 954 and the Delta crew's failure to request confirmation that their taxiing intentions matched those understood by the ground controller were the major causes of the accident. As a result, the controller was confused as to the location of the Convair CV-880, and neither the controller nor its flight crew realized that they were referring to different run-up pads as the holding area for Delta Flight 954.

The board also found that North Central's training program did not include any practice evacuations in simulated accident conditions, and that this lack of practical training on the part of the DC-9's crew meant that the evacuation of the aircraft took longer than it otherwise might have; the Federal Aviation Administration required that North Central Airlines make improvements. The NTSB also found that ground control radar was not used properly during the incident, as well as that the ground controllers were not required to be qualified in its use; it recommended that O'Hare International Airport adopt the standard method for its use as employed at other airports.

== See also ==
- Tenerife airport disaster
- 2001 Linate Airport runway collision
- 1983 Madrid Airport runway collision
- 1990 Wayne County Airport runway collision
