= Flight 350 =

Flight 350 may refer to:

- Japan Air Lines Flight 350, crashed on 9 February 1982
- Iberia Flight 350, crashed on 7 December 1983
