= Runway incursion =

Aviation incident involving the improper presence of an entity on a runway

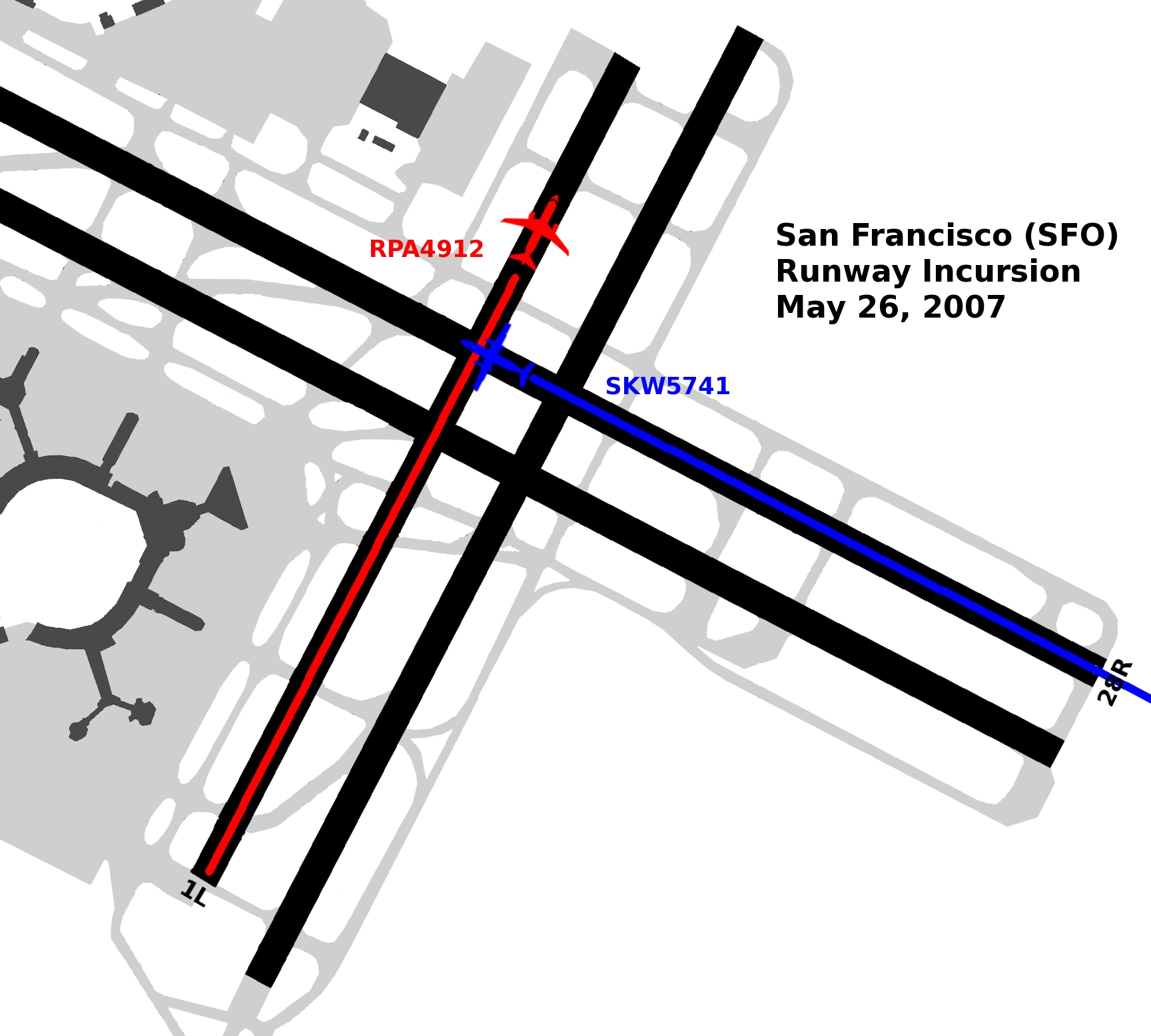
Visualization of the 2007 San Francisco International Airport runway incursion

A runway incursion is an aviation incident involving improper positioning of vehicles or people on any airport runway or its protected area. When an incursion involves an active runway being used by arriving or departing aircraft, the potential for a collision hazard or instrument landing system (ILS) interference can exist. At present, various runway safety technologies and processes are commonly employed to reduce the risk and potential consequences of such an event.

== Definition ==
The internationally-accepted definition of a runway incursion is:

Any occurrence at an aerodrome involving the incorrect presence of an aircraft, vehicle or person on the protected area of a surface designated for the landing and take off of aircraft.

— International Civil Aviation Organization (ICAO)., PANS-OPS Doc 4444, Ch.1

In the United States, the FAA classifies runway incursions into 3 types, with 5 levels of severity:

Runway incursion type
Operational incident	Action of an air traffic controller that results in less than required minimum separation between two or more aircraft, or between an aircraft and obstacles (vehicles, equipment, personnel) on runways or clearing an aircraft to takeoff or land on a closed runway.
Pilot deviation	Action of a pilot that violates any Federal Aviation Regulation, example: a pilot crosses a runway without a clearance while en route to an airport gate.
Vehicle/pedestrian deviation	Pedestrians or vehicles entering any portion of the airport movement areas (runways/taxiways) without authorization from air traffic control.
Runway incursion severity (descending order)
Accident	An incursion that resulted in a collision.
Category A	A serious incident in which a collision was narrowly avoided.
Category B	An incident in which separation decreases and there is a significant potential for collision, which may result in a time critical corrective/evasive response to avoid a collision.
Category C	An incident characterized by ample time and/or distance to avoid a collision.
Category D	Incident that meets the definition of runway incursion such as incorrect presence of a single vehicle/person/aircraft on the protected area of a surface designated for the landing and takeoff of aircraft but with no immediate safety consequences.

== Analysis ==
Audio of the 1 April 1999, runway incursion at Chicago O'Hare International Airport

Formal study of runway incursions began in the 1980s, following several high-profile near misses and fatal collisions of airliners operating on airport surfaces. One of the earliest reports on the topic was published in 1986 by the American National Transportation Safety Board (NTSB), titled Runway Incursions at Controlled Airports in the United States. Citing examples like the Tenerife airport disaster and the 1972 Chicago–O'Hare runway collision, a special investigation was opened "to investigate selected runway incursions to determine their underlying causes and to recommend appropriate remedial actions." After detailed examination of 26 incursion incidents occurring in 1985, investigators compiled a list of conclusions and safety recommendations. Among their findings were a need for clearer airport signage, improved controller supervision, and revised training procedures for aircrews and controllers. Despite the valuable data generated by the investigation, the NTSB conceded that, at the time, "the magnitude of the runway incursion problem could not be measured because of both incomplete reporting and follow-up investigations by the FAA."

Two years later in 1988, the Federal Aviation Administration issued its own report, Reducing Runway Incursions, with the purpose of establishing an integrated program for runway incursion reduction. Its general recommendations included:

- Establish a steering committee on runway incursion reduction
- Accelerate development and field deployment of Airport Movement Area Safety System technology
- Emphasize the analysis of pilot-related causal factors

In January 1991, the FAA published the first edition of its biennial Runway Incursion Plan (now known as the National Runway Safety Plan). The document introduced organizational and legislative reforms alongside new initiatives to leverage research on human factors, design, technological innovation, and professional development. In August 1992, however, a US General Accounting Office (GAO) congressional testimony criticized the agency's budgeting, delayed implementation, and inadequate reporting of the initiatives, especially its rollout of ASDE-3 radar and Traffic Collision Avoidance System (TCAS) technologies.

Despite newfound emphasis on runway incursion prevention, another fatal accident occurred on 3 December 1990, when eight people were killed after two Northwest Airlines flights collided in fog at Detroit Metropolitan Airport. The NTSB determined the accident's probable cause to be pilot error due to communication errors, inadequate crew resource management (CRM), and disorientation exacerbated by deficient airfield geometry. Additionally, the NTSB recommended stricter airport certification requirements under 14 CFR Part 139 in the areas of lighting and conspicuous markings/signage.

In 2000, research into incursions at uncontrolled and non-towered airports was conducted by the Aviation Safety Reporting System based on data gathered by interviewing pilots who had experienced a runway incursion. Interviews lasted around 45 minutes to 1 hour, and the data was de-identified for FAA use in developing safety measures.

In 2005, the FAA assisted ICAO in its creation of a formal, internationally-accepted definition of a runway incursion. The new verbiage was first added to the fourteenth edition of PANS-OPS Doc 4444, but it was not until 1 October 2007, that the FAA finally adopted the ICAO definition. Previously, the FAA had maintained that an incursion only included incidents in which a potential traffic conflict existed. An event without a potential conflict– such as an unauthorized aircraft crossing an empty runway– had been defined as a 'surface incident'.

As of 2017, the last fatal runway incursion accident involving a U.S. Federal Aviation Regulations Part 121 air carrier was in 2006.

Between 2011 and 2017, 12,857 runway incursions were reported in the United States. Between October 2016 and September 2017, 1,341 were reported. Of these, six were placed in the most serious categories A and B. Four of these were considered ATC incidents, and two were "pilot deviations". Of the 1,341 incidents, 66 percent were caused by pilot deviation, 17 percent were vehicle/pedestrian incidents, 16 percent were air traffic control (ATC) incidents, and 1 percent were "other".

An FAA study of the year ending September 2016, found that of 361 runway incursions attributed to pilot deviation, 27 percent resulted from "pilot failed to hold short of runway as instructed", and 14.7 percent from "pilot failed to hold short of runway". 5 percent of pilot deviations were classified as the pilot failing to comply with an ATC clearance. In 3.4 percent of deviations, the pilot departed without a departure clearance.

The NASA Aviation Safety Reporting Service (ASRS) received 11,168 reports of runway incursions between January 2012 and August 2017, at a rate of approximately 2000 per year. More than 40 percent of reports were filed by general aviation pilots, and 36 percent by air carrier pilots. Factors included situational awareness, communication breakdown, confusion, and distraction.

== Technology ==
The Airport Surface Detection Equipment, Model X (ASDE-X) and the Airport Movement Area Safety System (AMASS) are computerized systems that are intended to alert air traffic controllers to the potential for a runway incursion.

The Honeywell Runway Awareness and Advisory System alerts pilots to the potential for a runway incursion.

== List ==
=== List of runway collision accidents with fatalities ===
Date	Accident	Fatalities	Injuries	Aircraft/vehicles	Airport	Reports
2026-03-22	Air Canada Flight 8646	2	42	Bombardier CRJ-900 and ARFF engine	LaGuardia Airport, New York	
2024-01-02	2024 Haneda Airport runway collision	5	18	Airbus A350-900 and De Havilland Canada Dash 8-Q300	Haneda Airport, Tokyo,	interim (in Japanese) interim (in English)
2022-11-18	LATAM Airlines Perú Flight 2213	3	40	Airbus A320neo and airport crash tender	Jorge Chávez International Airport, Lima	final (in Spanish)
2014-10-20	Unijet Flight 074P	4	1	Dassault Falcon 50 and snowplow	Vnukovo International Airport, Moscow	final (in English) final (in Russian)
2001-10-08	2001 Linate Airport runway collision	118	4	McDonnell Douglas MD-87 and Cessna Citation CJ2	Linate Airport, Milan	final
1996-11-19	United Express Flight 5925	14	0	Beechcraft 1900 and Beechcraft King Air	Quincy Regional Airport, Quincy, Illinois	final
1994-11-22	1994 St. Louis Airport collision	2	8	McDonnell Douglas MD-82 and Cessna 441	St. Louis Lambert International Airport, Bridgeton, Missouri	final
1991-02-01	1991 Los Angeles runway collision	35 (Note: One passenger initially survived the crash, but died 31 days later. The NTSB final report lists 34 fatal injuries, because at that time only deaths within 3 days of an accident count as fatal injuries.)	29	Boeing 737-300 and Fairchild Swearingen Metroliner	Los Angeles International Airport, Los Angeles	final
1990-12-03	1990 Wayne County Airport runway collision	8	10	McDonnell Douglas DC-9-14 and Boeing 727-200 Advanced	Detroit Metropolitan Wayne County Airport, Metro Detroit	final
1984-10-11	Aeroflot Flight 3352	178	2	Tupolev Tu-154B-1 and maintenance vehicles	Omsk Airport, Omsk	
1983-12-20	Ozark Air Lines Flight 650	1	2	McDonnell Douglas DC-9-31 and snowplow	Sioux Falls Regional Airport, Sioux Falls	final
1983-12-07	1983 Madrid Airport runway collision	93	30	Boeing 727-200 and McDonnell Douglas DC-9-32	Madrid–Barajas Airport, Madrid	final
1982-08-14	1982 Sukhumi Dranda Airport runway collision	11	Unspecified	Tupolev Tu-134A and Let L-410M Turbolet	Sukhumi Babushara Airport, Sukhumi	
1978-02-11	Pacific Western Airlines Flight 314	43	≥5	Boeing 737-200 and snowplow (Note: The aircraft and the snowplow did not make contact, but the 737 crashed while performing an evasive go-around manoeuvre due to inadvertent thrust reverser deployment.)	Cranbrook/Canadian Rockies International Airport, Cranbrook	final
1977-03-27	Tenerife airport disaster	583	61	Boeing 747-100 and Boeing 747-200	Los Rodeos Airport, Tenerife	final (in Spanish) final (in English)
1974-04-18	Court Line Flight 95	1	1	BAC One-Eleven and Piper PA-23 Aztec	London Luton Airport, Luton	final
1972-12-20	1972 Chicago–O'Hare runway collision	10	17	McDonnell Douglas DC-9-31 and Convair CV-880	O'Hare International Airport, Chicago	final
1936-06-24	Carlos Gardel death	17	6	Two Ford Trimotors	Olaya Herrera Airport	

=== Category A runway incursion incidents ===
==== United States ====
The following table lists Category A runway incursion incidents in the United States since 2001. This table only includes incidents in which all involving planes were operating under FAR Part 121 and Part 129, and were investigated by both FAA and NTSB. Note that the Category rank of Air Canada Flight 759 incident in 2017 was "N/A" according to the FAA Runway Safety database, so it is not in the following table.

Date	Airport	Flights	Aircraft	Closest proximity	Refs
2023-02-04	Austin–Bergstrom International Airport, Austin, TX	Southwest Airlines Flight 708 and FedEx Express Flight 1432	Boeing 737-700 and Boeing 767-300ERF	150 to 170 feet (46 to 52 meters)	NTSB docket FAA
2017-02-15	San Francisco International Airport, San Francisco, CA	Compass Airlines Flight 6081 and Virgin America Flight 920	ERJ 170-200 and Airbus A320-214	Vertical: about 125 feet (38m)	NTSB docket FAA
2015-02-17	O'Hare International Airport, Chicago, IL	American Eagle Flight 3084 and United Express Flight 3710	Embraer ERJ-145LR and Bombardier CL-600-2C10	Between center: about 94 feet (29m); Between wingtips: 20 to 30 feet (6 to 9 meters)	NTSB docket FAA
2011-08-08	O'Hare International Airport, Chicago, IL	Chautauqua Airlines Flight 5021 and Trans States Airlines Flight 3367	Embraer ERJ-135 and Embraer ERJ-145	Vertical: within 125 feet (38m); Horizontal: within 350 feet (107m)	NTSB docket FAA
2007-07-11	Fort Lauderdale-Hollywood Airport, Fort Lauderdale, FL	United Airlines Flight 1544 and Delta Air Lines Flight 1489	Airbus A320 and Boeing 757	Lateral: 230 feet (70m)	NTSB; FAA
2007-05-26	San Francisco International Airport, San Francisco, CA	Republic Airlines Flight 4912 and Skywest Airlines Flight 5741	Embraer 170 and Embraer 120	Tower's estimate: 300 feet Skywest crew's estimate: 30 to 50 feet RPA4912 crew's estimate: 150 feet	NTSB; FAA
2006-03-21	O'Hare International Airport, Chicago, IL	Lufthansa Flight 437 and Chautauqua Flight 7826	Airbus A319 and Embraer ERJ 145EP	100 feet (30m)	NTSB; FAA
2005-06-09	General Edward Lawrence Logan International Airport, Boston, MA	Aer Lingus Flight 132 and US Airways Flight 1170	Airbus A330-301 and Boeing 737-300	171 feet (52m)	NTSB docket FAA

==== Other ====
Date	Airport	Summary	Reports
2024-07-27	Afonso Pena International Airport; São José dos Pinhais, Brazil	A Total Linhas Aéreas Boeing 727-2M7 (registration: PR-TTO) was performing a cargo flight. While taking off from Runway 15, it crossed paths with a vehicle that had entered the runway. The vehicle was towing a lighting tower. The aircraft’s right wing passed at an approximate distance of six meters from the lighting tower.	final (in Portuguese) final (in English)

== See also ==
- Runway excursion
- Ground collision
