= Flight strip =

Flight strip may refer to:

- Airfield
- Flight progress strip
