= Marc Raubenheimer =

South African pianist

Marc Raubenheimer (Durban, 31 March 1952 – Madrid, 7 December 1983) was a South African pianist.

== Early life ==
Raubenheimer was taught by Miss Ethel Kerkin of Durban North, South Africa, who mentored him throughout his life. Raubenheimer was educated by many performing pianists including Alicia de Larrocha, who took a special interest in Raubenheimers' musical career and was a friend of him. Of Miss Kerkin, Raubenheimer is remembered to have said that when he needed a "proper lesson" he came back to her. He memorized the 24 Bach Preludes and Fugues over a weekend as financial constraints forced him to borrow the music on short loan.

== Later years ==
Later, as a disciple of Friedrich Gulda in Munich, he graduated in London, debuting at the Wigmore Hall in 1978. For the next years, he settled in London and took part in the musical scene of the city while he made headway to the American scene, debuting in Carnegie Hall. He extended his concerts through Austria, Germany and Switzerland and performed regularly in his homeland, where he was awarded with the South African Radio prize.

Raubenheimer was the first guest soloist who performed with then newly formed KwaZulu Natal Philharmonic Orchestra (South Africa) in September 1983. In a busy opening season he played 2 concerts a week for 3 weeks, in the cities of Durban and Pietermaritzburg, performing the five Beethoven piano concertos, conducted by David Tidboald.

His discographical debut (Decca), a Schumann monographic, was arranged for Spring 1984. Raubenheimer's performance of Schumann repertoire was described by critics as sublime, and one of the best interpretations heard at the time.

== Awards ==
In 1982, Raubenheimer won the Paloma O'Shea Santander International Piano Competition.

== Death ==
While traveling to the final recital entailed by the prize on 7 December 1983, he was killed in a collision of airliners in Madrid, Spain.
