= PANS-OPS =

Procedures for Air Navigation Services – Aircraft OPerationS

PANS-OPS is an air traffic control acronym which stands for Procedures for Air Navigation Services – Aircraft OPerationS. PANS-OPS are rules for designing instrument approach and departure procedures. Such procedures are used to allow aircraft to land and take off when instrument meteorological conditions (IMC) impose instrument flight rules (IFR).

== ICAO rules ==
The Flight Safety section of International Civil Aviation Organization (ICAO) is responsible for PANS-OPS, which outlines the principles for airspace protection and procedure design to which all ICAO signatory states must adhere. The regulatory material surrounding PANS-OPS may vary from country to country.

== Handling of obstacles ==
Chapter 4 of Annex 14 to the Convention on International Civil Aviation "[establishes] a series of obstacle limitation surfaces that define the limits to which objects may project into the airspace" surrounding an aerodrome. PANS-OPS defines "protection surfaces" which are imaginary surfaces in space that guarantee an aircraft a certain minimum obstacle clearance, similar to the purpose of obstacle limitation surfaces (OLS) in Annex 14. These surfaces may be used as a tool for local governments in assessing building development. Where buildings may (under certain circumstances) be permitted to penetrate the OLS, they cannot be permitted to penetrate any PANS-OPS surface, because the purpose of these surfaces is to guarantee that aircraft operating under instruments are free of obstacles on an approach or departure.

== Other PANS ==
- PANS-ATM: Procedures for Air Navigation Services – Air Traffic Management (ICAO Doc. 4444)
- PANS-TRG: Procedures for Air Navigation Services – Training (ICAO Doc. 9868)
- PANS-AD (PANS-Aerodrome, ICAO Doc 9981)
- PANS-OPS (Aircraft operations, ICAO Doc 8168)
- PANS-ABC (Abbreviations and codes, ICAO Doc 8400)
- PANS-AIM (Aeronautical information management, ICAO Doc 10066)

== History of Pans-Ops software ==
In 1989 the very first commercially available off the shelf instrument procedure design software (Wavionix) conforming to ICAO document 8168 Pans-Ops was programmed by Ian Whitworth. This software was first demonstrated at Bailbrook College in Bath, England in 1992 to a procedure design course. Prior to this all procedure design was done with pencil, tracing paper and a calculator. The software was programmed on a 386 IBM laptop computer and written in the "LISP" programming language.

== PANS-OPS software Nowadays ==
On the internet, you can find examples of modern PANS operations, as well as the software and language used to program them:

1) FPDAM from IDS AirNav (an ENAV group company), used in more than 80 organizations, among ANSP/CAA, military agencies

2) AirNavCAD (Online software). Used in Europe, Asia, America and Australia to make PANS-OPS.

3) ASAP – PHX – Used by CAAs in 13 countries and 9 ANSPs throughout the world

4) Global Procedure Designer (GPD) - 49North (MDA Space). Used by large military and ANSP organizations around the world.
