= Flight progress strip =

Tracking tool used in air traffic control

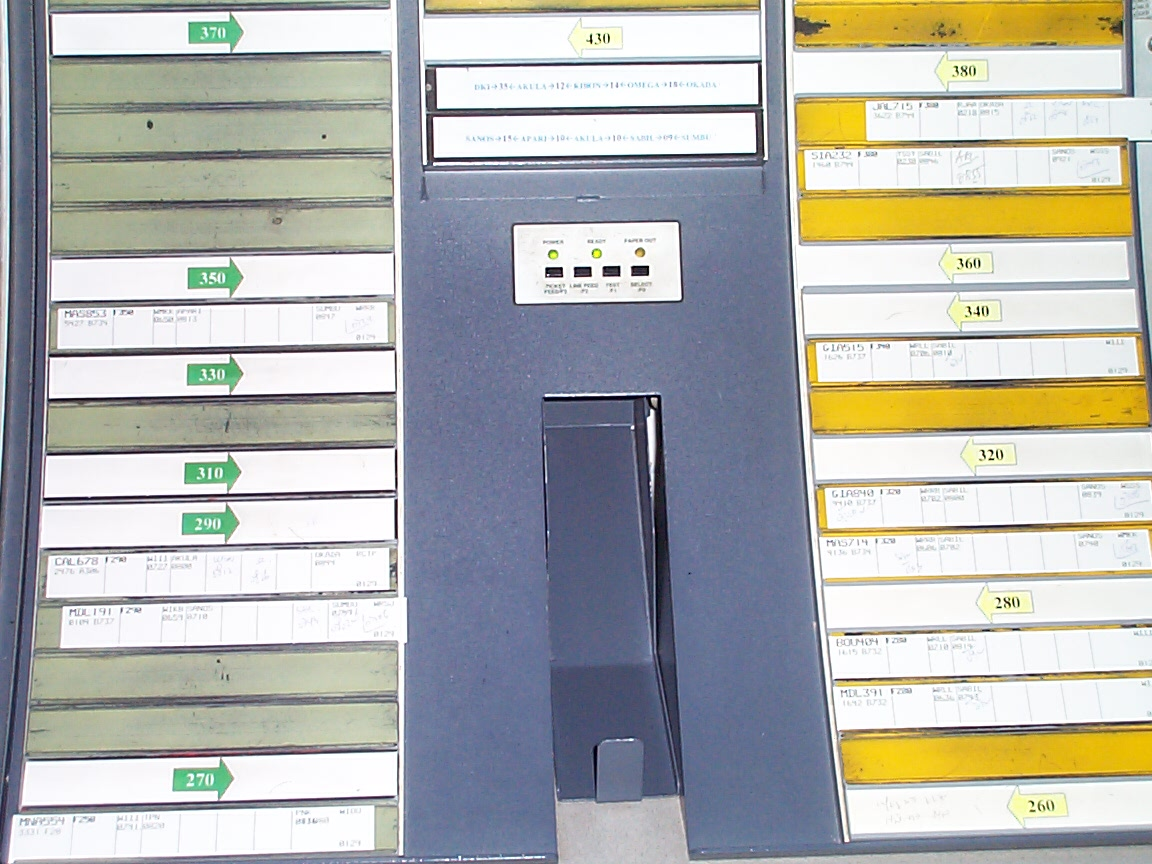
A strip bay at a high-altitude procedural area control sector in Indonesia

A flight progress strip or flight strip is a small strip of paper used to track a flight in air traffic control (ATC). While it has been supplemented by more technologically advanced methods of flight tracking since its introduction, it is still used in modern ATC as a quick way to annotate a flight, to keep a legal record of the instructions that were issued, to allow other controllers to see instantly what is happening and to pass this information to other controllers who go on to control the flight.

== Positioning ==
The strip is mounted in a plastic boot called a 'strip holder' and placed with other strips in a 'strip board' which is then used as a representation of all flights in a particular sector of airspace or on an airport. The color of the strip holder itself often has a meaning. The strip board has vertical rails that constrain the strips in several stacks ('bays').

The position of the strip in the board is a significant part of the information of the strip board: approach and area controllers typically keep their strips in level/altitude order, whereas tower controllers use the bays to represent the ground, the runway and the air. Each bay might be further sub-divided using 'designator strips' and metal bars to allow even more information to be portrayed by the position of a flight progress strip. Other special strips can be used to indicate special airspace statuses, or to represent the presence of physical obstructions or vehicles on the ground. They may even be used to provide a quick reminder to the controller of other pertinent information, e.g. the time when night begins or ends.

== Content ==
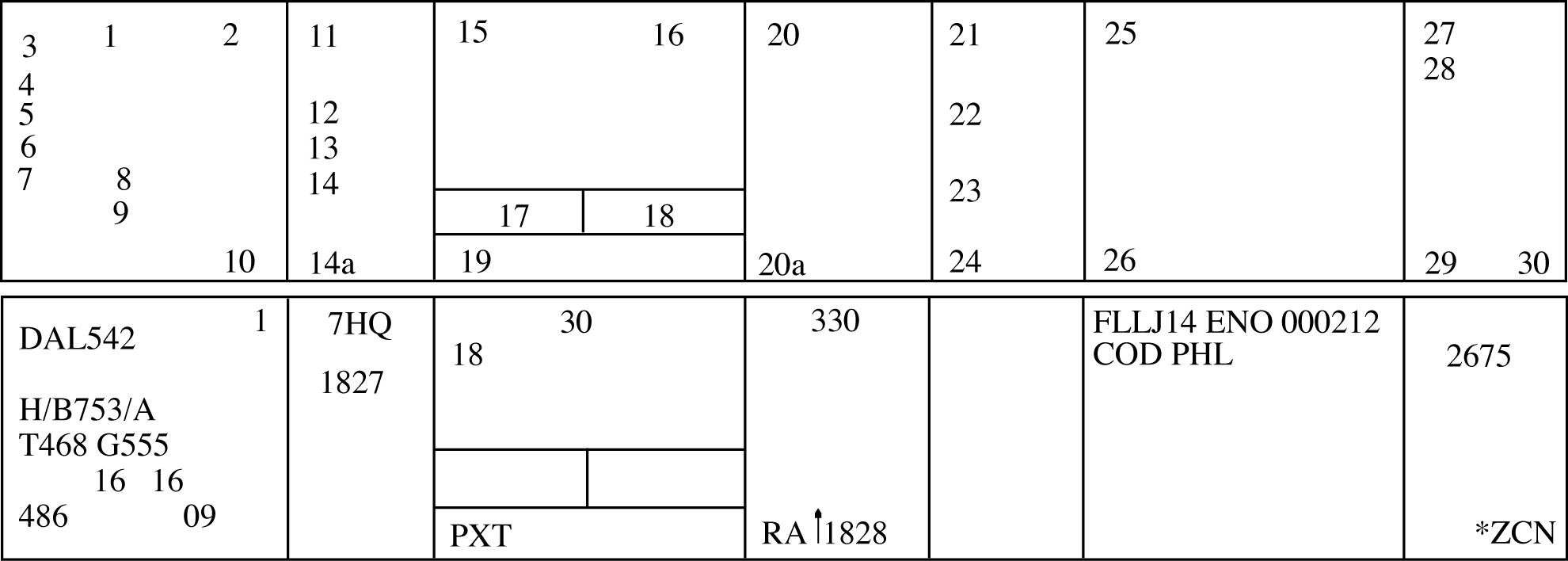
A blank and a filled-out example of a US en-route flight progress strip

There are many styles of progress strip layouts, but minor differences aside, a strip contains at least:

- Aircraft identification (e.g. aircraft registration or a flight number)
- Aircraft type as the relevant 4-letter ICAO designator (e.g. B744 for a Boeing 747-400)
- Level (assigned altitude)
- Departure and destination
- At least one time in four figures (other times can be shortened to minutes only).

Other information may be added as required.

== Use ==
After processing the flight plan, computers will send flight strips to the tower, to the radar facility that handles the departure route, and to the Center controller whose sector the flight first enters. These strips are delivered approximately 30 minutes prior to the proposed departure time. Strips are delivered to en route facilities 30 minutes before the flight is expected to enter their airspace.

In addition a strip may be "cocked out", or offset, from normal alignment to highlight potential issues. This can be used either as a personal reminder or as a form of communication between controllers.

For filed flight plans, strips are initially printed from a computer and often contain more information than this. Further information is then added by controllers and assistants in various colored pens to show the role of person making the annotation. For 'free-calling' aircraft (generally smaller aircraft transiting airspace), strips must be fully hand-written by the controller or assistant from information passed by radio.

== Replacement by computers ==
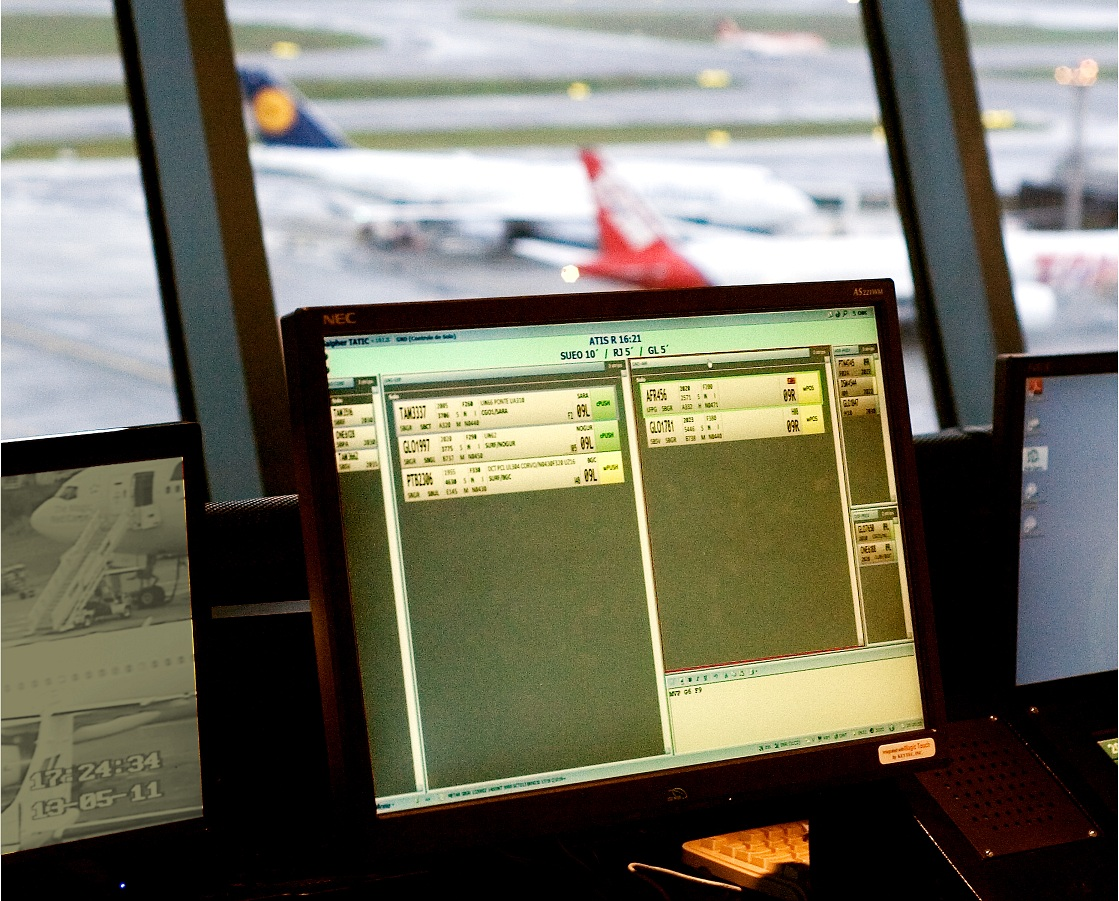
An electronic flight progress strip

In some countries, strips have been replaced by electronic equivalents. These generally use touch-screens to show the flight information, while still trying to keep some of the physical aspects of paper strips and strip racks. This is not always a problem-free transition, since physical strips have many characteristics that a computer system cannot replicate. In fact, the term "handoff," which is used today to denote the computerized transfer of control of an aircraft from one sector or frequency to another, comes from the older technique of physically handing off the flight progress strip to the next controller to denote the transfer of responsibility.

This technique is still used today within some control towers; for example, the ground controller may physically hand the strip to the local controller as the aircraft reaches the runway, or the local controller will drop the strip and strip holder down a chute to the departure radar controller in the room below, once the aircraft has been cleared for takeoff.
