= 2001 Linate Airport runway collision =

2001 runway collision in Italy

2001 Linate Airport runway collision Scandinavian Airlines System Flight 686 · Air Evex D-IEVX
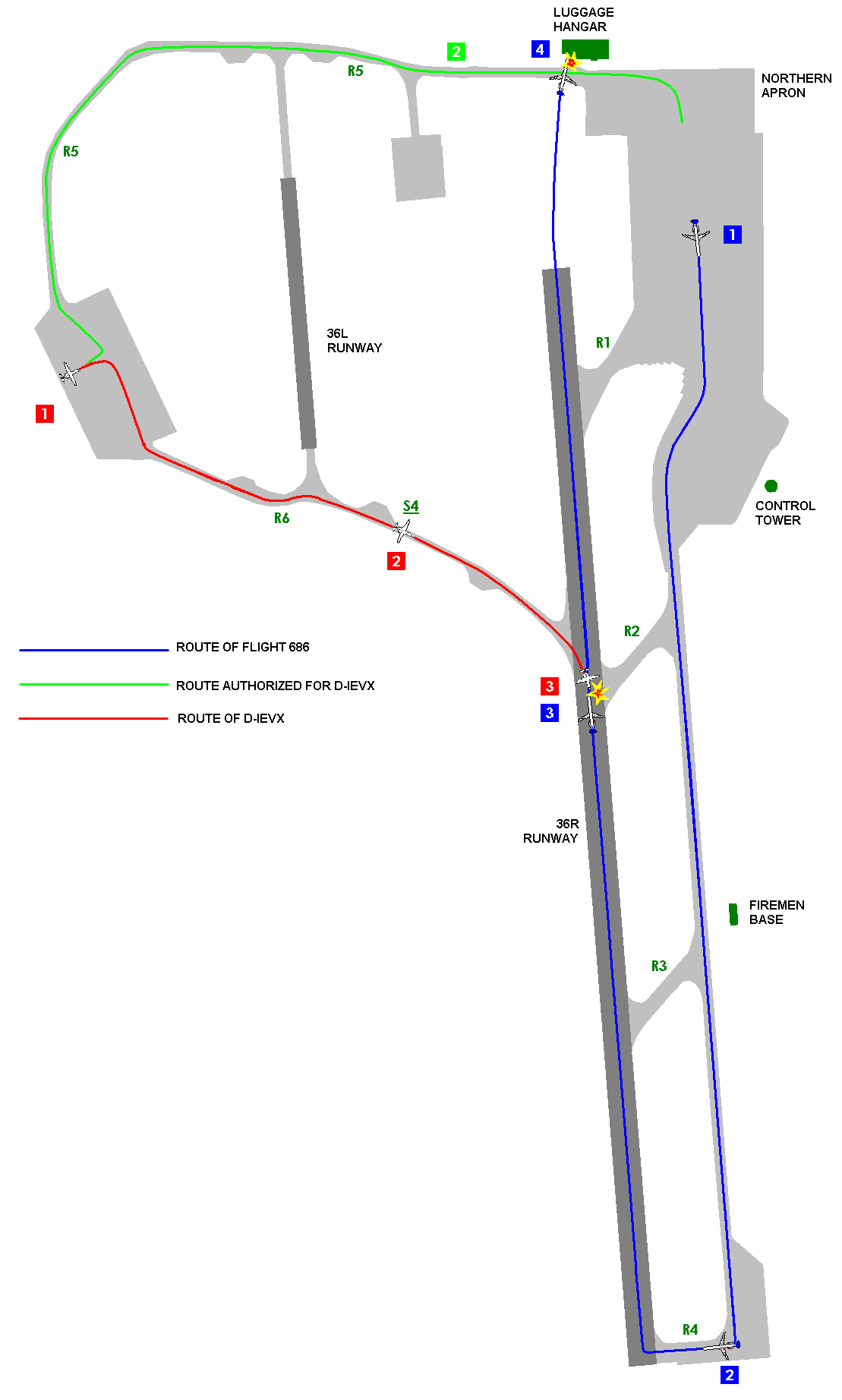
- Map of Linate Airport showing the routes of both aircraft involved

Accident
- Date: 8 October 2001
- Summary: Runway collision in poor visibility, inadequate taxiway signage, and disabled airport motion sensors
- Site: Linate Airport, Milan, Italy; 45°26′54″N 009°16′36″E
- Total fatalities: 118
- Total injuries: 4
- Total survivors: 0

First aircraft
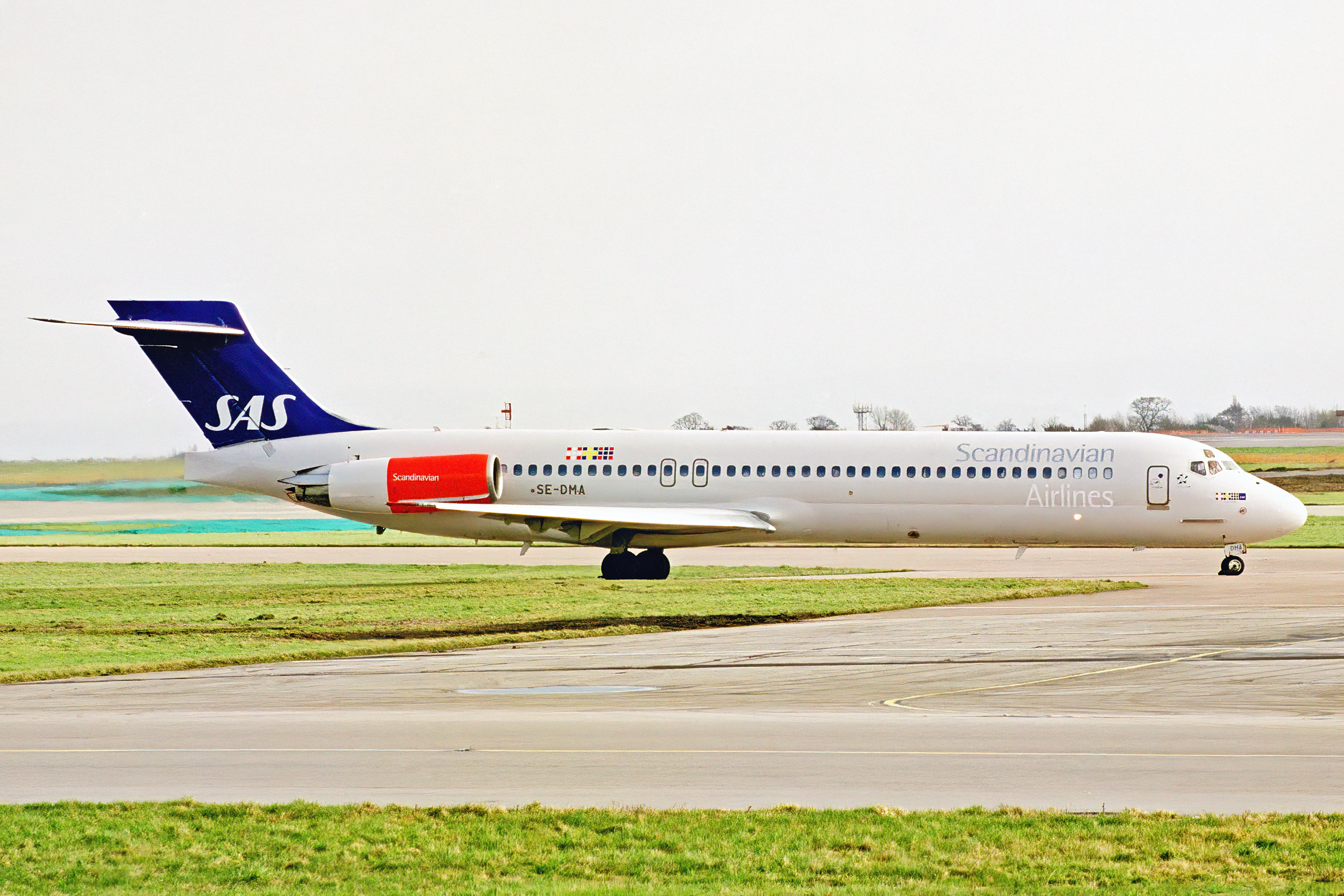
- SE-DMA, the McDonnell Douglas MD-87 involved in the collision, seen in 1999
- Type: McDonnell Douglas MD-87
- Name: Lage Viking
- Operator: Scandinavian Airlines System
- IATA flight No.: SK686
- ICAO flight No.: SAS686
- Call sign: SCANDINAVIAN 686
- Registration: SE-DMA
- Flight origin: Linate Airport; Milan, Italy
- Destination: Copenhagen Airport; Copenhagen, Denmark
- Occupants: 110
- Passengers: 104
- Crew: 6
- Fatalities: 110
- Survivors: 0

Second aircraft
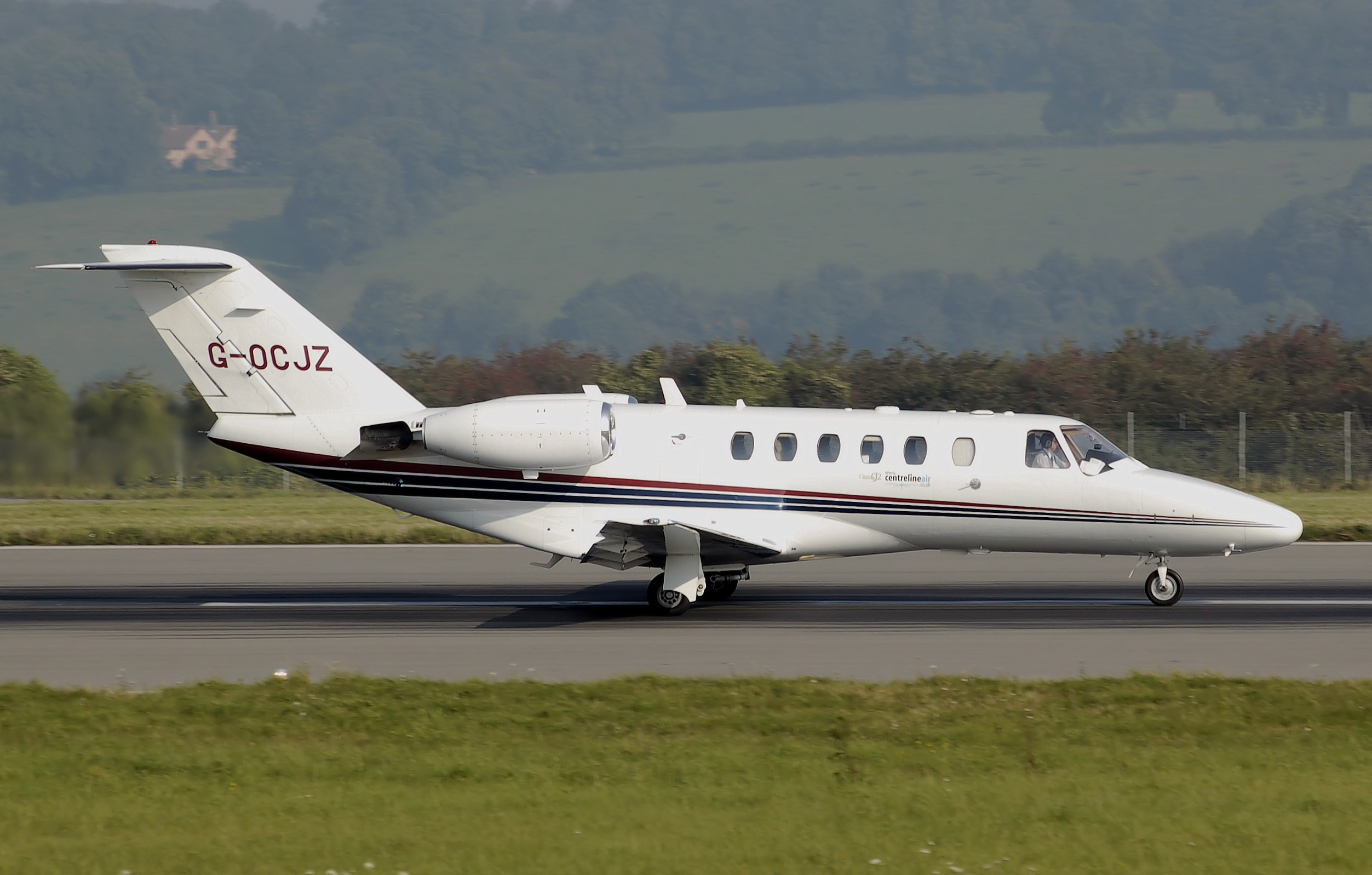
- A Cessna Citation CJ2, similar to the one involved in the collision
- Type: Cessna Citation CJ2
- Operator: Air Evex
- Call sign: DELTA INDIA ECHO VICTOR X-RAY
- Registration: D-IEVX
- Flight origin: Linate Airport; Milan, Italy
- Destination: Le Bourget Airport; Paris, France
- Occupants: 4
- Passengers: 2
- Crew: 2
- Fatalities: 4
- Survivors: 0

Ground casualties
- Ground fatalities: 4
- Ground injuries: 4

Scandinavian Airlines System Flight 686, a McDonnell Douglas MD-87 airliner carrying 110 people bound for Copenhagen, Denmark, collided on take-off with a Cessna Citation CJ2 business jet carrying four people bound for Paris, France, on 8 October 2001 at Linate Airport in Milan, Italy. All 114 people on both aircraft were killed, as well as four people on the ground.

The subsequent investigation determined that the collision was caused by several nonfunctioning and nonconforming safety systems, standards, and procedures at the airport. It remains the deadliest accident in Italian aviation history.

== Aircraft and crew ==
The collision involved two airlines; SAS and Air Evex. The larger of the two aircraft was a McDonnell-Douglas MD-87. The cockpit crew consisted of Captain Joakim Gustafsson and First Officer Anders Hyllander, both aged 36. Gustafsson had been hired by SAS in 1990 and had more than 5,800 hours of flight time. He had logged approximately 230 hours in the MD-87. Hyllander was hired by the airline in 1997. At the time of the accident, he had more than 4,300 total flying hours. He was more experienced in the aircraft type than his captain, having logged 2,000 hours of flight time in the MD-87. The four cabin crew consisted of Purser Lise Lotte Anderson (57) with 30 years' service at SAS, Flight Attendants Olaf Jakobsson (49) with 29 years' service, Eiler Danielson (27) with two years' service, and Janne Penttinen (30) with one year's service.

The second aircraft was a Cessna Citation 525-A. There were two German pilots aboard. The captain, 36-year-old Horst Königsmann, had approximately 5,000 total flight hours logged, of which roughly 2,400 were accumulated in the Citation. The first officer, 64-year-old Martin Schneider, had approximately 12,000 hours of flight experience, of which 2,000 hours were in the Citation. One of the passengers was Luca Fossati, chairman of Star – Stabilimento Alimentare S.p.A. and owner of the Citation.

== Accident ==
The accident occurred in thick fog, with visibility reduced to less than 200 metres (660 ft). The Cessna Citation was instructed to taxi from the western apron along the northern taxiway (taxiway R5), and then via the northern apron to the main taxiway which runs parallel to Runway 36R, a route that would have kept it clear of 36R. Instead, the pilot taxied along the southern taxi route (taxiway R6), crossing Runway 36R towards the main taxiway which lay beyond it (see diagram).

At 08:09:28, the MD-87 was given clearance by a different controller to take off from Runway 36R. Fifty-three seconds later, the MD-87 aircraft, travelling at about 150 knots (280 km/h; 170 mph), collided with the Cessna. The right main landing gear and right engine of the MD-87 were detached on impact. The pilots advanced the throttles and were able to get airborne, reaching an approximate altitude of 35 feet and a maximum airspeed of 166 knots. They then reduced engine power after noticing a loss of thrust due to debris ingestion, and the aircraft made contact with the runway twelve seconds after becoming airborne. Gustafsson applied thrust reverser and brakes and tried to guide the plane through its control surfaces, but the aircraft exited the runway and collided with a luggage hangar located near the runway's end, at a speed of approximately 136 knots (252 km/h; 157 mph). The crash and subsequent fire killed all occupants of the MD-87. In addition, four Italian ground personnel in the hangar were killed and four more were injured.

All occupants of the MD-87 were killed by blunt trauma from the impact with the hangar. Fifty-four of them, mainly in the back of the aircraft, suffered severe burns, requiring their bodies to be identified using forensic dentistry or DNA records.

== Causes ==
The accident occurred less than a month after the September 11 attacks and the day after the U.S. invasion of Afghanistan began, but the Italian government was quick to rule out a terrorist attack as the cause. This was subsequently confirmed by the investigations that followed.

The accident was investigated by the National Agency for the Safety of Flight (ANSV). The ANSV's final report was published on 20 January 2004 and concluded that the "immediate cause" of the accident was the incursion of the Cessna aircraft onto the active runway. However, the ANSV stopped short of placing the blame entirely on the Cessna pilots, who had become lost in the fog. Their report identified deficiencies in the airport layout and procedures.

Linate Airport was operating without a functioning ground radar system at the time, despite having had a new system approved on 30 March 1995. The previous system had been decommissioned on 29 November 1999, but the replacement had not been fully installed. The new system came online a few months later. Guidance signs along the taxiways were obscured, or badly worn, and were later found not to meet regulations. After the pilots mistakenly turned onto the R6 taxiway that led to the runway, there were no signs by which they could recognize where they were. When they stopped at a taxiway stop-marking, and correctly reported its identifier, S4, the ground controller disregarded this identification because it was not on his maps and was unknown to him. Motion sensing runway incursion alarms were present, but had been deactivated to prevent false alarms from ground vehicles or animals. The ground controller's verbal directions used terminology to designate aprons, taxiways, and runways, which did not match their on-the-ground signage and labels. Lastly, neither pilot of the Cessna was certified for landings with visibility less than 500 metres (1,600 ft), but had landed at the airport an hour before the disaster with a visibility reported by air traffic control of 100 metres (330 ft).

== Aftermath ==
On 16 April 2004, a Milan court found four people guilty for the disaster. Airport director Vincenzo Fusco and air-traffic controller Paolo Zacchetti were both sentenced to eight years in prison. Francesco Federico, former head of the airport, and Sandro Gualano, former head of the air traffic control agency, received sentences of six-and-a-half years. The pardon law issued by the Italian Parliament on 29 July 2006 reduced all convictions by three years. On 7 July 2006, Fusco and Federico were acquitted by the Milan Appeals Court. The controller Zacchetti's sentence was reduced to three years. In addition three more people were sentenced for multiple manslaughter and negligent disaster: former ENAV director general Fabio Marzocca to four years and four months, and former SEA airports agency officials Antonio Cavanna and Lorenzo Grecchi each to three years and three months. On 20 February 2008 the Supreme Court of Cassation upheld the acquittal of Fusco and Federico and confirmed five convictions. (Initially, in late 2002, eleven officials and functionaries had been charged with manslaughter.)

The initial eight-year sentence for Zacchetti prompted outrage among air traffic controllers. His sentence has been questioned in aviation safety law commentary.

== Victims ==
Nationality	SAS 686		Cessna		Ground	Total
Nationality	Passengers	Crew	Passengers	Crew	Ground	Total
Denmark	16	3	0	0	0	19
Finland	6	0	0	0	0	6
Germany	0	0	0	2	0	2
Italy	58	0	2	0	4	64
Norway	3	0	0	0	0	3
Romania	1	0	0	0	0	1
South Africa	1	0	0	0	0	1
Sweden	17	3	0	0	0	20
United Kingdom	2*	0	0	0	0	2
Total	104	6	2	2	4	118
* One passenger listed as a Briton by SAS held United Kingdom and United States citizenships.

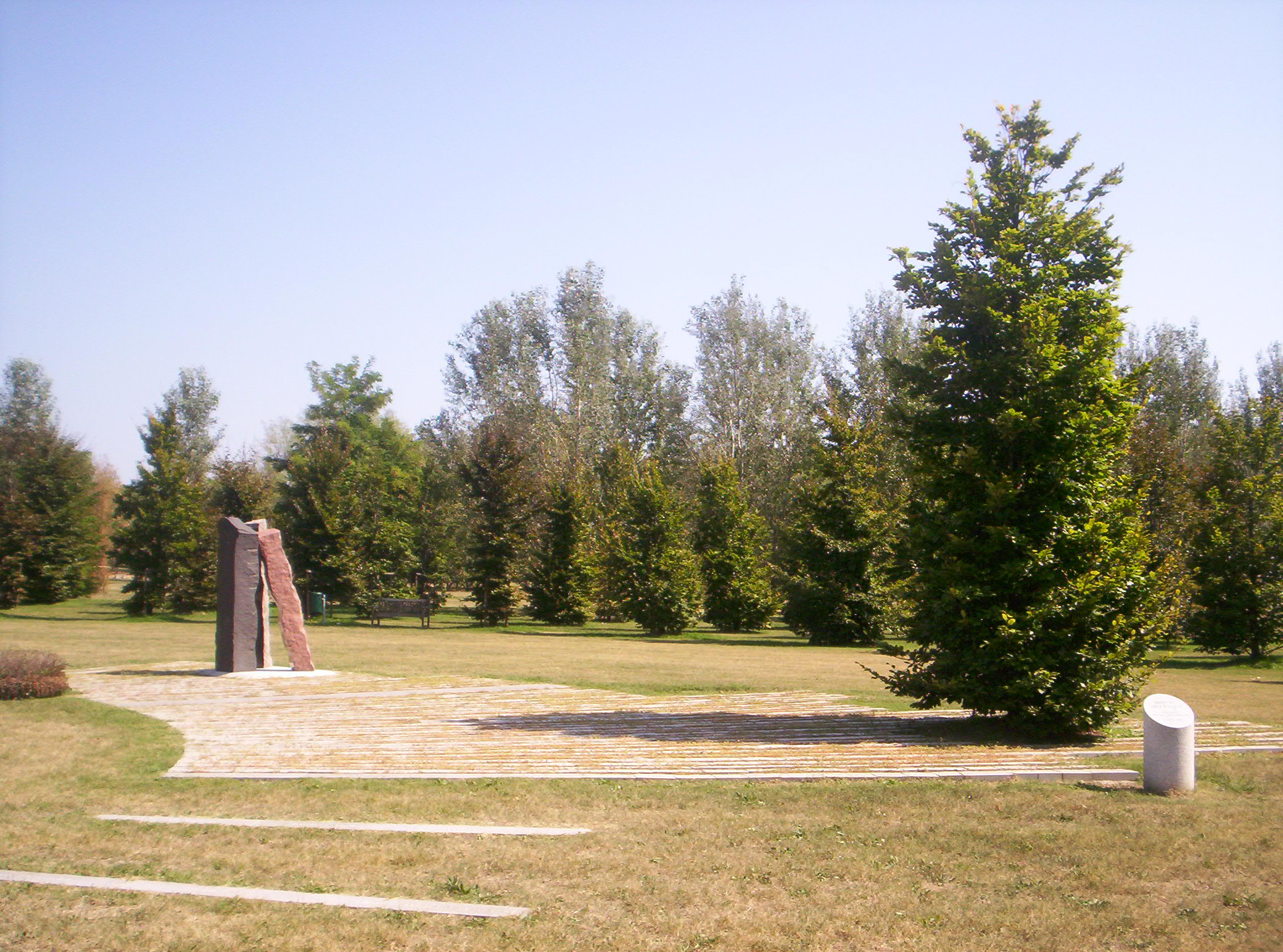
The memorial sculpture Infinity Pain

Victims of the crash included nationals of nine different countries. Most of the victims were Italian and Scandinavian.

Four memorial services were held in honour of the SAS MD-87 victims. On 12 October 2001, three separate ceremonies were held, with one in Denmark, one in Norway, and one in Sweden. On 13 October, a fourth ceremony was held in Italy.

In March 2002, a forest containing 118 beech trees called Beech Forest (Italian: Bosco dei Faggi) was inaugurated as a memorial to the victims in the Forlanini Park near the airport. A sculpture by the Swedish artist Christer Bording donated by SAS, called Infinity Pain, was placed in the centre of the forest.

The disaster devastated the Swedish go-kart community as some of the country's most promising young drivers were on the flight after attending an event in Lonato. After the disaster, the Swedish national motorsports club started a memorial fund together with some of the relatives. The fund awards annual stipends to promising Swedish youth in go-kart.

== Dramatization ==
In 2012 the accident was featured on the 11th season of the Discovery Channel Canada / National Geographic TV series Mayday, in an episode entitled "The Invisible Plane". The episode featured interviews with accident investigators, and a dramatization of the crash and investigation.

== See also ==
- Other runway incursions that occurred in fog:
  - Tenerife airport disaster
  - 1983 Madrid Airport runway collision
  - 1983 Anchorage runway collision
  - 1990 Wayne County Airport runway collision
