= 1990 Detroit Metropolitan Airport runway collision =

1990 runway collision in Michigan

1990 Detroit Metropolitan Airport runway collision Northwest Airlines Flight 1482 · Northwest Airlines Flight 299
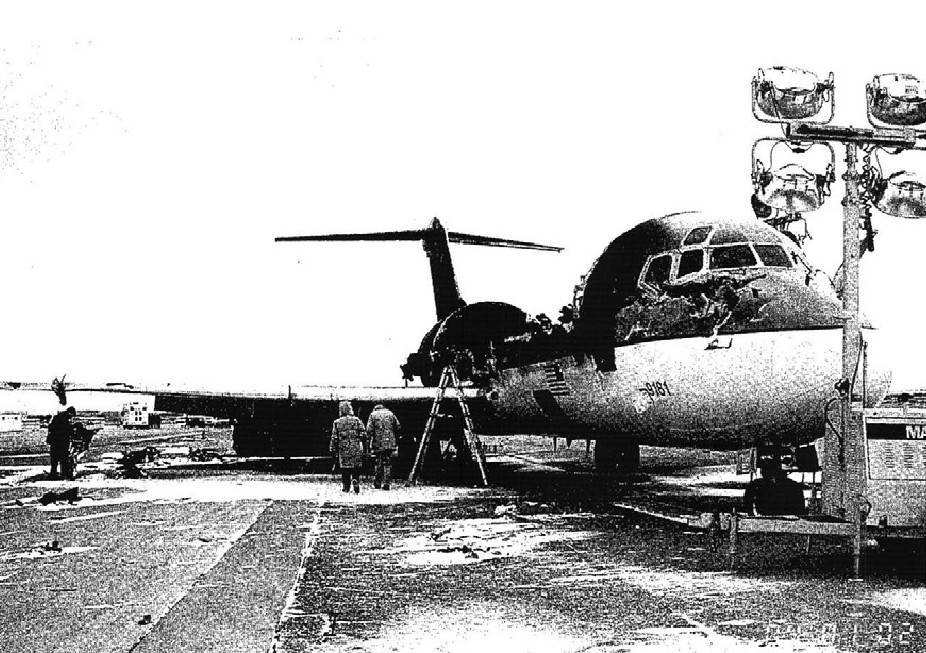
- Wreckage of Flight 1482

Accident
- Date: December 3, 1990
- Summary: Runway collision in fog due to pilot and ATC error, in addition to poor taxiway conditions
- Site: Detroit Metropolitan Wayne County Airport, Michigan; 42°12.9′N 83°20.9′W
- Total fatalities: 8
- Total injuries: 10
- Total survivors: 190

First aircraft
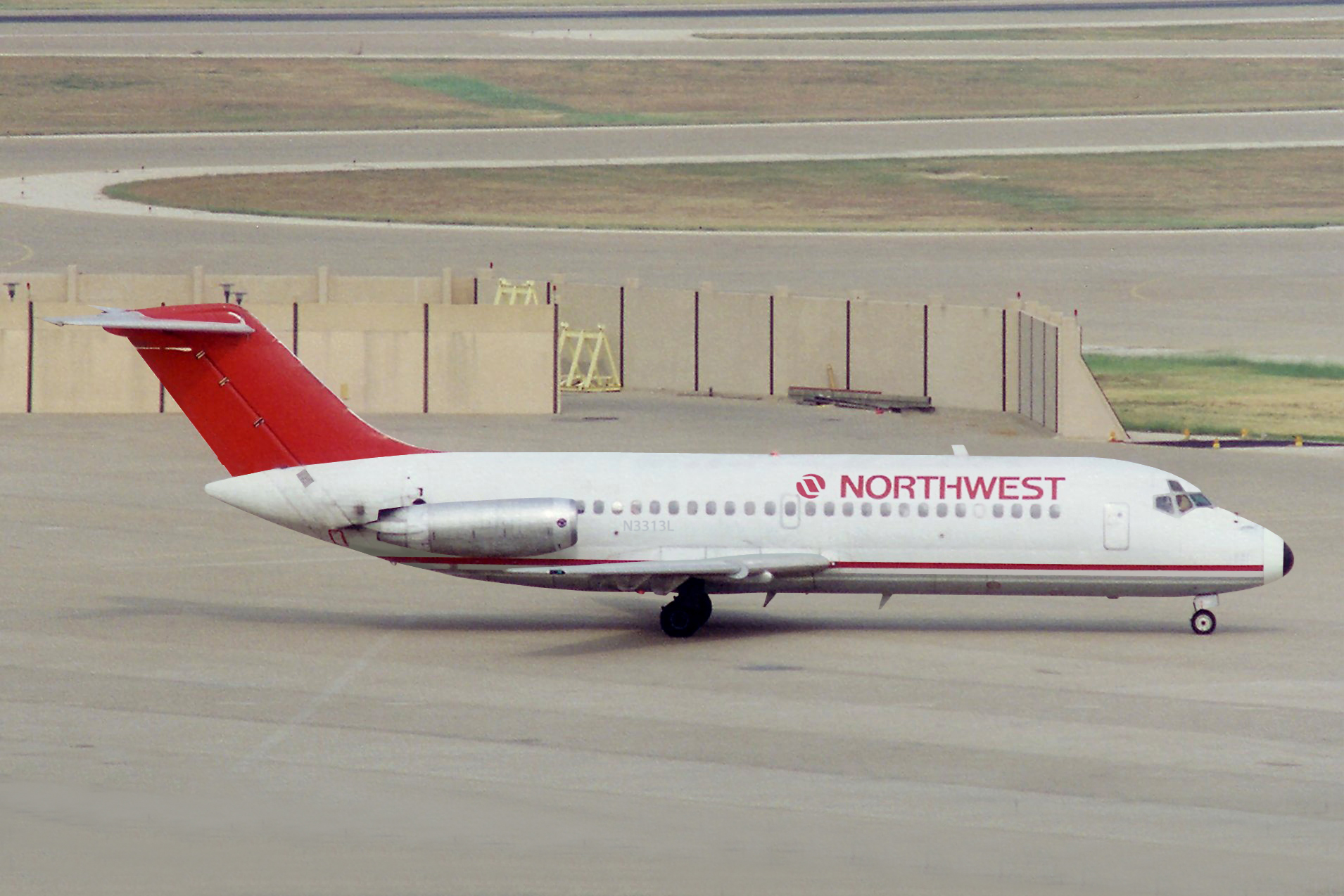
- N3313L, the McDonnell Douglas DC-9-14 involved in the collision, seen in October 1990 with a previous livery
- Type: McDonnell Douglas DC-9-14
- Operator: Northwest Airlines
- IATA flight No.: NW1482
- ICAO flight No.: NWA1482
- Call sign: NORTHWEST 1482
- Registration: N3313L
- Flight origin: Detroit Metropolitan Wayne County Airport, Michigan
- Destination: Pittsburgh International Airport
- Occupants: 44
- Passengers: 40
- Crew: 4
- Fatalities: 8
- Injuries: 10
- Survivors: 36

Second aircraft
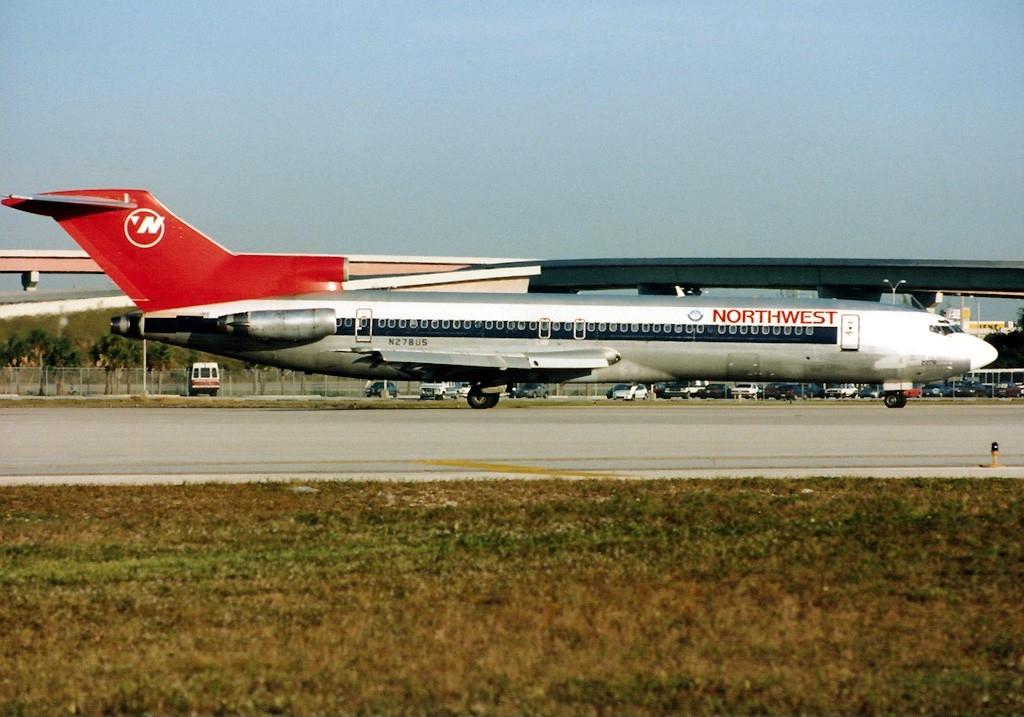
- N278US, the Boeing 727-251-Adv involved in the collision, seen in 1993 after being repaired
- Type: Boeing 727-251-Adv
- Operator: Northwest Airlines
- IATA flight No.: NW299
- ICAO flight No.: NWA299
- Call sign: NORTHWEST 299
- Registration: N278US
- Flight origin: Detroit Metropolitan Wayne County Airport, Michigan
- Destination: Memphis International Airport, Tennessee
- Occupants: 154
- Passengers: 146
- Crew: 8
- Fatalities: 0
- Survivors: 154

On December 3, 1990, two Northwest Airlines jetliners collided at Detroit Metropolitan Wayne County Airport. Flight 1482, a scheduled Douglas DC-9-14 operating from Detroit to Pittsburgh International Airport, taxied by mistake onto an active runway in dense fog and was hit by a departing Boeing 727 operating as Flight 299 to Memphis International Airport. One member of the crew and seven passengers of the DC-9 were killed.

== Aircraft and crew ==
The DC-9 operating Flight 1482, registered as N3313L, was built in 1966 and had a total of 62,253 operating hours. The plane was delivered new to Delta, which sold it to Southern Airways in 1973. It became part of Northwest's fleet after the 1986 acquisition of Southern's successor, Republic Airlines. It was declared a total loss and scrapped following this accident. The crew consisted of Captain William Lovelace (52), who had logged 23,000 flight hours with 4,000 hours in the DC-9, and First Officer James Schifferns (43), who had logged 4,685 flight hours with 185 hours in the DC-9.

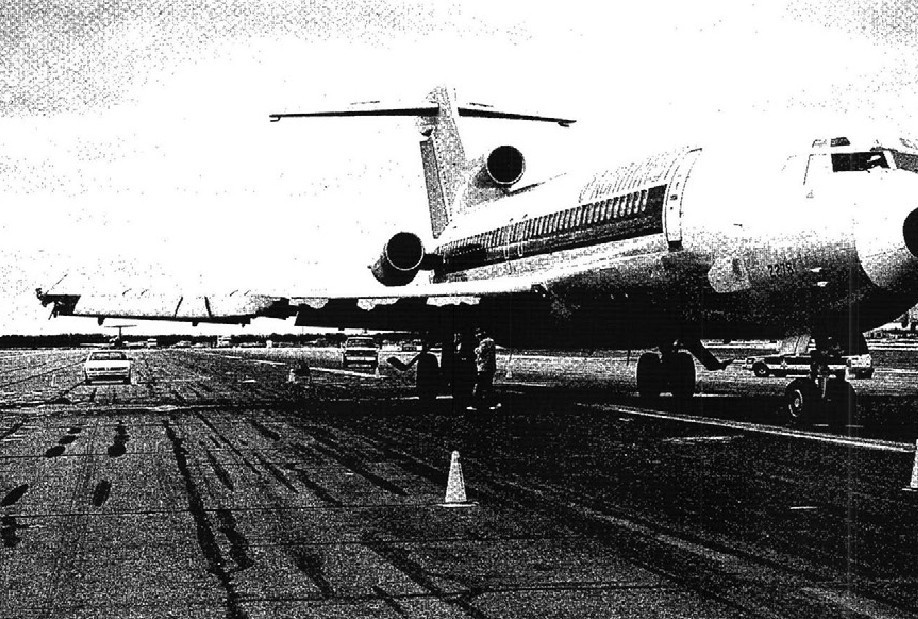
Damage to Flight 299

The Boeing 727 operating Flight 299 was registered N278US and had been delivered to Northwest in 1975. It had 37,310 operating hours. The aircraft was repaired and continued in service for Northwest until 1995. N278US was flown by Kitty Hawk Aircargo before being scrapped in 2011. The crew consisted of Captain Robert Ouellette (42), who had logged 10,400 flight hours with 5,400 hours on the 727, First Officer William Hagedorn (37), who had logged 5,400 flight hours with 2,350 hours on the 727, and Flight Engineer Darren Owen (31), who had logged 3,300 flight hours with 900 hours on the 727.

== Accident ==
Northwest Airlines Flight 1482, a Douglas DC-9-14, was cleared from the gate toward Runway 03C, but it missed turning onto Taxiway Oscar 6 and instead entered the outer taxiway. To correct the error, the crew was instructed to turn right onto Taxiway X-ray, but they instead turned onto the active runway, 03C. They realized the mistake and contacted air traffic control, which instructed them to leave the runway immediately.

Five seconds later (at 13:45 EST), the crew saw the Boeing 727, Northwest Flight 299 to Memphis, heading toward them on its takeoff roll. The 727's wing cut through the right side of the DC-9's fuselage just below the windows, then continued aft, finally cutting off the DC-9's right side (#2) engine. The DC-9 caught fire and was destroyed.

The captain of the DC-9 escaped from the aircraft through the left sliding window. Eighteen people escaped the plane from the left overwing exit, 13 people escaped through the left main boarding door and four people jumped from the right service door. The rear jumpseat flight attendant and a passenger died from smoke inhalation after being unable to release the tailcone emergency exit due to a mechanical fault.

Of the surviving passengers, the NTSB stated that 10 received serious injuries and 23 received minor or no injuries. The three surviving crew members received minor or no injuries. The NTSB added that it did not receive medical records for three passengers who were admitted to a burn center; for purposes of the report, the NTSB labeled their injuries as serious. The NTSB also did not receive medical records for the copilot and six passengers who were treated and released from area hospitals; for the purposes of the report, the NTSB assumed that they had received minor injuries.

After the collision, the 727 flight crew immediately initiated a rejected takeoff and was able to stop the aircraft safely on the remaining runway. The captain then shut down all three engines and ascertained that no one on board had been injured and that the aircraft was only lightly damaged. Deciding that no immediate danger existed, he did not order an emergency evacuation, and the passengers and crew deplaned using the rear airstair after the aircraft was sprayed with fire retardant foam as a precaution. The 727 sustained a damaged wing and was later repaired.

== Investigation ==
The accident was investigated by the National Transportation Safety Board, which determined the probable cause of the accident to be:

a lack of proper crew coordination, including a virtual reversal of roles by the DC-9 pilots, which led to their failure to stop taxiing their airplane and alert the ground controller of their positional uncertainty promptly before and after intruding onto the active runway.

Contributing to the cause of the accident were (1) deficiencies in the air traffic control services provided by the Detroit tower, including failure of the ground controller to take timely action to alert the local controller to the possible runway incursion, inadequate visibility observations, failure to use progressive taxi instructions in low-visibility conditions, and issuance of inappropriate and confusing taxi instructions compounded by inadequate backup supervision for the level of experience of the staff on duty; (2) deficiencies in the surface markings, signage, and lighting at the airport and the failure of Federal Aviation Administration surveillance to detect or correct any of these deficiencies; and (3) failure of Northwest Airlines, Inc., to provide adequate cockpit resource management training to their line aircrews.

Contributing to the fatalities in the accident was the inoperability of the DC-9 internal tail cone release mechanism. Contributing to the number and severity of injuries was the failure of the crew of the DC-9 to properly execute the passenger evacuation.

== In popular culture ==
The accident is featured in the fourth episode of Season 20 of Mayday, also known as Air Crash Investigation. The episode is titled "Taxiway Turmoil".

== See also ==
- Tenerife airport disaster – 1977 runway incursion in dense fog involving two Boeing 747s, which is the deadliest accident in aviation history
- 1983 Madrid Airport runway collision – 1983 fatal takeoff accident also involving a DC-9 taxiing incorrectly in dense fog and being struck by a 727 taking off
- 2001 Linate Airport runway collision - 2001 fatal accident in which a Cessna Citation CJ2 taxied in front of a McDonnell Douglas MD-87 taking off in dense fog
- 1983 Anchorage runway collision - a nonfatal accident in which a McDonnell Douglas DC-10 attempted to take off from partway down a runway occupied by a Piper PA-31 in dense fog
