= 1983 Madrid Airport runway collision =

Runway collision in 1983

1983 Madrid Airport runway collision Iberia Flight 350 · Aviaco Flight 134
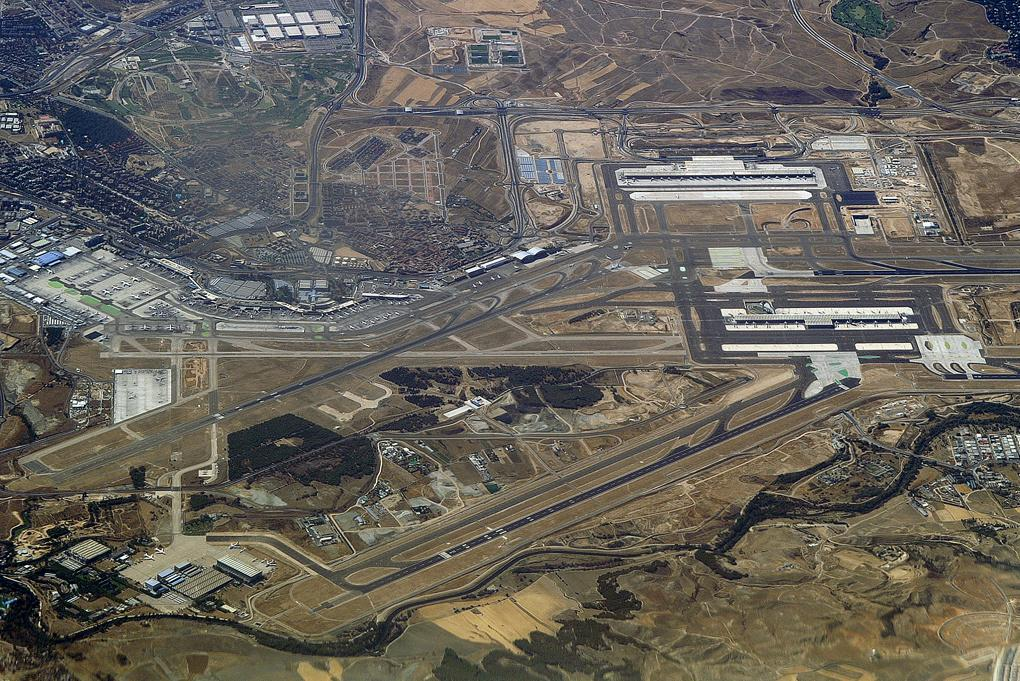
- Overview of Madrid–Barajas Airport, the site of the disaster, 22 years after the incident.

Accident
- Date: 7 December 1983
- Summary: Runway incursion due to inadequate signs and markings
- Site: Madrid–Barajas Airport, Madrid, Spain; 40°28′11″N 3°33′46″W
- Total fatalities: 93
- Total injuries: 30
- Total survivors: 42

First aircraft
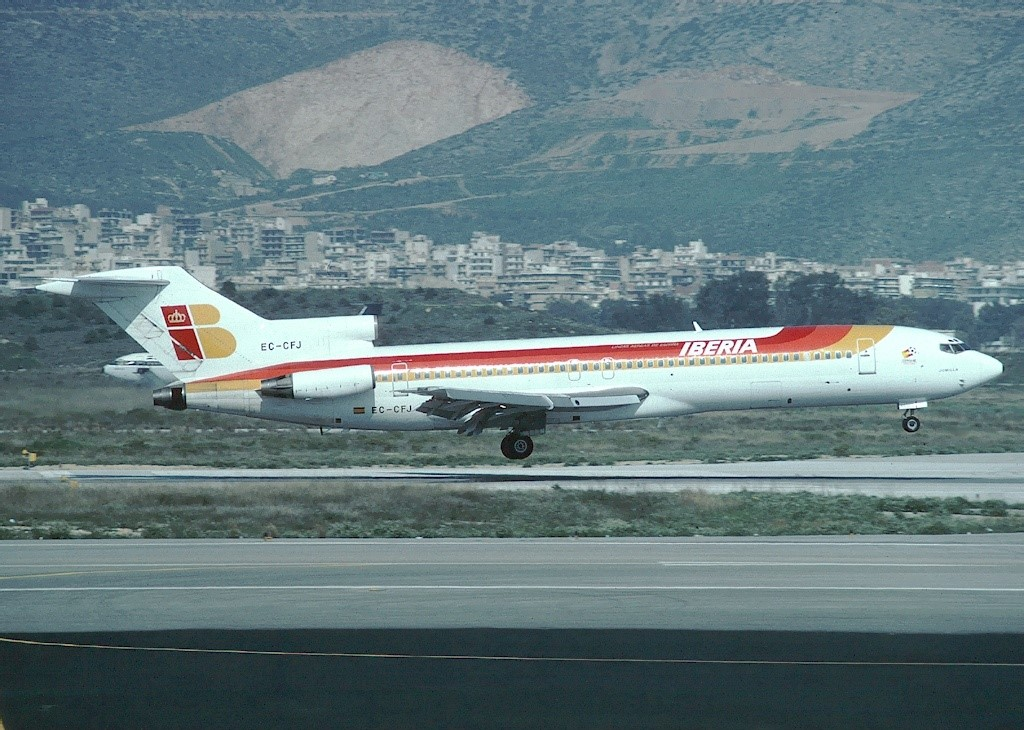
- EC-CFJ, the Boeing 727 involved in the collision, seen in 1982
- Type: Boeing 727-256
- Name: Jumilla
- Operator: Iberia
- IATA flight No.: IB350
- ICAO flight No.: IBE350
- Call sign: IBERIA 350
- Registration: EC-CFJ
- Flight origin: Madrid–Barajas Airport, Madrid, Spain
- Destination: Fiumicino Airport, Rome, Italy
- Occupants: 93
- Passengers: 84
- Crew: 9
- Fatalities: 51
- Injuries: 30
- Survivors: 42

Second aircraft
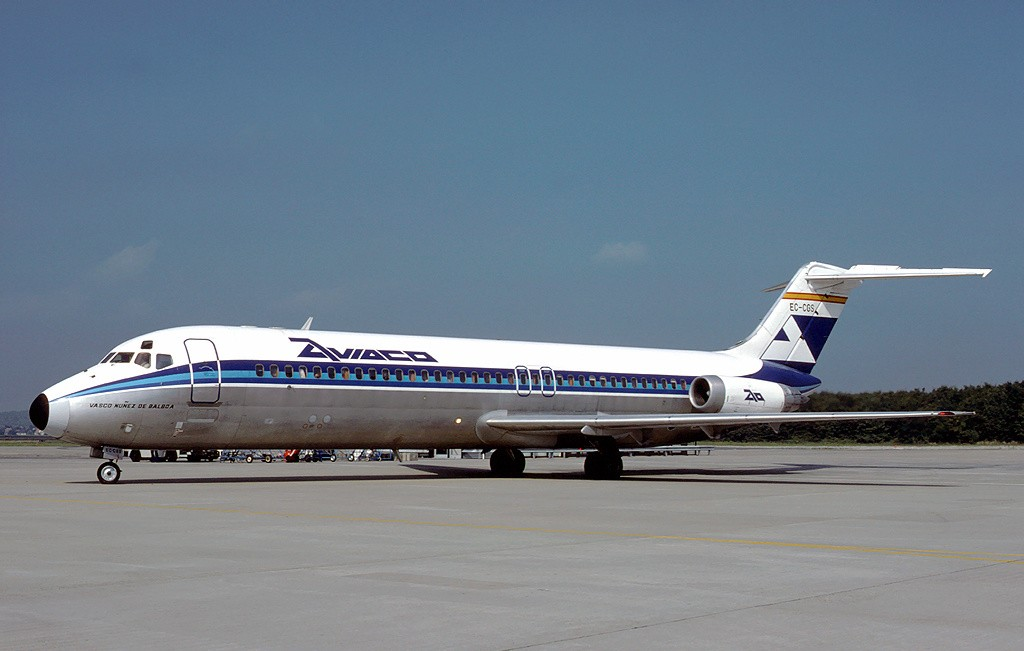
- EC-CGS, the DC-9 involved in the collision, seen in 1980
- Type: McDonnell Douglas DC-9-32
- Name: Vasco Núñez de Balboa
- Operator: Aviaco
- IATA flight No.: AO134
- ICAO flight No.: AYC134
- Call sign: AVIACO 134
- Registration: EC-CGS
- Flight origin: Madrid–Barajas Airport, Madrid, Spain
- Destination: Santander Airport, Santander, Spain
- Occupants: 42
- Passengers: 37
- Crew: 5
- Fatalities: 42
- Survivors: 0

The 1983 Madrid Airport runway collision occurred on 7 December 1983 when a departing Iberia Boeing 727 struck an Aviaco McDonnell Douglas DC-9 at Madrid-Barajas Airport, causing the deaths of 93 passengers and crew. The cause of the collision was blamed on inadequate signage and taxi markings. Among the victims were Mexican actress Fanny Cano, Spanish philosopher José María Cagigal (both aboard the Iberia 727), and South African pianist Marc Raubenheimer (aboard the Aviaco DC-9).

== Background ==
=== Aircraft ===
==== Flight 350 ====
The aircraft operating as Iberia Flight 350, manufactured by Boeing in 1974, was a 9-year-old Boeing 727-256 registered as EC-CFJ with serial number 20820 and line number 1019. It was equipped with three Pratt & Whitney JT8D-9 engines and logged a total of 21,525 total airframe hours in 19,936 takeoff and landing cycles.

==== Flight 134 ====
The aircraft operating as Aviaco Flight 134 was an 8-year-old McDonnell Douglas DC-9-32 registered as EC-CGS, manufactured by McDonnell Douglas in 1975, with serial number 47645 and line number 770. It was equipped with two Pratt & Whitney JT8D-9A engines and had logged a total of 20,078 airframe hours in 17,909 takeoff and landing cycles.

=== Crew ===
==== Flight 350 ====
In command was Captain Carlos Lopez Barranco, aged 43, who had 8,860 flight hours as a pilot, with 1,919 hours on the 727. His co-pilot was First Officer Juan José Ochoa, aged 41, with 3,474 flight hours, 2,840 of which were on the 727. They were accompanied by flight engineer Luis Luengo, 37, who had 7,211 flight hours of experience.

==== Flight 134 ====
In command was Captain Augusto Almoguera, aged 54, who had accumulated 13,442 flight hours of experience, 6,600 on the DC-9. Captain Almoguera knew Captain Lopez Barranco, who had been his instructor in air training courses at the Jerez de la Frontera Base. He was accompanied by the first officer and co-pilot José María Gibernau, 39, with 10,322 flight hours, 3,655 of which were on the DC-9.

== Accident ==
On 7 December 1983, a Boeing 727 of Iberia (Spain's state airline) registered EC-CFJ, operating Iberia Flight 350, a scheduled flight to Rome's Leonardo da Vinci–Fiumicino Airport, was cleared for take-off from Madrid-Barajas Airport's Runway 01 in conditions of thick fog. At the same time, a DC-9 of Aviaco registered EC-CGS, operating Aviaco Flight 134, was taxiing to the end of the same runway for take-off bound for Santander Airport. As the Boeing 727 rolled along the runway, the crew of the DC-9 accidentally made a wrong turn in the fog and taxied their aircraft onto the runway, into the path of the 727. The crew of the 727 saw the DC-9 and attempted to avoid the collision by rotating their aircraft for lift-off; however, the 727 had not reached flying speed and its rear fuselage struck the DC-9.

== Victims ==
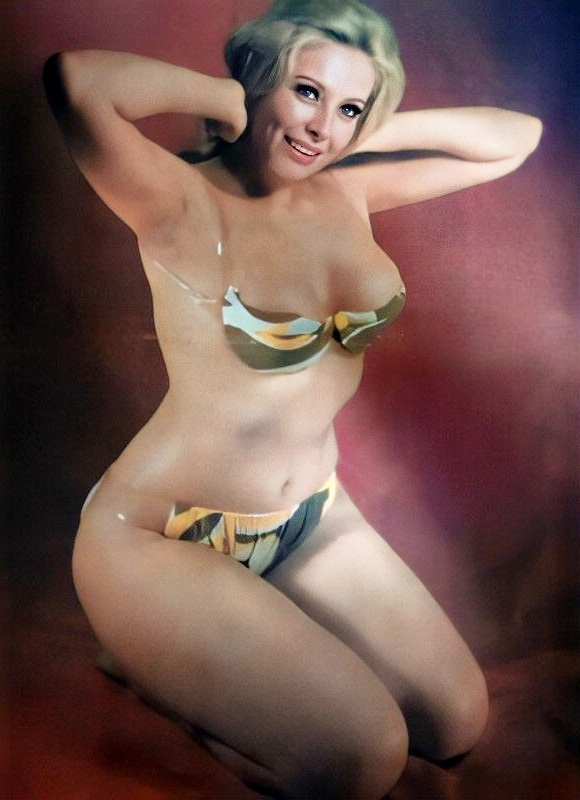
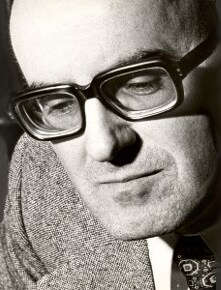
Mexican actress Fanny Cano and Spanish philosopher José María Cagigal were among the victims of the accident

Both aircraft caught fire and were destroyed; all 42 people on board the DC-9 were killed, while 51 (50 passengers, one crew member) of the 93 on board the Boeing 727 were killed. Notable fatalities from the disaster included Fanny Cano, José María Cagigal, and Marc Raubenheimer.

== Investigation ==
After the accident, an investigation was immediately started, which lasted more than a year. Investigators found that the DC-9 had inadvertently taxied onto the active runway due to poor visibility at the airport, as well as inadequate signs and markings, which led to the DC-9 entering the runway without clearance, unknowingly, while the Boeing 727 was attempting to take off.

== See also ==
- 1990 Wayne County Airport runway collision, another fatal runway incursion, involving the same type of aircraft, under almost identical circumstances.
- 1983 Anchorage runway collision, another December 1983 runway collision involving incorrect taxiing in dense fog.
- 2001 Linate Airport runway collision, a runway collision in Italy killing 118 people and also involving incorrect taxiing in dense fog.
- Tenerife airport disaster, another collision of two airliners at a Spanish airport in fog and the worst aircraft accident in history in terms of loss-of-life, with 583 lives lost.
