= 1990 in aviation =

This is a list of aviation-related events from 1990.

== Events ==
- Pan American World Airways and Trans World Airlines, both in financial difficulty, transfer their coveted landing rights at London Heathrow Airport to American Airlines and United Airlines.

=== January ===
- January 11 – The United States Department of Defense awards Bell Helicopter a $US 123 million development contract for the V-22 Osprey.
- January 20 – North American Airlines began operations.
- January 25 – Avianca Flight 052, a Boeing 707-321B, runs out of fuel and crashes at Cove Neck, Long Island, New York, killing 73 of the 158 people on board.
- January 26 – The first of two new Air Force Ones, VIP variants of the Boeing 747-200 for the use of the President of the United States and his staff, are delivered.

=== February ===
- The Government of Vietnam resubordinates Vietnam′s national civil aviation authority, the Civil Aviation Administration of Vietnam, from the Ministry of Defense to the Ministry of Transport.
- February 14 – Indian Airlines Flight 605, an Airbus A320-321, crashes on a golf course on approach to Bangalore, India, killing 92 of the 146 people on board and injuring all 54 survivors.
- February 26 – Eurofly begins flight operations.

=== March ===
- March 6 – The last flight of the SR-71 Blackbird takes place, when Lieutenant Colonels Ed Yielding (pilot) and Joseph Vida (reconnaissance systems officer) fly U.S. Air Force SR-71A serial number 61-17972 from Palmdale, California, to Washington Dulles International Airport in Virginia, setting a Los Angeles, California-to-Washington, D.C. world record time of 1 hour 4 minutes 20 seconds at an average speed of 2,124 mph (3,418 km/h). The aircraft is delivered to the Smithsonian Institution's National Air and Space Museum to be put on display.
- March 27 – TV Martí, a United States Government television station employing aircraft to broadcast its signal into Cuba, goes on the air for the first time, using an aerostat – nicknamed "Fat Albert" by people in the area – tethered over Cudjoe Key, Florida, at an altitude of 10,000 feet (3,000 meters). After Hurricane Dennis destroys "Fat Albert" in 2005, the broadcasting effort uses fixed-wing aircraft until May 2013, when budget cuts ground the last aircraft, Aero Martí.
- March 29 – The Transportation Safety Board of Canada is formed. It replaces the Canadian Aviation Safety Board.

=== April ===
- April 9 – Atlantic Southeast Airlines Flight 2254, an Embraer 120RT Brasília with seven people on board, and a Civil Air Patrol Cessna 172 collide in mid-air over Gadsden, Alabama. The Cessna crashes in a field, killing both its occupants; the Embraer, with its right horizontal stabilizer torn off, makes an emergency landing at Northeast Alabama Regional Airport in Gadsden without injury to anyone on board.
- April 12 – Widerøe Flight 839, a de Havilland Canada DHC-6-300 Twin Otter, crashes into the Norwegian Sea just after takeoff from Værøy Airport in Værøy Municipality, Norway, when strong winds crack its tail rudder and tailplane, rendering it uncontrollable. All five people on board die. Værøy Airport is closed after the accident due to the danger posed by bad weather and replaced by Værøy Heliport farther to the south.
- April 21 – Aeritalia joins the Airbus consortium as a partner.

=== May ===
- May 11 – The center wing fuel tank of Philippine Airlines Flight 143, a Boeing 737-300 with 120 people on board, explodes as the aircraft taxis before takeoff at Ninoy Aquino International Airport in Manila, the Philippines, killing eight of the 120 people on board. The plane catches fire, and the 112 survivors are evacuated.

=== June ===
- June 10 – A British Airways BAC One-Eleven operating as Flight 5390 bound from Birmingham, England, to Málaga, Spain, with 87 people on board has a windshield blow out over Didcot, England, slightly injuring a flight attendant and severely injuring the captain, Tim Lancaster, who is sucked halfway out of the aircraft and then wedged against the windshield frame. While flight stewards hold on to him to prevent him from being sucked entirely out of the aircraft, the first officer lands the plane at Southampton Airport in England, and the captain survives his ordeal.
- June 22 – Bombardier purchases Learjet for $US 75.85 million

=== July ===
- July 1 – East Germany's national airline, Interflug, becomes a member of the International Air Transport Association.
- July 7 – The Portuguese regional airline Portugália begins flight operations with a domestic flight in Portugal from Lisbon to Porto. Later in the day it operates a flight from Lisbon to Faro, Portugal.
- July 24 – After over 29 years of accident-free flights logging over 281,000 flying hours since it began on February 3, 1961, the United States Air Force ends continuous airborne alert missions under Operation Looking Glass, although Looking Glass aircraft remain on continuous, 24-hour ground or airborne alert.

=== August ===
- August 2–4 – Iraq invades and occupies Kuwait. At the time, the United States Navy aircraft carrier USS Independence (CV-62) is in the northern Arabian Sea; during the month, additional aircraft carriers will deploy to within striking range of Iraq and Kuwait, with USS Dwight D. Eisenhower (CVN-69) deploying to the eastern Mediterranean Sea and then the Red Sea, and USS Saratoga (CV-60) departing Norfolk, Virginia, to deploy to the Red Sea. USS John F. Kennedy (CV-67) relieves "Dwight D. Eisenhower" in the Red Sea in mid-August. Invading Iraqi forces capture British Airways Flight 149, a Boeing 747-136 with 385 people on board, while it is on the ground at Kuwait International Airport near Kuwait City, Kuwait. The Iraqi detain the passengers and crew for use as "human shields" around important targets in Iraq; all survive and the Iraqis eventually release them before the onset of Coalition attacks against Iraq in January 1991. The aircraft is looted and then destroyed. Iraqi government steals a number of Kuwaiti Airways planes and Kuwait Aircraft and takes them back to Iraq.
- August 6 – The United States issues its first orders deploying military forces in response to the Iraqi invasion of Kuwait, sending two squadrons of United States Air Force F-15 Eagle fighters to the Persian Gulf region and several U.S. Air Force B-52 Stratofortress bombers from the continental United States to Diego Garcia in the Indian Ocean.
- August 27 – Blues guitarist Stevie Ray Vaughan and all four other people on board die in the crash of a Bell 206B Jet Ranger helicopter near East Troy, Wisconsin.

=== September ===
- L'Express Airlines inaugurates its first service outside of Louisiana, beginning flights to William P. Hobby Airport in Houston, Texas; Birmingham International Airport in Birmingham, Alabama; and Mobile Regional Airport in Mobile, Alabama.
- Lauda Air Italy is established. It will begin flight operations in 1993.
- September 1 – The Government of New Zealand establishes New Zealand's Transport Accident Investigation Commission. Initially responsible only for the investigation of aviation accidents and incidents, in will take on the additional responsibilities of investigating railway accidents in 1992 and marine accidents in 1995.
- September 11 - a Faucett Perú 727 on a repositioning flight disappears over the Pacific Ocean with 16 people on board after they told the air traffic controller that they were going to ditch. No wreckage is ever found.
- September 27 – United Air Lines is the first airline to introduce satellite communications for its aircraft.
- September 30 - The New Zealand company Straits Air Freight Express (Safe Air), operating cargo flights and a combined cargo-passenger service from New Zealand to the Chatham Islands stops flying operations. It continues to operate as an aircraft maintenance and engineering company.

=== October ===
- October 2
  - Wishing to seek political asylum in Taiwan, Jiang Xiaofeng hijacks Xiamen Airlines Flight 8301 during a flight from Xiamen Gaoqi International Airport in Xiamen, China, to Guangzhou, China, demanding that it be flown to Taipei, Taiwan. When the pilot explains that the aircraft lacks the fuel to fly to Taipei and proposes that it fly to Hong Kong instead, Jiang insists on flying to Taipei. After a lengthy discussion, the pilot decides that he lacks the fuel to continue and opts to land at Guangzhou's Guangzhou Baiyun International Airport against Jiang's wishes, and Jiang wrestles control of the aircraft from him moments before landing. The Xiamen plane sideswipes a parked China Southwest Airlines Boeing 707-320B – injuring its pilot, who is the only person on board – then collides with China Southern Airlines Flight 2812, a Boeing 757-21B awaiting takeoff with 122 people on board, before flipping onto its back and coming to a stop. Eighty-two of the 102 people aboard the hijacked Xiamen plane die – including the hijacker – as do 46 of the 122 people aboard the China Southern plane, bringing the combined death toll to 128.
  - East Germany's air force, the Luftstreitkräfte der Nationalen Volksarmee ("Air Forces of the National People's Army") is dissolved at midnight along with the rest of the East German armed forces as East Germany is reunified with West Germany. Its aircraft, personnel, and facilities become part of the German Luftwaffe.
- October 2–6 – The U.S. Navy aircraft carrier USS Independence (CV-62) operates in the Persian Gulf, demonstrating the feasibility of such operations as the Coalition build-up in the confrontation with Iraq over Kuwait continues.
- October 4 – On the day after German reunification, East Germany's national civil aviation authority, the Staatliche Luftfahrt-Inspektion der DDR (Public Department of Aviation of the GDR), is disestablished, and West Germany's Luftfahrt-Bundesamt (Federal aviation Office) takes over all functions as the national civil aviation authority of unified Germany.
- October 28
  - When the Iraqi tanker Amuriyah refuses to stop for inspection by Coalition warships enforcing an embargo against Iraq, the pursuit of her by Coalition forces includes low-level flyovers by U.S. Navy aircraft carrier-based F-14 Tomcats and F/A-18 Hornets.
  - Lufthansa begins service to Berlin. Prior to the German reunification five days earlier, it had been prohibited from flying to Berlin.
- October 31 – The Australian airline industry is deregulated. Airlines are allowed to select their own routes and set their own fares.

=== November ===
- November 14 – While attempting to land at Zurich Airport in Zurich, Switzerland, Alitalia Flight 404, a McDonnell Douglas DC-9-32, crashes into the Stadlerberg mountain 8 km (5.0 mi) short of the runway due to a faulty instrument landing system. All 46 people on board die.

=== December ===
- OceanAir – the future Azores Airlines – is founded. It will begin operations as a non-scheduled carrier in 1991.
- December 3
  - 1990 Wayne County Airport runway collision, a Douglas DC-9-14 with 44 people on board, mistakenly taxis onto an active runway at Detroit Metropolitan Wayne County Airport in Romulus, Michigan, in dense fog and is struck by Northwest Airlines Flight 299, a departing Boeing 727-215 with 154 people on board. Eight die and 10 suffer injuries on the DC-9.
  - Continental Airlines files for its second bankruptcy.
- December 19 – Northwest Airlines buys a 25% share in Hawaiian Airlines.
- December 21 – American aircraft designer Kelly Johnson dies, aged 80.
- December 28 –The Soviet airline Transaero is incorporated. It is the first private airline approved to provide scheduled passenger service in the Soviet Union. It will begin passenger service in November 1991 and scheduled passenger service in January 1993.

== First flights ==
=== January ===
- January 10 – McDonnell Douglas MD-11

=== February ===
- February 11 – Denel Rooivalk
- February 19 – Scaled Composites ARES

=== March ===
- March 29 – Ilyushin Il-114

=== April ===
- April 13 – Sukhoi Su-27IB prototype
- April 20 – PZL-126 Mrówka
- April 27 – Gavilán G358

=== May ===
- May 1 – McDonnell Douglas MD 520N
- May 11 - Schempp-Hirth Nimbus-4

=== July ===
- July 18 – EMBRAER/FMA CBA-123

=== August ===
- August 27 – Northrop YF-23

=== September ===
- September 29 – YF-22 Raptor

=== October ===
- October 10 – Learjet 60
- October 11 – Rockwell/MBB X-31

=== November ===
- November 14 - Air Tractor AT-802
- November 21 – K-8 Karakorum (Hongdu JL-8)

== Entered service ==
=== September ===
- September 30 – Piaggio P.180 Avanti

=== October ===
- October 4 – deliveries of Piaggio Avanti to various operators commence

== Deadliest crash ==
The deadliest crash of this year was an unusual incident: in the Guangzhou Baiyun aircraft collisions, which occurred on 2 October in Guangzhou, China, 128 people were killed when a hijacked Boeing 737 struck two other aircraft during an emergency landing in which the hijacker attempted to gain control of the aircraft. The deadliest single-aircraft accident was Indian Airlines Flight 605, an Airbus A320 which crashed whilst attempting to land at Bangalore, India, on 14 February, killing 92 of the 146 people on board.

== Sources ==
- Lambert, Mark. Jane's All The World's Aircraft 1990–1991. Coulsdon, UK: Jane's Defence Data, 1990. ISBN 0-7106-0908-6.
- Lambert, Mark. Jane's All The World's Aircraft 1991–1992. Coulsdon, UK: Jane's Defence Data, 1991. ISBN 0-7106-0965-5.
