= Ground collision =

Collision while an aircraft is taxiing

The Tenerife airport disaster is the deadliest accident in aviation history

A ground collision (GCOL) is a collision that occurs while an aircraft is taxiing to or from its runway. Ground collisions occur when an aircraft collides with another aircraft, ground vehicle or object on the runway.

== Causal factors ==
- lack of sufficient training for aviation staff
- lack of sufficient signage and lighting
- lack of space at various parts of the aircraft's pathway, especially the maneuvering area

== Incidents ==
Legend:

Runway collision involving two or more aircraft
Runway collision with other objects

Date	Fatalities (Note: All deaths directly attributable to the collision are counted as fatalities.)	Survivors (Note: In general, only occupants of an aircraft directly involved in the ground collision are counted as survivors. Bystanders who received nonfatal or no injuries, such as airshow spectators, participants in a military exercise, occupants of nearby noninvolved aircraft, and/or airport ground crew, are not included unless their involvement in the incident is particularly notable.)	Flight(s) involved	Site	Description
24 June 1935	17	3	Ford 5-AT-B Trimotor F-31 / Ford 5-AT-B Trimotor C-31	Olaya Herrera Airport, Medellín, Colombia	A Ford Trimotor F-31 collided with a Ford Trimotor C-31 after the F-31 lost control due to strong lateral winds in combination with irregularities in the surface of the runway, that led the left main gear to leave the ground before rotation. Only three people on the F-31 survived.
22 December 1952	13	0	Royal Hellenic Air Force Douglas C-47D / USAF Lockheed F-80C Shooting Star	Su Won (K-13) Air Base, South Korea	A United States Air Force Lockheed F-80C Shooting Star collided with a Greek Douglas C-47D after the C-47D taxied onto an active runway while the F-80C was taking off, killing everyone on both aircraft.
23 November 1964	50	23	TWA Flight 800 (1964)	Leonardo da Vinci–Fiumicino Airport, Rome, Italy	TWA Flight 800 (a Boeing 707) collided with a compactor that was crossing the runway during takeoff.
20 December 1972	10	128	North Central Airlines Flight 575 / Delta Air Lines Flight 954	O'Hare International Airport, Chicago, Illinois, United States	North Central Airlines Flight 575 (a McDonnell Douglas DC-9) collided during its takeoff roll with Delta Air Lines Flight 954 (a Convair CV-880) while the CV-880 was taxiing across a fog-shrouded runway at O'Hare International Airport in Chicago, Illinois, killing ten people and injuring 17.
18 April 1974	1	92	Court Line Flight 95 / Piper PA-23 Aztec G-AYDE	Luton Airport, Luton, Bedfordshire, England	Court Line Flight 95 (a BAC One-Eleven) collided with a Piper PA-23 Aztec after the PA-23 entered the active runway without permission. The pilot of the PA-23 was killed, while the passenger survived, along with all 91 people of Flight 95.
27 March 1977	583	61	KLM Flight 4805 / Pan Am Flight 1736	Los Rodeos Airport (now Tenerife North Ciudad de La Laguna Airport), Tenerife, Canary Islands, Spain	Two Boeing 747 passenger jets, KLM Flight 4805 and Pan Am Flight 1736, collided on the runway at Los Rodeos Airport (now Tenerife North Airport), on the Spanish island of Tenerife, Canary Islands, killing 583 people, making it the deadliest accident in aviation history.
31 October 1979	73 (including one on the ground)	17	Western Airlines Flight 2605	Mexico City International Airport, Mexico City, Mexico	Western Airlines Flight 2605 (a McDonnell Douglas DC-10) struck construction equipment while landing on a runway that was closed for maintenance.
14 August 1982	11	82	Aeroflot Flight 974 / Aeroflot Flight G-73	Sukhumi-Babusheri Airport, Abkhazia, Georgia	Aeroflot Flight 974 (a Tupolev Tu-134) collided with Aeroflot Flight G-73 (a Let L-410 Turbolet) after both aircraft attempted to takeoff from the same runway, from opposite directions. Everyone on board flight G-73 was killed, while everyone on board flight 974 survived.
14 September 1983	11	95	CAAC Hawker-Siddeley Trident / People's Liberation Army Air Force Harbin H-5	Guilin-Qifengling Airport, Guilin, Guangxi, China	A military Harbin H-5 bomber crashed into the side of a CAAC Airlines Hawker-Siddeley Trident while it was taxiing down the runway, killing eleven people on the Trident. The fate of the crew on the H-5 bomber is not known.
7 December 1983	93	42	Iberia Flight 350 / Aviaco Flight 134	Madrid–Barajas Airport, Madrid, Spain	Iberia Flight 350 (a Boeing 727) was involved in a runway collision with Aviaco Flight 134 (a McDonnell Douglas DC-9) after taxiing across a fog-shrouded runway into the path of the DC-9 while it was taking off. Only 42 people survived, all on Flight 350, at least 30 of which sustained injuries.
20 December 1983	1 (on the ground)	86	Ozark Air Lines Flight 650	Sioux Falls Regional Airport, Sioux Falls, South Dakota, United States	Ozark Air Lines Flight 650 (a McDonnell Douglas DC-9) struck a snow plow while taxiing down a runway, killing the snow plow operator.
23 December 1983	0	12	Korean Air Lines Flight 084 / SouthCentral Air Flight 59	Ted Stevens Anchorage International Airport, Anchorage, Alaska, United States	Korean Air Lines Flight 084 (a McDonnell Douglas DC-10) collided during takeoff with SouthCentral Air Flight 59 (a Piper PA-31-350) as a result of the Flight 084 crew becoming disoriented while taxiing in dense fog and attempting to takeoff on the wrong runway. Both aircraft were destroyed, but there were no fatalities on either aircraft.
11 October 1984	178 (including four on the ground)	5	Aeroflot Flight 3352	Omsk Airport, Omsk, Russian SFSR, Soviet Union	A Tupolev Tu-154B-1 hit maintenance vehicles on the runway while attempting to land in Omsk, Russia. The ground controller allowed maintenance workers to dry the runway during heavy rain and fell asleep on the job. 174 people aboard the aircraft were killed, along with four workers on the ground. This incursion is the deadliest aviation accident in Russian territory.
21 October 1987	18	1	Soviet Air Forces Antonov An-12BK / Mil Mi-24	Kabul Airport, Kabul, Afghanistan	An Antonov An-12 collided with a Mil Mi-24 helicopter in poor visibility, killing all but one person on the An-12.
2 October 1990	128	95	Xiamen Airlines Flight 8301 / China Southern Airlines Flight 3523 / China Southwest Airlines Flight 4305	Guangzhou Baiyun International Airport (former), Guangzhou, China	A hijacked Boeing 737 collided with two other aircraft on the runways of the old Guangzhou Baiyun International Airport while attempting to land. The hijacked aircraft struck parked China Southwest Airlines Flight 4305 first, inflicting only minor damage, but then collided with China Southern Airlines Flight 3523, a Boeing 757 waiting to takeoff, flipping onto its back. A total of 128 people were killed, including seven of nine crew members and 75 of 93 passengers on Flight 8301 and 46 of 110 passengers on Flight 3523.
3 December 1990	8	190	Northwest Airlines Flight 1482 / Northwest Airlines Flight 299	Detroit Metropolitan Wayne County Airport, Romulus, Michigan, United States	Northwest Airlines Flight 1482, operated by a McDonnell-Douglas DC-9, taxied onto an active runway in heavy fog at the same time as Northwest Airlines Flight 299, operated by a Boeing 727, was undertaking its takeoff roll. The 727's wing sliced through the DC-9's fuselage, killing eight people aboard the latter aircraft, which was subsequently destroyed by fire; the 727 sustained damage to its wing, but was able to perform a rejected takeoff and stop safely on the remaining runway, and was later repaired and returned to service.
1 February 1991	35	66	USAir Flight 1493 / SkyWest Airlines Flight 5569	Los Angeles International Airport, Los Angeles, California, United States	USAir Flight 1493 was a scheduled passenger flight from Syracuse Hancock International Airport, New York, to San Francisco International Airport, via Washington, D.C.; Columbus, Ohio; and Los Angeles. On the evening of February 1, 1991, the Boeing 737-300 serving the flight collided with SkyWest Flight 5569, a Metroliner turboprop aircraft, upon landing at Los Angeles.
25 July 1993	0	193	Flagship Airlines Flight 4944 / Saudi Arabian Airlines Flight 039	John F. Kennedy International Airport, New York City, New York, United States	Saudi Arabian Airlines Flight 039, a Boeing 747-300 and Flagship Airlines Flight 4944, an ATR 42-300 were both taxiing on taxiway Kilo when the ATR 42 was given clearance to line up on taxiway Kilo Bravo, which intersected taxiway Kilo, to await takeoff clearance. The captain of the Boeing 747, who was conducting a cabin announcement at the time, incorrectly judged that he had enough clearance to maneuver around the ATR 42. The outboard section of the left wing on the Boeing 747 was minorly damaged while the vertical stabilizer and rudder of the ATR 42 was substantially damaged. There were no injuries.
22 November 1994	2	140	TWA Flight 427 / Superior Aviation Cessna 441 Conquest II	St. Louis Lambert International Airport, Bridgeton, Missouri, United States	Cessna pilot error at Lambert-St. Louis International Airport. The pilot taxied to an incorrect runway and was struck by departing TWA MD-80; there were two fatalities on the Cessna.
19 November 1996	14	0	United Express Flight 5925 / Beechcraft 65-A90 King Air	Quincy Regional Airport, Gilmer Township, Adams County, Illinois, United States	United Express Flight 5925 was landing at Quincy Regional Airport when the pilot of a Beechcraft King Air started to takeoff on an intersecting runway. As the field was uncontrolled, the United Express pilots inquired whether the King Air was clear of the runways. They received no response except for a call from a Piper Cherokee saying they were holding short. The King Air and United Express collided at the intersection of the two runways killing all 12 on board Flight 5925 and the pilot and passenger of the Beechcraft King Air.
25 May 2000	1	157	Air Liberte Flight 8807 / Shorts 330-200	Charles de Gaulle Airport, Paris, France	A McDonnell Douglas MD-83 operating as Air Liberte Flight 8807 collided with a Shorts 330-200 with its left wing while taking off. One of the pilots in the Shorts 330-200 was killed; the other pilot was seriously injured. The MD-83 aborted takeoff at a speed of 155 knots. There were no injuries to the 151 passengers and 6 crew members on the MD-83. The MD-83 sustained substantial damage to its left wing but was later repaired. An investigation concluded that the runway incursion was caused by ATC error.
31 October 2000	83	96	Singapore Airlines Flight 006	Taoyuan International Airport, Taoyuan, Taiwan	Singapore Airlines Flight 006 (a Boeing 747) struck construction equipment during takeoff on a runway that was closed for maintenance.
8 October 2001	118 (including four on the ground)	0	Scandinavian Airlines System Flight 686 / Air Evex D-IEVX	Linate Airport, Milan, Italy	Scandinavian Airlines System Flight 686 collided on takeoff with a Cessna Citation registered D-IEVX that had turned onto the wrong taxiway, causing it to enter the runway.
4 January 2005	0	2	Tri-MG Intra Asia Airlines Boeing 737-2A9C	Banda Aceh, Indonesia	A Boeing 737-2A9C, which was bringing emergency aid to victims of an earthquake and tsunami was involved in a ground collision with a water buffalo on a runway, which seriously delayed relief flights.
15 January 2009	4	34	Ilyushin Il-76MD RA-76825 / Ilyushin Il-76MD RA-76827	Uytash Airport, Makhachkala, Dagestan, Russia	Two Ilyushin Il-76 transport aircraft of the Russian Ministry of Internal Affairs (MVD) collided at Uytash Airport serving the city of Makhachkala in Dagestan, Russia.
18 August 2012	1 (on the ground)	4	Cessna 172N Ram	Ōtone Airfield, Saitama Prefecture, Japan	A Cessna 172N Ram killed a worker mowing the grass at Ōtone Airfield, during a touch-and-go attempt.
20 October 2014	4	1 (on the ground)	Unijet Flight 074P	Moscow Vnukovo Airport, Russia	A Dassault Falcon 50 collided on takeoff with a snow plow that had strayed onto the runway at Moscow Vnukovo Airport, killing everyone on board the aircraft, including Total oil company chairman and CEO Christophe de Margerie.
4 April 2016	0	60	Batik Air Flight 7703 / TransNusa PK-TNJ	Halim Perdanakusuma Airport, Jakarta, Indonesia	Batik Air Flight 7703 (a Boeing 737) collided during its takeoff roll with a TransNusa Air Services aircraft, which was being towed across the runway.
7 May 2020	1 (on the ground)	58	Southwest Airlines Flight 1392	Austin–Bergstrom International Airport, Austin, Texas, United States	An adult male intruder entered the grounds of Austin–Bergstrom International Airport and made his way to the airport's runway 17R, being struck and killed by a Boeing 737-7H4 operating Southwest Airlines Flight 1392 as it landed at the airport. There were no injuries or fatalities to the 58 people on board the aircraft, although substantial damage was sustained to the 737's left engine nacelle.
2 September 2022	2 (on the ground)	79	TAP Air Portugal Flight 1492	Ahmed Sékou Touré International Airport, Conakry, Guinea	Engine 2 of TAP Air Portugal Flight 1492, an Airbus A320-251N, struck a motorcycle that crossed the runway at Ahmed Sékou Touré International Airport during the plane’s landing roll. Both riders on the motorcycle perished, however everyone on board the plane were unharmed. Engine 2 of the plane was damaged from the collision.
18 November 2022	3 (on the ground)	108	LATAM Airlines Perú Flight 2213	Jorge Chávez International Airport, Lima, Peru	A LATAM Perú Airbus A320neo taking off from Jorge Chávez International Airport as LATAM Perú Flight 2213 to Juliaca collided with an airport fire engine that was crossing the runway, killing two firefighters and injuring a third, who died from his injuries seven months later. There were no fatalities among the 102 passengers and six crew members aboard, however 40 people sustained injuries. The aircraft sustained critical damage and was written off.
2 January 2024	5	380	Japan Airlines Flight 516 / Japan Coast Guard DHC-8	Tokyo Haneda International Airport, Tokyo, Japan	A Japan Airlines Airbus A350-900 operating as Japan Airlines Flight 516 collided with a Japan Coast Guard De Havilland Dash-8 while landing at Tokyo Haneda Airport. Both aircraft burst into flames and were completely destroyed. This marked the first hull loss of an Airbus A350. All 379 passengers and crew onboard the A350 survived however five of the six crew members onboard the Coast Guard aircraft were killed. The destroyed Dash-8 was due to provide support to the emergency actions after an earthquake the day before.
31 March 2024	0	7	Safe Air Company Boeing 727 / African Express Airways MD-82	Malakal Airport, Malakal, South Sudan	A Safe Air Company Boeing 727 operating a cargo flight from Juba had a runway excursion during landing at Malakal Airport. During the excursion the plane collided with a parked African Express Airways McDonnell Douglas MD-80 that had an incident a few months prior. All the 7 on board the 727 survived with one injured, but both planes were destroyed.
10 September 2024	0	295	Delta Air Lines Flight 295 / Delta Connection Flight 5526	Hartsfield–Jackson Atlanta International Airport, Clayton County and Fulton County, Georgia, United States	The right wingtip of a Delta Air Lines Airbus A350-941 taxiing before takeoff for Tokyo collided with and knocked over the tail fin of an Endeavor Air Bombardier CRJ900R preparing to depart for Lafayette, Louisiana. None of the 236 people on board the former plane and 59 people on board the latter plane were injured or killed.
20 October 2025	2 (on the ground)	4	Emirates SkyCargo Flight 9788	Hong Kong International Airport, Hong Kong	An Air ACT Boeing 747-481BDSF, operated on behalf of Emirates SkyCargo, suffered a runway excursion following touchdown and crashed into the South China Sea, during which the aircraft collided with an airport patrol vehicle. The collision killed the 2 ground crew inside the vehicle, whilst the 4 crew of the plane survived and were transported to hospital.
22 March 2026	2	74	Air Canada Express Flight 8646	LaGuardia Airport, New York City, New York, United States	A Bombardier CRJ900LR operated by Jazz Aviation on behalf of Air Canada Express collided with an airport fire truck (ARFF engine) during landing, after the engine was initially given clearance to cross the runway to attend an emergency. The collision destroyed the aircraft's cockpit and front galley, which killed the captain and first officer of the flight. 41 people consisting of passengers, flight crew and the two occupants of the fire truck were hospitalized.
08 May 2026	1 (on the ground)	231	Frontier Airlines Flight 4345	Denver International Airport, Colorado, United States	An Airbus A321neo operated by Frontier Airlines struck a person on the ground during takeoff, and subsequently also experienced an engine fire, leading to the pilots aborting the takeoff. The individual on the ground was partially consumed by the engine and killed.

== See also ==
- Mid-air collision
- Runway incursion
