= Flight 2311 =

Flight 2311 may refer to:

- CAAC Flight 2311, aviation accident of an Ilyushin Il-18B in 1982
- Atlantic Southeast Airlines Flight 2311 aviation accident of an Embraer EMB-120 Brasilia in 1991
- Angara Airlines Flight 2311, aviation accident of an Antonov An-24RV in 2025
