= Smoking section =

Smoking section may refer to:

- A section of a restaurant, airplane, or other space where smoking is permitted
- The Smoking Section, column in Rolling Stone
- Smokin' Section, album by Tom Scott (saxophonist)
- Smokin' Section, Brent Mason and Randy Mason album
- "Smoking Section", song by St Vincent from Masseduction

== See also ==
- Inflight smoking
- Smoking ban
- Smoking room
