= Smokers Express =

American airline company

IATA	ICAO	Call sign
—	—	—
- Founded: 1993; 33 years ago
- Ceased operations: 1993; 33 years ago
- Operating bases: 1 (planned)
- Fleet size: 3 (planned)
- Destinations: 11 (planned)
- Headquarters: Cocoa Beach, Florida
- Key people: William Walts; George "Mickey" Richardson

Smokers Express (or Smokers Express Airlines) was a Cocoa Beach, Florida-based company that would have provided smoking flights to destinations within the United States. Founded in 1993 by William Walts and George "Mickey" Richardson, the company never received enough funding to begin operations.

== Concept ==
Upset not only by the non-smoking policy of most major airlines but also by the quality of other amenities such as food and in-flight entertainment, Walts conceived the idea of a "smokers airline". His company would not only allow smoking on flights, but encourage it by handing out free cigarettes and "full-size" ashtrays during flight. The airline also advertised free headsets (for listening to in-flight entertainment) and "real food for real people", which consisted of hamburgers, pizza, and steaks.

To avoid Federal Aviation Administration restrictions on smoking on flights within the United States, Smokers Express was intended to be a membership-based airline, which would have exempted it from the FAA's non-smoking restrictions as they existed at the time. Customers would have been required to join and pay a $25 yearly fee, and only persons age 21 or older would have been allowed to join. A side effect to this policy was a promise that the flights would be free of "screaming babies." This "loophole" was eventually closed in 2000 by section 708 of the Wendell H. Ford Aviation Investment and Reform Act for the 21st Century, which prohibited smoking on intra-US flights entirely.

Walts and Richardson reportedly sought sponsorships from major tobacco companies as a source of funding, stating that any sponsors would receive a custom aircraft livery promoting the brand.

== Aircraft ==
The company began by purchasing three McDonnell Douglas DC-9 aircraft, with the intention of leasing 27 additional DC-9s. The aircraft would have been renovated with a high-volume air recirculation system, as well as improved flame-retardant carpet.

== Routes ==
The airline originally intended to fly to 11 different destinations, adding more as additional funding enabled. The planned initial destinations were:

- Las Vegas, Nevada
- Dallas–Fort Worth, Texas
- Houston, Texas
- New Orleans, Louisiana
- Oklahoma City, Oklahoma
- Tulsa, Oklahoma
- Newark, New Jersey
- Atlantic City, New Jersey
- Orlando, Florida
- Titusville, Florida
- Miami, Florida

The first flight would have taken place on September 25, 1993, and flown from Florida to Washington D.C. for a Smokers' Rights March at the White House. It was later rescheduled to January 26, 1994, where it would have traveled from Raleigh–Durham International Airport (RDU) to Washington, D.C., to protest a federal cigarette tax.

== Company structure ==
Smokers Express was designed to be an employee-owned company. It relied mostly on membership dues and ticket sales; however, no tickets were ever sold. The company did not advertise directly, but relied on word-of-mouth, various articles and TV news references. Despite what the company perceived as a positive response to their concept, it failed to raise enough funds to begin operations.

By June 7, 1994, the company appeared to have been disbanded, as the company's phone number had been disconnected.

== See also ==
- Inflight smoking
- List of defunct airlines of the United States
