= CAAC Flight 2311 =

1982 aviation accident

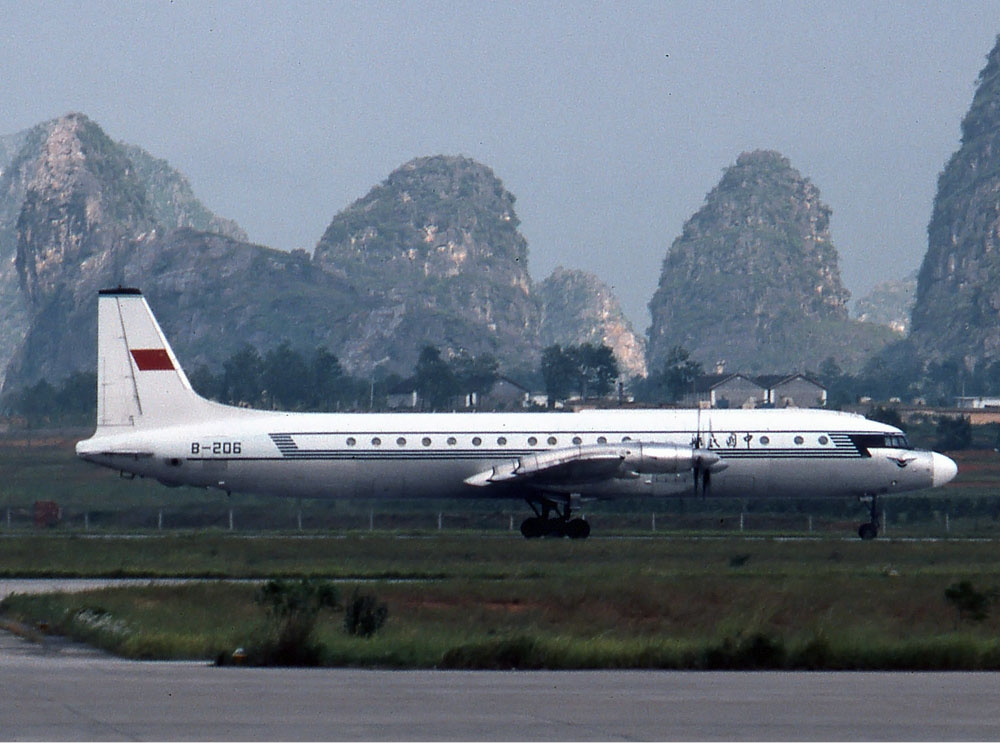
- A Ilyushin Il-18 similar to the one involved in the incident

Accident
- Date: 24 December 1982
- Summary: Destroyed by fire on landing
- Site: Guangzhou Baiyun International Airport (former), China; 23°11′0.40″N 113°16′5.11″E

Aircraft
- Aircraft type: Ilyushin Il-18B
- Operator: CAAC Airlines
- Registration: B-202
- Flight origin: Lanzhou Zhongchuan International Airport (LHW/ZLLL)
- 1st stopover: Xi'an Xiguan Airport (SIA/ZLSN)
- Last stopover: Changsha Datuopu Airport (CSX/ZGCS)
- Destination: Guangzhou Baiyun International Airport (former) (CAN/ZGGG)
- Occupants: 69
- Passengers: 58
- Crew: 11
- Fatalities: 25
- Injuries: 26
- Survivors: 44

CAAC Flight 2311 was a scheduled domestic passenger flight from Changsha Datuopu Airport, in Changsha, the capital of Hunan Province, China, to the former Guangzhou Baiyun International Airport. On 24 December 1982, it was flown by an Ilyushin Il-18B (registered in China as B-202). After landing at Baiyun Airport, a fire in the cabin produced toxic smoke whereupon the crew stopped the aircraft on the runway and evacuated the passengers. The fast-developing fire killed 25 passengers and seriously injured 22 passengers and 4 crew members. The fire, which was started by a passenger's cigarette, destroyed the aircraft.

== Aircraft ==
The aircraft B-202 was an Ilyushin Il-18B four-engined turboprop built in the Soviet Union in 1959.

== See also ==
- Inflight smoking
- Olympic Airways v. Husain – a US Supreme Court case arising from a passenger's death due to inflight smoking

=== Similar accidents ===
- Saudia Flight 163
- Air Canada Flight 797
- China Airlines Flight 120
