= Changsha Datuopu Airport =

Changsha Datuopu Airport 长沙大托铺机场
- IATA: none; ICAO: ZGCS

Summary
- Airport type: Military
- Serves: Changsha, Hunan, China
- Opened: 1957
- Passenger services ceased: 29 August 1989
- Elevation AMSL: 46 m / 151 ft
- Coordinates: 28°4′9″N 112°57′26″E

Map

Runways
| Direction | Length | | Surface |
| Direction | m | ft | Surface |
|---|---|---|---|
| | 2,490 | 8,169 | Paved |

Changsha Datuopu Airport (ICAO: ZGCS) (Chinese: 长沙大托铺机场), or Datuopu Air Base, is a military air base in Changsha, the capital of South Central China's Hunan province. It also served as the public airport for Changsha from 1957 until 1989, when all civil flights were transferred to the new Changsha Huanghua International Airport.

Datuopu Airport has a single runway measuring 2,490 metres (8,170 ft) by 27.5 metres (90 ft). Its elevation is 46 metres (151 ft) above mean sea level.

From 1957 to 1989, Datuopu served as a dual-use military and civil airport. It was only capable of handling small aircraft and a few flights per day. Construction for Changsha Huanghua Airport began in 1986, and it was opened on 29 August 1989. All civil flights were transferred to the new airport, and Datuopu Airport reverted to sole military use.

== Use Over Time ==
In late 2024 and 2026, Datuopu Air Base was used for bombing exercises by the PLAAF using the Xi'an H-6 (Hōng-6), Between 2024 and 2026 renovations occurred to the base and the runway was repaired back to its original state. In 2022 Datuopu Air Base hosted 42 Su-30MKK , 8 Chengdu J-9 and 7 Xi'an H-6 (Hōng-6), This seemed to be the height of activity for the base going forward.

== Accidents and incidents ==
- On 21 January 1976, A CAAC Antonov An-24 (B-492) crashed on approach to the airport upon arrival from Guangzhou, killing all 40 on board.
- On 20 March 1980, another CAAC Antonov An-24 (B-484) crashes on approach upon arrival from Guiyang and burst into flames, killing all 26.
