= 2000 Charles de Gaulle runway collision =

2000 runway incursion and collision at CDG Airport

2000 Charles de Gaulle runway collision Air Liberté Flight 8807 · Streamline Aviation Flight 200
- The aftermath shows damages of F-GHED

Accident
- Date: 25 May 2000
- Summary: Runway incursion due to ATC error
- Site: Charles de Gaulle Airport, France; 49°01′19″N 2°32′27″E
- Total fatalities: 1
- Total injuries: 1

First aircraft
- The McDonnell Douglas MD-83 involved, one year after the accident
- Type: McDonnell Douglas MD-83
- Operator: Air Liberté
- IATA flight No.: IJ8077
- ICAO flight No.: LIB8807
- Call sign: LIBERTE 8807
- Registration: F‑GHED
- Flight origin: Charles de Gaulle Airport, Paris, France
- Destination: Barajas Airport, Madrid, Spain
- Occupants: 157
- Passengers: 151
- Crew: 6
- Fatalities: 0
- Survivors: 157

Second aircraft
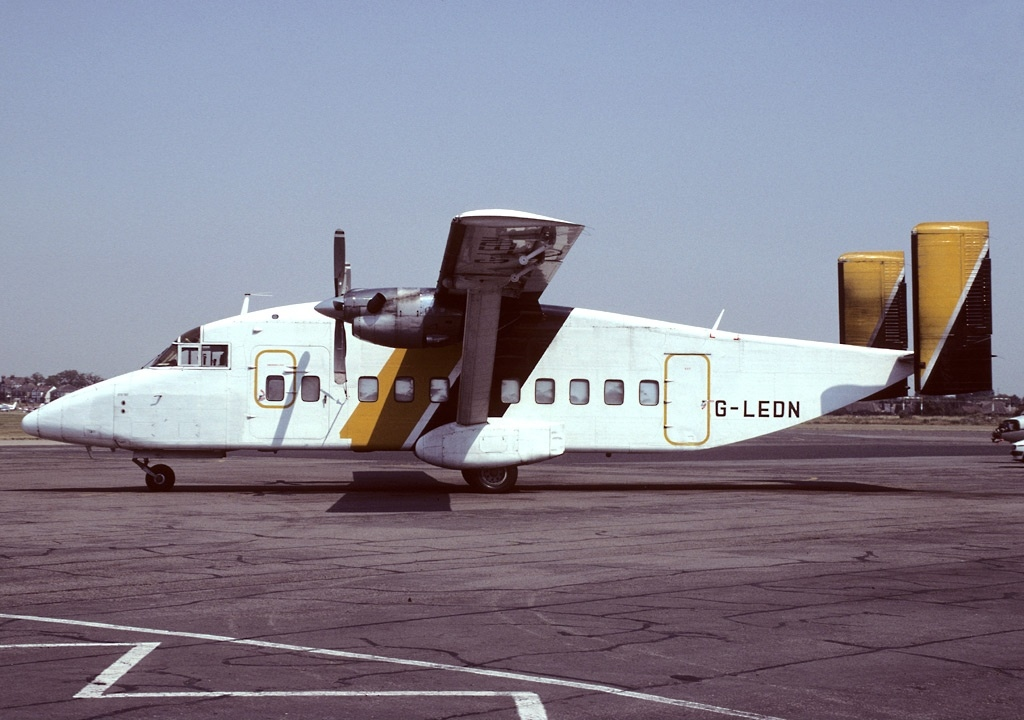
- The Shorts 330-200 involved in the accident with a previous operator (Janes Aviation) & registration.
- Type: Shorts 330‑200
- Operator: Streamline Aviation
- ICAO flight No.: SSW200
- Call sign: STREAMLINE 200
- Registration: G‑SSWN
- Flight origin: Charles de Gaulle Airport, Paris, France
- Destination: Luton Airport, London, United Kingdom
- Occupants: 2
- Crew: 2
- Fatalities: 1
- Injuries: 1
- Survivors: 1

On 25 May 2000, Air Liberté Flight 8807, a passenger charter flight operated by a McDonnell Douglas MD-83 (F‑GHED), collided with a Shorts 330‑200 freighter (G‑SSWN) operating as Streamline Aviation Flight 200 at Paris–Charles de Gaulle Airport during a runway incursion; the first officer of Flight 200 was killed and the captain was seriously injured, while on board Flight 8807 there were no injuries. The accident was blamed on the air traffic controller mistakenly thinking that Flight 200 was behind Flight 8807 when it was on the runway.

== Background ==
=== Passengers ===
Nationality	Passengers	Crew	Total
Spain	150	—	150
France	1	6	7
Total	151	6	157

Most passengers were Spanish returning to Madrid after Real Madrid won the 2000 UEFA Champions League Final one day before the collision. One passenger was French, and all six crew members were French.

=== Aircraft ===
==== Flight 8807 ====
The aircraft operating as Flight 8807 was a McDonnell Douglas MD‑83 (registration F‑GHED) and was operated by Air Liberté. It had 27,957 total airframe hours.

==== Flight 200 ====
The aircraft that was operating as Flight 200 was a Shorts 330-200 registered as G-SSWN. It was manufactured in 1981 and had 15,215 total airframe hours.

=== Crew ===
==== Flight 8807 ====
The captain, aged 55, had a total of 11,418 flight hours and approximately 3 years of experience on the MD‑83. The first officer, aged 47, had logged 11,104 flight hours and had been flying the MD‑83 for about 9 months.

==== Flight 200 ====
The captain was Gary Grant, aged 41, who had accumulated 2,440 total flight hours, including 1,005 on the Shorts 330. The first officer was John Andrews, aged 43, who had logged 4,370 flight hours, but had only 14 hours of experience on type.

== Accident ==
Streamline Aviation Flight 200 was cleared to "line up and wait, number two" from taxiway 16. However, the tower controller mistakenly believed the aircraft was positioned behind the MD‑83 operating as Air Liberté Flight 8807, when in reality, Flight 200 was entering the runway from taxiway 16. Flight 8807 was then cleared for takeoff and began its roll. Flight 200 made visual with Flight 8807 via their beacon lights, and immediately tried to brake. At approximately 155 knots, the MD‑83's left wing impacted the cockpit of the Shorts 330. The first officer on Flight 200 was killed instantly in the accident, while the captain sustained serious injuries. The MD‑83 aborted the takeoff safely.

The collision occurred at night under complex traffic conditions, including intersection departures, a high ATC workload, and limited visibility due to lighting conditions.

== Investigation ==
The French BEA concluded that the accident was caused by a mental model error by the controller believing the Shorts was behind the MD-83, when in reality, it was in front of the MD-83. Other factors included miscommunication between ground and tower controllers, confusing bilingual radio traffic, poor visibility, and the Shorts crew not confirming their position.

== Aftermath ==
The MD-83 suffered damage to its left wing and was repaired and returned to service. The Shorts 330 was written off. In response to the accident, BEA issued recommendations for mandatory English-only ATC at CDG, improved communication protocols, and stricter runway entry verification.

== See also ==
- 2016 Halim Airport runway collision
