= Inflight smoking =

Smoking tobacco on an aircraft

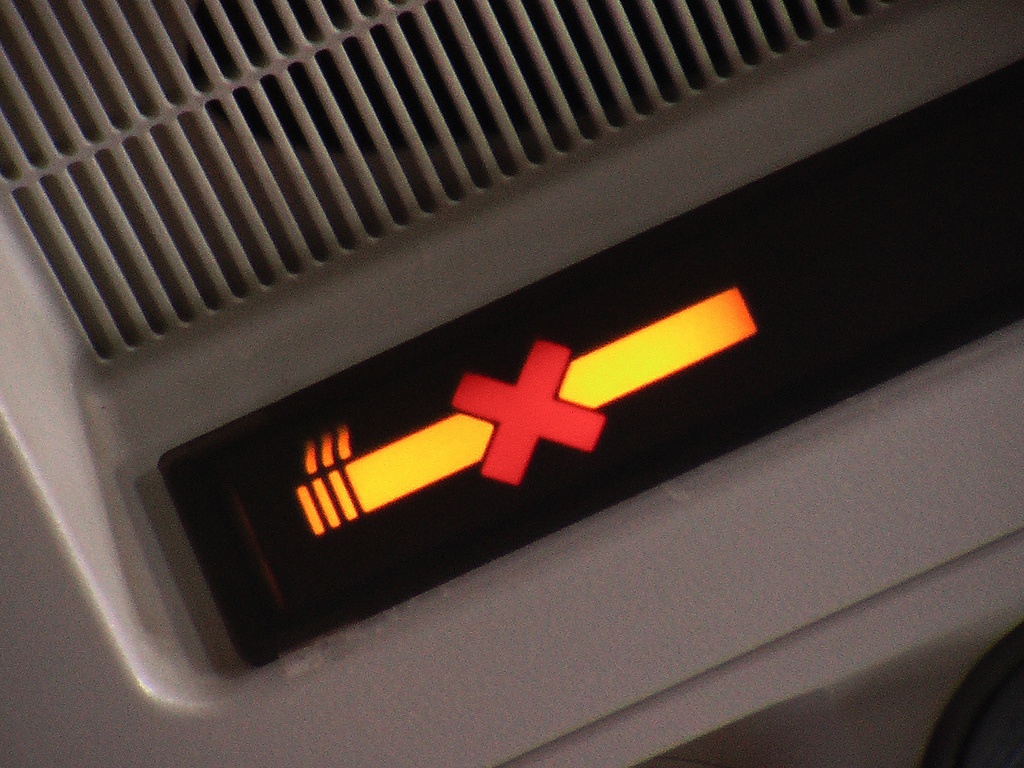
"No smoking" sign (Airbus version), as seen on most passenger flights worldwide

Inflight smoking is the act of smoking tobacco on an aircraft while in flight. While once prevalent, it is now prohibited by almost all airlines and by many governments around the world. The bans on inflight smoking have been imposed in a piecemeal manner around the world beginning in the 1980s. The use of electronic cigarettes and smokeless tobacco is also prohibited on many flights.

== History ==
=== International regulation ===
In 1992, the International Civil Aviation Organization (ICAO) adopted Assembly Resolution A29-15, urging states to restrict smoking progressively on international passenger flights with the objective of complete bans by 1 July 1996.

=== North America ===
In 1969, consumer advocate Ralph Nader was among the first in the United States to call for a smoking ban on airlines. Pressure for an inflight smoking ban also came from flight attendants' unions, such as the Association of Flight Attendants.

United Airlines created a nonsmoking section in 1971, the first airline to do so. In 1994, Delta was the first U.S. airline to ban smoking on all worldwide flights.

In the United States, both tobacco companies and airlines fought any regulation. In 1976, the U.S. Civil Aeronautics Board banned cigar and pipe smoking on aircraft, but under pressure from tobacco interests, it sought to limit this ban in 1978. Also, CAB banned and then unbanned smoking in 1984, with chairman Dan McKinnon saying, "Philosophically, I think nonsmokers have rights, but it comes into marked conflict with practicalities and the realities of life." After years of debate over health concerns, Congressional action in 1987 led to a ban on inflight smoking. In 1988, airlines based in the United States banned smoking on domestic flights of less than two hours, which was extended to domestic flights of less than six hours in February 1990, and all domestic and international flights in 2000. The 1990 ban applied to the passengers and cabin of the aircraft, but not the flight deck; pilots were allowed to continue smoking after the 1990 ban, due to concerns over potential flight safety issues caused by nicotine withdrawal in chronic smokers. In 2012 the Department of Transportation (DOT) issued an amendment to the smoking ban, 14 CFR Part 252, which applied an additional smoking ban to nonscheduled passenger flights when a flight attendant is a required crewmember. Despite its prohibition of smoking, the US Federal Aviation Administration regulations mandate that functioning ashtrays be conspicuously located on the doors of all airplane bathrooms. This is because there must be a safe place to dispose of a lit cigarette if someone violates the no-smoking rule.

In 1990, Air Canada adopted a nonsmoking policy on all its routes. In 1994, Canada was the first country to ban smoking on all flights operated by Canadian carriers, which also covered charter flights, but not foreign airlines flying to Canada. It had previously banned smoking on commercial domestic flights in Canada, and international flights of less than six hours, which did not cover the Japan routes. Canadian Airlines had opposed the blanket ban, saying it would put the airline at a competitive disadvantage, especially on the lucrative Japan route. It said it would lose millions of dollars in business from smoking passengers. It estimated it would lose $22 million in annual revenues on its 14 flights a week to Japan. It said that three quarters of its passengers on the Japan route were Japanese, and about 60% of them smoked.

In March 1995, the United States, Canada, and Australia agreed to ban smoking on international flights traveling between those countries.

Since 2012, the use of electronic cigarettes are also prohibited, and included under U.S. DOT rules that explicitly ban e-cigarette use on commercial flights where smoking is banned.

=== Japan ===
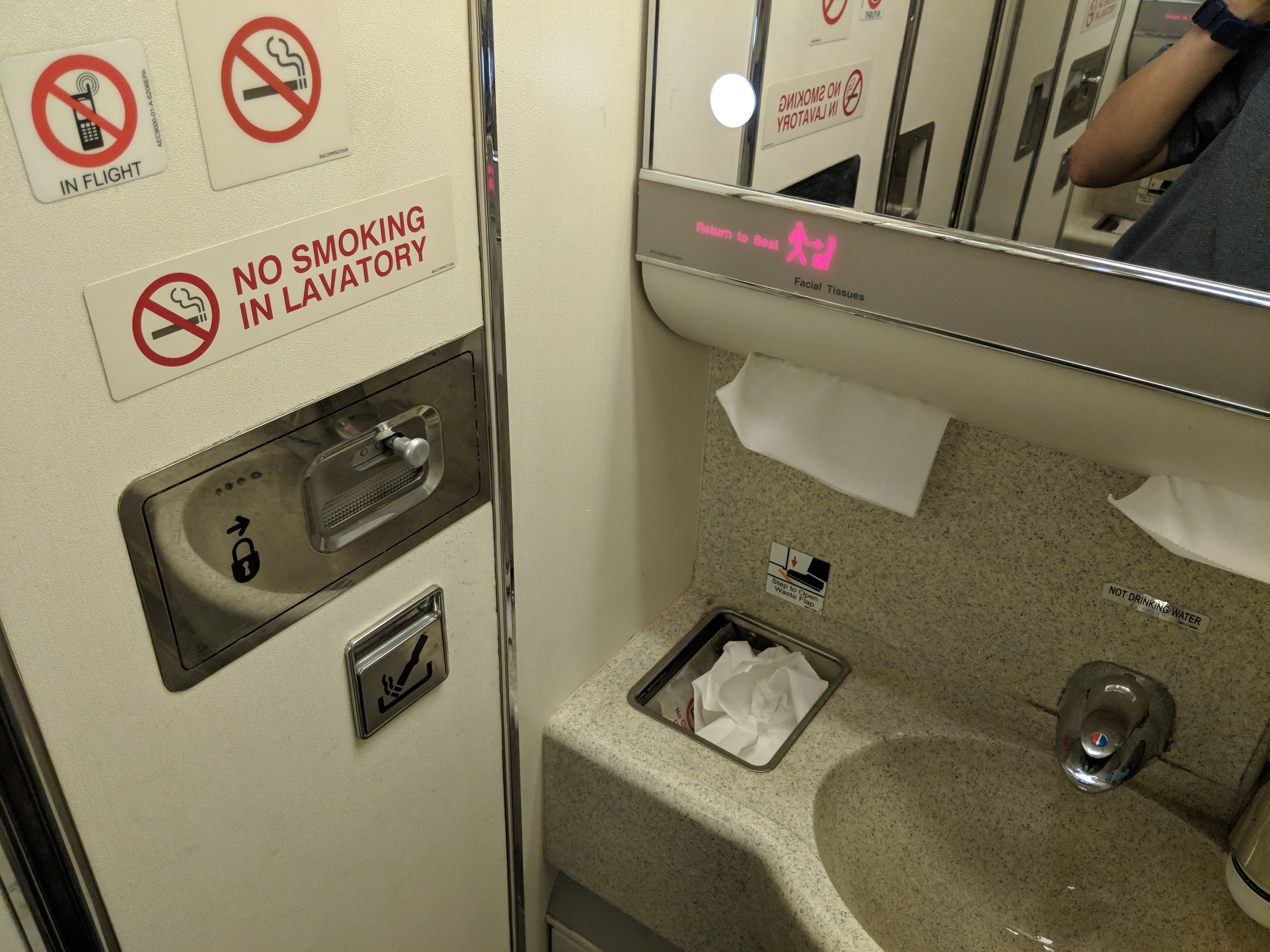
Despite a prohibition on smoking, many aircraft lavatories contain an ashtray, to minimize the risks with a non-compliant passenger putting a lit cigarette in the toilet or trash receptacle instead.

In April 1988, Japan Airlines (JAL) was the first Japanese airline to introduce a smoking ban on domestic flights of less than one hour, which was extended in October 1990 to flights of less than two hours. In 1998, All Nippon Airways and JAL banned smoking on all domestic flights, which covered more than 50% of Japanese domestic travelers. These airlines extended the ban to international flights in March 1999, among the last airlines to ban smoking on international flights. Japan Tobacco lobbied the airlines to reconsider the ban, noting that smoking was earlier banned on all flights of 22 foreign airlines using Japanese airports and that with the smoking ban by the two major Japanese airlines more than 80% of seats on international flights departing from Japan would be nonsmoking.

=== Europe ===
In 1988, SAS made domestic flights in Sweden and Norway non-smoking and in 1989, the policy was expanded to domestic flights in Denmark and flights between the Nordic countries. In 1996, SAS flights to the Benelux countries, France, Germany, Switzerland, Austria and the United Kingdom became non-smoking. In 1997 SAS banned smoking on all flights. Also in 1997, the European Union banned smoking on flights in member states. Air France, the French state-run carrier, did not allow inflight smoking from November 2000.

=== United Kingdom ===
Aurigny Air Services which is based in the Bailiwick of Guernsey became the first airline in the world to ban smoking entirely on its flights, in July 1977. The first United Kingdom airline to ban smoking was Loganair which banned smoking on all flights in 1980. The Flag carrier British Airways introduced a trial ban on smoking on some flights in 1990 and banned smoking on all flights in 1998. Virgin Atlantic banned smoking on all flights in 1995.

=== Other ===
Australia banned smoking on domestic flights from 1 December 1987, on international flights within Australian airspace from 1 September 1990, and from 1 July 1996 banned smoking on all Australian international flights.

Smoking is strictly prohibited on all commercial flights in Brazil. This applies to all domestic and international flights, and includes traditional cigarettes, cigars, and electronic smoking devices (vapes).

Iran's state-owned Iran Air, banned smoking on domestic and international flights taking less than 4 hours and a half, in 21 October 2000.

Cuba’s state-owned Cubana banned smoking on international flights in 2014.

China banned smoking on domestic flights in 1983. In 1993, China announced that all flights would be smoke-free by January 1995. Both 1983 and 1993 bans only applied to passengers smoking in the cabin, while pilots were allowed to smoke in the cockpit. A total ban of inflight smoking was announced in October 2017, and individual airlines were given two more years before a cockpit ban was to take effect; however, this concession was scrapped in January 2019 following incidents that triggered safety concerns and announced penalties for crew members who violate the rule. Depending on whether it is their first or repeated offence, pilots who are caught breaking this rule may face a suspension of up to 36 months.

== Consequences ==
The first smoking-related accident happened on 6 August 1937, when an international Aeroflot flight from Moscow to Prague crashed near Herina after a passenger lit a cigarette in the toilet, causing accumulated avgas fumes to ignite. All six occupants (three crew, three passengers) were killed.

Following the crash landing of Varig Flight 820 – due to a fire possibly caused by a lit cigarette thrown into a lavatory waste bin – in 1973, the U.S. Federal Aviation Administration banned smoking in aircraft lavatories. Following a fire that originated in a lavatory (not necessarily from smoking) on Air Canada Flight 797 in June 1983, resulting in the death of 23 passengers, new requirements to install smoke detectors in lavatories were brought in.

Normally, passengers found to be smoking on non-smoking flights will, at least, face a fine and, at most, be arrested and detained upon landing. Due to stringent security measures, this often causes disruptions; a flight may have to be diverted, or a scheduled landing might have to be expedited upon arrival at the destination airport in order to escort the smoker from the plane.

Such regulations have on occasion met with defiance; in 2010 a Qatari diplomat was arrested upon arrival at Denver International Airport for smoking in the onboard lavatory on United Airlines Flight 663 and making threats - when confronted by airline staff, he jokingly suggested that he was attempting to set his shoes on fire.

On February 3, 2013, a family of four were accused of smoking during a Sunwing Airlines flight from Halifax, Nova Scotia, Canada, to the Dominican Republic. The flight made an unscheduled landing at Bermuda L.F. Wade International Airport, where the two parents of the family were arrested by Bermuda Police Service and subsequently sentenced to a $500 fine or 10 days in prison.

Most new aircraft, built after the no-smoking regulations were put into place, now have a permanently lit no-smoking sign that cannot be independently turned off. Aircraft models designed after the no-smoking regulations were put into place, such as the Boeing 787 and Airbus A350, lack light-up no-smoking signs entirely, and instead put the no-smoking sign on a printed label. On 23 August 2024, the U.S. FAA amended its rule on passenger information signs to allow the "NO SMOKING" sign to be continuously illuminated, or turned off and on by crewmembers, updating earlier requirements that such signs be independently operable.

== Use of electronic cigarettes ==
E-cigarettes are also banned on flights, as well as transporting such devices in checked luggage, because of fire risk from their batteries. In July 2018, an Air China aircraft made an emergency descent after the co-pilot's e-cigarette triggered a false smoke alarm in the air conditioning system. The co-pilot turned off the air conditioning without notifying the captain, eventually triggering a low oxygen alarm for which the crew performed an emergency depressurization.

== See also ==
- CAAC Flight 2311, where 25 people died after a fire was caused by a passenger's cigarette.
- Olympic Airways v. Husain
- Smokers Express
- Smoking ban
