= 2016 Halim Airport runway collision =

2016 runway collision in Indonesia

2016 Halim Airport runway collision Batik Air Flight 7703 · TransNusa PK-TNJ
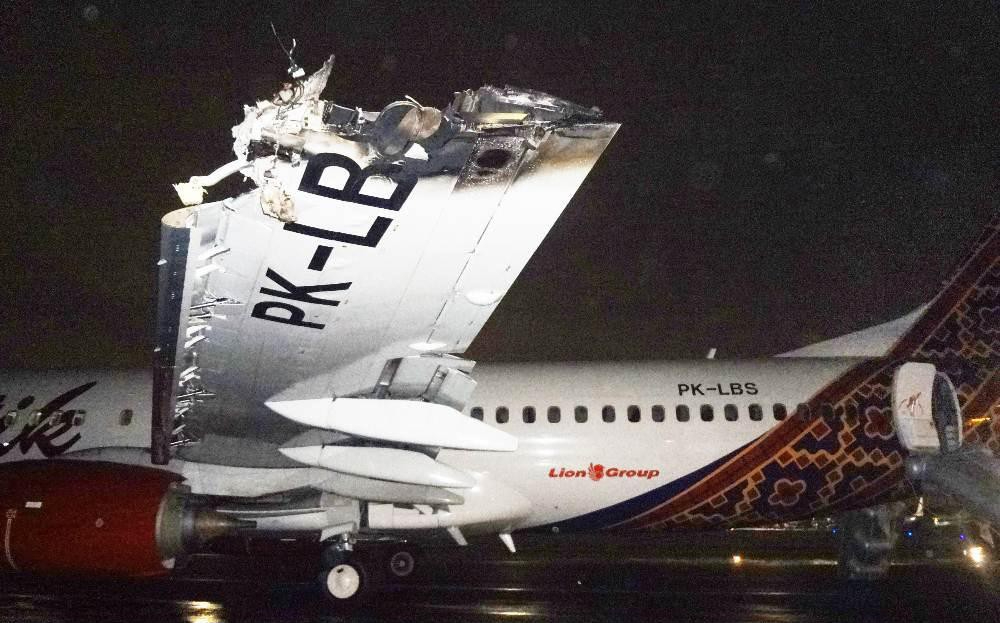
- PK-LBS, the Boeing 737 involved, after evacuation

Accident
- Date: 4 April 2016
- Summary: Ground collision
- Site: Halim Perdanakusuma International Airport, Jakarta, Indonesia; 6°15′58.02″S 106°53′32.03″E
- Total fatalities: 0
- Total survivors: 60

First aircraft
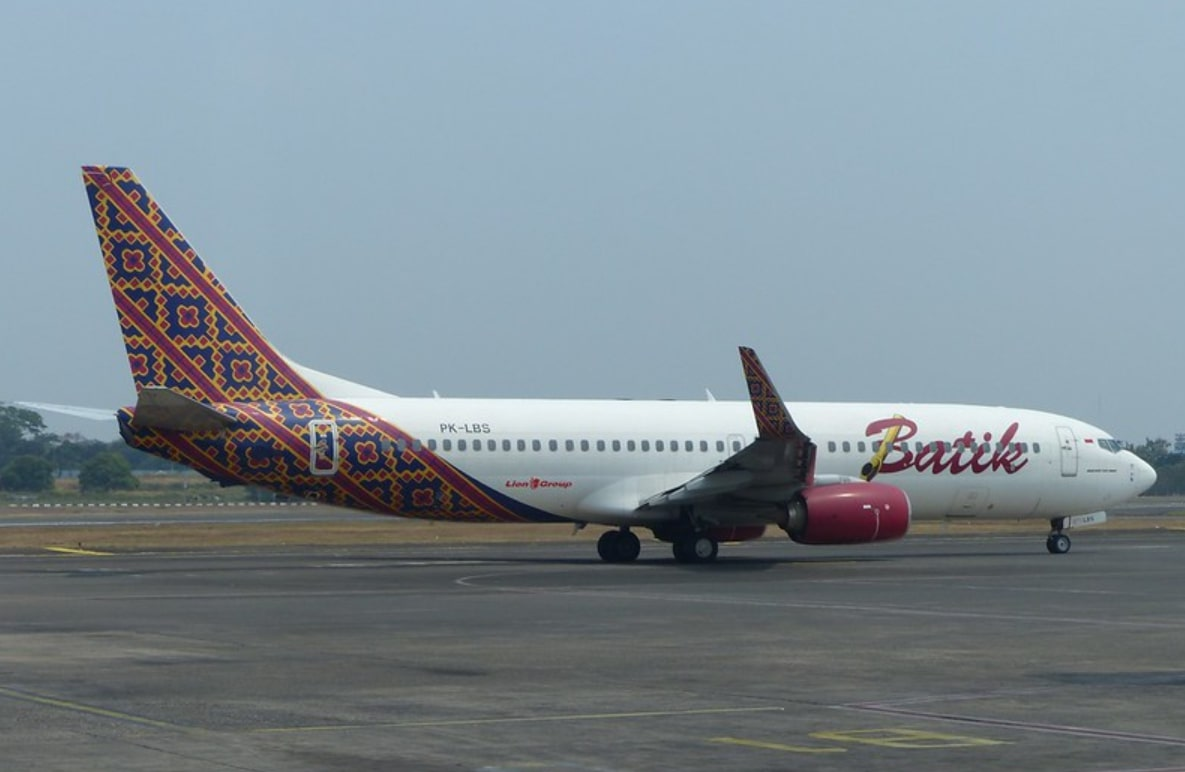
- PK-LBS, the first aircraft involved in the accident, seen in 2019 after being repaired
- Type: Boeing 737-8GP(WL) (Note: The airliner was a Boeing 737-800 model. Boeing assigns a unique code for each company that buys one of its airliners, which is applied as a suffix to the model number at the time the aircraft is built, hence "737-8GP" designates a 737-800 built for Lion Air and its subsidiaries (customer code GP).)
- Operator: Batik Air
- IATA flight No.: ID7703
- ICAO flight No.: BTK7703
- Call sign: BATIK 7703
- Registration: PK-LBS
- Flight origin: Halim Perdanakusuma International Airport, Jakarta, Indonesia
- Destination: Sultan Hasanuddin International Airport, Makassar, Indonesia
- Occupants: 56
- Passengers: 49
- Crew: 7
- Fatalities: 0
- Survivors: 56

Second aircraft
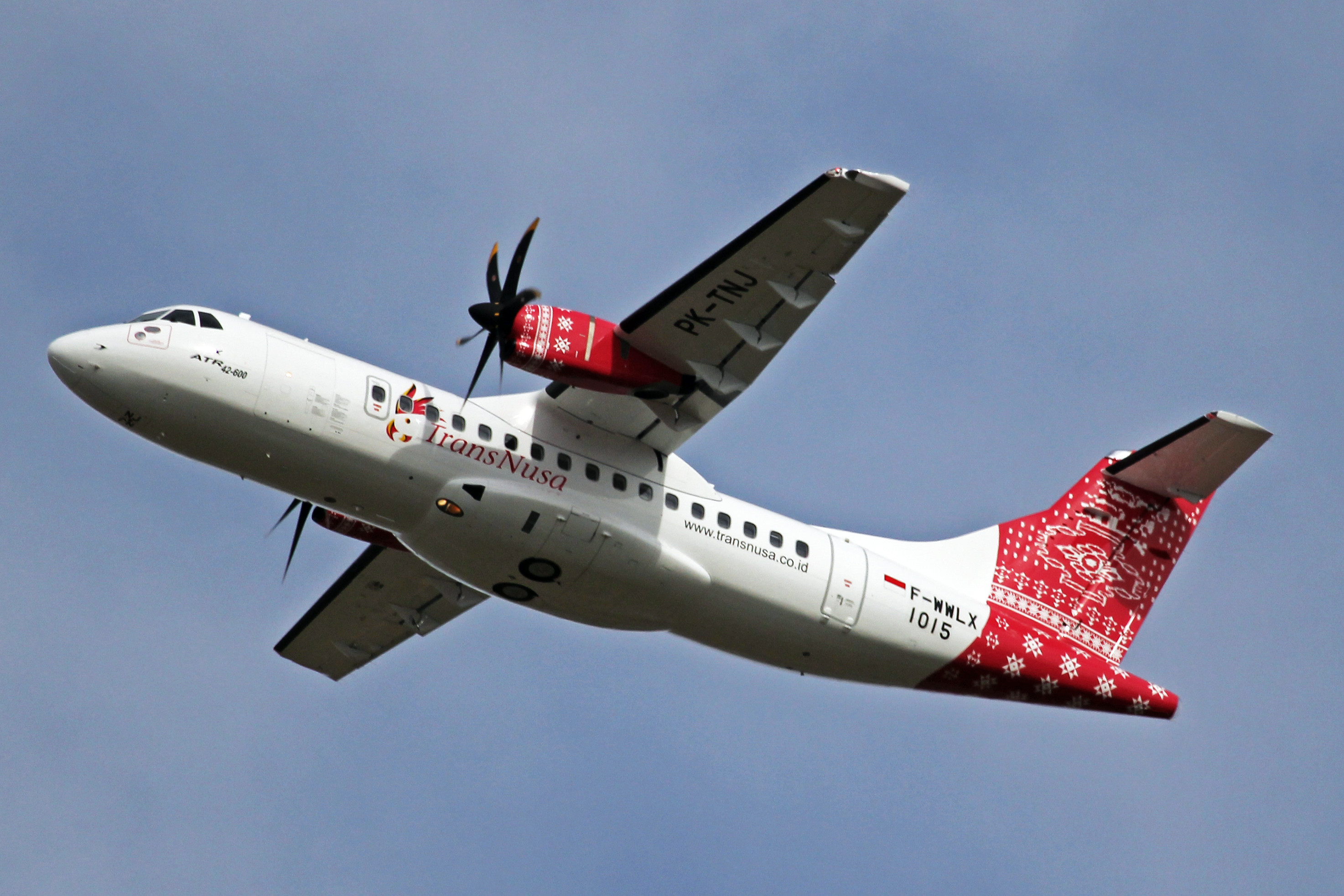
- PK-TNJ, the second aircraft involved in the accident, seen in 2014
- Type: ATR 42-600
- Operator: TransNusa Air Services
- Registration: PK-TNJ
- Occupants: 4
- Crew: 4 (including 2 ground crew)
- Fatalities: 0
- Survivors: 4

On 4 April 2016, Batik Air Flight 7703, a scheduled domestic flight operated by a Boeing 737-800 owned by Lion Air's subsidiary Batik Air, collided during its take-off roll with a TransNusa Air Services ATR 42, which was being towed across the runway. Batik Air Flight 7703 was operating from Halim Perdanakusuma International Airport in Jakarta to Sultan Hasanuddin International Airport in Makassar.

No one was killed or injured in the accident and Angkasa Pura, Indonesia's Airport Management Authority, asked the Indonesian National Transportation Safety Committee (NTSC) to investigate the accident. Minister of Transportation Ignasius Jonan also asked the Director General of Civil Aviation to call the NTSC to investigate the cause of the accident, later criticising Angkasa Pura for the vacuum of power at Halim Perdanakusuma Airport for the past two weeks.

== Background ==
Halim Perdanakusuma International Airport is a commercial and military airport located in East Jakarta. The airport, formerly a military-only airport, became a civilian facility in the 1974, before converting into a military facility again in 1991 following the completion of Soekarno–Hatta International Airport in nearby Tangerang. In 2013, the airport was once again allowed to serve commercial flights. This was due to the congested Soekarno–Hatta International Airport, and this move to change Halim into a joint commercial and military airport would decrease the congestion at Soekarno–Hatta Airport. However, the facilities in the airport were not sufficient for handling commercial airliners. Several politicians criticised the decision to change the operation of Halim Perdanakusuma International Airport from military to joint-use. Several of them asked the government to change the airport back to military; they hoped that the airport would change back into a military airport after completion of the expansion plan in Soekarno–Hatta International Airport.

== Collision ==
Based on a press conference conducted by the Director General of Civil Aviation, the accident occurred at 19:55 WIB. The TransNusa Air Services ATR-42 was being towed to a hangar when Flight 7703 was taking off. The left wing of Flight 7703 sliced off the vertical stabilizer and left outer wing of the ATR 42 and severely damaged Flight 7703's left wing. Flight 7703 then "shook", veered and its wing caught fire, survivors recalling that some passengers didn't know that a collision had happened, and only felt a bump similar to that of a car's tire hitting a hole in the street, while others were crying and "screaming in terror". The witnesses stated that there was a loud bang when the collision happened, several seconds later, they noticed that Flight 7703's left wing was on fire. Survivors recalled the pilots screaming "Fire! Fire!"

The passengers and crew then evacuated the aircraft, the airport fire brigade was activated and extinguished the flames on the wing, then passengers and crew were transported by bus to the airport's passenger terminal. Batik Air later stated that the survivors would be flown by another aircraft to Makassar.

== Aircraft ==
Both aircraft were relatively new, built in 2014 according to an NTSC official. The ATR 42–600 was delivered to TransNusa Air Services in September 2014 and the Boeing 737-800 was delivered to Batik Air in November 2014.

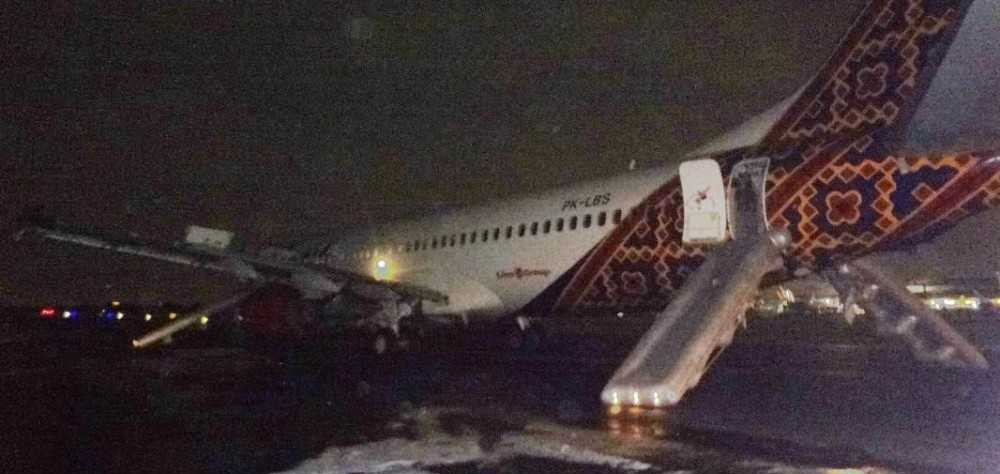
Another view of the aftermath of Flight 7703

== Investigation ==
Minister of Transportation Ignasius Jonan tasked the National Transportation Safety Committee with investigating the cause of the accident. Jonan later criticised Angkasa Pura for the vacuum of power in Halim Perdanakusuma International Airport's management for the preceding two weeks.

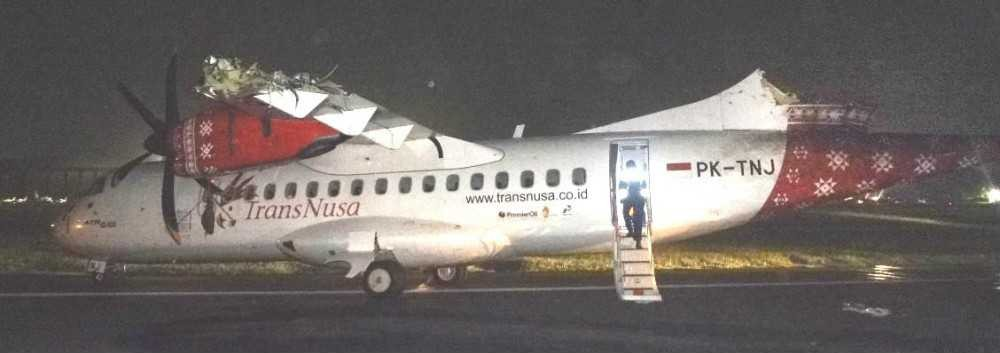
PK-TNJ, the aircraft being towed on the runway, seen after the collision

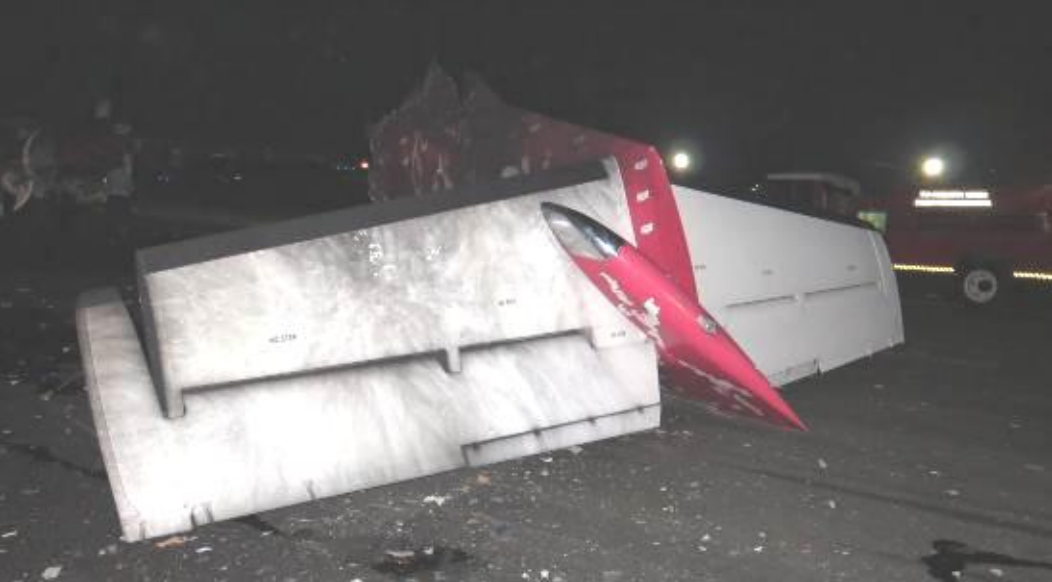
The tail of the ATR 42 in the aftermath

President Director of TransNusa Air Services Juvenile Jodjana held a press conference and stated that the tow truck crew had followed the established procedure for towing the ATR-42. The aircraft was due to park at an apron in the south portion of the airport. Batik Air's spokesman also stated that Flight 7703's crew had followed procedures and had been cleared for take-off by Air Traffic Control (ATC). Investigators had retrieved both black boxes from both aircraft and would analyse the content in their facility (the black box from the ATR would probably reveal nothing as AC electrical power would not have been available). They questioned the crew of Flight 7703, and would speak to the air traffic controller that was on duty. NTSC would also interview the ground crew on the tow truck, investigate the taxi procedure, as well as the maintenance of both aircraft.

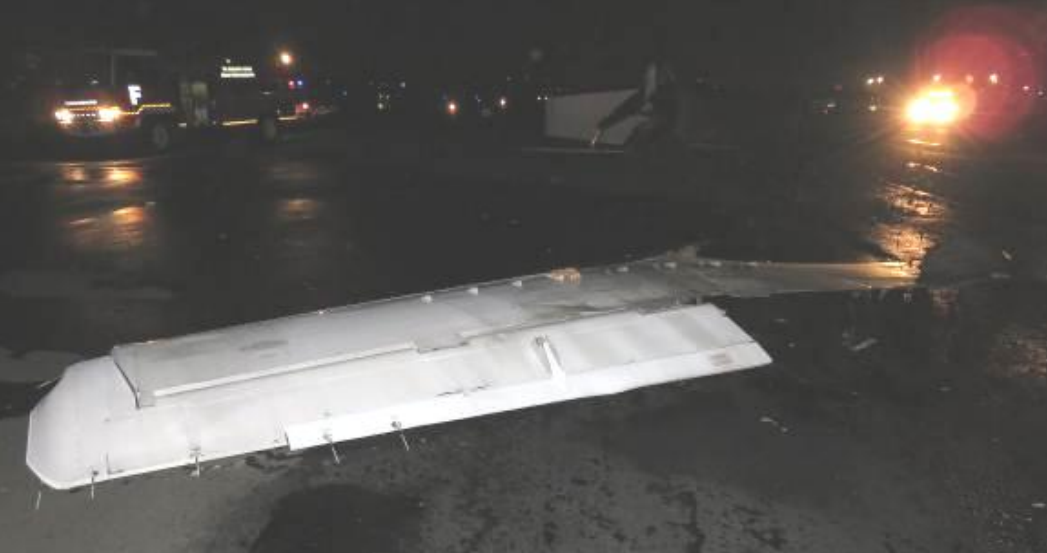
On the moment of collision, the left wing of the ATR 42 detached from the aircraft

After analysing the content of the black box, it was revealed that Batik Air had been cleared for take off while the TransNusa Air Services' ATR 42 was still on the runway. The pilots were aware that a collision was inevitable, and tried to steer the plane to avoid a more severe collision. The NTSC later would transcript the CVR and FDR from both black boxes. Owing to a large number of air accident cases in Indonesia, NTSC stated that it would take up to five months to solve the cause of the collision. The ground handling service in Halim Perdanakusuma International Airport were suspended by the government in response to the accident.

Experts believe that the accident may have been caused by weak co-ordination between ATC, the tow truck crew, and Flight 7703's crew and stated that if Flight 7703 was travelling at high speed, the accident could have been similar to the Tenerife airport disaster in 1977.

The flight recorders, both the cockpit voice recorder and the flight data recorder, from the ATR 42, did not provide any data as there was no electrical power at the time of the accident. Therefore, the NTSC could only retrieve the flight recorders from the Boeing 737, which was supported with AC electrical power at the time. The NTSC stated that because the towed ATR 42 did not have electrical power, none of the lights inside and outside the aircraft were on. Radio communication was also off, therefore the ground crew of the towed ATR 42 could only communicate to the Tower through the handheld radio communication.

Flight 7703 was communicating with the tower on frequency 118.6 MHz. The communications were recorded by ground-based, automatic, voice-recording equipment and the CVR with good quality; while the towed ATR 42 was communicating on frequency 152.7 MHz. The communications in the ATR 42 were not recorded. Based on interview of the ground crew, the towed ATR 42 requested for a reposition to the south apron. When Flight 7703 was pushed back, the towed aircraft was instructed by Halim Tower unit to continue towing and report taxiway "C”.

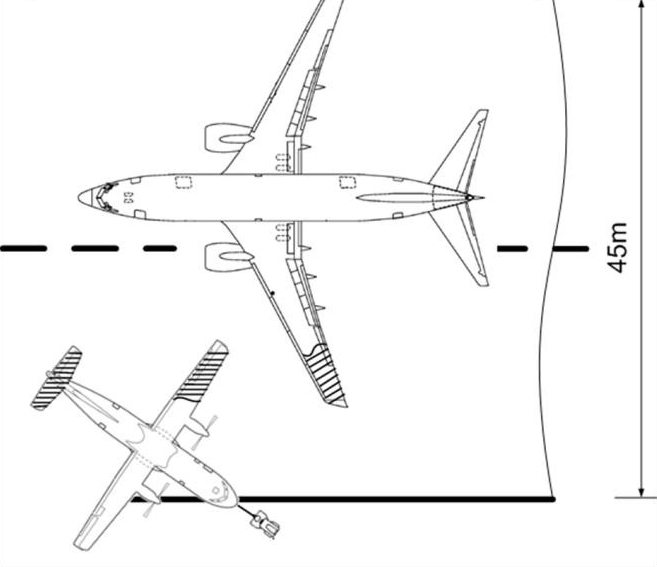
A sketch of the collision between the Boeing 737 and the ATR 42

The absence of lighting on the ATR 42 made it impossible for the air traffic controller to notice the movement of the aircraft, knowing that it was night, aggravated by light shower in Halim Airport. The assistant controller could only see the lights from the towing vehicle. At this point, the towing car driver stated that he saw Flight 7703 was lining up for takeoff then asked to the Halim Tower whether Flight 7703 was initiating the takeoff, but there was no reply from the Halim Tower. Fearing that Flight 7703 would take off, the towing car driver then speeds up the towing and turned to the right side of the runway.

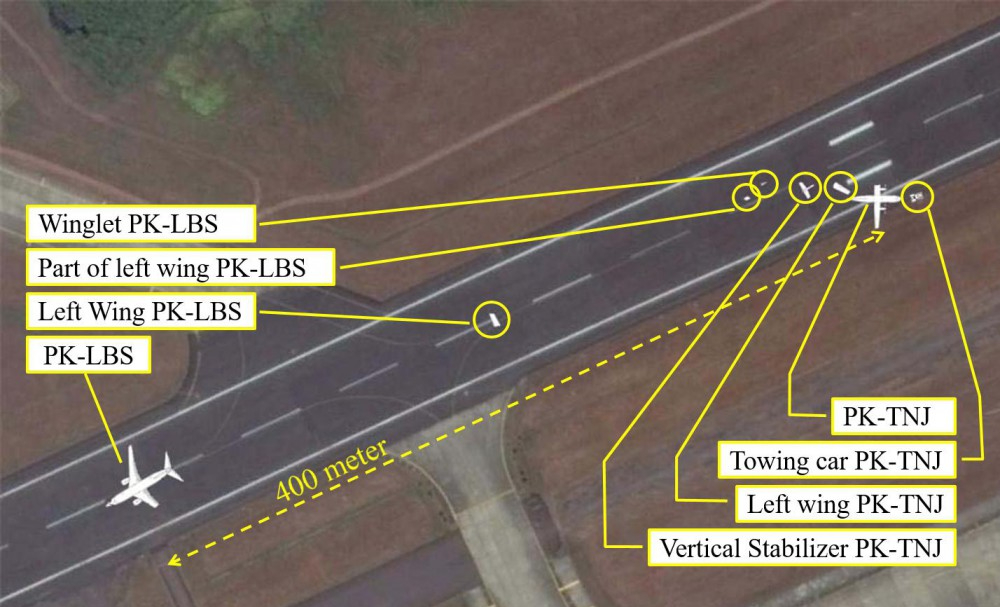
An overview map of both flights

The pilot stated that during line up, the lights surround the turn pad were very bright and affected his forward vision for a short time. It was common practice in Halim to line-up at the turn pad beyond the threshold runway 24. The air traffic controller then observed if there was another aircraft or a vehicle in the runway. Because they didn't see any other aircraft in the runway, Flight 7703 was then cleared for take off by Halim Tower. While taking off, the First Officer then realised that there was an object in the runway (the ATR 42), the Captain quickly took over the control and applied a right rudder input immediately. The Boeing 737-800's winglet then slammed into the ATR 42, at a speed of 80 knots (92 mph; 150 km/h).

At the conclusion of the investigations it was established that the causes of the accident were:

- Lack of coordination between controllers and movements, since flight 7703 and towing were managed by two different controllers and on two different frequencies;
- A misunderstanding of the instruction given to the tow to follow flight 7703 after initially reporting to communicate when the tow was on ring C, which likely contributed to the runway incursion as the towing vehicle driver may have interpreted the instruction as new, making communication no longer necessary once reaching the junction;
- The lighting in the control tower and the reflections on its windows may have caused the loss of visual contact with the tow, which was poorly lit and difficult to identify; furthermore, the assistant controller coordinated other movements, losing contact with the tow. The high lighting of the turnaround area may have contributed to the accident by preventing the pilots from recognizing the obstacle promptly.

== Aftermath ==
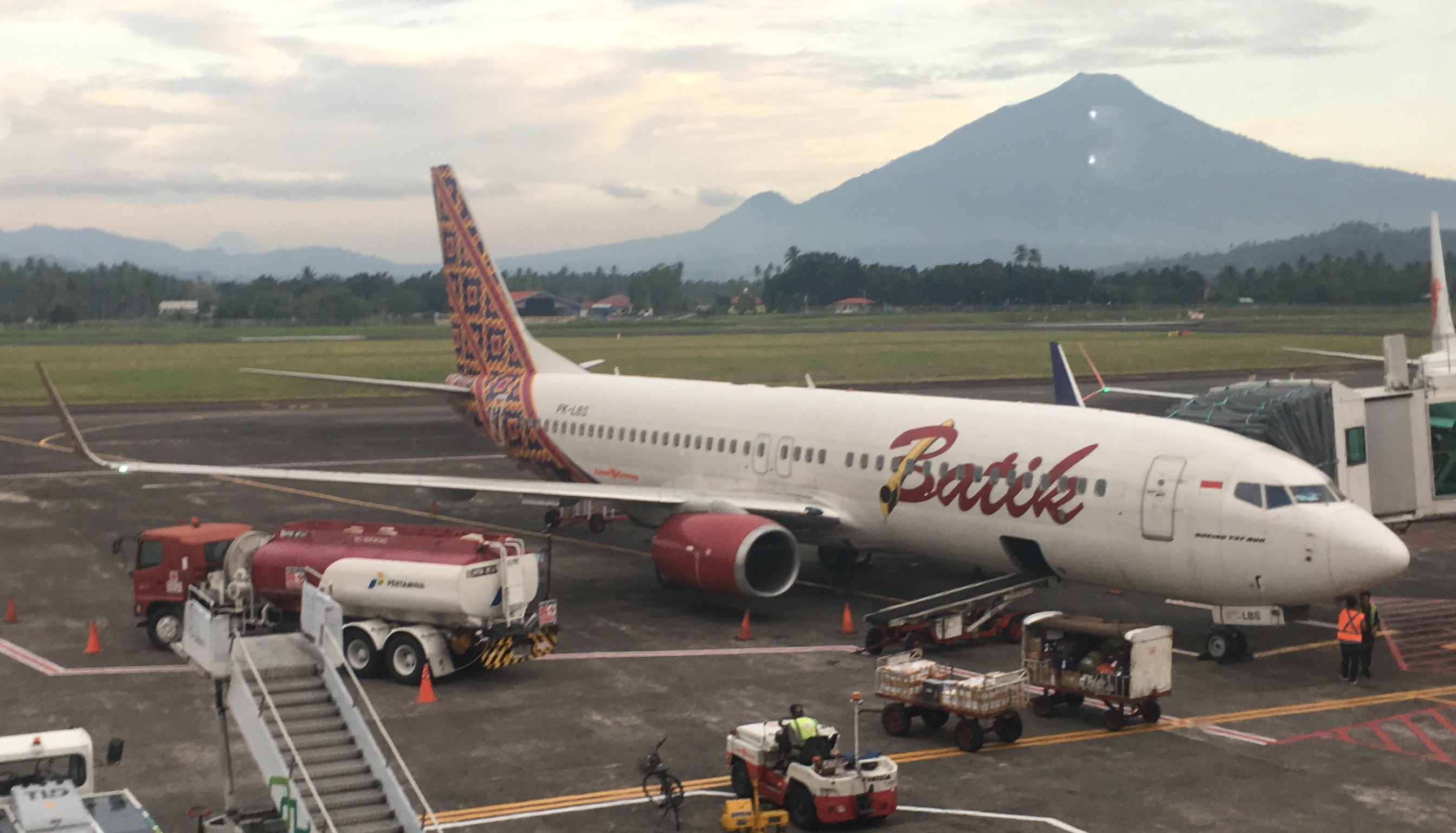
PK-LBS, repaired and returned to service with Batik Air, seen here in September 2018

The TransNusa ATR was damaged beyond repair and was written off, losing its vertical stabilizer and left outer wing. The Batik Air 737 suffered structural and fire damage to its left wing and could also possibly have been a hull loss, but the 737 was repaired and returned to normal service with Batik Air in September 2016.

Survivors of the crash later received a "compensation" flight from Batik Air. However, as most passengers were "too traumatized" by the crash, most of them cancelled their flights and demanded a refund from the airline. Additionally the 3 ATC crew; controller, assistant controller and supervisor, were traumatised by the accident.

As the result of the crash, Halim Perdanakusuma Airport was closed until 22:00 WIB. Several flights that were due to land at Halim were diverted to the nearby Soekarno–Hatta International Airport in Tangerang, Banten, including five Citilink flights. The aircraft was evacuated and the runway was cleared of debris. The airport was reopened at midnight on 5 April and five flights, including one with a 200-strong Indonesian Army mission to Darfur, South Sudan, took off from the airport.

The Director General of Civil Aviation, Surpastyo, stated that passengers that were delayed due to the collision must be given compensation, as he said that all airlines have a Standard Operating Procedure (SOP) to treat affected passengers favourably. AirlineRatings.com, an airliner review website, dubbed Batik Air as the most unsafe airline of 2016 due to this accident.

== See also ==
- 2009 Makhachkala Il-76 collision, a ground collision between two Ilyushin Il-76.
- 2001 Linate Airport runway collision, a ground collision between an MD-87 and a Cessna Citation CJ2.
- Tenerife airport disaster, the deadliest runway collision in history, involving two Boeing 747s.
