= 1990 Guangzhou Baiyun airport collisions =

Aircraft hijacking and crash in China

1990 Guangzhou Baiyun airport collisions Xiamen Airlines Flight 8301 · CAAC Flight 3523 · China Southwest Airlines Flight 4305
- The wreckage of Flight 3523

Hijacking
- Date: 2 October 1990
- Summary: Hijacking leading to ground collision
- Site: Guangzhou Baiyun International Airport Guangzhou, China; 23.1872°N 113.2680°E
- Total fatalities: 128 (including the hijacker)
- Total injuries: 53
- Total survivors: 97

First aircraft
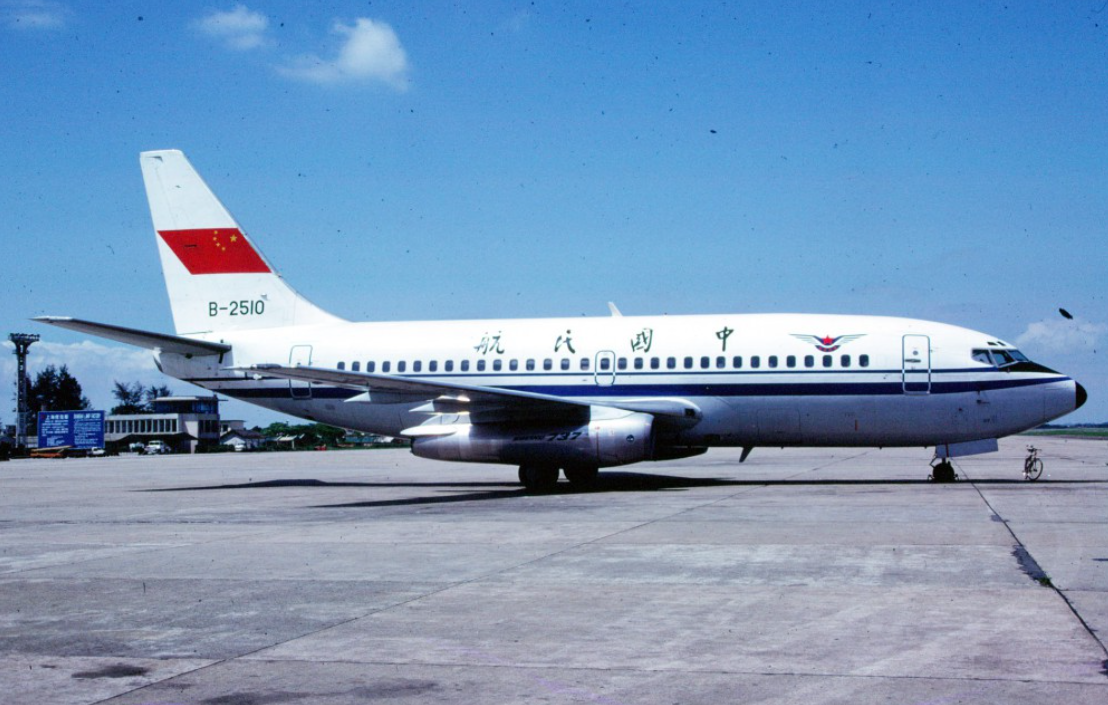
- B-2510, the Xiamen Airlines Boeing 737-247 involved the collision, seen in 1985
- Type: Boeing 737-247
- Operator: Xiamen Airlines
- IATA flight No.: MF8301
- ICAO flight No.: CXA8301
- Call sign: XIAMEN AIR 8301
- Registration: B-2510
- Flight origin: Xiamen Gaoqi Airport, China
- Destination: Guangzhou Baiyun; International Airport, China
- Occupants: 102 (including the hijacker)
- Passengers: 93 (including the hijacker)
- Crew: 9
- Fatalities: 82 (including the hijacker)
- Injuries: 18
- Survivors: 20

Second aircraft
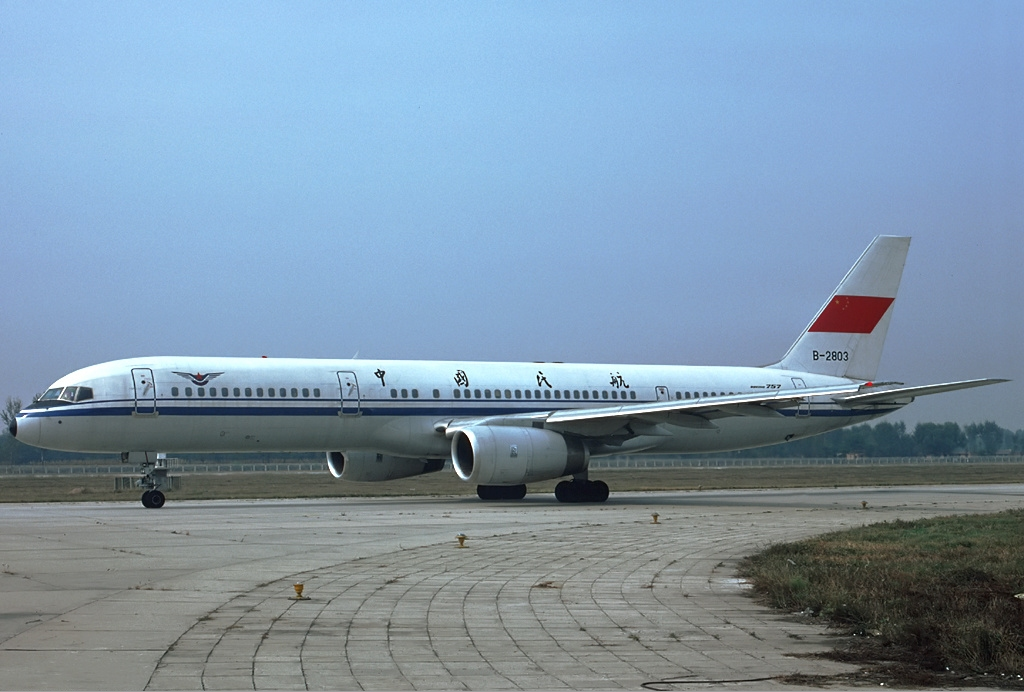
- A CAAC Boeing 757-21B, similar to the aircraft involved in the collision
- Type: Boeing 757-21B
- Operator: CAAC
- IATA flight No.: CA3523
- ICAO flight No.: CCA3523
- Call sign: CAAC 3523
- Registration: B-2812
- Flight origin: Guangzhou Baiyun; International Airport, China
- Destination: Shanghai Hongqiao Airport, China
- Occupants: 122
- Passengers: 110
- Crew: 12
- Fatalities: 46
- Injuries: 34
- Survivors: 76

Third aircraft
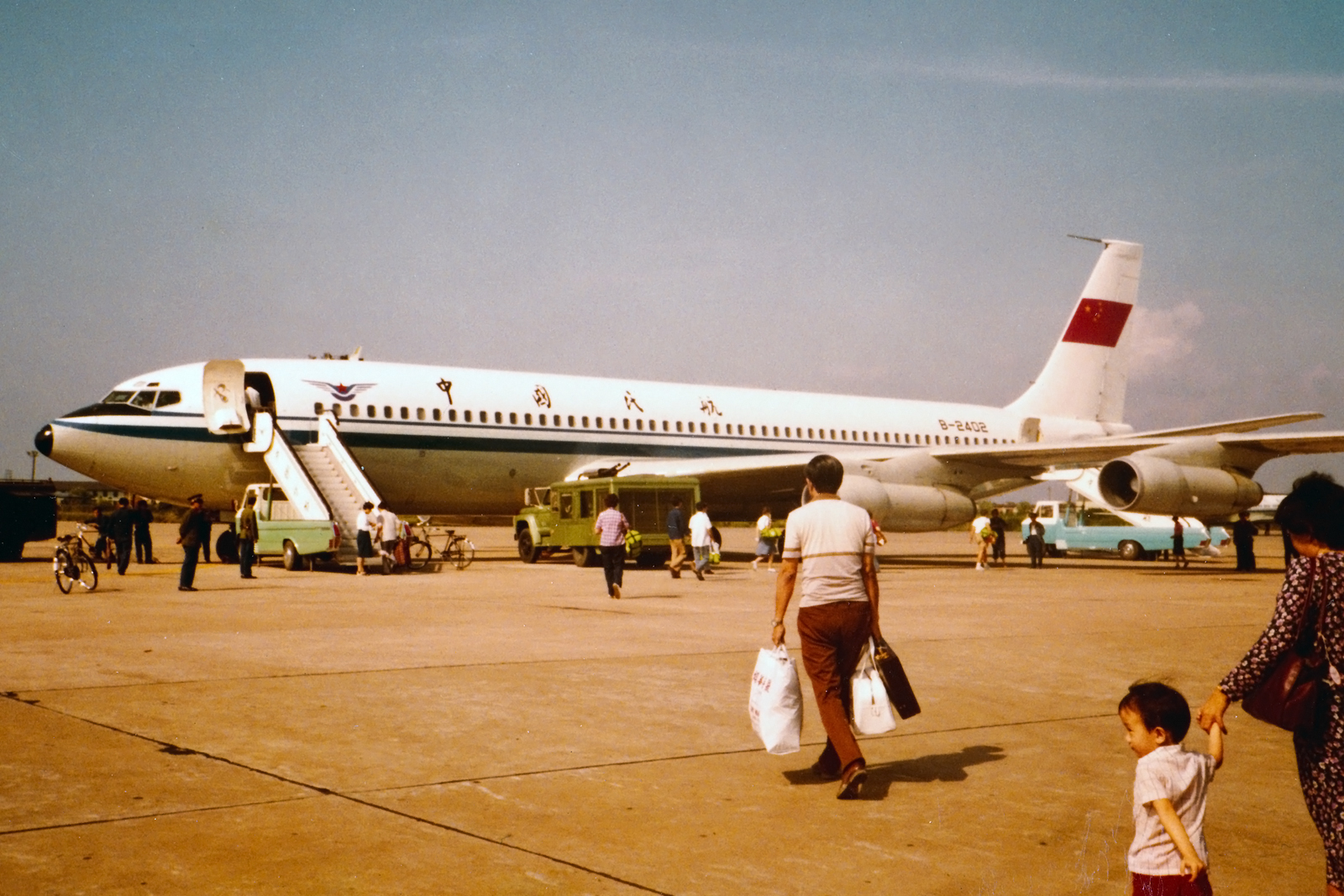
- B-2402, the China Southwest Airlines Boeing 707-3J6B involved in the collision, photographed in 1983
- Type: Boeing 707-3J6B
- Operator: China Southwest Airlines
- IATA flight No.: SZ4305
- ICAO flight No.: CXN4305
- Call sign: CHINA SOUTHWEST 4305
- Registration: B-2402
- Flight origin: Chengdu Shuangliu Airport, China
- Destination: Guangzhou Baiyun; International Airport, China
- Occupants: 1
- Crew: 1
- Fatalities: 0
- Injuries: 1
- Survivors: 1

External image
- Image of aircraft B-2402 at the time of delivery

On 2 October 1990, a hijacked Boeing 737-200, operating Xiamen Airlines Flight 8301, collided with two other aircraft at the old Guangzhou Baiyun International Airport while attempting to land. The hijacked aircraft struck parked China Southwest Airlines Flight 4305 first, a Boeing 707, inflicting only minor damage, but then collided with CAAC Flight 3523, a Boeing 757 waiting to take off, flipping onto its back. A total of 128 people were killed, including seven of nine crew members and 75 of 93 passengers on Flight 8301 and 46 of 110 passengers on Flight 3523, making this incident the deadliest aircraft hijacking prior to the September 11, 2001 attacks.

== Aircraft involved ==
The three aircraft involved in the incident were the hijacked Xiamen Airlines Flight 8301, and two planes parked on the apron at Baiyun Airport: China Southwest Airlines Flight 4305 and CAAC Flight 3523.

Xiamen Airlines Flight 8301 was operated with a Boeing 737-247. The aircraft registration was B-2510, with serial number 23189/1072. This aircraft had previously been hijacked on May 12, 1988, by Zhang Qingguo and Long Guiyun, armed with knives, to Taiwan's Taichung Ching-Chuan-Kang Airport, becoming the first aircraft from mainland China hijacked to Taiwan.

On the day of the incident, Flight 8301 departed from Xiamen Gaoqi International Airport en route to the original Guangzhou Baiyun International Airport. There were 93 passengers and 9 crew members on board.

China Southwest Airlines Flight 4305 was operated with a Boeing 707-3J6B, registration B-2402, serial number 20714/869. It first flew in 1973. In 1983, it was transferred from the Civil Aviation Administration of China's Beijing Regional Administration to the Shanghai Regional Administration, and later to the Chengdu Regional Administration in 1985. On November 3, 1989, it was involved in an attempted hijacking while operating a flight from Harbin to Guangzhou. On the day of the incident, the aircraft had recently landed at Baiyun Airport from Chengdu Shuangliu International Airport. All passengers had disembarked, and the crew had left except for one person who stayed on board for cleaning.

CAAC Flight 3523 was operated with a Boeing 757-21B, registration B-2812, serial number 24758/282. It first flew in 1990 and was the newest of the three aircraft. On the day of the incident, it was scheduled to fly to Shanghai Hongqiao International Airport. At the time of the incident, all 110 passengers and 12 crew members were already on board.

== Hijacking of Flight 8301 ==
Xiamen Airlines Flight 8301, operated on a Boeing 737-200, was hijacked by Jiang Xiaofeng (simplified Chinese: 蒋晓峰; traditional Chinese: 蔣曉峰; pinyin: Jiǎng Xiǎofēng), born 11 August 1969 in Linli County, Hunan, on Tuesday, 2 October 1990. Jiang, a 21-year-old purchasing agent, was seeking political asylum in Taiwan.

Jiang was once arrested for theft in September 1988. While working as a purchasing agent in 1990, he fled on 13 July with RMB 17,000 which was given to him for purchasing goods for his company. He was wanted by the police at the time of the hijacking.

On 29 September, Jiang checked-in at a hotel near the Xiamen borders. The next day, he booked a seat on the flight he would go on to hijack. Jiang checked out of the hotel around 6 a.m. on the morning of 2 October and headed to the airport. He was seen wearing a black suit and black dress shoes, carrying a black suitcase, and holding plastic roses. Jiang was the last to board the plane. He was sitting at seat 16D.

On the day of the incident, Xiamen Airlines Flight 8301 began boarding at 6:15 a.m. and took off on schedule at 6:57 a.m. Around 7:20 a.m., passenger Jiang Xiaofeng left his seat and rushed toward the cockpit holding a black plastic box about the size of a cigarette pack. He forcefully pounded on the cockpit door and opened it—it had not been locked at the time—and barged in. Once inside, he displayed wires in his hand and claimed he was carrying 7 kilograms of explosives, demanding that the flight be diverted to Taiwan Taoyuan. He threatened to "go down together" if his demands were not met.

He then ordered that everyone except the captain, Cen Longyu, leave the cockpit. The captain complied and cleared the cockpit. Meanwhile, cockpit audio was transmitted to the control tower via radio communication systems. Upon confirming the hijacking, the Civil Aviation Administration's Central South Regional Bureau authorized the aircraft to land at any airport—domestic or international. Simultaneously, Guangzhou Baiyun International Airport was shut down, and all takeoffs and landings were suspended.

In the cabin, flight attendants informed passengers that the plane had been hijacked. About 20 minutes later, with the hijacker's permission, a crew member lowered the curtain between the cockpit and the cabin, and over 20 passengers from the front rows were relocated to the rear of the aircraft. According to survivors, the crew attempted to determine whether the hijacker's suitcase contained explosives. After discussion, a female flight attendant retrieved the suitcase from the overhead compartment, but since it was locked, they ultimately did not open it.

As the aircraft entered Guangdong airspace, it circled above Foshan Shadi Airport before proceeding toward Guangzhou. Upon arrival, it flew in a holding pattern approximately 300 meters above Baiyun Airport. At 8:34 a.m., the captain radioed the Guangzhou control tower, reporting insufficient fuel and requesting permission to divert to Kai Tak Airport in Hong Kong for refueling before continuing to Taiwan. Although the Guangzhou Civil Aviation Administration and control tower approved the request, the hijacker refused to land in Hong Kong and threatened to detonate the aircraft if forced to do so. No further communications were received from the flight after that. The pilot circled Guangzhou, attempting to reason with Jiang. He was eventually forced to land the plane when it ran dangerously low on fuel. Reports from the official Xinhua News Agency did not explain why the pilot did not accede to Jiang's demand.

At 9:04 a.m., Flight 8301 landed at Baiyun Airport. After taxiing for approximately 1,080 meters, Jiang managed to wrestle control of the aircraft from the pilot, causing the aircraft to veer off the runway to the right and head toward the apron. The plane briefly lifted off again, with its nose rising, but the tail struck a ground service vehicle. It then collided with a parked China Southwest Airlines Boeing 707-3J6B which had just arrived from Chengdu as China Southwest Airlines Flight 4305, shearing off the nose of the aircraft and slightly injuring the pilot, who was in the cockpit at the time. The aircraft continued forward and struck CAAC Flight 3523, a Boeing 757 waiting to depart to Shanghai, hitting the upper fuselage and splitting it into two parts, causing the left engine to detach. After traveling another 300 meters eastward, the Xiamen Airlines plane crashed to the ground, rolling and breaking apart into four major sections.

All three aircraft caught fire following the collisions. According to official accounts, firefighters stationed nearby brought the flames under control within 12 seconds and fully extinguished them within two minutes, successfully rescuing 54 passengers. Over ten hours after the incident, the Guangzhou emergency rescue team completed debris removal from the airport. The airport resumed operations the following day.

== Passengers and fatalities ==
Fatalities by aircraft
Flight	Passengers	Crew	Total
Xiamen Airlines Flight 8301	75	7	82
CAAC Flight 3523	46	0	46
China Southwest Airlines Flight 4305	0	0	0
Total	121	7	128

The collisions were the deadliest aviation incident of 1990. Among the victims were not only passengers from mainland China, but also individuals from the United States, Sweden, Japan, Taiwan, Hong Kong, and Macau.

On the Xiamen Airlines Boeing 737, seven of the nine crew members and 75 (including 30 Taiwanese, four people from Hong Kong, one from Macau, and one American) of the 93 passengers died. On the CAAC 757 aircraft all 12 crew members survived and 46 of 110 passengers died. Of the passengers who died in the 757, eight were from Taiwan. A total of 128 people died in the disaster, including Jiang, the hijacker of the Xiamen Airlines aircraft. This disaster also marked the first hull loss and fatal disaster involving a Boeing 757.

Of the 46 fatalities aboard the CAAC flight, most died instantly, while five others succumbed to injuries after being taken to the hospital. Among the passengers was a tour group from Taiwan consisting of ten members—all of whom perished. The crash resulted in the deaths of 30 Taiwanese travelers, making it the deadliest incident involving tourists from Taiwan since the Republic of China allowed visits to mainland China in the late 1980s.

A Swedish businessman on board was among the few survivors. None of the 12 crew members on the CAAC flight were killed, as they had been monitoring the hijacking situation from the cockpit via radio communications prior to the collision.

The China Southwest Airlines aircraft sustained the fewest casualties, with only one crew member—who had stayed behind to clean the cabin—injured. Additionally, five passengers from Hong Kong and two from Macau were killed in the incident.

== Investigation and aftermath ==
At 2:10 p.m. on the day of the crash, then-Premier Li Peng flew from Beijing to Guangzhou to assess the situation, inspect the scene, and visit injured passengers at the hospital. A post-crash investigation team was quickly formed by the central government, and a local task force was also established to handle the aftermath, led by Chen Kaizhi.

The remains of Captain Cen Longyu and the hijacker, Jiang Xiaofeng, were found in the cockpit wreckage. Although Jiang had claimed to be carrying explosives during the hijacking, an autopsy later confirmed that he had no such materials on his body.

According to a report by The New York Times, Chinese authorities had tried to deceive the hijacker into believing that the aircraft had been diverted to an international airport, while actually instructing the pilot to land at Baiyun Airport instead of flying to Taiwan as demanded.

On October 10, officials released the preliminary investigation results. Authorities acknowledged procedural failures in handling the hijacking and announced that several lower-level employees at the airport and involved airlines would be dismissed. However, the report did not explain why no evacuation was carried out for passengers aboard nearby aircraft during the 40 minutes of circling before the crash.

== Aftermath ==
Since the incident occurred during the Beijing Asian Games, authorities were concerned about the possibility of further explosions or hijackings disrupting the event. As a result, security measures at airports nationwide were significantly tightened to prevent similar incidents.

The crash prompted a change in the government's early approach to hijacking incidents. Instead of encouraging crew and passengers to confront hijackers directly, the new priority became the protection of passengers and aircraft safety.

All three aircraft were declared total losses due to severe damage. The CAAC Boeing 757, insured by a Guangzhou-based insurance company, received a compensation payout of US$55.599 million (approximately RMB 290 million at the time).

The only surviving intact wreckage from the crash includes one engine, one tire, and the left landing gear. These parts are currently preserved and displayed at an aviation museum located east of Guangzhou Baiyun International Airport for public viewing.

== See also ==
- Balkan Bulgarian Airlines Flight 013 – 1983 aircraft hijacking in Bulgaria
- Ethiopian Airlines Flight 961 – 1996 aircraft hijacking and crash in the Comoros
