= Guangzhou Baiyun International Airport (1933–2004) =

Former airport of Guangzhou, Guangdong, China (1934–2004)

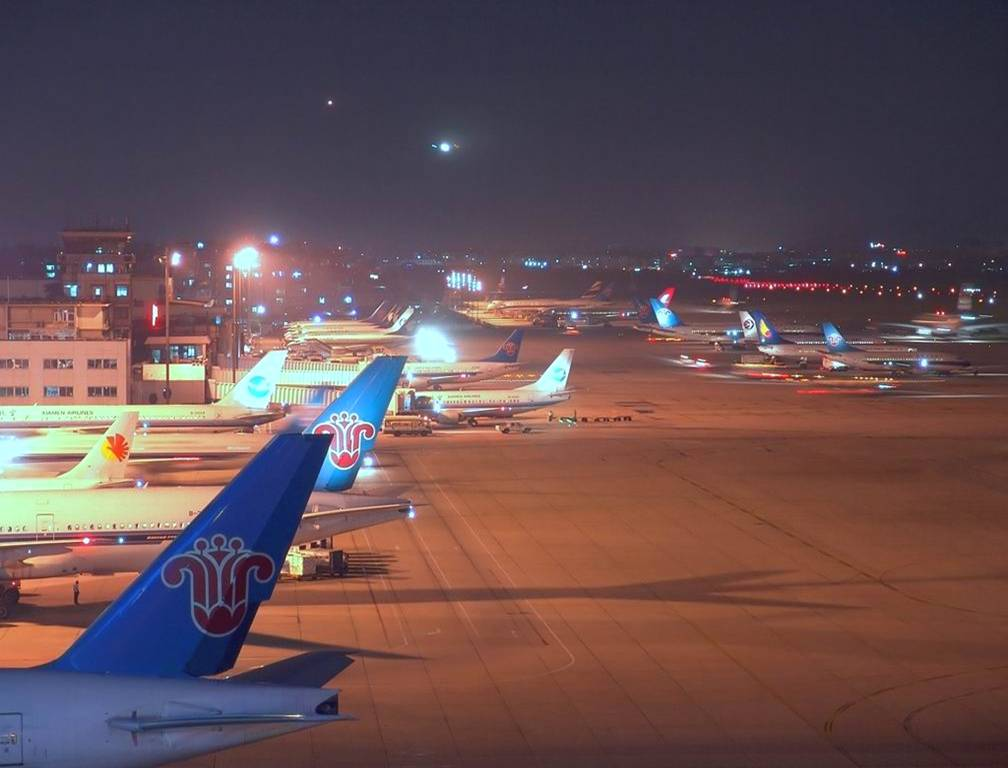
- IATA: ~~CAN~~; ICAO: ~~ZGGG~~

Summary
- Airport type: Defunct
- Operator: Guangzhou Baiyun International Airport Co. Ltd.
- Serves: Pearl River Delta
- Location: Baiyun, Guangzhou, Guangdong, China
- Opened: November 1933
- Closed: 5 August 2004
- Hub for: CAAC Airlines (1952–1988); China Southern Airlines (1988–2004)
- Elevation AMSL: 2 ft (0.61 m)
- Coordinates: 23°11′14″N 113°16′5″E

Map
- Location within Guangdong

Runways
Direction	Length		Surface
Direction	m	ft	Surface
03/21	3,380	11,089	Paved (Closed)

Guangzhou Baiyun International Airport
- Simplified Chinese: 广州白云国际机场
- Traditional Chinese: 廣州白雲國際機場
Transcriptions
Standard Mandarin
- Hanyu Pinyin: Guǎngzhōu Báiyún Guójì Jīchǎng
Yue: Cantonese
- Jyutping: gwong^{2}zau^{1} baak^{6}wan^{4} Gwok^{3}zai^{3} Gei^{1}coeng^{4}

Guangzhou Baiyun International Airport (IATA: ~~CAN~~, ICAO: ~~ZGGG~~) was an airport that served Guangzhou, the capital of South Central China's Guangdong province. Originally opened in 1933, it was one of the first civil airports in China, but was closed on 5 August 2004 when all services were transferred to the new airport of the same name, 23 km (14 mi) to the north.

== History ==
The airport started construction in 1932 and opened in November 1933. During the Canton Operation, the Japanese Navy invaded the airport and expanded the runway. In 1963, the People's Liberation Army Air Force moved away from the airport, making the airport only for public use. The name of the airport is changed to "Baiyun" named from nearby Baiyun Mountain ("Baiyun" in Chinese means "white cloud").

From 1964 to 1967, it underwent a comprehensive expansion, adding an area of 725,300 square meters (7,807,000 sq ft), and extending the runway to 2,500 meters (8,202 ft 1 in) from 2,000 meters (6,561 ft 8 in) before it had the conditions of further navigation with foreign countries.

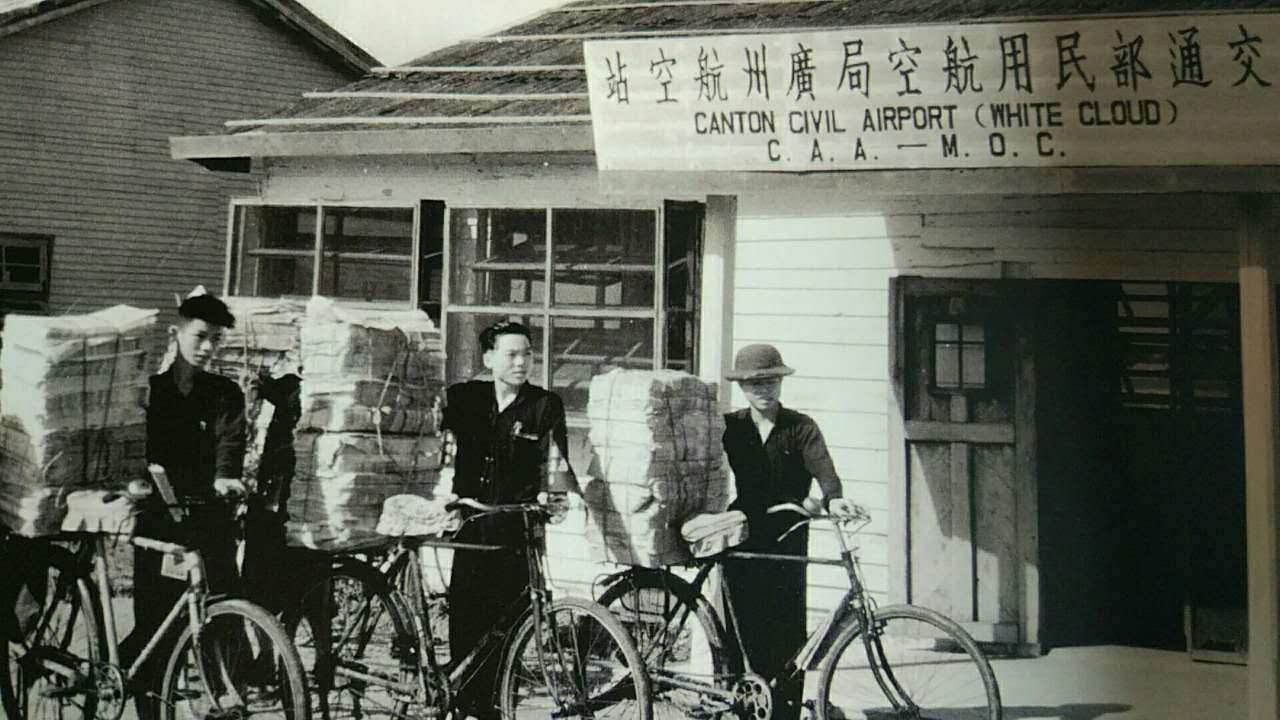
Canton Civil Airport (White Cloud) in 1947.

In the 1980s, the airport renovated and expanded facilities such as oil storage depots, aprons, terminal buildings, boarding bridges, and maintenance hangars to meet the standards of international first-class airports. After the reform and opening up, Baiyun Airport had developed rapidly. Its passenger capacity, takeoffs and landings had ranked first in mainland China for eight consecutive years. After several expansions, it was still far from meeting its demand. It was imperative to choose a new location to build a new airport.

In 1992, the airport underwent civil aviation system reform, and the airport operated as an independent economic entity.

By 2002, the passenger throughput of the old Guangzhou Baiyun International Airport had reached 16,014,400 passengers, and the cargo and mail throughput reached 592,600 tons.

Due to the expansion of Guangzhou, the airport was surrounded by high-rise buildings and was unable to expand further to meet passengers' needs. Instead, the new Baiyun airport was built and opened on 5 August 2004, and the old airport was closed.

== Former airlines and destinations ==
There are often ferry international flights to Hong Kong, even before its economic open up. Similar to its new airport, it had served a variety of domestic or foreign international airlines back in the 1980s and 1990s such as Pakistan International Airlines, Garuda Indonesia, Air France, Japan Air System, Japan Airlines, All Nippon Airways, Malaysia Airlines, Cathay Pacific, Lufthansa, Philippine Airlines, Thai Airways International, Dragonair, Singapore Airlines, Aeroflot, Baikal Airlines, Royal Air Cambodge, Batavia Air, and nearly every domestic airlines.

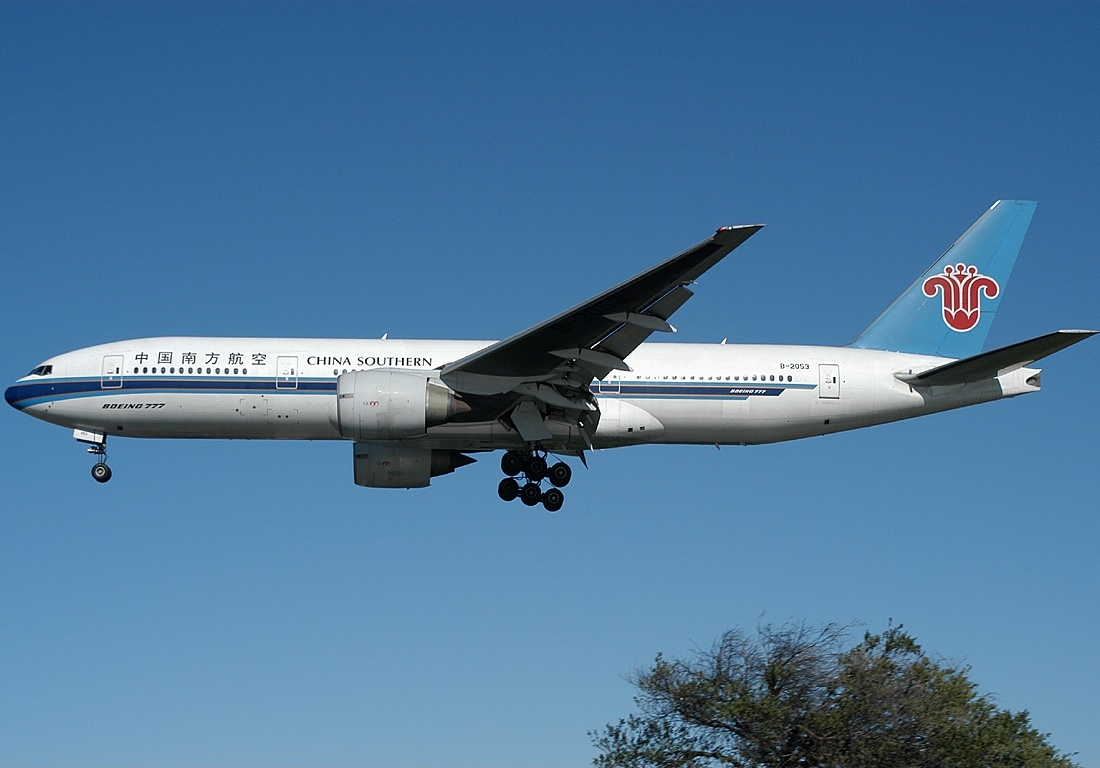
Boeing 777-200 from China Southern Airlines approaching Baiyun Airport in 2003. At that time, the airport was the most important hub of China Southern Airlines.

== Legacy ==
The former terminal of the airport is being converted into a large shopping mall. The northern portion of the former airport is being turned into a provincial- and city-level functional area integrating conference services. The southern portion will be converted into Guangzhou's secondary center integrating retail, sports facilities, business, and cultural activities.

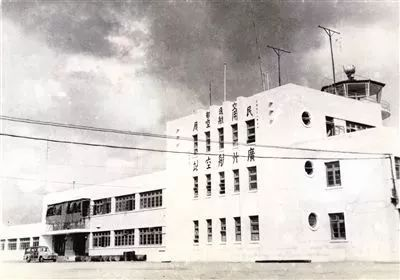
The Airport Terminal in 1949, shortly before the Communist Revolution

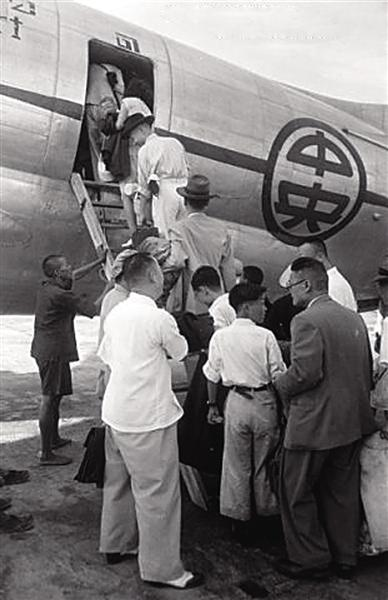
Central Air Transport in Canton Civil Airport (1948)

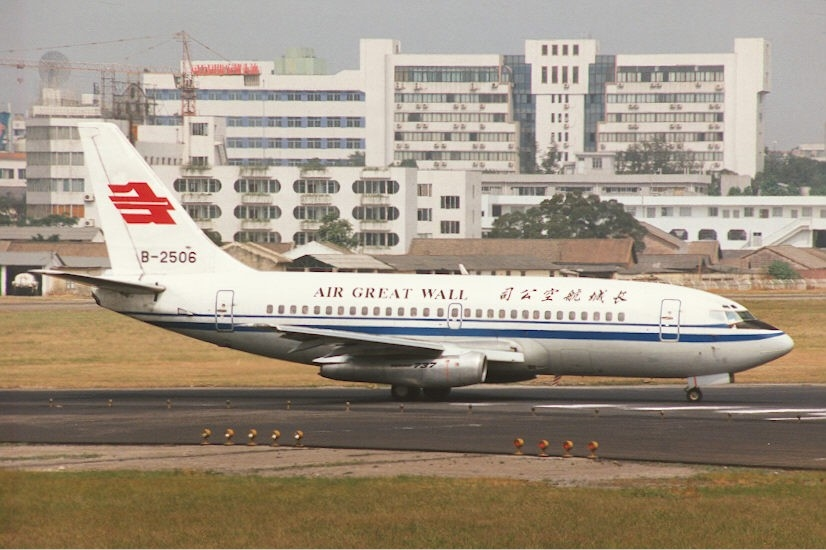
Air Great Wall Boeing 737-200 about to take off at Baiyun Airport in 1996. Note that the airport had been surrounded by high-rise buildings and mountains.

== Incidents and accidents ==
- On the 24 December 1982, CAAC Flight 2311, an Ilyushin Il-18B was destroyed by fire after landing at the airport. Twenty-five of the 69 people on board were killed.
- On 2 October 1990, Xiamen Airlines Flight 8301, a Boeing 737-247, was hijacked on route to Guangzhou from Xiamen. While landing at the airport, it sideswiped a parked China Southwest Airlines Boeing 707-3J6B, and crashed into a taxiing China Southern Airlines Boeing 757-21B; of the total 225 occupants involving the aircraft, 97 survived.

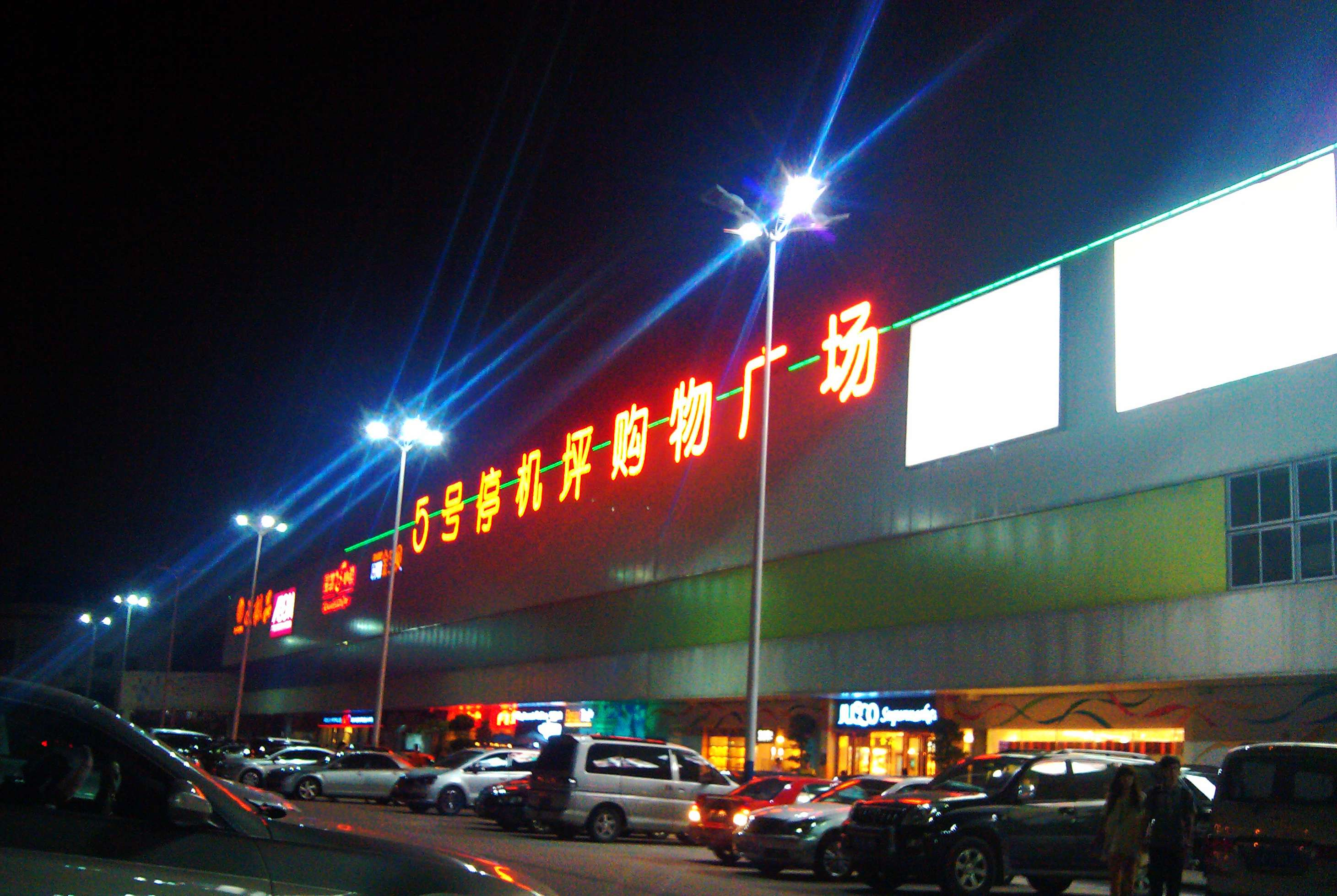
The former Baiyun airport in 2012, now operating as G5 Guangzhou Shopping Mall.

== See also ==
- List of defunct international airports
- List of airports in Guangdong province, from 1911-current (Zh-Wiki)
