= 1994 in aviation =

This is a list of aviation-related events from 1994.

== Events ==
- OceanAir – the future Azores Airlines – suspends operations. It will resume flight operations in April 1998 as SATA International.

=== January ===
- 20 January – Qatar Airways begins operations.

=== February ===
- 1 February – The Government of Colombia's Administrative Department of Civil Aeronautics is abolished. Simultaneously, the Special Administrative Unit of Civil Aeronautics begins operations, taking over the former department's role as Colombia′s national civil aviation authority.
- 6 February – In the wake of the Markale massacre the previous day in Sarajevo, Bosnia and Herzegovina, United Nations Secretary-General Boutros Boutros-Ghali formally requests that the North Atlantic Treaty Organization (NATO) confirm that it would carry out air strikes against Army of Republika Srpska positions around Sarajevo immediately.
- 9 February – NATO authorizes the Commander of Allied Forces Southern Europe, United States Navy Admiral Jeremy Boorda, to launch air strikes against Army of Republika Srpska artillery and mortar positions in and around Sarajevo that the United Nations Protection Force (UNPROFOR) determined were responsible for attacks against civilian targets.
- 28 February – In an incident near Banja Luka in Bosnia and Herzegovina, the first combat operation in the history of NATO takes place when two United States Air Force F-16C Fighting Falcons operating in NATO's Operation Deny Flight – enforcement of a no-fly zone over Bosnia and Herzegovina – engage six Republika Srpska Air Force J-21 Jastreb light attack aircraft which had just bombed Novi Travnik, Bosnia and Herzegovina, shooting down four of them.

=== March ===
- Alaska Airlines retires its last Boeing 727.
- 7 March – The Japanese Nihon Aero Student Group's Yuri I makes the second human-powered helicopter flight in history and the first since December 1989, setting an endurance record of 19.46 seconds at Nihon University.
- 12 March – The United Nations Protection Force (UNPROFOR) makes its first request for NATO close air support in Bosnia and Herzegovina, but a number of delays associated with the approval process prevent NATO aircraft from carrying out a strike.
- 17 March – Armenian forces shoot down an Islamic Republic of Iran Air Force C-130E Hercules carrying Iranian embassy personnel from Tehran to Moscow near Ballıca in the Armenian-occupied Nagorno-Karabakh region of Azerbaijan, killing all 32 people on board.
- 23 March
  - Aeroflot Flight 593, an Airbus A310-304, is flying with unauthorized people – the pilot's 16-year-old son and 12-year-old daughter – in the cockpit when the 16-year-old unintentionally disengages the autopilot without the pilots' knowledge, causing the plane to bank steeply, go into an unexpected nearly vertical dive, and crash into a hillside in the Kuznetsk Alatau mountain range 20 km (12 miles) east of Mezhdurechensk, Russia. All 75 people on board die.
  - Two United States Air Force aircraft – a C-130E Hercules and an F-16D Fighting Falcon – collide at low altitude over Pope Air Force Base in North Carolina. The C-130E later lands safely, but the two men aboard the F-16D are forced to eject as the fighter begins to disintegrate. The unmanned F-16D continues in afterburner and punctures the fuel tanks of a parked U.S. Air Force C-141 Starlifter, creating a fireball which, along with the F-16D's wreckage, strikes a large group of United States Army 82nd Airborne Division paratroopers. The crash kills 24 and injures over 80 paratroopers in the division's greatest loss of life since the end of World War II in 1945.
  - Despondent over allegations in the news media of an extramarital affair, American meteorologist Bob Richards, a weatherman at KDSK-TV in St. Louis, Missouri, takes off from Spirit of St. Louis Airport in Chesterfield, Missouri, in a Piper PA-23-180 and apparently commits suicide by deliberately diving it vertically into the ground. He had attempted suicide twice previously.
- 25 March – Aerosvit Airlines is founded. It will begin flight operations in April.

=== April ===
- Aerosvit Airlines begins flight operations, offering service from Kyiv, Ukraine, to Athens and Thessaloniki, Greece; Larnaca, Cyprus; Odesa, Ukraine; and Tel Aviv, Israel, in co-operation with Air Ukraine.
- 1 April – In the United Kingdom, the Women's Royal Air Force merges into the Royal Air Force (RAF), marking the full integration of women into the RAF.
- 3 April – Returning from a skiing trip in Nevada's Ruby Mountains, president of the Walt Disney Company Frank Wells and climber and documentary filmmaker Beverly Johnson die along with two other people when their Bell 206B-2 helicopter flames out during takeoff due to snow accumulation in its engine and crashes in Thorpe Creek Canyon, 5 miles (8 km) south of Lamoille, Nevada. One person survives the crash.
- 4 April – KLM Cityhopper Flight 433, a Saab 340, crashes on landing at Amsterdam Airport Schiphol in Amsterdam, the Netherlands, killing three of the 21 people on board and seriously injuring nine of the 18 survivors.
- 6 April – A surface-to-air missile shoots down the presidential jet of Rwanda, a Dassault Falcon 50, as it prepares to land at Kigali International Airport at Kigali, Rwanda, killing all 12 aboard, including President of Rwanda Juvénal Habyarimana and President of Burundi Cyprien Ntaryamira. Their assassination will spark the 1994 Rwandan genocide.
- 7 April – Flying as a passenger, FedEx employee Auburn Calloway attempts to hijack Federal Express Flight 705, a McDonnell Douglas DC-10-30, by using claw hammers, sledgehammers, and a speargun to murder the crew, planning to crash the plane during a cargo flight from Memphis, Tennessee, to San Jose, California, killing himself so that his family could collect his $2,500,000 FedEx employee life insurance. Although badly injured, the three-man crew manages to restrain Calloway in a struggle during which the DC-10 reaches transonic speeds and flies inverted, then makes an emergency landing at Memphis International Airport.
- 10–11 April – The United Nations Protection Force (UNPROFOR) calls in North Atlantic Treaty Organization (NATO) air strikes to protect the Goražde safe area in Bosnia and Herzegovina, and two U.S. Air Force General Dynamics F-16 Fighting Falcons respond, bombing a Bosnian Serb military command post near Goražde. It is the first time in NATO's history that its aircraft have carried out an air strike.
- 14 April – United States Air Force F-15 Eagles enforcing the no-fly zone over northern Iraq in Operation Provide Comfort II shoot down two United States Army UH-60 Blackhawk helicopters, misidentifying them as Iraqi Mil Mi-25s (NATO reporting name "Hind D"). All 26 people aboard the two helicopters die.
- 16 April – A Bosnian Serb Strela 2 (NATO reporting name "SA-7 Grail") surface-to-air missile shoots down a Royal Navy Fleet Air Arm Sea Harrier over Goražde, Bosnia and Herzegovina. The pilot later is rescued.
- 24 April – A Douglas DC-3 registered VH-EDC of South Pacific Airmotive suffers an engine malfunction shortly after take-off from Sydney Airport in Sydney, Australia, for a charter flight to Norfolk Island and ditches in Botany Bay. All 25 people on board – four crew members and 21 passengers – safely evacuate the aircraft.
- 26 April – An Airbus A300 operating as China Airlines Flight 140 crashes just before landing at Nagoya International Airport in Japan, killing 264 of the 271 people on board.

=== June ===
- 2 June – In the Royal Air Force's worst peacetime aviation disaster, an RAF Boeing Chinook helicopter crashes on the Mull of Kintyre in Scotland, killing all 29 people on board. Among the dead are almost all of the United Kingdom's senior Northern Ireland intelligence experts.
- 6 June – In what remains the People's Republic of China's deadliest air disaster, the autopilot aboard China Northwest Airlines Flight 2303, a Tupolev Tu-154M, malfunctions, causing the airliner to shake violently, break apart in flight, and crash south of Xi'an, China, killing all 160 people on board.
- 9 June – An Antonov An-124 Ruslan carries a 109-tonne IE 201 Class locomotive from London, Ontario, Canada, to Dublin, Ireland.
- 24 June – A U.S. Air Force B-52H Stratofortress crashes at Fairchild Air Force Base outside Spokane, Washington, when its pilot banks it too steeply during a go-around, killing the entire crew of four.
- 30 June – An Airbus A330-300 on a test flight crashes at Toulouse-Blagnac Airport in Toulouse, France, killing all seven people on board. It is the first fatal accident involving an A330 and will remain the only one until 2009; it also is the first hull-loss of an A330.

=== July ===
- 2 July – USAir Flight 1016, a Douglas DC-9-31 on approach in heavy rain to Charlotte/Douglas International Airport in Charlotte, North Carolina, crashes, the victim of a microburst. Thirty-seven of the 57 people aboard die, and 15 of the 20 survivors are injured.
- 12 July – A Royal Air Force C-130 Hercules flies the 10,000th United Nations relief flight into Sarajevo, Yugoslavia.
- 19 July – Alas Chiricanas Flight 00901, an Embraer EMB 110 Bandeirante, explodes shortly after departing Enrique Adolfo Jiménez Airport in Colón, Panama, killing all 21 people on board. Investigators determine that a suicide bomber probably brought the plane down, perhaps to kill 12 Jews who were aboard. A group named Ansar Allah ("Followers of God") claims responsibility, but is later found not to exist, and the bombing remains unsolved.

=== August ===
- Flight Lieutenant Jo Salter is posted to the Royal Air Force's No. 617 Squadron, which operates Tornado GR1Bs. She is the RAF's first female fast jet pilot.
- Aeropostal Alas de Venezuela (LAV) ceases operations as part of a Venezuelan government effort to reduce expenditures. The airline will not resume operations until January 1998.
- 5 August – In response to a request to the North Atlantic Treaty Organization (NATO) by the United Nations Protection Force (UNPROFOR), two U.S. Air Force A-10 Thunderbolt IIs attack and destroy a Serbian anti-tank vehicle near Sarajevo, Bosnia and Herzegovina.
- 17 August – President of the United States Bill Clinton signs the General Aviation Revitalization Act into law. It generally shields most manufacturers of aircraft that carry fewer than 20 passengers and aircraft parts from liability for most accidents involving their products, including those which cause injuries or fatalities, if the products are 18 years old or older at the time of the accident, even if manufacturer negligence was a cause of the accident.
- 21 August – Royal Air Maroc Flight 630, an ATR 42-312, crashes at Douar Izounine, Morocco, in the Atlas Mountains 10 minutes after takeoff from Al Massira Airport, in Agadir, Morocco, killing all 44 people on board, including a Kuwaiti prince and his wife. An investigation concluded that the pilot deliberately disconnected the autopilot and crashed the plane, although a flight union disputes the finding. At the time, it is the deadliest accident involving an ATR 42.
- 27 August – A DEA CASA 212 Aviocar light transport aircraft (reg. N119CA), flying in support of Operation Snowcap, crashed into a mountain (or at the end of a box canyon) north of Puerto Pizana, in the Amazonian jungle department of San Martín, Peru. The crash reportedly occurred during a flight from Santa Lucia to Pucallpa in the Huallaga River Valley region and was apparently due to bad weather and low visibility (rainy and foggy) during a reconnaissance operation. The plane's five occupants, DEA Special Agents Frank S. Wallace, Jay W. Seale, Juan C. Vars, Meredith Thompson, and Frank Fernandez Jr., were killed.
- 30 August – Lockheed and Martin Marietta announce their intention to merge. They will form Lockheed-Martin the following year.

=== September ===
- 8 September – USAir Flight 427, a Boeing 737-300, crashes into a hillside near Aliquippa in Beaver County, Pennsylvania, while on approach to Pittsburgh International Airport in Pittsburgh, Pennsylvania, killing all 132 people aboard; among the dead is noted neuroethologist Walter Heiligenberg. The ensuring accident investigation lasts 4½ years – still the longest in aviation history.
- 12 September – Distraught over breaking up with his third wife, wanting to gain notoriety, and under the influence of alcohol and cocaine, Frank Corder steals a Cessna 150 from Aldino Airport near Baltimore, Maryland, and crashes it onto the South Lawn of the White House in Washington, D.C., killing himself. The plane is undetected until seen over the White House lawn, prompting a change in security procedures at the White House.
- 18 September – After aborting four landing attempts at Tamanrasset Airport in bad weather and circling the airport for 90 minutes, an Oriental Airlines BAC One-Eleven (registration 5N-IMO) runs out of fuel and crashes near Tamanrasset, Algeria, killing five of the 39 people on board. Nigerian football (soccer) player Omalie Aimuanmwosari is among the dead.
- 22 September – In response to a request to the North Atlantic Treaty Organization (NATO) by the United Nations Protection Force (UNPROFOR), two Royal Air Force SEPECAT Jaguars and a U.S. Air Force A-10 Thunderbolt II attack and destroy a Bosnian Serb T-55 tank in Bosnia and Herzegovina.
- 24 September - L-100-30 PK-PLV of HeavyLift crashed into water on take-off from Kai Tak Airport, Hong Kong, overspeed on number four propeller. This was the second and last Hercules accident at this airport.
- 25 September – In Denver, Colorado, the new Denver International Airport hosts a fly-in that attracts several hundred general aviation aircraft, giving their pilots a chance to see the new airport's facilities. However, Denver International will not open to traffic until February 28, 1995.

=== October ===
- In Denver, Colorado, Continental Airlines closes its pilot and flight attendant bases in at Stapleton International Airport.
- 1 October – United Airlines creates a new airline named United Shuttle.
- 25 October – U.S. Navy Lieutenant Kara Hultgreen, history's first female aircraft carrier-based fighter pilot, is killed off San Diego, California, in the crash into the Pacific Ocean of an F-14 Tomcat fighter she is piloting on final approach to the aircraft carrier USS Abraham Lincoln (CVN-72). Her radar intercept officer ejects and survives.
- 31 October – An ATR 72 operating as American Eagle Airlines Flight 4184 crashes in Roselawn, Indiana, after a flaw in the ATR 72's deicing system leads to a buildup of ice on its wings. All 68 people on board die.

=== November ===
- Aero Trasporti Italiani (ATI), a subsidiary of Alitalia, ceases operations after 30 years of service and merges back into Alitalia.
- 3 November – Haris Keč, a Bosnian, hijacks a McDonnell Douglas MD-82 operating as Scandinavian Airlines System Flight 347 en route from Bardufoss Airport to Bodø Airport in Norway with 128 people on board, and makes demands that the Norwegian government take action to stop humanitarian suffering in Bosnia and Herzegovina. No one is injured in the incident.
- 6 November – During the Angolan Civil War, a surface-to-air missile fired by UNITA forces shoots down an Angolan Air Force Sukhoi Su-22 (NATO reporting name "Fitter") during an air raid against Huambo, Angola. The pilot ejects safely.
- 13 November – Ukraine International Airlines begins cargo operations. Its first cargo flight is to London and Amsterdam, using a Boeing 737-200.
- 22 November – During its takeoff roll at Lambert-St. Louis International Airport in Bridgeton, Missouri, Transworld Airlines Flight 427, a McDonnell Douglas MD-82 with 140 people on board, strikes a Cessna 441 Conquest II. There are no injuries aboard the MD-82, but both people on the Cessna die.
- 28 November – KLM Flight 1673, a Boeing 737-406 with 146 people on board, suffers a landing gear failure during its takeoff roll at Amsterdam Airport Schiphol in Amsterdam, the Netherlands, veers off the runway, and crashes. All on board survive, but the aircraft is written off.

=== December ===
- 11 December – A bomb planted by terrorist Ramzi Yousef explodes aboard Philippine Airlines Flight 434, a Boeing 747-200 with 293 people on board, over Minami Daito Island, killing one passenger and injuring 10 other people. The aircraft lands at Okinawa without further incident.
- 12 December – Alliance Air, a multinational airline based in Uganda, is founded. It will begin flight operations in July 1995.
- 13 December – After a suspected engine flameout, the pilot of an American Eagle British Aerospace Jetstream 3201 (registration N918AE) attempts a go-around at Morrisville, North Carolina, but the plane stalls and crashes, killing 15 of the 20 people on board. Bass Masters Classic fishing champion Bryan Kerchalt is among the dead.
- 21 December – Air Algérie Flight 702P, the Boeing 737-2D6C Oasis leased by Phoenix Aviation, crashes in bad weather on landing at Coventry Airport in Coventry, England, killing all five people on board.
- 24–26 December – The Armed Islamic Group (GIA) hijacks Air France Flight 8969 at Algiers, Algeria, killing three passengers. Intending to crash the plane into the Eiffel Tower, the hijackers allow it to fly to Marseille, France, where the French Gendarmerie's GIGN unit storms it and kills all four hijackers.
- 29 December – The Turkish Airlines Boeing 737-4Y0 Mersin, operating as Flight 278, crashes in driving snow while on approach to Van Ferit Melen Airport in Van, Turkey, killing 57 of the 76 people on board.

== First flights ==
=== February ===
- 15 February – Eurocopter EC135 — first preproduction prototype.

=== March ===
- 27 March – Eurofighter Typhoon 98+29

=== May ===
- 13 May – 21st Century Airships SPAS 13 C-FRLM
- 17 May – Ilyushin Il-103

=== June ===
- 12 June – Boeing 777 N7771
- 23 June — Antonov An-38

=== September ===
- 13 September – Airbus Beluga

=== October ===
- 25 October – Bell 430 C-GBLL

=== November ===
- 22 November — McDonnell Douglas MD 600N
- 29 November — Stoddard-Hamilton GlaStar

=== December ===
- 7 December — ROS-Aeroprogress T-101 Grach
- 16 December – Antonov An-70, first aircraft to take flight powered only by propfan engines

== Entered service ==
- December – Tupolev Tu-204

== Retirements ==
- Lockheed P-2 Neptune by the Japan Maritime Self-Defense Force
- 30 March – Westland Scout
- 24 June – Hamburger Flugzeugbau HFB-320 Hansa Jet

== Deadliest crash ==
The deadliest crash of this year was China Airlines Flight 140, an Airbus A300 which crashed on landing in Nagoya, Japan on 26 April, killing 264 of the 271 people on board. This accident marked the deadliest single-aircraft crash in the 1990s.
