= 1998 in aviation =

This is a list of aviation-related events from 1998.

== Events ==
- Cirrus Aircraft successfully flight-tests the CAPS ballistic emergency aircraft parachute.
- Adam Aircraft Industries founded
- Eclipse Aviation founded

=== January ===
- January 4 – A passenger aboard Olympic Airways Flight 417, a Boeing 747 flying from Athens, Greece, to New York, New York, dies after exposure to secondhand smoke during the flight. The incident highlights a health danger of smoking aboard airliners and results in a US$1.4 million court judgment against Olympic Airways.
- January 8 – Aeropostal Alas de Venezuela (LAV), grounded since August 1994 by its owner, the Government of Venezuela, in an effort to reduce expenditures, resumes flight operations under private ownership.
- January 9 – Due to a maintenance error, a Cessna 182P Skylane piloted by American winemaker Richard Graff loses engine power after takeoff from Salinas Municipal Airport in Salinas, California. He attempts to return to the airport for an emergency landing, but the plane crashes, killing him.

=== February ===
- February 2 – Cebu Pacific Flight 387, a McDonnell Douglas DC-9-32, crashes into a mountain near Pagalungan in the Philippines. All of the 104 passengers and crew members are killed.
- February 3 – A United States Marine Corps EA-6B Prowler electronic warfare aircraft of Marine Tactical Electronic Warfare Squadron 2 (VMAQ-2) (VMAQ-2) strikes a cable supporting the aerial tramway at Cavalese, Italy, causing one of the tramway's cars to plunge over 80 meters (260 feet) to the ground, killing all 20 people in the car. The Prowler lands safely.
- February 6 – President Bill Clinton signs legislation changing the name of Washington National Airport in Arlington, Virginia, to Ronald Reagan Washington National Airport.
- February 16 – China Airlines Flight 676, an Airbus A300-60DR, crashes into a residential area while attempting to land in Taipei, Taiwan. All 196 people on board are killed, in addition to six more on the ground. Among the dead is the president of Taiwan's central bank, Sheu Yuan-dong.
- February 20
  - OceanAir – the future Azores Airlines – is rebranded as SATA International. It has not flown since 1994, but it will resume flight operations on 8 April.
  - Trans World Airlines retires the last of its Boeing 747 airliners, making the Boeing 767 its main intercontinental aircraft.

=== March ===
- March 15 – Israeli Brigadier General Tal Shmuel Eldar is one of two people killed in the crash of an Israeli Air Force Bell AH-1 Cobra attack helicopter in the Mediterranean Sea off the coast of Israel during a training flight.
- March 18 – Formosa Airlines Flight 7623, a Saab 340, crashes off the coast of Taiwan shortly after take-off, killing all 13 people on board.
- March 19 – An Ariana Afghan Airlines Boeing 727 hits a mountain near Charasyab, Afghanistan while descending to land. All 45 on board die.
- March 22 – Philippine Airlines Flight 137, an Airbus A320-214 with 127 people on board, overshoots the end of the runway while landing at Bacolod City Domestic Airport in Bacolod in the Philippines, plowing through several houses. All on board the airliner survive, but three people on the ground die; 89 people are injured in the accident.

=== April ===
- April 2 – The Government of Slovakia establishes the Civil Aviation Authority of the Slovak Republic as Slovakia′s national civil aviation authority.
  - SATA International – the future Azores Airlines – which had not flown since 1994 when it was known as OceanAir, resumes flight operations.
- April 20 – Air France Flight 422, a Boeing 727, crashes into a mountain near Bogotá, Colombia, in foggy weather shortly after takeoff from El Dorado International Airport, killing all 53 people on board.
- April 22 – Trans World Airlines announces that it has ordered 24 McDonnell Douglas MD-83 airliners from McDonnell Douglas, with all the aircraft to be delivered during 1999.

=== May ===
- The Republic of China establishes the Aviation Safety Council, responsible for aviation accident investigation, with the purpose of analyzing causal factors and proposing flight safety recommendations in Taiwan.
- May 5 – An Occidental Petroleum Boeing 737-282 crashes on approach to Alférez FAP Alfredo Vladimir Sara Bauer Airport in Peru, killing 75 people on board.
- May 15 – The Government of Portugal establishes the National Institute of Civil Aviation to serve as Portugal′s national civil aviation authority. It replaces the Directorate General of Civil Aviation, which is abolished on this date.
- May 25
  - The Republic of China creates the Aviation Safety Council, responsible for aviation accident investigations in Taiwan.
  - Three armed men belonging to the Baloch Students Organization hijack Pakistan International Airlines Flight 544, a Fokker F27 Friendship with 35 other people on board, just after takeoff from Gwadar International Airport in Gwadar, Pakistan, and attempt to force it to fly to New Delhi, India, but Pakistan Air Force F-16 Fighting Falcons force the airliner to land at Hyderabad Airport in Hyderabad, Pakistan. After seven hours, Pakistani Army commandos storm the plane early on May 26 and arrest the hijackets without injury to anyone.
- May 26 – An MIAT Mongolian Airlines Antonov An-24 crashes into a mountain near Erdenet, Mongolia. All 28 people on board die.

=== June ===
- Nargis Bhimji of Karachi, Pakistan, spends her birthday flying on commercial airliners from Karachi to Singapore and then on to San Francisco, California. The time zone change along the way stretches the day out to a length of 35 hours 25 minutes, allowing her to set the record – recognized by Guinness World Records – for the longest birthday in history. Her record will stand until August 2014.
- June 1 – MetroJet, operated by US Airways, begins operations.
- June 5 – The bankrupt Indonesian airline Sempati Air ceases operations and goes out of business.
- June 15 – The last delivery of an Airbus A310 (msn. 706, reg. UK-31003) is made to Uzbekistan Airways.

=== July ===
- Aeropostal Alas de Venezuela (LAV) resumes service between Venezuela and the United States.
- July 1 – JAL Express, operated by Japan Airlines, commences operations.
- July 6 – Hong Kong's Kai Tak Airport is closed at 1:28 a.m. with the lights of its 13/31 runway being switched off. Operation of the new Hong Kong International Airport at Chek Lap Kok commences on the same day, with the first commercial flight landing at 6:25 a.m.
- July 26 – Just after completing a loop and a four-step corkscrew turn, United States Air Force Lieutenant General David J. McCloud dies when the Yakovlev Yak-54 he is piloting goes into an inverted spin and crashes almost vertically into a grove of trees at Anchorage, Alaska.
- July 30 – After deviating from its planned route and descending over Quiberon Bay off Brittany, France, to give its passengers and crew a good view of the ocean liner SS Norway, Proteus Airlines Flight 706 – a Beechcraft 1900D (registration F-GSJM) with 14 people on board – collides at an altitude of 2,000 feet (610 meters) with a Cessna 177RG Cardinal (registration F-GAJE). Both aircraft plunge into the bay about 1.5 kilometers (0.8 nautical mile) from SS Norway, killing everyone aboard the Proteus Air flight and the sole occupant of the Cessna.

=== August ===
- August 6 – The NASA Pathfinder-Plus unmanned aerial vehicle (UAV) sets a national altitude record for both solar-powered and propeller-driven aircraft, reaching 80,201 feet (24,445 meters) during a flight from the United States Navy's Pacific Missile Range Facility on Kauai, Hawaii.
- August 21
  - A Lumbini Airways de Havilland Canada DHC-6 Twin Otter crashes in a mountainous region near Ghorepani, Nepal. All of the 18 people on board are killed.
  - An Insitu Aerosonde named Laima becomes the first UAV to cross the Atlantic Ocean, completing the flight in 26 hours.
- August 24 – Myanma Airways Flight 635, a Fokker F27 Friendship, crashes in Manibagi, Myanmar, during poor weather while on approach to Tachilek Airport in Tachilek, Myanmar (Burma), killing all 36 people on board. It has been reported that there may have been survivors that were tortured to death by local villagers that thought the aircraft carried military personnel.
- August 29 – Cubana de Aviación Flight 389, a Tupolev Tu-154, crashes during takeoff into buildings in Quito, Ecuador. Seventy-five of the 90 people on board die, as do 10 people on the ground.

=== September ===
- September 1 – The Government of Germany establishes its Federal Bureau of Aircraft Accident Investigation.
- September 2
  - UNITA rebels shoot down a Permaviatrans Antonov An-26 over Angola. All 24 people on board die.
  - Swissair Flight 111, a McDonnell Douglas MD-11, crashes into the North Atlantic Ocean near Halifax, Nova Scotia, Canada, due to smoke in the cockpit caused by insulation burning in the shell. All 229 people on board perish. American physician and World Health Organization official Jonathan Mann, American AIDS and HIV researcher Mary Lou Clements-Mann, and American chef Joseph LaMotta are among the dead.
- September 14 – 23-year-old wheel-well stowaway Emilio Dominguez survives a flight from San Pedro Sula, Honduras, to Miami, Florida, aboard Iberia Flight 6130.
- September 25 – A Paukn Air BAe 146 crashes near Nador, Morocco, killing all 38 people on board.
- September 29 – Liberation Tigers of Tamil Eelam rebels shoot down a Lion Air Antonov An-24. Lionair Flight 602 crashed into the sea off Mannar, Sri Lanka, killing all 55 people on board.

=== October ===
- Continental Airlines receives its first Boeing 777-200ER aircraft, allowing it to make non-stop flights from Newark International Airport in New Jersey and George Bush Intercontinental Airport in Houston, Texas, to Tokyo, Japan, and from Newark to Tel Aviv, Israel.
- October 1 – United States Navy Boeing E-6 Mercury TACAMO aircraft replace United States Air Force Boeing EC-135C aircraft in carrying out Operation Looking Glass for United States Strategic Command.
- October 8 – In Oslo, Norway, Oslo Airport, Fornebu, closes. Its traffic movies to Oslo Airport, Gardermoen.
- October 10 – A Strela 2 (NATO reporting name "SA-7 Grail") surface-to-air missile fired by rebel forces strikes a Lignes Aériennes Congolaises Boeing 727-100 three minutes after the airliner takes off from Kindu Airport in Kindu, Democratic Republic of the Congo. While the flight crew is attempting to return to the airport for an emergency landing, the airliner crashes in dense jungle, killing all 41 people on board.
- October 21 – Trans World Airlines announces that it will acquire four Boeing 757s and one Boeing 767-300ER. The purchase will increase the airline's fleet to 27 Boeing 757s and five Boeing 767-300ERs by January 2000.

=== November ===
- November 13 – U.S. President Bill Clinton orders air attacks against Iraq because of an Iraqi refusal to allow United Nations weapons inspectors to work in Iraq.
- November 14 – Clinton rescinds his order for air attacks on Iraq after Iraq agrees to allow United Nations weapons inspectors to resume their work. The aircraft are already in the air, but abort their attacks.
- November 21 – American actor William Gardner Knight is killed while trying to land a Burgess RV-6 experimental piloting he is piloting in darkness at Edgewater, Maryland. The plane strikes trees and crashes into Beard's Creek, killing him.
- November 24 – Gaza International Airport opens in Gaza City as the first international airport in the Gaza Strip.

=== December ===
- December 9 – Trans World Airlines announces the largest aircraft order in its history, for 125 Boeing 717, Airbus A318, and Airbus A320 family aircraft and options on an additional 125 airliners.
- December 11 – Thai Airways International Flight 261, an Airbus A310-300, crashes on its third attempt to land at Surat Thani Airport near Surat Thani, Thailand, in heavy rain, killing 101 of the 146 people on board and leaving all 45 survivors injured.
- December 15 – France suspends its participation in the Operation Southern Watch no-fly zone over southern Iraq, arguing that the operation has continued for too long and is ineffective.
- December 16 – Citing Iraq's failure to comply with United Nations Security Council Resolutions, U.S. President Bill Clinton orders Operation Desert Fox, a four-day air campaign against targets all over Iraq. The operation begins an increased level of combat in the Operation Southern Watch no-fly zone which will last until the invasion of Iraq in March 2003.
- December 31 – Nepal creates the Civil Aviation Authority of Nepal.

== First flights ==
=== January ===
- January 20 – Fairchild Dornier 328JET
- January 18 – Aero AT-3
- January 23 – AEA Explorer

=== February ===
- February 11 – Boeing C-32
- February 28 – Ryan (now Northrop Grumman) RQ-4 Global Hawk

=== March ===
- March 6 – Bell Eagle Eye scaled prototype tiltrotor UAV.
- March 12 – X-38 Crew Return Vehicle atmospheric test prototype

=== April ===
- April 10 – Comp Air 10

=== May ===
- May 8 – PADC Hummingbird

=== July ===
- July 26 – Scaled Composites Proteus
- July 27 – Dorna Parandeh Abi

=== August ===
- August 11 – Boeing X-40

=== September ===
- September 24 – Beriev Be-200 Altair

=== November ===
- November 10 – NASA Centurion (full-scale version)

=== December ===
- December 10 – Kamov Ka-60
- December 22 – Beechcraft Premier I
- December 23 – Sikorsky S-92

== Entered service ==
=== August ===
- Ilyushin Il-114 with Uzbekistan Airways
- August 31 – Sukhoi Su-33 (NATO reporting name "Flanker-D") with the Russian Federation Navy (officially)

== Deadliest crash ==
The deadliest crash of this year was Swissair Flight 111, a McDonnell Douglas MD-11 which crashed into the Atlantic Ocean near Halifax, Nova Scotia, Canada on 2 September, killing all 229 people on board.
