= Cape Newenham LRRS Airport =

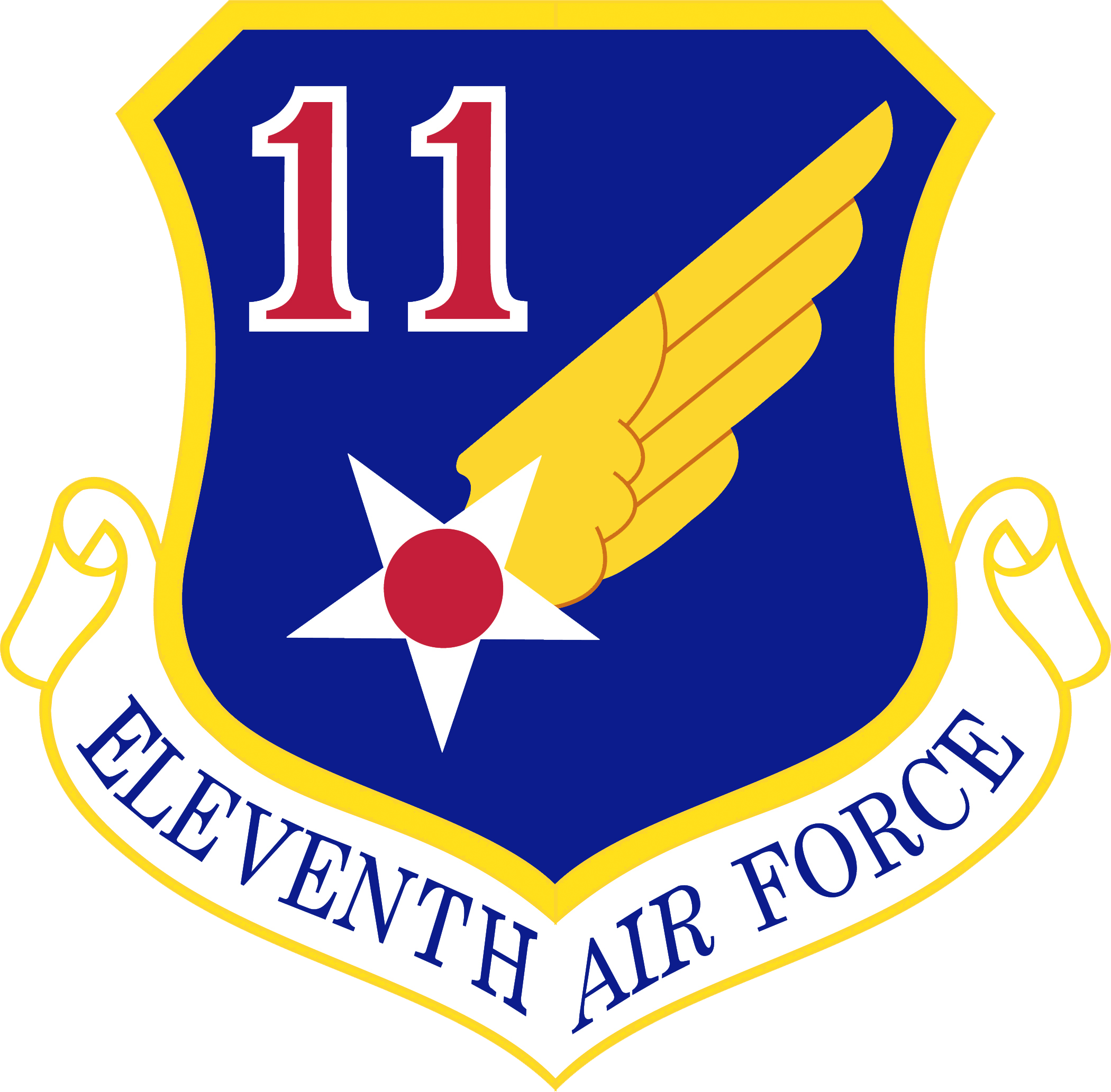
Cape Newenham LRRS Airport
- IATA: EHM; ICAO: PAEH; FAA LID: EHM

Summary
- Airport type: Military
- Owner: U.S. Air Force
- Location: Cape Newenham, Alaska
- Elevation AMSL: 541 ft (165 m)
- Coordinates: 58°38′47″N 162°03′46″W

Map
- Location of airport in Alaska

Runways
| Direction | Length | | Surface |
| Direction | ft | m | Surface |
|---|---|---|---|
| 15/33 | 3,945 | 1,202 | Gravel |

Statistics (2015)
- Based aircraft: 0
- Passengers: 104
- Freight: 84,000 lbs
- Source: Federal Aviation Administration

Cape Newenham LRRS Airport (IATA: EHM, ICAO: PAEH, FAA LID: EHM) is a military airstrip located one nautical mile (1.2 miles; 1.9 km) southeast of Cape Newenham, in the Dillingham Census Area of the U.S. state of Alaska. It is not open for public use.

== Overview ==
Cape Newenham Airport is a United States Air Force military airstrip. Its mission is to provide access to the Cape Newenham Long Range Radar Station for servicing and other requirements.

The airstrip was constructed in 1951 during the construction of the Cape Newenham Air Force Station. During the station's operational use as a staffed radar station, it provided transportation for station personnel and for supplies and equipment to be airlifted to the station. With the radar station's closure in 1983, the airstrip now provides access to the unattended site for maintenance personnel and other requirements.

It is not staffed by any support personnel, and is not open to the public. During the winter months, it may be inaccessible due to the extreme weather conditions at the location.

A civilian contractor has a rotating staff of between four and six persons at the site for maintenance and operations and a traveling maintenance staff for less routine services. The runway has an instrument approach and weather station and is kept open year-round, except during snow removal and grading/compacting, as it is the main method of transporting personnel, supplies and food.

== Facilities and aircraft ==
Cape Newenham LRRS Airport has one runway designated 15/33 with a gravel surface measuring 3,950 by 150 feet (1,204 by 46 m). For the 12-month period ending August 2, 1978, the airport had 1,024 aircraft operations, an average of 85 per month: 98% air taxi and 2% military.

=== Statistics ===
Carrier shares: January – December 2015
| Carrier | Passengers (arriving and departing) |
|---|---|
| Grant | 10(100.00%) |

Top domestic destinations: January – December 2015
| Rank | City | Airport | Passengers |
|---|---|---|---|
| 1 | (Alaska) Bethel, AK | Bethel Airport | 50 |

== Accidents and incidents ==
Eight people were killed when their plane crashed at the airport on August 20, 2026. The Cessna 441 Conquest II, tail number N128EZ, had departed Anchorage that morning and crashed on approach at 12:15 p.m. The U.S. Army Corps of Engineers chartered the plane, which was operated by Security Aviation.
