= 1998 Occidental Petroleum Boeing 737 crash =

Aviation accident in Peru

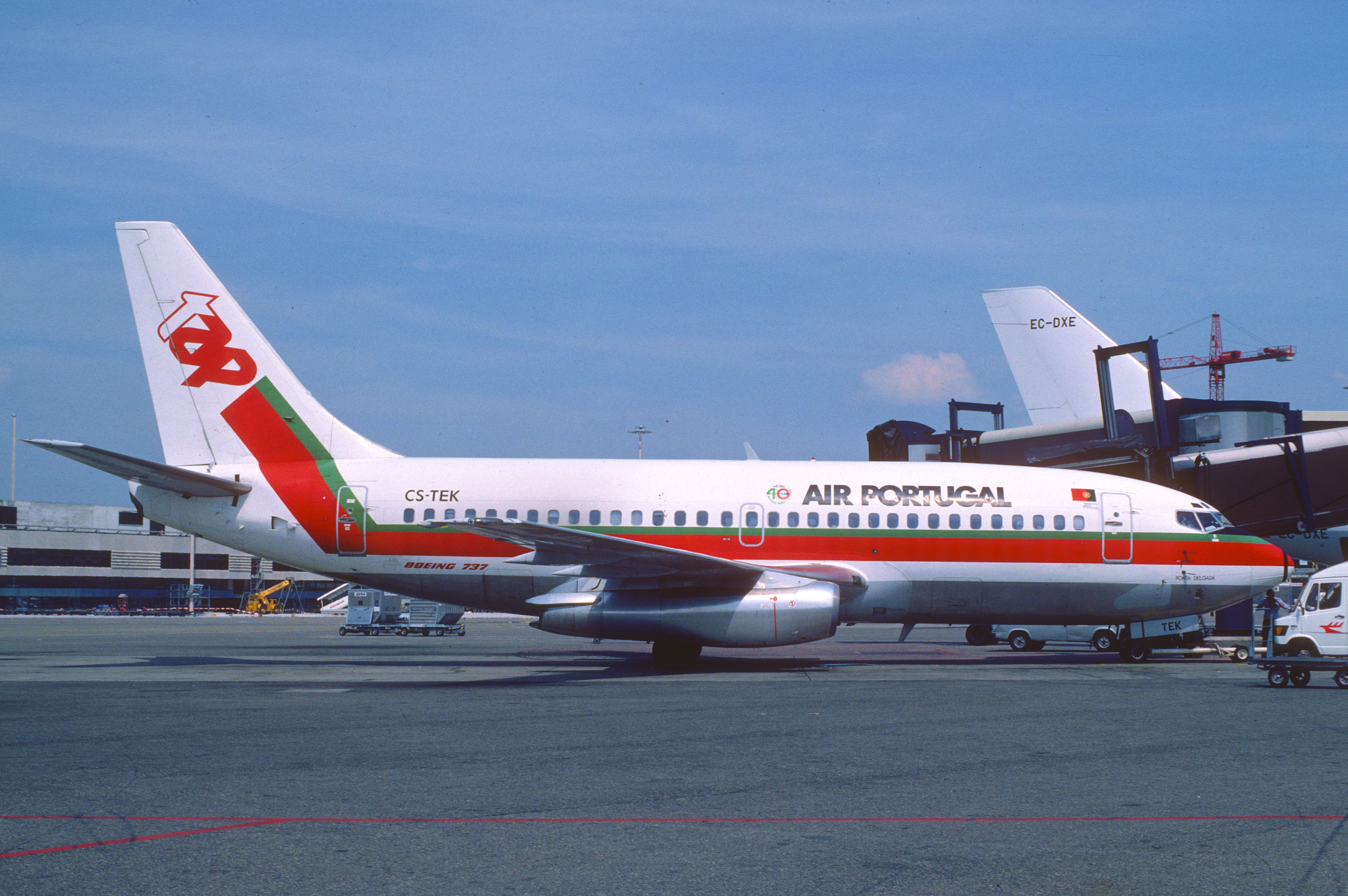
- The aircraft involved in the accident while still in operation with TAP Air Portugal in 1986

Accident
- Date: 5 May 1998
- Summary: Controlled flight into terrain on approach during bad weather
- Site: Three kilometers from Andoas, Peru; 2.778°S 76.502°W

Aircraft
- Aircraft type: Boeing 737-282
- Operator: Occidental Petroleum
- Registration: FAP-351
- Flight origin: Coronel FAP Francisco Secada Vignetta International Airport, Iquitos
- Destination: Alférez FAP Alfredo Vladimir Sara Bauer Airport, Andoas
- Occupants: 88
- Passengers: 80
- Crew: 8
- Fatalities: 75
- Survivors: 13

The 1998 Occidental Petroleum Boeing 737 crash occurred on May 5, 1998 a Boeing 737-200, leased from the Fuerza Aérea del Perú (Peruvian Air Force) and servicing a charter flight for Occidental Petroleum, crashed in rainy weather while on approach to Andoas, a town in Peru close to the border with Ecuador, killing 75 people on board; eleven passengers and two crew members survived.

== Flight history ==
The plane had been acquired along with another 737 as part of government plans to increase so-called "civic flights" to serve remote and poorly served regions, towns and cities, as well as to address seasonal seating capacity. More controversially, it may have been acquired to complement or compete with private airlines during periods of intense competition and high demand for air travel in Peru. In the 1990s, several established and short-lived low cost airlines were engaged in a "fare war" that followed the deregulation of Peru's commercial aviation sector, which itself occurred during the context of the economic liberalization period of President Alberto Fujimori after the country's 1980s crisis.

== Crash ==
The aircraft crashed around 21:30 local time while on an NDB approach to Alférez FAP Alfredo Vladimir Sara Bauer Airport at Andoas. The aircraft crashed three miles (4.8 km; 2.6 nmi) short of Andoas. It was scheduled to arrive at Andoas at 21:17 local time.

Medical teams were delayed more than a day in reaching the crash site due to poor weather, with the survivors being carried on stretchers in torrential rain to a medical post in Andoas because the weather prevented their evacuation by helicopter. Later, a Peruvian Air Force Boeing 737 rescue aircraft flew to Andoas, carrying a medical team, crash experts and police investigators.
