= Security Aviation Flight 45 =

2026 aviation incident in Alaska

- A photo of the crash site taken by the NTSB

Accident
- Date: August 20, 2026
- Summary: Crashed on approach in poor visibility; under investigation
- Site: Near Cape Newenham LRRS Airport, Alaska, United States; 58°38′56.1″N 162°10′22.5″W

Aircraft
- N128EZ, the aircraft involved in the accident, pictured in July 2026
- Aircraft type: Cessna 441 Conquest II
- Operator: Security Aviation
- ICAO flight No.: SVX45
- Call sign: SECURITY AIR 45
- Registration: N128EZ
- Flight origin: Ted Stevens Anchorage International Airport, Alaska, United States
- Destination: Cape Newenham LRRS Airport, Alaska, United States
- Occupants: 8
- Passengers: 6
- Crew: 2
- Fatalities: 8
- Survivors: 0

Security Aviation Flight 45 was a charter passenger flight from Ted Stevens Anchorage International Airport to Cape Newenham LRRS Airport in Alaska, United States. On August 20, 2026, a Cessna 441 Conquest II operating that flight crashed on approach to its destination. All eight people on board were killed. Weather was reported to be poor at the airport at the time of the accident. The National Transportation Safety Board has started an investigation into the crash.

== Background ==
=== Aircraft ===
The aircraft involved in the accident was a Cessna 441 Conquest II registered as N128EZ and manufactured in 1979. The plane was owned by the Alaskan regional airline Security Aviation, which specialised in charter flights.

=== Occupants ===
The airplane was carrying eight people: two crew members and six passengers. The two pilots were 73 years old captain Dave Furber and 34 years old first officer Sergei Zelenkov, they were both Security Aviation employees. The passengers were two engineers from the United States Army Corps of Engineers and four civilian contractors, two of which were employees of Calista Brice, an Alaskan native owned company. They chartered the flight to reach the Cape Newenham Long Range Radar Site, where they were due to carry out a routine site inspection and maintenance work at a newly installed anti-fire system. The Alaskan Command stated that more information on the crew and occupants will be released in the following hours. As of August 27 four of the eight occupants have been identified through DNA tests, the identification of the remaining ones is ongoing.

=== Airport ===
The aircraft was headed to Cape Newenham LRRS Airport, the military airstrip located near the Cape Newenham Long Range Radar Site. The radar is managed by the Pacific Air Forces Regional Support Center and is used to track and run air traffic in the western section of alaskan airspace.

== Flight ==
The airplane took off from Ted Stevens Anchorage International Airport at 9:12 am local time headed to Cape Newenham LRRS Airport for a charter flight. The climb and cruise parts of the flight went as planned, until, as the aircraft neared its destination airport, the pilots received a communication that stated that weather conditions at Cape Newenham had worsened. The crew decided to enter a holding pattern to wait for the weather to get better, they continued this manouver for twenty minutes. After completing the third circuit the airplane entered the northern approach pattern to the airport and started its descent phase using an instrument approach procedure. During this approach the visibility diminished again so the pilot in command called for a go around and later started a second landing attempt. At around 12 pm local time Flight 45 impacted terrain on a steep 600 meters high mountain west of the airport. All eight people on board were killed and the plane was completely destroyed on impact. The Alaskan Command coordinated the search and rescue operations that reached the crash site. Sikorsky HH-60 Pave Hawks and Lockheed HC-130 Hercules were deployed in the recovery operations.

== Investigation ==
The National Transportation Safety Board announced that it had launched an investigation into the accident, and that six of its investigators are headed to the crash site, and will reach it in the following days, as soon as the weather conditions get better. It is being planned to recover the wreckage, that is said to be totally destroyed by both the impact and a post-crash fire, by helicopter to transport it in another place to facilitate the work of the investigators. Security Aviation, the airline involved, stated that it's cooperating with the authorities as part of the investigative procedures. On August 25, the NTSB team reached the crash site and started the recovery of the airplane's wreckage. The agency's regional officer Clint Johnson published photos of the wreckage, and described it as "highly fragmented" due to an high speed impact. The wreckage will be recovered by helicopter and then transported to Cape Newenham LRRS Airport, where it will be picked up by a cargo plane and brought to the NTSB offices in Anchorage.

The weather conditions at the airport at the time of the accident were very poor and rapidly deteriorating, with visibility descending from 16 kilometers to under 400 meters in about 15 minutes and a cloud overcast at an height of 60 meters.

=== Preliminary report ===
On September 16, 2026, the National Transportation Safety Board released a preliminary report on the accident. The preliminary report highlighted the low visibility conditions present at Cape Newenham, and stated that the pilots, after missing the first landing attempt, initially communicated that they intended to divert Platinum Airport. But, after they didn't manage to contact the diversion airport through radio, they changed their mind and decided to attempt a second approach at Cape Newenham. The plane later crashed during the third approach, as already known. The NTSB stated that they still haven't determined the cause of the crash, and that the investigation is continuing.

== Reactions ==
Commander of the Alaskan Command, Lt. Gen Robert Davis said that the crash was a devastating loss for the military division and that the deceased passengers were about to conduct an important and vital mission. Alaskan politicians Lisa Murkowski and Nick Begich III also sent condolences to the families of the victims and to the airline.
