= Huallaga River =

Coordinates: 5°13′33″S 75°44′53″W

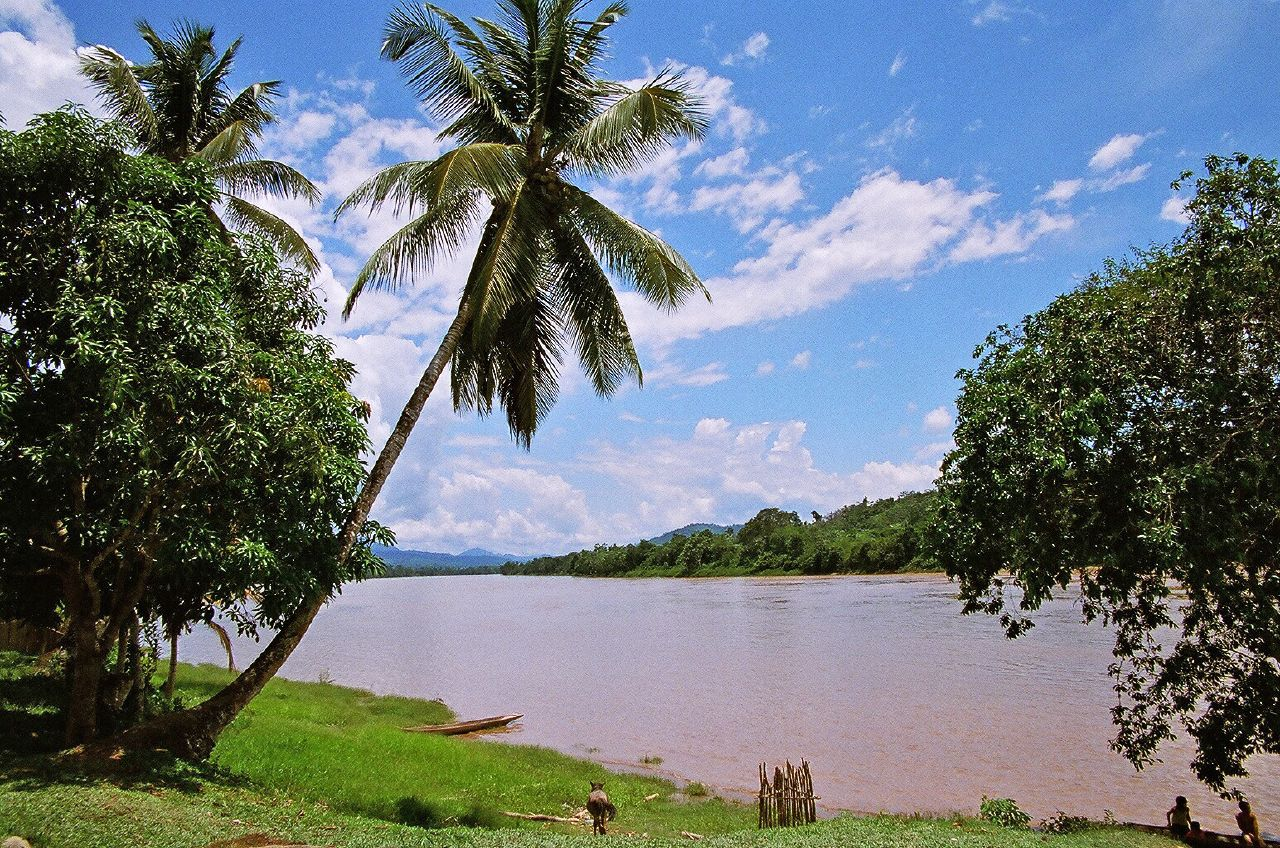
- A view of the Huallaga

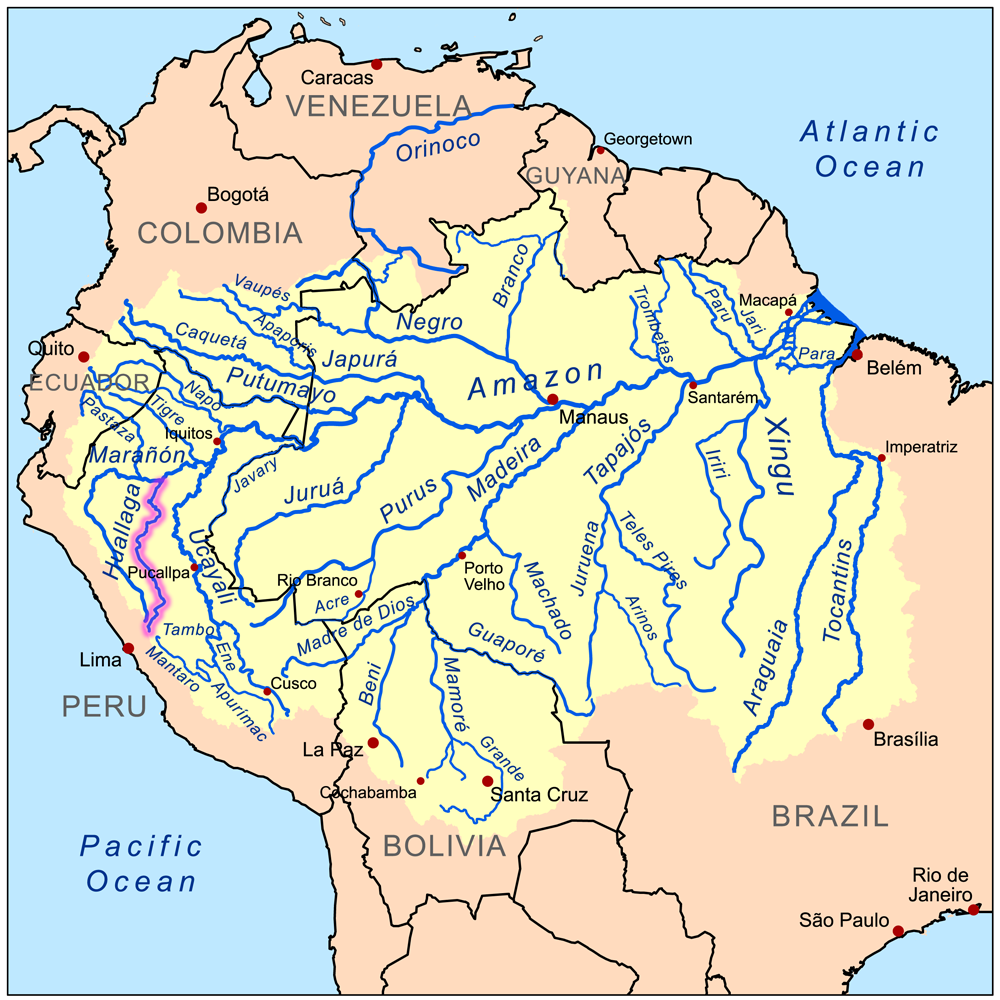
- Map of the Amazon Basin with the Huallaga River highlighted

Location
- Country: Peru
- Region: Huánuco Region, Loreto Region, Pasco Region, San Martín Region

Physical characteristics
- Mouth: Marañón River
- Length: 1,100 km (680 mi)
- Discharge
  - average: 3,800 m^{3}/s (130,000 cu ft/s)

The Huallaga River is a tributary of the Marañón River, part of the Amazon Basin. Old names for this river include Guallaga and Rio de los Motilones. The Huallaga is born on the slopes of the Andes in central Peru and joins the Marañón before the latter reaches the Ucayali River to form the Amazon. Its main affluents are the Monzón, Mayo, Biabo, Abiseo and Tocache rivers. Coca is grown in most of those valleys, which are also exposed to periodic floods.

== Description ==
Although it runs for 700 miles (1,100 km), the Huallaga remains unnavigable for the most part. For nearly its entire length the Huallaga is an impetuous torrent running through a succession of gorges. It has forty-two rapids (pongos) and it crosses the Andes, forming the Pongo de Aguirre gorge. From this point, 140 miles (230 km) from the Amazon, the Huallaga can be ascended by larger river boats (lanchas) to the port city of Yurimaguas, Loreto.

Although there are no defined boundaries, the river is commonly divided into two or three sections. From the town of Tocache in San Martin to the source of the river, it is generally referred to as the Upper Huallaga. Regions of the river are also referred to as the central Huallaga (usually from Tocache or Juanjui to Chazuta), and the lower Huallaga (usually from Chazuta to Yurimaguas where the Huallaga meets the Marañon). These divisions are for general reference, and are independent of the "highland" and "lowland" jungle regions of the Amazon Rainforest.

Between the Huallaga and the Ucayali lies the famous "Pampa del Sacramento," a level region of stoneless alluvial lands covered with thick, dark forests, first entered by Christian missionaries in 1726. It is about 300 miles (480 km) long, from north to south, and varies in width from 40 to 100 kilometers. Many streams, navigable for canoes, penetrate this region from the Ucayali and the Huallaga. In addition to peasants, it is still occupied by many indigenous communities, such as the Cocama-Cocamilla and Kichwa-Lamista communities.

The river and the riversides suffer point source pollution, utilized as an interminable garbage dump. At least one chute for garbage trucks is installed.

== Bio-diversity ==
The Huallaga River supports a myriad of wildlife and vegetation. The river is especially rich in amphibian life. A total of 18 species of frogs have been recorded from it, including the Epipedobates boulengeri, Hyloxalus pulchellus and Ranitomeya reticulata.

== Cocaine ==
Since the 1980s, the primary coca growing and drug trafficking activities in Peru have been in the Upper Huallaga Valley.

The coca is flown to Colombia, where it is used to create cocaine, which is subsequently shipped to the United States.

Vladimiro Montesinos, ex-head of Peru's intelligence service, is reported to have received $50,000 for every plane laden with drugs allowed to leave the Huallaga Valley.

On 27 August 1994, a Drug Enforcement Administration CASA 212 Aviocar light transport aircraft (reg. N119CA) crashed into a mountain (or at the end of a box canyon) north of Puerto Pizana, San Martín, Peru. The crash reportedly happened while on a flight from Santa Lucia to Pucallpa, in the Huallaga River Valley region, and apparently owed to bad weather and low visibility (rainy and foggy) conditions during a counter-narcotics reconnaissance operation. The plane's five occupants, DEA Special Agents Frank S. Wallace, Jay W. Seale, Juan C. Vars, Meredith Thompson, and Frank Fernandez Jr., were killed. This accident precipitated the end of the US anti-drug Operation Snowcap, under which the ill-fated flight was taking place.

== Notable deaths ==
Eric Fleming who played trail boss Gil Favor in the long-running Western TV series Rawhide drowned in the Huallaga River. During the shooting of location shots for an MGM film titled High Jungle on the Huallaga River on September 28, 1966, Fleming fell from a capsized dug-out canoe after paddling it beyond the rapids. His body was lost in the turbulent water and was only recovered three days later.

== See also ==
- Aqumayu
- Vladimiro Montesinos
- Huallaga Province
