= TWA Flight 427 =

1994 runway collision in Missouri

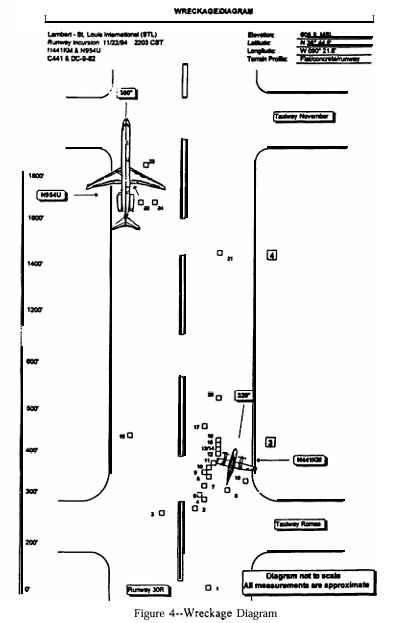
- Wreckage diagram for both aircraft

Accident
- Date: November 22, 1994
- Summary: Runway incursion due to pilot error of the Cessna and ATC error
- Site: St. Louis Lambert International Airport, Bridgeton, Missouri; 38°44′29″N 90°20′46″W
- Total fatalities: 2
- Total injuries: 8
- Total survivors: 140

First aircraft
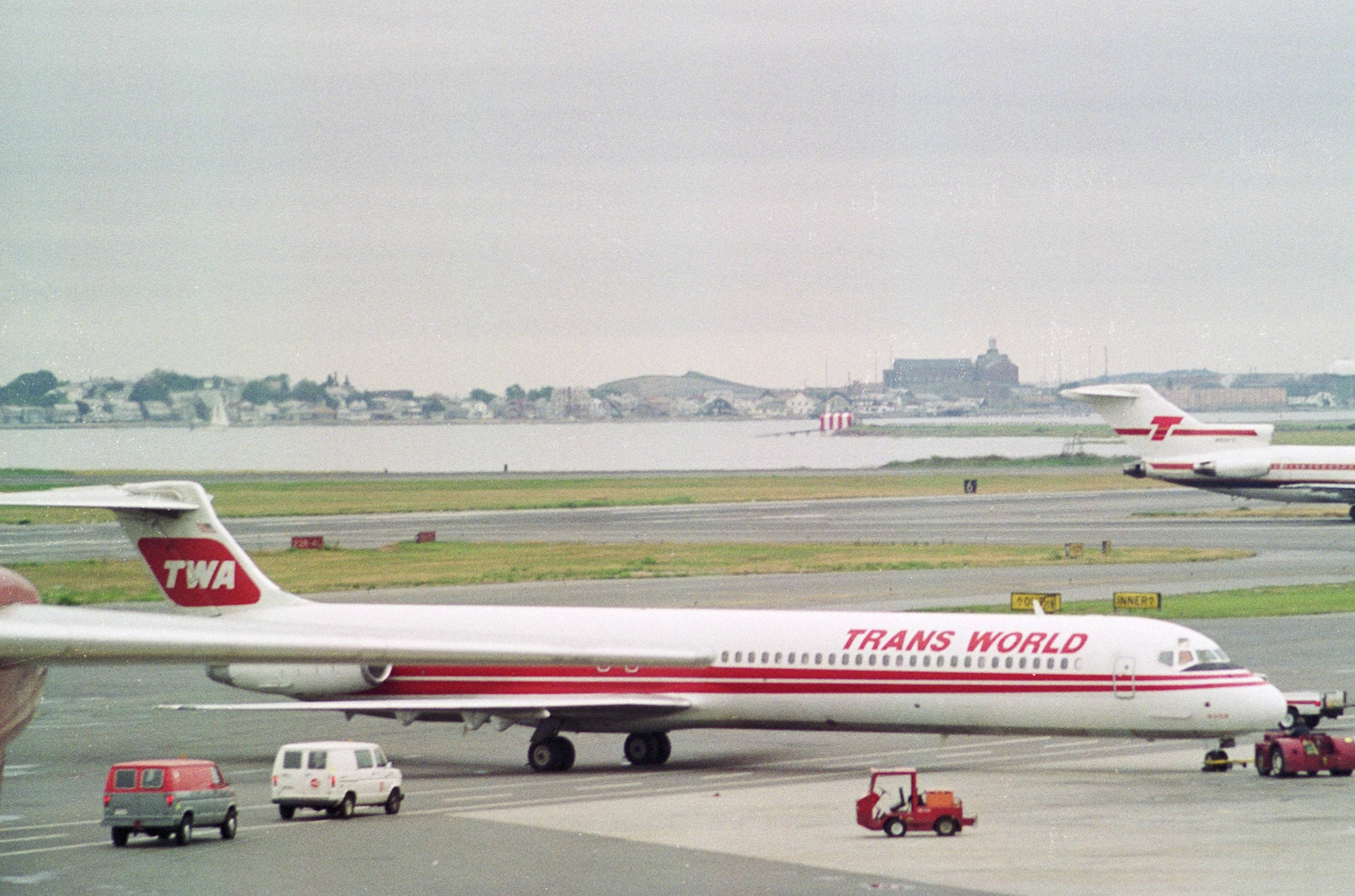
- N954U, the McDonnell Douglas MD-82 involved in the collision, seen in 1990
- Type: McDonnell Douglas MD-82
- Operator: Trans World Airlines
- IATA flight No.: TW427
- ICAO flight No.: TWA427
- Call sign: TWA 427
- Registration: N954U
- Flight origin: St. Louis Lambert International Airport, Bridgeton, Missouri
- Destination: Stapleton International Airport, Denver, Colorado
- Occupants: 140
- Passengers: 132
- Crew: 8
- Fatalities: 0
- Injuries: 8
- Survivors: 140

Second aircraft
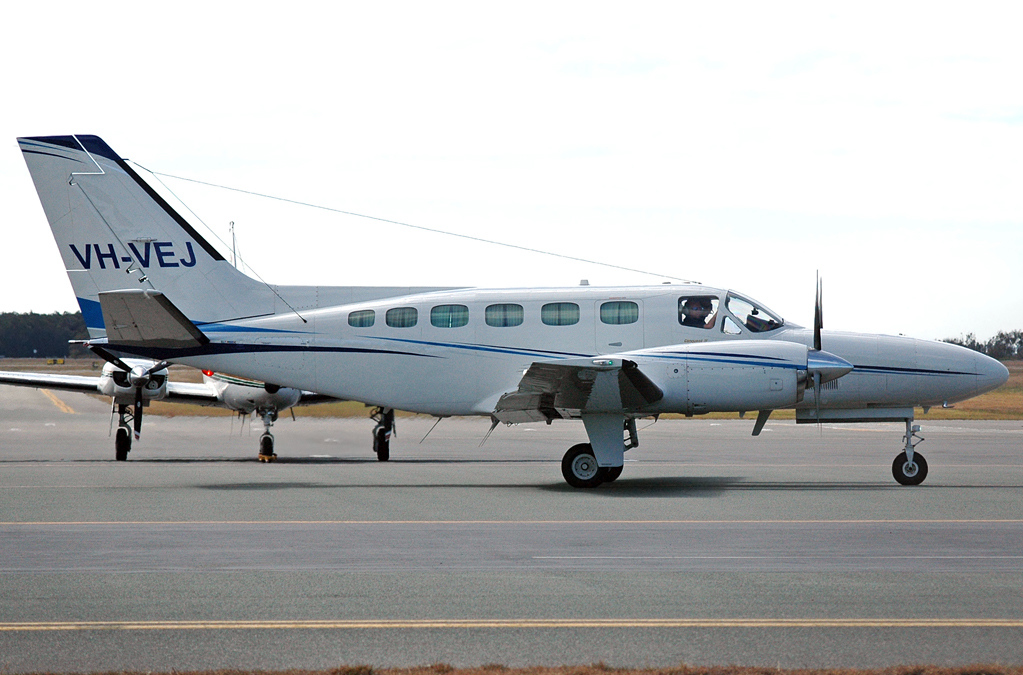
- A Cessna 441, similar to the one involved in the collision
- Type: Cessna 441
- Operator: Superior Aviation
- Call sign: KILO MIKE
- Registration: N441KM
- Flight origin: Ford Airport, Iron Mountain, Michigan
- Stopover: St. Louis Lambert International Airport, Bridgeton, Missouri
- Destination: Ford Airport, Iron Mountain, Michigan
- Occupants: 2
- Passengers: 1
- Crew: 1
- Fatalities: 2
- Survivors: 0

On November 22, 1994, TWA Flight 427, operated using a McDonnell Douglas MD-82, struck a Cessna 441 Conquest II during its take-off roll, killing both of its occupants. The collision took place at St. Louis Lambert International Airport (STL) in Bridgeton, Missouri.

== Aircraft ==
TWA Flight 427 was a regularly scheduled passenger flight from St. Louis International Airport to Stapleton International Airport in Denver, Colorado. On the date of the accident, Flight 427 was operated using a McDonnell Douglas MD-82 (registration number N954U). There were 132 passengers and 8 crew on board. The captain of Flight 427 was Captain Rick Carr (age 57), the first officer was Randy Speed (38), and Randy Richardson was an off-duty crew member occupying the cockpit jumpseat.

On November 22, 1994, Superior Aviation, Inc., a charter airline, operated a charter flight from Ford Airport in Iron Mountain, Michigan to St. Louis International Airport using a Cessna 441 Conquest II (registration number N441KM). After the charter passenger deplaned at St. Louis, the Cessna was then scheduled to depart St. Louis en route to another charter pickup in Iron Mountain.

== Accident ==
Flight 427 was scheduled to depart STL at 21:34 Central Standard Time but pushed back from the gate about 15 minutes late. Apart from the delay, ground operations were routine. Flight 427 was given instructions to taxi to Runway 30R. At 22:01, the first officer advised local controllers that Flight 427 was ready for departure from Runway 30R.

The Cessna arrived in STL and, at about 21:40, taxied to the charter aviation terminal to drop off its passenger. At 21:58, the Cessna's pilot advised ground control that he was ready to taxi back to the runway for departure. The ground controller instructed the Cessna to "back-taxi into position" and hold on Runway 31, and then advise the controller when in position for departure. Although not a formally defined aviation term, "back-taxiing" generally referred to using a runway to taxi in a direction opposite the direction of departing or landing traffic in order to reach the takeoff position further down the runway. Although the ground controller specifically stated Runway 31, the Cessna pilot did not repeat the runway number when acknowledging his instructions. After being cleared to back-taxi on Runway 31, the Cessna pilot instead taxied onto Runway 30R, which Flight 427 was preparing to depart from.

At 22:01:23, Flight 427 was cleared for takeoff from Runway 30R, and the MD-82 taxied onto Runway 30R, with Speed at the controls. Flight 427 began accelerating down the runway at 22:02:27. Two seconds later, the Cessna's pilot advised the local controller that he was "ready to go on the right side." At 22:02:40, Carr called out reaching an airspeed of 80 knots; 2-3 seconds later, Richardson yelled, "There's an airplane!" Simultaneously, both Speed and Carr saw the Cessna and applied braking, and Carr applied hard left rudder in an attempt to direct their aircraft around the Cessna. About 2-3 seconds after they first saw the Cessna, the flight crew of Flight 427 felt the Cessna impact the right side of their plane. Flight 427's flight crew aborted their takeoff, and brought the plane to a stop on the left side of Runway 30R.

The right wing of the MD-82 tore the horizontal and vertical stabilizers off the fuselage of the Cessna, and sheared off the top of the Cessna's fuselage and cockpit; both occupants of the Cessna were killed. The MD-82's cockpit and cabin were not damaged, and no one on board the MD-82 was killed in the collision. Carr shut down the MD-82's engines and immediately called for emergency vehicles. Carr then asked the tower for help determining if there was a fire; the controller asserted he did not see flames, then asserted that the Cessna was not supposed to be on Runway 30R, telling Carr, "He was supposed to be on runway three one. I did not see the aircraft on that runway." Carr responded, "All that later, I just want to make sure everything's safe here."

Due to a large amount of spilled jet fuel, a fire hazard existed and an immediate evacuation was necessary. Eight passengers sustained minor injuries in the evacuation of the aircraft. The airport authority did not officially close the airport after the accident. Aircraft continued to land on runway 30L and taxi nearby during passenger evacuation.

== Investigation ==
The resulting National Transportation Safety Board (NTSB) investigation determined that the Cessna had recently flown in from Iron Mountain, Michigan. It had landed on runway 30R and dropped off a passenger before preparing for the return flight. A commercial-rated pilot and a pilot-rated passenger, married to an employee of Superior Aviation, were on board as it left the ramp. The NTSB could not determine the reason the Cessna's pilot taxied onto the wrong runway, but considered multiple theories, including fatigue from the late hour and anxiety to beat deteriorating weather at the Cessna's destination. Ultimately, the NTSB concluded that the pilot likely had formed a preconceived notion that he would be using Runway 30R, which he had used on arrival, rather than Runway 31.

The Automatic terminal information service (ATIS) information broadcast to all pilots advised that runways 30L and 30R were in use for arrivals and departures. Although runway 31 was routinely used in these conditions for general-aviation aircraft, this information was not included on the hourly ATIS broadcast. The NTSB believed that if the ATIS broadcasts mentioned Runway 31 as an active runway, the Cessna pilot might have been more attentive to the mention of Runway 31 in the ground controller's taxi instructions. In addition, the NTSB criticized the ground controller's use of non-standard phrasing and failure to require the Cessna pilot to repeat back the runway he was cleared to.

According to a NTSB spokesman, Flight 427's pilots averted a major disaster by pulling the aircraft to the left before impact, a maneuver that "avoided what would have been a much worse accident."

== Aftermath ==
The NTSB recommended pilots should be required to read back runway assignments and controllers verify readback. In response, the FAA modified the air traffic controller's handbook to require that controllers obtain confirmation of runway assignment from pilots after issuing taxi instructions. The NTSB endorsed the FAA's action and expressed its view that had this procedure been in effect on the day of this accident, the accident might not have occurred. The NTSB also recommended that the FAA formalize a definition of "back-taxi" so that its use could be standardized.

In addition, the NTSB recommended that ground radar be installed at STL, and reiterated its standing recommendation that all airports should immediately close following any incident until the situation has been assessed.

N954U was later repaired. The aircraft was later transferred to American Airlines after TWA ceased operations in 2001 and was placed into storage in 2017.

== See also ==
- Tenerife airport disaster
- 1990 Wayne County Airport runway collision
- 2001 Linate Airport runway collision
- United Express Flight 5925
- 2024 Haneda Airport runway collision
