= Andoas =

- Village
- Location within Peru
- Coordinates: 2°54′15″S 76°24′10″W
- Country: Peru
- Region: Loreto Region

Andoas is a village on the Pastaza River in the Loreto Region of Peru. It is 44 kilometres (27 mi; 24 nmi) downstream from the Peruvian border with Ecuador, and is 696 kilometres (432 mi; 376 nmi) from the region's capital, Iquitos. Its location is almost exactly 200 miles south of the equator.

Andoas is near Exploitation Lot 192, one of the oil fields in Peru.

Andoas is served by the Alférez FAP Alfredo Vladimir Sara Bauer Airport, 13 kilometres (8.1 mi; 7.0 nmi) upstream at the village of Nuevo Andoas.
