= Operation Snowcap =

1987–1995 American counter-narcotics operation

- Part of the war on drugs
| Date | 1987–1995 |
| Location | Primarily Bolivia, Peru and Ecuador; Also Guatemala, Panama, Costa Rica, Argentina, Brazil, Chile, Venezuela, Colombia and Mexico. |

Belligerents
| United States: DEA; DOD; 1st Special Forces Operational Detachment–Delta (Delta Force); 7th Special Forces Group; Navy SEALs; Special Boat Teams; Coast Guard DIAT; USBP BORTAC; State Department ISM; State Department Air Wing; Bolivia: UMOPAR; Bolivian Navy; Bolivian Air Force; Peru: Civil Guard Police; Peruvian National Police; Colombia: Colombian National Police | Cali cartel Shining Path guerrillas Illicit cocaine manufacturers |

Commanders and leaders
| DEA SAS Frank White | Unknown |

Strength
| 140 DEA Agents; Military. (Unknown) | Unknown |

Casualties and losses
| 6 DEA Agents; 5 State Department contractors; 12 Peruvians killed in two plane crashes | Hundreds of tons of cocaine seized; Thousands of suspected traffickers arrested; Several hundred thousand gallons of precursor chemicals seized; Hundreds of precursor facilities destroyed, Dozens of aircraft and vehicles seized |

Operation Snowcap (1987–1995), launched in the spring of 1987, was a counter-narcotics operation conducted by the Drug Enforcement Administration (DEA), BORTAC (U.S. Border Patrol Tactical Unit) and military/police forces in nine Latin American countries. Operation Snowcap followed Operation Blast Furnace, a four-month operation that started in July 1986, which deployed 160 Army personnel and six Blackhawk helicopters to assist Bolivia in operations against cocaine laboratories in the Beni and Santa Cruz regions of Bolivia. At an annual cost to the DEA of $80 million, and involving approximately 140 agents at its onset, Snowcap was the largest counter-narcotics operation that had been launched in Latin America. The U.S. Department of Defense leased 6 UH-1 Huey helicopters, and provided flight training to Bolivian air force pilots and Special Forces training for UMOPAR and DEA agents.

== History ==
Operation Snowcap recruited several special operations units across U.S. federal agencies and military forces to conduct "Black operations". Leadership was selected by high-level U.S. military personnel in the late 1980s. Senior lieutenants and captains attending advanced courses were given classified briefings, attempting to recruit them from the Army to participate in operations in Bolivia and Peru.

In late 1987, Clandestine Laboratory and Chemical Program Czar, Gene R. Haislip, Deputy Assistant Administrator of DEA and Douglas A. Snyder, frequent Snowcap operative, convinced high level DEA officials that change was needed in the Snowcap program. They successfully lobbied DEA brass, David Westrate, Terry Burke and Chuck Guttenson, for Frank E. White, Chief of DEA Special Training, to become the new head of Snowcap because of his breadth of military experience and no-nonsense law enforcement perspective. The top brass accepted their recommendations.

In a 1988 memo, White, as new head of Snowcap, charged that agents were not being given adequate support for their mission, warning that without immediate changes, "DEA agents are going to agonize along through an excruciating death on an isolated jungle floor." DEA brass supported his request for more U.S. Military special forces assistance to field DEA agents deployed under Snowcap, with the additional deployments of Navy SEALS & Special Boat Teams and Coast Guard special operation elements. However, Frank White never thought the level of support was adequate to protect deployed DEA agents in such remote jungle locations, but trudged forward.

On May 20, 1989, tragedy struck when a US or Peruvian-owned Cessna 208 Caravan that had left Tingo María, in the Peruvian Amazonian highlands, on a DEA coca eradication mission taking place in the context of Operation Snowcap, crashed into Mount Huacranacro, 100 km (62.5 mls) east of Huaral. The nine occupants, six Americans and three Peruvians, were killed. The plane may have suffered an engine failure. After Operation Just Cause U.S. Army added an additional element of soldiers from an Airborne Unit in Panama to assist in helping with this mission. A small group of soldiers were sent to areas in Colombia and Peru to recon and help target drug facilities. They also acted in supporting roles as security for agents when engaging in their narcotic stings. This unit provided this additional support until mid-1990 when it was deemed that their engagement was overtaxing the unit's other mission in the region.

By the end of 1990, Colombian National Police participating in Operation Snowcap had seized 53 metric tons of cocaine, arrested about 7,000 suspected traffickers, destroyed over 300 processing facilities, and seized over 700,000 gallons of precursor chemicals. Snowcap was successful in temporarily reducing the amount of Colombian cocaine entering the United States, however, it ended up handing control of narco-trafficking from the powerful Medellín and Cali cartels over to the smaller Mexican cartels. According to the SAC who was in charge of Operation Snowcap, Tony Laza, the DEA's "success with Medellín and Cali essentially set the Mexicans up in business, at a time when they were already cash-rich thanks to the budding methamphetamine trade in Southern California."

On 27 August 1994, tragedy struck again when a DEA CASA 212 Aviocar light transport aircraft (reg. N119CA) crashed into a mountain (or at the end of a box canyon) north of Puerto Pizana, in the Amazonian jungle department of San Martín, Peru. The crash reportedly happened while on a flight from Santa Lucia to Pucallpa, in the Huallaga River Valley region, and apparently owed to bad weather and low visibility (rainy and foggy) conditions during a reconnaissance operation. The plane's five occupants, DEA Special Agents Frank S. Wallace, Jay W. Seale, Juan C. Vars, Meredith Thompson, and Frank Fernandez Jr., were killed.

This crash, plus a new focus in the Andean counter-narcotics strategy by the newly inaugurated Clinton administration (supported by Congress), and reduced funding by the new DEA administration of Thomas A. Constantine, eventually led to the end of Operation Snowcap in 1995.

Late 1995-1996 during a counter drug operations in Colombia, a support element of special boat teams came under attack in the Antioquia Valley region while conducting reconnaissance operations by members of Colombian insurgents believed to be part of Colombia's counter revolutionary movement (FARC). The boat team members held off a force of roughly 150 rebels. Throughout the three days and nights of fighting, the special boat crew was repeatedly surrounded and cut off from escape. Short of ammunition and water, the team held on until first light on day three, regrouped and counter-attacked, punching a hole in the insurgents defense line and linking up with Navy SEAL support and Colombian special forces sent there to assist them.

During the rescue portion in a remote jungle, DEA Operatives White and Snyder, and Navy Seals R. Gonzales and R. Hernandez were injured after being cornered by several dozen local campesinos wielding machetes and the teams barely escaped harm by boarding an air transport provided by DEAs Addison Air Wing. Members of the teams were cited for their heroism and bravery. The U.S. soon withdrew afterwards and ended all operations.

== See also ==
- Colombian conflict (1964–present)
- Mexican drug war

== Bibliography ==
- Chepesiuk, Ron (1999). "Operation Snowcap". The war on drugs: an international encyclopedia. ABC-CLIO. p. 177. ISBN 978-0-87436-985-4.
