= Comp Air 10 =

Kit aircraft

The Comp Air 10 is a turboprop-powered light civil utility aircraft manufactured in kit form. Very large for a homebuilt aircraft, it is configured as a mainly conventional high-wing monoplane with either taildragger or tricycle undercarriage. Its close-set twin tails are an unusual design feature for an aircraft in its class, intended to ensure that the aircraft can be parked inside standard-size hangars.

A total of eleven examples had been completed and flown by the end of 2011.

The company website does not list it as being in production in 2022.

== Specifications (typical Comp Air 10) ==
General characteristics

- Crew: one
- Capacity: nine passengers
- Length: 31 ft 0 in (9.45 m)
- Wingspan: 39 ft 0 in (11.89 m)
- Height: 8 ft 8 in (2.64 m)
- Wing area: 242 sq ft (22.5 m^{2})
- Empty weight: 2,750 lb (1,247 kg)
- Max takeoff weight: 5,200 lb (2,359 kg)
- Powerplant: 1 × Walter M601D turboprop, 657 shp (490 kW)

Performance

- Maximum speed: 193 kn (222 mph, 357 km/h)
- Range: 798 nmi (918 mi, 1,477 km)
- Rate of climb: 2,000 ft/min (10 m/s)

== See also ==
Aircraft of comparable role, configuration, and era

- Cessna 207
