= Scandinavian Airlines System Flight 347 =

1994 aircraft hijacking

SAS Flight 347
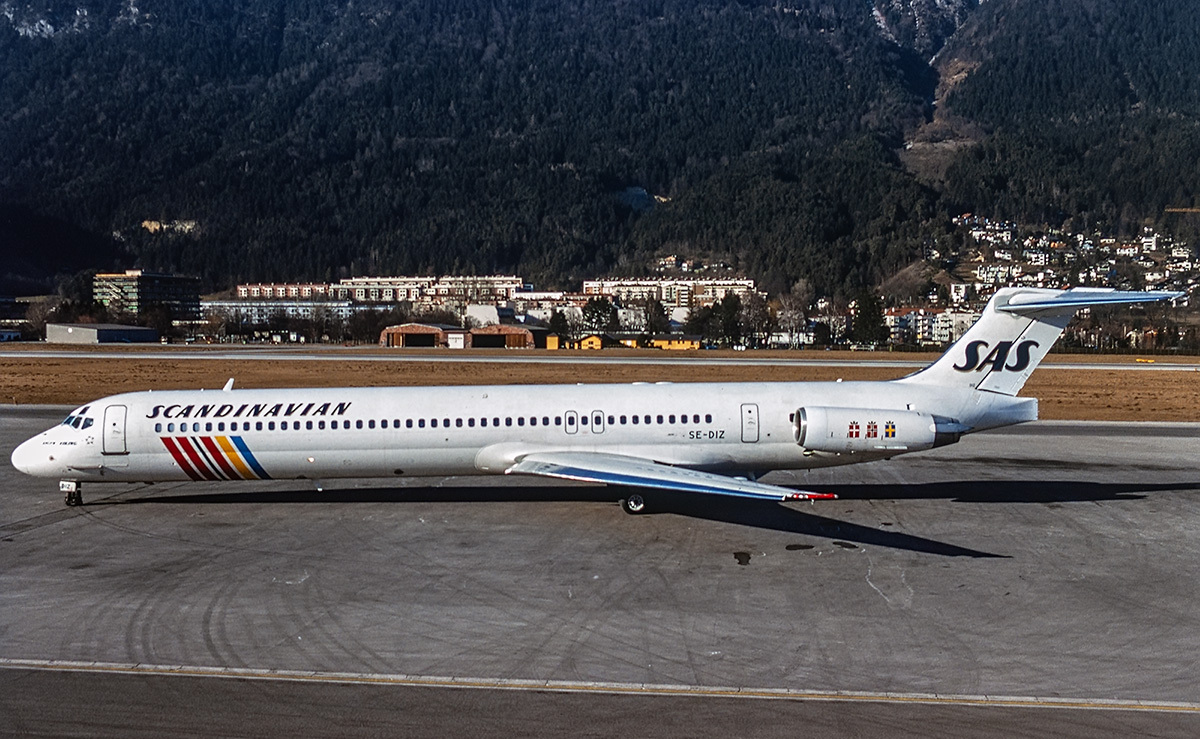
- SE-DIZ, the aircraft involved in the hijacking, seen in 1998

Hijacking
- Date: 3 November 1994
- Summary: Hijacking
- Site: Oslo Airport, Gardermoen

Aircraft
- Aircraft type: McDonnell Douglas MD-82
- Aircraft name: Sigyn Viking
- Operator: Scandinavian Airlines System
- Registration: SE-DIZ
- Flight origin: Bardufoss Airport
- Stopover: Bodø Airport
- Destination: Oslo Airport, Fornebu
- Occupants: 128
- Passengers: 122
- Crew: 6
- Fatalities: 0
- Injuries: 0
- Survivors: 128

Scandinavian Airlines System Flight 347 was a scheduled domestic flight which, on 3 November 1994, was hijacked shortly after take-off. The flight, from Bardufoss Airport via Bodø Airport to Oslo Airport, Fornebu in Norway, was operated by a McDonnell Douglas MD-82 belonging to Scandinavian Airlines System (SAS). The hijacker was Haris Keč, a Bosnian living in Norway, who made demands that Norwegian authorities help to stop the humanitarian suffering in his home country caused by the Bosnian War. No one was injured in the incident.

Keč hijacked the aircraft with 122 passengers and a crew of six in mid-air after leaving Bardufoss. The aircraft landed as scheduled at Bodø, where all women, children and seniors were let off, along with two of the cabin crew. The aircraft then departed Bodø with 77 passengers and a crew of four. It was diverted to Gardermoen, where Keč made his demands. He surrendered at about 21:00, seven hours after take-off from Bardufoss, after some of his demands had been met. He was sentenced to four years prison for the hijacking.

== Hijacking ==
SAS Flight 347 was a scheduled, domestic flight from Bardufoss Airport via Bodø Airport to Oslo Airport, Fornebu. Check-in and boarding ran as normal, without any security check. At Bardufoss, 122 people boarded the aircraft, including a large group of soldiers who were on leave of absence and on their way home to Southern Norway. Representatives from the ground handlers stated that none of the passengers acted suspiciously.

During the first leg of the flight, at about 15:00, Keč, wearing a winter coat, got up from his seat and walked to the front of the aircraft. A flight attendant stopped him. After talking for a short while, and another flight attendant came by, he was let into the cockpit. No information about the hijacking was given to the passengers until the aircraft landed at Bodø. Bodø Airport was evacuated and the aircraft parked at Bodø Main Air Station, the military section. After landing, by order of the hijacker, the passengers were informed that all women, children under 18 and people over 60 were to leave the aircraft. After this had happened, there were 77 passengers and four crew members left. The aircraft departed Bodø at about 16:00 and headed for Oslo Airport, Gardermoen, which was closed for all other traffic.

After the aircraft had landed at Gardermoen at 17:20, contact was established between Keč and the police negotiator Morten, who also had been the prime negotiator during Aeroflot Flight 137, a hijacking that also had taken place at the airport. Keč predominantly spoke English and insisted that he simply be referred to as "the Bosnian". He immediately informed that he had not hurt any of the crew or passengers, and that he was not affiliated with anyone. His immediate demands were that official representatives were to tell the world what needed to be done to solve the conflict in Bosnia. He then gave a presentation of the situation and that his only intentions were to help his countrymen. For several minutes, the conversion was about the lack of help Keč felt was being given to his home country.

Eventually Morten requested that a helicopter with medical supplies be moved next to the aircraft, for which Keč granted permission. Contact between the pair was lost and Morten had to call Keč six times before getting a response. After 15 minutes, Keč again resumed communication. He demanded that he talk to someone from the Norwegian Ministry of Foreign Affairs, and said he wanted media coverage of the incident. "I do not need publicity myself," he said. "I only need to arrange a press conference for the whole world community and the media, and that someone from the Norwegian government promises me and the world community that they will ensure that the United Nations (UN) in New York attempts to open all corridors in Bosnia to feed people in Bosnia so they can survive the winter." Keč indicated that if this did not lead to anything, he would go to the UN himself and that his friends would support him. He gave the authorities one hour to meet his demands before he would fly to another destination.

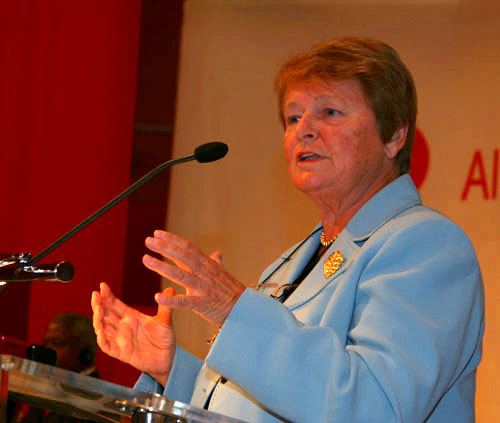
The hijacker demanded action from, among others, Norwegian Prime Minister Gro Harlem Brundtland in helping the humanitarian suffering in Bosnia

At 19:02, Keč demanded 10 tonnes (9.8 long tons; 11 short tons) of aviation fuel and food for two to three days for 80 people. Three minutes later, Morten informed Keč that the chief of police had held a press conference where Keč's demands and goals had been presented and that it had been followed by all major Norwegian newspapers and television channels. Keč responded that he did not need the chief of police, but someone from the Ministry of Foreign Affairs, such as Prime Minister Gro Harlem Brundtland, Minister of Foreign Affairs Bjørn Tore Godal or the Norwegian Ambassador to the United Nations. Morten stated that it was not possible to get the prime minister to the airport in just five minutes. Keč responded that if this did not happen within reasonable time, he would fly to another country.

At 20:04 Keč stated that he did not believe in Thorvald Stoltenberg, the minister of foreign affairs, the prime minister or any UN ambassador. Six minutes later, he demanded 25 tonnes (25 long tons; 28 short tons) of medicines for Bosnia. After a positive response from Morten, Keč stated that he needed to make Bosnia's situation known in the media. He then demanded that Godal make a speech from the European Parliament. Later it was confirmed that requested medicines would be sent by air to Bosnia the following day.

Morten then stated that they did not feel that Keč was doing things the right way. If he chose to fly to a new airport, negotiations would have to start again, perhaps in a different language. Morten urged Keč to calm down and that they wanted to solve the situation just as much as him. Keč responded by pleading for help for Bosnia. At 20:50, Keč stated "I wish to release everyone and myself. Both Bosnians and Norwegians will understand this". After confirming his surrender would occur at 21:00, Keč stated that he was "cold and calm" and that he intended to surrender without any trouble. Directed by the negotiation, Keč went to the door, opened it and was arrested.

According to the police, the passengers behaved very calmly, given the circumstances. Keč allowed several of the passengers to use their mobile telephones, allowing one of them to communicate with the police and keep Sheriff Jan Bergen updated on the situation. Anti-terror police had been called to the scene, and there were plans to storm the aircraft if the situation escalated. After the incident, the police refused to say if they would have stormed the aircraft if Keč followed through his threats to depart to another airport. During the last stages of the incident, another aircraft was parked beside the MD-82, which the police confirmed played a role towards the end of the hijacking. All communication towards the central government was made to the Norwegian Ministry of Justice, and neither the prime minister or the minister of foreign affairs was ever contacted. No weapons were found on either the aircraft nor on the hijacker.

== Aftermath ==
Haris Keč was at the time of the incident 25 years old. Born in Sarajevo, then in Yugoslavia and now in Bosnia and Herzegovina, he was a student and journalist while living in his home country. He moved to Norway on 11 July 1993, after having been granted a residential permit. After having lived in a refuge reception center in Alstahaug Municipality, he moved into his own home. He was a volunteer journalist for Landsforeningen Bosnia Hercegovina and had written several articles. Until the incident he had a clean criminal record. People who knew him described him as "sympathetic" and "resourceful", and doubted that he intended to harm anyone. A municipal immigrant consultant stated that he was "a person with initiative" who sought to get to know Norwegians and find work.

Keč was charged with three criminal offenses: the hijacking itself, and fraud and forgery related to attempting to take out 50,000 Norwegian krone from a friend's bank account. He had confessed the crime and several witnesses could confirm he had committed the crime. The incident was the second court case in Norway regarding hijacking, after Braathens SAFE Flight 139 had been hijacked by a drunk in 1985. The law permitted a sentence from 2 to 21 years prison. On 16 June 1995, Keč was sentenced to four years prison by Eidsivating Court of Appeal. After receiving the sentence, he stated to the press: "I regret hijacking the aircraft. I have apologized to the victims. Hijacking an aircraft was a completely wrong way to create attention for the situation in Bosnia."
