= Alférez FAP Alfredo Vladimir Sara Bauer Airport =

Airport in Peru

Alférez FAP Vladimir Sara Bauer Airport Andoas Airport
- IATA: AOP; ICAO: SPAS

Summary
- Airport type: Public
- Operator: CORPAC S.A.
- Serves: Andoas, Peru
- Elevation AMSL: 728 ft (222 m)
- Coordinates: 2°47′45″S 76°28′00″W

Map
- Location of airport in Peru

Runways
Direction	Length		Surface
Direction	m	ft	Surface
12/30	2,057	6,749	Asphalt
- Source: WAD GCM

Alférez FAP Alfredo Vladimir Sara Bauer Airport (official name Alférez FAP Vladimir Sara Bauer Airport) (IATA: AOP, ICAO: SPAS) is a small regional airport serving Andoas, in the northern Loreto Region of Peru. It is currently not served by any scheduled airline but it is by private and charter airlines. The airport is less than 1 kilometre (0.62 mi) in from the Pastaza River and is 20 kilometres (12 mi) downstream from the Peruvian border with Ecuador.

The airport is named after Vladimir Enrique Sara Bauer, who died in a helicopter accident on October 6, 1977.

== Airlines and destinations ==
Airlines	Destinations
Saeta Peru	Iquitos

== Accidents and incidents ==
- On May 5, 1998, the 1998 Occidental Petroleum Boeing 737 crash took place near the airport, when a chartered Boeing 737 crashed near the airport, killing 75 out of 88 occupants.

== See also ==
- Transport in Peru
- List of airports in Peru
