= ROS-Aeroprogress T-101 Grach =

Light propeller-driven fixed-wing aircraft

T-101 Grach
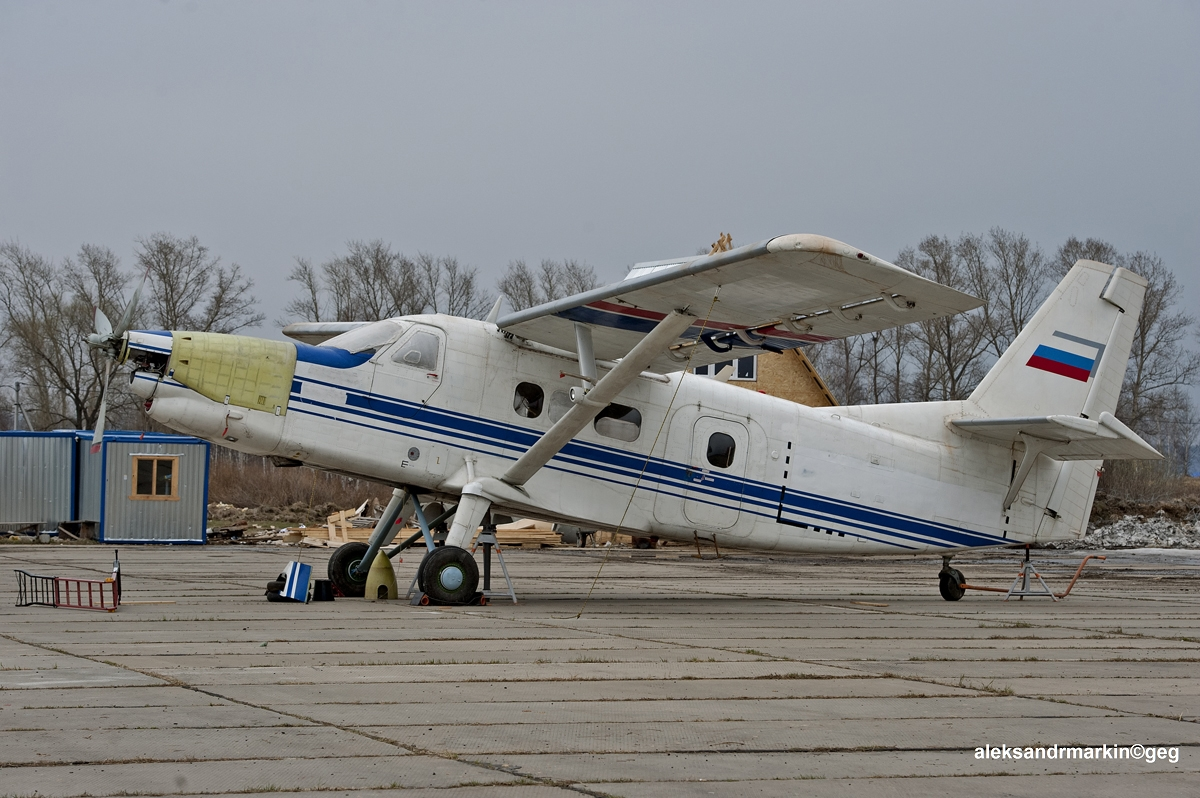
- T-101 Grach on 24 April 2013

General information
- Type: Light utility monoplane
- National origin: Russia
- Manufacturer: Krunichev OKB
- Designer: Evgeny Grunin
- Number built: 2

History
- First flight: December 7, 1994

The light multipurpose aircraft T-101 "Grach" or "Rook" in English, was based on the An-2 biplane and planned as a replacement for it. The design is focused on low cost, high reliability, and operating from unprepared airfields. The T-101 can carry 10 passengers, or transport 1600 kg of cargo. It can be used for agricultural, patrol, aerial photography, search and rescue, airborne and other utility functions. The T-101 has a strut-braced high-wing, fixed landing gear with tail wheel and a single engine in the nose.

== Specifications ==
Data from Jane's all the World's Aircraft 2004-05

General characteristics

- Crew: 1 or 2
- Length: 15.06 m (49 ft 5 in)
- Wingspan: 18.2 m (59 ft 9 in)
- Height: 4.86 m (15 ft 11 in)
- Wing area: 43.63 m^{2} (469.6 sq ft)
- Aspect ratio: 7.6
- Airfoil: TsAGI P-11-14; 3° dihedral; 3° incidence
- Empty weight: 3,330 kg (7,341 lb)
- Max takeoff weight: 5,250 kg (11,574 lb)
- Fuel capacity: 1,200 L (320 US gal; 260 imp gal) / 950 kg (2,090 lb) max
- Powerplant: 1 × Glushenkov TVD-10B (Omsk / Mars TVD-10) turboprop, 706 kW (947 shp)
- Propellers: 3-bladed AV-24N, 2.8 m (9 ft 2 in) diameter constant-speed fully-feathering reversible propeller

Performance

- Maximum speed: 300 km/h (190 mph, 160 kn) at 3,000 m (9,800 ft)
- Cruise speed: 250 km/h (160 mph, 130 kn) at 3,000 m (9,800 ft)
- Range: 700 km (430 mi, 380 nmi) with max payload: 1,270 km (790 mi; 690 nmi) with max fuel
- Service ceiling: 4,000 m (13,000 ft)
- Wing loading: 120.3 kg/m^{2} (24.6 lb/sq ft)
- Power/mass: 7.44 kg/kW (12.22 lb/shp)
