= Cessna 441 Conquest II =

Twin engine turboprop aircraft produced 1977-1986

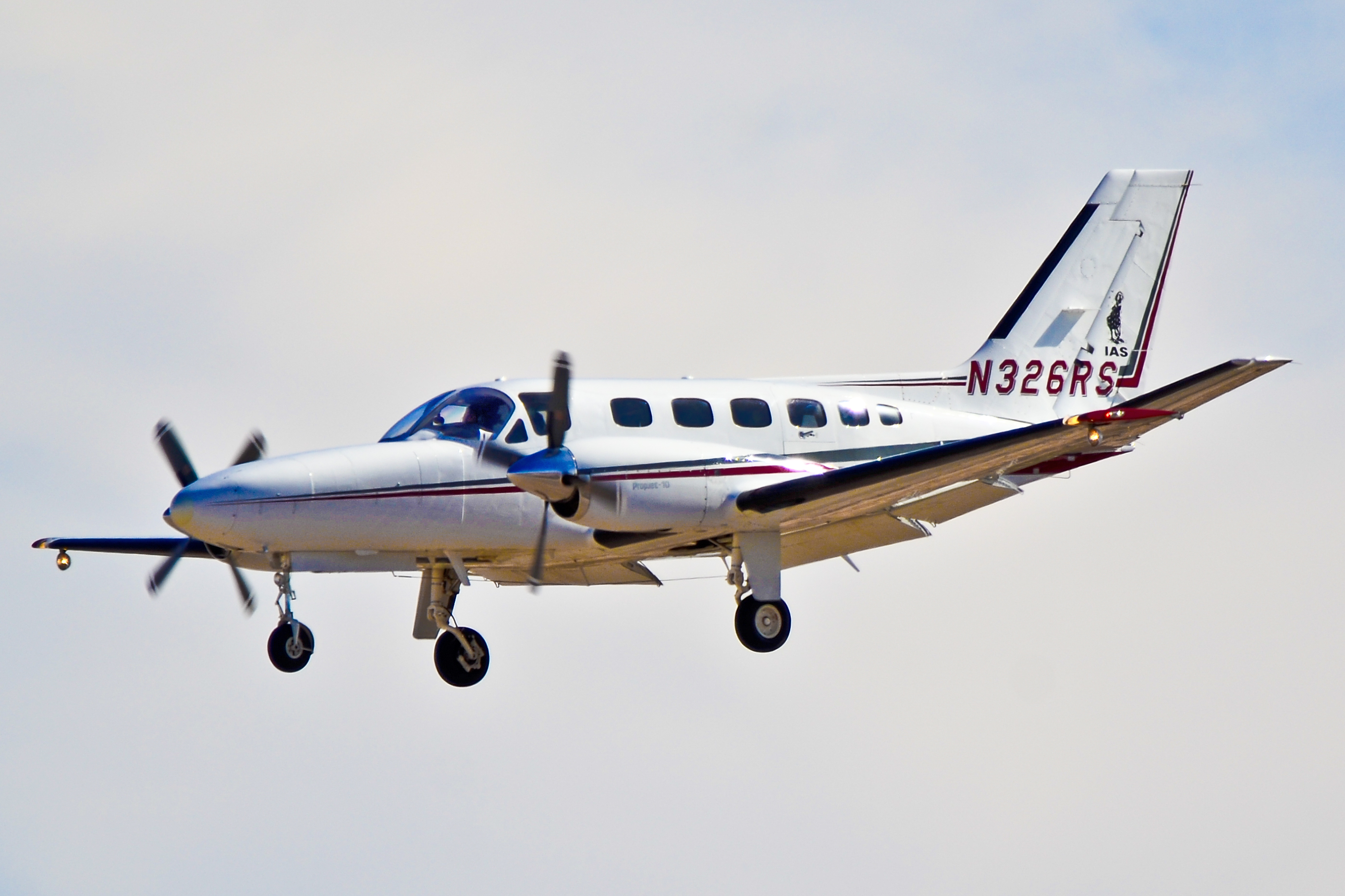

General information
- Type: Utility aircraft
- National origin: United States
- Manufacturer: Cessna
- Number built: 362

History
- Manufactured: 1977–1986
- First flight: August 26, 1975
- Developed from: Cessna 404 Titan

The Cessna 441 Conquest II was the first turboprop-powered aircraft designed by Cessna and was intended to fill the gap between its piston-engined aircraft and business jets. Development of the Model 441 began in November 1974, with the first aircraft delivered in September 1977. It is a pressurized, twin-engine turboprop development of the Cessna 404 Titan. Its ICAO aircraft type designator is C441.

== Development ==
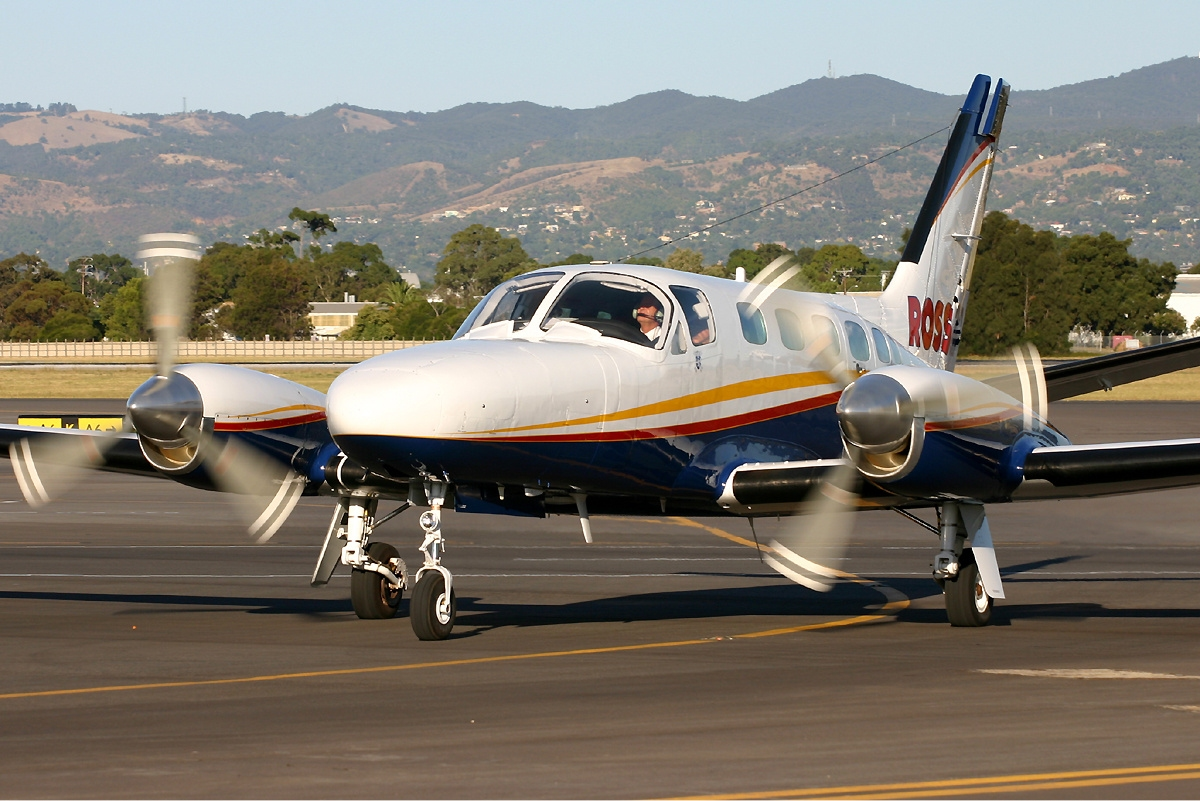
Original three-blade propellers

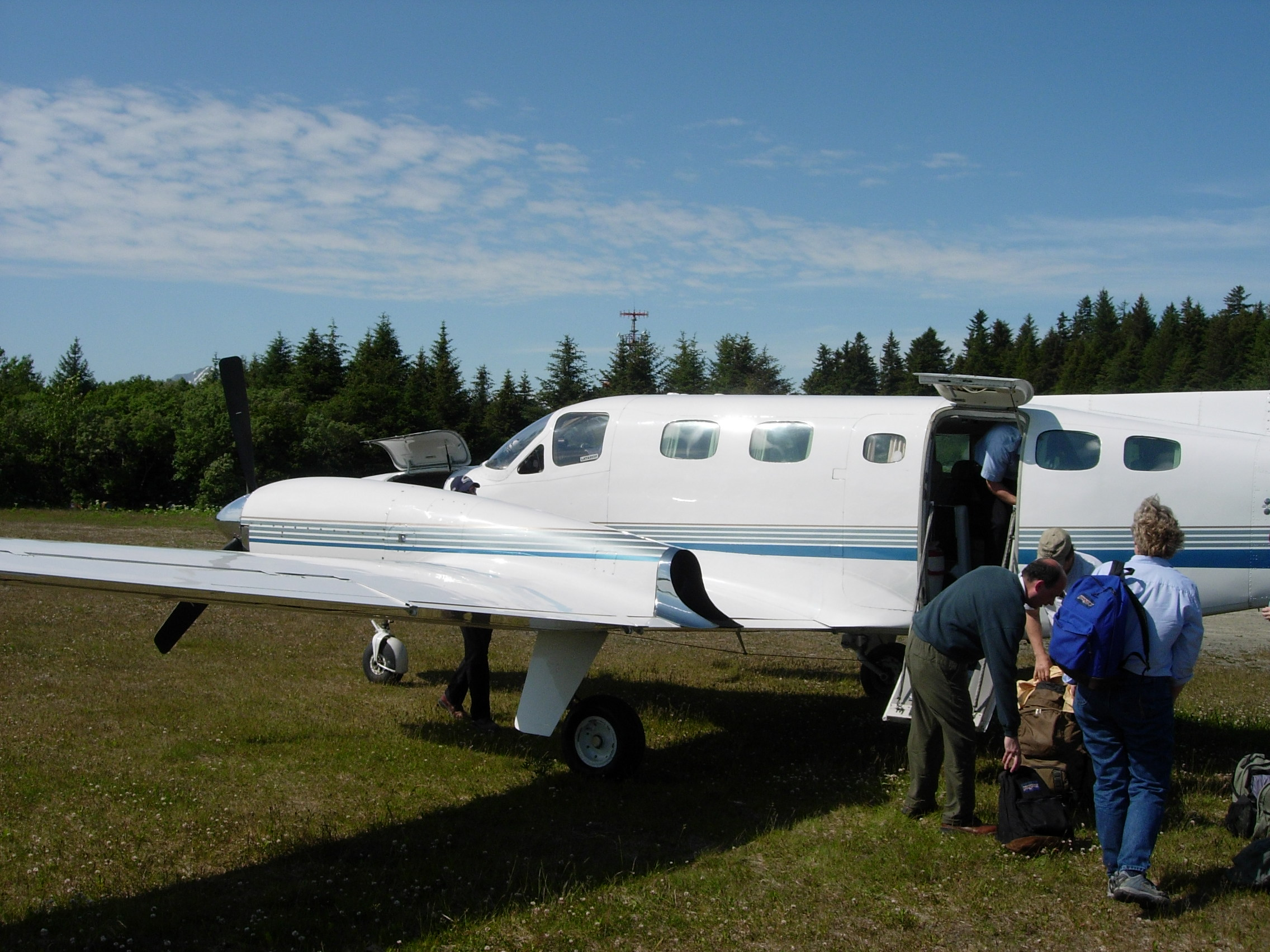
Boarding on grass

The Model 441 originated on paper in 1972 as the Model 431, powered by two 435 hp Continental GTSIO-520-X engines driving three-bladed propellers. By 1975, the design had evolved into the turboprop-powered Model 441. The Model 441 was certified by the FAA on August 19, 1977. Its high-aspect-ratio wings use bonded construction techniques.

Cessna renamed the Model 441 the Conquest II in 1983. Beginning with constructor number 195, McCauley propellers replaced the previous Hartzell units, saving a total of 23 lb (10 kg). Cessna built 362 aircraft between 1977 and 1986.

A smaller aircraft was marketed as the Cessna 425 Conquest I, itself a turbine development of the Cessna 421.

In September 2007, Cessna limited the Conquest II to 22,500 hours of air time through a Supplemental Inspection Document. This makes it effectively mandatory for US air carriers but only advisory for private operators.

== Performance ==
A midweight Cessna 441 fitted with TPE331-10 engines cruises at 316 kn (364 mph; 585 km/h) true airspeed while burning 480 lb (220 kg) of fuel per hour at flight level 290. The aircraft's maximum range is 2,000 nmi (2,300 mi; 3,700 km) at 260 kn (300 mph; 480 km/h) TAS and 310 lb (140 kg)/h at FL350, assuming TPE331-10 engines. With one pilot and six to nine seats, its 6,400–6,500 lb (2,900–2,900 kg) basic operating weight (BOW) allows a 200–300 lb (91–136 kg) payload at full fuel, but MTOW can be increased by 490 lb (220 kg) with aftermarket modifications.

== Upgrades ==
By 2008, most of the fleet had been converted to TPE331-10 engines, which offered improved performance and longer maintenance intervals. Four-bladed Hartzell propellers were also available as an aftermarket conversion, increasing ground clearance, climb rate, and cruise speed while reducing cabin noise.

== Operators ==
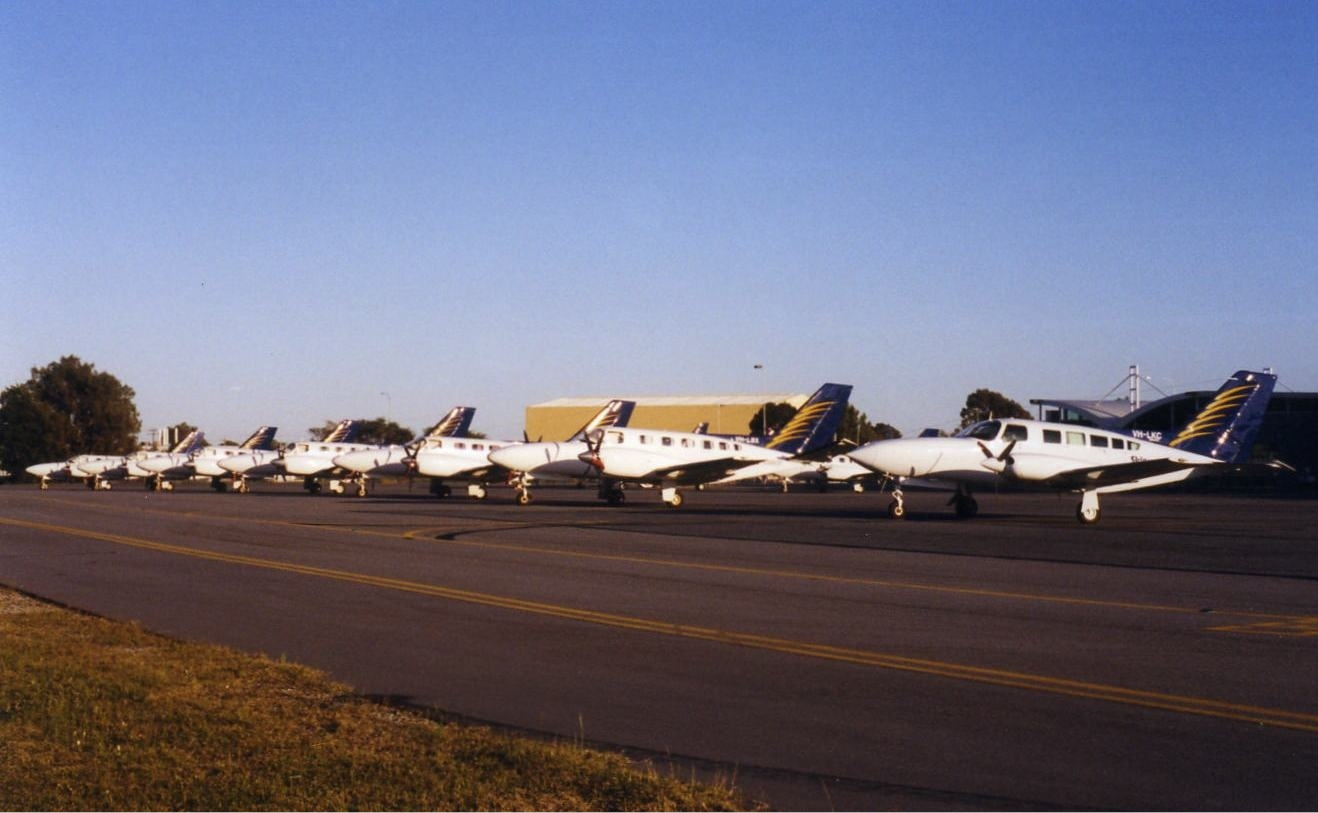
A row of Cessna 441(except the frontmost one which is C404) from Skippers Aviation in Perth, Australia

The Conquest II is operated by corporate owners, air charter operators and previously by the Royal Flying Doctor Service in Australia. Examples of the type have been exported to many countries including Austria, Australia, Canada, Ecuador, Finland, Germany, Iceland, Mexico, Norway, Peru, South Africa, Sweden and the United Kingdom.

As of May 2019, 290 aircraft remained in service, with midlife aircraft in good condition valued at approximately $750,000–$900,000, down from $1–1.9 million in 2011. As of February 2023, 265 aircraft remained in operation.

== Accidents and incidents ==
- On October 23, 1986, a Cessna 441 Conquest was involved in an accident at DuPage.
- On 26 April 1987, a Cessna 441 Conquest II (registration G-MOXY), operated by Brown Air Services Ltd, crashed south of the A30 road as a go-around was initiated after an unsafe landing gear indication on final approach. The pilot, as sole occupant, was killed.
- November 22, 1994: TWA Flight 427 collided with a Cessna 441 Conquest, registration N441KM, at the intersection of runway 30R and taxiway Romeo at St. Louis Lambert International Airport. The TWA McDonnell Douglas MD-82 was taking off for Denver and had accelerated through 80 knots (150 km/h; 92 mph) when the collision occurred. The MD-82 sustained substantial damage during the collision. The Cessna 441, operated by Superior Aviation, was destroyed. The pilot and the passenger were killed. The investigation found the Cessna 441 had entered the wrong runway for its takeoff.
- On 30 May 2017, an accident with a Rossair Cessna 441 (registered VH-XMJ) that took off from Renmark Airport and crashed approximately 4 kilometres away killed all three occupants on board.
- On June 29, 2025, a Cessna 441 Conquest II, registration N441LS, crashed after departing the Youngstown–Warren Regional Airport. The aircraft crashed two miles west of the airport minutes after departure. The pilot and five passengers on board were killed. The crash is under investigation.
- On March 19, 2026, a Cessna 441 Conquest II carrying two pilots and five passengers crashed into shallow water in Roebuck Bay shortly after taking off from Broome Airport for Mungalalu Truscott Airbase. One occupant sustained minor head injuries, and there were no fatalities.
- On August 20, 2026, a Cessna 441 Conquest operated by Security Aviation crashed near Cape Newenham. All eight passengers and crew onboard perished.

== Specifications (Conquest II) ==
Data from Jane's All The World's Aircraft 1982–83

General characteristics

- Crew: 1 or 2 pilots
- Capacity: Up to 10 passengers with one pilot; up to 9 passengers with two pilots
- Length: 39 ft 0 in (11.89 m)
- Wingspan: 49 ft 4 in (15.04 m)
- Height: 13 ft 2 in (4.01 m)
- Wing area: 253.6 sq ft (23.56 m^{2})
- Aspect ratio: 9.6:1
- Airfoil: NACA 23018 at root, NACA 23019 at tip
- Empty weight: 5,682 lb (2,577 kg)
- Gross weight: 9,850 lb (4,468 kg)
- Powerplant: 2 × Garrett TPE331-8-403S turboprops, 636 shp (474 kW) each
- Propellers: 3-bladed Hartzell or McCauley

Performance

- Maximum speed: 340 mph (550 km/h, 300 kn) at 16,000 ft (4,875 m)
- Cruise speed: 298 mph (480 km/h, 259 kn) at 35,000 ft (10,700 m)
- Stall speed: 86 mph (139 km/h, 75 kn) flaps and gear down
- Range: 2,525 mi (4,064 km, 2,194 nmi) at 35,000 ft (10,700 m)
- Service ceiling: 35,000 ft (11,000 m)
- Rate of climb: 2,435 ft/min (12.37 m/s)

Avionics

- Cessna 1000A Integrated Flight Control System

== See also ==
Aircraft of comparable role, configuration, and era

- Beechcraft King Air
- Mitsubishi Mu-2
- Piper PA-42 Cheyenne
- Swearingen Merlin
