= Meredith Thompson =

American federal agent (1961 - 1994)

Meredith Thompson (12 August 1961 – 27 August 1994) was a special agent in the Drug Enforcement Administration. She was killed in 1994, along with four other agents, during Operation Snowcap when her plane crashed in Peru.

== Early life ==
Meredith Thompson was born in Long Beach, California to Jack and Adelaide Thompson. She was the third of five children. Her father was an officer in the U.S. Navy and so they traveled around the country. She was raised in Fairfax, Virginia. In Fairfax she went to Kings Park Elementary School. While in high school at Robinson Secondary School she played for the women's basketball and softball teams.

== Education ==
After high school Meredith went to the University of South Carolina from 1981 to 1983. At USC she played varsity basketball and softball. She earned a degree in Criminal Justice.

== Early DEA ==
After college Thompson worked as a security guard at a hotel in Fairfax for a year and a half. On September 4, 1985 she joined the DEA and graduated from 40th DEA Basic Agent Class on January 31, 1986. She was sent to Columbia, South Carolina before being transferred to Miami in April 1986. While at Miami she got outstanding performance evaluations and was called a "tireless worker".

== Operation Snowcap ==
Meredith along with 14 other agents volunteered and were selected for Operation Snowcap. To meet the requirements for Op. Snowcap Meredith completed jungle training and six months of Spanish. She volunteered for two tours in Bolivia and one in Peru. After completing the tours in Bolivia she was sent to Peru. On Saturday, August 27, 1994 while she and four other agents were on a reconnaissance mission in a CASA 212 airplane, the plane crashed and all five agents were killed. The other special agents killed were Frank Fernandez, Jr., Jay W. Seale, Juan C. Vars, and Frank S. Wallace, Jr. The plane is thought to have crashed because of heavy fog in the mountainous area. Their bodies were recovered a day later and brought back to the U.S. The crash site is near Puerto Pisana, Peru.

== Dedication ==
Meredith's name is inscribed on the National Law Enforcement Memorial in Washington D.C. There is also her name and picture on the "Wall of Honor" at the DEA headquarters in Pentagon City. At USC there is a "Meredith Thompson Criminal Justice Scholarship". Meredith's name is remembered in an annual golf tournament.

Meredith Thompson was posthumously awarded with the DEA Purple Heart Award.
