= List of Japan Airlines incidents and accidents =

This article lists Japan Airlines incidents and accidents. (Bold dates indicate onboard fatalities.)

== 1950s ==
- On 9 April 1952, Mokusei, Flight 301, a Martin 2-0-2 (N90943) leased from Northwest Orient Airlines, struck Mount Mihara while operating the first leg of a Tokyo-Osaka-Fukuoka service. The crash killed all 37 occupants on board the aircraft, including four crew members and 33 passengers. Because the aircraft did not have a CVR nor an FDR, the cause was never determined.
- On 30 September 1957, Unzen, Flight 108, a Douglas DC-4-1009 (JA6011), suffered failure of all four engines after takeoff from Osaka Air Base, at an altitude of 300 ft (91 m). The aircraft force-landed in a rice field; all 57 on board were able to escape before the aircraft burned out. The cause was a malfunctioning cross-feed fuel valve.

== 1960s ==
- On 25 April 1961, Hakone, a Japan Air Lines Douglas DC-8-32 from San Francisco to Tokyo, touched down and ran off the end of the 8,900 ft (2,700 m) wet runway at Tokyo International Airport. The aircraft stopped after the main gear entered a ditch 9 ft (2.7 m) wide and 6 ft (1.8 m) deep, located 150 ft (46 m) beyond the end of the runway. The aircraft was shipped back and repaired by Douglas Aircraft Company at Long Beach, CA, United States, and returned to service as a Series 53 with a new registration (JA8008) in early 1963 and was renamed Matsushima.
- On 10 April 1962, Haruna, a Japan Air Lines Douglas C-54 from Fukuoka to Tokyo, made a wheels-up landing at Osaka. There were no casualties, however, the aircraft was damaged beyond repair and was written off.
- On 27 February 1965, Kaede, a Japan Air Lines Convair 880, was performing a low pass training near Iki Airport when, at 150 ft (46 m), descended fast and struck the runway. The aircraft slid and caught fire.
- On 25 December 1965, Kamakura, Flight 813, en route from San Francisco International Airport to Haneda Airport experienced an uncontained engine failure in its number one engine shortly after takeoff. The crew made an emergency landing at Metropolitan Oakland International Airport across the San Francisco Bay. All 41 passengers and crew managed to survive without any injuries. The cause of the accident was failure of an operator to properly secure the torque ring on the low-pressure compressor during an engine inspection and overhaul.
- On 26 August 1966, Ginza, a Japan Air Lines Convair 880 (leased from Japan Domestic Airlines) yawed left for unknown reasons after the nose lifted up during a training flight at Haneda Airport. Some 1,600 m (5,249 ft) into takeoff, the number one engine struck the runway. The aircraft left the runway and the nose pitched down again. All four engines separated as well as the nose and left landing gear; the aircraft caught fire and burned out. All five crew died.
- On 5 October 1967, a Japan Air Lines Beechcraft H18 (JA5137) crashed in a field at Murayama following engine failure while completing a training flight out of Yamagata Airport; all four crew survived.
- On 22 November 1968, Shiga, Flight 2, operated by a Douglas DC-8, accidentally landed in San Francisco Bay approximately 2.5 mi (4.0 km) short of San Francisco International Airport. The aircraft was recovered after being in the water for 55 hours. There were no injuries to the crew or to any passengers. The probable cause was "the improper application of the prescribed procedures to execute an automatic-coupled ILS approach. This deviation from the prescribed procedures was, in part, due to a lack of familiarization and infrequent operation of the installed flight director and autopilot system". The aircraft was repaired by United Airlines at San Francisco International Airport and returned to JAL in March 1969. Pilot Kohhei Asoh said that he mistakenly believed that he was landing on the runway when in fact the plane hit the water several hundred yards away.
- On 24 June 1969, Kikyo, Flight 90, operated by a Convair 880, was taking off from runway 32R at Moses Lake Grant County International Airport. The power was reduced on the number four engine during take-off, however, the aircraft continued to yaw to the right until the number four engine struck and slid off the runway. It burst into flames, killing three of the five crew members on board. The probable cause was a "delayed corrective action during a simulated critical-engine-out takeoff maneuver resulting in an excessive sideslip from which full recovery could not be effected".

== 1970s ==
=== 1970–1974 ===
- On 22 February 1970, a teenage boy, Keith Sapsford, climbed into the cargo area of a Douglas DC-8, registration JA8031, operating Flight 772 from Sydney to Tokyo. As the plane was taking off, he fell to his death. Unknowingly, a photographer photographed the event.
- On 31 March 1970, Yodo, Flight 351, operated by a Boeing 727, was hijacked by the Japanese Red Army (JRA) while en route from Tokyo to Fukuoka. The nine hijackers released all 122 passengers and seven crew members at Fukuoka Airport and Seoul's Gimpo International Airport, before proceeding to Pyongyang Sunan International Airport, where they surrendered themselves to the North Korean authorities.
- On 14 June 1972, Akan, Flight 471, operated by a Douglas DC-8, struck the banks of River Yamuna, about 20 km (12 mi) east of New Delhi's Palam International Airport (Now known as IGI Airport). The crash killed 10 out of 11 crew members, 72 out of 76 passengers on board and three people on the ground died, including famous Brazilian actress Leila Diniz and 16 Americans. Japanese investigators claimed a false glide path signal was responsible for the descent into terrain, while Indian investigators claimed it was caused by the JAL crew's disregard of laid down procedures and the abandonment of all instrument indications without properly ensuring sighting of the runway.
- On 24 September 1972, Haruna, Flight 472, operated by a Douglas DC-8 en route to Bombay, landed at Juhu Airport runway 08, instead of Bombay Airport runway 09. The aircraft overran the runway through a ditch. The visibility at the time was 2.5 km (1.6 mi), decreasing to 1.5 km (0.93 mi). There were no injuries reported, but the aircraft was written off.
- On 6 November 1972, Flight 351, a Boeing 727, was hijacked at during a flight from Tokyo to Fukuoka. Armed with a pistol, he demanded $2 million and to be flown to Cuba. The aircraft returned to Tokyo, where a DC-8 was waiting to fly him to Vancouver and on to Cuba. After releasing most of the hostages, he wanted to board the DC-8 while holding three crewmembers hostage. While entering the DC-8 he was overpowered by police.
- On 28 November 1972, Hida, Flight 446, operated by a Douglas DC-8 from Tokyo to Moscow, climbed to 100 m (330 ft) with a supercritical angle of attack. The aircraft lost height, hit the ground and burst into flames. Nine of the 14 crew members and 52 of the 62 passengers died in the accident. The probable cause was "the supercritical angle of attack was caused by either an inadvertent spoiler-extension in flight, or a loss of control following a number one or two engine failure (due to icing)".
- On 20 July 1973, Flight 404, operated by a Boeing 747-200B, was hijacked by four men and a woman, shortly after leaving Amsterdam. An accidental explosion of the explosive device the woman hijacker was carrying occurred and she was killed. The aircraft was destined for Anchorage but landed at Dubai and later took off for Damascus and Benghazi. Eventually, all the passengers and crew members were released and the aircraft was blown up on 23 July.
- On 12 March 1974, Flight 903, a Boeing 747SR, was hijacked at Naha Airport by a Japanese man demanding $56 million (much of it in $1000 bills) to study biology and geology. He carried a black suitcase, which he stated contained a bomb or weapons. Seven hours later the man was arrested by police officers disguised as airport workers. The suitcase ultimately contained 16000 yen, an airline ticket, a bottle of vitamins, a sweater and a pair of trousers.
- On 15 July 1974, a Japan Air Lines DC-8 was hijacked by a male passenger who demanded the release of the leader of the Japanese Red Army (JRA). When this demand wasn't met, he then demanded to be flown to Nagoya. After landing at Nagoya the hijacker remained on the flight deck with the pilots. Meanwhile, the flight attendants opened an emergency exit to allow the passengers to escape. Police then stormed the aircraft and arrested the hijacker.

=== 1975–1979 ===
- In February 1975, a Japan Air Lines flight from Tokyo to Paris, making fuel stops in Anchorage and Copenhagen, had 196 passengers and one stewardess, out of 343 on board, fell ill with food poisoning, 143 of whom were seriously ill enough to need hospitalising when the plane reached Copenhagen, 30 of those critically ill. The source of the food poisoning was ham contaminated with Staphylococci from the infected cuts on the fingers of a cook in Anchorage. The ham was used in omelettes which were stored at a high temperature on the plane instead of being chilled, allowing time for the bacteria to multiply and produce an exotoxin that is not destroyed by cooking. The head of Japan Airlines catering service in Anchorage committed suicide shortly afterwards and was the only fatality of the incident. It was only luck that the pilots did not eat the omelettes (their body clocks were not in the right time zone for breakfast) and become incapacitated, leading some airlines to forbid pilots eating certain foods on the passenger menu.
- On 9 April 1975, Flight 514, operated by a Boeing 747SR, was hijacked by a man who pointed a gun at a steward and demanded 30 million yen (around $100,000). After landing at Tokyo, police boarded the aircraft and overpowered the hijacker while he was speaking to the pilot. Although the hijacker fired his gun once during the incident, no one was injured.
- On 16 December 1975, Flight 422, operated by a Boeing 747-200B (JA8122), slid off the north side of the east–west taxiway at Anchorage International Airport during taxi for a takeoff on runway 06R. The aircraft weathercocked about 70 degrees to the left and slid backward down a snow-covered embankment with an average slope of -13 degrees. The aircraft came to a stop on a heading of 150 degrees on a service road about 250 ft (76 m) from, and 50 ft (15 m) below, the taxiway surface.
- On 5 January 1976, Flight 768, operated by a Douglas DC-8, was hijacked by two Filipino passengers armed with pistols and explosives at Manila Airport before takeoff. Negotiations began and all but eight passengers were released. The hijackers demanded a free flight to Japan, but when Japanese authorities refused to give the aircraft permission to land, the hijackers surrendered.
- On 13 January 1977, Cargo Flight 1045, a Douglas DC-8 freighter, stalled after liftoff from Anchorage International Airport and crashed 300 m (980 ft) past the runway. The aircraft was on a non-scheduled operation and all five occupants on board, including three crew members and two passengers, were killed. The aircraft began takeoff at the wrong position on the runway and his decision was not questioned by his fellow crew members. The captain's initial blood alcohol level was 298 mg (4.60 gr); 100 mg (1.5 gr) was the legal intoxication limit for the state of Alaska. The probable cause was "a stall that resulted from the pilot's control inputs aggravated by airframe icing while the pilot was under the influence of alcohol. Contributing to the cause of this accident was the failure of the other flightcrew members to prevent the captain from attempting the flight".
- On 27 September 1977, Flight 715, operated by a Douglas DC-8 from Hong Kong to Kuala Lumpur, struck a 300 ft (91 m) hill on approach during a thunderstorm, 4 mi (6.4 km) short of the runway, while on a VOR approach to runway 15. The fatalities for the accident included eight crew members and 26 passengers.
- On 28 September 1977, Flight 472, operated by a Douglas DC-8, was hijacked by the JRA. The aircraft was en route from Paris to Tokyo with 156 people on board, made a scheduled stop in Bombay. Shortly after taking off from Bombay, five armed JRA members hijacked the aircraft and ordered to be flown to Dacca, Bangladesh. At Dacca (now Dhaka), the hijackers took the passengers and crew hostage, demanding $6 million and the release of nine imprisoned JRA members. A chartered JAL flight carried the money and six of the nine imprisoned JRA members to Dacca, where the exchange took place on October 2. The hijackers released 118 passengers and crew members, and all remaining hostages were freed later.
- On 2 June 1978, Flight 115, operated by a Boeing 747SR, suffered a tailstrike while landing at Osaka; two passengers were seriously injured and another 23 suffered minor injuries. Although the aircraft was repaired in June and July 1978, it was lost in 1985 in the crash of JAL 123 (The worst single-aircraft air disaster) .
- On 23 November 1979, a Japan Air Lines McDonnell Douglas DC-10 was hijacked shortly after takeoff from Osaka by a male passenger. He used a plastic knife and a bottle opener and demanded to be flown to the Soviet Union. The aircraft diverted to Narita Airport to refuel; the hijacker was overpowered before the aircraft was refueled.

== 1980s ==
- On 9 February 1982, Flight 350, operated by a McDonnell Douglas DC-8, was on scheduled passenger flight from Fukuoka to Tokyo. The aircraft crashed on approach into the shallow water of Tokyo Bay, 510 m (1,670 ft) short of the runway 33R threshold. The nose and the right hand wing separated from the fuselage. Among the 166 passengers and eight crew, 24 passengers were killed. The report shows that the captain had experienced some form of a mental aberration. He was prosecuted, but he was found not guilty by reason of insanity.
- On 17 September 1982, Flight 792, operated by a McDonnell Douglas DC-8, took off from Shanghai at 13:57. Nine minutes later, the crew heard a noise coming from the lower middle part of the aircraft. This was immediately followed by a hydraulic low level warning; a hydraulic reservoir air low pressure warning; a complete loss of hydraulic system pressure; abnormal flap position indications; and a complete loss of air brake pressure. The flight crew decided to return to Shanghai for an emergency landing on runway 36. The aircraft overran the runway and came to a rest in a drainage ditch.
- On 12 August 1985, Flight 123, operated by a Boeing 747SR (the same aircraft aforementioned involved in a tailstrike incident in 1978), bound for Osaka, lost all its hydraulic flight control systems shortly after takeoff after the rear pressure bulkhead exploded, ripping off the vertical stabilizer and, after attempting to limp back to Tokyo, crashed into Mount Takamagahara near Gunma Prefecture. It was the deadliest single-aircraft disaster in history (and the second deadliest accident in history, since the 1977 Tenerife airport disaster); 520 out of 524 people on board died, including the famous singer Kyu Sakamoto.
- On 17 November 1986, the crew of Cargo Flight 1628, operated by a Boeing 747-200F, while en route to Tokyo, claimed to have spotted two unidentified flying objects (UFOs) at the Reykjavik to Anchorage section of the flight. They both had two rectangular arrays of nozzles / thrusters. When the UFOs were closer to the aircraft, the crew felt the heat coming from the nozzles / thrusters. They requested the air traffic controller in Anchorage, Alaska to send other close flights to witness the UFOs. A United Airlines flight came near the scene, but the crew did not report anything near Flight 1628. The unusual sight was for just under an hour and it ended near Denali.

== 1990s ==
- On 2 October 1991, a Japan Airlines Boeing 747-200B was climbing through FL165 when the force from a hot liquid released from a burst pipe in the pressurization system, and blew a 100 cm × 70 cm (3.3 ft × 2.3 ft) hole in the fuselage beneath the port wing. The captain dumped fuel and returned safely to Tokyo.
- On 31 March 1993, Cargo Flight 46E, a Boeing 747-100 operated by Evergreen International Airlines, experienced severe turbulence at an altitude of about 2,000 ft (610 m) after departure about 12:24 local time, resulted in dynamic multi-axis lateral loadings that exceeded the ultimate lateral load-carrying of the number two engine pylon. This caused the number two engine to separate from the aircraft; the number one engine was maintained at emergency/maximum power and the aircraft landed safely back at Anchorage International Airport at 12:45.
- On 8 June 1997, Etupirka, Flight 706, operated by a McDonnell Douglas MD-11 from Hong Kong to Nagoya, descended through approximately 17,000 ft (5,200 m) over the Shima Peninsula for an approach to Nagoya. It then experienced abrupt and abnormal altitude changes, which injured five passengers and seven crew members. The captain was indicted for an alleged error in piloting the MD-11 aircraft, and then blamed for the death of a cabin crew member 20 months after the incident. The Nagoya District Court later acquitted the 54-year-old captain, Koichi Takamoto, on 31 July 2004.

== 2000s ==
- On 31 January 2001, in the Japan Airlines mid-air incident, Flight 907, operated by a Boeing 747-400D, and Flight 958, operated by a McDonnell Douglas DC-10, had a near miss incident near Yaizu, Shizuoka.
- On 12 November 2001, Flight 047, operated by a Boeing 747-400 en route to Tokyo from São Paulo with a stopover at JFK in New York City, produced the wake turbulence that was the initiating factor in the loss of American Airlines Flight 587; this was neither the fault of nor had any effect on the Japan Airlines flight.
- On 11 May 2009, Flight 61, operated by a Boeing 747-400, prepared to depart from Los Angeles International Airport to Narita International Airport before an empty metal baggage container was sucked into the outer left-side engine. The cause of the incident was believed to be a baggage cart being parked or driven too closely to the aircraft. None of the 245 passengers or 18 crew members were injured in the incident, and Japan Airlines created flight arrangements for those affected. The plane was towed back to the terminal and taken out of service for examination.

== 2010s ==
- On 7 January 2013, ground crew workers noticed smoke coming from the battery compartment in a parked Japan Airlines Boeing 787 Dreamliner at the gate. This fire was caused by overcharged lithium-ion batteries, eventually leading to the grounding of the worldwide Boeing 787 fleet and subsequent redesign of the battery systems.
- On 28 October 2018, Japan Airlines pilot Katsutoshi Jitsukawa, 42, was arrested at Heathrow Airport for being under the influence after failing a breathalyzer test. He pleaded guilty to exceeding the alcohol limit on 1 November.

== 2020s ==
- On 4 December 2020, Flight 904, operated by a Boeing 777-200 from Okinawa to Tokyo Haneda, suffered a fan blade failure in one of its two PW4084 engines. None of the 189 occupants on board were injured in the incident.
- On 2 January 2024, Flight 516, operated by an Airbus A350-941 registered as JA13XJ, flying from Sapporo to Tokyo, collided with a Japan Coast Guard DHC-8-315Q MPA (JA722A) on the runway at Haneda Airport. Both aircraft caught fire and were written off. All 379 occupants onboard Flight 516 were evacuated, while five of the six crew members aboard the Coast Guard aircraft were killed; the pilot escaping with critical injuries. Flight 516 was the first time in 38 years that a Japan Airlines aircraft was written off. It was also the first serious accident and hull loss of an Airbus A350 since the type's introduction in 2015 and resulted in a total hull loss of the aircraft. The Dash 8 was waiting to depart to Niigata to deliver supplies in response to the Noto Peninsula earthquake.
- In December 2024, two pilots violated the company's alcohol consumption rules before a flight from Melbourne to Tokyo. As a result, President Mitsuko Tottori and Chairman Yuji Akasaka received a 30% pay cut for two months as punishment, with Akasaka also being removed from his role as safety controller. Three other executives in flight operations and safety management departments are also facing disciplinary action. The incident caused a three-hour delay to the flight after the pilots tested positive for alcohol during a pre-flight check at their hotel. JAL's internal guidelines prohibit drinking within 12 hours of boarding and require pilots to have a residual alcohol concentration equivalent to four drinks or less 12 hours before their shift. In response to the incident, JAL submitted preventive measures to the transport ministry, including creating a list of crew members prone to heavy drinking for monitoring purposes.
- On 5 February 2025, Flight 68, operated by a Boeing 787-9 from Narita International Airport to Seattle–Tacoma International Airport, struck a parked Delta Air Lines Boeing 737 after landing. No injuries were reported.
- On 15 December 2025, the right wing of a towed Hi Fly Malta Airbus A330 collided with a Japan Airlines Airbus A350-1000 that was parked for maintenance at John F. Kennedy International Airport following its arrival from Haneda as Flight 4. The A350 sustained substantial damage to its cockpit windows.
