= 1966 Japan Air Lines Convair 880 crash =

Aviation accident in Tokyo, Japan

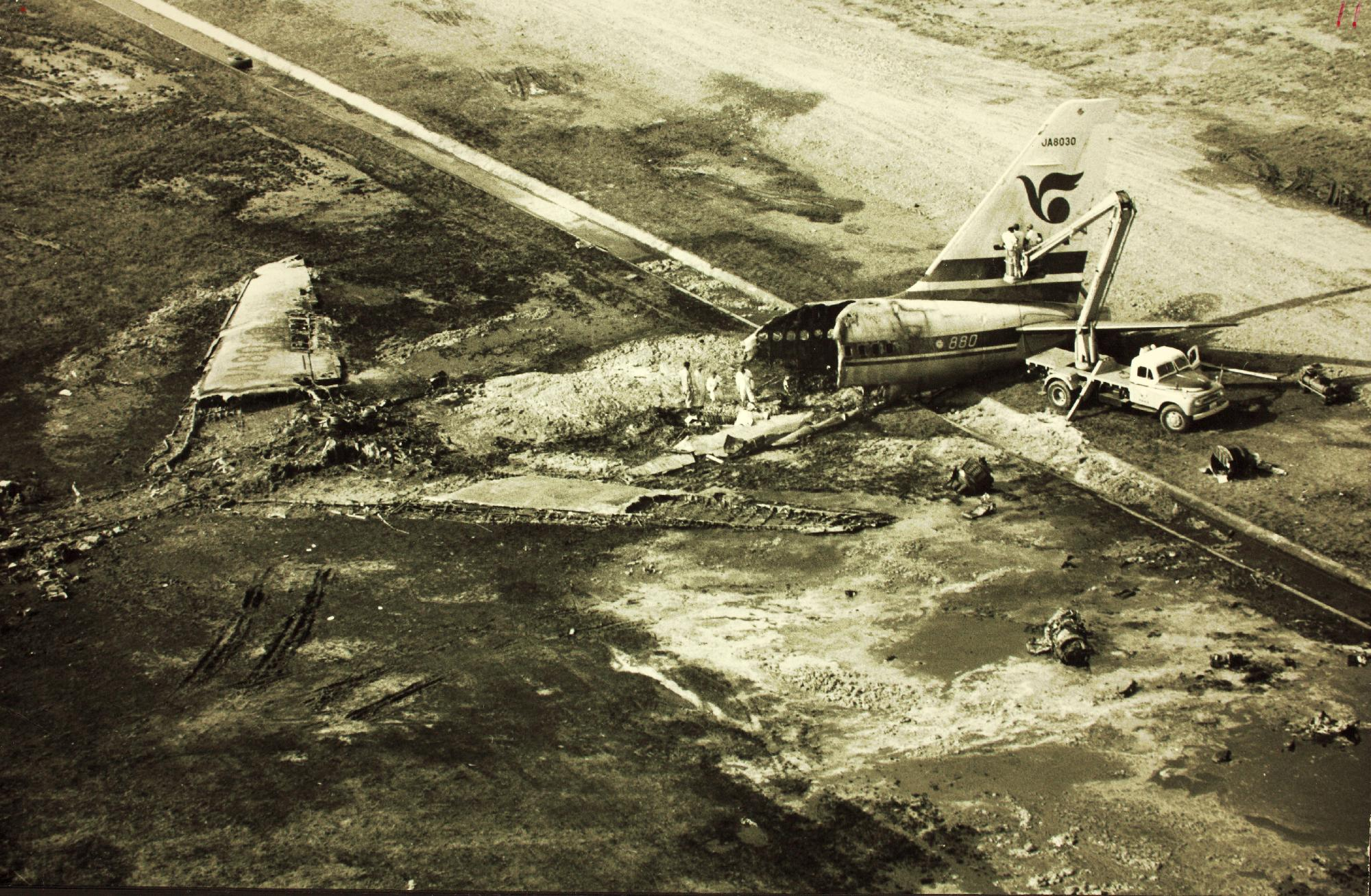
- The wreckage of the aircraft

Accident
- Date: 26 August 1966
- Summary: Crashed on takeoff due to pilot error
- Site: Haneda Airport, Tokyo, Japan

Aircraft
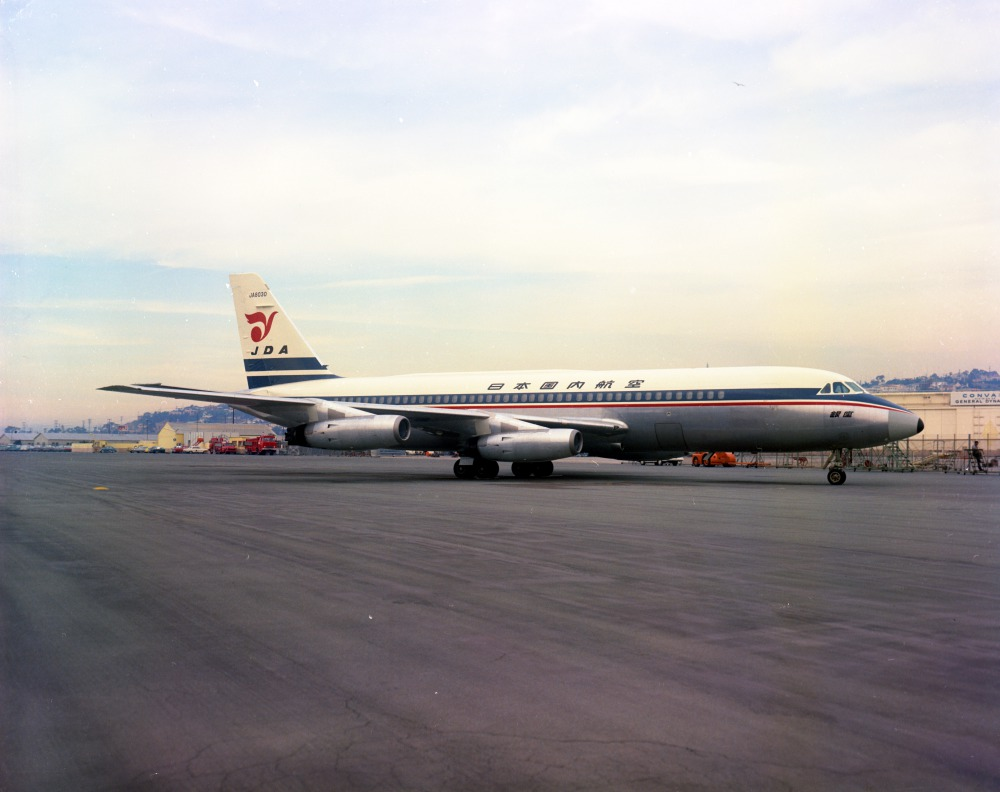
- JA8030, the aircraft involved in the accident, seen in 1965
- Aircraft type: Convair 880-22M
- Aircraft name: Ginza
- Operator: Japan Air Lines leased from Japan Domestic Airlines
- Registration: JA8030
- Flight origin: Haneda Airport, Tokyo, Japan
- Destination: Haneda Airport, Tokyo, Japan
- Occupants: 5
- Crew: 5
- Fatalities: 5
- Survivors: 0

On 26 August 1966, a Japan Air Lines Convair 880-22M crashed and burst into flames shortly after takeoff from Haneda Airport. There were no passengers on board as it was a crew training flight, but four employees from the airline and one from the Ministry of Transport (currently the Ministry of Land, Infrastructure, Transport and Tourism) were on board. All five people, including one station employee, were killed.

== Background ==
=== Aircraft ===
The aircraft involved, was a Convair 880, registered as JA8030 (Convair production number: 22-00-45M, Ginza), was leased from Japan Domestic Airlines to Japan Air Lines, and ownership remained with Japan Air Lines. This aircraft was manufactured on 24 July 1961. It had logged 5290 hours and 33 minutes of flying time. On 1 July 1966, the aircraft was held on lease to Japan Air Lines mainly for flight training purposes. The aircraft was not equipped with flight recorders.

=== Crew ===
In command was 44-year-old Captain Manshichi Harano who had logged 8446 hours and 52 minutes of flying time, 1265 hours and 20 minutes of which were logged on the Convair 880. He joined Japan Air Lines on 1 April 1956. His co-pilot was 34-year-old First Officer Shuji Daikoku. He logged a total of 2618 hours and 52 minutes of flying time, including 431 hours and 19 minutes logged on the Convair 880. He joined Japan Air Lines on 24 June 1965. The examiner pilot was 29-year-old Yoshiomi Motouchi. He had logged 2397 hours and 11 minutes of flying time, including 368 hours and 51 minutes logged on the Convair 880. He joined Japan Air Lines on 7 October 1963. The 26-year-old flight engineer was Terumitsu Fujimaki. He had logged 841 hours and 4 minutes of flying time, 408 hours and 23 minutes of which were logged on the Convair 880. He joined Japan Air Lines on 1 July 1963.

== Accident ==
On 26 August 1966, Ginza made a round trip flight from Haneda to Hokkaido in the morning, and in the afternoon it was scheduled to conduct takeoff and landing training at Haneda Airport. On that day, Runway A (old) at Haneda Airport was closed due to construction, so the plane was attempting to take off from the parallel Runway 33R. This flight was for the pilot to test a limited model change.

At 14:28 local time, the No. 4 engine, the right outer-most engine, was manually shut down during the takeoff due to one engine critical cut out, which is one of the test items (takeoff is continued based on the assumption that one engine fails during takeoff). This maneuver reduced the leeward outer thrust to zero, and the aircraft suddenly began to skid to one side. According to eyewitness accounts, the plane began to veer to the right from Runway 33R, its left wheel detached, and the plane turned left between Runway 33R and A, and the right wheel also detached. The impact caused the plane to land on its torso, skid for about 2100 meters, and burst into flames. The plane was completely destroyed before the crew had time to escape.

The causes of the accident are said to be the difficult-to-operate aircraft, as well as mistakes made by the trainees, which led to the crash shortly after takeoff.

== Aftermath ==
On 26 August 1968, the Japanese Civil Aviation Bureau could not determine why the aircraft "uncontrollably" yawed to the left.

== See also ==
- List of Japan Airlines incidents and accidents
