= Japan Air Lines Flight 813 =

1965 aviation accident over California

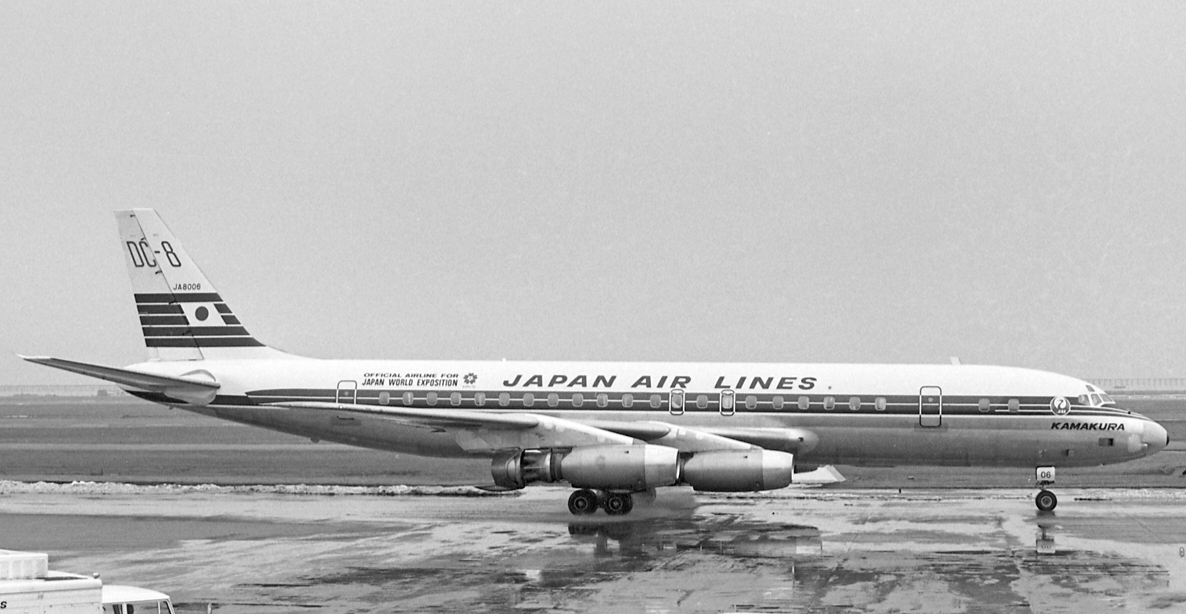
- JA8006, the aircraft involved in the accident, seen in 1969

Accident
- Date: December 25, 1965
- Summary: Uncontained engine failure due to maintenance error
- Site: Over South San Francisco, California, United States

Aircraft
- Aircraft type: Douglas DC-8-33
- Aircraft name: Kamakura
- Operator: Japan Air Lines
- IATA flight No.: JL813
- ICAO flight No.: JAL813
- Call sign: JAPAN AIR 813
- Registration: JA8006
- Flight origin: San Francisco International Airport, San Mateo County, California, United States
- Stopover: Honolulu International Airport, Honolulu, Hawaii, United States
- Destination: Haneda Airport, Tokyo, Japan
- Occupants: 41
- Passengers: 31
- Crew: 10
- Fatalities: 0
- Survivors: 41

On December 25, 1965, Japan Air Lines Flight 813 en route from San Francisco International Airport to Haneda Airport experienced an uncontained engine failure in its number one engine shortly after takeoff. The crew made an emergency landing at Metropolitan Oakland International Airport across the San Francisco Bay. All 41 passengers and crew managed to survive without any injuries.

== Background ==
=== Aircraft ===
The aircraft involved in the accident was a Douglas DC-8-33 and it was manufactured on May 2, 1961. The serial number was 45626. It had 13,423 flight hours and had logged 21.5 flight hours since its last inspection. The aircraft registration was JA8006 and it was powered by 4 Pratt and Whitney JT4 A-9 engines.

The No. 1 engine, which exploded, had been overhauled at Japan Air Lines Tokyo factory in August 1965, and was installed on the aircraft on November 20, 1965, returning to service on December 24, 1965. During the overhaul, fatigue cracks were found in the torque ring of the low-pressure compressor, so the ring was replaced.

=== Crew and passengers ===
- The captain of the flight was 40-year-old Tsuneo Kato. He had a total of 8,031 flight hours and 909 hours of experience on the DC-8. He was also qualified to fly the Convair 880, Douglas DC-4, Douglas DC-6, and Douglas DC-7. Captain Kato would later be involved in the hijacking of Japan Air Lines Flight 351.
- The first officer was 30-year-old Shinsuke Jinnaka. He had a total of 7,768 flight hours and 234 hours of experience on the DC-8. He was qualified to fly the Douglas DC-4, Douglas DC-6, and Douglas DC-7.
- The flight engineer was 41-year-old Harold L. Brown. He had 14,077 total flight hours and 1,560 hours in the DC-8. He was qualified to fly the DC-8, Douglas DC-6, and Douglas DC-7.
- The navigator was 41-year-old Susumu Kohno. He had a total of 7,305 flight hours and had 2,715 hours of experience on the DC-8.

There were 31 passengers and 10 crew onboard the aircraft, which included four deadheads.

== Accident ==
At 13:08 PST, the aircraft took off from Runway 01 at San Francisco International Airport. At 13:11, while climbing at 270 knots (500 km/h) and approximately 4,500 feet (1,400 m), the No. 1 engine exploded. The aircraft vibrated violently and rolled to the left. The pilots immediately performed the engine failure checklist, and the vibrations subsided. There was a fire in the No. 1 engine, but the engine was not visible from the cockpit, and no fire warnings were issued. The pilots learned of the fire through a flight attendant's report.

Within a minute of the engine explosion, the pilot declared a mayday and requested permission to make an emergency landing, at which point lateral control was becoming difficult and hydraulic pressure was decreasing.

At 13:16, the captain decided to head for Runway 29 at Metropolitan Oakland International Airport, which offered a more direct approach, rather than making a left turn to return to San Francisco International Airport. At 13:20, the aircraft successfully landed on Runway 29. None of the 41 occupants onboard were injured.

== Investigation ==
=== Aircraft damage ===
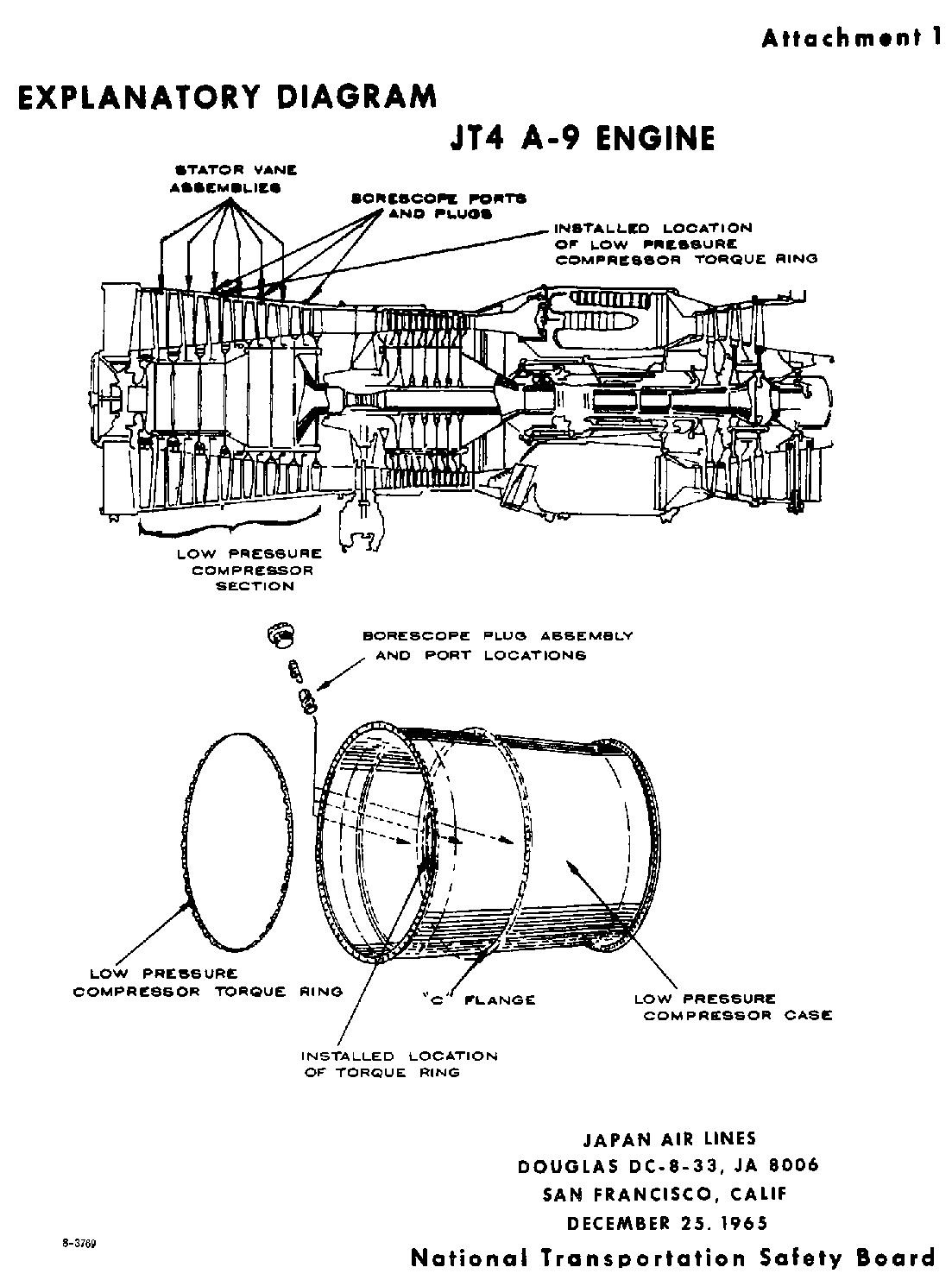
Structural diagram of the Pratt and Whitney JT4 A-9 engine

The No. 1 engine was severely damaged after the explosion and subsequent fire, and nearly half of the left aileron had been torn off by the explosion, while hydraulic pipes and the No. 2 engine pylon were damaged by flying debris.

The investigation revealed that the outer casing of the No. 1 engine's low-pressure compressor had been shattered and separated from the engine, the forward section of the engine cowling had also been separated, and all stages of the low-pressure compressor were destroyed.

=== Final report ===
The National Transportation Safety Board (NTSB), which investigated the accident, determined that the cause of the accident was failure of an operator to properly secure the torque ring on the low-pressure compressor during an engine inspection and overhaul.
