= Convair 880 =

American four-engine jet airliner (1960–1990s)

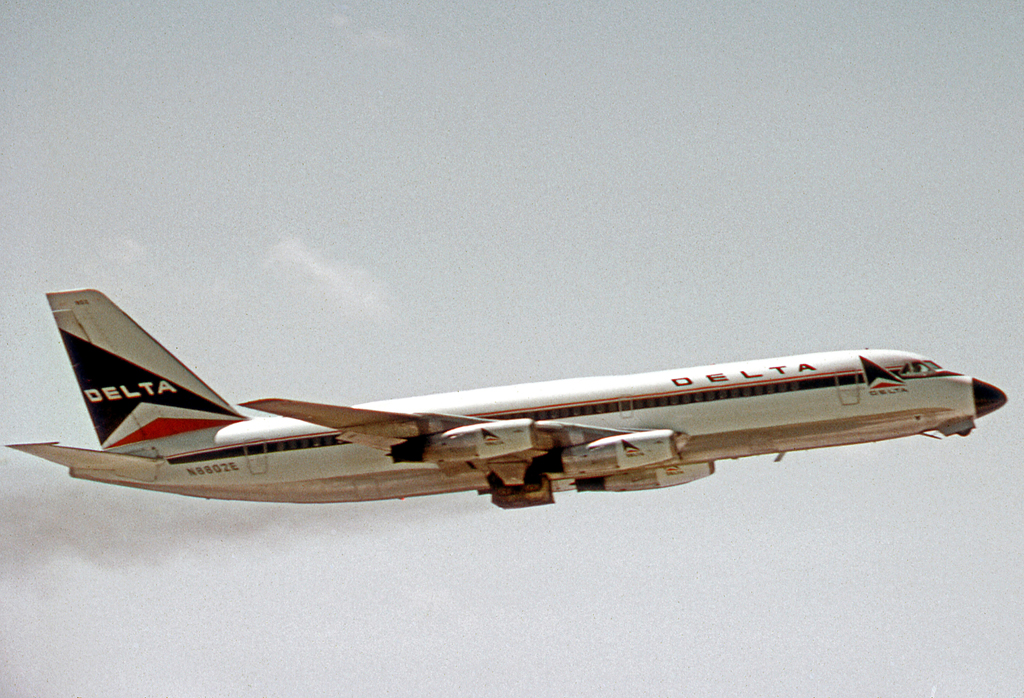
- The Convair 880 is a low-wing airliner with four underwing turbojets.

General information
- Type: Narrow-body jet airliner
- National origin: United States
- Manufacturer: Convair
- Status: Retired
- Primary users: Trans World Airlines Delta Air Lines; Japan Airlines; Swissair
- Number built: 65

History
- Manufactured: 1959–1962
- Introduction date: May 1960 with Delta Air Lines
- First flight: January 27, 1959
- Retired: 1998
- Developed into: Convair 990 Coronado

The Convair 880 is a retired American narrow-body jet airliner produced by the Convair division of General Dynamics. It was designed to compete with the Boeing 707 and Douglas DC-8 by being smaller but faster, a niche that failed to create demand. When it was first introduced, some in aviation circles claimed that at 615 mph (990 km/h), it was the fastest jet transport in the world. Only 65 Convair 880s were produced over the lifetime of the production run from 1959 to 1962, and General Dynamics eventually withdrew from the airliner market after considering the 880 project a failure. The Convair 990 Coronado was a stretched and faster variant of the 880.

== Development ==
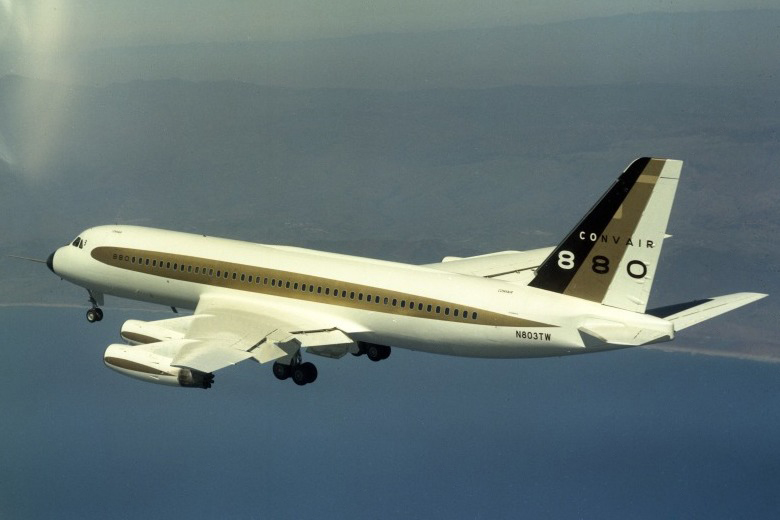
A Convair 880 prototype. The model made its maiden flight on 27 January 1959.

Convair began development of a medium-range commercial jet in April 1956, to compete with announced products from Boeing and Douglas. Initially the design was called the Skylark, but the name was later changed to the Golden Arrow, then Convair 600 and then finally the 880, both numbers referring to its top speed of 600 mph (970 km/h) or 880 ft/s (268 m/s). It was powered by General Electric CJ-805-3 turbojets, a civilian version of the J79 which powered the Lockheed F-104 Starfighter, McDonnell Douglas F-4 Phantom, and Convair B-58 Hustler.

The first example of the Model 22 FAA Type Certificate, initial production version (no prototype was built) made its maiden flight on 27 January 1959. After production started, the Federal Aviation Administration mandated additional instrumentation, which Convair added by placing a "raceway" hump on the top of the fuselage, rather than ripping apart the interiors over the wing area. The final assembly of the 880 and 990 took place at the Convair facilities in San Diego, California.

== Design ==
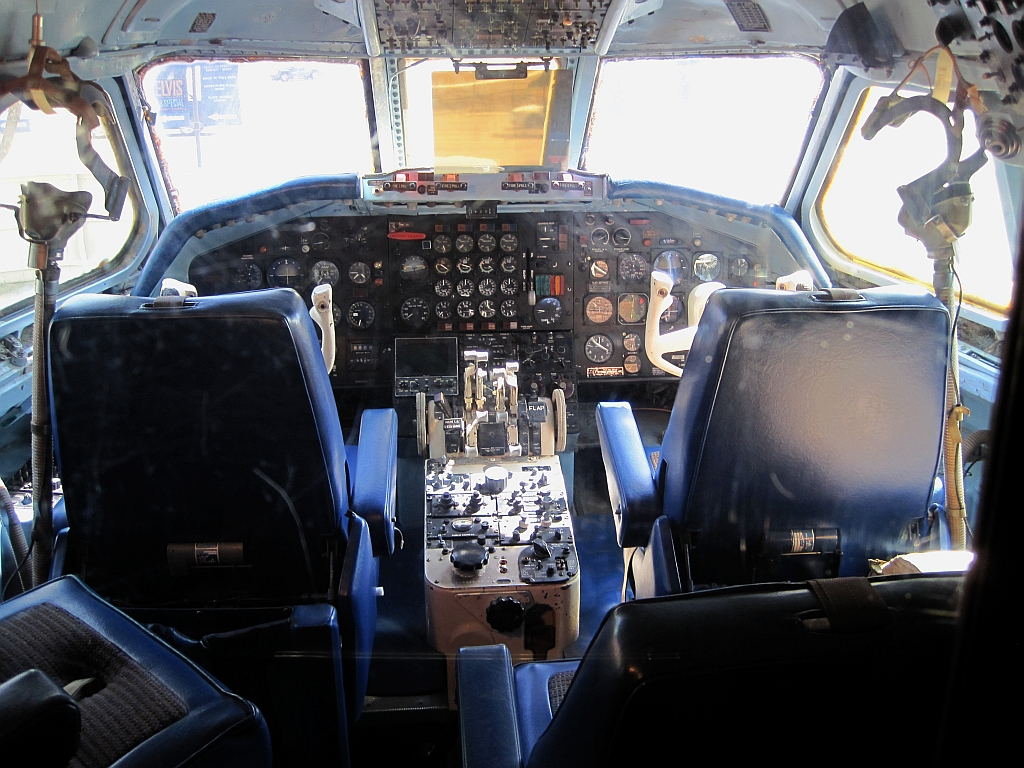
Convair 880 cockpit

The airliner never became widely used, and the production line shut down after only three years. The 880's five-abreast seating made it unattractive to airlines, while Boeing was able to outcompete it with the Boeing 720, which could be sold at a significantly lower price, as it was a minimal modification of the existing 707. In addition, the General Electric engines had a higher specific fuel consumption than the Boeing's Pratt & Whitney JT3Cs.

General Dynamics lost around $185 million over the lifetime of the project, although some sources estimate much higher losses. The aircraft were involved in 17 accidents and five hijackings.

A modified version of the basic 880 was the "-M" version, which incorporated four leading-edge slats per wing, Krueger leading-edge flaps between the fuselage and inboard engines, power-boosted rudder, added engine thrust, increased fuel capacity, stronger landing gear, greater adjustment to seating pitch, and a simpler overhead compartment arrangement.

A more major modification to the 880 became the Convair 990, produced in parallel with the 880-M between 1961 and 1963. Swissair named theirs Coronado, after an island off the San Diego coast and where the first 990 landed.

== Operational history ==
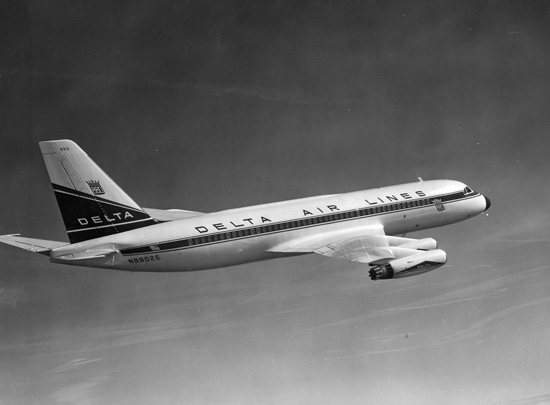
The 880 entered service with Delta Air Lines in May 1960.

The design entered service with Delta Air Lines in May 1960, slightly modified as the 880-22M, having newer-version 805-3B engines. The 880s were flown by Cathay Pacific, Delta, Japan Airlines, Northeast Airlines, Swissair, TWA, and VIASA.

As they left commercial service, many 880s were bought by American Jet Industries for various uses. One example was converted to freighter use in 1974, and flew until 1982 with various companies. Another was used to train FAA flight examiners until it was destroyed by a minor explosion in the cargo hold in 1995. Most of the remaining examples were scrapped by 2000.

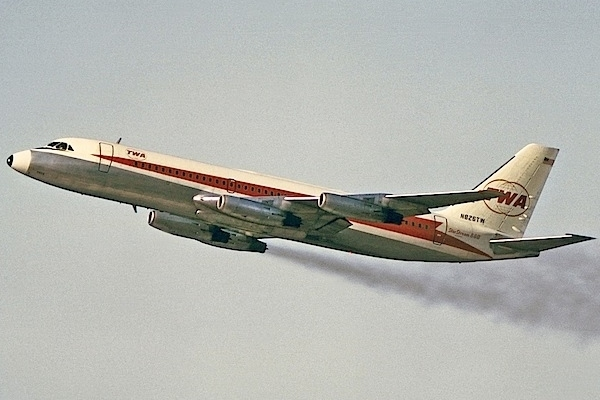
TWA Convair 880

A former TWA Convair 880, registered as N807AJ, was a notable survivor of the type. After being stored at Mojave Air and Space Port for 11 years, it was returned to flying condition and made its final flight in 1991 to Atlantic City, New Jersey. There, it was handed over to the Federal Aviation Administration (FAA) for use as a fire trainer and for non-destructive fire testing. The aircraft remained in this role until it was eventually dismantled in late 2007.

The United States Navy acquired one 880-M in 1980, modifying it as an in-flight tanker. It had been purchased new from Convair by the FAA, and used for 18 years. Unofficially designated UC-880, it was assigned to the Naval Air Test Center at NAS Patuxent River, Maryland, and employed in Tomahawk cruise missile testing and aircraft refueling procedures. The UC-880 was damaged in a cargo-hold explosive decompression test at NAS Patuxent River, Maryland, in 1995. The aircraft was judged to still have been controllable using backup systems had the decompression occurred in flight.

== Operators ==
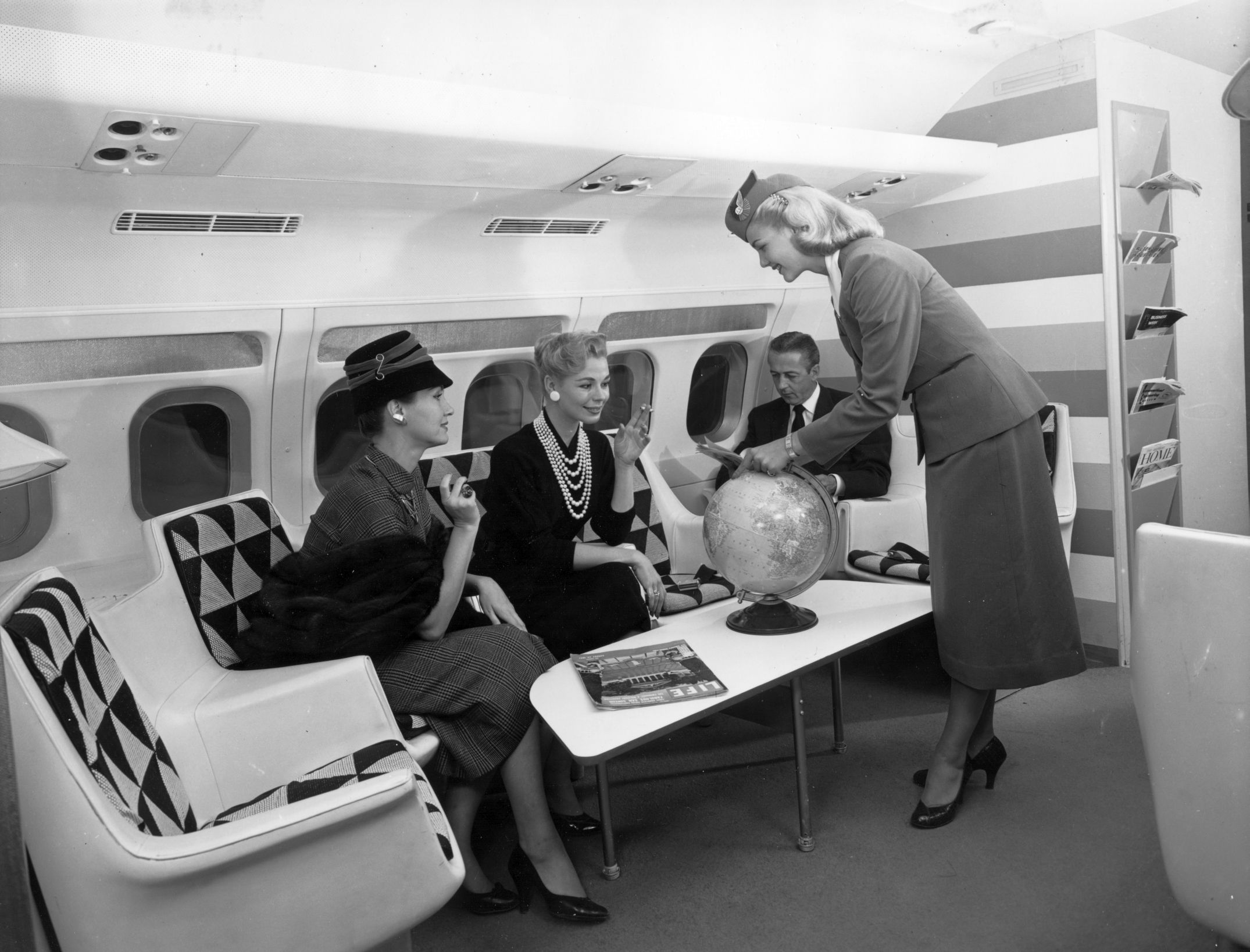
Lounge interior of Trans World Airlines, the 880 major operator

=== Civil operators ===
- Air Malta
- Air Viking (leased)
- Airtrust Singapore (leased)
- Alaska Airlines
- American Jet Industries
- Bahamas World
- Cathay Pacific♠
- Civil Air Transport♠ (CAT)
- Central American International (freighter)
- Delta Air Lines♠
- Elvis Presley Enterprises (this aircraft is on display at Graceland in Memphis)
- Federal Aviation Administration♠ (FAA)
- Flying Fish Company
- Hughes Tool Company ♠
- Inair Panama (leased)
- Japan Air Lines♠
- Japan Domestic Airlines
- Jetaway Travel Club
- LANICA
- Latin Carga (bought from Delta Air Lines)
- Monarch Airlines (leased)
- National Aeronautics and Space Administration (NASA)
- Northeast Airlines
- Onyx Aviation
- Pan West
- Profit Express
- Rainbow Air
- Rowan Drilling Company
- Trans World Airlines♠ (TWA)
- Torco Drilling Co.
- Sunfari Travel Club
- SunJet International
- Swissair♠
- VIASA♠
- WINGS

(♠ = original operators)

=== Military operators ===
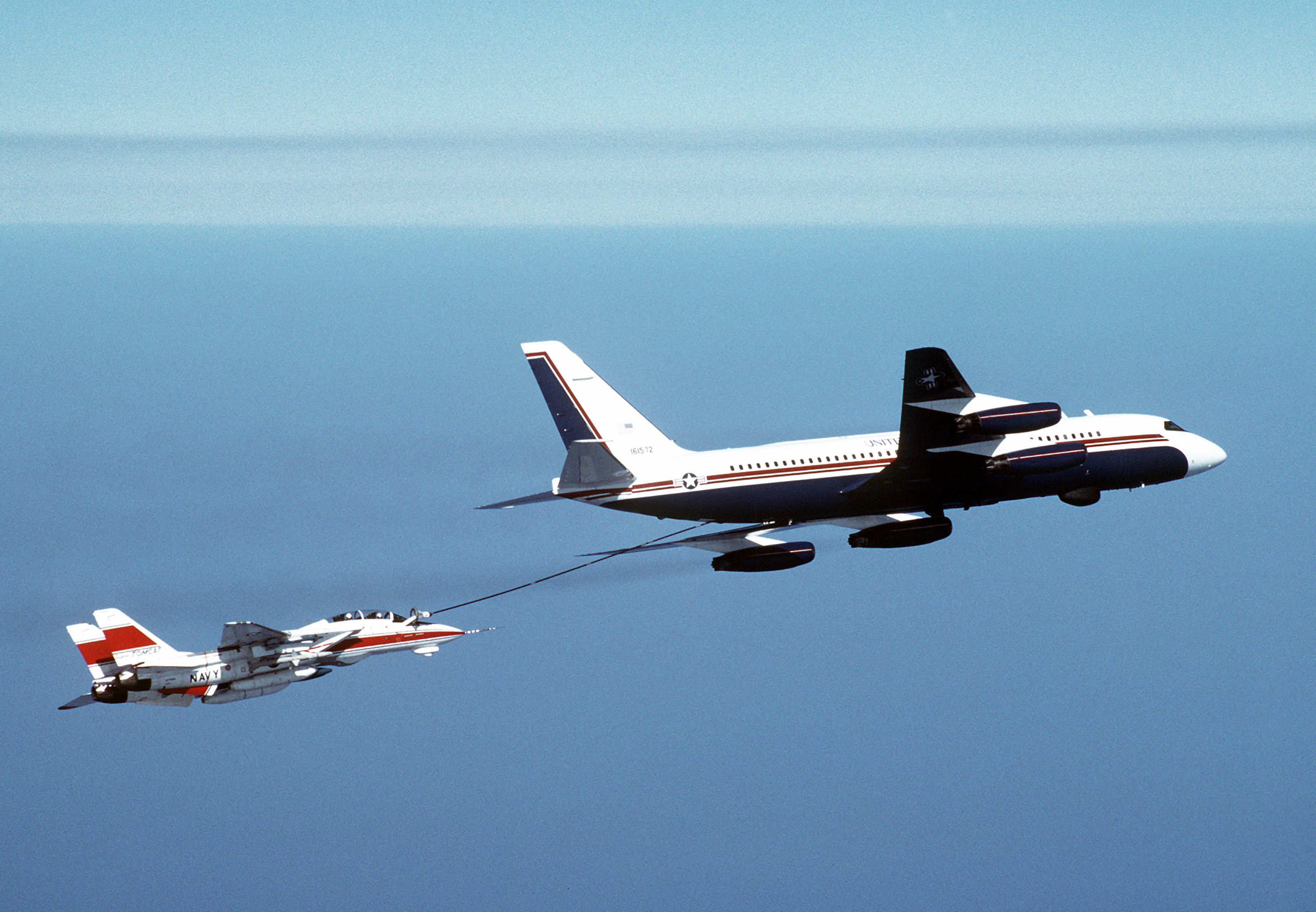
The Convair UC-880 refuelling an F-14 Tomcat in 1992

United States

- United States Navy – one Convair UC-880 testbed/Aerial refueling and remained in until 1995.

== Accidents and incidents ==
- On May 23, 1960, Delta Air Lines Flight 1903, a CV-880-22-1 (N8804E), crashed on takeoff at Atlanta Municipal Airport (now Atlanta Hartsfield-Jackson International Airport), resulting in the loss of all four crew members. This flight was to be a training sortie for two Delta captains who were being type-rated on the 880. At rotation, the aircraft pitched nose up, rolled left, and then back more steeply to the right, at which time it struck the ground, broke apart, and was consumed by a fire.
- On August 26, 1966, a Japan Air Lines CV-880-22M-3 (JA8030) crashed on takeoff from Haneda Airport during a training flight, killing all five crew members. When the nose lifted up, the aircraft yawed to the left, for reasons unknown. The number one engine struck the runway and the aircraft left the runway and the nose went back down. All four engines separated, as well as the nose and left main gear, and the aircraft caught fire. The aircraft was leased from Japan Domestic Airlines.
- On November 5, 1967, Cathay Pacific Flight 033, a CV-880-22M-3 (VR-HFX) overran the runway on takeoff from Kai Tak Airport following a loss of control after the right nosewheel blew, killing 1 of 127 on board.
- On November 20, 1967, TWA Flight 128 crashed on approach to Cincinnati/Northern Kentucky International Airport. Seventy people were killed and twelve people survived.
- On June 24, 1969, Japan Air Lines Flight 90, a CV-880-22M-3 (JA8028, Kikyo), crashed on takeoff from Grant County Airport, Washington, killing three of the five crew members. The flight was to simulate a takeoff with one engine out. Power was reduced to the number four engine during takeoff, but the aircraft continued to yaw to the right until the number four engine struck the runway. The aircraft slid off the runway and caught fire.
- On June 15, 1972, a bomb exploded on board Cathay Pacific Flight 700Z near Pleiku, South Vietnam, killing all 81 passengers and crew on board.
- On December 20, 1972, North Central Airlines Flight 575, a McDonnell Douglas DC-9-31, collided during its takeoff roll with Delta Air Lines Flight 954, a Convair 880 (N8807E), as the Convair 880 taxied across the runway at O'Hare International Airport in Chicago, Illinois. Only two people on the Convair 880 were injured, but 10 people died and 15 were injured on board the DC-9.
- On August 20, 1977, a Monarch Aviation CV-880-22-2 (N8817E) struck trees and crashed shortly after takeoff from Juan Santamaria International Airport, Costa Rica, due to overloading, killing the three crew.
- On November 3, 1980, a Latin Carga CV-880-22-2 (YV-145C) crashed on takeoff from Simon Bolivar International Airport, Caracas, Venezuela, during a crew training flight, killing the four crew.
- On May 11, 1983, a Groth Air CV-880-22-2 (N880SR) burned out at Juarez International Airport, Mexico City.
- In October 1986, an FAA CV-880-22M-3 (N5863) was intentionally destroyed in a test with anti-misting kerosene fuel additive at Mojave, California.

== Surviving aircraft ==
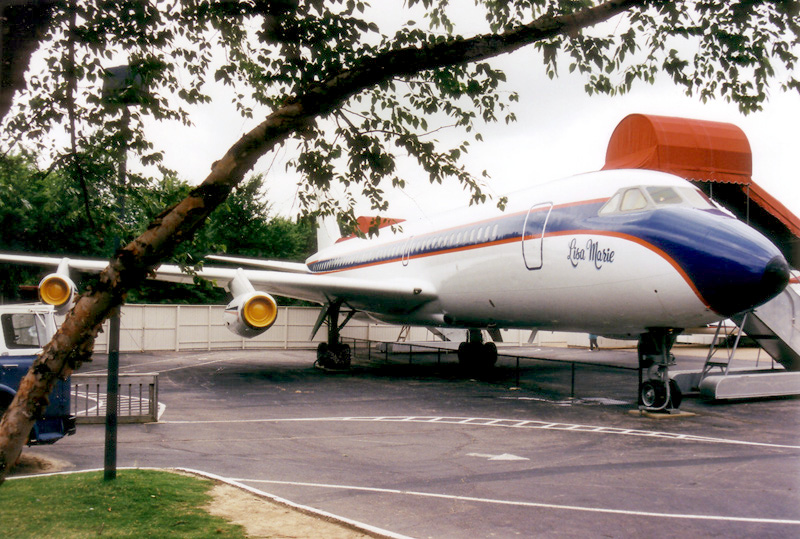
Elvis Presley's Convair 880, named Lisa Marie after his daughter

- 1 – Cockpit on display at the Delta Flight Museum in Atlanta, Georgia
- 1 – Training cockpit on display at the Prairie Aviation Museum in Bloomington, Illinois
- 3 – Forward fuselage on display at the Aviation Hall of Fame and Museum of New Jersey in Teterboro, New Jersey. It is on loan from Scroggins Aviation.
- 23 – Forward fuselage on display at the Tillamook Air Museum in Tillamook, Oregon. It is on loan from Scroggins Aviation.
- 35 – Complete aircraft in storage at Scroggins Aviation in Mojave, California (N815AJ).
- 38 – Lisa Marie – On display at Graceland in Memphis, Tennessee, formerly N8809E with Delta. Elvis Presley purchased the aircraft in 1975 and named it after his daughter. In January 2015, it was put up for sale and eventually bought back by Elvis Presley Enterprises and displayed as part of the Presley Museum collection.
- 58 – Converted into a lodge in East London, South Africa: This airframe was converted into a business jet in the 1970s (registration N88CH). It was purchased by the Ciskei government in 1987 intended for use by president Lennox Sebe, but remained at Bhisho Airport for several years due to a lack of funds to make it airworthy. In 1992, it was bought by Billy Nel (now Eastern Cape Provincial Finance MEC), who had it transported to his private residence north of East London, South Africa. The 1970s, VIP interior with couches, beds and a bar remain intact, and it is used for private functions. The aircraft is on display at the Morganville Farm Private Motorcycle Museum. One of the engines was donated to the Stutterheim Engine Museum.

== Specifications ==
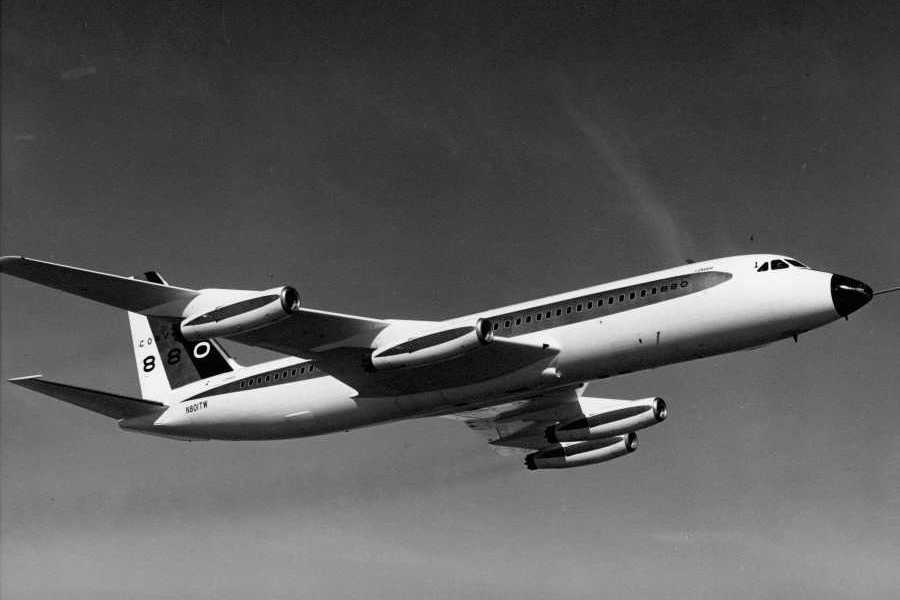
The 880 was powered by four underwing General Electric CJ-805 turbojets.

Jane's All The World's Aircraft 1965–66
Variant	22	22M
Crew	3	
Capacity	110 passengers / 24,000 lb (11,000 kg)	
Length	129 ft 4 in (39.42 m)	
Height	36 ft 3.75 in (11.07 m)	
Wing	120 ft 0 in (36.58 m) span, 2,000 sq ft (190 m^{2}) area (7.2 AR)	
Airfoil	root: NACA 0011-64 (modified); tip: NACA 0008-64 (modified)	
Empty weight	87,400 lb (39,600 kg)	94,000 lb (43,000 kg)
Fuel capacity	10,584 US gal (40,060 L; 8,813 imp gal)	12,538 US gal (47,460 L; 10,440 imp gal) (Note: with optional centre-section tanks)
MTOW	184,500 lb (83,700 kg)	193,000 lb (88,000 kg)
4 × turbojets	General Electric CJ-805-3	General Electric CJ-805-3B
Unit thrust	11,650 lbf (51.8 kN)	
Cruise	470–534.5 kn (870–990 km/h; 541–615 mph) (Note: max. cruise at 22,500 ft (6,900 m) (at MTOW), econ. cruise M0.82 at 35,000 ft (11,000 m) and 140,000 lb (64,000 kg) weight)	
Ceiling	41,000 ft (12,000 m)	
Range	2,472 nmi (2,845 mi; 4,578 km) (Note: 22,500 lb (10,200 kg) payload and 14,000 lb (6,400 kg) reserve fuel)	2,503 nmi (2,880 mi; 4,636 km) (Note: 24,000 lb (11,000 kg) payload and 16,000 lb (7,300 kg) reserve fuel)
Wing loading	92.25 lb/sq ft (450.4 kg/m^{2})	96.5 lb/sq ft (471 kg/m^{2})
Take-off	8,750 ft (2,670 m)	7,550 ft (2,300 m)
Landing (Note: at 135,000 lb (61,000 kg))	6,250 ft (1,900 m)	5,350 ft (1,630 m)

== See also ==
Related development

- Convair 990 Coronado

Aircraft of comparable role, configuration, and era

- Boeing 720
- Shanghai Y-10

Related lists

- List of jet airliners
