= 2024 Haneda Airport runway collision =

Aircraft accident in Japan

2024 Haneda Airport runway collision Japan Airlines Flight 516 Japan Coast Guard DHC-8
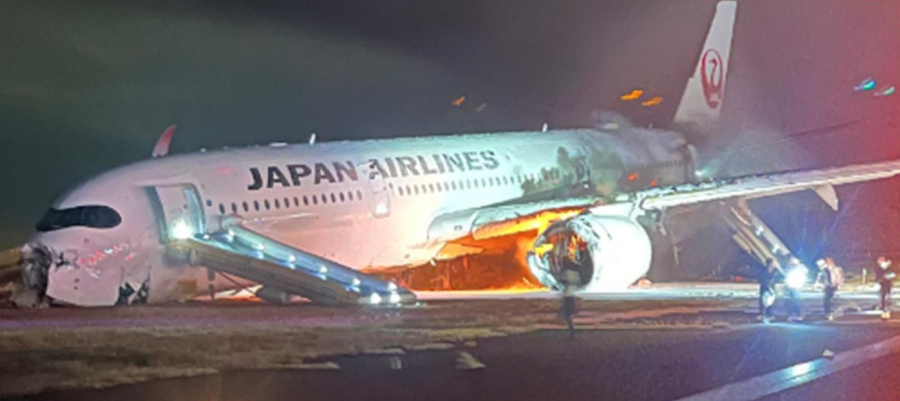
- The Airbus A350 during the evacuation

Accident
- Date: 2 January 2024
- Summary: Runway collision
- Site: Runway 34R, Haneda Airport, Tokyo, Japan; 35°32′50″N 139°47′59″E
- Total fatalities: 5
- Total injuries: 18
- Total survivors: 380

First aircraft
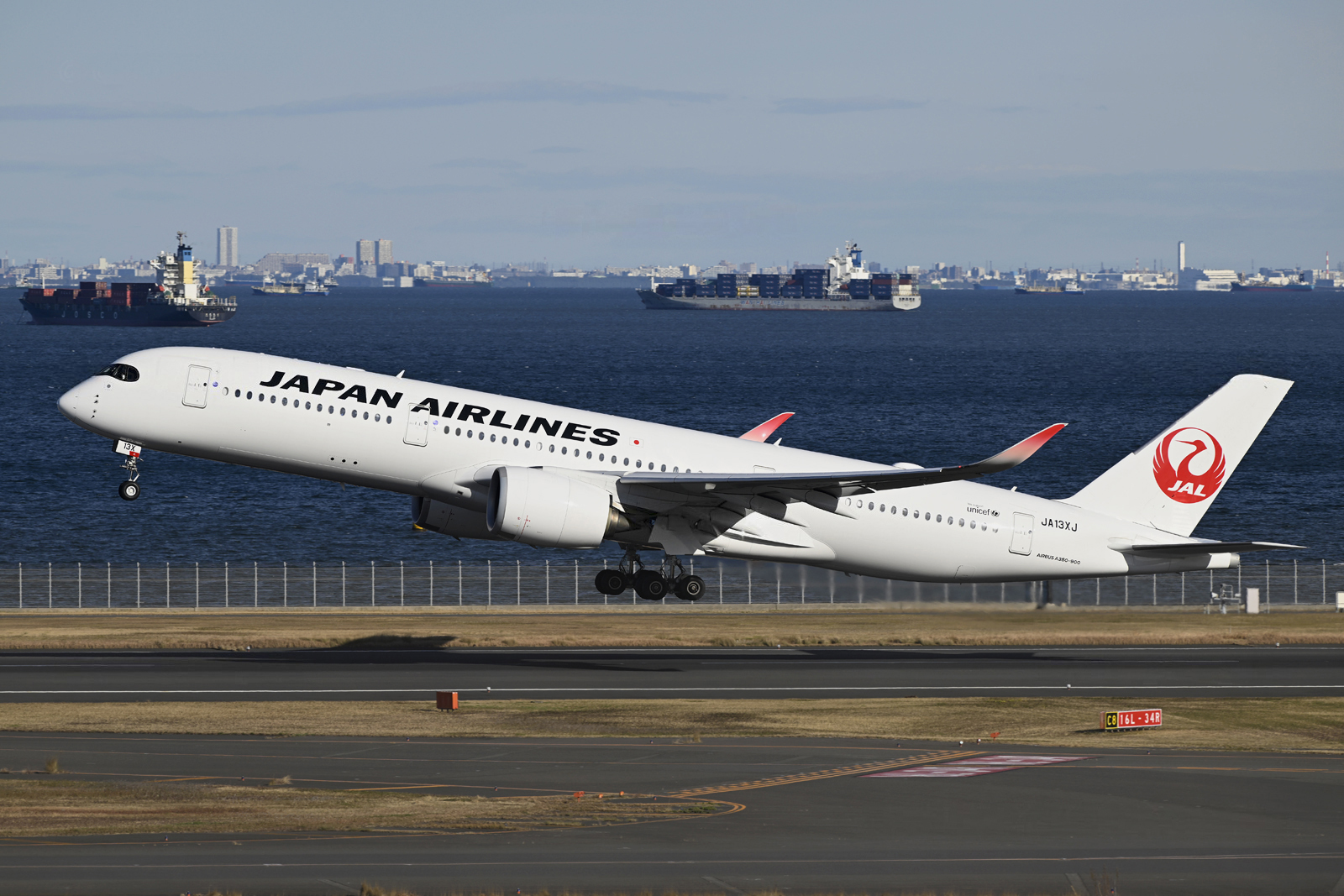
- JA13XJ, the Airbus A350-941 involved in the collision, seen in 2023
- Type: Airbus A350-941 (Note: The 9 in the suffix denotes that this aircraft was a -900 series variant of the A350; 41 is the Airbus type code designating it was equipped with Rolls-Royce Trent XWB engines.)
- Operator: Japan Airlines
- IATA flight No.: JL516
- ICAO flight No.: JAL516
- Call sign: JAPAN AIR 516
- Registration: JA13XJ
- Flight origin: New Chitose Airport, Chitose, Hokkaido, Japan
- Destination: Haneda Airport, Tokyo, Japan
- Occupants: 379
- Passengers: 367
- Crew: 12
- Fatalities: 0
- Injuries: 17
- Survivors: 379

Second aircraft
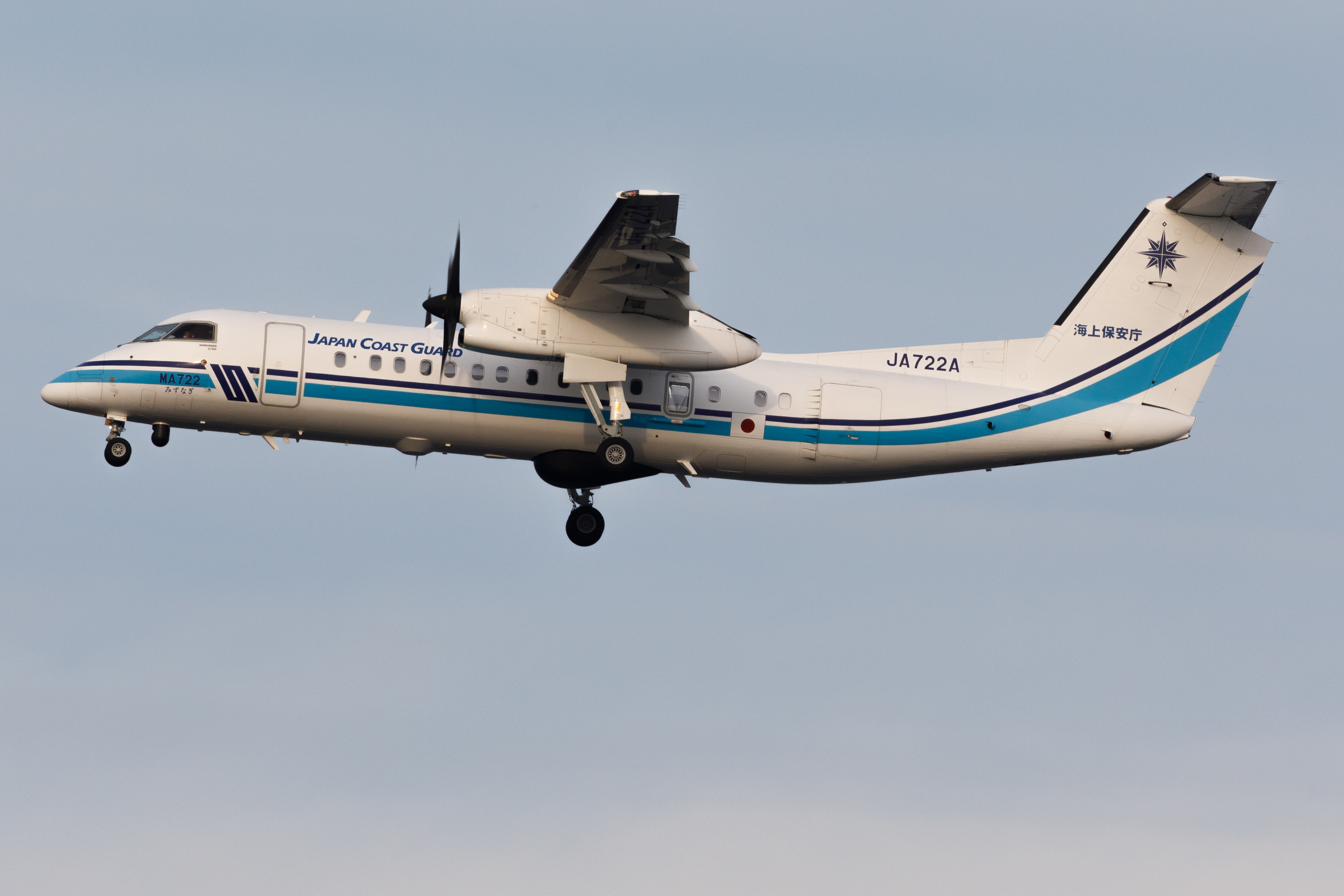
- JA722A, the De Havilland Canada DHC-8-315Q MPA involved in the collision, seen in 2022
- Type: De Havilland Canada DHC-8-315Q MPA (Note: The 3 in the suffix denotes that this aircraft was a -300 series variant of the Dash 8, 15 designates that the aircraft was equipped with Pratt & Whitney Canada PW123E engines, Q denotes that it was fitted with the active noise and vibration suppression system, and MPA designates that it was equipped as a maritime patrol aircraft.)
- Name: Mizunagi-1
- Operator: Japan Coast Guard
- Call sign: JULIET ALPHA 722 ALPHA
- Registration: JA722A
- Flight origin: Haneda Airport, Tokyo, Japan
- Destination: Niigata Airport, Niigata, Japan
- Occupants: 6
- Crew: 6
- Fatalities: 5
- Injuries: 1
- Survivors: 1

On 2 January 2024, a runway collision occurred at Haneda Airport in Tokyo, Japan, involving an Airbus A350, operating as Japan Airlines Flight 516, and a De Havilland Canada Dash 8 operated by the Japan Coast Guard (JA722A). Flight 516 was a scheduled domestic passenger flight from New Chitose Airport near Sapporo, Japan, to Haneda Airport. The Coast Guard plane was scheduled to deliver relief supplies a day after the 2024 Noto earthquake.

As Japan Airlines Flight 516 was landing, it collided with the Coast Guard aircraft, immediately igniting fires that destroyed both aircraft. Five of the six crew on board the Dash 8 died in the collision, leaving only the captain alive. Everyone on board the A350 survived. Investigations have determined that Japan Airlines Flight 516 was given landing clearance, while the Coast Guard aircraft did not have permission to be on the runway.

The accident marked the first hull-loss accident involving Japan Airlines since Flight 123 in 1985, and also the first hull-loss accident of an Airbus A350 since its introduction in January 2015.

== Aircraft ==
The JAL aircraft involved in the accident was an Airbus A350-941, operating as Flight 516, manufacturer serial number 538, and registered as JA13XJ. The aircraft was just over two years old at the time of the collision, first flying on 20 September 2021 and delivered to JAL on 10 November.

The Japan Coast Guard aircraft involved was a De Havilland Canada DHC-8-315Q MPA, manufacturer serial number 656, nicknamed Mizunagi-1 (Japanese: みずなぎ1号), and registered as JA722A. The aircraft was approximately 16 years old, first flying in November 2007, and acquired by the Coast Guard in March 2009. The aircraft had been damaged in the 2011 Tōhoku earthquake and tsunami while parked at Sendai Airport, and was the only aircraft damaged there to be repaired afterwards. The Dash 8 was fitted with a Mode S-capable transponder but was reportedly not equipped with ADS-B; this meant the aircraft's position and speed were not reported by the aircraft itself and instead relied on multilateration by on-ground receivers.

== Accident ==
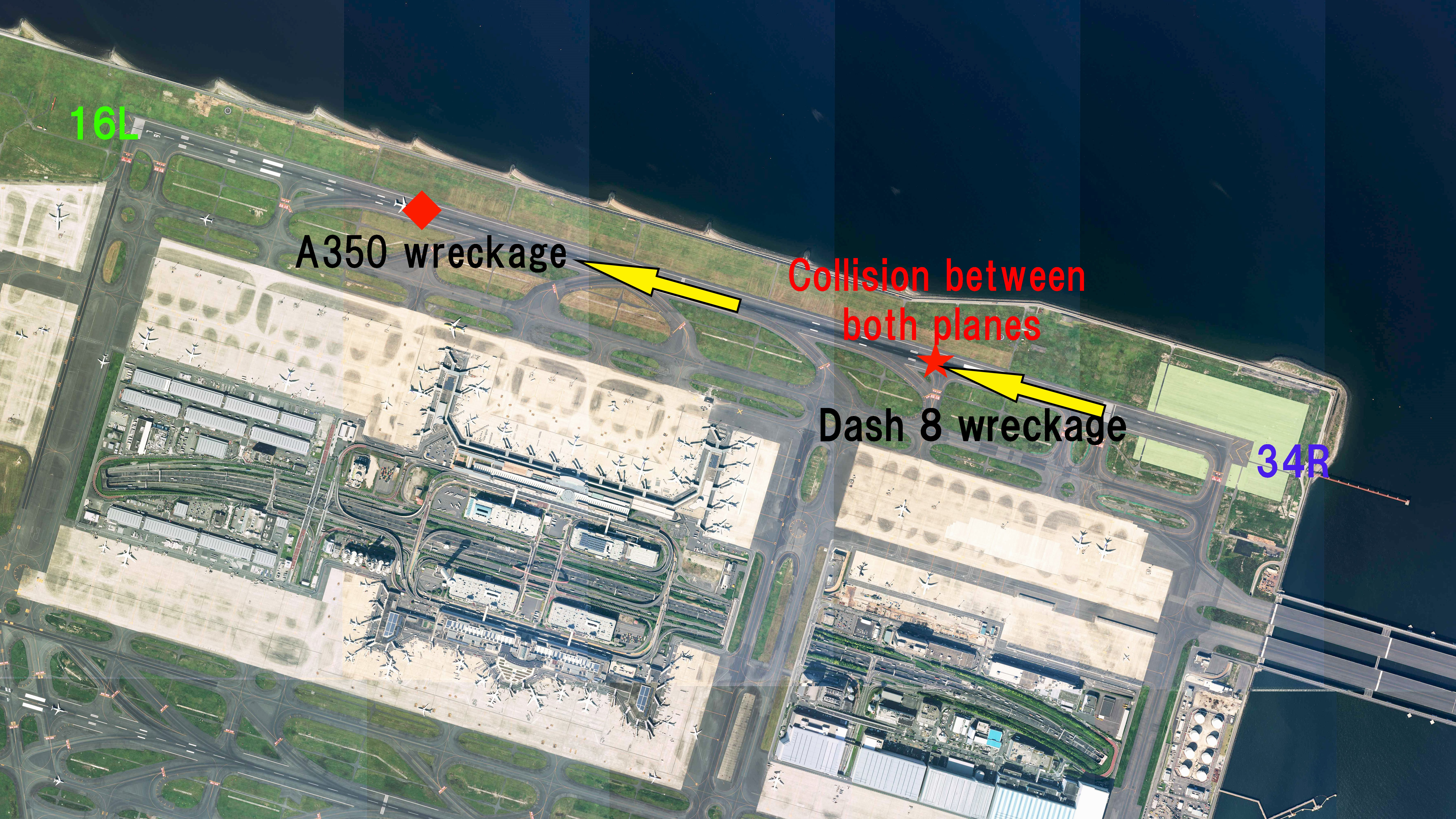
Airport layout with the location of the runway collision and the wreckage of both aircraft

=== Coast Guard aircraft ===
The Japan Coast Guard aircraft, carrying six crew members, was transporting emergency supplies to an airbase in Niigata in response to the 2024 Noto earthquake, which had occurred the day before. It was one of four aircraft deployed by the government to provide help to the affected areas.

The aircraft was reported to be stationary on the runway for around 40 seconds before the collision. Genki Miyamoto (宮本 元気, Miyamoto Genki), the captain, reported that the back of the aircraft suddenly caught fire shortly after he had increased the engine power before exploding following the collision. He survived with serious injuries, while the five remaining crew members were confirmed dead by the Tokyo Fire Department. The wreckage of the Coast Guard aircraft was left several hundred meters from the final stopping point of the JAL plane.

=== JAL 516 ===
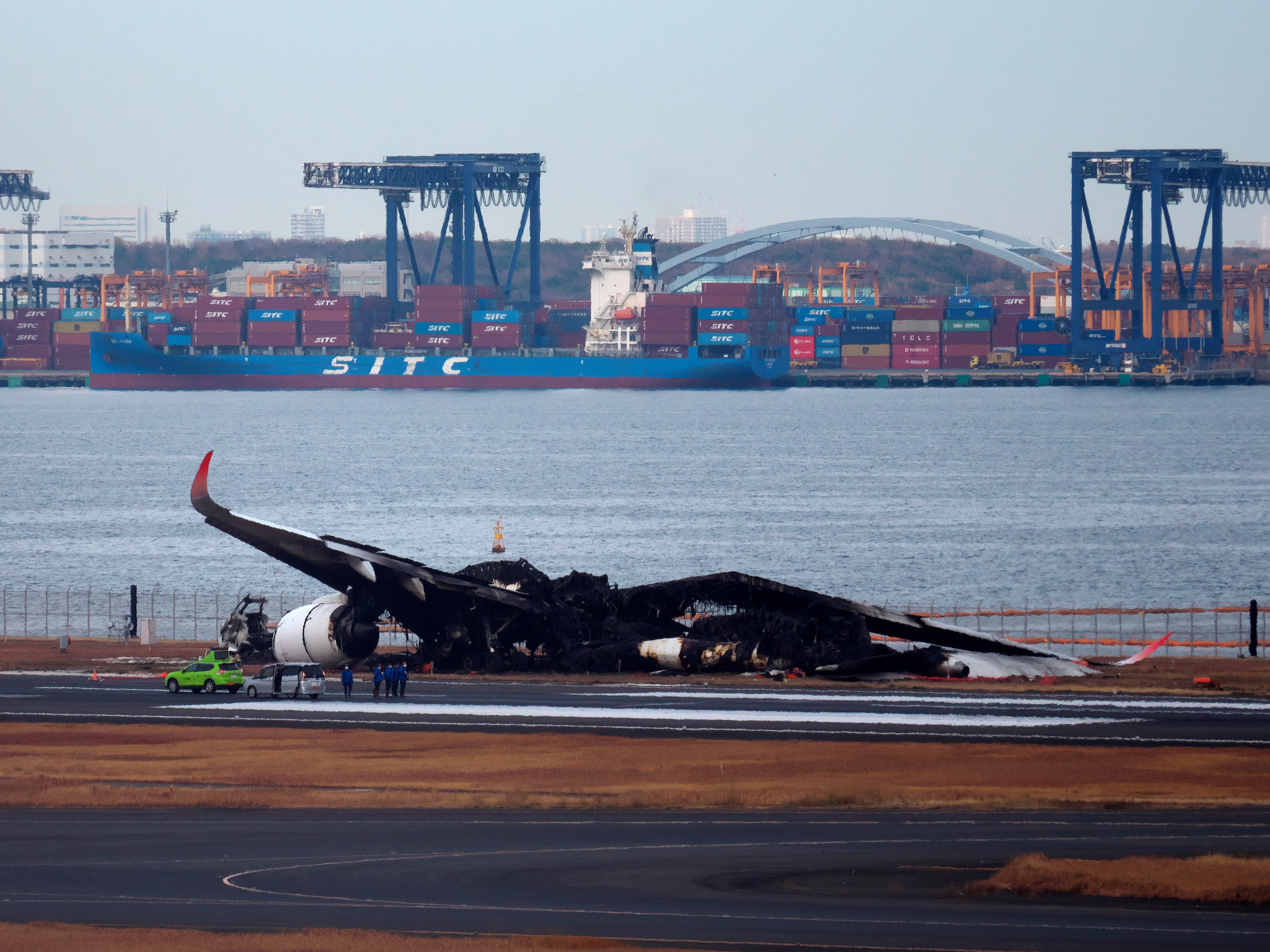
The wreckage of the Airbus A350 after the collision

Japan Airlines Flight 516 (ICAO flight number JAL516) departed New Chitose Airport at 16:27 JST (07:27 UTC) en route to Haneda Airport. The flight landed 52 minutes after sunset, in darkness, with light and variable winds, visibility greater than 10 km (6.2 mi), few clouds at 2,000 feet (610 m), and a scattered cloud layer at 9,000 feet (2,700 m).

At approximately 17:47 JST (08:47 UTC), JAL516 collided with a Japan Coast Guard Dash 8, identified by its call sign and registration number JA722A, while landing on runway 34R at Haneda Airport. CCTV footage shows a fireball erupting from the aircraft, and the JAL plane leaving a fiery trail as it traveled down the runway for about 1 km (0.62 mi) before coming to a stop on the grass apron beside the runway. Smoke filled the A350's cabin quickly after the accident. Firefighters arrived at the scene in about three minutes, with about 70 fire trucks responding. According to the Tokyo Fire Department, the fire was largely extinguished shortly after midnight, by which time the plane's structure had collapsed due to the intensity of the flames. The collision and subsequent fire were captured by CCTV cameras in Terminal 2. After the collision, the ADS-B signals, except for position information, from the aircraft were received for about one minute. Firefighters later said that the fire spread from the vicinity of the plane's left engine.

According to a statement by a JAL spokesman, the three pilots felt a sudden shock immediately after landing and lost control of the aircraft while trying to maintain its course along the runway. They were unaware that a fire had broken out on board until they were informed by a cabin attendant that the left engine was on fire, and one of the pilots later said that he had seen an object that had caused him concern before the collision. However, the three pilots denied that they had visually confirmed the presence of the Coast Guard aircraft.

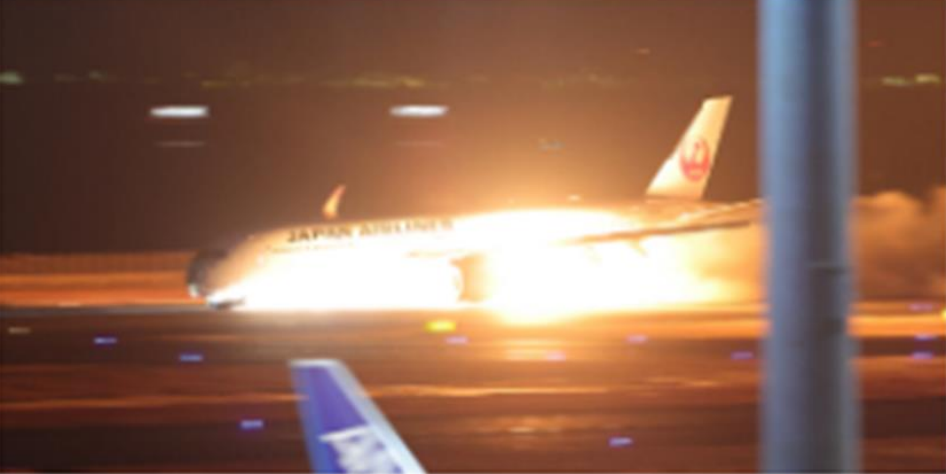
Flight 516 moments after colliding with JA722A

With the right engine still running, all 367 passengers and 12 crew members on board JAL516 evacuated through three of the plane's eight evacuation slides, located at doors 1L, 1R and 4L. JAL said the plane's in-flight announcement system had failed, leading the crew to give instructions through megaphones or by shouting. Forty-three foreign nationals and eight children were on board. Two pets, a dog and a cat, were checked in on board and died. Seventeen people on board suffered injuries. It was noted that no one exited with hand luggage, a factor that facilitated a smoother evacuation. JAL's original announcement stated that the evacuation of all crew and passengers was completed at 18:05 JST (09:05 UTC), 18 minutes after the plane collided, but a subsequent investigation by the Japan Transport Safety Board revealed that it was completed at 17:58 (08:58 UTC), 11 minutes after the plane collision. Paul Hayes, the director of air safety at Ascend, a British-based aviation consultancy, told Reuters, "The cabin crew must have done an excellent job. It was a miracle that all the passengers got off considering the wreckage shown in many images".

Another factor cited in the survival of those on board was that the aircraft, one of the first commercial models to be made of composite carbon fiber materials, appeared to have withstood the initial impact of the collision and fire relatively well.

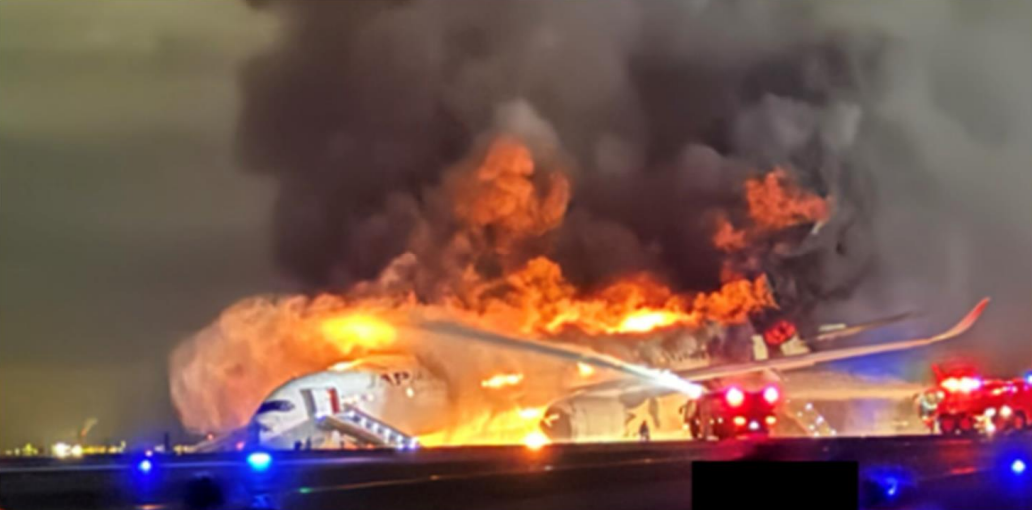
Flight 516 during the evacuation process (2 January 2024)

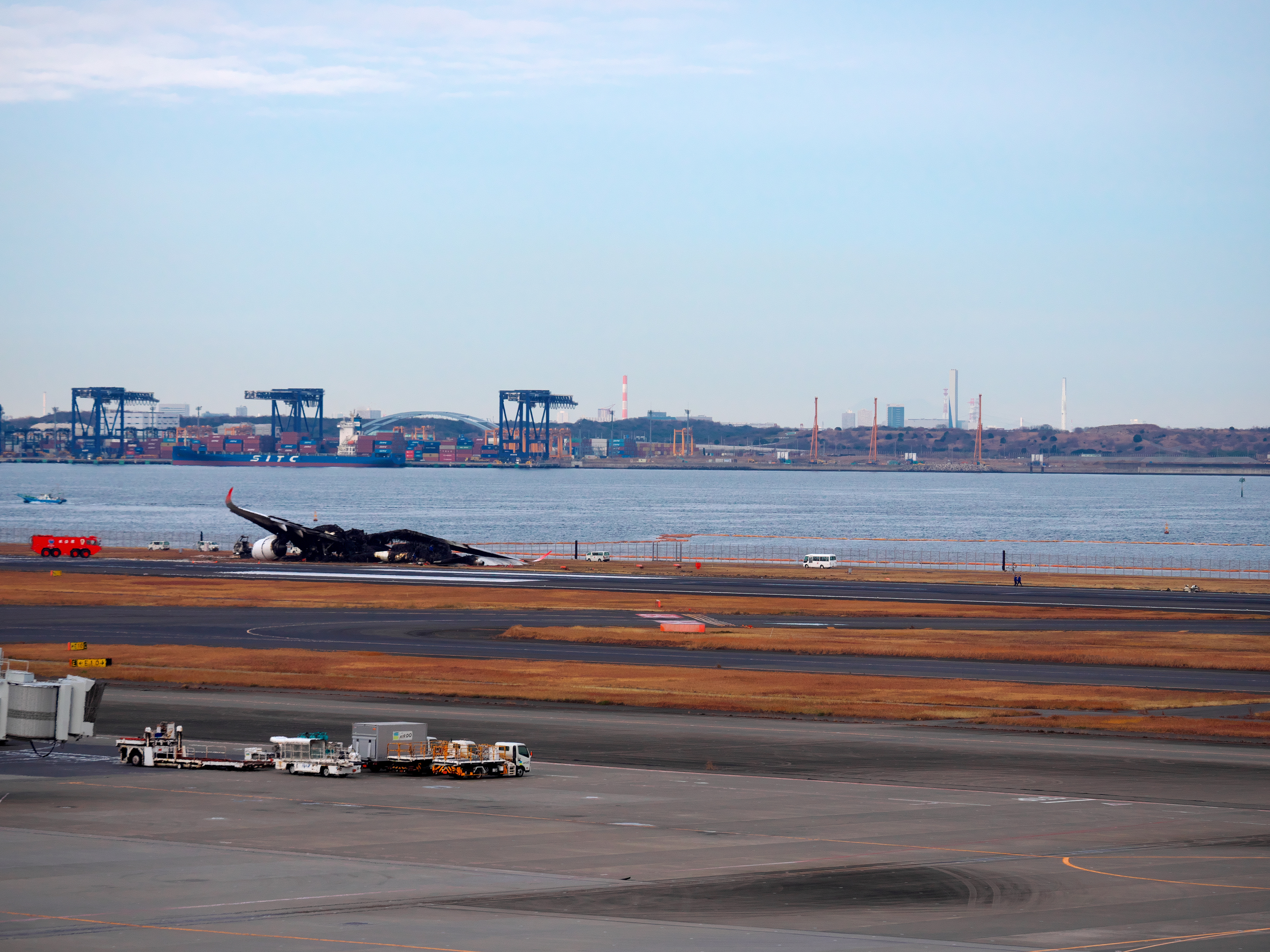
View of the area around the wreckage of JAL Flight 516. Some fallen debris can be seen in the right-most portion of the photo. (3 January 2024)

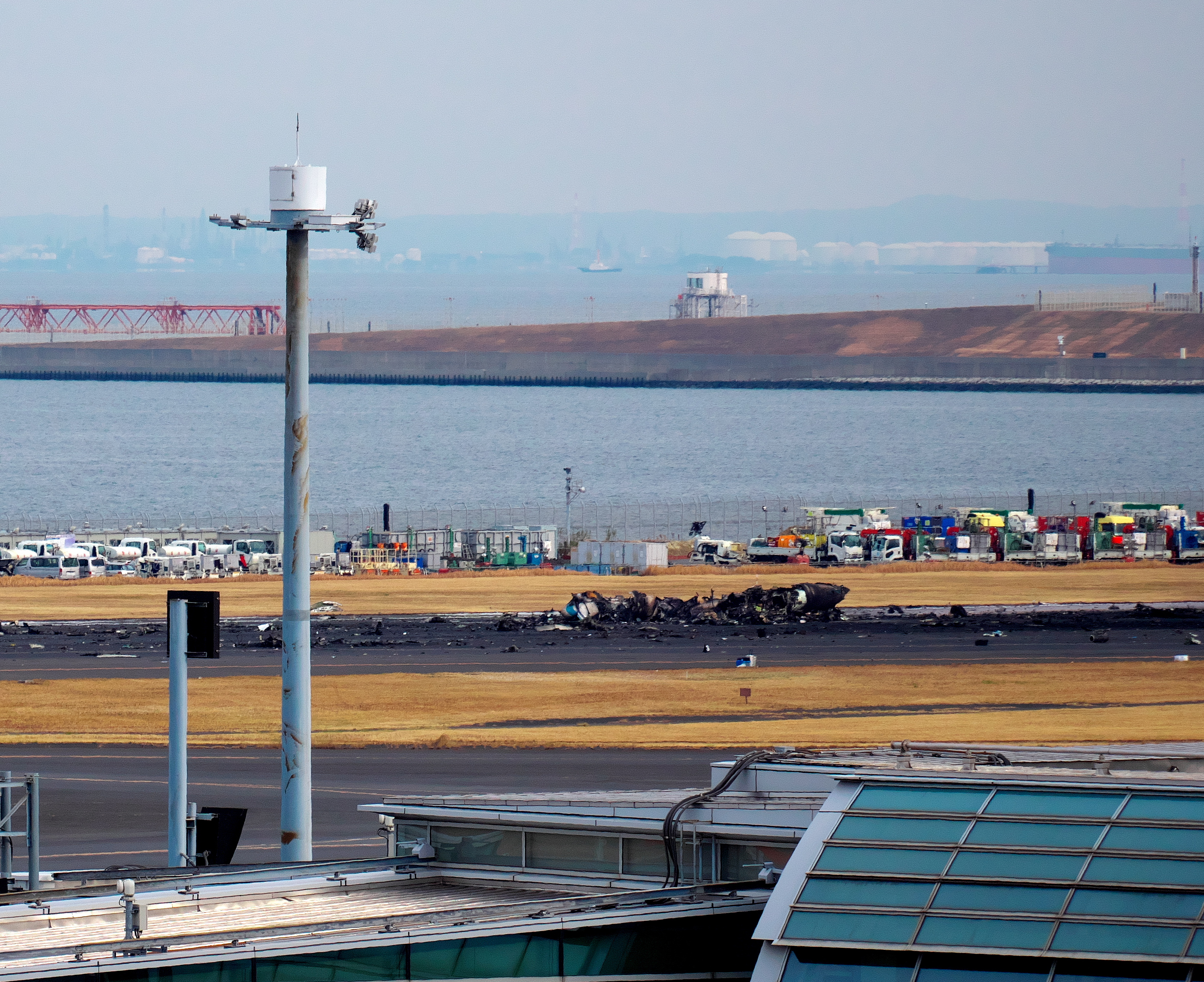
The wreckage of the Coast Guard plane (3 January 2024)

== Aftermath ==
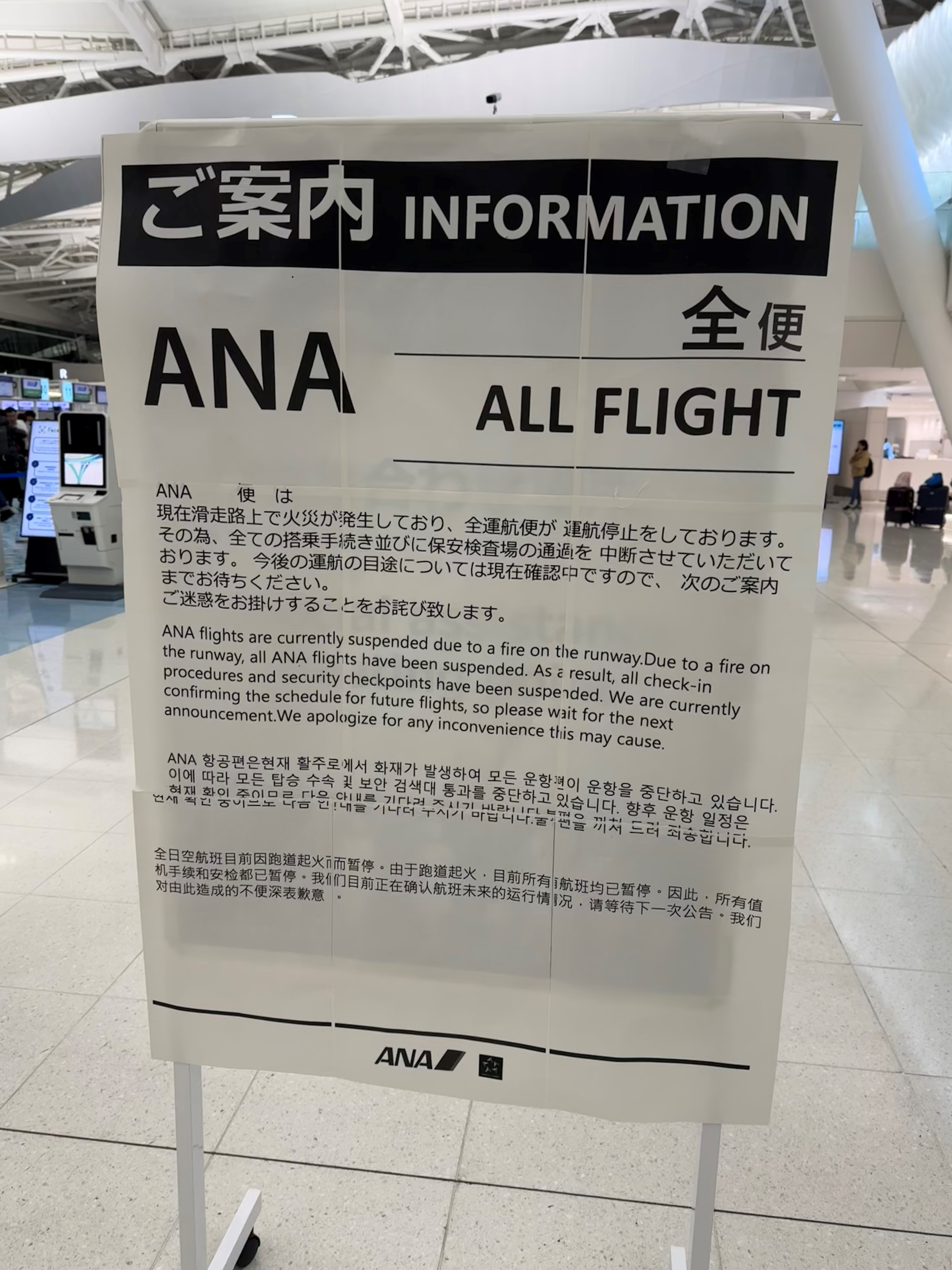
A sign inside Terminal 2 of Haneda Airport indicating the suspension of ANA flights

=== Operations at Haneda Airport ===
Although all occupants on the Airbus A350 were evacuated with few minor injuries, the plane was destroyed in the post-crash fire and was written off, with Japan Airlines estimating the operational losses from its hull loss at 15 billion yen ($105 million), which is set to be covered by insurance. The aircraft following immediately behind Flight 516—JAL166, a Boeing 737-800 approaching runway 34R—had to perform a go-around at 1,150 feet (350 m) before diverting to Narita International Airport. There were also several flights waiting for takeoff; most returned to the terminal after the runways were closed.

The accident occurred as millions were traveling for the New Year holidays, one of the busiest travel periods of the year. All runways at Haneda Airport were temporarily closed following the accident, and many flights were diverted to nearby Narita Airport, as well as Chubu Centrair International Airport and Kansai International Airport. Others were cancelled as the result of the accident, with All Nippon Airways registering 112 domestic flight cancellations for the rest of the day and JAL cancelling 116 domestic flights. At around 21:30 JST (12:30 UTC), Haneda Airport's remaining three runways were reopened according to the Ministry of Land, Infrastructure, Transport and Tourism (MLIT). Cancellations continued through 7 January, by which time at least 1,227 flights and 221,910 passengers had been affected. The accident reduced Haneda Airport's flight capacity to 70%. In response to these delays, JR group set up supplemental Shinkansen services on the Tokaido, Hokuriku, and Tohoku Shinkansen routes on 4 January out to Osaka, Kanazawa, and Hokkaido respectively. These extra services were offered without seat reservations.

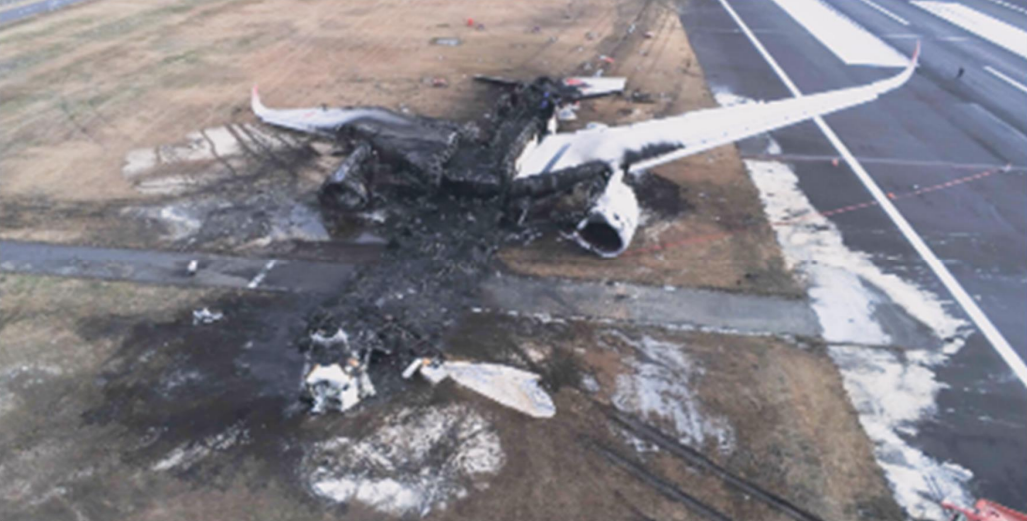
The remains of JA13XJ

Workers began clearing the wreckage of the Coast Guard aircraft on the afternoon of 4 January, followed by that of JAL 516 on the morning of 5 January. The clearance operations, which included restoring damaged sections of pavement on the runway, were completed on 7 January. The affected runway reopened to traffic on 8 January. Operations at the airport were expected to fully normalize on 10 January. Lighting damaged by the accident was also expected to be repaired by February 2024. The MLIT also warned of additional aircraft flying over Chiba Prefecture at low altitudes after the collision rendered low-altitude routes over central Tokyo unusable.

On 12 January, the Japan Coast Guard suspended personnel at the Haneda Air Station, which has jurisdiction over the coastal waters between Ibaraki and Shizuoka Prefectures, from operating the facility's two helicopters and three remaining fixed-wing aircraft as part of efforts to ensure safety and psychological care to the staff, delegating the operation of the station's air assets to personnel from other Coast Guard facilities. Base personnel received retraining at Chitose Air Station in Hokkaido, while helicopter flights resumed on 1 March. Full operations at the base fully resumed on 28 March.

=== Government response ===
The Japanese government set up an information liaison office at the Crisis Management Center in the Prime Minister's Office. The Japan Transport Safety Board announced that a formal investigation would begin on 3 January.

Following reports that the air traffic controllers were unaware that the Coast Guard aircraft had entered the runway without clearance, the MLIT installed a new air traffic controller post on 6 January that would provide constant monitoring of aircraft at the airport. The use of the phrase "number 1" in air traffic control parlance was also prohibited after the investigation suggested that the usage of the term led the Coast Guard pilot to think he had clearance to enter the runway. Brighter colors for stop lines before runway entrances were also to be introduced in Haneda and other airports.

=== Commemorations ===
The remains of the fatalities aboard the Coast Guard aircraft were subjected to an autopsy before being returned to their families on 8 January. A tribute was held by their colleagues at the Japan Coast Guard base in Haneda.

JAL announced that it was considering preserving the wreckage of Flight 516 to remind employees of the importance of prioritizing safety, similar to what it had done with the wreckage of Japan Air Lines Flight 123 which crashed in 1985.

== Reactions ==
Japanese Prime Minister Fumio Kishida extended his condolences to the dead, referring to their service to the victims of the 2024 Noto earthquake. Tokyo Governor Yuriko Koike also expressed sadness over "the fact that 'one disaster led to another disaster'".

IATA posted on Twitter extending its condolences to the passengers and crew on board the two aircraft. They also expressed condolences regarding the previous day's earthquake.

Airbus released a statement confirming it was in communication with JAL and would "communicate further details when available". It also said that it was sending specialists to help in the investigation.

JAL released a statement confirming the events of the runway collision and sent condolences to the families and friends of the five people killed. It also apologized for the inconvenience and distress caused to passengers, friends, families, and everyone affected by the accident, and gave assurances that it would cooperate with the investigation. JAL also offered full refunds and free rebooking up until 31 January for passengers who had already booked flights scheduled between 2 January and 1 April.

The Japan Federation of Civil Aviation Workers' Union for Air Safety (JFAS) said that, in line with ICAO Annex 13, finding out the facts should be the first priority, adding that in many cases police intervention prevented the identification of the cause of aircraft accidents.

On 17 January, both JAL president Yuji Akasaka and the head of the Japan Coast Guard Shohei Ishii apologized for their aircraft's involvement in the collision.

== Investigation ==
The Japan Transport Safety Board is the lead agency for the investigation. The French Bureau of Enquiry and Analysis for Civil Aviation Safety (BEA) announced on Twitter that they will be cooperating with Airbus during the investigation. It also added that it would send a team to Japan to investigate the accident, as part of their protocol for accidents involving an Airbus aircraft. UK investigators from the A350 engine manufacturer Rolls-Royce also planned to join them. The Transportation Safety Board of Canada, along with technical advisers from the Dash 8's manufacturer De Havilland Canada and engine manufacturer Pratt & Whitney Canada, announced they would also be taking part in the investigation. The United States' National Transportation Safety Board (NTSB) will also provide assistance in the investigation.

On 3 January, the MLIT released the transcript of air traffic control communication, covering the last 4 minutes and 27 seconds before the crash. It showed that prior to the accident, air traffic controllers cleared the JAL aircraft to land on runway 34R, while the Coast Guard aircraft was instructed to hold short of the runway at a holding point on taxiway C5. NHK, however, citing a source within the Coast Guard, reported that the pilot of the Coast Guard plane claimed to have received clearance to take off. Air traffic controllers later told MLIT officials that they had not noticed the Coast Guard plane moving onto the runway, adding that they were preoccupied with assisting other aircraft. An MLIT official said that the pilot of the Coast Guard aircraft may not have heard the air traffic control tower authorizing the JAL aircraft to land as his radio could have been set to ground control. Another MLIT official also said that the Coast Guard was not informed of measures introduced by a government task force to prevent airport runway incursions following similar accidents in 2007. Japanese police were reportedly investigating possible professional negligence, including fatigue and staffing levels, that may have caused the accident.

By 6 January, the flight data and cockpit voice recorders of both aircraft had been recovered, with the Japan Transport Safety Board saying on 23 January that they had not sustained major damage.

On 24 June, the MLIT released the first interim report. The investigation pointed out issues such as the lack of personnel gathered at the airport and the delay with the guidance of emergency vehicles. Moreover, it was revealed that over 100 emergency vehicles were waiting to enter the airport and several ambulances carrying injured passengers were unable to leave for about 30 minutes. For future measures, the ministry is scheduled to revise its emergency guidance by August and also requested the number of airport staff that are available to respond to such emergencies on holidays and at night be increased.

A progress report was released by the Japan Transport Safety Board on 25 December 2024. The report indicated that the captain of the Coast Guard aircraft mistook air traffic control's instruction when their aircraft was told that they were "number one," and entered runway 34R believing that takeoff clearance was given. The report added that neither the controller in charge nor the JAL pilots noticed that the Coast Guard aircraft had entered the runway, and that the three circumstances combined resulted in the accident. It also provided details on the evacuation of the JAL plane, and the actions of its pilots and cabin crew.

== See also ==
- 1991 Los Angeles runway collision, a similar accident
- List of accidents and incidents involving commercial aircraft
- 2024 in aviation
- List of Japan Airlines incidents and accidents
