= Scroggins Aviation =

American aviation special effects company

- Industry: Film
- Founded: 2000; 25 years ago in Las Vegas, United States
- Founder: James Douglas Scroggins
- Headquarters: Las Vegas, United States
- Website: scrogginsaviation.com

Scroggins Aviation is an American aircraft salvage and aviation movie special effects company based in Las Vegas, Nevada. It has provided special effects for several network television shows and feature films.

== History ==
The company initially operated in the commercial aircraft dismantling, crash recovery, and recycling industry. Scroggins Aviation was founded in 2000 by James Douglas (Doug) Scroggins III, a veteran of the film industry and aviation industry. The company changed its name in 2015 to Scroggins Aviation Mockup & Effects.

== Film and television ==
A selection of films that used Scroggins to produce aviation materials for its sets include:

- 65 (film)
- Hobbs and Shaw
- Bumblebee (film)
- Deadpool 2
- Jurassic World
- Captain America: Civil War
- Terminator Genisys
- Spider-Man: Homecoming
- Dunkirk
- Iron Man 3
- Sully
- Independence Day: Resurgence
- Jumanji: Welcome to the Jungle
- Fifty Shades Darker
- Flight

Television series for which Scroggins has designed sets have included:

- The Event
- Pan Am
- Agents of S.H.I.E.L.D.
- The Night Shift
- The Last Ship
